= The Citadel Bulldogs baseball, 2010–2019 =

College baseball team

The Citadel Bulldogs baseball represents The Citadel, The Military College of South Carolina in college baseball at the NCAA Division I level. The program was established in 1899, and has continuously fielded a team since 1947. Their primary rivals are College of Charleston, Furman and VMI.

== 2010 ==
2010 The Citadel Bulldogs baseball
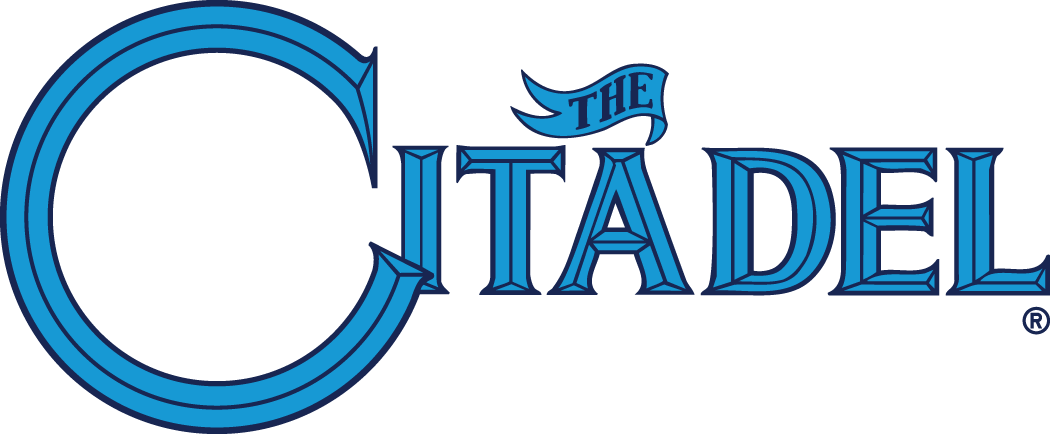

SoCon baseball tournament Champions Southern Conference Regular season Champions
- Conference: Southern Conference
- Record: 43–22 (24–6 SoCon)
- Head coach: Fred Jordan (19th season)
- Assistant coaches: David Beckley (9th season); Randy Carlson; Zach Brown
- Home stadium: Joseph P. Riley Jr. Park

2010 Southern Conference baseball standings
	Conf.				Overall
Team	W		L	PCT	W		L	PCT
The Citadel ‍†‍‡‍^{y}	24	–	6	.800	43	–	22	.662
#29 College of Charleston ^{y} ‍‍‍	22	–	8	.733	44	–	19	.698
Georgia Southern ‍‍‍	19	–	11	.633	34	–	24	.586
Elon ‍‍‍^{y}	19	–	11	.633	38	–	24	.613
Samford ‍‍‍	17	–	12	.586	31	–	25	.554
Western Carolina ‍‍‍	16	–	13	.552	37	–	21	.638
Appalachian State ‍‍‍	14	–	14	.500	38	–	18	.679
Furman ‍‍‍	11	–	19	.367	19	–	37	.339
Wofford ‍‍‍	9	–	21	.300	17	–	38	.309
UNC Greensboro ‍‍‍	7	–	23	.233	20	–	33	.377
Davidson ‍‍‍	5	–	25	.167	19	–	32	.373
† – Conference champion ‡ – SoCon Tournament champion y – Invited to the NCAA tournament As of June 30, 2010; Rankings from Collegiate Baseball

=== Roster ===
2010 The Citadel Bulldogs roster
**Pitchers**: 1 Mike Clevinger – Freshman; 5 Austin Pritcher – Freshman; 9 Asher Wojciechowski – Junior; 10 Chris Boyce – Senior; 13 Matt Reifsnider – Senior; 15 Jeffrey Spillane – Freshman; 16 Matt Talley – Junior; 17 Nick Sprowls – Senior; 19 Jeremy Long – Sophomore; 25 Raymond Copenhaver – Senior; 28 Drew Mahaffey – Junior; 30 Michael Cardwell – Junior; 33 Grant Williamson – Freshman	**Catchers**: 6 Ben Carr – Freshman; 22 Kirk Sims – Junior; 36 Grant Richards – (redshirt) Sophomore; **Infielders**: 2 Justin Mackert – Sophomore; 4 John Pless – Freshman; 11 Matt Simonelli – (redshirt) Junior; 12 Kyle Jordan – Senior; 14 David Greene – Sophomore; 20 Legare Jones – Junior; 21 Ryne Hardwick – Freshman; 23 Bryan Altman – (redshirt) Senior; 27 Damon Ardis – Sophomore; 35 Leland Shealy – (redshirt) Freshman; 37 Ryan Hines – Sophomore	**Outfielders**: 3 TJ Clarkson – Sophomore; 7 Brad Felder – (redshirt) Sophomore; 8 Nick Orvin – Sophomore; 18 B.J. Phillips – Junior; 29 William Ladd – (redshirt) Sophomore; 31 Will Darby – Freshman

=== Coaches ===
2010 The Citadel Bulldogs baseball coaching staff
- Fred Jordan – Head coach – 19 years
- David Beckley – Assistant coach – 9 years
- Randy Carlson – Assistant coach
- Zach Brown – Assistant coach

=== Schedule ===
Legend
	The Citadel win
	The Citadel loss
	Cancellation
**Bold**	The Citadel team member
*	Non-Conference game

2010 The Citadel Bulldogs baseball game log
Regular season

February
Date	Opponent	Site/stadium	Score	Overall record	SoCon Record
February 19	East Tennessee State*	Joseph P. Riley Jr. Park • Charleston, SC	**W** 4–1	1–0	
February 20	Delaware*	Joseph P. Riley Jr. Park • Charleston, SC	**W** 8–7	2–0	
February 21	Kansas State*	Joseph P. Riley Jr. Park • Charleston, SC	**L** 1–2	2–1	
February 26	St. Joseph's*	Joseph P. Riley Jr. Park • Charleston, SC	**W** 10–5	3–1	
February 27	Marshall*	Joseph P. Riley Jr. Park • Charleston, SC	**W** 4–1	4–1	
February 28	Radford*	Joseph P. Riley Jr. Park • Charleston, SC	**W** 15–4	5–1	

March
Date	Opponent	Site/stadium	Score	Overall record	SoCon Record
March 4	at Hawaii*	Les Murakami Stadium • Honolulu, HI	**W** 12–8	6–1	
March 5	at Hawaii*	Les Murakami Stadium • Honolulu, HI	**W** 9–5	7–1	
March 5	at Hawaii*	Les Murakami Stadium • Honolulu, HI	**L** 0–9^{7}	7–2	
March 6	at Hawaii*	Les Murakami Stadium • Honolulu, HI	**L** 1–13	7–3	
March 10	USC Upstate*	Joseph P. Riley Jr. Park • Charleston, SC	**W** 10–3	8–3	
March 12	Western Carolina	Joseph P. Riley Jr. Park • Charleston, SC	**W** 4–0	9–3	1–0
March 13	Western Carolina	Joseph P. Riley Jr. Park • Charleston, SC	**W** 7–5	10–3	2–0
March 14	Western Carolina	Joseph P. Riley Jr. Park • Charleston, SC	**W** 11–6	11–3	3–0
March 16	VMI*	Joseph P. Riley Jr. Park • Charleston, SC	**L** 3–4	11–4	
March 17	VMI*	Joseph P. Riley Jr. Park • Charleston, SC	**L** 1–12	11–5	
March 19	at Elon	Walter C. Latham Park • Elon, NC	**W** 9–4	12–5	4–0
March 20	at Elon	Walter C. Latham Park • Elon, NC	**W** 20–15^{10}	13–5	5–0
March 21	at Elon	Walter C. Latham Park • Elon, NC	**W** 11–8	14–5	6–0
March 23	Coastal Carolina*	Joseph P. Riley Jr. Park • Charleston, SC	**L** 1–7	14–6	
March 24	Winthrop*	Joseph P. Riley Jr. Park • Charleston, SC	**W** 7–3	15–6	
March 26	Appalachian State	Joseph P. Riley Jr. Park • Charleston, SC	**W** 13–2	16–6	7–0
March 27	Appalachian State	Joseph P. Riley Jr. Park • Charleston, SC	**W** 2–1	17–6	8–0
March 28	Appalachian State	Joseph P. Riley Jr. Park • Charleston, SC	**W** 6–3	18–6	9–0
March 30	at South Carolina*	Carolina Stadium • Columbia, SC	**L** 1–10	18–7	
March 31	Charleston Southern*	Joseph P. Riley Jr. Park • Charleston, SC	**W** 5–0	19–7	

April
Date	Opponent	Site/stadium	Score	Overall record	SoCon Record
April 2	at Wofford	Russell C. King Field • Spartanburg, SC	**W** 3–2	20–7	10–0
April 3	at Wofford	Russell C. King Field • Spartanburg, SC	**L** 11–12	20–8	10–1
April 4	at Wofford	Russell C. King Field • Spartanburg, SC	**W** 8–7^{10}	21–8	11–1
April 6	at Charleston Southern*	Buccaneer Field • North Charleston, SC	**L** 7–8	21–9	
April 7	at Winthrop*	Winthrop Ballpark • Rock Hill, SC	**W** 10–8^{11}	22–9	
April 9	Indiana State*	Joseph P. Riley Jr. Park • Charleston, SC	**W** 4–3	23–9	
April 10	Indiana State*	Joseph P. Riley Jr. Park • Charleston, SC	**L** 7–11	23–10	
April 11	Indiana State*	Joseph P. Riley Jr. Park • Charleston, SC	**L** 2–4	23–11	
April 13	at Coastal Carolina*	Charles Watson Stadium • Conway, SC	**L** 3–7	23–12	
April 14	South Carolina*	Joseph P. Riley Jr. Park • Charleston, SC	**L** 4–10	23–13	
April 16	Furman	Joseph P. Riley Jr. Park • Charleston, SC	**W** 4–2	24–13	12–1
April 17	Furman	Joseph P. Riley Jr. Park • Charleston, SC	**W** 10–5	25–13	13–1
April 18	Furman	Joseph P. Riley Jr. Park • Charleston, SC	**W** 6–5	26–13	14–1
April 20	College of Charleston*	Joseph P. Riley Jr. Park • Charleston, SC	**L** 7–16	26–14	
April 23	Davidson	Joseph P. Riley Jr. Park • Charleston, SC	**L** 2–5	26–15	14–2
April 24	Davidson	Joseph P. Riley Jr. Park • Charleston, SC	**W** 7–0	27–15	15–2
April 24	Davidson	Joseph P. Riley Jr. Park • Charleston, SC	**W** 5–3	28–15	16–2
April 30	at Samford	Joe Lee Griffin Stadium • Homewood, AL	**L** 5–7	28–16	16–3

May
Date	Opponent	Site/stadium	Score	Overall record	SoCon Record
May 1	at Samford	Joe Lee Griffin Stadium • Homewood, AL	**W** 14–6	29–16	17–3
May 2	at Samford	Joe Lee Griffin Stadium • Homewood, AL	**L** 11–12	29–17	17–4
May 7	at College of Charleston	CofC Baseball Stadium at Patriot's Point • Mount Pleasant, SC	**L** 9–13	29–18	17–5
May 8	at College of Charleston	CofC Baseball Stadium at Patriot's Point • Mount Pleasant, SC	**L** 3–7	29–19	17–6
May 9	at College of Charleston	CofC Baseball Stadium at Patriot's Point • Mount Pleasant, SC	**W** 6–3	30–19	18–6
May 11	Mercer	Joseph P. Riley Jr. Park • Charleston, SC	**L** 0–5	30–20	18–6
May 12	at USC Upstate*	Cleveland S. Harley Baseball Park • Spartanburg, SC	**W** 10–3	31–20	
May 14	UNC Greensboro	Joseph P. Riley Jr. Park • Charleston, SC	**W** 8–2	32–20	19–6
May 15	UNC Greensboro	Joseph P. Riley Jr. Park • Charleston, SC	**W** 5–0	33–20	20–6
May 16	UNC Greensboro	Joseph P. Riley Jr. Park • Charleston, SC	**W** 3–1	34–20	21–6
May 18	at Winthrop*	Winthrop Ballpark • Rock Hill, SC	**W** 10–4	35–20	
May 20	at Georgia Southern	J.I. Clements Stadium • Statesboro, GA	**W** 9–4	36–20	22–6
May 21	at Georgia Southern	J.I. Clements Stadium • Statesboro, GA	**W** 7–2	37–20	23–6
May 22	at Georgia Southern	J.I. Clements Stadium • Statesboro, GA	**W** 5–2	38–20	24–6

Post-season

SoCon Tournament
Date	Opponent	Site/stadium	Score	Overall record	SoConT Record
May 26	Furman	Joseph P. Riley Jr. Park • Charleston, SC	**W** 9–5	39–20	1–0
May 27	Elon	Joseph P. Riley Jr. Park • Charleston, SC	**W** 6–3	40–20	2–0
May 29	Elon	Joseph P. Riley Jr. Park • Charleston, SC	**W** 6–5	41–20	3–0
May 30	Western Carolina	Joseph P. Riley Jr. Park • Charleston, SC	**W** 10–3	42–20	4–0

NCAA tournament Columbia Regional
Date	Opponent	Site/stadium	Score	Overall record	SoConT Record
June 4	Virginia Tech	Carolina Stadium • Columbia, SC	**W** 7–2	43–20	1–0
June 5	at South Carolina	Carolina Stadium • Columbia, SC	**L** 4–9	43–21	1–1
June 6	Virginia Tech	Carolina Stadium • Columbia, SC	**L** 3–4	43–22	1–2

== 2011 ==
2011 The Citadel Bulldogs baseball
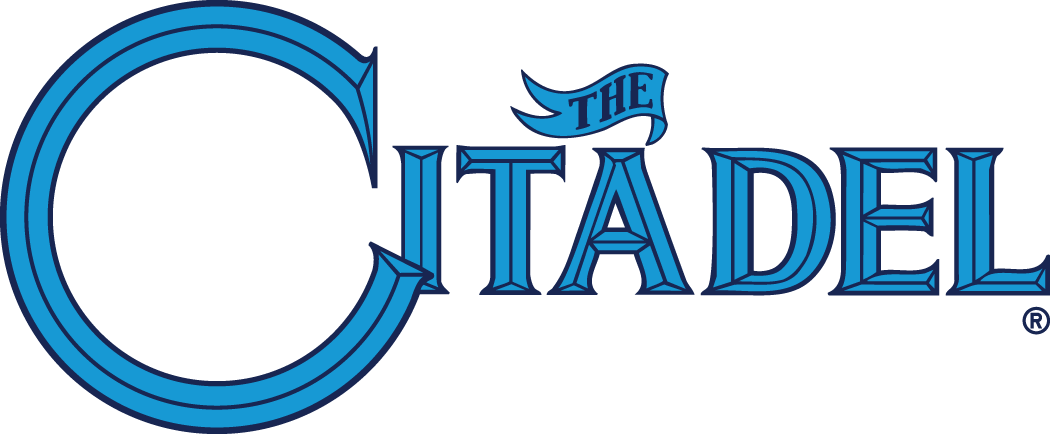
- Conference: Southern Conference
- Record: 20–36 (8–22 SoCon)
- Head coach: Fred Jordan (20th season)
- Assistant coach: David Beckley (10th season)
- Home stadium: Joseph P. Riley Jr. Park

2011 Southern Conference baseball standings
	Conf.				Overall
Team	W		L	PCT	W		L	PCT
Elon ‍†‍‍	23	–	7	.767	36	–	21	.632
UNC Greensboro ‍‍‍	22	–	8	.733	34	–	20	.630
College of Charleston ‍‍‍	18	–	12	.600	39	–	22	.639
Samford ‍‍‍	18	–	12	.600	37	–	23	.617
Georgia Southern ‍‍‡‍^{y}	18	–	12	.600	36	–	26	.581
Appalachian State ‍‍‍	15	–	15	.500	33	–	27	.550
Furman ‍‍‍	13	–	16	.448	24	–	33	.421
Western Carolina ‍‍‍	12	–	18	.400	23	–	31	.426
Wofford ‍‍‍	9	–	21	.300	22	–	33	.400
Davidson ‍‍‍	8	–	21	.276	18	–	30	.375
The Citadel ‍‍‍	8	–	22	.267	20	–	36	.357
† – Conference champion ‡ – SoCon Tournament champion y – Invited to the NCAA tournament As of June 30, 2011; Rankings from Coaches' Poll

This season marked the first time The Citadel finished last in the SoCon and did not qualify for the Southern Conference baseball tournament. This came on the heels of the 2010 regular season and tournament championship, and NCAA Regional appearance. However, the season was marked by some early success, including a win over top–ranked South Carolina, which won national championships in both 2010 and 2011.

=== Roster ===
2011 The Citadel Bulldogs roster
Pitchers: 5 Austin Pritcher – Sophomore; 6 Zach Brownlee – Freshman; 9 Bryce Hines – Freshman; 12 Justin Russell – Freshman; 14 Cam Grimsley – Freshman; 15 Ryan Hines – Freshman; 16 Matt Talley – Senior; 19 Jeremy Long – Junior; 23 TJ Clarkson – Junior; 28 Drew Mahaffey – Senior; 33 Logan Cribb – Freshman; 35 David Leeth – Freshman; Grant Williamson – Freshman	Infielders: 1 Drew DeKerlegand – Freshman; 2 Justin Mackert – Junior; 4 Josh Pless – Sophomore; 10 Laine Frazier – Freshman; 11 Matt Simonelli – Senior; 18 Calvin Orth – Freshman; 20 Legare Jones – Senior; 27 Damon Ardis – Sophomore; 30 Connor Hitchingham – Freshman; Catchers: 13 Ryan Kilgallen – Freshman; 17 Joe Jackson – Freshman; 21 Ryne Hardwick – Freshman; 22 Kirk Sims – Senior; 36 Grant Richards – Junior; Seth Lowe – Freshman	Outfielders: 3 Charles Flowers – Freshman; 7 Brad Felder – Junior; 8 Nick Orvin – Junior; 25 Tyler Griffin – Freshman; 29 William Ladd – Junior; 31 Hughston Armstrong – Freshman; George Coleman – Freshman

=== Coaches ===
2011 The Citadel Bulldogs baseball coaching staff
- Fred Jordan – Head coach – 20th year
- David Beckley – Associate head coach – 10th year
- Randy Carlson – Assistant coach
- Zach Brown – Assistant coach

=== Schedule ===
2011 The Citadel Bulldogs baseball game log
Regular season

February
Date	Opponent	Site/stadium	Score	Win	Loss	Save	Attendance	Overall record	SoCon Record
February 18	Gardner–Webb	Riley Park	5–6	Stackhouse (1–0)	Clarkson (0–1)	Izokovic (1)	557	0–1	–
February 19	Towson	Riley Park	15–1	Pritcher (1–0)	Thompson (0–1)		635	1–1	–
February 20	Towson	Riley Park	1–7	Bugna (1–0)	Russell (0–1)		547	1–2	–
February 20	Gardner-Webb	Riley Park	12–13	Stackhouse (1–0)	Mahaffey (0–1)	Howell (1)	625	1–3	–
February 25	Wright State	Riley Park	2–5	Friedman (1–0)	Talley (0–1)	Braun (1)	342	1–4	–
February 26	Old Dominion	Riley Park	5–2	Pritcher (2–0)	McCarthy (0–1)	Mahaffey (1)	508	2–4	–
February 27	Wright State	Riley Park	2–6	Woytek (0–1)	Russell (0–2)	Schum (1)	412	2–5	–
February 27	Old Dominion	Riley Park	4–3	Long (1–0)	Ney (1–1)	Mahaffey (2)	582	3–5	–

March
Date	Opponent	Site/stadium	Score	Win	Loss	Save	Attendance	Overall record	SoCon Record
March 4	Appalachian State	Riley Park	4–0	Pritcher (3–0)	Hyatt (1–2)		370	4–5	1–0
March 5	Appalachian State	Riley Park	12–4	Russell (1–2)	Pardo (1–1)		485	5–5	2–0
March 5	Appalachian State	Riley Park	4–1	Hines (1–0)	Grant (1–2)	Mahaffey (3)	0 (DH)	6–5	3–0
March 8	Ball State	Riley Park	6–4	Hitchingham (1–0)	Devin (0–1)	Mahaffey (4)	275	7–5	3–0
March 11	Samford	Riley Park	3–4	Putkonen (3–1)	Pritcher (3–1)	Jones (1)	481	7–6	3–1
March 12	Samford	Riley Park	7–8	Irby (1–0)	Mahaffey (0–2)		722	7–7	3–2
March 13	Samford	Riley Park	1–2	Rutledge (3–1)	Clarkson (0–2)	Jones (2)	512	7–8	3–3
March 16	Winthrop	Riley Park	1–3	D'Angelo (2–2)	Hines (1–1)	Lawrence (3)	276	7–9	3–3
March 18	Davidson	Riley Park	4–5	Frongello (2–1)	Mahaffey (0–3)	Bass (2)	307	7–10	3–4
March 19	Davidson	Riley Park	2–1	Talley (1–1)	Horkley (2–2)	Mahaffey (5)	952	8–10	4–4
March 20	Davidson	Riley Park	6–7 (10)	Frongello (3–1)	Hines (1–2)		624	8–11	4–5
March 23	Coastal Carolina	Riley Park	5–6	Hessler (1–0)	Mahaffey (0–4)	Conway (1)	1,110	8–12	4–5
March 25	at Wofford	King Field	3–5	Collins (3–0)	Talley (1–2)	Cornely (3)	253	8–13	4–6
March 27	at Wofford	King Field	4–6	Traylor (2–0)	Pritcher (3–2)	Cornely (4)	0 (DH)	8–14	4–7
March 27	at Wofford	King Field	13–5	Hines (2–2)	Yarusi (0–1)		174	9–14	5–7
March 29	Charleston Southern	Riley Park	12–5	Clarkson (1–2)	Markham (3–3)		427	10–14	5–7
March 30	at South Carolina	Carolina Stadium	4–6	Taylor (2–0)	Cribb (0–1)	Price (6)	6,227	10–15	5–7

April
Date	Opponent	Site/stadium	Score	Win	Loss	Save	Attendance	Overall record	SoCon Record
April 1	at Georgia Southern	J.I. Clements Stadium	3–4	Beck (4–0)	Talley (1–3)	Murray (4)	1,552	10–16	5–8
April 2	at Georgia Southern	J.I. Clements Stadium	2–15	Adams (5–3)	Pritcher (3–3)		2,372	10–17	5–9
April 3	at Georgia Southern	J.I. Clements Stadium	9–11	Middour (2–1)	Long (1–1)	Leverett (1)	1,630	10–18	5–10
April 6	at Winthrop	The Winthrop Ballpark	0–9	D'Angelo (4–4)	Hines (2–3)		468	10–19	5–10
April 8	College of Charleston	Riley Park	6–2	Talley (2–3)	Peterson (4–3)		946	11–19	6–10
April 9	College of Charleston	Riley Park	17–14	Long (2–1)	Owings (0–2)		1,157	12–19	7–10
April 10	College of Charleston	Riley Park	5–10	Powell (4–0)	Russell (1–3)		1,012	12–20	7–11
April 12	#1 South Carolina	Riley Park	2–0	Cribb (1–1)	Neff (2–1)	Clarkson (1)	5,032	13–20	7–11
April 15	at Furman	Latham Park	3–12	Lyne (2–2)	Talley (2–4)		396	13–21	7–12
April 16	at Furman	Latham Park	6–7	Smith (3–4)	Long (2–2)		417	13–22	7–13
April 17	at Furman	Latham Park	9–7(10)	Long (3–2)	Cole (2–1)	Clarkson (2)	519	14–22	8–13
April 19	at Charleston Southern	Buccaneer Ballpark	11–3	Hines (3–3)	Mauldin (0–3)	Hickingham (1)	237	15–22	8–13
April 20	at Coastal Carolina	Charles Watson Stadium	4–7	Coons (3–3)	Cribb (1–2)		1,016	15–23	8–13
April 23	USC Upstate	Riley Park	2–6	DeCecco (4–5)	Talley (2–5)	Waller (1)	0 (DH)	15–24	8–13
April 23	USC Upstate	Riley Park	3–2	Pritcher (4–3)	Roseboom (1–9)	Russell (1)	458	16–24	8–13
April 30	Presbyterian	Riley Park	13–2	Talley (3–5)	Pace (2–6)	Long (1)	587	17–24	8–13

May
Date	Opponent	Site/stadium	Score	Win	Loss	Save	Attendance	Overall record	SoCon Record
May 1	Presbyterian	Riley Park	8–2	Pritcher (5–3)	Mosteller (3–5)	Clarkson (3)	0 (DH)	18–24	8–13
May 1	Presbyterian	Riley Park	5–3	Hines (4–3)	Richardson (4–4)		641 (DH)	19–24	8–13
May 4	Winthrop	Riley Park	7–4	Long (4–2)	Newman (0–4)	Clarkson (4)	472	20–24	8–13
May 6	Elon	Riley Park	6–11	Kernodle (6–1)	Talley (3–6)		3,122	20–25	8–14
May 7	Elon	Riley Park	2–8	Girdwood (4–4)	Russell (1–4)	Conner (7)	457	20–26	8–15
May 8	Elon	Riley Park	6–8	Whitehead (5–1)	Long (4–3)	Kernodle (1)	372	20–27	8–16
May 10	at College of Charleston	CofC Baseball Stadium at Patriot's Point	1–7	Zokan (2–1)	Hines (4–4)	Lucchese (3)	278	20–28	8–16
May 11	USC Upstate	Fluor Field	5–8	Roseboom (3–10)	Cribb (1–3)	Waller (3)	653	20–29	8–16
May 13	at UNC Greensboro	UNCG Baseball Stadium	1–5	Slack (6–1)	Talley (3–7)	Hyatt (1)	178	20–30	8–17
May 14	at UNC Greensboro	UNCG Baseball Stadium	1–5	Brown (1–2)	Russell (1–5)	Miller (2)	295	20–31	8–18
May 15	at UNC Greensboro	UNCG Baseball Stadium	11–12	Smith (3–3)	Clarkson (1–3)		257	20–32	8–19
May 17	Duke	Riley Park	5–7	Van Orden (3–5)	Russell (1–6)		523	20–33	8–19
May 19	at Western Carolina	Hennon Stadium	5–7	Johnson (5–4)	Clarkson (1–4)		287	20–34	8–20
May 20	at Western Carolina	Hennon Stadium	0–6	Smith (6–6)	Russell (1–7)		438	20–35	8–22
May 21	at Western Carolina	Hennon Stadium	8–12	Chilcoat (2–0)	Cribb (1–4)		693	20–36	8–22

=== 2011 MLB draft ===
Pitcher Matt Talley was drafted in the 28th Round, 866th overall, by the Atlanta Braves.

== 2012 ==
2012 The Citadel Bulldogs baseball
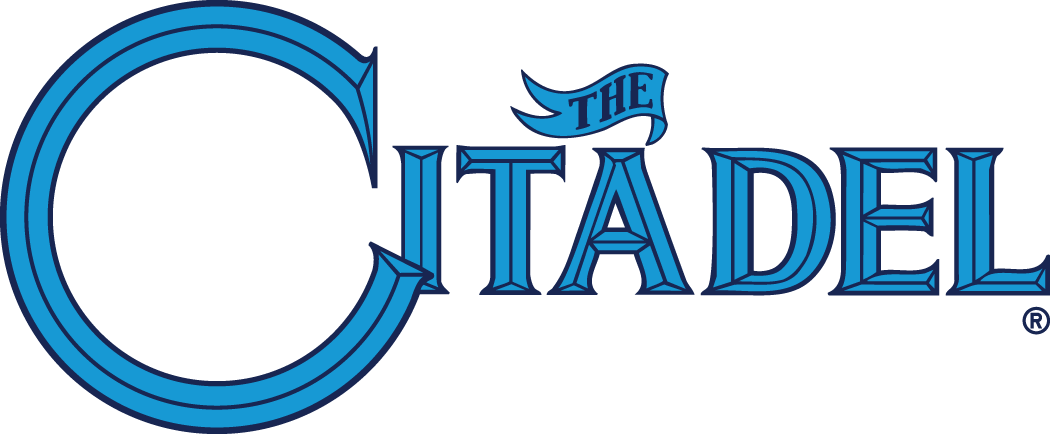
- Conference: Southern Conference
- Record: 25–33 (13–17 SoCon)
- Head coach: Fred Jordan (21st season)
- Assistant coach: David Beckley (11th season)
- Hitting coach: Adam Vrable (1st season)
- Pitching coach: Britt Reames (1st season)
- Home stadium: Joseph P. Riley Jr. Park

2012 Southern Conference baseball standings
	Conf.				Overall
Team	W		L	PCT	W		L	PCT
Appalachian State ‍†‍‍^{y}	21	–	9	.700	38	–	14	.731
College of Charleston ‍†‍‍^{y}	21	–	9	.700	37	–	18	.673
Elon ‍‍‍	20	–	10	.667	31	–	24	.564
Samford ‍‍‡‍^{y}	19	–	11	.633	35	–	21	.625
Western Carolina ‍‍‍	16	–	14	.533	32	–	22	.593
Georgia Southern ‍‍‍	15	–	15	.500	30	–	26	.536
Furman ‍‍‍	13	–	17	.433	26	–	29	.473
The Citadel ‍‍‍	13	–	17	.433	24	–	31	.436
UNC Greensboro ‍‍‍	10	–	20	.333	25	–	27	.481
Davidson ‍‍‍	9	–	21	.300	22	–	32	.407
Wofford ‍‍‍	8	–	22	.267	17	–	31	.354
† – Conference champion ‡ – Tournament champion y – Invited to the NCAA Division I Baseball Championship; As of May 20, 2012; Rankings from Collegiate Baseball

The Bulldogs were picked by both the Southern Conference Media and Coaches to finish 8th in the 11 team Southern Conference. 3B Drew DeKerlegand was named to the first team preseason All-Conference Team, while OF Nick Orvin made the second team. On Saturday April 14, Jordan claimed his 700th career victory in a 3–0 victory over UNC Greenbsoro. The Bulldogs coach is the 36th active member of the 700 win club at the Division I level.

=== Roster ===
2012 The Citadel Bulldogs roster
Pitchers: 5 Austin Pritcher – Junior; 6 Zach Brownlee – (redshirt) Freshman; 7 Logan Cribb – Sophomore; 11 Bryce Hines – Sophomore; 15 Zach Sherrill – Freshman; 16 Kevin Connell – Freshman; 19 Chris Andrews – Freshman; 23 TJ Clarkson – Senior; 24 Connor Walsh – Freshman; 27 Damon Ardis – Junior; 28 James Reeves – Freshman; 30 Brett Tompkins – Freshman; 32 Ryan Hines – Senior; 33 Ross White – Freshman; David Riviera – Junior	Catchers: 12 Corey Smith – Freshman; 13 Ryan Kilgallen – (redshirt) Freshman; 21 Ryne Hardwick – Sophomore; Infielders: 1 Drew DeKerlegan – Sophomore; 4 Johnathan Stokes – Freshman; 9 Robert Moody – Freshman; 10 Bailey Rush – Freshman; 17 Joe Jackson – Sophomore; 18 Calvin Orth – Sophomore; 20 Mason Davis – Freshman; 22 Bo Thompson – Freshman; 35 Alex Christmas – Freshman	Outfielders: 2 Justin Mackert – Senior; 3 Charles Flowers – Sophomore; 8 Nick Orvin – Senior; 14 Hayden Henry – Freshman; 25 Tyler Griffin – Sophomore; 29 George Coleman – (redshirt) Freshman; 31 Hughston Armstrong – Sophomore

=== Coaches ===
2012 The Citadel Bulldogs baseball coaching staff
- Fred Jordan – Head coach – 21st year
- David Beckley – Associate head coach (recruiting) – 11th year
- Britt Reames – Assistant coach (pitching) – 1st year
- Adam Vrable – Assistant coach (hitting) – 1st year

=== Schedule ===
2012 The Citadel Bulldogs baseball game log
Regular season

February
#	Date	Opponent	Site/stadium	Score	Win	Loss	Save	Attendance	Overall record	SoCon Record
1	February 17	Towson	Riley Park	5–6	Trionfo (1–0)	Pritcher (0–1)	Gonnella (1)	752	0–1	–
2	February 18	Richmond	Riley Park	10–7	Reeves (1–0)	Mayers (0–1)		598	1–1	–
3	February 19	Liberty	Riley Park	11–9	Brooks (1–0)	Clarkson (0–1)	Grauer (1)	167	1–2	–
4	February 23	Delaware	Riley Park	2–3	Pearson (1–0)	White (0–1)	Buckland (1)	388	1–3	–
5	February 24	Delaware	Riley Park	0–5	Young (1–0)	Connell (0–1)		296	1–4	–
6	February 25	Delaware	Riley Park	12–8	Reeves (2–0)	Soren (0–1)	Sherrill (1)	361	2–4	–
7	February 26	Delaware	Riley Park	3–2	Cribb (1–0)	Kuhl (0–1)	Clarkson (1)	221	3–4	–

March
#	Date	Opponent	Site/stadium	Score	Win	Loss	Save	Attendance	Overall record	SoCon Record
8	March 1	Columbia	Riley Park	4–1	Pritcher (1–1)	Lowery (0–1)	Sherrill (2)	163	4–4	–
9	March 3	Columbia	Riley Park	2–0 (7)	Reeves (3–0)	Olson (0–1)		117	5–4	–
10	March 3	Columbia	Riley Park	7–11 (12)	Tax (1–0)	White (0–2)		218	5–5	–
11	March 4	Columbia	Riley Park	5–4 (7)	Hines (1–0)	Spinosa (0–1)		218	6–5	–
12	March 6	USC Upstate	Riley Park	5–6	Sobotka (1–0)	Hines (1–1)		134	6–6	–
13	March 9	Western Carolina	Riley Park	4–2	Pritcher (2–1)	Smith (1–2)	Clarkson (2)	218	7–6	1–0
14	March 10	Western Carolina	Riley Park	4–11	McKinney (3–1)	Reeves (3–1)		433	7–7	1–1
15	March 11	Western Carolina	Riley Park	5–6	Hatcher (2–0)	White (0–3)		382	7–8	1–2
16	March 14	Winthrop	Riley Park	9–2	Reeves (4–1)	Knox (0–4)		216	8–8	1–2
17	March 16	@Appalachian State	Smith Stadium	5–10	Arrowood (4–0)	Reeves (4–2)	Hyatt (7)	279	8–9	1–3
18	March 17	@Appalachian State	Smith Stadium	4–9	Grant (3–1)	Hines (0–1)		788	8–10	1–4
19	March 18	@Appalachian State	Smith Stadium	6–7	Marcello (3–0)	Cribb (1–1)		532	8–11	1–5
20	March 20	Charleston Southern	Riley Park	4–0	Clarkson (1–1)	Buran (0–3)		814	9–11	1–5
21	March 23	@Minnesota	Metrodome	1–2	Ghelfi (2–0)	Connell (0–2)		224	9–12	1–5
22	March 24	@Minnesota	Metrodome	0–3	Snelton (2–1)	Hines (0–2)	Kray (4)	262	9–13	1–5
23	March 25	@Minnesota	Metrodome	0–5	Lubinksy (1–2)	Cribb (1–2)		240	9–14	1–5
24	March 27	#10 South Carolina	Riley Park	3–7	Montgomery (1–0)	Tompkins (0–1)		4,417	9–15	1–5
25	March 30	Wofford	Riley Park	8–4	Pritcher (3–1)	Yarusi (2–3)		212	10–15	2–5
26	March 31	Wofford	Riley Park	2–8	Morris (2–1)	Clarkson (1–2)	Eck (6)	172	10–16	2–6

April
#	Date	Opponent	Site/stadium	Score	Win	Loss	Save	Attendance	Overall record	SoCon Record
27	April 1	Wofford	Riley Park	8–7 (10)	Hines (2–1)	Wilson (1–3)		317	11–16	3–6
28	April 3	Coastal Carolina	Riley Park	3–0	Connell (1–2)	Reynoso (2–1)	Hines (2)	1,013	12–16	3–6
29	April 4	@Charleston Southern	Buccaneer Ballpark	2–5	Hagaman (2–0)	Tompkins (0–2)	Deighan (3)	279	12–17	3–6
30	April 6	@Samford	Joe Lee Griffin Stadium	5–10	Putkonen (2–4)	Pritcher (3–2)	Irby (5)	312	12–18	3–7
31	April 6	@Samford	Joe Lee Griffin Stadium	3–11	Basford (5–0)	Reeves (4–3)		DH	12–19	3–8
32	April 7	@Samford	Joe Lee Griffin Stadium	5–4	Hines (3–1)	Irby (3–1)		412	13–19	4–8
33	April 10	@South Carolina	Carolina Stadium	0–8	Belcher (2–1)	Clarkson (1–3)		7,129	13–20	4–8
34	April 11	@Coastal Carolina	Charles Watson Stadium	2–6	Smith (1–1)	Hines (0–3)	Connolly (7)	1,078	13–21	4–8
35	April 13	UNC Greensboro	Riley Park	3–0	Pritcher (4–2)	Hollstegge (3–4)		287	14–21	5–8
36	April 14	UNC Greensboro	Riley Park	5–4	Reeves (5–3)	Gilliam (2–2)	Hines (3)	312	15–21	6–8
37	April 15	UNC Greensboro	Riley Park	8–7	Hines (1–3)	James (1–2)		242	16–21	7–8
38	April 17	@Winthrop	The Winthrop Ballpark	10–3	Walsh (1–0)	Johnson (1–6)		372	17–21	7–8
39	April 20	@College of Charleston	CofC Baseball Stadium at Patriot's Point	4–8	Renfro (6–3)	Pritcher (4–3)		568	17–22	7–10
40	April 21	@College of Charleston	CofC Baseball Stadium at Patriot's Point	2–7	Powell (7–2)	Connell (1–3)		649	17–23	7–11
41	April 22	@College of Charleston	CofC Baseball Stadium at Patriot's Point	5–6 (11)	Peterson (1–1)	Clarkson (1–4)		190	17–24	7–11
42	April 27	Georgia Southern	Riley Park	4–1	Pritcher (5–3)	Beck (4–5)	Hines (4)	473	18–24	8–11
43	April 28	Georgia Southern	Riley Park	2–5	Hess (3–2)	Connell (1–4)	Leverett (4)	315	18–25	8–12
44	April 29	Georgia Southern	Riley Park	8–7	Reeves (6–3)	Middour (2–3)	Hines (5)	348	19–25	9–12

May
#	Date	Opponent	Site/stadium	Score	Win	Loss	Save	Attendance	Overall record	SoCon Record
45	May 1	North Florida	Riley Park	3–6	Organ (4–2)	Tompkins (0–3)	Jagodzinski (3)	144	19–26	9–12
46	May 2	North Florida	Riley Park	5–1	Cribb (2–2)	Herrmann (2–1)		132	20–26	9–12
47	May 4	@Davidson	Wilson Field	2–6	Sisson (4–2)	Pritcher (5–4)		215	20–27	9–13
48	May 6	@Davidson	Wilson Field	15–2	Clarkson (2–4)	Overcash (3–8)		342	21–27	10–13
49	May 6	@Davidson	Wilson Field	2–0	Reeves (7–3)	Beeker (2–3)	Hines (6)	342	22–27	11–13
50	May 8	@USC Upstate	Cleveland S. Harley Baseball Park	Canceled						
51	May 11	Furman	Riley Park	7–0	Pritcher (6–4)	Lyne (5–5)		444	23–27	12–13
52	May 12	Furman	Riley Park	3–1	Clarkson (3–4)	Smith (4–5)	Hines (7)	384	24–27	13–13
53	May 13	Furman	Riley Park	6–8 (12)	Warford (4–0)	Tompkins (0–4)		327	24–28	13–14
54	May 17	@Elon	Walter C. Latham Park	1–2	Clark (9–3)	Pritcher (6–5)	Young (9)	266	24–29	13–15
55	May 18	@Elon	Walter C. Latham Park	5–18	Darnell (2–2)	Reeves (6–4)		248	24–30	13–16
56	May 19	@Elon	Walter C. Latham Park	2–4	Medick (2–3)	Cribb (3–3)	Young (10)	263	24–31	13–17

Post-season

SoCon Tournament
#	Date	Opponent	Site/stadium	Score	Win	Loss	Save	Attendance	Overall record	SoConT Record
57	May 23	#2 College of Charleston	Fluor Field at the West End	8–6 (11)	Clarkson (4–4)	Peterson (1–3)		1,162	25–31	1–0
58	May 24	#6 Georgia Southern	Fluor Field at the West End	1–8	Hess (5–3)	Connell (1–5)	Leverett (7)	1,820	25–32	1–1
59	May 25	#3 Elon	Fluor Field at the West End	3–7	Whitehead (5–3)	Cribb (3–4)		1,364	25–33	1–2

== 2013 ==
2013 The Citadel Bulldogs baseball
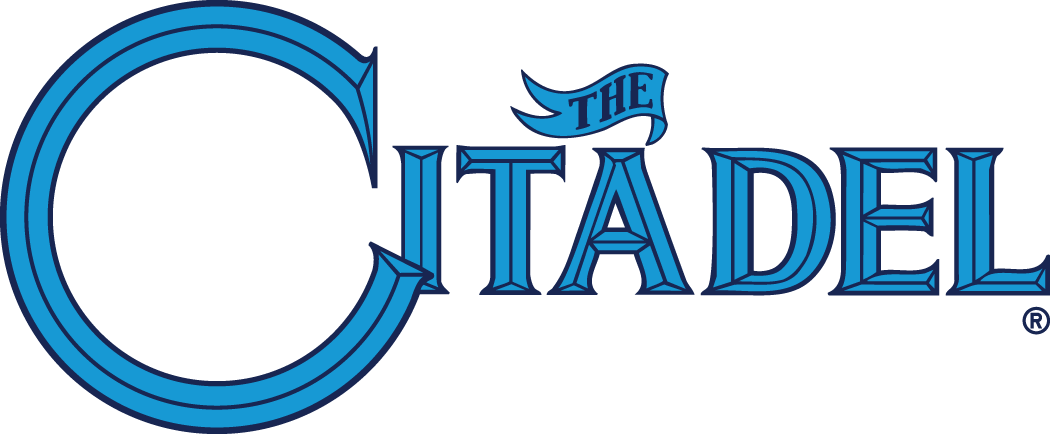
- Conference: Southern Conference
- Record: 35–25 (18–12 SoCon)
- Head coach: Fred Jordan (22nd season)
- Assistant coach: David Beckley (12th season)
- Hitting coach: Adam Vrable (2nd season)
- Pitching coach: Britt Reames (2nd season)
- Home stadium: Joseph P. Riley Jr. Park

2013 Southern Conference baseball standings
	Conf.				Overall
Team	W		L	PCT	W		L	PCT
Western Carolina ‍†‍‍	23	–	7	.767	39	–	20	.661
College of Charleston ‍‍‍	18	–	11	.621	31	–	26	.544
Elon ‍‍‡‍^{y}	18	–	11	.621	34	–	30	.531
The Citadel ‍‍‍	18	–	12	.600	35	–	25	.583
Appalachian State ‍‍‍	13	–	14	.481	30	–	24	.556
Furman ‍‍‍	14	–	16	.467	32	–	25	.561
Georgia Southern ‍‍‍	13	–	17	.433	27	–	32	.458
Samford ‍‍‍	12	–	17	.414	27	–	30	.474
Davidson ‍‍‍	12	–	18	.400	18	–	31	.367
UNC Greensboro ‍‍‍	11	–	19	.367	24	–	31	.436
Wofford ‍‍‍	10	–	20	.333	20	–	36	.357
† – Conference champion ‡ – Tournament champion y – Invited to the NCAA tournament As of June 30, 2013; Rankings from Collegiate Baseball

=== Roster ===
2013 The Citadel Bulldogs baseball team
Players
Coaches

#	Pos.	Name	B/T	Height	Weight	Year	Home town
1	OF	Drew DeKerlegand	L/R	5 ft 10 in (1.78 m)	200 lb (91 kg)	Jr	Pearland High School	Pearland, TX
2	RHP	David Rivera	R/R	6 ft 1 in (1.85 m)	220 lb (100 kg)	Jr	El Camino College	Upland, CA
3	INF	Bret Hines	R/R	5 ft 10 in (1.78 m)	165 lb (75 kg)	Fr	Hanahan High School	Hanahan, SC
4	INF	Jonathan Stokes	R/R	5 ft 10 in (1.78 m)	165 lb (75 kg)	So	Cheraw High School	Cheraw, SC
5	RHP	Austin Pritcher	R/R	6 ft 1 in (1.85 m)	200 lb (91 kg)	Sr	James Island High School	James Island, SC
6	RHP	Zach Brownlee	L/R	6 ft 2 in (1.88 m)	190 lb (86 kg)	So	Holly Hill Academy	St. George, SC
7	LHP	Logan Cribb	L/L	5 ft 10 in (1.78 m)	200 lb (91 kg)	Jr	Rock Hill High School	Rock Hill, SC
8	OF	Brett Bullard	L/R	5 ft 10 in (1.78 m)	185 lb (84 kg)	RS Sr	Northwood Academy	Charleston, SC
9	OF	Jason Smith	R/L	6 ft 1 in (1.85 m)	175 lb (79 kg)	Fr	Gilbert High School	Gilbert, SC
10	INF	Bailey Rush	L/R	6 ft 0 in (1.83 m)	200 lb (91 kg)	So	Pinecrest High School	Pinehurst, NC
11	RHP	Layton Meacham	R/R	6 ft 1 in (1.85 m)	185 lb (84 kg)	Fr	Mauldin High School	Mauldin, SC
12	RHP	Brett Tompkins	R/R	6 ft 5 in (1.96 m)	230 lb (104 kg)	So	Riverside High School	Greer, SC
13	C	Ryan Kilgallen	R/R	6 ft 2 in (1.88 m)	180 lb (82 kg)	So	Stratford High School	Goose Creek, SC
14	RHP	Skylar Hunter	R/R	6 ft 1 in (1.85 m)	185 lb (84 kg)	Fr	Hanahan High School	Hanahan, SC
15	RHP	Zach Sherrill	R/R	6 ft 3 in (1.91 m)	215 lb (98 kg)	So	Wilson Hall High School	Sumter, SC
16	LHP	Kevin Connell	L/L	6 ft 2 in (1.88 m)	230 lb (104 kg)	So	Daniel Boone High School	Johnson City, TN
17	C	Joe Jackson	L/R	6 ft 1 in (1.85 m)	195 lb (88 kg)	Jr	Mauldin High School	Mauldin, SC
18	INF	Calvin Orth	R/R	6 ft 1 in (1.85 m)	190 lb (86 kg)	Jr	Episcopal High School	Jacksonville, FL
19	C	Stephen Windham	R/R	6 ft 0 in (1.83 m)	190 lb (86 kg)	Fr	Summerville High School	Summerville, SC
20	INF	Mason Davis	S/R	5 ft 9 in (1.75 m)	170 lb (77 kg)	So	Redan High School	Conyers, GA
21	INF	Ryne Hardwick	R/R	6 ft 2 in (1.88 m)	200 lb (91 kg)	Sr	Conway High School	Conway, SC
22	INF	Bo Thompson	R/R	5 ft 10 in (1.78 m)	255 lb (116 kg)	So	J. L. Mann High School	Mauldin, SC
23	RHP	Austin Livingston	R/R	6 ft 1 in (1.85 m)	200 lb (91 kg)	Fr	Ashley Ridge High School	Summerville, SC
24	LHP	Connor Walsh	l/L	6 ft 3 in (1.91 m)	185 lb (84 kg)	So	Jupiter Community High School	Jupiter, FL
25	OF	Tyler Griffin	S/R	6 ft 1 in (1.85 m)	185 lb (84 kg)	Jr	Gainesville High School	Gainesville, FL
27	RHP	Austin Mason	R/R	6 ft 2 in (1.88 m)	200 lb (91 kg)	Fr	Eastside High School	Greer, SC
28	LHP	James Reeves	R/L	6 ft 3 in (1.91 m)	200 lb (91 kg)	So	Ashley Ridge High School	Summerville, SC
29	RHP	Zach Lavery	R/R	6 ft 1 in (1.85 m)	175 lb (79 kg)	Fr	Goose Creek High School	Goose Creek, SC
30	C	Corey Smith	S/R	5 ft 10 in (1.78 m)	200 lb (91 kg)	So	Concord High School	Concord, NC
31	OF	Hughston Armstrong	L/L	5 ft 7 in (1.7 m)	165 lb (75 kg)	Jr	Ridge View High School	Columbia, SC
32	RHP	Ryan Hines	R/R	5 ft 10 in (1.78 m)	210 lb (95 kg)	Sr	Hanahan High School	Hanahan, SC
33	LHP	Ross White	L/L	5 ft 9 in (1.75 m)	170 lb (77 kg)	So	Marion High School	Marion, SC
34	RHP	Zach Wimmer	R/R	6 ft 2 in (1.88 m)	210 lb (95 kg)	Fr	Cane Bay High School	Ladson, SC
35	INF	Robert Moody	R/R	5 ft 6 in (1.68 m)	160 lb (73 kg)	RS Fr	James Island High School	James Island, SC
36	LHP	Nate Brecklin	R/L	6 ft 1 in (1.85 m)	205 lb (93 kg)	Fr	Eustis High School	Eustis, FL
	RHP	Justin Brownlee	R/R	6 ft 1 in (1.85 m)	190 lb (86 kg)	Fr	Holly Hill Academy	St. George, SC
	INF	Alex Christmas	R/R	5 ft 6 in (1.68 m)	170 lb (77 kg)	Fr	Ashley Ridge High School	Summerville, SC
	OF	Steven Hansen	R/L	6 ft 0 in (1.83 m)	165 lb (75 kg)	Fr	Pinewood Preparatory School	Summerville, SC
	OF	Drew Joiner	R/R	5 ft 9 in (1.75 m)	175 lb (79 kg)	Fr	Riverside High School	Greer, SC
	RHP	Paul Joseph Krouse	R/R	6 ft 5 in (1.96 m)	190 lb (86 kg)	Fr	Sumter High School	Sumter, SC
	RHP	Colton Rolader	R/R	5 ft 9 in (1.75 m)	165 lb (75 kg)	Fr	Berkeley High School	Moncks Corner, SC

Head coach

Fred Jordan

Assistant coach(es)

David Beckley

Hitting coach(es)

Adam Vrable

Pitching coach(es)

Britt Reames

Legend

- (C) Team captain
- (S) Suspended
- (I) Ineligible
- Injured
- Current redshirt

Roster
Last update: February 17, 2013

=== Schedule ===
2013 The Citadel Bulldogs baseball game log
Regular season

February
Date	Opponent	Site/stadium	Score	Win	Loss	Save	Attendance	Overall record	SoCon Record
Feb 15	George Mason	Riley Park • Charleston, SC	9–1	Pritcher (1–0)	Montefusco (0–1)	none	310	1–0	0–0
Feb 16	Kansas State	Riley Park • Charleston, SC	10–8	Reeves (1–0)	Flattery (0–1)	none	200	2–0	0–0
Feb 17	High Point	Riley Park • Charleston, SC	2–7	Avidon (1–0)	Cribb (0–1)	none	346	2–1	0–0
Feb 20	Winthrop	Riley Park • Charleston, SC	6–4	Rivera (1–0)	Kmiec (0–1)	Hunter (1)	375	3–1	0–0
Feb 22	@ North Florida	Harmon Stadium • Jacksonville, FL	6–3 (11)	Rivera (2–0)	Cardwell (0–1)	none	432	4–1	0–0
Feb 23	@ North Florida	Harmon Stadium • Jacksonville, FL	8–9	Hermann (2–0)	White (0–1)	none	406	4–2	0–0
Feb 24	@ North Florida	Harmon Stadium • Jacksonville, FL	3–4	Renner (1–0)	Hunter (0–1)	none	323	4–3	0–0
Feb 26	UNC Asheville	Riley Park • Charleston, SC	postponed						
Feb 27	@ Charleston Southern	Buccaneer Ballpark • North Charleston, SC	6–8	Schroff (2–0)	Brecklin (0–1)	Weekley (1)	241	4–4	0–0

March
Date	Opponent	Site/stadium	Score	Win	Loss	Save	Attendance	Overall record	SoCon Record
Mar 1	Pittsburgh	Riley Park • Charleston, SC	8–0	Pritcher (2–0)	Mildren (1–1)	none	275	5–4	0–0
Mar 2	VCU	Riley Park • Charleston, SC	6–11	Buckley (1–0)	Reeves (1–1)	Lees (4)	240	5–5	0–0
Mar 3	UNC Asheville	Riley Park • Charleston, SC	7–5	Mason (1–0)	Connolly (1–1)	Hunter (2)		6–5	0–0
Mar 3	UNC Asheville	Riley Park • Charleston, SC	5–3	Cribb (1–1)	Houmard (0–1)	Rivera (1)	300	7–5	0–0
Mar 6	@ Winthrop	Winthrop Ballpark • Rock Hill, SC	3–1	Connell (1–0)	Kmiec (0–2)	Hunter (3)	325	8–5	0–0
Mar 8	Samford*	Riley Park • Charleston, SC	12–3	Pritcher (3–0)	Irby (2–2)	None	305	9–5	1–0
Mar 9	Samford*	Riley Park • Charleston, SC	2–1	Hunter (1–1)	Wright (2–1)	None	604	10–5	2–0
Mar 10	Samford*	Riley Park • Charleston, SC	8–14	Handlan (1–0)	Mason (1–1)	None	435	10–6	2–1
Mar 12	Akron	Riley Park • Charleston, SC	7–1	Tompkins (1–0)	Dyer (0–2)	None	208	11–6	2–1
Mar 13	Akron	Riley Park • Charleston, SC	9–3	Livingston (2–0)	Steensen (0–1)	Hunter (4)	211	12–6	2–1
Mar 15	@ Wofford*	King Field • Spartanburg, SC	5–4	Milburn (2–0)	Pritcher (3–1)	Eck (3)	307	12–7	2–2
Mar 16	@ Wofford*	King Field • Spartanburg, SC	9–8	Rivera (3–0)	Milburn (2–1)	Hunter (5)	521	13–7	3–2
Mar 17	@ Wofford*	King Field • Spartanburg, SC	18–9	Mason (2–1)	Leftwich (1–2)	None	461	14–7	4–2
Mar 19	#5 South Carolina	Riley Park • Charleston, SC	5–9	Wynkoop (4–0)	Cribb (1–2)	Webb (8)	5,838	14–8	4–2
Mar 20	@ College of Charleston	CofC Baseball Stadium at Patriot's Point • Mount Pleasant, SC	7–11	West (2–0)	Meecham (0–1)	None	412	14–9	4–2
Mar 22	Charleston Southern	Riley Park • Charleston, SC	6–4	Sherrill (1–0)	Gunther (2–3)	Hunter (6)	217	14–9	4–2
Mar 23	@ Charleston Southern	Buccaneer Ballpark • North Charleston, SC	Postponed. Makeup date TBA						
Mar 24	Charleston Southern	Riley Park • Charleston, SC	Postponed. Makeup date TBA						
Mar 26	@ #16 Georgia Tech	Russ Chandler Stadium • Atlanta, GA	4–5	Clay (2–0)	Hunter (1–2)	None	873	15–10	4–2
Mar 29	@ Western Carolina	Hennon Stadium • Cullowhee, NC	6–7	Null (3–1)	Pritcher (3–2)	Hatcher (7)	129	15–11	4–3
Mar 30	@ Western Carolina	Hennon Stadium • Cullowhee, NC	4–5	Hatcher (2–2)	Hunter (1–3)	None	317	15–12	4–4
Mar 31	@ Western Carolina	Hennon Stadium • Cullowhee, NC	5–4	Rivera (4–0)	Powell (1–2)	Hunter (7)	264	16–12	5–4

April
Date	Opponent	Site/stadium	Score	Win	Loss	Save	Attendance	Overall record	SoCon Record
Apr 2	Coastal Carolina	Riley Park • Charleston, SC	2–3	Kerr (2–0)	Connell (0–1)	None	1,253	16–13	5–4
Apr 3	@ Coastal Carolina	Charles Watson Stadium • Conway, SC	2–10	Poole (4–1)	Tompkins (1–1)	None	1,531	16–14	5–4
Apr 5	Elon	Riley Park • Charleston, SC	5–8	Clark (4–2)	Sherrill (1–1)	MacDonald (2)	274	16–15	5–5
Apr 6	Elon	Riley Park • Charleston, SC	7–14	Cribb (2–2)	Manez (1–3)	None	335	17–15	6–5
Apr 7	Elon	Riley Park • Charleston, SC	6–8	Medick (5–1)	Mason (2–2)	Young (7)	407	17–16	6–6
Apr 9	@ #12 South Carolina	Carolina Stadium • Columbia, SC	5–6	Britt (2–0)	Rivera (4–1)	None	7,721	17–17	6–6
Apr 12	@ Georgia Southern	J. I. Clements Stadium • Statesboro, GA	11– 0	Pritcher (4–2)	Howard (5–4)	None	1,735	18–17	7–6
Apr 13	@ Georgia Southern	J. I. Clements Stadium • Statesboro, GA	1–0 (11)	Rivera (5–1)	Rowe (3–1)	Hunter (8)	1,407	19–17	8–6
Apr 14	@ Georgia Southern	J. I. Clements Stadium • Statesboro, GA	8–2	Mason (3–2)	Richman (4–3)	None	927	20–17	9–6
Apr 17	East Tennessee State	Riley Park • Charleston, SC	7–3	Livingston (3–0)	Krieg (2–4)	None	261	21–17	9–6
Apr 19	Appalachian State	Riley Park • Charleston, SC	6–3	Sherrill (2–1)	Nunn (7–3)	Hunter (9)	281	22–17	10–6
Apr 20	Appalachian State	Riley Park • Charleston, SC	5–3	Cribb (3–2)	Agnew-Weiland (5–3)	Hunter (10)	323	23–17	11–6
Apr 21	Appalachian State	Riley Park • Charleston, SC	8–7	Hunter (2–3)	Thurber (2–1)	None	426	24–17	12–6
Apr 23	Charleston Southern	Riley Park • Charleston, SC	8–5	Livingston (4–0)	Shelton (1–2)	Hunter (11)	316	25–17	12–6
Apr 26	@ Furman	Latham Baseball Stadium • Greenville, SC	6–0	Pritcher (5–2)	Smith (4–3)	None	492	26–17	13–6
Apr 27	@ Furman	Latham Baseball Stadium • Greenville, SC	13–7	Sherrill (3–1)	Abrams (3–1)	None		27–17	14–6
Apr 28	@ Furman	Latham Baseball Stadium • Greenville, SC	10–14	de Gruy (2–1)	Connell (0–2)	None	346	27–18	14–7

May
Date	Opponent	Site/stadium	Score	Win	Loss	Save	Attendance	Overall record	SoCon Record
May 1	@ #2 North Carolina	Boshamer Stadium • Chapel Hill, NC	0–13	Johnson (3–0)	Livingston (4–1)	None	925	27–19	14–7
May 3	Davidson	Riley Park • Charleston, SC	22–7	Pritcher (6–2)	Lowe (4–7)	White (1)	345	28–19	15–7
May 4	Davidson	Riley Park • Charleston, SC	4–6	Mooney (5–4)	Cribb (3–3)	Saeta (2)		28–20	15–8
May 5	Davidson	Riley Park • Charleston, SC	8–12	Bain (2–4)	Mason (3–3)	None	301	28–21	15–9
May 10	College of Charleston	Riley Park • Charleston, SC	7–1	Pritcher (7–2)	Zokan (3–2)	None	1,227	29–21	16–9
May 11	College of Charleston	Riley Park • Charleston, SC	7–1	Cribb (4–3)	West (4–2)	None	1,010	30–21	17–9
May 12	College of Charleston	Riley Park • Charleston, SC	5–7	Pegler (4–2)	Mason (3–4)	Watts (6)	907	30–22	17–10
May 14	@ Charleston Southern	Buccaneer Ballpark • North Charleston, SC	21–6	Connell (1–2)	Mauldin (1–1)	None	212	31–22	17–10
May 16	@ UNC Greensboro	UNCG Baseball Stadium • Greensboro, NC	12–2	Pritcher (8–2)	Thompson (1–4)	None	354	32–22	18–10
May 17	@ UNC Greensboro	UNCG Baseball Stadium • Greensboro, NC	11–13	Clark (5–1)	Hunter (2–4)	None	478	32–23	18–11
May 18	@ UNC Greensboro	UNCG Baseball Stadium • Greensboro, NC	4–7	James (2–1)	Livingston (4–2)	Clark (2)	508	32–24	18–12

Post-season

SoCon Tournament
Date	Opponent	Site/stadium	Score	Win	Loss	Save	Attendance	Overall record	SoConT Record
May 22	(5) Appalachian State	Fluor Field at the West End • Greenville, SC	6–5	Hunter 3–4	Thurber (3–2)	None	544	33–24	1–0
May 23	(1) Western Carolina	Fluor Field at the West End • Greenville, SC	12–11	Reeves (2–1)	Nadale (0–3)	Hunter (12)	689	34–24	2–0
May 25	(5) Appalachian State	Fluor Field at the West End • Greenville, SC	8–6	Reeves (3–1)	Spring (3–4)	Hunter (13)	1,034	35–24	3–0
May 26	(3) Elon	Fluor Field at the West End • Greenville, SC	6–5	Webb (7–3)	Pritcher (8–3)	Medick (1)	1,432	35–25	3–1

=== Honors and awards ===
SoCon Pitcher of the Year

- Austin Pritcher

All-Conference First Team

- Austin Pritcher (Media and Coaches)
- Joe Jackson (Media and Coaches)

All-Conference Second Team

- Hughston Armstrong (Media and Coaches)
- Bo Thompson (Media and Coaches)
- Skylar Hunter (Media and Coaches)
- Mason Davis (Coaches)
- Calvin Orth (Media)

SoCon All-Freshman Team

- Skylar Hunter

SoCon Player of the Month

- Tyler Griffin (February)

SoCon Pitcher of the Month

- Austin Pritcher (February)
- Austin Pritcher (April)

Collegiate Baseball Hitter of the Week

- Tyler Griffin (February 18 – February 24)

SoCon Player of the Week

- Drew DeKerlegand (March 4)
- Bo Thompson (March 18)
- Jonathan Stokes (April 29)

SoCon Pitcher of the Week

- Austin Pritcher (April 29)
- Austin Pritcher (May 13)

== 2014 ==
2014 The Citadel Bulldogs baseball
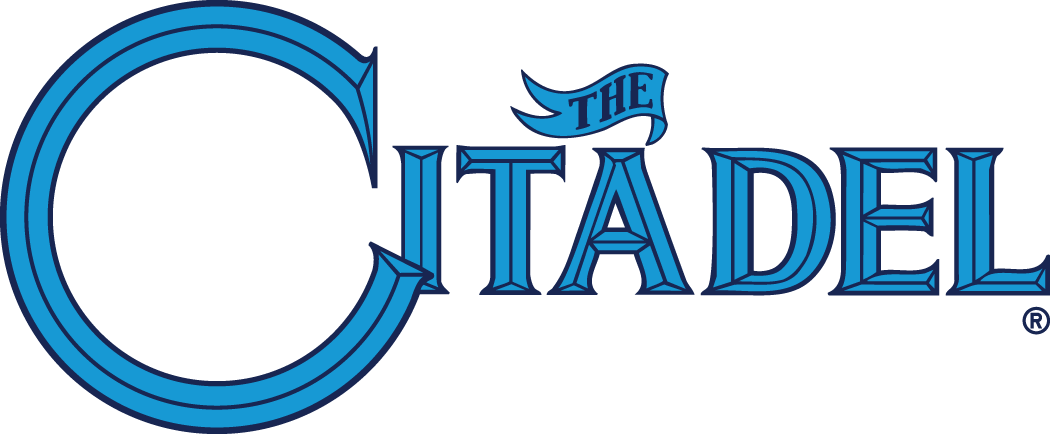
- Conference: Southern Conference
- Record: 24–34 (8–18 SoCon)
- Head coach: Fred Jordan (23rd season)
- Assistant coach: David Beckley (13th season)
- Hitting coach: Justin Mackert (1st season)
- Pitching coach: Britt Reames (3rd season)
- Home stadium: Joseph P. Riley Jr. Park

2014 Southern Conference baseball standings
	Conf.				Overall
Team	W		L	PCT	W		L	PCT
Western Carolina ‍†‍‍	20	–	6	.769	37	–	18	.673
Davidson ‍‍‍	17	–	8	.680	29	–	19	.604
Georgia Southern ‍‍‡‍^{y}	15	–	12	.556	40	–	23	.635
Samford ‍‍‍	15	–	12	.556	35	–	25	.583
Wofford ‍‍‍	12	–	14	.462	32	–	28	.533
Appalachian State ‍‍‍	12	–	14	.462	21	–	34	.382
Elon ‍‍‍	12	–	15	.444	27	–	26	.509
Furman ‍‍‍	11	–	15	.423	26	–	32	.448
UNC Greensboro ‍‍‍	8	–	16	.333	21	–	28	.429
The Citadel ‍‍‍	8	–	18	.308	24	–	34	.414
† – Conference champion ‡ – Tournament champion y – Invited to the NCAA tournament As of June 30, 2014; Rankings from Collegiate Baseball

=== Roster ===
2014 The Citadel Bulldogs roster
Pitchers: 2 – David Rivera – Senior; 6 – Zach McKay – Freshman; 7 – Logan Cribb – Senior; 11 – Layton Meacham – Sophomore; 12 – Brett Tompkins – Senior; 14 – Skylar Hunter – Sophomore; 15 – Zach Sherrill – Junior; 16 – Kevin Connell – Junior; 23 – Austin Livingston – Sophomore; 27 – Austin Mason – Sophomore; 28 – James Reeves – Junior; 29 – Zach Lavery – (redshirt) Freshman; 32 – Paul Joseph Krouse – (redshirt) Freshman; 33 – Ross White – Junior; 34 – Matt Hill – Senior; 35 – Kevin Dobbins – Freshman; 36 – Nate Brecklin – Sophomore; – Christopher Kellahan – Freshman	Catchers: 13 – Ryan Kilgallen – Senior; 19 – Stephen Windham – Sophomore; 30 – Chandler Hammond – Freshman; – Glenn Daniels – Freshman; – Brian Lapchak – Freshman; – Beau Strickland – Freshman; – Wilson Wicker – Freshman; Infielders: 3 – Bret Hines – Sophomore; 4 – Johnathan Stokes – Junior; 5 – Barrett Charpia – Freshman; 10 – Bailey Rush – Junior; 18 – Calvin Orth – Senior; 20 – Mason Davis – Junior; 22 – Bo Thompson – Junior; – Blaine Hill – Freshman; – Grey Klosinski – Freshman	Outfielders: 1 – Drew DeKerlegand – Senior; 8 – Steven Hansen – (redshirt) Freshman; 9 – Jason Smith – Sophomore; 17 – Austin Mapes – Freshman; 24 – Connor Walsh – Junior; 25 – Tyler Griffin – Senior; 31 – Hughston Armstrong – Senior; – Alex Christmas – Junior; – Mike Deese – Junior; – Drew Joiner – (redshirt) Freshman; – Zach Paquette – Freshman

=== Coaches ===
2014 The Citadel Bulldogs baseball coaching staff
- Fred Jordan – Head coach – 23rd year
- David Beckley – Associate head coach (recruiting) – 13th year
- Britt Reames – Assistant coach (pitching) – 3rd year
- Justin Mackert – Assistant coach (hitting) – 1st year

=== Schedule ===
Severe weather along the East Coast delayed Delaware's arrival in Charleston for the opening weekend tournament, and canceled many other games around the Southeast. As a result, Virginia Tech was a late addition to the tournament field and played the opening game against the Bulldogs on February 14.

2014 The Citadel Bulldogs baseball game log
Regular season

February
Date	Opponent	Site/stadium	Score	Win	Loss	Save	Attendance	Overall record	SoCon Record
Feb 14	Virginia Tech	Riley Park • Charleston, SC	6–2	Reeves (1–0)	McIntyre (0–1)	None	520	1–0	
Feb 15	#8 Louisville	Riley Park • Charleston, SC	5–3	Sherrill (1–0)	McGrath (0–1)	Hunter (1)	1,122	2–0	
Feb 16	West Virginia	Riley Park • Charleston, SC	2–10	Means (1–0)	Livingston (0–1)	None	925	2–1	
Feb 18	@ USC Upstate	Cleveland S. Harley Baseball Park • Spartanburg, SC	2–6	Manupelli (1–0)	Connell (0–1)	Seeba (1)	129	2–2	
Feb 21	Oklahoma	Jay Bergman Field • Orlando, FL	7–9	Hayes (1–0)	Cribb (0–1)	Garza (1)	500	2–3	
Feb 22	Ohio State	Jay Bergman Field • Orlando, FL	4–5	Post (1–0)	Hunter (0–1)	None	500	2–4	
Feb 23	@ UCF	Jay Bergman Field • Orlando, FL	7–9	Olson (1–0)	Livingston (0–2)	Martin (1)	1,349	2–5	
Feb 25	Rhode Island	Riley Park • Charleston, SC	4–3	Tompkins (1–0)	Mantle (0–1)	Hunter (2)	210	3–5	
Feb 26	Charlotte	Riley Park • Charleston, SC	8–4	Sherrill (2–0)	Hudson (0–1)	None	110	4–5	
Feb 28	Nebraska	Riley Park • Charleston, SC	6–3	Cribb (1–1)	Christian (1–1)	Hunter (3)	252	5–5	

March
Date	Opponent	Site/stadium	Score	Win	Loss	Save	Attendance	Overall record	SoCon Record		
Mar 1	Nebraska	Riley Park • Charleston, SC	12–8	Reeves (2–0)	Bummer (1–2)	None	587	6–5			
Mar 2	Nebraska	Riley Park • Charleston, SC	0–4	Sinclair (2–0)	Connell (0–2)	None	707	6–6			
Mar 4	Coastal Carolina	Riley Park • Charleston, SC	Postponed to March 25								
Mar 5	Toledo	Riley Park • Charleston, SC	1–8	Shutes (1–0)	Tompkins (1–1)	None	124	6–7			
Mar 8	College of Charleston	Riley Park • Charleston, SC	5–4 (11)	Hunter (1–1)	Hanzlik (0–1)	None	1,430	7–7			
Mar 9	@ College of Charleston	CofC Baseball Stadium at Patriot's Point • Mount Pleasant, SC	5–11	Clarke (3–1)	Reeves (2–1)	None	1,010	7–8			
Mar 10	College of Charleston	Riley Park • Charleston, SC	0–8	Ober (4–0)	Connell (0–3)	None	832	7–9			
Mar 12	USC Upstate	Riley Park • Charleston, SC	9–8	Sherrill (3–0)	Miller (0–1)	Hunter (4)	175	8–9			
Mar 14	@ Davidson	T. Henry Wilson, Jr. Field • Davidson, NC	3–13	Bain (1–1)	Cribb (1–2)	None	312	8–10	0–1		
Mar 15	@ Davidson	T. Henry Wilson, Jr. Field • Davidson, NC	1–2	Mooney (3–1)	Hunter (1–2)	None	477	8–11	0–2		
Mar 15	@ Davidson	T. Henry Wilson, Jr. Field • Davidson, NC	8–10	Goldberg (2–2)	Livingston (0–3)	None		8–11	0–3		
Mar 18	South Carolina	Riley Park • Charleston, SC	Postponed to April 16								
Mar 19	@ Winthrop	Winthrop Ballpark • Rock Hill, SC	3–2	Mason (1–0)	Sightler (1–1)	Hunter (5)	237	9–12			
Mar 21	Samford	Riley Park • Charleston, SC	3–5	Ledford (4–1)	Cribb (1–3)	Gracia (5)	255	9–13	0–4		
Mar 22		{{{tv}}}	Samford	Riley Park • Charleston, SC	W 4–2	'Reeves' (3–1)	Brasher (0–2)	'Hunter' (6)	444	10–13	1–4
Mar 23			Samford	Riley Park • Charleston, SC	L 3–8	Milazzo (3–1)	'Mason' (1–1)	None ()	461	10–14	1–5
Mar 25			Coastal Carolina*	Riley Park • Charleston, SC	W 12–4	'White' (1–0)	Schaefer (3–3)	None ()	192	11–14	
Mar 26			Charleston Southern	Riley Park • Charleston, SC	W 10–3	'Livingston' (1–3)	Pickard (0–1)	None ()	375	12–14	
Mar 28			Elon	Walter C. Latham Park • Elon, NC	L 3–6	Bakker (5–1)	'Cribb' (1–4)	Pennell (6)	102	12–15	1–6
Mar 29			Elon	Walter C. Latham Park • Elon, NC	L 7–14	Elefante (6–0)	'Reeves' (3–2)	None ()		12–16	1–7
Mar 30			Elon	Walter C. Latham Park • Elon, NC	L 3–4	Stalzer (4–2)	'Sherrill' (3–1)	Pennell (7)	120	12–17	1–8

April
Date	Opponent	Site/stadium	Score	Win	Loss	Save	Attendance	Overall record	SoCon Record
Apr 1	@ Coastal Carolina	Charles Watson Stadium • Conway, SC	W 3–2 (10)	Hunter (2–2)	Poole (0–1)	None	700	13–17	
Apr 4	Georgia Southern	Riley Park • Charleston, SC	L 4–7	Howard (4–3)	White (1–1)	McCall (6)	509	13–18	1–9
Apr 5	Georgia Southern	Riley Park • Charleston, SC	L 1–10	Wirsu (6–2)	Livingston (1–4)	None		13–19	1–10
Apr 5	Georgia Southern	Riley Park • Charleston, SC	L 2–5	Richman (5–0)	Mason (1–2)	McCall (7)	484	13–20	1–11
Apr 9	@ East Tennessee State	Thomas Stadium • Johnson City, TN	L 4–12	Jacques (2–3)	Tompkins (1–2)	None	603	14–20	
Apr 11	@ Appalachian State	Smith Stadium • Boone, NC	W 8–2	Cribb (2–4)	Nunn (3–5)	None	337	14–21	2–11
Apr 12	@ Appalachian State	Smith Stadium • Boone, NC	L 5–6	Moore (7–2)	White (1–2)	None	787	15–21	2–12
Apr 13	@ Appalachian State	Smith Stadium • Boone, NC	L 6–10	Springs (2–1)	Tompkins (1–3)	None	444	15–22	2–13
Apr 16	#11 South Carolina	Riley Park • Charleston, SC	W 10–8	Livingston (2–4)	Vogel (0–1)	Hunter (7)	6,500 (Note: The Bulldogs game against South Carolina drew the largest crowd to see a college game at Riley Park, surpassing the 2012 Clemson vs. South Carolina game by nearly 700 fans.)	15–23	
Apr 19	@ Western Carolina	Hennon Stadium • Cullowhee, NC	L 4–5	Fussell (3–2)	Hunter (2–3)	Powell (8)	293	15–24	2–14
Apr 20	@ Western Carolina	Hennon Stadium • Cullowhee, NC	L 2–8					15–25	2–15
Apr 20	@ Western Carolina	Hennon Stadium • Cullowee, NC	Canceled						
Apr 22	Winthrop	Riley Park • Charleston, SC	W 7–4	Lavery (1–0)	Crohan (1–3)	Hunter (8)	302	16–25	
Apr 25	Furman	Riley Park • Charleston, SC	W 5–4	Lavery (2–0)	Warford (2–3)	Hunter (9)	327	17–25	3–15
Apr 26	Furman	Riley Park • Charleston, SC	W 10–9	Rivera (1–0)	Warford (2–4)	Hunter (10)	444	18–25	4–15
Apr 27	Furman	Riley Park • Charleston, SC	L 6–8	Wood (5–1)	Livingston (2–5)	None	482	18–26	4–16

May
Date	Opponent	Site/stadium	Score	Win	Loss	Save	Attendance	Overall record	SoCon Record
May 2	Wofford	Riley Park • Charleston, SC	W 8–1	Cribb (3–4)	Morris (7–6)	None	375	19–26	5–16
May 3	Wofford	Riley Park • Charleston, SC	L 0–1	Stillman (3–2)	Hunter (2–4)	Eck (10)	414	19–27	5–17
May 4	Wofford	Riley Park • Charleston, SC	L 1–11	Leftwich (4–5)	Livingston (2–6)	None	392	19–28	5–18
May 6	@ Charleston Southern	Buccaneer Ballpark • North Charleston, SC	L 7–12	Nations (2–1)	Rivera (1–1)	None	180	19–29	
May 8	UNC Wilmington	Riley Park • Charleston, SC	W 1–0	Cribb (4–4)	Batts (5–3)	Hunter (11)	333	20–29	
May 9	UNC Wilmington	Riley Park • Charleston, SC	L 0–2	Ramsey (2–3)	Mason (1–4)	Secrest (4)	415	20–30	
May 11	@ UNC Wilmington	Brooks Field • Wilmington, NC	L 3–9	Shepley (2–0)	Livingston (2–7)	None	1,289	20–31	
May 13	@ South Carolina	Carolina Stadium • Columbia, SC	L 1–10	Scott (2–0)	Brecklin (0–1)	None	8,054	20–32	
May 16	UNC Greensboro	Riley Park • Charleston, SC	W 7–5	Lavery (3–0)	Clark (3–6)	Hunter (12)	260	21–32	6–18
May 17	UNC Greensboro	Riley Park • Charleston, SC	W 13–12	Meacham (1–0)	Frazier (1–3)	Hunter (13)		22–32	7–18
May 17	UNC Greensboro	Riley Park • Charleston, SC	W 14–11	Lavery (4–0)	Long (1–1)	Hunter (14)	377	23–32	8–18

Post-season

SoCon Tournament
Date	Opponent	Site/stadium	Score	Win	Loss	Save	Attendance	Overall record	SoConT Record
May 20	Elon	Riley Park • Charleston, SC	W 10–7	Sherrill (4–1)	Harris (3–3)	Hunter (15)	910	24–32	1–0
May 21	Davidson	Riley Park • Charleston, SC	L 7–9	Mooney (6–3)	Mason (1–5)	Goldberg (8)		24–33	1–1
May 22	Wofford	Riley Park • Charleston, SC	L 2–4	Morris (9–6)	Livingston (2–8)	Eck (12)		24–34	31–27

== 2015 ==
2015 The Citadel Bulldogs baseball
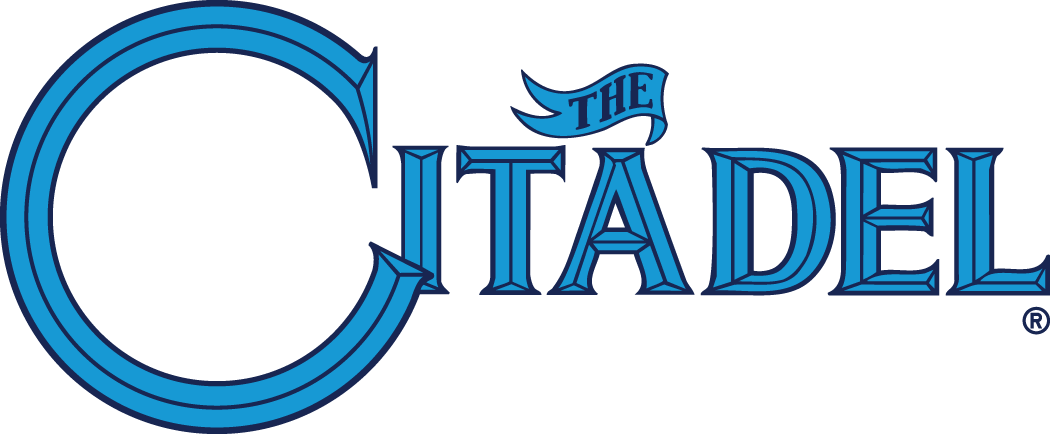
- Conference: Southern Conference
- Record: 28–30 (10–14 SoCon)
- Head coach: Fred Jordan (24th season)
- Assistant coach: David Beckley (14th season)
- Hitting coach: Aaron Gershenfield (1st season)
- Pitching coach: Britt Reames (4th season)
- Home stadium: Joseph P. Riley Jr. Park

2015 Southern Conference baseball standings
	Conf.				Overall
Team	W		L	PCT	W		L	PCT
Mercer ‍‍‍	16	–	7	.696	31	–	21	.596
Samford ‍‍‍	14	–	10	.583	29	–	24	.547
Wofford ‍‍‍	13	–	10	.565	36	–	20	.643
VMI ‍‍‍	12	–	12	.500	20	–	28	.417
UNC Greensboro ‍‍‍	12	–	12	.500	23	–	25	.479
Furman ‍‍‍	11	–	13	.458	24	–	31	.436
Western Carolina ‍‍‍	11	–	13	.458	21	–	28	.429
The Citadel ‍‍‍	10	–	14	.417	25	–	28	.472
East Tennessee State ‍‍‍	8	–	16	.333	21	–	34	.382
‡ – Tournament champion As of May 16, 2015; Rankings from Collegiate Baseball

=== Roster ===
2015 The Citadel Bulldogs roster
Pitchers: 7 – J. P. Sears – Freshman; 11 – Layton Meacham – Junior; 12 – Brett Tompkins – Senior; 14 – Skylar Hunter – Junior; 15 – Zach Sherrill – Senior; 16 – Kevin Connell – Senior; 18 – William Kinney – Freshman; 20 – Chris Kellahan – (redshirt) Freshman; 23 – Austin Livingston – Junior; 25 – Thomas Byelick – Freshman; 27 – Austin Mason – Junior; 28 – James Reeves – (redshirt) Junior; 29 – Zach Lavery – (redshirt) Sophomore; 32 – Jordan Buster – Freshman; 33 – Ross White – Senior; 34 – Mark Pipkin – Freshman; 36 – Nate Brecklin – Junior; 37 – Ryan Stamler – Freshman; – Wills Chapman – Freshman; – Grey Hoke – Freshman; – Paul Joseph Krouse – (redshirt) Sophomore; – Zach McKay – Sophomore; – Cody Mitchell – Freshman; – Kyle Smith – Freshman	Catchers: 6 – Stephen Windham – Junior; 13 – Ryan Kilgallen – Senior; 30 – Beau Strickland – (redshirt) Freshman; – Justin Craft – Freshman; Infielders: 2 – Philip Watcher – Freshman; 3 – Bret Hines – Junior; 4 – Johnathan Stokes – Senior; 10 – Bailey Rush – Senior; 22 – Drew Ellis – Freshman; 24 – Connor Walsh – Senior; 31 – Jacob Watcher – Freshman; – Grey Klosinski – (redshirt) Freshman	Outfielders: 1 – Shy Phillips – Freshman; 5 – Barrett Charpia – Sophomore; 8 – Steven Hansen – (redshirt) Sophomore; 9 – Jason Smith – (redshirt) Sophomore; 17 – Austin Mapes – Sophomore; 19 – Clay Martin – Freshman; 21 – Mike Deese – (redshirt) Junior; – Taylor Cothran – Freshman; – Ricky Hartzog – Freshman; -Kyle

=== Coaches ===
2015 The Citadel Bulldogs baseball coaching staff
- Fred Jordan – Head coach – 24th year
- David Beckley – Associate head coach (recruiting) – 14th year
- Britt Reames – Assistant coach (pitching) – 4th year
- Aaron Gershenfield – Assistant coach (hitting) – 1st year

=== Schedule ===
2015 The Citadel Bulldogs baseball game log
Regular season

February
Date	Opponent	Site/stadium	Score	Win	Loss	Save	Attendance	Overall record	SoCon Record
Feb 13	Air Force	Riley Park • Charleston, SC	W 5–3	Reeves (1–0)	Jax (0–1)	Hunter (1) (Note: Skylar Hunter recorded his 29th career save, tying the school record held by Hank Kraft.)	510	1–0	
Feb 14	Air Force	Riley Park • Charleston, SC	W 8–3	Sears (1–0)	Stanford (0–1)	None	N/A	2–0	
Feb 14	Air Force	Riley Park • Charleston, SC	W 6–5	Mason (1–0)	DeVries (0–1)	Hunter (2) (Note: Hunter recorded his 30th career save, claiming the top spot on the school's all-time list.)	644	3–0	
Feb 17	at North Florida	Harmon Stadium • Jacksonville, FL	L 9–16	Andrews (1–0)	Lavery (0–1)	None	170	3–1	
Feb 20	at College of Charleston	CofC Baseball Stadium at Patriot's Point • Mount Pleasant, SC	L 7–8^{11}	Glazer (1–0)	Hunter (0–1)	None	486	3–2	
Feb 21	College of Charleston	Riley Park • Charleston, SC	L 4–6	Bauer (1–1)	Livingston (0–1)	Henry (1)	735	3–3	
Feb 22	at College of Charleston	CofC Baseball Stadium at Patriot's Point • Mount Pleasant, SC	L 3–4	Helvey (1–1)	Sears (1–1)	McCutcheon (2)	1,035	3–4	
Feb 24	at Georgia Southern	J. I. Clements Stadium • Statesboro, GA	W 3–2	Sears (2–1)	Slate	Hunter (3)	654	4–4	
Feb 27	Alabama State	Riley Park • Charleston, SC	W 9–8	Hunter (1–1)	Ruiz (0–1)	None	215	5–4	
Feb 28	Alabama State	Riley Park • Charleston, SC	L 14–15	Estevez (1–0)	Connell (0–1)	Ruiz (2)	226	5–5	

March
Date	Opponent	Site/stadium	Score	Win	Loss	Save	Attendance	Overall record	SoCon Record
March 4	Coastal Carolina	Riley Park • Charleston, SC	L 1–5	Morrison (1–0)	Hunter (0–1)	None	260	5–6	
March 6	Elon	Riley Park • Charleston, SC	L 3–12	Harris (2–0)	Sears (2–2)	None	148	5–7	
March 7	Elon	Riley Park • Charleston, SC	W 11–8	White (1–0)	Lucas (1–3)	Hunter (4)	354	6–7	
March 8	Elon	Riley Park • Charleston, SC	W 6–1	Reeves (2–0)	Welhaf (0–1)	Hunter (5)	414	7–7	
March 13	Lafayette	Riley Park • Charleston, SC	W 3–1	Sears (3–2)	Bednar (0–2)	Hunter (6)	160	8–7	
March 14	Lafayette	Riley Park • Charleston, SC	W 7–4	Reeves (3–0)	Leeds (1–1)	Hunter (7)	247	9–7	
March 15	Lafayette	Riley Park • Charleston, SC	W 16–2	Livingston (1–1)	Houck (0–2)	None	445	10–7	
March 17	Georgia Southern	Riley Park • Charleston, SC	W 4–3	White (2–0)	Fagan (0–2)	Hunter (8)	211	11–7	
March 18	Winthrop	Riley Park • Charleston, SC	W 6–5	Tompkins (1–0)	Strain (2–2)	None	345	12–7	
March 20	UMBC	Riley Park • Charleston, SC	W 13–6	Reeves (4–0)	Little (0–2)	None	277	13–7	
March 21	UMBC	Riley Park • Charleston, SC	W 5–3	Sears (4–2)	Vanderplas (1–3)	Hunter (9)		14–7	
March 22	UMBC	Riley Park • Charleston, SC	L 5–8	Mikush (1–0)	Hunter (1–3)	None	425	14–8	
March 24	at Winthrop	Winthrop Ballpark • Rock Hill, SC	L 4–11	Strong (3–1)	Mason (1–1)		311	14–9	
March 27	at Western Carolina	Hennon Stadium • Cullowhee, NC	L 2–7	Nobles (3–0)	Reeves (4–1)	None	369	14–10	0–1
March 28	at Western Carolina	Hennon Stadium • Cullowhee, NC	L 5–12	Davis (1–2)	Sherrill (0–1)	None	598	14–11	0–2
March 29	at Western Carolina	Hennon Stadium • Cullowhee, NC	L 9–12	Powell (1–0)	Hunter (1–4)	None	405	14–12	0–3
March 31	#22 South Carolina	Riley Park • Charleston, SC	L 0–2	Mincey (1–1)	Byelick (1–1)	Widener (7)	5,972	14–13	

April
Date	Opponent	Site/stadium	Score	Win	Loss	Save	Attendance	Overall record	SoCon Record
Apr 2	Mercer	Riley Park • Charleston, SC	W 4–0	Reeves (5–1) (Note: Reeves threw a no-hitter against the Bears, recording a line of 9 IP, 0H, 5 BB, and 14 K.)	Nyquist (4–2)	None	430	15–13	1–3
Apr 3	Mercer	Riley Park • Charleston, SC	L 3–4	Papelian (4–1)	Sears (4–3)	Kourtis (2)	373	15–14	1–4
Apr 4	Mercer	Riley Park • Charleston, SC	L 0–17	Askew (4–3)	Byelick (0–2)	None	426	15–15	1–5
Apr 8	at #26 South Carolina	Carolina Stadium • Columbia, SC	L 2–4	Fiori (3–0)	Watcher (0–1)	Widener (8)	8,075	15–16	
Apr 10	Wofford	Riley Park • Charleston, SC	L 1–5	Milburn (8–0)	Reeves (5–2)	Condra-Bogan (2)	447	15–17	1–6
Apr 11	Wofford	Riley Park • Charleston, SC	W 4–3	Hunter (2–4)	Kulman (5–2)	None	375	16–17	2–6
Apr 12	Wofford	Riley Park • Charleston, SC	L 6–7	Lance (4–1)	Lavery (0–2)	Stillman (11)	334	16–18	2–7
Apr 17	at UNC Greensboro	UNCG Baseball Stadium • Greensboro, NC	L 0–5	Clark (6–3)	Reeves (5–3)	None	635	16–19	2–8
Apr 18	at UNC Greensboro	UNCG Baseball Stadium • Greensboro, NC	L 4–5	Stafford (3–1)	Hunter (2–5)	None		16–20	2–9
Apr 18	at UNC Greensboro	UNCG Baseball Stadium • Greensboro, NC	W 8–7	Connell (1–1)	Bates (0–3)	None	723	17–20	3–9
Apr 21	Charleston Southern	Riley Park • Charleston, SC	W 3–2	Byelick (1–2)	Lee (1–2)	Hunter (10)	311	18–20	
Apr 22	North Florida	Riley Park • Charleston, SC	L 8–9	Naylor (6–0)	Livingston (1–2)	Olmstead (7)	251	18–21	
Apr 24	VMI	Riley Park • Charleston, SC	L 7–8	Gomersall (2–1)	Lavery (0–3)	Edens (10)	447	18–22	3–10
Apr 26	VMI	Riley Park • Charleston, SC	L 6–10	Woods (5–1)	Sears (4–4)	None		18–23	3–11
Apr 26	VMI	Riley Park • Charleston, SC	L 2–3	Barbery (5–2)	Byelick (1–3)	Edens (11)	475	18–24	3–12
Apr 28	at Charleston Southern	Buccaneer Ballpark • North Charleston, SC	L 2–7	Tomasovich (7–4)	Watcher (0–2)	None	322	18–25	

May
Date	Opponent	Site/stadium	Score	Win	Loss	Save	Attendance	Overall record	SoCon Record
May 1	at Samford	Joe Lee Griffin Stadium • Birmingham, AL	W 6–4	Reeves (6–3)	Ledford (6–4)	Hunter (11)	646	19–25	4–12
May 2	at Samford	Joe Lee Griffin Stadium • Birmingham, AL	W 13–6	Sears (5–4)	Curry (6–5)	None	392	20–25	5–12
May 3	at Samford	Joe Lee Griffin Stadium • Birmingham, AL	L 3–4^{10}	Gracia (1–0)	Hunter (2–6)	None	333	20–26	5–13
May 8	East Tennessee State	Riley Park • Charleston, SC	W 9–1	Reeves (7–3)	Krieg (2–7)	None	393	21–26	6–13
May 9	East Tennessee State	Riley Park • Charleston, SC	W 12–8	Connell (2–1)	Nesselt (4–6)	None	408	22–26	7–13
May 10	East Tennessee State	Riley Park • Charleston, SC	W 15–5	Byelick (2–3)	Simpler (2–5)	None	305	23–26	8–13
May 12	Presbyterian	Riley Park • Charleston, SC	L 3–6	Sauer (5–4)	Livingston (1–3)	Deal (3)	288	23–27	
May 14	at Furman	Latham Baseball Stadium • Greenville, SC	W 5–4^{10}	Hunter (3–6)	Warford (4–4)	None	326	24–27	9–13
May 15	at Furman	Latham Baseball Stadium • Greenville, SC	L 8–9	Griffith (1–1)	Mason (1–2)	Warford (6)	427	24–28	9–14
May 16	at Furman	Latham Baseball Stadium • Greenville, SC	W 1–0	Byelick (3–3)	Gaddis (3–6)	Hunter (12)	507	25–28	10–14

Post-season

SoCon Tournament
Date	Opponent	Site/stadium	Score	Win	Loss	Save	Attendance	Overall record	SoConT Record
May 19	(9) East Tennessee State	Riley Park • Charleston, SC	W 8–2	Reeves (8–3)	Nesselt (5–7)	None	748	26–28	1–0
May 21	(1) Mercer	Riley Park • Charleston, SC	L 2–3	Nyquist (8–2)	Sears (5–5)	Kourtis (3)		26–29	1–1
May 21	(5) UNC Greensboro	Riley Park • Charleston, SC	W 8–4	Mason (2–2)	Stafford (4–3)	None		27–29	2–1
May 22	(4) VMI	Riley Park • Charleston, SC	W 10–5	Mason (3–2)	Heenan (1–7)	Hunter (13)	1,066	28–29	3–1
May 23	(1) Mercer	Riley Park • Charleston, SC	L 1–8					28–30	3–2

== 2016 ==
2016 The Citadel Bulldogs baseball
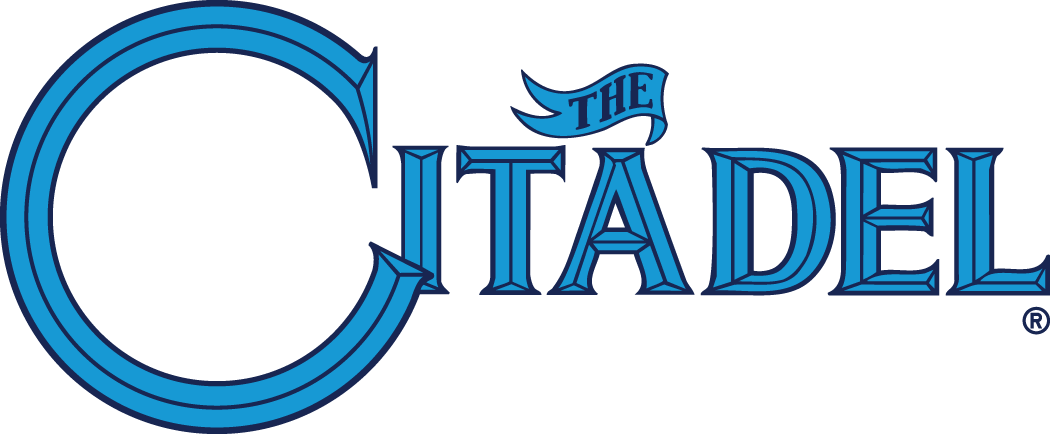
- Conference: Southern Conference
- Record: 16–35 (6–14 SoCon)
- Head coach: Fred Jordan (25th season)
- Assistant coach: David Beckley (15th season)
- Hitting coach: Austin Pritcher (1st season)
- Pitching coach: Britt Reames (5th season)
- Home stadium: Joseph P. Riley Jr. Park

2016 Southern Conference baseball standings
	Conf.				Overall
Team	W		L	PCT	W		L	PCT
Mercer ‍†‍‍	16	–	8	.667	38	–	23	.623
Western Carolina ‍‍‡‍^{y}	15	–	9	.625	31	–	31	.500
UNC Greensboro ‍‍‍	15	–	9	.625	38	–	21	.644
Furman ‍‍‍	14	–	10	.583	29	–	30	.492
Samford ‍‍‍	13	–	11	.542	35	–	26	.574
East Tennessee State ‍‍‍	13	–	11	.542	27	–	30	.474
Wofford ‍‍‍	12	–	12	.500	30	–	28	.517
The Citadel ‍‍‍	6	–	18	.250	17	–	42	.288
VMI ‍‍‍	4	–	20	.167	21	–	35	.375
† – Conference champion ‡ – Tournament champion y – Invited to the NCAA tournament As of June 11, 2016; Rankings from Collegiate Baseball

=== Roster ===
The Bulldogs suspended three starters, Drew Ellis, Austin Mapes, and Phillip Watcher, on March 30, 2016, for violations of team rules and dismissed them on April 6. Phillip Watcher's twin brother Jacob remained on the team.

2016 The Citadel Bulldogs roster
Pitchers: 7 – J. P. Sears – Sophomore; 10 – Jordan Merritt – Freshman; 11 – Chris Kellahan – Junior; 20 – Dylan Spence – Freshman; 23 – Morgan Foulks – Freshman; 25 – Thomas Byelick – Sophomore; 27 – Alex Bialakis – Freshman; 28 – Grey Hoke – (redshirt) Freshman; 29 – Zach Lavery – (redshirt) Junior; 30 – Beau Strickland – Junior; 32 – Jordan Buster – (redshirt) Freshman; 33 – Johnny Croley – Freshman; 34 – Mark Pipkin – (redshirt) Freshman; 35 – Zach McKay – (redshirt) Sophomore; 36 – Nate Brecklin – (redshirt) Junior; 37 – Ryan Stamler – (redshirt) Freshman; 38 – Kyle Smith – (redshirt) Freshman; – Wills Chapman – Sophomore; – James 'Bo' Harrell – Freshman; – Noah Watts – Freshman	Catchers: 6 – Stephen Windham – Senior; 13 – Justin Craft – (redshirt) Freshman; 14 – Cole Buffington – Freshman; – Sean Harris – Freshman; Infielders: 3 – Bret Hines – Senior; 5 – Barrett Charpia – Junior; 18 – William Kinney – Sophomore; 24 – Ben Peden – Freshman; 31 – Jacob Watcher – Sophomore	Outfielders: 1 – Shy Phillips – Sophomore; 4 – Clay Martin – Sophomore; 8 – Steven Hansen – Senior; 9 – Jason Smith – Senior; 19 – Taylor Cothran – (redshirt) Freshman; 21 – Mike Deese – Senior; – Jared Hair – Freshman; – Marcus Millhouse – Freshman

=== Coaches ===
2016 The Citadel Bulldogs baseball coaching staff
- Fred Jordan – Head coach – 25th year
- David Beckley – Associate head coach (recruiting) – 15th year
- Britt Reames – Assistant coach (pitching) – 5th year
- Austin Pritcher – Assistant coach – 1st year

=== Schedule ===
2016 The Citadel Bulldogs baseball game log
Regular season

February
Date	Opponent	Site/stadium	Score	Win	Loss	Save	Attendance	Overall record	SoCon Record
February 19	Virginia Tech*	Joseph P. Riley Jr. Park • Charleston, SC	W 4–2	Sears (1–0)	Naughton (0–1)	Lavery (1)	402	1–0	
February 20	Virginia Tech*	Joseph P. Riley Jr. Park • Charleston, SC	W 5–4	J. Watcher (1–0)	Woodcock (0–1)	Lavery (2)	575	2–0	
February 21	Virginia Tech*	Joseph P. Riley Jr. Park • Charleston, SC	L 0–12	Scheetz (1–0)	Foulks (0–1)	None	437	2–1	
February 26	Siena*	Joseph P. Riley Jr. Park • Charleston, SC	W 14–2	Sears (2–0)	Goossens (0–1)	None	342	3–1	
February 27	Siena*	Joseph P. Riley Jr. Park • Charleston, SC	W 3–2	Lavery (1–0)	Nolan (0–1)	None	513	4–1	
February 28	Siena*	Joseph P. Riley Jr. Park • Charleston, SC	W 6–4	Smith (1–0)	Miller (0–2)	Lavery (3)		5–1	

March
Date	Opponent	Site/stadium	Score	Win	Loss	Save	Attendance	Overall record	SoCon Record
March 1	#18 South Carolina*	Joseph P. Riley Jr. Park • Charleston, SC	L 3–6	Hill (2–0)	J. Watcher (1–1)	Reagan (3)	6,298	5–2	
March 4	College of Charleston*	Joseph P. Riley Jr. Park • Charleston, SC	L 1–5	Helvey (2–0)	Sears (2–1)	None	311	5–3	
March 5	at College of Charleston*	CofC Baseball Stadium at Patriot's Point • Mount Pleasant, SC	L 0–1	Ober (1–1)	Byelick (0–1)	Love (2)	895	5–4	
March 6	College of Charleston*	Joseph P. Riley Jr. Park • Charleston, SC	L 9–12	Ocker (1–0)	Spence (0–1)	Love (3)	709	5–5	
March 8	USC Upstate*	Joseph P. Riley Jr. Park • Charleston, SC	L 1–7	Jackson (2–1)	Stamler (0–1)	None	122	5–6	
March 9	Richmond*	Joseph P. Riley Jr. Park • Charleston, SC	W 6–2	Watcher (2–1)	Bovenzi (0–1)	None	476	6–6	
March 11	at Elon*	Walter C. Latham Park • Elon, NC	W 13–2	Stamler (1–1)	Beaulac (0–3)	None	261	7–6	
March 12	at Elon*	Walter C. Latham Park • Elon, NC	L 3–5	Conroy (1–1)	Buster (0–1)	Hall (4)	237	7–7	
March 13	at Elon*	Walter C. Latham Park • Elon, NC	L 3–8	Conroy (2–1)	Croley (0–1)	None	101	7–8	
March 15	#19 Clemson*	Joseph P. Riley Jr. Park • Charleston, SC	L 1–12	Higginbotam (2–0)	Bialakis (0–1)	None	5,524	7–9	
March 16	#19 Clemson*	Joseph P. Riley Jr. Park • Charleston, SC	L 4–5	Bostic (2–0)	Smith (1–1)	None	4,689	7–10	
March 18	Presbyterian*	Joseph P. Riley Jr. Park • Charleston, SC	W 2–1	Sears (3–1)	Kehner (4–1)	Lavery (4)	324	8–10	
March 19	Presbyterian*	Joseph P. Riley Jr. Park • Charleston, SC	L 6–7	Kyzar (2–0)	P. Watcher (0–1)	Deal (3)	458	8–11	
March 20	Presbyterian*	Joseph P. Riley Jr. Park • Charleston, SC	W 7–2	J. Watcher (3–1)	McLaughlin (0–1)	None	303	9–11	
March 22	at USC Upstate*	Cleveland S. Harley Baseball Park • Spartanburg, SC	L 1–14	Jackson (3–2)	Spence (0–2)	None	57	9–12	
March 25	at VMI	Gray–Minor Stadium • Lexington, VA	W 10–2	Sears (4–1)	Eagle (5–1)	None	272	10–12	1–0
March 26	at VMI	Gray–Minor Stadium • Lexington, VA	L 3–8	Barbery (3–2)	Byelick (0–2)	None	269	10–13	1–1
March 27	at VMI	Gray–Minor Stadium • Lexington, VA	W 4–2	J. Watcher (4–1)	Winder (3–2)	Lavery (5)	204	11–13	2–1
March 29	Charleston Southern*	Joseph P. Riley Jr. Park • Charleston, SC	W 4–3	Lavery (2–0)	Hubbard (0–1)	None	419	12–13	
March 30	at Coastal Carolina*	Charles Watson Stadium • Conway, SC	L 3–4	Hopeck (1–1)	Bialakis (1–1)	Morrison (3)	2,793	12–14	

April
Date	Opponent	Site/stadium	Score	Win	Loss	Save	Attendance	Overall record	SoCon Record
April 1	at Stetson*	Melching Field at Conrad Park • DeLand, FL	L 1–3	Jordan (3–3)	Sears (4–2)	Sheller (7)	776	12–15	
April 2	at Stetson*	Melching Field at Conrad Park • DeLand, FL	L 0–7	Wilson (3–4)	Byelick (0–3)	None	562	12–16	
April 3	at Stetson*	Melching Field at Conrad Park • DeLand, FL	L 5–11	Gilbert (2–0)	J. Watcher (4–2)	None	641	12–17	
April 5	at Charleston Southern*	Buccaneer Ballpark • North Charleston, SC	L 1–18	Hartsell (1–0)	Merritt (0–1)	None	332	12–18	
April 8	UNC Greensboro	Joseph P. Riley Jr. Park • Charleston, SC	L 1–14	Smith (5–0)	Sears (4–3)	None	949	12–19	2–2
April 9	UNC Greensboro	Joseph P. Riley Jr. Park • Charleston, SC	W 7–5	Byelick (1–3)	Hensley (4–1)	None	409	13–19	3–2
April 10	UNC Greensboro	Joseph P. Riley Jr. Park • Charleston, SC	L 4–7	Frisbee (2–2)	J. Watcher (4–3)	Woody (1)	411	13–20	3–3
April 12	at Winthrop*	Winthrop Ballpark • Rock Hill, SC	Postponed						
April 15	at Wofford	Russell C. King Field • Spartanburg, SC	L 5–10	Accetta (1–0)	Lavery (2–1)	None	492	13–21	3–4
April 16	at Wofford	Russell C. King Field • Spartanburg, SC	L 9–10	Stillman (3–1)	Smith (1–2)	None	316	13–22	3–5
April 17	at Wofford	Russell C. King Field • Spartanburg, SC	L 8–10	Acceta (2–0)	Lavery (2–2)	None	283	13–23	3–6
April 19	at Georgia Southern*	J. I. Clements Stadium • Statesboro, GA	L 2–10	Humphris (2–1)	Spence (0–3)	None	660	13–24	
April 20	Georgia Southern*	Joseph P. Riley Jr. Park • Charleston, SC	L 5–7	Brown (4–2)	Lavery (2–3)	Baldwin (1)	420	13–25	
April 22	Western Carolina	Joseph P. Riley Jr. Park • Charleston, SC	W 2–1	Sears (5–3)	Nail (2–5)	Lavery (6)	408	14–25	4–6
April 23	Western Carolina	Joseph P. Riley Jr. Park • Charleston, SC	L 0–11	Sammons (6–2)	Byelick (1–4)	None	517	14–26	4–7
April 24	Western Carolina	Joseph P. Riley Jr. Park • Charleston, SC	W 6–4	J. Watcher (5–3)	Anderson (0–2)	Lavery (7)	517	15–26	5–7
April 26	at Charlotte*	Robert and Mariam Hayes Stadium • Charlotte, NC	L 4–15	Horkey (1–1)	Foulks (0–2)	None	643	15–27	
April 30	Furman	Joseph P. Riley Jr. Park • Charleston, SC	L 6–9	Gaddis (7–2)	Sears (5–4)	Crawford (2)	527	15–28	5–8
April 30	Furman	Joseph P. Riley Jr. Park • Charleston, SC	L 7–12	Greenfield (3–0)	Byelick (1–5)	None	483	15–9	5–9

May
Date	Opponent	Site/stadium	Score	Win	Loss	Save	Attendance	Overall record	SoCon Record
May 1	Furman	Joseph P. Riley Jr. Park • Charleston, SC	L 1–4	Quarles (5–5)	J. Watcher (5–4)	Fondu (2)	507	15–30	5–10
May 5	at Mercer	Claude Smith Field • Macon, GA	L 7–8	Knies (2–1)	Byelick (1–6)	Broom (4)	698	15–31	5–11
May 6	at Mercer	Claude Smith Field • Macon, GA	L 4–11	Askew (4–2)	Sears (5–5)	None	649	15–32	5–12
May 8	at Mercer	Claude Smith Field • Macon, GA	L 9–8	Watcher (6–4)	Coulter (6–3)	Lavery (8)	986	16–32	6–12
May 11	Winthrop*	Joseph P. Riley Jr. Park • Charleston, SC	L 1–7	Green (2–1)	Lavery (2–4)	None	518	16–33	
May 13	Samford	Joseph P. Riley Jr. Park • Charleston, SC	L 6–7	Curry (6–2)	Sears (5–6)	Burns (5)	499	16–34	6–13
May 14	Samford	Joseph P. Riley Jr. Park • Charleston, SC	L 4–5	Greer (3–1)	Lavery (2–5)	Burns (6)	549	16–35	6–14
May 15	Samford	Joseph P. Riley Jr. Park • Charleston, SC							
May 17	at South Carolina*	Carolina Stadium • Columbia, SC							
May 19	at East Tennessee State	Thomas Stadium • Johnson City, TN							
May 20	at East Tennessee State	Thomas Stadium • Johnson City, TN							
May 21	at East Tennessee State	Thomas Stadium • Johnson City, TN							

Post-season

SoCon Tournament
Date	Opponent	Site/stadium	Score	Win	Loss	Save	Attendance	Overall record	SoConT Record
May 25	TBD	Fluor Field at the West End • Greenville, SC							

== 2017 ==
2017 The Citadel Bulldogs baseball
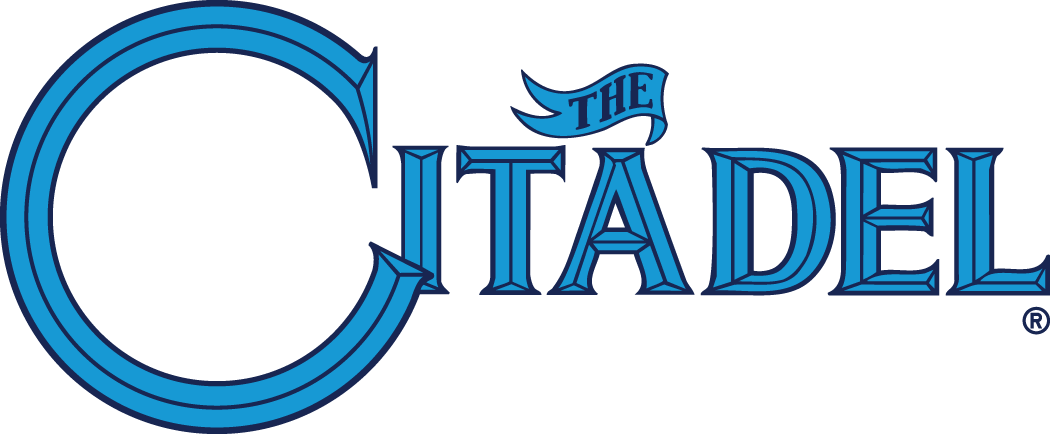
- Conference: Southern Conference
- Record: 8–14 (1–0 SoCon)
- Head coach: Fred Jordan (26th season)
- Assistant coach: David Beckley (16th season)
- Hitting coach: Bo Thompson (1st season)
- Pitching coach: Britt Reames (6th season)
- Home stadium: Joseph P. Riley Jr. Park

2017 Southern Conference baseball standings
	Conf.				Overall
Team	W		L	PCT	W		L	PCT
Mercer ‍†‍‍	17	–	6	.739	39	–	17	.696
Western Carolina ‍‍‍	15	–	8	.652	28	–	28	.500
UNC Greensboro ‍‍‡‍^{y}	14	–	10	.583	36	–	24	.600
Furman ‍‍‍	14	–	10	.583	33	–	28	.541
Wofford ‍‍‍	13	–	11	.542	28	–	30	.483
Samford ‍‍‍	11	–	13	.458	33	–	26	.559
East Tennessee State ‍‍‍	9	–	15	.375	30	–	29	.508
The Citadel ‍‍‍	7	–	17	.292	16	–	35	.314
VMI ‍‍‍	7	–	17	.292	24	–	34	.414
† – Conference champion ‡ – Tournament champion y – Invited to the NCAA tournament Rankings from Collegiate Baseball

=== Roster ===
2017 The Citadel Bulldogs roster
**Pitchers**: 3 – Will Pillsbury – Freshman; 7 – J. P. Sears – Junior; 10 – Jordan Merritt – Sophomore; 11 – Dylan Spence – Sophomore; 12 – Kyle Smith – Sophomore; 16 – Morgan Foulks – Sophomore; 17 – Marlin Morris – Graduate; 19 – Bo Harrell – Sophomore; 21 – Jack Henry Beasley – Freshman; 22 – Will Abbott – Freshman; 25 – Thomas Byelick – Junior; 27 – Alex Bialakis – Sophomore; 29 – Aaron Lesiak – Graduate; 30 – Beau Strickland – Senior; 32 – Jordan Buster – Sophomore; 33 – Austin Todd – Freshman; 35 – Zach Taglieri – Freshman; 36 – Ian Foggo – Freshman; 37 – Ryan Stamler – Sophomore	**Catchers**: 9 – Bryce Leasure – Freshman; 14 – Cole Buffington – Sophomore; 23 – Joe Sabatini – Graduate; **Infielders**: 5 – Barrett Charpia – Senior; 13 – J.D. Davis – Freshman; 15 – Jonathan Sabo – Junior; 18 – William Kinney – Junior; 24 – Ben Peden – Sophomore	**Outfielders**: 1 – Shy Phillips – Junior; 2 – Taylor Cothran – Sophomore; 4 – Clay Martin – Junior; 6 – John Thelan – Freshman; 8 – Jeffery Brown – Freshman

=== Coaches ===
2017 The Citadel Bulldogs baseball coaching staff
- Fred Jordan – Head coach – 26th year
- David Beckley – Associate head coach (recruiting) – 16th year
- Britt Reames – Assistant coach (pitching) – 6th year
- Bo Thompson – Assistant coach – 1st year

=== Schedule ===
Legend
	The Citadel win
	The Citadel loss
	Cancellation
**Bold**	The Citadel team member
*	Non-Conference game

2017 The Citadel Bulldogs baseball game log
Regular season

February
Date	Opponent	Site/stadium	Score	Win	Loss	Save	Attendance	Overall record	SoCon Record
Feb 17	Kansas*	Joseph P. Riley Jr. Park • Charleston, SC (Charleston Crab House Challenge)	**L** 5–7	Rackoski (1–0)	**Sears (0–1)**	Villines (1)	1,215	0–1	
Feb 18	#16 Virginia*	Joseph P. Riley Jr. Park • Charleston, SC (Charleston Crab House Challenge)	**L** 6–10	Sperling (1–0)	**Byelick (0–1)**	None	1,289	0–2	
Feb 19	Liberty*	Joseph P. Riley Jr. Park • Charleston, SC (Charleston Crab House Challenge)	**L** 1–9	Mitchell (1–0)	**Pillsbury (0–1)**	None	1,447	0–3	
Feb 24	Delaware State*	Joseph P. Riley Jr. Park • Charleston, SC	**W** 4–0	**Sears (1–1)**	DeLeon (1–1)	None	228	1–3	
Feb 25	Delaware State*	Joseph P. Riley Jr. Park • Charleston, SC	**W** 6–5	**Sabo (1–0)**	Dill (0–1)	None	735	2–3	
Feb 25	Delaware State*	Joseph P. Riley Jr. Park • Charleston, SC	**L** 1–7	Lawson (1–1)	**Pillsbury (0–2)**	None	685	2–4	
Feb 28	Presbyterian*	Joseph P. Riley Jr. Park • Charleston, SC	**W** 9–8	**Lesiak (1–0)**	Hedrick (0–2)	Sabo (1)		3–4	

March
Date	Opponent	Site/stadium	Score	Win	Loss	Save	Attendance	Overall record	SoCon Record
Mar 3	at College of Charleston*	CofC Baseball Stadium at Patriot's Point • Mount Pleasant, SC	**L** 2–3	Ober (3–0)	**Sabo (1–1)**	Ocker (2)	707	3–5	
Mar 4	College of Charleston*	Joseph P. Riley Jr. Park • Charleston, SC	**L** 1–10	White (1–0)	**Abbott (0–1)**	None	900	3–6	
Mar 5	at College of Charleston*	CofC Baseball Stadium at Patriot's Point • Mount Pleasant, SC	**L** 1–3	Baker (1–0)	**Pillsbury (0–3)**	Ocker (3)	831	3–7	
Mar 7	at #18 South Carolina*	Founders Park • Columbia, SC	**L** 5–12	Lawson (1–0)	**Bialakis (0–1)**	Parke (1)	6,551	3–8	
Mar 10	Stetson*	Joseph P. Riley Jr. Park • Charleston, SC	**W** 5–1	**Sears (2–1)**	Wilson (1–1)	None	524	4–8	
Mar 11	Stetson*	Joseph P. Riley Jr. Park • Charleston, SC	**L** 2–9	Perkins (1–2)	**Abbott (0–2)**	None	700	4–9	
Mar 12	Stetson*	Joseph P. Riley Jr. Park • Charleston, SC	**L** 6–9	Gilbert (2–0)	**Pillsbury (0–4)**	Stark (1)	700	4–10	
Mar 14	Winthrop*	Joseph P. Riley Jr. Park • Charleston, SC	**W** 34–8 (Note: The Citadel set a record for runs scored in a game. It also marked the most runs scored by any NCAA Division I team in a game to this point of the season.)	**Leskiak (2–0)**	Harris (0–4)	None	156	5–10	
Mar 16	Dartmouth*	Joseph P. Riley Jr. Park • Charleston, SC	**L** 2–7	O'Connor (1–0)	**Spence (1–0)**	Burkholder (3)	550	5–11	
Mar 17	Dartmouth*	Joseph P. Riley Jr. Park • Charleston, SC	**W** 5–4	**Sears (3–1)**	Fossand (0–1)	**Sabo (2)**	500	6–11	
Mar 18	Dartmouth*	Joseph P. Riley Jr. Park • Charleston, SC	**W** 8–7^{10}	**Lesiak (3–0)**	Peterson (0–2)	None	500	7–11	
Mar 19	Dartmouth*	Joseph P. Riley Jr. Park • Charleston, SC	**L** 9–10	Danielak (3–0)	**Morris (0–1)**	Bachman (1)	523	7–12	
Mar 21	Georgia Southern*	Joseph P. Riley Jr. Park • Charleston, SC	**L** 3–7	Kelly (1–0)	**Bialakis (0–2)**	None	442	7–13	
Mar 22	at Georgia Southern*	J. I. Clements Stadium • Statesboro, GA	**L** 0–1	Shuman (3–0)	**Taglieri (0–1)**	Hughes (2)	723	7–14	
Mar 24	VMI	Joseph P. Riley Jr. Park • Charleston, SC	**W** 3–0	**Sears (4–1)**	Winder (3–2)	None	505	8–14	1–0
Mar 25	VMI	Joseph P. Riley Jr. Park • Charleston, SC							
Mar 26	VMI	Joseph P. Riley Jr. Park • Charleston, SC							
Mar 28	South Carolina*	Joseph P. Riley Jr. Park • Charleston, SC							
Mar 31	at Western Carolina	Hennon Stadium • Cullowhee, NC							

April
Date	Opponent	Site/stadium	Score	Win	Loss	Save	Attendance	Overall record	SoCon Record
Apr 1	at Western Carolina	Hennon Stadium • Cullowhee, NC							
Apr 2	at Western Carolina	Hennon Stadium • Cullowhee, NC							
Apr 4	at Charleston Southern*	Buccaneer Ballpark • North Charleston, SC							
Apr 5	Coastal Carolina*	Joseph P. Riley Jr. Park • Charleston, SC							
Apr 11	at Winthrop*	Winthrop Ballpark • Rock Hill, SC							
Apr 13	at Samford	Joe Lee Griffin Stadium • Birmingham, AL							
Apr 14	at Samford	Joe Lee Griffin Stadium • Birmingham, AL							
Apr 15	at Samford	Joe Lee Griffin Stadium • Birmingham, AL							
Apr 18	Charleston Southern*	Joseph P. Riley Jr. Park • Charleston, SC							
Apr 21	Mercer	Joseph P. Riley Jr. Park • Charleston, SC							
Apr 22	Mercer	Joseph P. Riley Jr. Park • Charleston, SC							
Apr 23	Mercer	Joseph P. Riley Jr. Park • Charleston, SC							
Apr 28	at Furman	Latham Baseball Stadium • Greenville, SC							
Apr 29	at Furman	Latham Baseball Stadium • Greenville, SC							
Apr 30	at Furman	Latham Baseball Stadium • Greenville, SC							

May
Date	Opponent	Site/stadium	Score	Win	Loss	Save	Attendance	Overall record	SoCon Record
May 5	East Tennessee State	Joseph P. Riley Jr. Park • Charleston, SC							
May 6	East Tennessee State	Joseph P. Riley Jr. Park • Charleston, SC							
May 7	East Tennessee State	Joseph P. Riley Jr. Park • Charleston, SC							
May 12	at UNC Greensboro	UNCG Baseball Stadium • Greensboro, NC							
May 13	at UNC Greensboro	UNCG Baseball Stadium • Greensboro, NC							
May 14	at UNC Greensboro	UNCG Baseball Stadium • Greensboro, NC							
May 18	Wofford	Joseph P. Riley Jr. Park • Charleston, SC							
May 19	Wofford	Joseph P. Riley Jr. Park • Charleston, SC							
May 20	Wofford	Joseph P. Riley Jr. Park • Charleston, SC							

Post-season

SoCon Tournament
Date	Opponent	Site/stadium	Score	Win	Loss	Save	Attendance	Overall record	SoConT Record
May 24	TBD	Fluor Field at the West End • Greenville, SC							

== 2018 ==
2018 The Citadel Bulldogs baseball
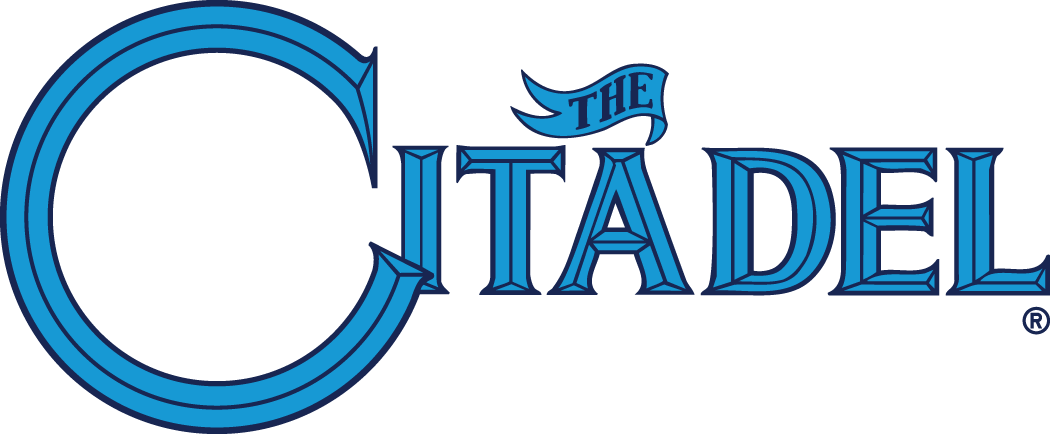
- Conference: Southern Conference
- Record: 19–34 (8–16 SoCon)
- Head coach: Tony Skole (1st season)
- Hitting coach: Aaron Gershenfeld (1st season)
- Pitching coach: Blake Cooper (1st season)
- Home stadium: Joseph P. Riley Jr. Park

2018 Southern Conference baseball standings
	Conf.				Overall
Team	W		L	PCT	W		L	PCT
UNC Greensboro ‍‍‍	18	–	3	.857	37	–	13	.740
Samford ‍‍‍	16	–	8	.667	32	–	24	.571
Wofford ‍‍‍	15	–	9	.625	35	–	21	.625
VMI ‍‍‍	12	–	12	.500	26	–	25	.510
Mercer ‍‍‍	11	–	13	.458	35	–	20	.636
East Tennessee State ‍‍‍	11	–	13	.458	27	–	23	.540
Furman ‍‍‍	9	–	12	.429	24	–	26	.480
The Citadel ‍‍‍	8	–	16	.333	19	–	33	.365
Western Carolina ‍‍‍	5	–	19	.208	7	–	45	.135
‡ – Tournament champion As of May 19, 2018; Rankings from Collegiate Baseball

=== Personnel ===
==== Roster ====
2018 The Citadel Bulldogs roster
**Pitchers**: 3 - Jack Henry - Sophomore; 6 - Hunter Barbee - Freshman; 10 - Jordan Merritt - Junior; 12 - Kyle Smith - Senior; 16 - Morgan Foulks - Junior; 17 - Shane Connolly - Freshman; 19 - Dylan Spence - Junior; 21 - Will Pillsbury - Sophomore; 25 - Thomas Byelick - Senior; 27 - Alex Bialikis - Junior; 29 - Bo Harrell - Junior; 32 - Jordan Buster - Junior; 33 - Devin Beckley - Freshman; 34 - Gunnar Finneseth - Freshman; 35 - Zach Taglieri - Sophomore; 36 - Ian Foggo - (redshirt) Freshman; 37 - Ryan Stamler - Senior; - Austin Blakely - Freshman; - Trenton Jenkins - Freshman; - Jack Ockerman - Freshman	**Catchers**: 9 - Bryce Leasure - Sophomore; 14 - Cole Buffington - Junior; 28 - Aidan Massey - Freshman; 39 - Matt Cline - Freshman; **Infielders**: 0 - Brooks O'Brien - Freshman; 13 - J. D. Davis - Sophomore; 15 - Jonathan Sabo - Senior; 18 - William Kinney - Senior; 20 - Michael Ray - Freshman; 22 - Tilo Skole - Freshman; 23 - Adam Colon - Freshman; 24 - Ben Peden - Junior	**Outfielders**: 1 - Ryan McCarthy - Freshman; 2 - Taylor Cothran - Junior; 4 - Clay Martin - Senior; 5 - Cameron Jensen - Sophomore; 8 - Jeffery Brown - Sophomore; 11 - Andrew Judkins - Freshman; - John Theland - Sophomore

==== Coaches ====
2018 The Citadel Bulldogs baseball coaching staff
- Tony Skole – Head coach – 1st year
- Aaron Gershenfeld – Assistant coach (hitting/recruiting) – 1st year
- Blake Cooper – Assistant coach (pitching) – 1st year

=== Schedule ===
Legend
	The Citadel win
	The Citadel loss
	Cancellation
**Bold**	The Citadel team member
*	Non-Conference game

2018 The Citadel Bulldogs baseball game log
Regular season

February
Date	Opponent	Site/stadium	Score	Win	Loss	Save	Attendance	Overall record	SoCon Record
Feb 16	George Mason*	Joseph P. Riley Jr. Park • Charleston, SC (Charleston Crab House Challenge)	**W** 3–0	**Buster (1–0)**	DiCesare (0–1)	None	512	1–0	
Feb 17	#21 Louisville*	Joseph P. Riley Jr. Park • Charleston, SC (Charleston Crab House Challenge)	**L** 3–8	Bennett (1–0)	**Pillsbury (0–1)**	None	809	1–1	
Feb 18	Richmond*	Joseph P. Riley Jr. Park • Charleston, SC (Charleston Crab House Challenge)	**L** 3–13	Lowe (1–0)	**Byelick (0–1)**	None	508	1–2	
Feb 23	La Salle*	Joseph P. Riley Jr. Park • Charleston, SC	**W** 7–5^{15}	**Bialakis (1–0)**	Pruitt (0–1)	None	154	2–2	
Feb 24	La Salle*	Joseph P. Riley Jr. Park • Charleston, SC	**W** 8–7	**Smith (1–0)**	Jenkins (0–1)	**Sabo (1)**	208	3–2	
Feb 25	La Salle*	Joseph P. Riley Jr. Park • Charleston, SC	**L** 4–6	Anthony (1–0)	**Byelick (0–2)**	Hinchliffe (1)	343	3–3	
Feb 27	Georgia Southern*	Joseph P. Riley Jr. Park • Charleston, SC	**L** 3–9	Cowart (1–0)	**Buster (1–1)**	None	133	3–4	

March
Date	Opponent	Site/stadium	Score	Win	Loss	Save	Attendance	Overall record	SoCon Record
Mar 2	Charleston Southern*	Joseph P. Riley Jr. Park • Charleston, SC	**L** 3–6	Constantakos (2–1)	**Spence (0–1)**	Smith (3)	303	3–5	
Mar 3	at Charleston Southern*	Buccaneer Ballpark • North Charleston, SC	**W** 8–1	**Merritt (1–0)**	Stoudemire (0–3)	None	421	4–5	
Mar 4	Charleston Southern*	Joseph P. Riley Jr. Park • Charleston, SC	**W** 6–2	**Bialakis (2–0)**	Weekley (1–2)	None	317	5–5	
Mar 6	Georgia*	Joseph P. Riley Jr. Park • Charleston, SC	**L** 4–9	Smith (2–1)	**Beckley (0–1)**	None	221	5–6	
Mar 7	at Winthrop*	Winthrop Ballpark • Rock Hill, SC	**L** 1–8	Willcutt (1–1)	**Connolly (0–1)**	None	144	5–7	
Mar 9	Connecticut*	Joseph P. Riley Jr. Park • Charleston, SC	**W** 4–2	**Buster (2–1)**	Cate (1–3)	**Sabo (2)**	134	6–7	
Mar 10	Connecticut*	Joseph P. Riley Jr. Park • Charleston, SC	**L** 3–17	Feole (2–0)	**Merritt (1–1)**	None	272	6–8	
Mar 11	Connecticut*	Joseph P. Riley Jr. Park • Charleston, SC	**W** 4–2	**Pillsbury (1–1)**	Holmes (0–1)	**Sabo (3)**	229	7–8	
Mar 12	Connecticut*	Joseph P. Riley Jr. Park • Charleston, SC	Cancelled						
Mar 14	Richmond*	Joseph P. Riley Jr. Park • Charleston, SC	**W** 5–2	**K. Smith (2–0)**	Roy (0–2)	**Buster (1)**	104	8–8	
Mar 16	Indiana State*	Joseph P. Riley Jr. Park • Charleston, SC	**L** 3–10	Ward (3–1)	**Spence (0–2)**	None	196	8–9	
Mar 17	Indiana State*	Joseph P. Riley Jr. Park • Charleston, SC	**L** 3–7	Polley (4–1)	**Merritt (1–2)**	None	209	8–10	
Mar 18	Indiana State*	Joseph P. Riley Jr. Park • Charleston, SC	**L** 2–5	Weaver (2–1)	**Bialakis (2–1)**	Larrison (5)	232	8–11	
Mar 20	at South Carolina*	Founders Park • Columbia, SC	**W** 4–3	**Buster (3–1)**	Coyne (1–1)	None	6,307	9–11	
Mar 23	Western Carolina	Joseph P. Riley Jr. Park • Charleston, SC	**W** 5–1	**Spence (1–2)**	Walter (0–3)	None	179	10–11	1–0
Mar 24	Western Carolina	Joseph P. Riley Jr. Park • Charleston, SC	**L** 5–8	Baker (1–2)	**Bialakis (2–2)**	Franklin (1)		10–12	1–1
Mar 25	Western Carolina	Joseph P. Riley Jr. Park • Charleston, SC	**W** 9–3	**Merritt (2–2)**	Purus (1–5)	None	446	11–12	2–1
Mar 30	at VMI	Gray–Minor Stadium • Lexington, VA	**W** 5–0	**Spence (2–2)**	Winder (1–4)	None	188	12–12	3–1
Mar 31	at VMI	Gray–Minor Stadium • Lexington, VA	**L** 3–12	Kent (3–3)	**Bialakis (2–3)**	None	323	12–13	3–2

April
Date	Opponent	Site/stadium	Score	Win	Loss	Save	Attendance	Overall record	SoCon Record
Apr 1	at VMI	Gray–Minor Stadium • Lexington, VA	**L** 4–12	Staats (3–1)	**Merritt (2–3)**	Eagle (4)	239	12–14	3–3
Apr 3	at Georgia Southern*	J.I. Clements Stadium • Statesboro, GA	**L** 7–12	Whitney (3–1)	**Merritt (2–4)**	None	442	12–15	
Apr 4	Winthrop*	Joseph P. Riley Jr. Park • Charleston, SC	**L** 6–12	Rendon (4–2)	**Byelick (0–3)**	None	307	12–16	
Apr 6	Samford	Joseph P. Riley Jr. Park • Charleston, SC	**L** 4–9	Shelton (1–2)	**Spence (2–3)**	None	208	12–17	3–4
Apr 7	Samford	Joseph P. Riley Jr. Park • Charleston, SC	**L** 0–7	Strickland (5–0)	**Byelick (0–4)**	None	211	12–18	3–5
Apr 8	Samford	Joseph P. Riley Jr. Park • Charleston, SC	**L** 2–15^{7}	Jones (3–4)	**Bialakis (2–4)**	None	179	12–19	3–6
Apr 10	South Carolina*	Joseph P. Riley Jr. Park • Charleston, SC	**L** 1–12	Miodzinski (1–3)	**Sabo (0–1)**	None	1,537	12–20	
Apr 11	College of Charleston*	Joseph P. Riley Jr. Park • Charleston, SC	Cancelled						
Apr 13	Towson*	Joseph P. Riley Jr. Park • Charleston, SC	**W** 11–3	**Spence (3–3)**	Plagge (1–3)	**Bialakis (1)**	128	13–20	
Apr 14	Towson*	Joseph P. Riley Jr. Park • Charleston, SC	**L** 0–6	Marriggi (2–4)	**Byelick (0–5)**	None		13–21	
Apr 14	Towson*	Joseph P. Riley Jr. Park • Charleston, SC	**W** 4–3	**Sabo (1–1)**	Adams (3–3)	**Buster (2)**	259	14–21	
Apr 17	at Charleston Southern*	Buccaneer Field • North Charleston, SC	**L** 6–7	Stoudamire (1–5)	**Buster (3–2)**		163	14–22	
Apr 20	at Wofford	Russell C. King Field • Spartanburg, SC	**L** 1–5	Scott (6–3)	**Spence (3–4)**	None	379	14–23	3–7
Apr 21	at Wofford	Russell C. King Field • Spartanburg, SC	**L** 5–8	Higginbotham (5–2)	**Byelick (0–6)**	Garcia (5)	538	14–24	3–8
Apr 22	at Wofford	Russell C. King Field • Spartanburg, SC	**L** 5–6	Hershman (3–4)	**Buster (3–3)**	None	304	14–25	3–9
Apr 28	Furman	Joseph P. Riley Jr. Park • Charleston, SC	**L** 5–11^{10}	Schuermann (3–6)	**Taglier (0–1)**	None		14–26	3–10
Apr 28	Furman	Joseph P. Riley Jr. Park • Charleston, SC	**W** 6–1	**Byelick (1–6)**	Bertrand (4–2)	None	477	15–26	4–10
Apr 29	Furman	Joseph P. Riley Jr. Park • Charleston, SC	**L** 1–6	Beatson (2–2)	**Sabo (1–2)**	None	447	15–27	4–11

May
Date	Opponent	Site/stadium	Score	Win	Loss	Save	Attendance	Overall record	SoCon Record
May 3	at East Tennessee State	Thomas Stadium • Johnson City, TN	**W** 6–5^{10}	**Buster (4–3)**	Korzybski (2–3)	None	474	16–27	5–11
May 4	at East Tennessee State	Thomas Stadium • Johnson City, TN	**W** 13–6	**Byelick (2–6)**	Simpler (5–5)	**Bialakis (2)**	743	17–27	6–11
May 6	at East Tennessee State	Thomas Stadium • Johnson City, TN	**L** 5–11	Koesters (3–2)	**Sabo (1–3)**	Sweeney (1)	411	17–28	6–12
May 8	at College of Charleston*	CofC Baseball Stadium at Patriots Point • Mount Pleasant, SC	**L** 6–10	Love (7–0)	**Stamler (0–1)**	Ocker (9)	833	17–29	
May 11	UNC Greensboro	Joseph P. Riley Jr. Park • Charleston, SC	**L** 5–14	Frisbee (10–0)	**Merritt (2–5)**	None	290	17–30	6–13
May 12	UNC Greensboro	Joseph P. Riley Jr. Park • Charleston, SC	**L** 3–4	Maynard (5–3)	**Bialakis (2–5)**	Wantz (9)	262	17–31	6–14
May 13	UNC Greensboro	Joseph P. Riley Jr. Park • Charleston, SC	**L** 3–14	Lewis (6–0)	**Spence (3–5)**	Welch (3)	177	17–32	6–15
May 15	College of Charleston*	Joseph P. Riley Jr. Park • Charleston, SC	Cancelled						
May 17	at Mercer	Claude Smith Field • Macon, GA	**L** 3–6	Broom (10–2)	**Foggo (0–1)**	None	218	17–33	6–16
May 17	at Mercer	Claude Smith Field • Macon, GA	**W** 5–4	**Byelick (3–6)**	Burks (5–5)	**Buster (3)**	218	18–33	7–16
May 19	at Mercer	Claude Smith Field • Macon, GA	**W** 7–5	**Bialakis (3–5)**	Broom (10–3)	**Sabo (4)**	469	19–33	8–16

Post-season

SoCon Tournament
Date	Opponent	Rank	Site/stadium	Score	Win	Loss	Save	Attendance	Overall record	SoConT Record
May 22	(9) Western Carolina	(8)	Fluor Field at the West End • Greenville, SC	**L** 5–6	Baker (3–6)	**Buster (4–4)**	Franklin (3)	265	19–34	0–1

== 2019 ==
2019 The Citadel Bulldogs baseball
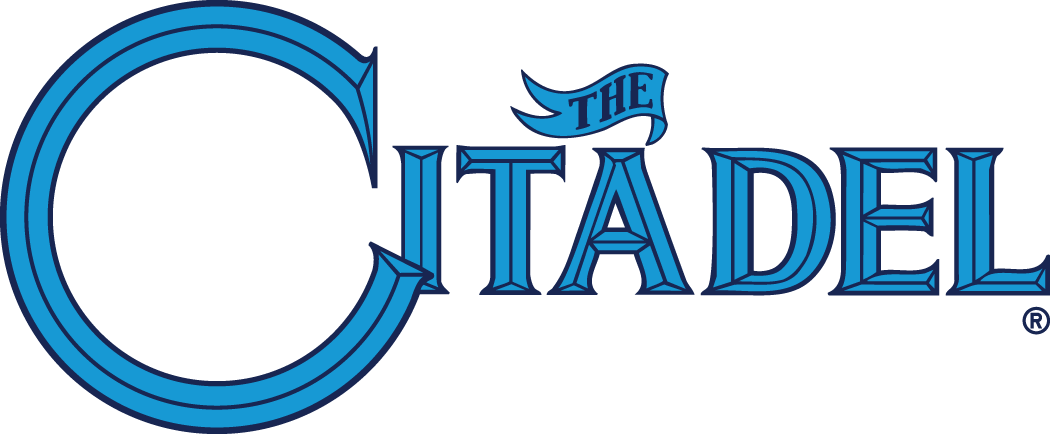
- Conference: Southern Conference
- Record: 12–43 (5–19 SoCon)
- Head coach: Tony Skole (2nd season)
- Hitting coach: Aaron Gershenfeld (2nd season)
- Pitching coach: Blake Cooper (2nd season)
- Home stadium: Joseph P. Riley Jr. Park

2019 Southern Conference baseball standings
	Conf.				Overall
Team	W		L	PCT	W		L	PCT
Samford ‍†‍‍	19	–	5	.792	41	–	19	.683
Wofford ‍‍‍	14	–	9	.609	36	–	25	.590
UNC Greensboro ‍‍‍	14	–	10	.583	34	–	20	.630
Mercer ‍‍‡‍^{y}	14	–	10	.583	35	–	29	.547
Furman ‍‍‍	13	–	11	.542	26	–	31	.456
East Tennessee State ‍‍‍	11	–	12	.478	34	–	21	.618
VMI ‍‍‍	9	–	15	.375	17	–	41	.293
Western Carolina ‍‍‍	8	–	16	.333	21	–	32	.396
The Citadel ‍‍‍	5	–	19	.208	12	–	43	.218
† – Conference champion ‡ – Tournament champion y – Invited to the NCAA tournament As of June 5, 2019; Rankings from D1Baseball

=== Personnel ===
==== Roster ====
2019 The Citadel Bulldogs baseball roster
**Pitchers**: 3 - Jack Henry Beasley - Junior; 6 - Hunter Barbee - Sophomore; 10 - Jordan Merritt - Senior; 14 - Cole Buffington - Senior; 15 - Cameron Reeves - Freshman; 16 - Morgan Foulks - Senior; 17 - Shane Connolly - Sophomore; 18 - Lathan Todd - Freshman; 19 - Dylan Spence - Senior; 21 - Will Pillsbury - Junior; 27 - Alex Bialakis - Senior; 32 - Jordan Buster - Senior; 33 - Devin Beckley - Sophomore; 35 - Zach Taglieri - Junior; 36 - Ian Foggo – (redshirt) Sophomore; 40 - Trenton Jenkins - Sophomore; 42 - Austin Blakely – (redshirt) Freshman; 44 - Jordan Flanders - Freshman	**Catchers**: 9 - Bryce Leasure - Junior; 30 - Weidner Wilfong - Freshman; **Infielders**: 0 - Brooks O'Brien - Sophomore; 1 - Tyler Corbitt - Freshman; 4 - Will Bastian - Freshman; 13 - J. D. Davis - Junior; 20 - Michael Ray - Sophomore; 22 - Tilo Skole - Sophomore; 23 - Adam Colon - Sophomore; 24 - Ben Peden - Senior	**Outfielders**: 2 - Wes Lane; 5 - Cam Jensen - Junior; 8 - Jeffery Brown - Junior; 11 - Andrew Judkins - Sophomore; 12 - Ryan McCarthy - Sophomore; 25 - Ches Goodman - Freshman; 28 - Lane Botkin – (redshirt) Freshman; 34 - Cole Simpson - Freshman; 37 - Tyler Estridge - Freshman

==== Coaches ====
2019 The Citadel Bulldogs baseball coaching staff
- Tony Skole – Head coach – 2nd year
- Aaron Gershenfeld – Assistant coach (hitting/recruiting) – 2nd year
- Blake Cooper – Assistant coach (pitching) – 2nd year

=== Schedule ===
Legend
	The Citadel win
	The Citadel loss
	Cancellation
**Bold**	The Citadel team member
*	Non-Conference game

2019 The Citadel Bulldogs baseball game log
Regular season

February
Date	Opponent	Site/stadium	Score	Win	Loss	Save	Attendance	Overall record	SoCon Record
Feb 15	Delaware State*	Joseph P. Riley Jr. Park • Charleston, SC	**L** 1–3	Lawson (1–0)	**Merritt (0–1)**	Carrow (1)	406	0–1	
Feb 16	Delaware State*	Joseph P. Riley Jr. Park • Charleston, SC	**W** 5–0	**Connolly (1–0)**	Mcgrath (0–1)	None	387	1–1	
Feb 17	Delaware State*	Joseph P. Riley Jr. Park • Charleston, SC	**W** 9–3	**Spence (1–0)**	Rivera (0–1)	None	309	2–1	
Feb 22	No. 17 Michigan*	Joseph P. Riley Jr. Park • Charleston, SC	**L** 0–2	Henry (2–0)	**Merritt (0–2)**	None	358	2–2	
Feb 23	No. 17 Michigan*	Joseph P. Riley Jr. Park • Charleston, SC	**L** 1–9	Kauffmann (2–0)	**Connolly (1–1)**	None	622	2–3	
Feb 24	No. 17 Michigan*	Joseph P. Riley Jr. Park • Charleston, SC	**L** 3–6	Weiss (1–0)	**Spence (1–1)**	None	278	2–4	
Feb 27	Kent State*	Joseph P. Riley Jr. Park • Charleston, SC	**L** 2–11	Deats (1–0)	**Blakely (0–1)**	None	147	2–5	

March
Date	Opponent	Site/stadium	Score	Win	Loss	Save	Attendance	Overall record	SoCon Record
Mar 1	North Alabama*	Joseph P. Riley Jr. Park • Charleston, SC	**W** 6–3	**Merritt (1–2)**	Best (0–3)	None	167	3–5	
Mar 2	North Alabama*	Joseph P. Riley Jr. Park • Charleston, SC	**W** 7–4	**Connolly (2–1)**	Chamblin (0–2)	**Buster (1)**	282	4–5	
Mar 3	North Alabama*	Joseph P. Riley Jr. Park • Charleston, SC	**W** 8–3	**Spence (2–1)**	Laws (1–1)	None	243	5–5	
Mar 5	at No. 24 South Carolina*	Founders Park • Columbia, SC	**L** 0–9	Shook (2–0)	**Reeves (0–1)**	None	5,807	5–6	
Mar 6	Winthrop*	Joseph P. Riley Jr. Park • Charleston, SC	**L** 1–4	Whitten (1–0)	**Flanders (0–1)**	Groves (2)	107	5–7	
Mar 8	Charleston Southern*	Joseph P. Riley Jr. Park • Charleston, SC	**W** 10–1	**Merritt (2–2)**	Weekley (0–3)	None	318	6–7	
Mar 9	at Charleston Southern*	Buccaneer Ballpark • North Charleston, SC	**L** 5–10	Bennett (1–2)	**Pillsbury (0–1)**	None	815	6–8	
Mar 10	Charleston Southern*	Joseph P. Riley Jr. Park • Charleston, SC	**W** 4–3	**Pillsbury (1–1)**	Stoudemire (1–3)	None	311	7–8	
Mar 12	No. 22 South Carolina*	Joseph P. Riley Jr. Park • Charleston, SC	**L** 9–10	Lloyd (2–0)	**Flanders (0–2)**	Hinson (1)	3,923	7–9	
Mar 16	at Indiana State*	Bob Warn Field at Sycamore Stadium • Terre Haute, IN	**L** 1–5	Polley (4–0)	**Connolly (2–2)**	None		7–10	
Mar 16	at Indiana State*	Bob Warn Field at Sycamore Stadium • Terre Haute, IN	**L** 2–4	Liberatore (4–0)	**Merritt (2–3)**	None	789	7–11	
Mar 17	at Indiana State*	Bob Warn Field at Sycamore Stadium • Terre Haute, IN	**L** 0–8	Whitbread (3–0)	**Spence (2–2)**	None	345	7–12	
Mar 19	Georgia Southern*	Joseph P. Riley Jr. Park • Charleston, SC	**L** 2–6	Owens (2–0)	**Flanders (0–3)**	None	208	7–13	
Mar 20	at Winthrop*	Winthrop Ballpark • Rock Hill, SC	**L** 1–8	Petta (1–0)	**Reeves (0–2)**	None	607	7–14	
Mar 22	VMI	Joseph P. Riley Jr. Park • Charleston, SC	**L** 5–9	Meders (2–1)	**Merritt (2–4)**	None	291	7–15	0–1
Mar 23	VMI	Joseph P. Riley Jr. Park • Charleston, SC	**W** 1–0	**Connolly (3–2)**	Jewell (0–3)	None	492	8–15	1–1
Mar 24	VMI	Joseph P. Riley Jr. Park • Charleston, SC	**W** 3–2^{10}	**Foggo (1–0)**	Johnston (0–2)	None	354	9–15	2–1
Mar 26	College of Charleston*	Joseph P. Riley Jr. Park • Charleston, SC	**L** 1–11	Williams (1–2)	**Bialakis (0–1)**	None	657	9–16	
Mar 29	at Furman	Latham Baseball Stadium • Greenville, SC	**L** 4–5	Beatson (3–1)	**Bialakis (0–2)**	None	616	9–17	2–2
Mar 30	at Furman	Latham Baseball Stadium • Greenville, SC	**L** 6–20	Hughes (3–1)	**Connolly (3–3)**	None	827	9–18	2–3
Mar 31	at Furman	Latham Baseball Stadium • Greenville, SC	**L** 2–7	Dunlavey (2–5)	**Spence (2–2)**	Beatson (2)	776	9–19	2–4

April
Date	Opponent	Site/stadium	Score	Win	Loss	Save	Attendance	Overall record	SoCon Record
Apr 3	at Charleston Southern*	Buccaneer Field • North Charleston, SC	**L** 5–10	Hiott (3–0)	**Buster (0–1)**	None	586	9–20	
Apr 5	Mercer	Joseph P. Riley Jr. Park • Charleston, SC	**W** 8–5	**Merritt (3–4)**	Healy (2–3)	**Spence (1)**	224	10–20	3–4
Apr 6	Mercer	Joseph P. Riley Jr. Park • Charleston, SC	**L** 3–10	Gispon-Long (3–3)	**Bialakis (0–3)**	None	265	10–21	3–5
Apr 7	Mercer	Joseph P. Riley Jr. Park • Charleston, SC	**L** 0–10^{8}	**Hall (4–3)**	**Spence (2–4)**	None	173	10–22	3–6
Apr 9	College of Charleston*	Joseph P. Riley Jr. Park • Charleston, SC	Suspended in the top of the sixth, The Citadel leading 3–2						
Apr 12	at Samford	Joe Lee Griffin Stadium • Birmingham, AL	**L** 4–8	Cupo (3–0)	**Spence (2–5)**	None	364	10–23	3–7
Apr 13	at Samford	Joe Lee Griffin Stadium • Birmingham, AL	**L** 2–6	Creger (2–0)	**Bialakis (0–4)**	None	319	10–24	3–8
Apr 14	at Samford	Joe Lee Griffin Stadium • Birmingham, AL	**L** 3–10	Hester (4–3)	**Spence (2–6)**	None	329	10–25	3–9
Apr 18	at South Florida*	USF Baseball Stadium • Tampa, FL	**L** 1–9	Stuart (2–2)	**Merritt (3–5)**	None	763	10–26	
Apr 20	at South Florida*	USF Baseball Stadium • Tampa, FL	**L** 2–7	Sullivan (3–3)	**Connolly (3–4)**	None		10–27	
Apr 20	at South Florida*	USF Baseball Stadium • Tampa, FL	**L** 9–12	Cruz (2–1)	**Flanders (0–4)**	None	821	10–28	
Apr 23	at Georgia Southern*	J.I. Clements Stadium • Statesboro, GA	**L** 3–5	Jones (2–1)	**Spence (2–7)**	Harris (6)	823	10–29	
Apr 26	at UNC Greensboro	UNCG Baseball Stadium • Greensboro, NC	**L** 5–6	Jackson (4–1)	**Goodman (0–2)**	Sykes (6)		10–30	3–10
Apr 27	at UNC Greensboro	UNCG Baseball Stadium • Greensboro, NC	**L** 10–16	Stephens (2–2)	**Connolly (3–5)**	Sykes (7)	508	10–31	3–11
Apr 28	at UNC Greensboro	UNCG Baseball Stadium • Greensboro, NC	**L** 3–8	Mayhew (1–0)	**Taglieri (0–1)**	Triplett (1)	404	10–32	3–12
Apr 30	vs Georgia*	SRP Park • North Augusta, SC	**L** 0–9	Moody (1–0)	**Bialakis (0–5)**	None	3,602	10–33	

May
Date	Opponent	Site/stadium	Score	Win	Loss	Save	Attendance	Overall record	SoCon Record
May 3	Wofford	Joseph P. Riley Jr. Park • Charleston, SC	**L** 7–17	Maniscalco (3–1)	**Merritt (3–6)**	None	211	10–34	3–13
May 4	Wofford	Joseph P. Riley Jr. Park • Charleston, SC	**L** 1–8	Heinecke (9–0)	**Connolly (3–6)**	None	252	10–35	3–14
May 5	Wofford	Joseph P. Riley Jr. Park • Charleston, SC	**L** 3–4	Pandya (3–2)	**Foulks (0–1)**	None	205	10–36	3–15
May 8	at Clemson*	Doug Kingsmore Stadium • Clemson, SC	**L** 3–17	Lindley (2–0)	**Bialakis (0–6)**	None	4,890	10–37	
May 10	East Tennessee State	Joseph P. Riley Jr. Park • Charleston, SC	**L** 0–4	Kaczor (6–1)	**Merritt (3–7)**	None	177	10–38	3–16
May 11	East Tennessee State	Joseph P. Riley Jr. Park • Charleston, SC	**L** 1–3^{10}	Tate (3–0)	**Goodman (0–2)**	None	256	10–39	3–17
May 12	East Tennessee State	Joseph P. Riley Jr. Park • Charleston, SC	**L** 0–9^{8}	Seeney (6–3)	**Flanders (0–5)**	None	195	10–40	3–18
May 14	at College of Charleston*	CofC Baseball Stadium at Patriots Point • Mount Pleasant, SC	**L** 8–9	Fields (2–0)	**Taglieri (0–2)**	Price (1)	616	10–41	
May 16	at Western Carolina	Hennon Stadium • Cullowhee, NC	**L** 3–4	Purus (4–4)	**Connolly (3–7)**	Corn (4)	425	10–42	3–19
May 17	at Western Carolina	Hennon Stadium • Cullowhee, NC	**W** 5–2	**Reeves (1–2)**	Snyder (2–3)	None	548	11–42	4–19
May 18	at Western Carolina	Hennon Stadium • Cullowhee, NC	**W** 3–1	**Todd (1–0)**	Mitschele (0–3)	**Goodman (1)**	560	12–42	5–19

Post-season

SoCon Tournament
Date	Opponent	Site/stadium	Score	Win	Loss	Save	Attendance	Overall record	SoConT Record
May 21	Western Carolina	Fluor Field at the West End • Greenville, SC	**L** 3–7	Purus (5–4)	**Merritt (3–8)**	None	860	13–43	0–1
