= CSU Ballpark =

Baseball venue in Charleston, South Carolina

- Interactive map of CSU Ballpark
- Full name: Nielsen Field @ CSU Ballpark
- Address: 9200 University Blvd; Charleston, South Carolina; United States
- Coordinates: 32.983152°N 80.066997°W
- Owner: Charleston Southern University
- Operator: Charleston Southern University
- Capacity: 1,000
- Surface: Natural grass
- Record attendance: 612 (Presbyterian, April 19th, 2013)
- Field size: Left field: 330 feet (100 m); Left center field: 385 feet (117 m); Center field: 400 feet (120 m); Right center field: 385 feet (117 m); Right field: 330 feet (100 m)

Construction
- Opened: February 10th, 2001
- Renovated: 2013

Tenant
- Charleston Southern Buccaneers baseball (NCAA DI Big South)

Website
- Nielsen Field

CSU Ballpark is a baseball venue located in North Charleston, South Carolina, United States. It is home to the Charleston Southern Buccaneers college baseball team of the Division I Big South Conference. It has a capacity of 1,000 spectators.

Recent renovations of the facility have improved the backstop, dugouts, and fencing. Also, new bleacher seating has increased capacity, and limited chairback seating has been added for season ticket holders. During the 2013 season, stadium lighting was installed at the facility. The project was estimated to cost $350,000, with the city of North Charleston making a sizeable contribution in return for access to the facility for events. The first night game at the facility was scheduled for April 19, 2013, against Big South rival Presbyterian.

== See also ==
- List of NCAA Division I baseball venues
