= List of The Citadel Bulldogs baseball seasons =

This is a list of The Citadel baseball seasons. The Citadel Bulldogs baseball team represents The Citadel, The Military College of South Carolina and is a member of the Southern Conference of the NCAA Division I. The team played its first season in 1899, but complete records were not kept until after the ACC split prior to the 1954 season. Results listed for seasons prior to that are those compiled by the school from historical accounts and represent the most current information The Citadel has. No team was fielded from 1932 to 1934 or from 1941 to 1946. In addition, the 1917 team was disbanded due to the outbreak of World War I.

The Bulldogs are nine time Southern Conference baseball tournament champions, thirteen time regular season conference champions, and have participated in postseason play fourteen times through the 2026 season. In 1990, the team won the Atlantic Regional in Miami, FL and advanced to the 1990 College World Series, becoming the first and (through 2026) only military school to ever play in Omaha.

== Season Results ==
| National champions | College World Series berth | NCAA tournament berth | Conference Tournament champions | Conference/Division Regular season Champions |

| Season | Head coach | Conference | Season results | | | | | | | | | Tournament Results | | Final Poll (Note: Collegiate Baseball began team rankings in 1959.) |
| Season | Head coach | Conference | Overall | | | | Conference | | | | | Conference | Postseason (Note: Postseason play involving the NCAA Division I Baseball Championship began in 1947.) | CB |
| Season | Head coach | Conference | Wins | Losses | Ties | % | Wins | Losses | Ties | % | Finish (Members) | Conference | Postseason | CB |
|---|---|---|---|---|---|---|---|---|---|---|---|---|---|---|
The Citadel Bulldogs
| 1899 | Not available | Independent | — | — | — | — | — | — | — | — | — | — | — | — |
| 1900 | Not available | Independent | 3 | 5 | 0 | .375 | — | — | — | — | — | — | — | — |
| 1901 | Not available | Independent | — | — | — | — | — | — | — | — | — | — | — | — |
| 1902 | Not available | Independent | — | — | — | — | — | — | — | — | — | — | — | — |
| 1903 | Not available | Independent | — | — | — | — | — | — | — | — | — | — | — | — |
| 1904 | Not available | Independent | — | — | — | — | — | — | — | — | — | — | — | — |
| 1905 | Mr. Gunner | Independent | — | — | — | — | — | — | — | — | — | — | — | — |
| 1906 | Not available | Independent | — | — | — | — | — | — | — | — | — | — | — | — |
| 1907 | J. W. Moore | Independent | — | — | — | — | — | — | — | — | — | — | — | — |
| 1908 | O. B. "Rip" Simpson | Independent | 5 | 1 | 0 | .833 | — | — | — | — | — | — | — | — |
| 1909 | "Babe" Brothers | Independent | — | — | — | — | — | — | — | — | — | — | — | — |
| 1910 | George A. Schmick | Independent | 4 | 6 | 0 | .400 | — | — | — | — | — | — | — | — |
| 1911 | "Barney" Legge | Independent | 2 | 5 | 1 | .286 | — | — | — | — | — | — | — | — |
| 1912 | Ralph McLaurin | Independent | — | — | — | — | — | — | — | — | — | — | — | — |
| 1913 | Not available | Independent | 5 | 3 | 0 | .625 | — | — | — | — | — | — | — | — |
| 1914 | George C. Rogers | Independent | 7 | 5 | 0 | .583 | — | — | — | — | — | — | — | — |
| 1915 | George C. Rogers | Independent | 5 | 4 | 0 | .556 | — | — | — | — | — | — | — | — |
| 1916 | Thomas S. McMillan | Independent | 5 | 5 | 0 | .500 | — | — | — | — | — | — | — | — |
| 1917 | "Shorty" O'Brien | Independent | 0 | 2 | 0 | .000 | — | — | — | — | — | — | — | — |
| 1918 | "Shorty" O'Brien | Independent | 3 | 7 | 0 | .300 | — | — | — | — | — | — | — | — |
| 1919 | Thomas S. McMillan | Independent | 3 | 7 | 0 | .300 | — | — | — | — | — | — | — | — |
| 1920 | Ed Sabre | Independent | 3 | 1 | 0 | .750 | — | — | — | — | — | — | — | — |
| 1921 | George C. Rogers | Independent | 2 | 7 | 0 | .222 | — | — | — | — | — | — | — | — |
| 1922 | George C. Rogers | Independent | 6 | 6 | 0 | .500 | — | — | — | — | — | — | — | — |
| 1923 | George C. Rogers | Independent | 3 | 8 | 0 | .273 | — | — | — | — | — | — | — | — |
| 1924 | George C. Rogers | Independent | 3 | 6 | 0 | .333 | — | — | — | — | — | — | — | — |
| 1925 | "Bull Dog" Drummond | Independent | 2 | 7 | 0 | .222 | — | — | — | — | — | — | — | — |
| 1926 | H. L. "Matty" Matthews | Independent | 3 | 7 | 1 | .300 | — | — | — | — | — | — | — | — |
| 1927 | H. L. "Matty" Matthews | Independent | — | — | — | — | — | — | — | — | — | — | — | — |
| 1928 | H. L. "Matty" Matthews | Independent | 1 | 12 | 0 | .077 | — | — | — | — | — | — | — | — |
| 1929 | H. L. "Matty" Matthews | Independent | — | — | — | — | — | — | — | — | — | — | — | — |
| 1930 | H. L. "Matty" Matthews | Independent | — | — | — | — | — | — | — | — | — | — | — | — |
| 1931 | Jimmy Floyd | Independent | — | — | — | — | — | — | — | — | — | — | — | — |
| 1932 | No team | | | | | | | | | | | | | |
| 1933 | No team | | | | | | | | | | | | | |
| 1934 | No team | | | | | | | | | | | | | |
| 1935 | Tatum Gressette | Independent | — | — | — | — | — | — | — | — | — | — | — | — |
| 1936 | Herman "Red" Smith | Independent | — | — | — | — | — | — | — | — | — | — | — | — |
| 1937 | H. L. "Matty" Matthews | Independent | — | — | — | — | — | — | — | — | — | — | — | — |
| 1938 | H. L. "Matty" Matthews | Independent | 6 | 6 | 0 | .500 | — | — | — | — | — | — | — | — |
| 1939 | Not available | Independent | — | — | — | — | — | — | — | — | — | — | — | — |
| 1940 | Not available | Independent | — | — | — | — | — | — | — | — | — | — | — | — |
| 1941 | No team | | | | | | | | | | | | | |
| 1942 | No team | | | | | | | | | | | | | |
| 1943 | No team | | | | | | | | | | | | | |
| 1944 | No team | | | | | | | | | | | | | |
| 1945 | No team | | | | | | | | | | | | | |
| 1946 | No team | | | | | | | | | | | | | |
| 1947 | Dusty Rhodes | Southern | 2 | 5 | 0 | .286 | — | — | — | — | — | — | — | — |
| 1948 | Bunzy O'Neal | Southern | 6 | 7 | 0 | .462 | — | — | — | — | — | — | — | — |
| 1949 | Jeff Clark | Southern | — | — | — | — | — | — | — | — | — | — | — | — |
| 1950 | Jim Bailey | Southern | — | — | — | — | — | — | — | — | — | — | — | — |
| 1951 | Jeff Clark | Southern | — | — | — | — | — | — | — | — | — | — | — | — |
| 1952 | John D. McMillan | Southern | — | — | — | — | — | — | — | — | — | — | — | — |
| 1953 | John D. McMillan | Southern | 9 | 11 | 0 | .450 | — | — | — | — | — | — | — | — |
| 1954 | Fred Montsdeoca | Southern | 5 | 9 | 0 | .357 | 3 | 2 | 0 | .600 | 5th (10) | — | — | — |
| 1955 | Fred Montsdeoca | Southern | 12 | 11 | 0 | .522 | 6 | 3 | 0 | .667 | 4th (10) | — | — | — |
| 1956 | Fred Montsdeoca | Southern | 14 | 13 | 0 | .519 | 4 | 5 | 0 | .444 | 8th (10) | — | — | — |
| 1957 | Mack Erwin | Southern | 10 | 10 | 1 | .500 | 3 | 4 | 1 | .429 | 7th (10) | — | — | — |
| 1958 | Mack Erwin | Southern | 15 | 9 | 0 | .625 | 7 | 3 | 0 | .700 | 3rd (10) | — | — | — |
| 1959 | Mack Erwin | Southern | 19 | 5 | 0 | .792 | 6 | 3 | 0 | .667 | 3rd (9) | — | — | — |
| 1960 | Mack Erwin | Southern | 18 | 6 | 0 | .750 | 8 | 2 | 0 | .800 | T-1st (9) | — | District 3 Regional | 20 |
| 1961 | Jim Newsome | Southern | 11 | 8 | 0 | .579 | 5 | 6 | 0 | .455 | 7th (9) | — | — | — |
| 1962 | Jim Newsome | Southern | 10 | 13 | 0 | .435 | 3 | 7 | 0 | .300 | 7th (9) | — | — | — |
| 1963 | Jim Newsome | Southern | 9 | 10 | 0 | .474 | 4 | 7 | 0 | .364 | 5th (9) | — | — | — |
| 1964 | Jim Newsome | Southern | 7 | 12 | 0 | .368 | 3 | 10 | 0 | .231 | 8th (9) | — | — | — |
| 1965 | Chal Port | Southern | 12 | 12 | 0 | .500 | 9 | 7 | 0 | .563 | 5th (9) | — | — | — |
| 1966 | Chal Port | Southern | 8 | 16 | 0 | .333 | 3 | 9 | 0 | .250 | 8th (9) | — | — | — |
| 1967 | Chal Port | Southern | 9 | 16 | 0 | .360 | 6 | 9 | 0 | .400 | 7th (9) | — | — | — |
| 1968 | Chal Port | Southern | 16 | 10 | 0 | .615 | 4 | 5 | 0 | .444 | 6th (9) | — | — | — |
| 1969 | Chal Port | Southern | 18 | 10 | 0 | .643 | 10 | 6 | 0 | .625 | 2nd South (4) | — | — | — |
| 1970 | Chal Port | Southern | 15 | 12 | 1 | .554 | 6 | 8 | 1 | .429 | 3rd South (4) | — | — | — |
| 1971 | Chal Port | Southern | 22 | 9 | 0 | .710 | 11 | 5 | 0 | .688 | T-1st (8) | — | — | — |
| 1972 | Chal Port | Southern | 17 | 13 | 0 | .567 | 9 | 7 | 0 | .563 | 4th (8) | — | — | — |
| 1973 | Chal Port | Southern | 16 | 14 | 0 | .553 | 8 | 5 | 0 | .615 | 3rd (8) | — | — | — |
| 1974 | Chal Port | Southern | 17 | 11 | 0 | .607 | 7 | 7 | 0 | .500 | 4th (8) | — | — | — |
| 1975 | Chal Port | Southern | 21 | 9 | 0 | .700 | 11 | 3 | 0 | .786 | 1st (8) | — | Atlantic Regional | 28 |
| 1976 | Chal Port | Southern | 18 | 9 | 0 | .667 | 7 | 4 | 0 | .636 | 3rd (8) | — | — | — |
| 1977 | Chal Port | Southern | 21 | 11 | 0 | .656 | 10 | 4 | 0 | .714 | 3rd (10) | — | — | — |
| 1978 | Chal Port | Southern | 30 | 9 | 0 | .769 | 9 | 5 | 0 | .643 | 3rd (8) | — | — | — |
| 1979 | Chal Port | Southern | 27 | 15 | 0 | .643 | 13 | 3 | 0 | .813 | 1st (9) | — | Atlantic Regional | — |
| 1980 | Chal Port | Southern | 23 | 14 | 0 | .626 | 9 | 6 | 0 | .600 | 5th (9) | — | — | — |
| 1981 | Chal Port | Southern | 31 | 13 | 0 | .705 | 11 | 5 | 0 | .688 | 4th (8) | — | — | — |
| 1982 | Chal Port | Southern | 40 | 8 | 0 | .833 | 14 | 2 | 0 | .875 | 1st (9) | — | East Regional | — |
| 1983 | Chal Port | Southern | 34 | 10 | 0 | .773 | 12 | 2 | 0 | .857 | 1st (8) | — | East Regional | 21 |
| 1984 | Chal Port | Southern | 26 | 21 | 0 | .553 | 12 | 5 | 0 | .706 | 2nd South (4) | — | — | — |
| 1985 | Chal Port | Southern | 29 | 20 | 0 | .592 | 8 | 10 | 0 | .444 | 3rd South (4) | — | — | — |
| 1986 | Chal Port | Southern | 29 | 20 | 0 | .592 | 9 | 9 | 0 | .500 | 3rd South (4) | — | — | — |
| 1987 | Chal Port | Southern | 19 | 31 | 0 | .380 | 6 | 12 | 0 | .333 | 3rd South (4) | — | — | — |
| 1988 | Chal Port | Southern | 33 | 20 | 0 | .623 | 12 | 6 | 0 | .667 | 2nd South (4) | — | — | — |
| 1989 | Chal Port | Southern | 30 | 20 | 0 | .600 | 8 | 9 | 0 | .471 | 5th (7) | — | — | — |
| 1990 | Chal Port | Southern | 46 | 14 | 0 | .767 | 13 | 1 | 0 | .929 | 1st (7) | 1st | 1990 College World Series | 6 |
| 1991 | Chal Port | Southern | 34 | 19 | 1 | .639 | 16 | 2 | 0 | .889 | 1st (7) | — | — | — |
| 1992 | Fred Jordan | Southern | 35 | 20 | 0 | .636 | 10 | 9 | 0 | .526 | 4th (8) | — | — | — |
| 1993 | Fred Jordan | Southern | 32 | 25 | 0 | .561 | 13 | 9 | 0 | .591 | 3rd (9) | — | — | — |
| 1994 | Fred Jordan | Southern | 32 | 24 | 0 | .485 | 11 | 13 | 0 | .458 | 5th (9) | 1st | East Regional | — |
| 1995 | Fred Jordan | Southern | 39 | 21 | 0 | .650 | 19 | 5 | 0 | .792 | 1st (9) | 1st | Mideast Regional | — |
| 1996 | Fred Jordan | Southern | 33 | 26 | 0 | .559 | 13 | 10 | 0 | .565 | 4th (9) | — | — | — |
| 1997 | Fred Jordan | Southern | 37 | 21 | 0 | .638 | 16 | 7 | 0 | .696 | 3rd (9) | — | — | — |
| 1998 | Fred Jordan | Southern | 37 | 24 | 0 | .607 | 21 | 5 | 0 | .808 | 2nd (10) | 1st | East Regional | — |
| 1999 | Fred Jordan | Southern | 41 | 20 | 0 | .672 | 24 | 5 | 0 | .828 | 1st (11) | 1st | Tallahassee Regional | — |
| 2000 | Fred Jordan | Southern | 39 | 20 | 0 | .661 | 23 | 7 | 0 | .767 | T-1st (11) | — | — | — |
| 2001 | Fred Jordan | Southern | 38 | 24 | 0 | .613 | 20 | 10 | 0 | .667 | 2nd (11) | 1st | Columbia Regional | — |
| 2002 | Fred Jordan | Southern | 31 | 26 | 0 | .544 | 22 | 8 | 0 | .733 | 1st (11) | — | — | — |
| 2003 | Fred Jordan | Southern | 32 | 25 | 0 | .561 | 19 | 11 | 0 | .633 | 3rd (11) | — | — | — |
| 2004 | Fred Jordan | Southern | 39 | 28 | 0 | .582 | 21 | 9 | 0 | .700 | T-2nd (11) | 1st | Columbia Regional | — |
| 2005 | Fred Jordan | Southern | 25 | 34 | 0 | .424 | 14 | 16 | 0 | .467 | 6th (11) | — | — | — |
| 2006 | Fred Jordan | Southern | 34 | 27 | 0 | .557 | 15 | 12 | 0 | .556 | 5th (10) | — | — | — |
| 2007 | Fred Jordan | Southern | 34 | 27 | 0 | .557 | 12 | 15 | 0 | .444 | 7th (10) | — | — | — |
| 2008 | Fred Jordan | Southern | 28 | 28 | 0 | .500 | 12 | 15 | 0 | .444 | 8th (10) | — | — | — |
| 2009 | Fred Jordan | Southern | 37 | 22 | 0 | .627 | 20 | 10 | 0 | .667 | 3rd (11) | — | — | — |
| 2010 | Fred Jordan | Southern | 43 | 22 | 0 | .662 | 24 | 6 | 0 | .800 | 1st (11) | 1st | Columbia Regional | — |
| 2011 | Fred Jordan | Southern | 20 | 36 | 0 | .357 | 8 | 22 | 0 | .267 | 11th (11) | — | — | — |
| 2012 | Fred Jordan | Southern | 25 | 33 | 0 | .431 | 13 | 17 | 0 | .433 | T-7th (11) | — | — | — |
| 2013 | Fred Jordan | Southern | 35 | 25 | 0 | .583 | 18 | 12 | 0 | .600 | 4th (11) | — | — | — |
| 2014 | Fred Jordan | Southern | 24 | 34 | 0 | .414 | 8 | 18 | 0 | .308 | 10th (10) | — | — | — |
| 2015 | Fred Jordan | Southern | 28 | 30 | 0 | .483 | 10 | 14 | 0 | .417 | 8th (9) | — | — | — |
| 2016 | Fred Jordan | Southern | 17 | 42 | 0 | .288 | 6 | 18 | 0 | .250 | 8th (9) | — | — | — |
| 2017 | Fred Jordan | Southern | 16 | 35 | 0 | .314 | 7 | 17 | 0 | .292 | T-8th (9) | — | — | — |
| 2018 | Tony Skole | Southern | 19 | 34 | 0 | .358 | 8 | 16 | 0 | .333 | 8th (9) | — | — | — |
| 2019 | Tony Skole | Southern | 12 | 43 | 0 | .218 | 5 | 19 | 0 | .208 | 9th (9) | — | — | — |
| 2020 | Tony Skole | Southern | 10 | 6 | 0 | .625 | Season cancelled due to COVID-19 pandemic | | | | | | | |
| 2021 | Tony Skole | Southern | 12 | 39 | 0 | .235 | 4 | 25 | 0 | .138 | 4th (Red) | — | — | — |
| 2022 | Tony Skole | Southern | 26 | 31 | 0 | .456 | 5 | 16 | 0 | .238 | 8th (8) | — | — | — |
| 2023 | Tony Skole | Southern | 22 | 31 | 0 | .415 | 7 | 14 | 0 | .333 | 8th (8) | — | — | — |
| 2024 | Tony Skole | Southern | 21 | 32 | 0 | .396 | 3 | 18 | 0 | .143 | 8th (8) | — | — | — |
| 2025 | Russell Triplett | Southern | 31 | 26 | 0 | .544 | 12 | 9 | 0 | .571 | 3rd (8) | — | — | — |
| 2026 | Russell Triplett | Southern | 36 | 26 | 0 | .581 | 11 | 10 | 0 | .524 | 5th (8) | 1st | Atlanta Regional | — |

=== Notes ===
Sources:
