= Chris Lemonis =

American baseball coach (born 1970)

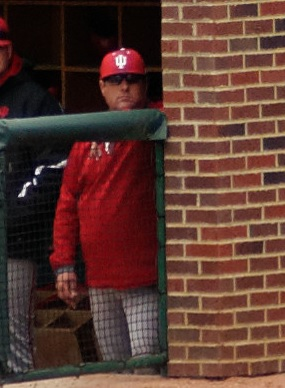
- Lemonis in 2016 with Indiana

Current position
- Title: Head coach
- Team: Coastal Carolina
- Conference: Sun Belt

Biographical details
- Born: January 22, 1970 (age 56); Starkville, Mississippi, U.S.

Playing career
- 1990–1993: The Citadel
- Position: First baseman

Coaching career (HC unless noted)
- 1995–2006: The Citadel (assistant)
- 2007–2014: Louisville (assistant)
- 2015–2018: Indiana
- 2019–2025: Mississippi State
- 2027–present: Coastal Carolina

Head coaching record
- Overall: 373–226–2 (.622)
- Tournaments: NCAA: 20–11 (.645)

Accomplishments and honors

Championships
- As head coach: College World Series (2021); SEC West Division (2019); As assistant coach: 4× SoCon regular season (1995, 1999, 2001, 2004); 5× SoCon tournament (1995, 1998, 1999, 2001, 2004)

Awards
- As head coach: ABCA/ATEC National Collegiate Coach of the Year (2021); ABCA/ATEC NCAA Div.I South Regional Coach of the Year (2021); As assistant coach: ABCA/Baseball America Assistant Coach of the Year (2013); As player: 2× second-team All-SoCon (1991, 1993)

Christopher Michael Lemonis (born January 22, 1970) is an American college baseball coach who is the head coach of the Coastal Carolina Chanticleers baseball team.

Lemonis grew up in Myrtle Beach, South Carolina. He played college baseball as a first baseman at The Citadel, where he appeared with the team in the 1990 College World Series. He later earned All-SoCon honors twice and led the team in several offensive categories as a senior in 1993. In 1995, Lemonis began his coaching career as an assistant coach for The Citadel, a position he would hold until 2006. During his time on staff, The Citadel qualified for the NCAA tournament five times and had seven All-American players. From 2007 to 2014, Lemonis was an assistant coach at Louisville, helping Louisville make seven NCAA tournament appearances including the 2007 College World Series. In 2013, Lemonis won Assistant Coach of the Year honors from the American Baseball Coaches Association and Baseball America.

Lemonis held his first head coaching position at Indiana from 2015 to 2018, during which Indiana had 141 wins and three NCAA tournament appearances. Beginning in 2019, Lemonis was head coach at Mississippi State. After appearing in the 2019 College World Series, Mississippi State won the 2021 College World Series title, the first national championship in any sport for the school.

== Early life and education ==
Lemonis was born January 22, 1970, in Starkville, Mississippi, when his father Thomas was a student at Mississippi State University. Growing up with a Greek American family in Myrtle Beach, South Carolina, Lemonis graduated from Socastee High School in 1988.

After high school, Lemonis enrolled at The Citadel, The Military College of South Carolina. Initially majoring in electrical engineering like his father, Lemonis changed his major to physical education one year into college, a move that worried his father. Lemonis played at first base for The Citadel Bulldogs baseball from 1990 to 1993 under head coaches Chal Port and Fred Jordan, including an appearance in the 1990 College World Series. A two-time All-Southern Conference second team selection in 1991 and 1993, Lemonis hit .367 with 10 home runs and 66 RBI as a senior in 1993. Lemonis completed his bachelor's degree in physical education at The Citadel in 1992.

== Coaching career ==
=== Assistant coach (1995–2014) ===
From 1995 to 2006, Lemonis was an assistant coach at The Citadel under Fred Jordan, including four seasons as associate head coach from 2003 to 2006. With Lemonis on staff, The Citadel appeared in the NCAA tournament five times and produced seven All-Americans.

On June 30, 2006, Lemonis joined fellow Citadel alum Dan McDonnell at Louisville as an assistant coach. At Louisville, Lemonis helped the Cardinals to three College World Series appearances and seven NCAA appearances in eight seasons. Lemonis was responsible for recruiting and worked with hitters at Louisville, producing 33 professional players, several highly ranked recruiting classes, and three fifty win seasons. In 2013, he was named the American Baseball Coaches Association/Baseball America Assistant Coach of the Year.

=== Indiana (2015–2018) ===
On July 24, 2014, Lemonis got his first head coaching job at Indiana, a rising program with two straight Big Ten Conference championships and a College World Series participant in the previous two seasons. In his first season with the Hoosiers during the 2015 NCAA Division I baseball season, they went 35–24 (12–10 in the Big Ten) in the regular season. Lemonis would lead the Hoosiers to the NCAA Regionals before being defeated by Vanderbilt in the second round.

In his second season with the Hoosiers, Lemonis finished the 2016 season 32–24 overall and 15–9 in conference play. Lemonis and the Hoosiers would be invited to the Big Ten tournament where they would eventually lose to Maryland, in the second round.

Following the conclusion of the 2017 regular season, Lemonis and the Hoosiers would finish the season 34–24–2 overall and 14–9–1 in conference play. After a second round exit in the 2017 Big Ten tournament, the Hoosiers would be invited to the 2017 NCAA tournament, in the Lexington Regional. Indiana would eventually be eliminated from the regional, following a loss to Kentucky.

Lemonis and his Hoosiers would finish the 2018 regular season 40–19 overall and 14–9 in conference play; the Hoosiers' 40 wins is Lemonis' highest win total in a season in his 4-year tenure with Indiana. Finishing 5th in the Big Ten, the Hoosiers would fall in the second round of the 2018 Big Ten tournament to Illinois. Lemonis' Hoosiers would then be selected to play in the 2018 NCAA tournament, beginning in the Austin Regional. The Hoosiers would eventually lose in the final round of the Austin Regional to Texas by a score of 2–3.

=== Mississippi State (2019–2025) ===
On June 25, 2018, Mississippi State announced the hiring Lemonis as head baseball coach, formally ending Lemonis' tenure with the Hoosiers.

In his first season in 2019, Lemonis led Mississippi State to a 52–15 record and College World Series appearance. Lemonis set a new record for wins for a first-year Southeastern Conference (SEC) head coach and the third SEC head baseball coach to advance to the College World Series in his first season. Lemonis followed the 2019 season with a 12–4 start to 2020 before the season was canceled due to COVID-19.

In his third season, Lemonis led Mississippi State to a 50–18 record and the 2021 College World Series title, the first team national championship in Mississippi State sports history.

=== Coastal Carolina (2027–present) ===
On June 11, 2026, Coastal Carolina announced the hiring Lemonis as head baseball coach.

== Head coaching record ==
Record table
| Season | Team | Overall | Conference | Standing | Postseason |
|---|---|---|---|---|---|
Indiana Hoosiers (Big Ten Conference) (2015–2018)
| 2015 | Indiana | 35–24 | 12–10 | 6th | NCAA Regional |
| 2016 | Indiana | 32–24 | 15–9 | T–3rd | |
| 2017 | Indiana | 34–24–2 | 14–9–1 | 6th | NCAA Regional |
| 2018 | Indiana | 40–19 | 14–9 | 5th | NCAA Regional |
| Indiana: | | 141–91–2 (.607) | 55–37–1 (.597) | | |
Mississippi State Bulldogs (Southeastern Conference) (2019–2025)
| 2019 | Mississippi State | 52–15 | 20–10 | T–1st (West) | College World Series |
| 2020 | Mississippi State | 12–4 | 0–0 | (West) | Season canceled due to COVID-19 |
| 2021 | Mississippi State | 50–18 | 20–10 | 2nd (West) | College World Series champions |
| 2022 | Mississippi State | 26–30 | 9–21 | 7th (West) | |
| 2023 | Mississippi State | 27–26 | 9–21 | 6th (West) | |
| 2024 | Mississippi State | 40–23 | 17–13 | 3rd (West) | NCAA Regional |
| 2025 | Mississippi State | 25–19 | 7–14 | 14th | Fired on April 28, 2025 |
| Mississippi State: | | 232–135 (.632) | 82–89 (.480) | | |
Coastal Carolina Chanticleers (Sun Belt Conference) (2027–present)
| 2027 | Coastal Carolina | 0–0 | 0–0 | | |
| Coastal Carolina: | | 0–0 (–) | 0–0 (–) | | |
| Total: | | 373–226–2 (.622) | | | |
National champion Postseason invitational champion Conference regular season champion Conference regular season and conference tournament champion Division regular season champion Division regular season and conference tournament champion Conference tournament champion

== See also ==
- List of current NCAA Division I baseball coaches
