= Bobby Moranda =

American baseball coach

Playing career
- 1983–1984: Harper College
- 1985–1986: Eastern Kentucky
- Position: Outfielder

Coaching career (HC unless noted)
- 1987–1989: Eastern Kentucky (asst.)
- 1990–1995: Virginia (asst.)
- 1996–2001: Wake Forest (asst.)
- 2002–2007: Georgia Tech (asst.)
- 2008–2022: Western Carolina

Head coaching record
- Overall: 401–386–1
- Tournaments: NCAA: 1–2

Accomplishments and honors

Championships
- 2× SoCon Regular season (2013, 2014); SoCon Tournament (2016)

Awards
- SoCon Coach of the Year (2013)

Bobby Moranda is an American college baseball broadcaster for ESPN, former baseball coach and outfielder who retired in 2022. He played college baseball for the Eastern Kentucky Colonels from 1985 to 1986, coached in the Atlantic Coast Conference for 17 seasons (1990-2007) and then served as the head coach of the Western Carolina Catamounts (2008–2022).

== Playing career ==
Moranda first enrolled at Harper College. In 1984, he accepted a scholarship to play for the Eastern Kentucky Colonels baseball team. In two seasons, he batted .307 with 20 home runs and 86 RBI.

== Coaching career ==
In 1987, Moranda began his coaching career as an assistant at Eastern Kentucky. In 1989, Moranda accepted a position as an assistant with the Virginia Cavaliers baseball program. Moranda then joined the coaching staff at Wake Forest in 1995. In 2001, he joined the coaching staff of the Georgia Tech Yellow Jackets baseball team.

Moranda was named one of the nation's top college baseball coaching candidates by Baseball America in 2001.

On July 19, 2007, Moranda was named the head coach of the Western Carolina Catamounts baseball program.

Moranda made his USA Baseball coaching debut in 2018 with the 17U National Team Development Program.

During his 35-year Division I baseball coaching career, Moranda coached twice in Omaha at the College World Series and five times in the NCAA Super Regionals. He retired in 2022 as the winningest coach in Western Carolina Catamounts baseball history.

== Head coaching record ==
Record table
Season	Team	Overall	Conference	Standing	Postseason
Western Carolina Catamounts (Southern Conference) (2008–2022)
2008	Western Carolina	29–28	14–13	7th	SoCon tournament
2009	Western Carolina	35–22	19–10	4th	SoCon tournament
2010	Western Carolina	37–21	16–13	6th	SoCon tournament
2011	Western Carolina	23–31	12–18	8th	SoCon tournament
2012	Western Carolina	32–22	16–14	5th	SoCon tournament
2013	Western Carolina	39–20	23–7	1st	SoCon tournament
2014	Western Carolina	37–18	20–6	1st	SoCon tournament
2015	Western Carolina	21–28	11–13	7th	SoCon tournament
2016	Western Carolina	31–31	15–9	2nd	NCAA Regional
2017	Western Carolina	28–28	15–8	2nd	SoCon tournament
2018	Western Carolina	7–45	5–19	9th	SoCon tournament
2019	Western Carolina	20–32	8–16	8th	SoCon tournament
2020	Western Carolina	8–8	0–0		Season canceled due to COVID-19
2021	Western Carolina	28–21	14–11	3rd (Red)	SoCon tournament
2022	Western Carolina	26–31–1	9–11–1	6th	
Western Carolina:		401–386–1	197–168–1		
Total:		401–386–1			
National champion Postseason invitational champion Conference regular season champion Conference regular season and conference tournament champion Division regular season champion Division regular season and conference tournament champion Conference tournament champion
