= 2004 Southern Conference baseball tournament =

- Teams: 8
- Format: Double-elimination tournament
- Finals site: Joseph P. Riley Jr. Park; Charleston, South Carolina
- Champions: The Citadel (7th title)
- Winning coach: Fred Jordan (6th title)
- MVP: Jonathan Ellis (The Citadel)
- Attendance: 35,150

2004 Southern Conference baseball standings
	Conf.				Overall
Team	W		L	PCT	W		L	PCT
#29 College of Charleston †^{y} ‍‍‍	25	–	5	.833	47	–	16	.746
The Citadel ‍‍‡‍^{y}	21	–	9	.700	39	–	28	.582
Georgia Southern ‍‍‍	21	–	9	.700	34	–	25	.576
Elon ‍‍‍	17	–	13	.567	31	–	28	.525
UNC Greensboro ‍‍‍	16	–	14	.533	33	–	21	.611
East Tennessee State ‍‍‍	15	–	15	.500	28	–	30	.483
Davidson ‍‍‍	13	–	17	.433	20	–	33	.377
Western Carolina ‍‍‍	12	–	18	.400	28	–	31	.475
Furman ‍‍‍	11	–	19	.367	21	–	33	.389
Wofford ‍‍‍	8	–	22	.267	17	–	30	.362
Appalachian State ‍‍‍	6	–	24	.200	10	–	43	.189
† – Conference champion ‡ – SoCon Tournament champion y – Invited to the NCAA tournament As of June 30, 2004; Rankings from Collegiate Baseball

The 2004 Southern Conference baseball tournament was held at Joseph P. Riley Jr. Park in Charleston, South Carolina, from May 26 through 30. Third seeded The Citadel won the tournament and earned the Southern Conference's automatic bid to the 2004 NCAA Division I baseball tournament. It was the Bulldogs seventh SoCon tournament win.

The top eight baseball programs in the conference participated in the double-elimination tournament. Furman, Wofford, and Appalachian State were not in the field. College of Charleston claimed its first top seed by winning its first regular season championship.

== Seeding ==
Team	W	L	Pct	GB	Seed
College of Charleston	25	5	.833	–	1
Georgia Southern	21	9	.700	4	2
The Citadel	21	9	.700	4	3
Elon	17	13	.567	8	4
UNC Greensboro	16	14	.533	9	5
East Tennessee State	15	15	.500	10	6
Davidson	13	17	.433	12	7
Western Carolina	12	18	.400	13	8
Furman	11	19	.367	14	
Wofford	8	22	.267	17	
Appalachian State	6	24	.200	19	

== Bracket ==
Upper round 1	Upper round 2	Upper final	Final
5	UNC Greensboro	3
4	Elon	12
4	Elon	6
8	Western Carolina	7
8	Western Carolina	4
1	College of Charleston	3
8	Western Carolina	5
3	The Citadel	2
7	Davidson	5
2	Georgia Southern	2
3	The Citadel	10
7	Davidson	2
6	East Tennessee State	2
3	The Citadel	6	8	Western Carolina	2	1
3	The Citadel	9	8
Lower round 1	Lower round 2	Lower round 3	Lower final
7	Davidson	0
1	College of Charleston	5	1	College of Charleston	3	3	The Citadel	7
5	UNC Greensboro	4	1	College of Charleston	4	1	College of Charleston	2
4	Elon	3
4	Elon	7
2	Georgia Southern	12	2	Georgia Southern	3
6	East Tennessee State	4

== All-Tournament Team ==
Position	Player	School
P	Jonathan Ellis	The Citadel
C	Brian Sigmon	Western Carolina
1B	Chip Cannon	The Citadel
2B	Jon Aughey	The Citadel
SS	Chris Davis	Western Carolina
3B	Chris Ard	The Citadel
(tie)	Denver Edick	Western Carolina
OF	Matt Covington	The Citadel
OF	Byron Barber	College of Charleston
OF	Andy Phillips	The Citadel
DH	Mark Egleton	The Citadel

Walt Nadzak Award, Tournament Most Outstanding Player
Jonathan Ellis
The Citadel
