= 2012 Southern Conference baseball tournament =

- 2012 SoCon baseball tournament logo
- Teams: 8
- Format: Double-elimination tournament
- Finals site: Fluor Field at the West End; Greenville, South Carolina
- Champions: Samford (1 title)
- Winning coach: Casey Dunn (1 title)
- MVP: Josh Martin (Samford)
- Television: ESPN3

2012 Southern Conference baseball standings
	Conf.				Overall
Team	W		L	PCT	W		L	PCT
Appalachian State ‍†‍‍^{y}	21	–	9	.700	38	–	14	.731
College of Charleston ‍†‍‍^{y}	21	–	9	.700	37	–	18	.673
Elon ‍‍‍	20	–	10	.667	31	–	24	.564
Samford ‍‍‡‍^{y}	19	–	11	.633	35	–	21	.625
Western Carolina ‍‍‍	16	–	14	.533	32	–	22	.593
Georgia Southern ‍‍‍	15	–	15	.500	30	–	26	.536
Furman ‍‍‍	13	–	17	.433	26	–	29	.473
The Citadel ‍‍‍	13	–	17	.433	24	–	31	.436
UNC Greensboro ‍‍‍	10	–	20	.333	25	–	27	.481
Davidson ‍‍‍	9	–	21	.300	22	–	32	.407
Wofford ‍‍‍	8	–	22	.267	17	–	31	.354
† – Conference champion ‡ – Tournament champion y – Invited to the NCAA Division I Baseball Championship; As of May 20, 2012; Rankings from Collegiate Baseball

The 2012 Southern Conference baseball tournament took place at Fluor Field at the West End in Greenville, South Carolina, from May 23 through 27. The final game was televised on ESPN3

The tournament used a double-elimination format. Only the top eight teams in the conference standings participated, leaving three UNC Greensboro, Wofford, and Davidson out.

Samford went 4–0 to win the tournament, clinching the conference's automatic berth in the 2012 NCAA Division I baseball tournament and the school's first ever Regional appearance. 2012 also marks the school's first baseball championship since joining the Southern Conference in 2008.

== Seeding ==
Team	W	L	Pct.	GB	Seed
Appalachian State	21	9	.700	–	1
College of Charleston	21	9	.700	–	2
Elon	20	10	.667	1	3
Samford	19	11	.633	2	4
Western Carolina	16	14	.533	5	5
Georgia Southern	15	15	.500	6	6
The Citadel	13	17	.433	8	7
Furman	13	17	.433	8	8
UNC Greensboro	10	20	.333	11	–
Wofford	9	21	.300	12	–
Davidson	8	22	.267	13	–

- Appalachian State earned the tiebreaker over College of Charleston after winning the regular season series 8–6, 8–2, 3–8
- The Citadel earned the tiebreaker over Furman after winning the regular season series 7–0, 3–1, 6–8

== Results ==
First round
7	The Citadel	8*
2	College of Charleston	6
6	Georgia Southern	19
3	Elon	2
2	College of Charleston	12
3	Elon	14
8	Furman	5
1	Appalachian State	7
5	Western Carolina	0
4	Samford	7
8	Furman	9
5	Western Carolina	8

Second round
7	The Citadel	1
6	Georgia Southern	8
7	The Citadel	3
3	Elon	7
1	Appalachian State	7
4	Samford	12
1	Appalachian State	4
8	Furman	13

Semifinals
6	Georgia Southern	10	-
3	Elon	7	-
4	Samford	12	-
8	Furman	2	-

Final
6	Georgia Southern	6
4	Samford	9*

- As tournament host, game order and times would have been adjusted to allow Furman to play the 5:00 pm game as long as it remained in the winner's bracket.
- * denotes extra innings
- The first-round game between Georgia Southern and Elon tied the Southern Conference Tournament record for largest margin of victory at 17.
- The first round elimination game between Elon and College of Charleston broke the Southern Conference Tournament record with 39 combined hits (21 for Elon, 18 for College of Charleston).
- The championship game was a rematch of the 2011 championship game where Georgia Southern defeated Samford 1–0.

== All-Tournament Team ==
Position	Player	School
SP	Justin Hess	Georgia Southern
SP	Josh Martin	Samford
RP	C.K. Irby	Samford
C	Chase Griffin	Georgia Southern
1B	Ryan Kinsella	Elon
2B	Tyler Avera	Georgia Southern
2B	Zeth Stone	Samford
SS	Austin Allison	Samford
3B	Chris Ohmstede	Furman
OF	Taylor Johnson	Furman
OF	Phillip Ervin	Samford
OF	Brandon Miller	Samford
DH	Garren Palmer	Georgia Southern

Walt Nadzak Award, Tournament Most Outstanding Player
Josh Martin
Samford
