= 2001 Southern Conference baseball tournament =

- Teams: 8
- Format: Double-elimination tournament
- Finals site: Joseph P. Riley Jr. Park; Charleston, South Carolina
- Champions: The Citadel (6th title)
- Winning coach: Fred Jordan (baseball) (5th title)
- MVP: Randy Corn (The Citadel)
- Attendance: 27,788

2001 Southern Conference baseball standings
	Conf.				Overall
Team	W		L	PCT	W		L	PCT
Georgia Southern ‍†‍‍^{y}	21	–	9	.700	42	–	20	.677
The Citadel ‍‍‡‍^{y}	20	–	10	.667	38	–	24	.613
Furman ‍‍‍	18	–	11	.621	30	–	25	.545
Western Carolina ‍‍‍	18	–	11	.621	30	–	26	.536
UNC Greensboro ‍‍‍	17	–	12	.586	31	–	28	.525
Appalachian State ‍‍‍	12	–	14	.462	21	–	32	.396
East Tennessee State ‍‍‍	13	–	17	.433	21	–	32	.396
College of Charleston ‍‍‍	10	–	16	.385	24	–	28	.462
Wofford ‍‍‍	9	–	17	.346	17	–	31	.354
Davidson ‍‍‍	10	–	20	.333	19	–	32	.373
VMI ‍‍‍	8	–	19	.296	15	–	32	.319
† – Conference champion ‡ – SoCon Tournament champion y – Invited to the NCAA tournament As of June 30, 2001; Rankings from Collegiate Baseball

The 2001 Southern Conference baseball tournament was held at Joseph P. Riley Jr. Park in Charleston, South Carolina, from May 22 through 25. Second seeded The Citadel won the tournament and earned the Southern Conference's automatic bid to the 2001 NCAA Division I baseball tournament. It was the Bulldogs sixth tournament win.

The tournament used a double-elimination format. Only the top eight teams participate, so Wofford, Davidson, and VMI were not in the field.

== Seeding ==
Team	W	L	Pct	GB	Seed
Georgia Southern	21	9	.700	–	1
The Citadel	20	10	.667	1	2
Furman	18	11	.621	2.5	3
Western Carolina	18	11	.621	2.5	4
UNC Greensboro	17	12	.586	3.5	5
Appalachian State	12	14	.462	7	6
East Tennessee State	13	17	.433	8	7
College of Charleston	10	16	.385	9	8
Wofford	9	17	.346	10	
Davidson	10	20	.333	11	
VMI	8	19	.296	11.5	

== Bracket ==
Upper round 1	Upper round 2	Upper final	Final
5	UNC Greensboro	7
4	Western Carolina	5
1	Georgia Southern	10
5	UNC Greensboro	7
8	College of Charleston	2
1	Georgia Southern	10
2	The Citadel	3
1	Georgia Southern	2
6	Appalachian State	4
3	Furman	2
2	The Citadel	5
6	Appalachian State	3
7	East Tennessee State	2
2	The Citadel	3	5	UNC Greensboro	3
2	The Citadel	4
Lower round 1	Lower round 2	Lower round 3	Lower final
8	College of Charleston	3
4	Western Carolina	7	6	Appalachian State	4	1	Georgia Southern	0
8	College of Charleston	9	6	Appalachian State	1	5	UNC Greensboro	4
5	UNC Greensboro	2
7	East Tennessee State	6
3	Furman	2	5	UNC Greensboro	9
7	East Tennessee State	8

== All-Tournament Team ==
Position	Player	School
P	Ted Toler	UNC Greensboro
P	Randy Corn	The Citadel
C	Brendon Gilligan	Georgia Southern
1B	Andy Baxter	East Tennessee State
2B	Shan Schumaker	UNC Greensboro
3B	Dallas McPherson	The Citadel
SS	Jemel Spearman	Georgia Southern
OF	Jasha Balcom	College of Charleston
OF	Nathan Copeland	East Tennessee State
OF	Brook Dantzler	The Citadel
OF	Chris Cook	UNC Greensboro
DH	Chris Mittendorf	UNC Greensboro

Walt Nadzak Award, Tournament Most Outstanding Player
Randy Corn
The Citadel
