= Casey Dunn =

American college baseball coach

Current position
- Title: Head coach
- Team: UAB
- Conference: The American
- Record: 130–147 (.469)

Biographical details
- Born: October 3, 1976 (age 50); Birmingham, Alabama, U.S.
- Education: Auburn University

Playing career
- 1996–1999: Auburn
- 1999: Spokane Indians
- 2000: Wilmington Blue Rocks
- Position: Catcher

Coaching career (HC unless noted)
- 2001–2003: Hoover (AL) Spain Park
- 2004: Auburn (assistant)
- 2005–2021: Samford
- 2022–present: UAB

Head coaching record
- Overall: 663–569 (.538)
- Tournaments: Ohio Valley: 5–6; Southern: 18–12; American Athletic: 1–4; NCAA: 3–6

Accomplishments and honors

Championships
- Ohio Valley Regular season (2006); 3 Southern Tournament (2012, 2018, 2021); Southern Regular season (2019)

Awards
- Ohio Valley Coach of the Year (2006); SoCon Coach of the Year (2019); AAC Coach of the Year (2026)

Casey Brent Dunn (born October 3, 1976) is an American baseball coach and former catcher, who is the current head baseball coach of the UAB Blazers.

== Career ==
He played college baseball at Auburn for coach Hal Baird from 1996 to 1999 and played in Minor League Baseball (MiLB) for 2 seasons from 1999 to 2000. He then served as the head coach of the Samford Bulldogs (2005–2021).

== Head coaching record ==
Record table
Season	Team	Overall	Conference	Standing	Postseason
Samford Bulldogs (Ohio Valley Conference) (2005–2008)
2005	Samford	20–36	13–14	8th	
2006	Samford	34–25	21–3	1st	Ohio Valley tournament
2007	Samford	32–28	14–13	4th	Ohio Valley tournament
2008	Samford	33–22	19–7	2nd	Ohio Valley tournament
Samford Bulldogs (Southern Conference) (2009–2021)
2009	Samford	17–35	9–21	9th	
2010	Samford	31–25	17–12	5th	Southern tournament
2011	Samford	37–23	18–12	T-3rd	Southern tournament
2012	Samford	41–23	19–11	4th	NCAA Regionals
2013	Samford	27–30	12–17	8th	Southern tournament
2014	Samford	35–25	15–12	3rd	Southern tournament
2015	Samford	32–26	14-10	2nd	Southern tournament
2016	Samford	35–26	13–11	4th	Southern tournament
2017	Samford	33–26	11–13	6th	Southern tournament
2018	Samford	37–26	16–8	2nd	NCAA Regionals
2019	Samford	41–19	19–5	1st	Southern tournament
2020	Samford	13–2	0–0		Season canceled due to COVID-19
2021	Samford	35–24	20–10	1st (Blue)	NCAA Regionals
Samford:		533–422 (.558)	254–181 (.584)		
UAB Blazers (Conference USA) (2022–2023)
2022	UAB	31–25	13–17	8th	
2023	UAB	17–37	8–22	10th	
UAB:		– (–)	21–39 (.350)		
UAB Blazers (American Conference) (2024–present)
2024	UAB	26–29	13–14	5th	American tournament
2025	UAB	24–30	8–19	T–9th	
2026	UAB	32–26	15-12	4th	American tournament
UAB:		130–147 (.469)	36–45 (.444)		
Total:		663–569 (.538)			
National champion Postseason invitational champion Conference regular season champion Conference regular season and conference tournament champion Division regular season champion Division regular season and conference tournament champion Conference tournament champion

== See also ==
- List of current NCAA Division I baseball coaches
