= 1998 Southern Conference baseball tournament =

- Teams: 8
- Format: Double-elimination tournament
- Finals site: Joseph P. Riley Jr. Park; Charleston, South Carolina
- Champions: The Citadel (4th title)
- Winning coach: Fred Jordan (3rd title)
- MVP: Brian Rogers (The Citadel)
- Attendance: 22,644

1998 Southern Conference baseball standings
	Conf.				Overall
Team	W		L	PCT	W		L	PCT
UNC Greensboro ‍†‍‍	22	–	5	.815	40	–	18	.690
The Citadel ‍‍‡‍^{y}	21	–	5	.808	37	–	24	.607
Western Carolina ‍‍‍	20	–	6	.769	42	–	15	.737
Furman ‍‍‍	12	–	12	.500	21	–	27	.438
Wofford ‍‍‍	10	–	12	.455	15	–	32	.319
Georgia Southern ‍‍‍	9	–	15	.375	22	–	30	.423
Davidson ‍‍‍	8	–	16	.333	13	–	38	.255
East Tennessee State ‍‍‍	8	–	18	.308	18	–	31	.367
VMI ‍‍‍	7	–	17	.292	14	–	35	.286
Appalachian State ‍‍‍	6	–	17	.261	13	–	28	.317
† – Conference champion ‡ – SoCon Tournament champion y – Invited to the NCAA tournament As of June 30, 1998; Rankings from Collegiate Baseball

The 1998 Southern Conference baseball tournament was held at Joseph P. Riley Jr. Park in Charleston, South Carolina, from April 30 through May 3. Second seeded The Citadel won the tournament and earned the Southern Conference's automatic bid to the 1998 NCAA Division I baseball tournament. It was the Bulldogs fourth tournament win

The tournament used a double-elimination format. Only the top eight teams participated, so VMI and Appalachian State were not in the field. 1998 was the first season with UNC Greensboro and Wofford in the league, having joined the conference in the previous offseason.

== Seeding ==
Team	W	L	Pct	GB	Seed
UNC Greensboro	22	5	.815	–	1
The Citadel	21	5	.808	.5	2
Western Carolina	20	6	.769	1.5	3
Furman	12	12	.500	8.5	4
Wofford	10	12	.455	9.5	5
Georgia Southern	9	15	.375	11.5	6
Davidson	8	16	.333	12.5	7
East Tennessee State	8	18	.308	13.5	8
VMI	7	17	.292	13.5	
Appalachian State	6	17	.261	14	

== Bracket ==
Upper round 1	Upper round 2	Upper final	Final
4	Furman	11
5	Wofford	3
1	UNC Greensboro	14
4	Furman	2
1	UNC Greensboro	10
8	East Tennessee State	3
1	UNC Greensboro	0
2	The Citadel	9
3	Western Carolina	6
6	Georgia Southern	5
3	Western Carolina	0
2	The Citadel	5
2	The Citadel	11
7	Davidson	2	2	The Citadel	12
1	UNC Greensboro	1
Lower round 1	Lower round 2	Lower round 3	Lower final
3	Western Carolina	9
5	Wofford	3	5	Wofford	4	1	UNC Greensboro	4
8	East Tennessee State	2	3	Western Carolina	2	3	Western Carolina	2
4	Furman	1
4	Furman	6
6	Georgia Southern	6	6	Georgia Southern	5
7	Davidson	3

== All-Tournament Team ==
Position	Player	School
P	Brian Rogers	The Citadel
C	Jay Morgan	The Citadel
1B	Philip Hartig	The Citadel
2B	Dominic Pattie	UNC Greensboro
3B	Aaron Haigler	The Citadel
SS	Terrence Smalls	The Citadel
OF	Kevin Durham	The Citadel
OF	Eric Johnson	Western Carolina
OF	Kenny Vawter	UNC Greensboro
DH	Lance Surridge	UNC Greensboro

Walt Nadzak Award, Tournament Most Outstanding Player
Brian Rogers
The Citadel
