= 2014 Southern Conference baseball tournament =

- 2014 SoCon Baseball Tournament
- Teams: 10
- Format: two bracket Double-elimination tournament with championship game
- Finals site: Joseph P. Riley Jr. Park; Charleston, SC
- Champions: Georgia Southern (6th title)
- Winning coach: Rodney Hennon (5th title)
- MVP: Jason Richman (Georgia Southern)

2014 Southern Conference baseball standings
| | Conf. | | | | Overall |
| Team | W | | L | PCT | W | | L | PCT |
|---|---|---|---|---|---|---|---|---|
| Western Carolina ‍†‍‍ | 20 | – | 6 | .769 | 37 | – | 18 | .673 |
| Davidson ‍‍‍ | 17 | – | 8 | .680 | 29 | – | 19 | .604 |
| Georgia Southern ‍‍‡‍^{y} | 15 | – | 12 | .556 | 40 | – | 23 | .635 |
| Samford ‍‍‍ | 15 | – | 12 | .556 | 35 | – | 25 | .583 |
| Wofford ‍‍‍ | 12 | – | 14 | .462 | 32 | – | 28 | .533 |
| Appalachian State ‍‍‍ | 12 | – | 14 | .462 | 21 | – | 34 | .382 |
| Elon ‍‍‍ | 12 | – | 15 | .444 | 27 | – | 26 | .509 |
| Furman ‍‍‍ | 11 | – | 15 | .423 | 26 | – | 32 | .448 |
| UNC Greensboro ‍‍‍ | 8 | – | 16 | .333 | 21 | – | 28 | .429 |
| The Citadel ‍‍‍ | 8 | – | 18 | .308 | 24 | – | 34 | .414 |
† – Conference champion ‡ – Tournament champion y – Invited to the NCAA tournament As of June 30, 2014; Rankings from Collegiate Baseball

The 2014 Southern Conference baseball tournament was held from May 20 through 25 at Joseph P. Riley Jr. Park in Charleston, South Carolina. The annual event determined the conference champion of the Division I Southern Conference in college baseball. Georgia Southern won the tournament for the sixth time, earning the league's automatic bid to the 2014 NCAA Division I baseball tournament. This is the last of 18 athletic championships held by the conference in the 2013–14 academic year.

The tournament was originally held from 1950–53, when the Southern Conference was a large conference composed of several small schools and several large schools, the latter of which would form the Atlantic Coast Conference after the 1953 season. The event was re-established in 1984 and has been held every year since. Western Carolina has claimed nine championships, the most of any school, with The Citadel close behind at eight tournament wins. Georgia Southern and Furman are the only other schools with multiple championships, winning five and two, respectively. Davidson and UNC Greensboro are the only current members to never win a title.

The tournament returned to Charleston for the first time since 2011 after spending the previous two seasons in Greenville, South Carolina. Charleston has hosted the event more than any other city.

== Seeding and format ==
All ten teams will participate in the tournament, with the bottom four seeds playing a single-elimination play-in round. The remaining teams will then be divided into two brackets and play double-elimination tournaments. The winners of each bracket will play a single championship game.

| Team | W | L | Pct | GB | Seed |
|---|---|---|---|---|---|
| Western Carolina | 20 | 6 | .769 | – | 1 |
| Davidson | 17 | 8 | .680 | 2.5 | 2 |
| Samford | 15 | 12 | .556 | 5.5 | 3 |
| Georgia Southern | 15 | 12 | .556 | 5.5 | 4 |
| Appalachian State | 12 | 14 | .462 | 8 | 5 |
| Wofford | 12 | 14 | .462 | 8 | 6 |
| Elon | 12 | 15 | .444 | 8.5 | 7 |
| Furman | 11 | 15 | .423 | 9 | 8 |
| UNC Greensboro | 8 | 16 | .333 | 11 | 9 |
| The Citadel | 8 | 18 | .308 | 12 | 10 |

== Bracket ==
=== Play-In Round ===
Tuesday, May 20
| Team | R |
|---|---|
| #10 The Citadel | 10 |
| #7 Elon | 7 |

Tuesday, May 20
| Team | R |
|---|---|
| #9 UNC Greensboro | 5 |
| #8 Furman | 6 |
Notes: 11 innings

=== Bracket One ===
First round
1 | Western Carolina | 2
8 | Furman | 3
4 | Georgia Southern | 2
5 | Appalachian State | 3
Lower round 1
1 | Western Carolina | 4
4 | Georgia Southern | 8

Second round
8 | Furman | 3
5 | Appalachian State | 1
Lower final
4 | Georgia Southern | 2
5 | Appalachian State | 1

Semifinals
8 | Furman
4 | Georgia Southern

=== Bracket Two ===
First round
2 | Davidson | 9
10 | The Citadel | 7
3 | Samford | 4
6 | Wofford | 2
Lower round 1
10 | The Citadel | 2
6 | Wofford | 4

Second round
2 | Davidson | 3
3 | Samford | 7
Lower final
2 | Davidson | 7
6 | Wofford | 10

Semifinals
3 | Samford
6 | Wofford

=== Final ===
Sunday, May 25
| Team | R |
|---|---|
| Samford | 3 |
| Georgia Southern | 4 |

== All-Tournament Team ==
The following players were named to the All-Tournament Team. Georgia Southern reliever Jason Richman, one of four Eagles selected, was named Most Outstanding Player.

| Pos. | Name | Team |
|---|---|---|
| SP | Jeffrey Springs | Appalachian State |
| SP | Alex Ledford | Samford |
| RP | Jason Richman | Georgia Southern |
| C | Daniel Gerow | Davidson |
| 1B | Caleb Bryson | Samford |
| 2B | Ben Morgan | Georgia Southern |
| SS | Dalton Busby | Georgia Southern |
| 3B | Michael Pierson | Appalachian State |
| OF | Jake Jones | Furman |
| OF | Aaron Mizell | Georgia Southern |
| OF | Heath Quinn | Samford |
| DH | Alex Abrams | Furman |
