= 2008 Southern Conference baseball tournament =

- Teams: 10
- Format: Double-elimination tournament
- Finals site: Joseph P. Riley Jr. Park; Charleston, South Carolina
- Champions: Elon (1st title)
- Winning coach: Mike Kennedy (1st title)
- MVP: Cory Harrilchak (Elon)
- Attendance: 15,144

2008 Southern Conference baseball standings
	Conf.				Overall
Team	W		L	PCT	W		L	PCT
Elon ‍†‍‡‍^{y}	19	–	8	.704	44	–	18	.710
College of Charleston ‍‍‍	18	–	9	.667	39	–	20	.661
Furman ‍‍‍	17	–	10	.630	33	–	24	.579
Georgia Southern ‍‍‍	16	–	11	.593	33	–	25	.569
UNC Greensboro ‍‍‍	15	–	12	.556	33	–	27	.550
Appalachian State ‍‍‍	14	–	13	.519	32	–	27	.542
Western Carolina ‍‍‍	14	–	13	.519	29	–	28	.509
The Citadel ‍‍‍	12	–	15	.444	28	–	28	.500
Wofford ‍‍‍	6	–	21	.222	24	–	35	.407
Davidson ‍‍‍	4	–	23	.148	12	–	38	.240
† – Conference champion ‡ – SoCon Tournament champion y – Invited to the NCAA tournament As of June 30, 2008; Rankings from Collegiate Baseball

The 2008 Southern Conference baseball tournament was held at Joseph P. Riley Jr. Park in Charleston, South Carolina, from May 20 through 24. Top seeded Elon won the tournament and earned the Southern Conference's automatic bid to the 2008 NCAA Division I baseball tournament. It was Elon's first SoCon tournament win. Elon joined the conference beginning with the 2004 baseball season.

All ten baseball programs in the conference participated in the tournament, with the seventh through tenth place teams playing a single-elimination opening day prior to an 8-team, two bracket, double-elimination tournament.

== Seeding ==
Team	W	L	T	Pct	GB	Seed
Elon	19	8	0	.704	–	1
College of Charleston	18	9	0	.667	1	2
Furman	17	10	0	.630	2	3
Georgia Southern	16	11	0	.593	3	4
UNC Greensboro	15	12	0	.556	4	5
Appalachian State	14	13	0	.519	5	6
Western Carolina	14	13	0	.519	5	7
The Citadel	12	15	0	.444	7	8
Wofford	6	21	0	.222	13	9
Davidson	4	23	0	.148	15	10

== Bracket ==
=== Play-In Round ===
Tuesday, May 20
Team	R
#10 Davidson	10
#7 Western Carolina	11
Notes: Davidson eliminated

Tuesday, May 20
Team	R
#9 Wofford	8
#8 The Citadel	4
Notes: The Citadel eliminated

=== Bracket One ===
First round
7	Western Carolina	4
2	College of Charleston	5
6	Appalachian State	8
3	Furman	10
Lower round 1
7	Western Carolina	5
6	Appalachian State	10

Second round
3	Furman	8
2	College of Charleston	12
Lower final
6	Appalachian State	12
3	Furman	13

Semifinals
2	College of Charleston
3	Furman

=== Bracket Two ===
First round
9	Wofford	12
1	Elon	21
5	UNC Greensboro	9
4	Georgia Southern	21
Lower round 1
5	UNC Greensboro	14
9	Wofford	5

Second round
1	Elon	16
4	Georgia Southern	5
Lower final
4	Georgia Southern	9
5	UNC Greensboro	12

Semifinals
1	Elon
5	UNC Greensboro

=== Final ===
Sunday, May 24
Team	R
#2 College of Charleston	8
#1 Elon	17

== Game summaries ==
=== Play-In Round ===
Tuesday, May 20 12:05 pm
Team	1	2	3	4	5	6	7	8	9	10	11	12	R	H	E
#10 Davidson	0	0	0	0	0	0	0	3	7	0	0	0	10	12	4
#7 Western Carolina	0	0	1	4	4	0	0	1	0	0	0	1	11	16	3
WP: Masters LP: Hunter; Home runs: DAV: None; WCU: Lyons; Attendance: 1,423; Notes: Davidson eliminated Boxscore

Tuesday, May 20 5:44 pm
Team	1	2	3	4	5	6	7	8	9	R	H	E
#9 Wofford	0	0	0	2	2	0	2	0	2	8	13	1
#8 The Citadel	2	0	0	2	0	0	0	0	0	4	9	3
WP: Summers LP: Copenhaver; Home runs: WC: Gilmartin, Kirkley; Cid: None; Attendance: 1,533; Notes: The Citadel eliminated Boxscore

=== Round One ===
Wednesday, May 21 10:06 am
Team	1	2	3	4	5	6	7	8	9	R	H	E
#7 Western Carolina	0	0	0	0	4	0	0	0	0	4	5	0
#2 College of Charleston	0	2	1	0	2	0	0	0	X	5	12	1
WP: Jesse Simpson LP: Tavernier; Home runs: WCU: Lyons; CofC: Sizemore, Tice 2 Attendance: 949; Boxscore

Wednesday, May 21 1:36 pm
Team	1	2	3	4	5	6	7	8	9	10	R	H	E
#6 Appalachian State	0	0	0	1	0	4	0	0	0	3	8	12	1
#3 Furman	0	0	0	1	1	0	3	0	0	5	10	12	2
WP: Karow LP: Jason Rook; Home runs: ASU: Rubenstein, Hubbard, Rodgers; FU: None; Attendance: 887; Boxscore

Wednesday, May 21 5:05 pm
Team	1	2	3	4	5	6	7	8	9	R	H	E
#9 Wofford	0	0	0	2	0	0	6	4	0	12	13	2
#1 Elon	3	1	0	0	2	15	0	0	X	21	17	4
WP: Hensley LP: Cornely; Home runs: WC: None; EU: Harrichak, Tarleton; Attendance: 973; Boxscore

Wednesday, May 21 10:15
Team	1	2	3	4	5	6	7	8	9	R	H	E
#5 UNC Greensboro	0	0	0	4	3	1	1	0	0	9	11	1
#4 Georgia Southern	0	0	6	1	0	4	7	3	X	21	21	1
WP: Eubanks LP: McCall; Home runs: UNCG: Feltes, Snell; GSU: Parker 2 Attendance: 522; Boxscore

=== Round Two ===
Thursday, May 22 10:00 am
Team	1	2	3	4	5	6	7	8	9	R	H	E
#7 Western Carolina	1	0	0	0	0	1	0	3	0	5	10	0
#6 Appalachian State	4	0	4	0	0	0	2	0	X	10	12	0
WP: Josh Dowdy LP: Martin; Home runs: WCU: None; ASU: Towarnicky; Attendance: 657; Notes: Western Carolina eliminated Boxscore

Thursday, May 22 2:00 pm
Team	1	2	3	4	5	6	7	8	9	R	H	E
#5 UNC Greensboro	1	0	4	0	0	4	1	0	4	14	19	1
#9 Wofford	1	0	0	1	0	1	0	2	0	5	8	1
WP: Gilliam LP: Dolinak; Home runs: UNCG: Feltes; WC: Carrier; Attendance: 659; Notes: Wofford eliminated Boxscore

Thursday, May 22 6:00 pm
Team	1	2	3	4	5	6	7	8	9	R	H	E
#3 Furman	0	1	0	7	0	0	0	0	0	8	10	6
#2 College of Charleston	1	5	0	2	0	2	0	2	X	12	12	2
WP: Mike Lynn LP: Lang; Home runs: FU: Hemingway; ASU: None; Attendance: 1,195; Boxscore

Thursday, May 22 10:00 am
Team	1	2	3	4	5	6	7	8	9	R	H	E
#1 Elon	0	1	0	2	2	0	3	0	8	16	21	1
#4 Georgia Southern	0	0	2	0	0	3	0	0	0	5	9	3
WP: Lewter LP: Chisman; Home runs: EU: Harrilchak, Davis, CAustin; GSU: Shehan; Attendance: 723; Boxscore

=== Round Three ===
Friday, May 23 9:02 am
Team	1	2	3	4	5	6	7	8	9	R	H	E
#6 Appalachian State	1	2	2	2	0	5	0	0	0	12	16	2
#3 Furman	3	0	1	0	8	0	0	0	1	13	12	1
WP: Parry LP: Garrett Sherrill; Home runs: ASU: Harrow 2, Towarnicky, Franco 2 FU: Smith; Attendance: 681; Notes: Appalachian State eliminated Boxscore

Friday, May 23 1:00 pm
Team	1	2	3	4	5	6	7	8	9	R	H	E
#4 Georgia Southern	3	0	0	0	0	1	1	2	2	9	14	0
#5 UNC Greensboro	0	0	2	3	0	0	7	0	X	12	15	1
WP: GSmith LP: Eubanks; Home runs: GSU: Wright; UNCG: Feltes, Carrier, Deleo; Attendance: 627; Notes: Georgia Southern eliminated Boxscore

=== Semifinals ===
Saturday, May 24 10:02 am
Team	1	2	3	4	5	6	7	8	9	10	R	H	E
#2 College of Charleston	3	0	0	0	1	2	0	0	4	2	12	15	3
#3 Furman	4	2	0	0	0	0	0	1	3	1	11	15	3
WP: Mike Lynn LP: Parry; Home runs: CofC: Sizemore, Tice, Haywood 2 FU: Harrison; Attendance: 1,443; Notes: Furman eliminated Boxscore

Saturday, May 24 5:00 pm
Team	1	2	3	4	5	6	7	8	9	R	H	E
#1 Elon	2	5	0	3	0	1	1	0	0	12	4	0
#5 UNC Greensboro	0	1	1	0	0	1	0	0	1	4	11	2
WP: Ferrer LP: Martin Sv: JReyes; Home runs: EU: Harrilchak, Davis, Lobacz; UNCG: None; Attendance: 617; Notes: UNC Greensboro eliminated Boxscore

=== Final ===
Sunday, May 24 2:08 pm
Team	1	2	3	4	5	6	7	8	9	R	H	E
#2 College of Charleston	0	0	1	0	0	2	0	5	0	8	8	3
#1 Elon	0	1	0	0	3	5	3	5	X	17	19	4
WP: Harrilchak LP: Jesse Simpson; Home runs: CofC: Haywood; EU: Tarleton; Attendance: 2,255; Notes: Elon wins Boxscore

== All-Tournament Team ==
Position	Player	School
P	Mike Lynn	College of Charleston
C	Dallas Tarleton	Elon
1B	Jay Jackson	Furman
2B	Tim Carrier	UNC Greensboro
SS	Chase Austin	Elon
3B	Bennett Davis	Elon
OF	Stuart Haywood	College of Charleston
OF	Chris Shehan	Georgia Southern
OF	Cory Harrilchak	Elon
DH	Greg Feltes	UNC Greensboro

Walt Nadzak Award, Tournament Most Outstanding Player
Cory Harrilchak
Elon
