= 1999 Southern Conference baseball tournament =

Baseball tournament

- Teams: 8
- Format: Double-elimination tournament
- Finals site: Joseph P. Riley Jr. Park; Charleston, South Carolina
- Champions: The Citadel (5th title)
- Winning coach: Fred Jordan (baseball) (4th title)
- MVP: Rodney Hancock (The Citadel)
- Attendance: 26,187

1999 Southern Conference baseball standings
	Conf.				Overall
Team	W		L	PCT	W		L	PCT
The Citadel ‍†‍‡‍^{y}	24	–	5	.828	41	–	20	.672
College of Charleston ‍‍‍	19	–	10	.655	31	–	24	.564
Western Carolina ‍‍‍	18	–	10	.643	36	–	22	.621
East Tennessee State ‍‍‍	18	–	11	.621	29	–	25	.537
UNC Greensboro ‍‍‍	16	–	12	.571	29	–	26	.527
Georgia Southern ‍‍‍	13	–	15	.464	29	–	29	.500
VMI ‍‍‍	13	–	16	.448	22	–	27	.449
Furman ‍‍‍	13	–	17	.433	22	–	35	.386
Appalachian State ‍‍‍	10	–	20	.333	14	–	38	.269
Davidson ‍‍‍	9	–	21	.300	11	–	37	.229
Wofford ‍‍‍	7	–	23	.233	14	–	36	.280
† – Conference champion ‡ – SoCon Tournament champion y – Invited to the NCAA tournament As of June 30, 1999; Rankings from Collegiate Baseball

The 1999 Southern Conference baseball tournament was held at Joseph P. Riley Jr. Park in Charleston, South Carolina, from May 19 through 22. Top seeded The Citadel won the tournament and earned the Southern Conference's automatic bid to the 1999 NCAA Division I baseball tournament. It was the Bulldogs fifth tournament win.

The tournament used a double-elimination format. Only the top eight teams participate, so Appalachian State, Davidson, and Furman were not in the field.

== Seeding ==
Team	W	L	Pct	GB	Seed
The Citadel	24	5	.828	–	1
College of Charleston	19	10	.655	5	2
Western Carolina	18	10	.643	5.5	3
East Tennessee State	18	11	.621	6	4
UNC Greensboro	16	12	.571	7.5	5
Georgia Southern	13	15	.464	10.5	6
VMI	13	16	.448	11	7
Furman	13	17	.433	12.5	8
Appalachian State	10	20	.333	14.5	
Davidson	9	21	.300	15.5	
Wofford	7	23	.233	17.5	

== Bracket ==
Upper round 1	Upper round 2	Upper final	Final
6	Georgia Southern	8
3	Western Carolina	5
2	College of Charleston	4
6	Georgia Southern	2
7	VMI	4
2	College of Charleston	15
1	The Citadel	4
2	College of Charleston	3
5	UNC Greensboro	7
4	East Tennessee State	1
4	East Tennessee State	5
1	The Citadel	13
8	Furman	0
1	The Citadel	3	3	Western Carolina	3
1	The Citadel	6
Lower round 1	Lower round 2	Lower round 3	Lower final
4	East Tennessee State	5
3	Western Carolina	8	3	Western Carolina	7	2	College of Charleston	2
7	VMI	4	3	Western Carolina	11	3	Western Carolina	3
8	Furman	4
6	Georgia Southern	2
8	Furman	3	8	Furman	10
5	UNC Greensboro	0

== All-Tournament Team ==
Position	Player	School
P	Rodney Hancock	The Citadel
C	Rodney Marmol	College of Charleston
1B	Philip Hartig	The Citadel
2B	Tavy Smalls	The Citadel
3B	Charlie Wands	Western Carolina
SS	Michael Harris	The Citadel
OF	Eric Johnson	Western Carolina
OF	Rusty Swackhamer	East Tennessee State
OF	Josh Edgeworth	College of Charleston
DH	Morgan Frazier	Western Carolina

Walt Nadzak Award, Tournament Most Outstanding Player
Rodney Hancock
The Citadel
