= Chris McGuiness =

American baseball player (born 1988)

- First baseman
- Born: April 11, 1988 (age 38); Charleston, South Carolina, U.S.
- Batted: Left Threw: Left

MLB debut
- June 7, 2013, for the Texas Rangers

Last MLB appearance
- June 17, 2013, for the Texas Rangers

MLB statistics
- Batting average: .176
- Home runs: 0
- Runs batted in: 1
- Stats at Baseball Reference

Teams
- Texas Rangers (2013)

Christopher Ryan McGuiness (born April 11, 1988) is an American former professional baseball first baseman. He played in Major League Baseball (MLB) for the Texas Rangers in 2013.

== Career ==
McGuiness attended James Island High School in James Island, South Carolina, and The Citadel, The Military College of South Carolina. He played college baseball for The Citadel Bulldogs baseball team.

=== Boston Red Sox ===
The Boston Red Sox drafted him in the 13th round of the 2009 Major League Baseball draft. He signed, foregoing his senior season.

=== Texas Rangers ===
During the 2010 season, the Red Sox traded McGuiness with Román Méndez to the Texas Rangers for Jarrod Saltalamacchia. After the 2012 season, McGuiness competed in the Arizona Fall League, and was named the circuit's most valuable player.

=== Cleveland Indians ===
The Cleveland Indians selected McGuiness in the 2012 Rule 5 draft. In spring training, the Indians tested McGuiness in the outfield to increase his versatility.

=== Return To Rangers ===
Rather than add McGuiness on their active roster, the Indians returned McGuiness to the Rangers at the end of spring training. McGuinness was the everyday first baseman for the Frisco RoughRiders of the Double–A Texas League for the 2012 season, hitting .268 with 23 home runs and 77 RBIs in 123 games.

McGuiness started the 2013 season with the Round Rock Express of the Triple–A Pacific Coast League, and the Rangers promoted him to the major leagues on June 6 when first baseman Mitch Moreland was placed on the 15-day disabled list. He made his major league debut on June 7. McGuiness played in 10 games for the Rangers, collecting six hits and one run batted in. Moreland returned to the Rangers on June 18, and the Rangers demoted McGuiness to Round Rock.

The Rangers designated McGuiness for assignment after the 2013 season to make room on their 40-man roster for Shin-Soo Choo.

=== Pittsburgh Pirates ===
The Rangers traded McGuiness to the Pittsburgh Pirates for Miles Mikolas. The Pirates optioned McGuiness to the Indianapolis Indians of the Triple–A International League out of spring training. After the completion of the Triple–A season, the Pirates designated McGuiness for assignment so that they could promote John Holdzkom to the major leagues. McGuiness elected free agency in October 2014.

=== Philadelphia Phillies ===
On December 22, 2014, he signed a minor league contract with the Philadelphia Phillies, receiving an invitation to spring training. He became a free agent after the 2015 season.

== Personal life ==
McGuiness has an older brother, Brian, who also played baseball at James Island and at the College of Charleston.

== See also ==
- Rule 5 draft results
