= James Reeves (baseball) =

American baseball player (born 1993)

- Pitcher
- Born: June 7, 1993 (age 32); Summerville, South Carolina, U.S.
- Bats: Right Throws: Left

James Earle Reeves (born June 7, 1993) is an American former professional baseball pitcher.

Reeves attended Ashley Ridge High School in Summerville, South Carolina, and The Citadel, The Military College of South Carolina, where he played college baseball for The Citadel Bulldogs. In 2015, he was named the Southern Conference Pitcher of the Year. After ending his playing days, he coached for one season at Oceanside Collegiate Academy in Mount Pleasant, South Carolina. Reeves became pitching coach at The Citadel, beginning his tenure with the 2025 season.

== Career ==
=== New York Yankees ===
The New York Yankees selected Reeves in the tenth round, with the 303rd overall selection, of the 2015 MLB draft. He made his professional debut in 2015 with the Staten Island Yankees where he pitched to a 1–1 record and 3.08 ERA in 13 games, and began the 2016 season with the Charleston RiverDogs. He received promotions to the Tampa Yankees and the Trenton Thunder during the season. In 32 total games between the three teams, he posted a 6–2 record with a 2.22 ERA and a 0.91 WHIP. In 2017, he played for both Tampa and Trenton, posting a combined 1.96 ERA with 51 strikeouts in 46 innings pitched between both teams.

Reeves split the 2018 season between the Triple-A Scranton/Wilkes-Barre RailRiders and Double-A Trenton, pitching to a cumulative 2-2 record and 2.88 ERA with 72 strikeouts in 56.1 innings of work. The following year, Reeves split time between Double-A Trenton and High-A Tampa, posting a stellar 7-2 record and 1.87 ERA with 83 strikeouts in 67.1 innings pitched. Reeves did not play a minor league game in 2020 due to the cancellation of the minor league season because of the COVID-19 pandemic.

=== San Diego Padres ===
On January 6, 2021, Reeves was traded to the San Diego Padres in exchange for Greg Allen. Reeves made 40 appearances split between the Triple-A El Paso Chihuahuas and the Double-A San Antonio Missions, recording a 3-0 record and 5.65 ERA with 75 strikeouts in 51.0 innings pitched.

=== Chicago Dogs ===
On May 3, 2022, Reeves signed with the Chicago Dogs of the American Association of Professional Baseball. Reeves pitched in 22 games for the Dogs, logging a 1-1 record and 3.42 ERA with 35 strikeouts in 26.1 innings pitched, and was named an All-Star for the team.

In 2023, Reeves appeared in 2 games for Chicago, surrendering 5 runs (3 earned) on 3 hits and 3 walks with 3 strikeouts in 2.0 innings pitched. He was released by the Dogs on May 18, 2023.

=== Kane County Cougars ===
On May 19, 2023, Reeves signed with the Kane County Cougars of the American Association of Professional Baseball. In 10 games for the Cougars, he logged a 5.63 ERA with 9 strikeouts in 8.0 innings pitched. On July 15, Reeves was released by the Cougars.
