= 2010 Southern Conference baseball tournament =

- Teams: 8
- Format: Double-elimination tournament
- Finals site: Joseph P. Riley Jr. Park; Charleston, South Carolina
- Champions: The Citadel (8th title)
- Winning coach: Fred Jordan (7th title)
- MVP: Justin Mackert (The Citadel)
- Attendance: 21,511

2010 Southern Conference baseball standings
	Conf.				Overall
Team	W		L	PCT	W		L	PCT
The Citadel ‍†‍‡‍^{y}	24	–	6	.800	43	–	22	.662
#29 College of Charleston ^{y} ‍‍‍	22	–	8	.733	44	–	19	.698
Georgia Southern ‍‍‍	19	–	11	.633	34	–	24	.586
Elon ‍‍‍^{y}	19	–	11	.633	38	–	24	.613
Samford ‍‍‍	17	–	12	.586	31	–	25	.554
Western Carolina ‍‍‍	16	–	13	.552	37	–	21	.638
Appalachian State ‍‍‍	14	–	14	.500	38	–	18	.679
Furman ‍‍‍	11	–	19	.367	19	–	37	.339
Wofford ‍‍‍	9	–	21	.300	17	–	38	.309
UNC Greensboro ‍‍‍	7	–	23	.233	20	–	33	.377
Davidson ‍‍‍	5	–	25	.167	19	–	32	.373
† – Conference champion ‡ – SoCon Tournament champion y – Invited to the NCAA tournament As of June 30, 2010; Rankings from Collegiate Baseball

The 2010 Southern Conference baseball tournament was held at Joseph P. Riley Jr. Park in Charleston, South Carolina, from May 26 through 30. Top seeded The Citadel won the tournament and earned the Southern Conference's automatic bid to the 2010 NCAA Division I baseball tournament. It was The Citadel's eighth SoCon tournament win.

The tournament used a double-elimination format. Only the top eight teams participate, so Wofford, UNC Greensboro, and Davidson were not in the field.

== Seeding ==
Team	W	L	T	Pct	GB	Seed
The Citadel	24	6	0	.800	–	1
College of Charleston	22	8	0	.733	2	2
Georgia Southern	19	11	0	.633	5	3
Elon	19	11	0	.633	5	4
Samford	17	12	0	.586	6.5	5
Western Carolina	16	13	1	.550	7.5	6
Appalachian State	14	14	1	.500	9.5	7
Furman	11	19	0	.697	13	8
Wofford	9	21	0	.300	15	
UNC Greensboro	7	23	0	.233	17	
Davidson	5	25	0	.167	19	

== Brackets ==
=== Bracket one ===
First round
7	Appalachian State	11
2	College of Charleston	12
6	Western Carolina	11
3	Georgia Southern	4
Lower round 1
3	Georgia Southern	2
7	Appalachian State	6

Second round
2	College of Charleston	6
6	Western Carolina	7
Lower final
7	Appalachian State	10
2	College of Charleston	6

Semifinals
6	Western Carolina
7	Appalachian State

=== Bracket two ===
First round
8	Furman	5
1	The Citadel	9
5	Samford	0
4	Elon	1
Lower round 1
5	Samford	13
8	Furman	10

Second round
1	The Citadel	6
4	Elon	3
Lower final
4	Elon	7
5	Samford	4

Semifinals
4	Elon
1	The Citadel

=== Final ===
Sunday, May 30
Team	R
#1 The Citadel	10
#6 Western Carolina	3

== Game summaries ==
=== Round One ===
Wednesday, May 26 9:09 am
Team	1	2	3	4	5	6	7	8	9	10	11	R	H	E
#7 Appalachian State	1	1	0	0	0	3	3	2	0	0	1	11	16	2
#2 College of Charleston	1	3	2	0	1	0	1	0	2	0	2	12	15	2
WP: Owen Brittle LP: Chris Patterson; Home runs: ASU: Crespo; CofC: Bergman, Rakar, Brewer; Attendance: 1,053; Boxscore

Wednesday, May 26 2:10 pm
Team	1	2	3	4	5	6	7	8	9	R	H	E
#6 Western Carolina	0	1	2	3	3	1	0	1	0	11	14	0
#3 Georgia Southern	1	0	0	1	0	0	0	0	2	4	12	2
WP: Matt Benedict LP: Jake Brown Sv: Andrew Jones; Home runs: WCU: Johns, Dullnig; GSU: Roache; Attendance: 732; Boxscore

Wednesday, May 26 6:11 pm
Team	1	2	3	4	5	6	7	8	9	R	H	E
#8 Furman	0	0	0	1	0	1	2	1	0	5	11	0
#1 The Citadel	2	0	0	0	2	0	4	1	X	9	11	1
WP: Asher Wojciechowski LP: Ian Parry; Home runs: FU: Cole, Jenkins; Cid: None; Attendance: 2,835; Boxscore

Thursday, May 27 12:30 am
Team	1	2	3	4	5	6	7	8	9	R	H	E
#5 Samford	0	0	0	0	0	0	0	0	0	0	6	2
#4 Elon	0	0	0	0	0	0	0	0	1	1	7	0
WP: Jimmy Reyes LP: Andrew Jones; Attendance: 575; Boxscore

=== Round Two ===
Thursday, May 27 9:00 am
Team	1	2	3	4	5	6	7	8	9	R	H	E
#3 Georgia Southern	0	0	0	0	1	0	1	0	0	2	9	2
#7 Appalachian State	0	2	0	0	0	1	3	0	X	6	7	0
WP: Matt Andress LP: Dexter Bobo; Home runs: GSU: Wirnsberger; ASU: Alessandria; Attendance: 485; Notes: Georgia Southern eliminated Boxscore

Thursday, May 27 1:03 pm
Team	1	2	3	4	5	6	7	8	9	R	H	E
#5 Samford	4	4	2	0	1	0	1	1	0	13	17	3
#8 Furman	0	0	1	2	0	6	0	1	0	10	16	1
WP: Matt Andress LP: Dexter Bobo; Home runs: SU: Hayes (2); FU: Owens, Miller; Attendance: 536; Notes: Furman eliminated Boxscore

Thursday, May 27 5:06 pm
Team	1	2	3	4	5	6	7	8	9	10	R	H	E
#1 The Citadel	1	0	0	0	0	0	0	0	2	3	6	9	0
#4 Elon	0	0	1	1	0	0	0	0	1	0	3	8	6
WP: Drew Mahaffey LP: Thomas Girdwood; Home runs: Cid: None; EU: Riddle; Attendance: 3,093; Boxscore

Thursday, May 27 5:06 pm
Team	1	2	3	4	5	6	7	8	9	10	11	12	R	H	E
#2 College of Charleston	0	0	0	3	3	0	0	0	0	0	0	0	6	10	3
#6 Western Carolina	0	0	0	0	0	2	1	1	2	0	0	1	7	9	2
WP: Brandon Johnson LP: Dre Watts; Home runs: CofC: None; WCU: Johns; Attendance: 694; Boxscore

=== Round Three ===
Friday, May 28 3:02 pm
Team	1	2	3	4	5	6	7	8	9	R	H	E
#7 Appalachian State	1	2	2	2	1	0	2	0	0	10	13	1
#2 College of Charleston	0	3	3	0	0	0	0	0	0	6	12	4
WP: Ryan Arrowood LP: Christian Powell Sv: Taylor Miller; Home runs: ASU: None; CofC: Blake, Rodriguez; Attendance: 769; Notes: College of Charleston eliminated Boxscore

Friday, May 28 6:59 pm
Team	1	2	3	4	5	6	7	8	9	R	H	E
#4 Elon	0	1	0	1	0	0	1	0	4	7	8	2
#5 Samford	0	0	1	0	0	0	2	0	1	4	7	1
WP: Jim Stokes LP: Lex Rutledge Sv: Kyle Webb; Home runs: EU: None; SU: Adams, Scott; Attendance: 647; Notes: Samford eliminated Boxscore

=== Round Four ===
Saturday, May 29 9:02 am
Team	1	2	3	4	5	6	7	8	9	R	H	E
#6 Western Carolina	0	2	0	0	0	0	0	0	0	2	6	1
#7 Appalachian State	0	0	1	0	1	0	0	0	1	3	8	1
WP: Chris Patterson LP: Jason Sullivan; Attendance: 611; Boxscore

Saturday, May 29 1:00 pm
Team	1	2	3	4	5	6	7	8	9	10	R	H	E
#4 Elon	0	0	0	1	0	0	3	0	1	0	5	10	2
#1 The Citadel	0	1	0	0	0	1	0	0	3	1	6	10	1
WP: Drew Mahaffey LP: Mitch Conner; Home runs: EU: None; Cid: Felder; Attendance: 4,033; Notes: Elon eliminated Boxscore

Saturday, May 29 5:00 pm
Team	1	2	3	4	5	6	7	8	9	R	H	E
#7 Appalachian State	1	0	3	0	1	0	0	0	1	6	11	0
#6 Western Carolina	0	1	2	2	0	1	0	0	1	7	12	0
WP: Brandon Johnson LP: Chris Patterson; Home runs: ASU: Towarnicky; WCU: Goulder; Attendance: 553; Notes: Appalachian State eliminated Boxscore

=== Final ===
Sunday, May 30 2:05 pm
Team	1	2	3	4	5	6	7	8	9	R	H	E
#1 The Citadel	5	2	0	2	1	0	0	0	0	10	12	1
#6 Western Carolina	0	0	1	1	1	0	0	0	0	3	7	2
WP: Asher Wojciechowski LP: Matt Benedict; Attendance: 4,895; Notes: The Citadel wins Boxscore

== All-Tournament Team ==
Position	Player	School
SP	Asher Wojciechowski	The Citadel
SP	Jimmy Reyes	Elon
RP	Brandon Johnson	Western Carolina
C	Ollie Goulder	Western Carolina
1B	Justin Mackert	The Citadel
2B	Wes Hobson	Appalachian State
SS	Jamie Holler	College of Charleston
3B	Hector Crespo	Appalachian State
OF	Chris Alessandria	Appalachian State
OF	William Ladd	The Citadel
OF	Matt Johns	Western Carolina
DH	Brad Felder	The Citadel

Walt Nadzak Award, Tournament Most Outstanding Player
Justin Mackert
The Citadel
