= Greg Allen (baseball) =

American baseball player (born 1993)

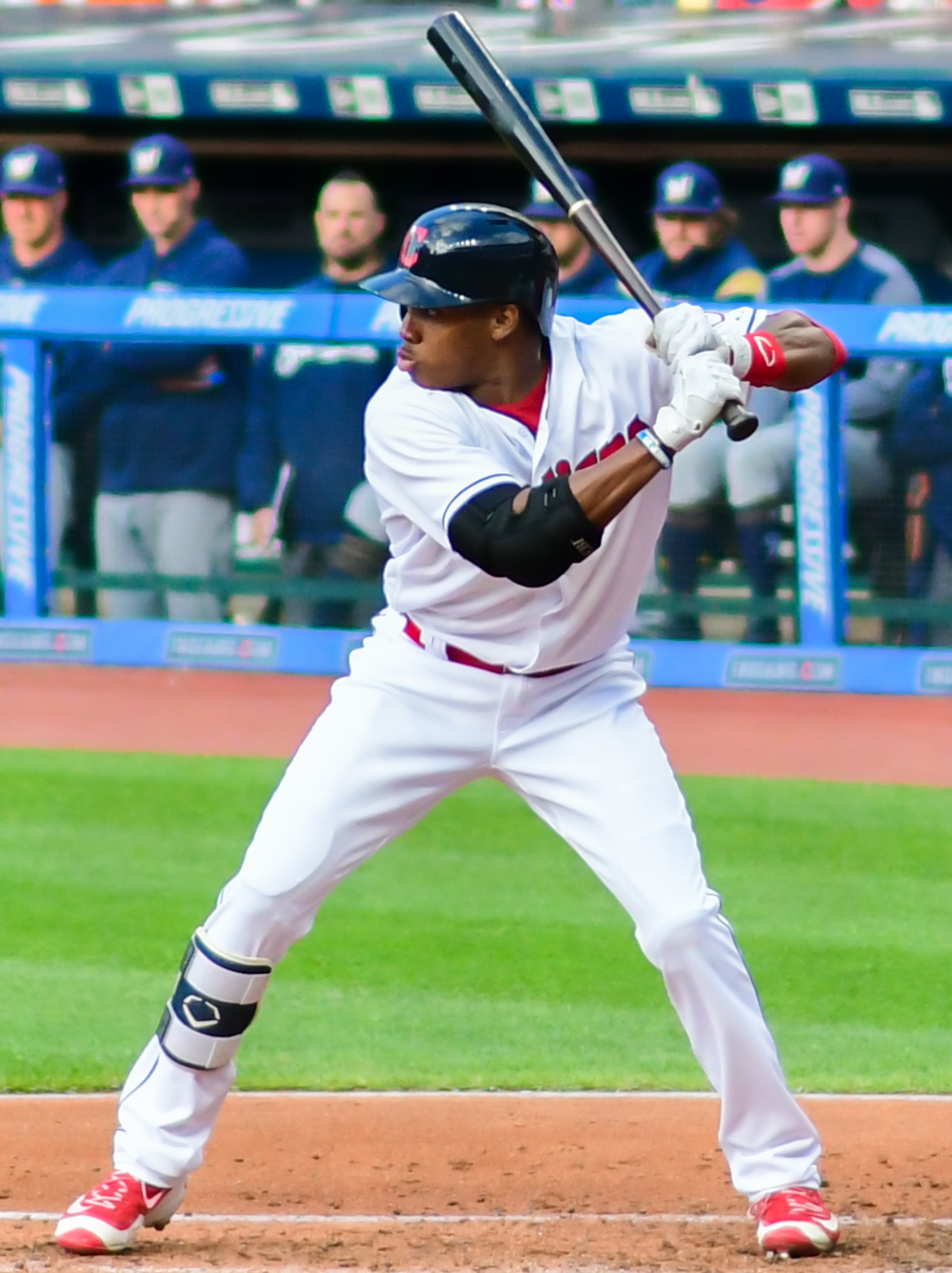
- Allen with the Cleveland Indians in 2018

Saraperos de Saltillo – No. 25
- Outfielder
- Born: March 15, 1993 (age 33); San Diego, California, U.S.
- Bats: Switch Throws: Right

MLB debut
- September 1, 2017, for the Cleveland Indians

MLB statistics (through August 15, 2025)
- Batting average: .227
- Home runs: 11
- Runs batted in: 68
- Stats at Baseball Reference

Teams
- Cleveland Indians (2017–2020); San Diego Padres (2020); New York Yankees (2021); Pittsburgh Pirates (2022); New York Yankees (2023); Baltimore Orioles (2025)

Gregory Lomack Allen (born March 15, 1993) is an American professional baseball outfielder for the Saraperos de Saltillo of the Mexican League. He has previously played in Major League Baseball (MLB) for the Cleveland Indians, San Diego Padres, New York Yankees, Pittsburgh Pirates, and Baltimore Orioles.

== Amateur career ==
Allen attended Hilltop High School in Chula Vista, California. He then attended San Diego State University, where he played college baseball for three seasons for the San Diego State Aztecs. In 2013, he played collegiate summer baseball with the Orleans Firebirds of the Cape Cod Baseball League.

== Professional career ==
=== Cleveland Indians ===
The Cleveland Indians selected Allen in the sixth round of the 2014 MLB draft. After signing with Cleveland, Allen was assigned to the Mahoning Valley Scrappers and spent the whole 2014 season there, batting .244 with 19 runs batted in (RBI) and 30 stolen bases in 57 games played. In 2015, he played for the Lake County Captains where he slashed .273/.368/.382 with seven home runs, 45 RBIs, and 43 stolen bases in 123 games. He also played in three games for the Lynchburg Hillcats at the end of the season.

In 2016, Allen played for Lynchburg before he was promoted to the Akron RubberDucks. In 129 total games between the two teams, he batted .295 with seven home runs, 44 RBIs, 45 stolen bases, and an .830 OPS. After the season, the Indians assigned Allen to the Mesa Solar Sox of the Arizona Fall League. He was reported to be involved in a trade to the Milwaukee Brewers for Jonathan Lucroy; however, the trade fell apart after Lucroy refused to waive his no-trade clause. Allen began the 2017 season with Akron.

The Indians promoted him to the major leagues on September 1, 2017. In 71 games for Akron prior to his promotion he was batting .264 with two home runs, 24 RBIs, and 21 stolen bases. On September 7, Allen hit his first MLB home run. Allen began the 2018 season with the Columbus Clippers. On May 27, Allen hit his first major league walk-off home run against the Astros in the 14th inning. On September 23, 2018, Allen hit a base hit in the bottom of the 11th inning against the Boston Red Sox for the Indians to walk off. Allen ended the season with a .257 batting average and 21 stolen bases.

=== San Diego Padres ===
On August 31, 2020, the Indians traded Allen, along with Mike Clevinger and Matt Waldron, to the San Diego Padres in exchange for Austin Hedges, Josh Naylor, Cal Quantrill, and minor league players Gabriel Arias, Owen Miller, and Joey Cantillo. He played in one game for San Diego before they optioned him to their alternate training site. On December 31, 2020, Allen was designated for assignment by the Padres following the signing of Ha-seong Kim.

=== New York Yankees ===
On January 6, 2021, the Padres traded Allen to the New York Yankees in exchange for James Reeves. On February 23, 2021, Allen was designated for assignment by the Yankees after the Justin Wilson signing was made official. On March 1, Allen was outrighted and invited to spring training as a non-roster invitee. He was assigned to the Triple-A Scranton/Wilkes-Barre RailRiders to begin the season. When the Yankees had an outbreak of COVID-19, the Yankees selected Allen to the major leagues on July 16. Allen played in 15 games for the Yankees, hitting .270 with no home runs and two RBIs. On August 5, Allen was returned to Triple-A Scranton and removed from the 40-man roster. The Yankees added Allen to their roster for the 2021 American League Wild Card Game.

=== Pittsburgh Pirates ===
On November 5, 2021, Allen was claimed off waivers by the Pittsburgh Pirates. In an April 3, 2022, game against the Tampa Bay Rays during spring training, Allen tweaked his hamstring. He was placed on the 60-day injured list four days later with a left hamstring strain. He was activated from the injured list on July 22. On September 26, Allen was designated for assignment. He cleared waivers and was sent outright to the Triple–A Indianapolis Indians on September 29. Allen elected free agency following the season on October 6.

=== Boston Red Sox ===
On January 11, 2023, Allen signed a minor-league contract with the Boston Red Sox. He was assigned to the Triple–A Worcester Red Sox to begin the year. He played in 37 games for Worcester, batting .250/.407/.388 with 2 home runs, 15 RBI, and 23 stolen bases.

=== New York Yankees (second stint) ===
On May 19, 2023, Allen was traded to the Yankees in exchange for minor-league pitcher Diego Hernández and cash considerations, marking his second stint in New York. Allen was selected to the Yankees' active roster the next day, after Aaron Hicks was designated for assignment. On June 9, it was announced that Allen would be out six–to–eight weeks due to a right hip flexor strain. He was activated from the injured list on July 23. In 22 games for the Yankees, he hit .217/.333/.478 with 1 home run, 1 RBI, and 3 stolen bases. On August 22, Allen was designated for assignment following the promotion of Everson Pereira. Two days later, Allen elected free agency.

=== Milwaukee Brewers ===
On August 31, 2023, Allen signed a minor league contract with the Milwaukee Brewers organization. In 8 games for the Triple–A Nashville Sounds, he went 7–for–32 (.219) with one RBI and three stolen bases. On September 17, Allen was released by Milwaukee.

=== New York Yankees (third stint) ===
On January 30, 2024, Allen signed a new minor league contract with the Yankees. In 61 appearances split between the Double-A Somerset Patriots and Triple-A Scranton/Wilkes-Barre RailRiders, Allen slashed .223/.335/.351 with three home runs, 22 RBI, and 13 stolen bases. Allen elected free agency following the season on November 4.

=== Chicago Cubs ===
On February 21, 2025, Allen signed a minor league contract with the Chicago Cubs. In 32 appearances for the Triple-A Iowa Cubs, he batted .312/.425/.473 with two home runs, 14 RBI, and five stolen bases. Allen was released by the Cubs organization on June 3. On June 10, Allen re-signed with Chicago on a new minor league contract. He was released a second time on August 4.

=== Baltimore Orioles ===
On August 8, 2025, Allen signed a major league contract with the Baltimore Orioles. In seven appearances for Baltimore, he went 0-for-14 with one run scored. Allen was designated for assignment by the Orioles on August 16. He declined an outright assignment to the Triple-A Norfolk Tides on August 19, and elected free agency.

=== Toros de Tijuana ===
On March 1, 2026, Allen signed with the Toros de Tijuana of the Mexican League. In 13 appearances for Tijuana, Allen batted .229/.325/.400 with one home run and four RBI.

=== Saraperos de Saltillo ===
On May 29, 2026, Allen was loaned to the Saraperos de Saltillo of the Mexican League for the remainder of the 2026 season.
