= George C. Rogers =

American sports coach (1889–1964)

Biographical details
- Born: October 9, 1889; Charleston, South Carolina, U.S.
- Died: October 22, 1964 (aged 75); Charleston, South Carolina, U.S.

Coaching career (HC unless noted)

Football
- 1913–1915: The Citadel
- 1919: The Citadel

Baseball
- 1914–1915: The Citadel
- 1921–1924: The Citadel

Head coaching record
- Overall: 14–16–3 (football); 26–36 (baseball)

George Calvin Rogers Sr. (October 9, 1889 – October 22, 1964) was an American football and baseball coach. He was the sixth head football coach at The Citadel, serving for four seasons, from 1913 to 1915 and again in 1919, compiling a record of 14–16–3. He also served as head baseball coach in 1914 and 1915 and resumed the position from 1921 through 1924.

Rogers graduated from The Citadel in 1910, serving as team captain in football, baseball and track, and earning a total of 12 varsity letters. He also coached at the Georgia Military Academy and at high schools in Charleston.

Rogers later served as superintendent of Charleston, South Carolina's public school system, from 1946 until retiring in June 1955. Rogers died on October 22, 1964, at his home in Charleston.

== Head coaching record ==
=== Football ===
Year	Team	Overall	Conference	Standing	Bowl/playoffs
The Citadel Bulldogs (Southern Intercollegiate Athletic Association) (1913–1915)
1913	The Citadel	3–4–2	0–2		
1914	The Citadel	2–5	0–3		
1915	The Citadel	5–3	2–3		
The Citadel Bulldogs (Southern Intercollegiate Athletic Association) (1919)
1919	The Citadel	4–4–1	2–4–1		
The Citadel:		14–16–3	4–12–1		
Total:		14–16–3			

=== Baseball ===
Record table
Season	Team	Overall	Postseason
The Citadel (Independent) (1914–1915)
1914	The Citadel	7–5	
1915	The Citadel	5–4	
The Citadel:		12–9	
The Citadel (Independent) (1921–1924)
1921	The Citadel	2–7	
1922	The Citadel	6–6	
1923	The Citadel	3–8	
1924	The Citadel	3–6	
The Citadel:		14–27	
Total:		26–36	
National champion Postseason invitational champion Conference regular season champion Conference regular season and conference tournament champion Division regular season champion Division regular season and conference tournament champion Conference tournament champion
