= Dallas McPherson =

American baseball player (born 1980)

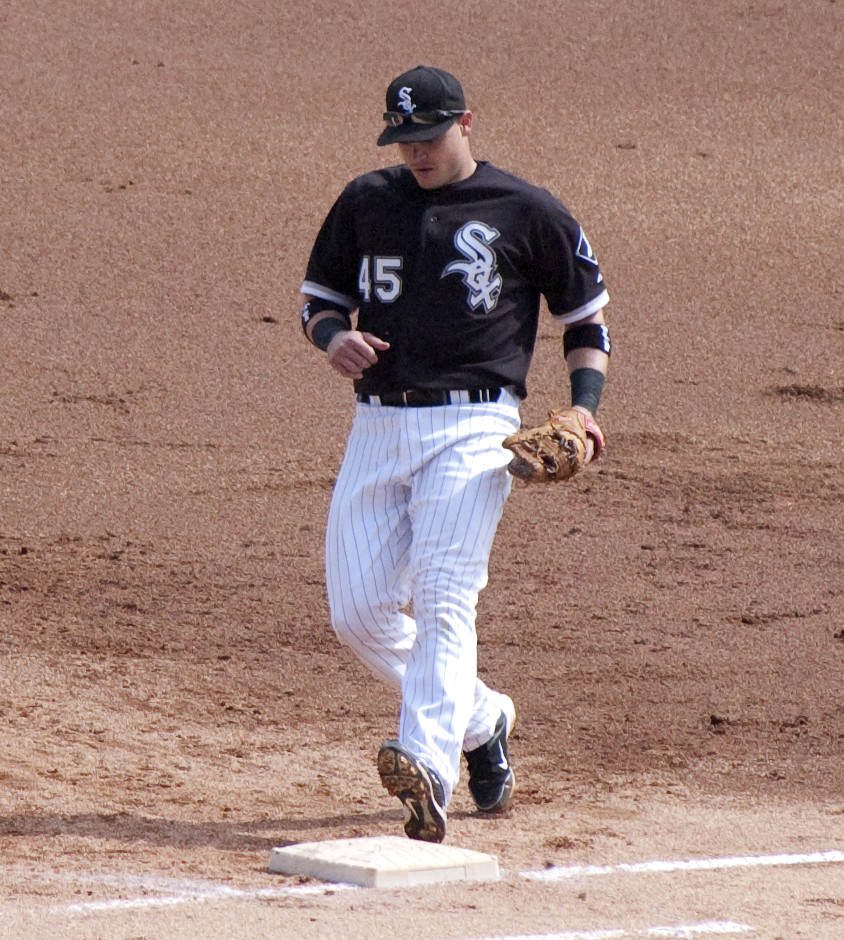
- McPherson with the Chicago White Sox in 2011
- Third baseman / First baseman
- Born: July 23, 1980 (age 46); Greensboro, North Carolina, U.S.
- Batted: Left Threw: Right

MLB debut
- September 10, 2004, for the Anaheim Angels

Last MLB appearance
- May 29, 2011, for the Chicago White Sox

MLB statistics
- Batting average: .241
- Home runs: 18
- Runs batted in: 45
- Stats at Baseball Reference

Teams
- Anaheim Angels / Los Angeles Angels of Anaheim (2004–2006); Florida Marlins (2008); Chicago White Sox (2011)

Dallas Lyle McPherson (born July 23, 1980) is an American former professional baseball third baseman and current minor league coach. He played in Major League Baseball (MLB) for the Anaheim Angels / Los Angeles Angels of Anaheim, Florida Marlins, and Chicago White Sox.

== Amateur career ==
=== High school ===
McPherson played at Randleman High School in Randleman, North Carolina. He was selected by the Atlanta Braves in the 44th round (1323rd overall) of the 1998 First-Year Player Draft, but chose to play college baseball instead.

=== College ===
McPherson attended The Citadel, where he played college baseball from 1998 to 2001. In 2000, he played collegiate summer baseball with the Cotuit Kettleers of the Cape Cod Baseball League. He was the second round draft pick (57th overall) of the Anaheim Angels in the 2001 First-Year Player Draft.

== Professional career ==
=== Anaheim/Los Angeles Angels ===
In 2002, McPherson played for the Angels affiliate the Cedar Rapids Kernels. He ended the season with a .277 batting average with 15 home runs with 30 stolen bases and led the team with 88 RBIs and 78 bases-on-balls. He was the Angels minor league player of the year, Baseball America minor league player of the year and California League all-star in 2003, when he hit .308 with 18 homers for the A+ Rancho Cucamonga Quakes. Midway through his 2004 season, he shot up the ranks from Double-A minor league affiliate Arkansas Travelers to the Triple-A Salt Lake Stingers (now Salt Lake Bees).

After repeating as the Angels and Baseball America's minor league player of the year in 2004 (.313 with 20 homers for Salt Lake), McPherson was a September call-up by the Angels to fill their 40-man expanded roster. He made his Major League debut on September 10, 2004, against the Chicago White Sox as a pinch runner. His first hit was a double to left field off of Ryan Franklin of the Seattle Mariners on September 20. With third baseman Troy Glaus limited to the designated hitter role due to a shoulder injury, McPherson started 11 games down the stretch beginning on September 20 and was the Angels' starting third baseman in their playoff series versus the Boston Red Sox.

His rookie season in 2005 started out sluggishly, with his batting average usually around or below the Mendoza Line in April. Approximately one-third into the season, McPherson's bat heated up and he began hitting like he had been projected to do, including knocking in a pair of game-winning home runs in a series against the Kansas City Royals. His season was truncated by a hip injury, however. He underwent surgery in August 2005 to remove bone spurs.

Entering spring training in 2006, McPherson was expected to compete to be the Angels' starting third baseman. However, he did not hit well during the exhibition season, and that job fell to Chone Figgins, leaving no role on the team for McPherson. As a result, McPherson began the 2006 campaign in the minor leagues. After re-discovering his home run stroke at Salt Lake, the Angels called McPherson back to the active roster in May.

McPherson spent the entirety of the 2007 season on the disabled list after choosing to have back surgery to fuse two vertebrate in his back. McPherson was not offered a new contract by the Angels and became a free agent on December 12, 2007.

=== Florida Marlins ===
He signed a one-year deal with the Florida Marlins on January 31, 2008. Playing for the Triple-A Albuquerque Isotopes, he batted .275 with 42 home runs and 98 RBI. His 42 home runs led the minor leagues in 2008. He was called up on September 1, 2008 and had two hits in 11 at-bats.

On March 31, 2009, McPherson was released by the Marlins.

=== San Francisco Giants ===
On April 11, 2009 McPherson was signed to a minor league contract by the San Francisco Giants. However, he never played a game for any team in the Giants system in 2009 due to recurring back problems.

=== Oakland Athletics ===
On November 20, 2009 McPherson was signed to a minor league contract with the Oakland Athletics, with an invitation to spring training; He was expected to compete for the starting 3rd base position. But with more injury problems, Mc Pherson found himself playing with the Oakland A's Pacific Coast League affiliate, the Sacramento River Cats. In 84 games, he hit .267 with 22 home runs and 75 RBI.

=== Chicago White Sox ===
McPherson signed a minor league contract with the Chicago White Sox on November 17, 2010. He began the season in the minors with the Charlotte Knights. He had his contract purchased by the White Sox on May 17, 2011 but was designated for assignment on May 30 after only playing in 11 games and hitting .133.

On August 2, 2012, McPherson was released by the White Sox. He was hitting .253 with 12 HR and 47 RBI in 61 games with Charlotte.

=== Pittsburgh Pirates ===
McPherson signed with the Pittsburgh Pirates in August 2012. In 22 games with the Indianapolis Indians, he hit .299.

=== Los Angeles Dodgers ===
On December 21, 2012, he signed a minor league contract with the Los Angeles Dodgers. He was released on March 20, 2013.

=== York Revolution ===
On May 28, 2013, McPherson signed with the York Revolution of the Atlantic League of Professional Baseball. He was released on June 1, 2013. In 3 games he went 4-14 (.286) with 0 home runs and 1 RBI.

== Coaching ==
On January 10, 2018, McPherson was announced as the manager of the Short Season-A Vancouver Canadians. A year later, he was promoted to the Single-A Lansing Lugnuts.
