= The Citadel Bulldogs baseball =

The Citadel Bulldogs
- 2026 The Citadel Bulldogs baseball team
- Founded: 1899; 127 years ago
- University: The Citadel
- Athletic director: Art Chase
- Head coach: Russell Triplett (2nd season)
- Conference: Southern
- Location: Charleston, South Carolina
- Home stadium: Joseph P. Riley Jr. Park (capacity: 6,000)
- Nickname: Bulldogs
- Colors: Infantry blue and white

College World Series appearances
- 1990

NCAA regional champions
- 1990

NCAA tournament appearances
- 1960, 1975, 1979, 1982, 1983, 1990, 1994, 1995, 1998, 1999, 2001, 2004, 2010, 2026

Conference tournament champions
- 1990, 1994, 1995, 1998, 1999, 2001, 2004, 2010, 2026

Conference regular season champions
- 1960, 1971, 1975, 1979, 1982, 1983, 1990, 1991, 1995, 1999, 2000, 2002, 2010

The Citadel Bulldogs baseball team represents The Citadel in college baseball. They are classified as NCAA Division I and play in the Southern Conference. The Bulldogs are led by Russell Triplett, who coached his first season in 2025. They made their one appearance in the College World Series in 1990. They are the first and, through 2025, only military school to appear in the College World Series. The Citadel has won nine Southern Conference baseball tournament titles and produced 11 major league players.

== Facilities ==
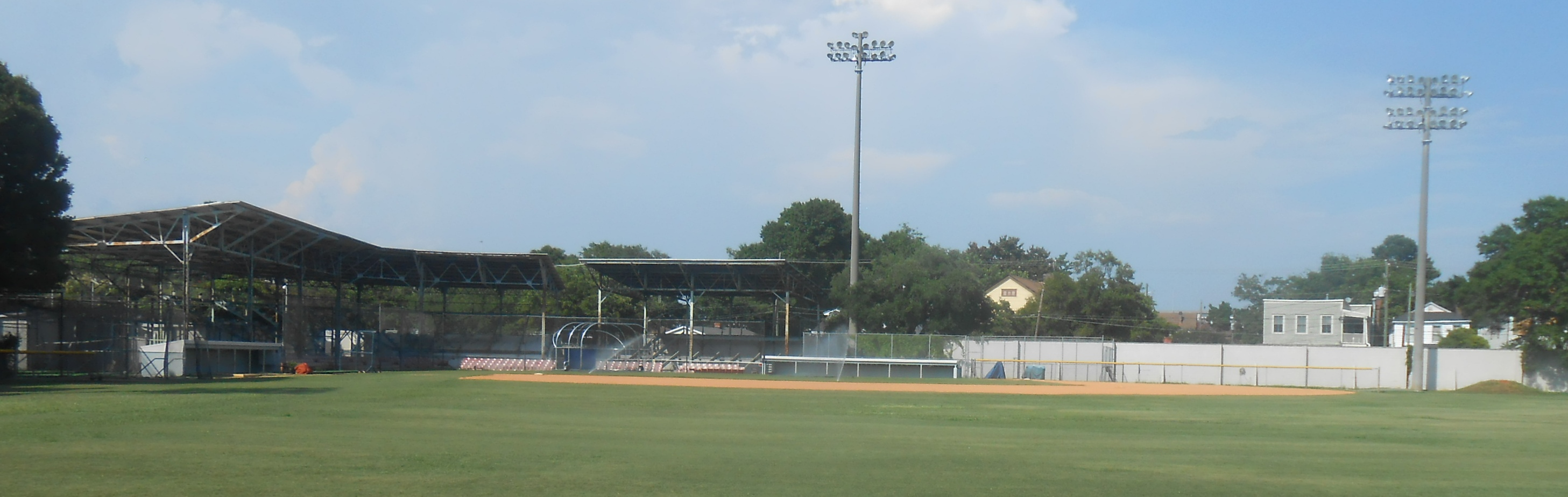
College Park

The Bulldogs play their games at Joseph P. Riley Jr. Park located just outside The Citadel campus in Charleston, SC. They share the facility with the Class A Charleston RiverDogs, and have permanent rights to play in the stadium as it was built on formerly Citadel-owned land. The original home of The Citadel baseball team was on WLI Field, on the banks of the Ashley River on campus, and still in use today by The Citadel soccer team. From 1967 until the opening of Riley Park in 1997, The Bulldogs played in College Park, located northeast of campus on Rutledge Avenue. This facility is still in use as The Citadel practice facility and for community purposes. On-campus locker rooms are located in McAlister Field House, an indoor batting cage and other team spaces are located in Vandiver Hall. Like all Citadel athletic teams, the Bulldogs utilize strength and conditioning, medical, and video spaces in Seignious Hall.

== Coaches ==
Coaching records
Below are records for all coaches who have known records at The Citadel

Coach	Years	Seasons	Wins	Losses	Ties	Pct.
O. B. "Rip" Sanderson	1908	1	5	1	0	.833
George A. Schmick	1910	1	4	6	0	.400
"Barney" Legge	1911	1	2	5	1	.286
George C. Rogers	1914–15, 1921–24	6	26	33	1	.441
Thomas S. McMillan	1916, 1919	2	8	12	0	.400
"Shorty" O'Brien	1918	1	3	9	0	.250
Ed Sabre	1920	1	3	1	0	.750
"Bull Dog" Drummond	1925	1	2	7	0	.222
H. L. "Matty" Matthews	1926–30, 1937–38	3	10	25	1	.286
Dusty Rhodes	1947	1	2	5	0	.286
Bunzy O'Neal	1948	1	6	7	0	.462
John D. McMillan	1952–53	2	14	15	0	.483
Harold Manley	1954	1	5	9	0	.357
Fred Montsdeoca	1954–56	2	22	31	0	.415
Mack Erwin	1957–60	4	62	30	1	.672
Jim Newsome	1961–64	4	37	43	0	.463
Chal Port	1965–91	27	641	386	2	.624
Fred Jordan	1992–2017	26	831	706	0	.541
Tony Skole	2018–2024	7	123	216	0	.363
Russell Triplett	2025–present	2	67	52	0	.563

Comprehensive records are only available beginning with the 1954 season. The Citadel continues to research and compile records for previous seasons.

=== Current staff ===
Coach	Position	Years
Russell Triplett	Head coach	2
David Beckley	Assistant coach	18 (1st stint 2002–2017)
James Reeves	Pitching Coach	2
Phil Tobin	Assistant Coach	2

== Seasons and results ==
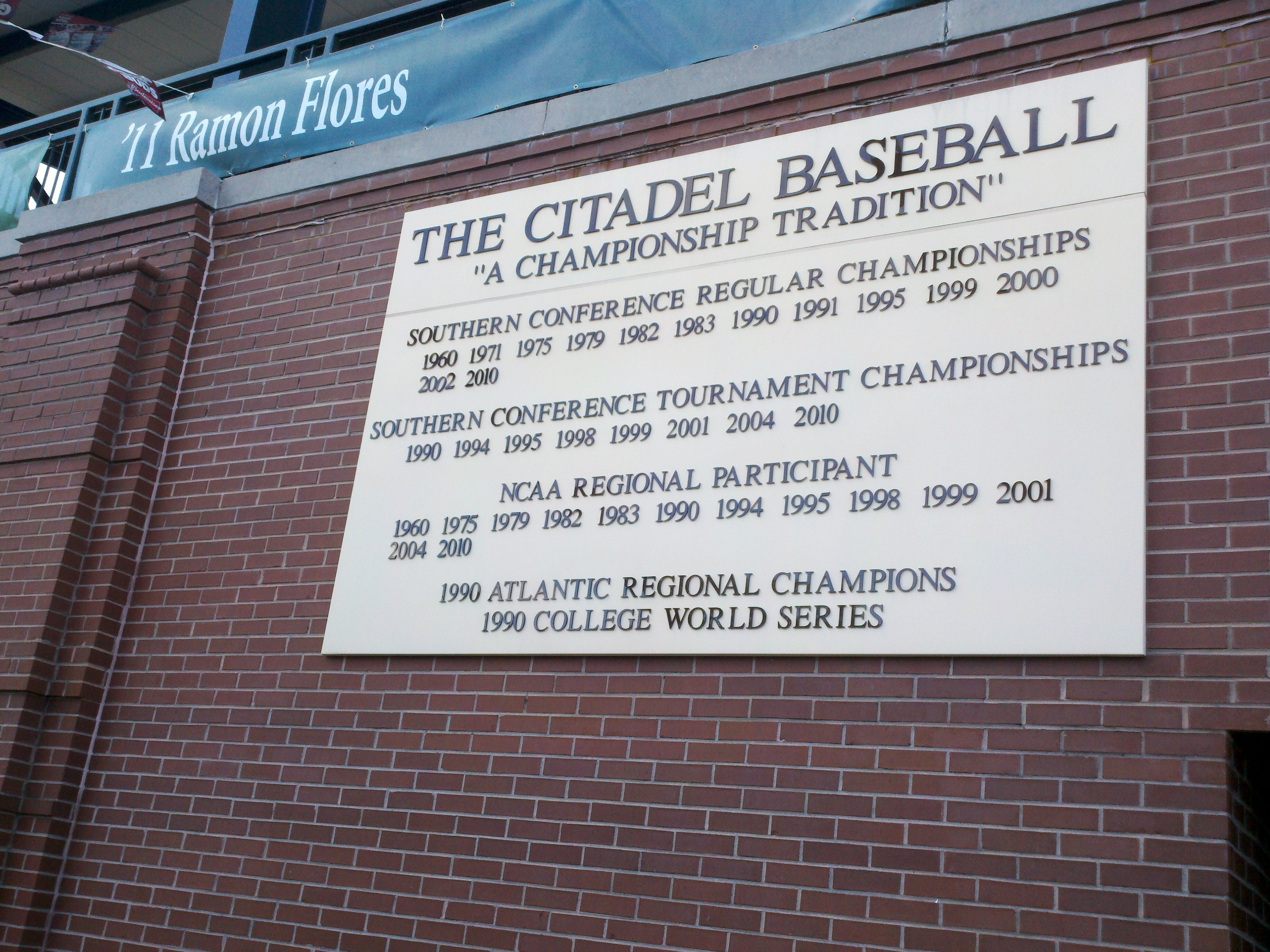
Plaque honoring The Citadel's baseball tradition at Joseph P. Riley Jr. Park

The Citadel has posted four 40-win seasons and 27 30-win seasons. The Bulldogs are one of the leading programs in the Southern Conference, trailing only Western Carolina in total championships by one, with all other programs several behind the two leaders.

== NCAA Tournament appearances ==
The Citadel holds a 14–29 record in the NCAA tournament in 14 appearances, winning the 1990 Atlantic Regional in Coral Gables, Florida.

The 1990 team overcame the damage of Hurricane Hugo to appear in the 1990 College World Series. Their finals matchup against the Miami Hurricanes resulted in headlines echoing the Hurricanes team name and noting the severe damage in Charleston, South Carolina, from Hurricane Hugo the previous fall, including damage to The Citadel's stadium, College Park. The Bulldogs went 1–2 in the College World Series, defeating Cal State Fullerton in an extra-inning thriller before falling to LSU for a second time in their elimination game.

Year	Region	Opponent	Result
1960	District 3 Playoffs	Florida; North Carolina; Florida	L 2–4; L 1–13; L 1–4
1975	Atlantic Regional	South Carolina; NC State	L 3–11; L 3–16
1979	Atlantic Regional	Miami; Georgia Southern	L 1–3 ^{(16)} L 3–5
1982	East Regional	North Carolina; South Carolina; Old Dominion; South Carolina	W 9–4; L 4–6; W 15–1; L 2–11
1983	East Regional	Delaware; North Carolina; James Madison; Delaware	W 14–5; W 5–3; L 2–5; L 1–7
1990	Atlantic Regional	NC State; East Carolina; Miami; Miami; LSU; Cal State Fullerton; LSU	W 11–3; W 8–5; W 6–2; W 4–1; L 2–8; W 8–7 ^{(12)} L 1–6
1994	East Regional (Note: The Citadel competed in a "Play-In Series" against Middle Tennessee State, the champion of the Ohio Valley Conference. The Citadel defeated Middle Tennessee 4–3 in Game 1 (in 10 innings), lost 3–11 in the second game and won the third game 4–0 to advance to the NCAA Tournament.)	Clemson; Virginia Tech; Notre Dame	L 1–5; W 4–3; L 1–5
1995	Mideast Regional	Tennessee; Pittsburgh	L 2–5; L 10–12
1998	East Regional	Clemson; Fordham; VCU	L 3–12; W 5–1; L 2–3 ^{(11)}
1999	Tallahassee Super Regional; Tallahassee Regional	Florida State; Providence	L 6–24; L 1–12
2001	Palo Alto Super Regional; Columbia Regional	South Carolina; Princeton	L 0–16; L 6–11
2004	Columbia Super Regional; Columbia Regional	South Carolina; Coastal Carolina; North Carolina	L 4–12; W 10–1; L 3–6
2010	Myrtle Beach Super Regional; Columbia Regional	Virginia Tech; South Carolina; Virginia Tech	W 7–2; L 4–9; L 3–4
2026	Atlanta Regional	Oklahoma; UIC; Oklahoma	L 3–8; W 9–8^{(10)} L 5–15

== List of championships ==
=== Tournament championships ===
The Bulldogs have claimed nine Southern Conference baseball tournament championships, second all-time after Western Carolina. The Bulldogs won their first tournament in 1990, and most recently won in 2026. The Tournament's greatest box office success has come when held in Charleston with The Citadel reaching the finals. The Citadel was a participant in each of the top 10 most attended SoCon Baseball Tournament games through the 2013 tournament.

=== Regular season championships ===
The Citadel has won thirteen Southern Conference regular season championships. They won their first in 1960 and their most recent in 2010. The Bulldogs have won more Southern Conference regular season championships than any other program currently in the conference.

== Rivalries ==
The Citadel's primary athletic rivals are Virginia Military Institute, Furman, and College of Charleston. The recent rise of College of Charleston's baseball program has led to many close games and strong attendance both at Riley Park and at CofC Baseball Stadium at Patriots Point. The Bulldogs have had success against most in state schools, with the exception of Clemson and South Carolina.

== Bulldogs in the pros ==
At least 47 players from The Citadel have played in the minor leagues.

=== Major League Baseball draft ===
The Citadel has had 50 Major League Baseball draft selections since the draft began in 1965. Notable picks include 1985 second round pick (46th overall) Tim Jones, 2001 second round pick (57th overall) Dallas McPherson, and 2010 second round pick (41st overall) Asher Wojciechowski.

Bulldogs in the Major League Baseball Draft
Year	Player	Round	Team
1965	Thomas Porter	31	Yankees
1966	Smith Holland	13	Phillies
1977	Richard Wieters	5	Braves
1979	Francis Galloway	24	Brewers
1982	Jeff Barkley	13	Indians
1982	Mike Knox	7	Braves
1982	Bill White	5	Dodgers
1983	Martin Blair	44	Rangers
1983	Michael Cherry	2	Dodgers
1984	John Murphy	23	Cardinals
1985	Tim Jones	2	Cardinals
1988	John Stephens	28	Cardinals
1990	Anthony Jenkins	29	Cardinals
1991	Brad Stowell	30	Athletics
1992	Gettys Glaze	15	Red Sox
1995	Brian Callahan	25	Athletics
1995	Britt Reames	17	Cardinals
1996	Garrick Hattiwanger	11	Mets
1998	Jarod Simmons	40	Braves
1998	Terrence Smalls	24	Marlins
1998	Brian Rogers	5	Yankees
1999	Rodney Hancock	29	Pirates
1999	Brian Wiley	15	Red Sox
2000	Ron Colvard	43	Indians
2000	Chris Morris	15	Cardinals
2001	Philip Hartig	25	Marlins
2001	T.W. Mincey	12	Orioles
2001	Dallas McPherson	2	Angels
2002	T.A. Fulmer	13	Mariners
2004	Chip Cannon	8	Blue Jays
2004	Jonathan Ellis	6	Padres
2006	Matt Matulia	24	Cubs
2007	Zachary Brown	27	Padres
2008	Chris Swauger	26	Cardinals
2009	Wesley Wrenn	35	Mets
2009	Matt Crim	21	Braves
2009	Chris McGuiness	13	Red Sox
2009	Richard Jones	9	Cubs
2010	Bryan Altman	41	Padres
2010	Matt Talley	25	Diamondbacks
2010	Asher Wojciechowski	1	Blue Jays
2011	Matt Talley	28	Braves
2013	Austin Pritcher	19	Tigers
2013	Joe Jackson	5	Rangers
2014	Mason Davis	19	Marlins
2014	Leonard Thompson	13	Yankees
2015	Austin Mason	17	Diamondbacks
2015	Skylar Hunter	12	Phillies
2015	James Reeves	10	Yankees
2017	JP Sears	11	Mariners

=== Major League players ===
11 Bulldogs have played in the Major Leagues.

Years*	Seasons^	Player	Teams(s)
1920–1924	3	Sumpter Clarke	Cubs, Indians
1984–1985	2	Jeff Barkley	Indians
1986–1988	3	Don Gordon	Blue Jays, Indians
1988–1993	6	Tim Jones	Cardinals
2000–2003	4	Scott Mullen	Royals, Dodgers
2000–2006	6	Britt Reames	Cardinals, Expos, Athletics, Pirates
2004–2011	5	Dallas McPherson	Angels, Marlins, White Sox
2013	1	Chris McGuiness	Rangers
2015–2021	5	Asher Wojciechowski	Houston Astros, Cincinnati Reds, Baltimore Orioles, New York Yankees
2016–2020	5	Mike Clevinger (Note: Mike Clevinger spent the 2010 season with the Bulldogs before transferring.)	Cleveland Indians, San Diego Padres
2021–present	5	JP Sears	New York Yankees, Oakland Athletics/Athletics, San Diego Padres

*Years span all seasons played ^Seasons includes partial seasons

== Individual honors ==
The Citadel frequently produces players who claim national and conference level awards. Below are selected postseason All-America awards as well as Southern Conference awards for full seasons and end of season tournaments.

All-Americans
ABCA

- 1990 – Anthony Jenkins (OF) – First team
- 2010 – Asher Wojciechowski (P) – Third team

Baseball America

- 1983 – Mike Cherry (P) – First team
- 2010 – Asher Wojciechowski (P) – Third team

Collegiate Baseball/Louisville Slugger

- 1999 – Rodney Hancock (P) – Third team
- 1999 – Brian Wiley (P) – Third team
- 2000 – Philip Hartig (1B) – Second team
- 2001 – Randy Corn (P) – Second team
- 2001 – Philip Hartig (1B) – Third team
- 2002 – Randy Corn (P) – Third team
- 2004 – Chip Cannon (1B) – Third team
- 2009 – Richard Jones (C) – Second team
- 2010 – Asher Wojciechowski (P) – Second team
- 2013 – Joe Jackson (C) – Third team

Freshman All-American

- 2013 – Skylar Hunter (P)

Southern Conference Tournament Most Outstanding Player

Year	Player
1990	Billy Baker
1994	Jermaine Shuler
1995	Donald Morillo
1998	Brian Rogers
1999	Rodney Hancock
2001	Randy Corn
2004	Jonathan Ellis
2010	Justin Mackert
2013	Joe Jackson

Southern Conference Player of the Year

Year	Player
1976	Richard Wieters
1977	Richard Wieters
1982	Bill White
1983	Mike Cherry
2001	Philip Hartig

Southern Conference Pitcher of the Year

Year	Player
1990	Ken Britt
1992	Gettys Glaze
1999	Brian Wiley
2001	Eric Talbert
2002	Randy Corn
2004	Jonathan Ellis
2009	Wes Wrenn
2010	Asher Wojciechowski
2013	Austin Pritcher
2015	James Reeves
2017	J. P. Sears

== See also ==
- List of NCAA Division I baseball programs
