= 2013 Southern Conference baseball tournament =

- Teams: 8
- Format: two bracket Double-elimination tournament with championship game
- Finals site: Fluor Field at the West End; Greenville, SC
- Champions: Elon (2nd title)
- Winning coach: Mike Kennedy (2nd title)
- MVP: Joe Jackson (The Citadel)
- Attendance: 8,810

2013 Southern Conference baseball standings
	Conf.				Overall
Team	W		L	PCT	W		L	PCT
Western Carolina ‍†‍‍	23	–	7	.767	39	–	20	.661
College of Charleston ‍‍‍	18	–	11	.621	31	–	26	.544
Elon ‍‍‡‍^{y}	18	–	11	.621	34	–	30	.531
The Citadel ‍‍‍	18	–	12	.600	35	–	25	.583
Appalachian State ‍‍‍	13	–	14	.481	30	–	24	.556
Furman ‍‍‍	14	–	16	.467	32	–	25	.561
Georgia Southern ‍‍‍	13	–	17	.433	27	–	32	.458
Samford ‍‍‍	12	–	17	.414	27	–	30	.474
Davidson ‍‍‍	12	–	18	.400	18	–	31	.367
UNC Greensboro ‍‍‍	11	–	19	.367	24	–	31	.436
Wofford ‍‍‍	10	–	20	.333	20	–	36	.357
† – Conference champion ‡ – Tournament champion y – Invited to the NCAA tournament As of June 30, 2013; Rankings from Collegiate Baseball

The 2013 Southern Conference baseball tournament was held from May 22 through 26 at Fluor Field at the West End in Greenville, South Carolina. The annual event determines the conference champion of the Division I Southern Conference in college baseball. Third seeded Elon won their second tournament champion to earn the league's bid to the 2013 NCAA Division I baseball tournament. This was the last of 18 athletic championships held by the conference in the 2012–13 academic year.

The tournament was originally held from 1950–53, when the Southern Conference was a large conference composed of several small schools and several large schools, the latter of which would form the Atlantic Coast Conference after the 1953 season. The event was re-established in 1984 and has been held every year since. Western Carolina has claimed nine championships, the most of any school, with The Citadel close behind at eight tournament wins. Georgia Southern and Furman are the only other schools with multiple championships, winning five and two, respectively. Davidson and UNC Greensboro are the only current members to never win a title.

This is the second consecutive year and third year overall for the tournament in Greenville, after spending 21 of 22 seasons in Charleston, South Carolina.

== Seeding and format ==
The top eight teams from the regular season are seeded one through eight based on conference winning percentage. They meet in a two bracket double-elimination tournament with a championship game between the winners of each bracket. Davidson, UNC Greensboro, and Wofford did not qualify for the field. College of Charleston claimed the second seed over Elon by tiebreaker.

Team	W	L	Pct.	GB	Seed
Western Carolina	23	7	.767	–	1
College of Charleston	18	11	.621	4.5	2
Elon	18	11	.621	4.5	3
The Citadel	18	12	.600	5	4
Appalachian State	13	14	.481	8.5	5
Furman	14	16	.467	9	6
Georgia Southern	13	17	.433	10	7
Samford	12	17	.414	10.5	8
Davidson	12	18	.400	11	–
UNC Greensboro	11	19	.367	12	–
Wofford	10	20	.333	13	–

== Bracket ==
First round
1	Western Carolina	13
8	Samford	7
4	The Citadel	6
5	Appalachian State	5
8	Samford	1
5	Appalachian State	2
3	Elon	1
6	Furman	10
2	College of Charleston	0
7	Georgia Southern	2
3	Elon	18
2	College of Charleston	8

Second round
1	Western Carolina	11
4	The Citadel	12
1	Western Carolina	4
5	Appalachian State	15
6	Furman	2
7	Georgia Southern	3
6	Furman	1
3	Elon	8

Semifinals
4	The Citadel	8	—
5	Appalachian State	6	—
7	Georgia Southern	4	6
3	Elon	11	7

Final
4	The Citadel	5
3	Elon	6

== All-Tournament Team ==
The following players were named to the All-Tournament team.

Pos	Name	School
SP	Kyle Webb	Elon
SP	Justin Hess	Georgia Southern
RP	Dylan Clark	Elon
C	Joe Jackson	The Citadel
1B	Ryan Kinsella	Elon
2B	Hector Crespo	Appalachian State
SS	Antonio Alvarez	Elon
3B	Tyler White	Western Carolina
OF	Tyler Griffin	The Citadel
OF	Sebastian Gomez	Elon
OF	Julian Ridings	Western Carolina
DH	Bo Thompson	The Citadel

=== Most Outstanding Player ===
Joe Jackson was named Tournament Most Outstanding Player. Jackson was a catcher for The Citadel who recorded 10 hits in 13 at-bats and reached base on 18 of 20 plate appearances for the tournament.
