= Elon Phoenix baseball =

- 2026 Elon Phoenix baseball team
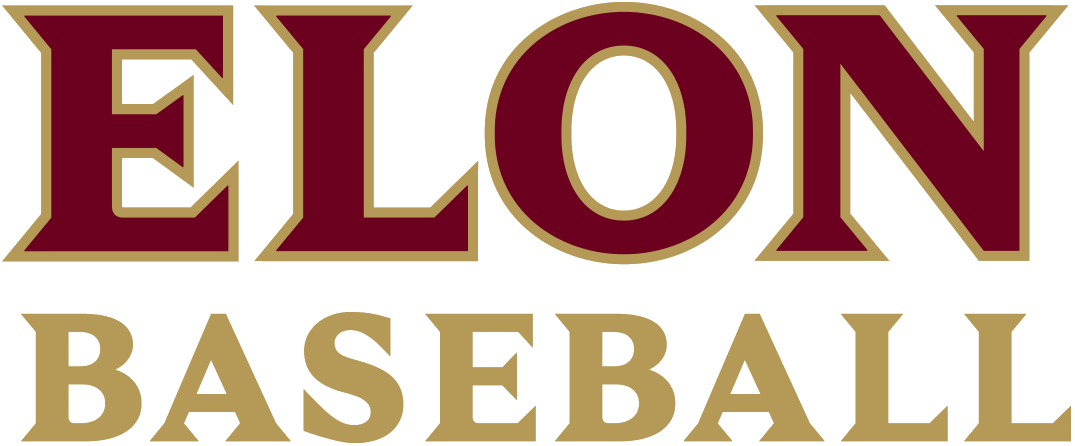
- Founded: 1900
- University: Elon University
- Head coach: Mike Kennedy (30th season)
- Conference: Colonial Athletic
- Location: Elon, North Carolina
- Home stadium: Walter C. Latham Park (capacity: 2,000)
- Nickname: Phoenix
- Colors: Maroon and gold

NCAA tournament appearances
- 2002, 2006, 2008, 2009, 2010, 2013

Conference tournament champions
- 2008, 2013

Conference regular season champions
- 2006, 2008, 2009, 2011, 2019

The Elon Phoenix baseball team is the interscholastic baseball team from Elon University in Elon, North Carolina. They are part of the NCAA Division I Colonial Athletic Association. The team is led by head coach Mike Kennedy, who has been head coach since 1997.

Elon plays its home games at Walter C. Latham Park on Elon's campus.

== History ==
=== 1997–present ===
Mike Kennedy has been the head coach at Elon since 1997. He was a two-time Honorable Mention All-American catcher for Elon University between 1988–1990, and was later selected in the 9th round of the 1990 Major League Baseball draft. He spent four seasons as Elon's pitching coach before becoming head coach. Kennedy was selected to serve as the pitching coach for the USA Baseball's Collegiate National Team during the summer. Prior to the 2010 season, Kennedy led Elon to 436 victories in his 13 years, and had led the team to 19 victories over teams ranked in the top 25 in the past 11 years. During the 2010 season, Kennedy led the Phoenix to back-to-back road wins against highly ranked Clemson University as well as a home win against University of North Carolina at Chapel Hill and wins against Wake Forest and NC State. The 2010 team made it past the SoCon Tournament and into the NCAA Regional rounds. On April 24, 2011, Kennedy won his 500th game at Elon as the Phoenix defeated Georgia Southern by a final of 9–0.

Kennedy's program has won 40 or more games in three of the last seven seasons and boasts four Southern Conference regular-season crowns.

With each victory tallied, Kennedy adds to his record for the most wins by an Elon baseball coach that he set in 2003. In his 16 seasons, Kennedy has guided the Phoenix to 543 victories. In the last 14 seasons, Elon has had 22 victories over opponents ranked in the top-25. In his tenure, Kennedy has led his program to 49 victories over Atlantic Coast Conference opponents.

In 2012, Kennedy led his Phoenix squad to yet another top-three finish in the SoCon as the maroon and gold went 33–26 overall and 20–10 in league action. Kennedy's teams have now posted at least 30 victories in each of their 13 official NCAA Division I seasons.

At the conclusion of the season, two Elon players were selected in the Major League Baseball draft. Two Phoenix standouts were also recognized with All-Southern Conference accolades.

Following the year, four Elon players were selected in the Major League Baseball draft and a fifth signed a free agent contract. Four members of the squad were also recognized with all-league accolades, including John Brebbia, who was chosen as the SoCon Pitcher of the Year. Infielder Sebastian Gomez was honored as a member of the Louisville Slugger Freshmen All-American Team.

== Elon in the NCAA Tournament ==
Year	Record	Pct	Notes
2002	0–2	.000	Clemson Regional
2006	1–2	.333	Clemson Regional
2008	1–2	.333	Cary Regional
2009	1–2	.333	Atlanta Regional
2010	0–2	.000	Atlanta Regional
2013	2–2	.500	Charlottesville Regional
TOTALS	5–12	.294	

== Top Major League Baseball Draft picks in Elon's history ==
2019 – George Kirby (Round 1, 20th overall by the Seattle Mariners)

1971 – Gary Brown (Round 1, 21st overall by the Chicago Cubs)

1981 – Joey Hackett (Round 4, 71st overall by the Texas Rangers)

2008 – Steven Hensley (Round 4, 132nd overall by the Seattle Mariners)

2001 – Brad Pinkerton (Round 5, 149th overall by the Anaheim Angels)

2009 – Chase Austin (Round 5, 158th overall by the Florida Marlins)

2001 – Scott Light (Round 6, 186th overall by the Cincinnati Reds)

2010 – Jimmy Reyes (Round 7, 226th overall by the Texas Rangers)

1966 – Dick Such (Round 8, 100th overall by the Washington Senators)

1992 – Aaron Cannaday (Round 8, 231st overall by the Pittsburgh Pirates)

2019 – Kyle Brnovich (Round 8, 241st overall by the Los Angeles Angels)

2019 – Ty Adcock (Round 8, 246th overall by the Seattle Mariners)

1990 – Mike Kennedy (Round 9, 255th overall by the Oakland Athletics)

== Major leaguers ==
- Ted Abernathy
- Ty Adcock
- Greg Booker
- John Brebbia
- Tom Brewer
- Cap Clark
- Cam Devanney
- Bill Evans
- Bill Graham
- Greg Harris
- Bunny Hearn
- George Kirby
- Ed Sauer
- Dick Such
- Joe Winkelsas

== See also ==
- List of NCAA Division I baseball programs
