= Fred Jordan (baseball coach) =

American baseball coach

Biographical details
- Born: c. 1958 (age 67–68); Charleston, South Carolina, U.S.

Playing career
- 1976–79: The Citadel
- Position: P

Coaching career (HC unless noted)
- 1992–2017: The Citadel

Head coaching record
- Overall: 831–706 (.541)

Accomplishments and honors

Championships
- 7 SoCon tournament (1994, 1995, 1998, 1999, 2001, 2004, 2010); 5 SoCon Regular season (1995, 1999, 2000, 2002, 2010)

Awards
- 4 Socon Coach of the Year (1995, 1999, 2003, 2010)

Fred Jordan (born c. 1958) is an American college baseball coach, who was the 26th head coach of The Citadel Bulldogs baseball team, located in Charleston, South Carolina. He succeeded legendary Citadel coach Chal Port, for whom he had played, and held the position from 1992 to 2017. Jordan is a 1979 graduate of The Citadel.

His career coaching record at The Citadel was 831 wins and 706 losses. He has the record for the most wins in Citadel and Southern Conference history and fifth at The Citadel in winning percentage. Under Jordan, The Citadel appeared in seven NCAA Regionals, won seven Southern Conference baseball tournament championships and won five SoCon regular season championships. He coached 35 players who were selected in the Major League Baseball draft. He won his 800th game on February 20, 2016, with a 5–4 victory over Virginia Tech. He was the 27th coach to achieve 800 wins at the Division I level.

== Head coaching record ==
Record table
Season	Team	Overall	Conference	Standing	Postseason
The Citadel (Southern Conference) (1992–2017)
1992	The Citadel	35–20	10–9	4th	
1993	The Citadel	32–25	13–9	3rd	
1994	The Citadel	35–24	11–19	4th	Regionals
1995	The Citadel	39–21	19–5	1st	Regionals
1996	The Citadel	33–26	13–10	4th	
1997	The Citadel	37–21	16–7	3rd	
1998	The Citadel	37–24	21–5	2nd	Regionals
1999	The Citadel	41–20	24–5	1st	Regionals
2000	The Citadel	39–20	23–7	T–1st	
2001	The Citadel	38–24	20–10	2nd	Regionals
2002	The Citadel	31–26	22–8	1st	
2003	The Citadel	32–25	19–11	3rd	
2004	The Citadel	39–28	21–9	T–2nd	Regionals
2005	The Citadel	25–34	14–16	6th	
2006	The Citadel	34–27	15–12	5th	
2007	The Citadel	34–27	12–15	7th	
2008	The Citadel	28–28	12–15	8th	
2009	The Citadel	37–22	20–10	3rd	
2010	The Citadel	43–22	24–6	1st	Regionals
2011	The Citadel	20–36	8–22	11th	
2012	The Citadel	25–33	13–17	8th	
2013	The Citadel	35–25	18–12	4th	SoCon Tournament runner-up (Note: 8 of the SoCon's 11 teams qualified for the tournament)
2014	The Citadel	24–34	8–18	10th	SoCon tournament (Note: All 10 of the SoCon's teams qualified for the tournament in 2014.)
2015	The Citadel	28–30	10–14	8th	SoCon tournament (Note: All 9 of the SoCon's teams qualified for the tournament in 2015.)
2016	The Citadel	17–42	6–18	8th	SoCon tournament (Note: All 9 of the SoCon's teams qualified for the tournament in 2015.)
2017	The Citadel	16–35	7–17	T-8th	SoCon tournament (Note: All 9 of the SoCon's teams qualified for the tournament in 2015.)
Total:		831–706			
National champion Postseason invitational champion Conference regular season champion Conference regular season and conference tournament champion Division regular season champion Division regular season and conference tournament champion Conference tournament champion
