= Joseph P. Riley Jr. Park =

Baseball stadium in Charleston, South Carolina, United States

- The Joe
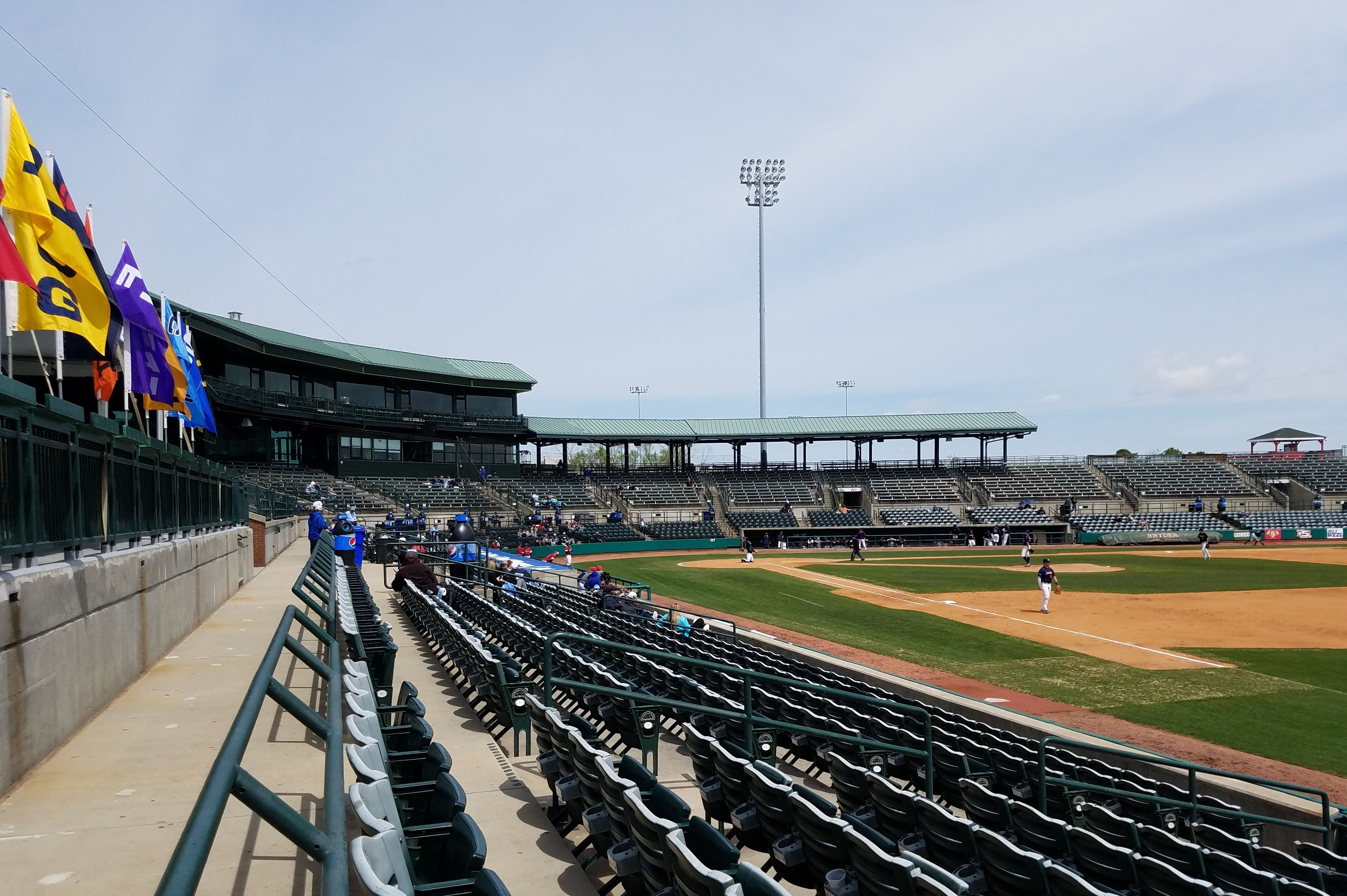
- Interactive map of Joseph P. Riley Jr. Park
- Location: 360 Fishburne Street; Charleston, SC 29403
- Coordinates: 32°47′25″N 79°57′40″W
- Owner: City of Charleston
- Operator: City of Charleston/ Charleston Baseball, Inc.
- Capacity: 6,000
- Surface: Bermuda Grass
- Field size: Left Field: 305 feet (93 m); Left Center: 356 feet (109 m); Center Field: 398 feet (121 m); Right Center: 366 feet (112 m); Right Field: 337 feet (103 m)

Construction
- Groundbreaking: June 7, 1996
- Opened: April 6, 1997
- Cost: US$19.5 million ($39.1 million in 2025 dollars)
- Architects: Populous; Goff D'Antonio Associates
- Structural engineer: Kerr, Conrad & Graham
- Services engineers: Bredson & Associates, Inc.
- General contractor: McDevitt Street Bovis

Tenants
- Charleston RiverDogs (SAL/Carolina League) (1997–present); The Citadel Bulldogs baseball

Joseph P. Riley Jr. Park is a baseball stadium located in Charleston, South Carolina. The stadium is named after Charleston's longest-serving mayor, Joseph P. Riley Jr., who was instrumental in its construction. The stadium replaced College Park. It was built in 1997 and seats 6,000 people.

Nicknamed "The Joe" by locals, Joseph P. Riley Jr. Park is primarily used for baseball and is the home field of the Charleston RiverDogs baseball team of the Carolina League and The Citadel Bulldogs baseball team, whose campus is located nearby.

== History ==
The park has hosted 15 Southern Conference baseball tournaments through the 2014 season. On March 2, 2012, the venue hosted the neutral-site game of the Clemson–South Carolina baseball series. The game, which South Carolina won 3–2 in 11 innings, was attended by 5,851 spectators. The Citadel defeated the Gamecocks 10–8 on April 16, 2014 before 6,500 fans, setting a new record for a college baseball crowd in Charleston.

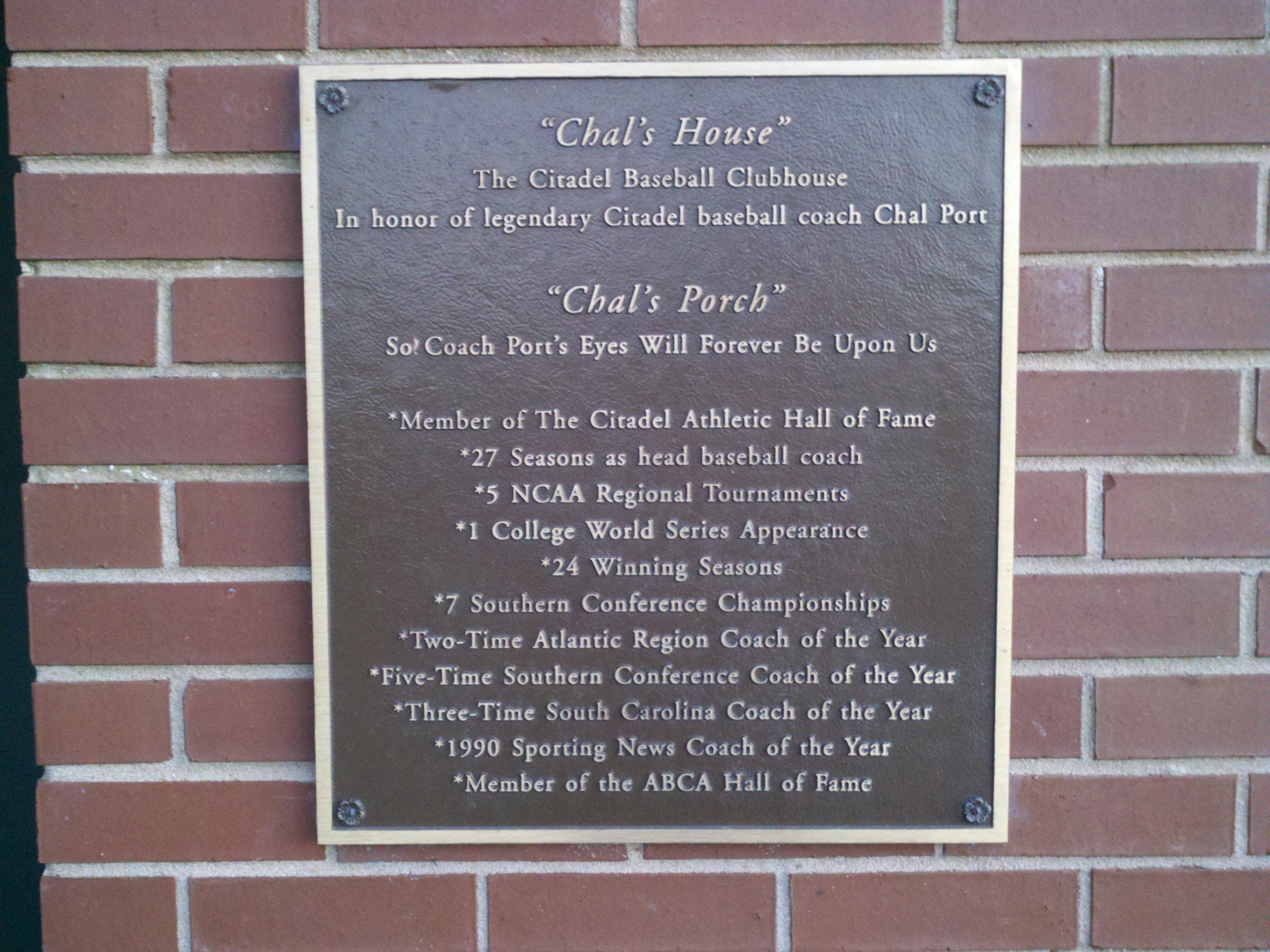
Plaque honoring Citadel coach Chal Port outside the Bulldogs clubhouse

The Citadel holds lifetime playing rights at the ballpark and has its own clubhouse in the stadium. The land that the stadium is built on once belonged to the school, and was a part of the land-swap negotiations that resulted in the City of Charleston taking over the land and giving The Citadel title to College Park.

== See also ==
- List of NCAA Division I baseball venues
