= UNC Greensboro Spartans baseball =

UNC Greensboro Spartans
- 2026 UNC Greensboro Spartans baseball team
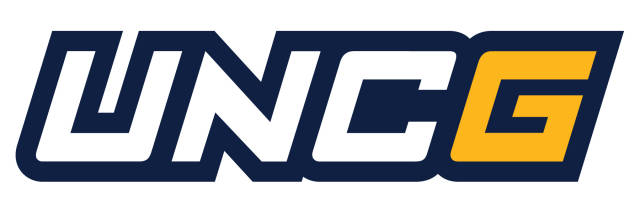
- Founded: 1991
- University: University of North Carolina at Greensboro
- Head coach: Cody Ellis (3rd season)
- Conference: Southern
- Location: Greensboro, North Carolina
- Home stadium: UNCG Baseball Stadium (Capacity: 3,500)
- Nickname: Spartans
- Colors: Navy, white, and gold

NCAA tournament appearances
- 1994, 1997, 2017, 2022

Conference tournament champions
- 1997, 2017, 2022

Conference regular season champions
- 1994, 1997, 1998, 2018, 2024

The UNC Greensboro Spartans baseball program is a varsity intercollegiate athletic team for the University of North Carolina at Greensboro (UNCG) in Greensboro, North Carolina. The team is a member of the Southern Conference (SoCon), which is part of the National Collegiate Athletic Association (NCAA)'s Division I. The team plays its home games at the UNCG Baseball Stadium.

The Spartans are coached by Cody Ellis, who was promoted to head coach in May 2024.

== UNC Greensboro in the NCAA tournament ==
Year	Record	Pct	Notes
1994	2–2	.500	South Regional
1997	1–2	.333	South I Regional
2017	1–2	.333	Clemson Regional
2022	0–2	.000	Statesboro Regional
TOTALS	4-8	.333	

== Head coaches ==
- Cody Ellis: 2024-
- Billy Godwin: 2019-2023
- Link Jarrett: 2012-2019
- Mike Gaski: 1990-2012
