= 2006 Southern Conference baseball tournament =

- Teams: 10
- Format: Double-elimination tournament
- Finals site: Joseph P. Riley Jr. Park; Charleston, South Carolina
- Champions: College of Charleston (1st title)
- MVP: Nick Chigges and Jess Easterling (College of Charleston)
- Attendance: 28,206

2006 Southern Conference baseball standings
	Conf.				Overall
Team	W		L	PCT	W		L	PCT
Elon ‍†‍‍^{y}	21	–	6	.778	45	–	18	.714
#13 College of Charleston ‡^{y} ‍‍‍	20	–	7	.741	46	–	17	.730
Furman ‍‍‍	16	–	11	.593	32	–	23	.582
Georgia Southern ‍‍‍	16	–	11	.593	31	–	27	.534
The Citadel ‍‍‍	15	–	12	.556	34	–	27	.557
Western Carolina ‍‍‍	14	–	13	.519	33	–	27	.550
UNC Greensboro ‍‍‍	13	–	14	.481	26	–	33	.441
Appalachian State ‍‍‍	9	–	18	.333	24	–	31	.436
Davidson ‍‍‍	6	–	21	.222	18	–	33	.353
Wofford ‍‍‍	5	–	22	.185	20	–	37	.351
† – Conference champion ‡ – SoCon Tournament champion y – Invited to the NCAA tournament As of June 30, 2006; Rankings from Collegiate Baseball

The 2006 Southern Conference baseball tournament was held at Joseph P. Riley Jr. Park in Charleston, South Carolina, from May 23 through 27. Second seeded College of Charleston won the tournament and earned the Southern Conference's automatic bid to the 2006 NCAA Division I baseball tournament. It was the Cougars' first SoCon tournament win.

All ten baseball programs in the conference participated in the tournament, with the seventh through tenth place teams playing a single-elimination opening day prior to an 8-team, double-elimination tournament.

== Seeding ==
Team	W	L	Pct	GB	Seed
Elon	21	6	.778	–	1
College of Charleston	20	7	.740	1	2
Furman	16	11	.593	5	3
Georgia Southern	16	11	.593	5	4
The Citadel	15	12	.556	6	5
Western Carolina	14	13	.519	7	6
UNC Greensboro	13	14	.481	8	7
Appalachian State	9	18	.333	12	8
Davidson	6	21	.222	15	9
Wofford	5	22	.185	16	10

== Results ==
Seeding and pairings

=== Play-In Round ===
Tuesday, May 23
Team	R
#10 Wofford	5
#7 UNC Greensboro	6
Notes: Wofford eliminated

Tuesday, May 23
Team	R
#9 Davidson	4
#8 Appalachian State	5
Notes: Davidson eliminated

=== Bracket ===
Upper round 1	Upper round 2	Upper final	Final
3	Furman	1
6	Western Carolina	14
2	College of Charleston	1
6	Western Carolina	0
7	UNC Greensboro	5
2	College of Charleston	13
1	Elon	1
2	College of Charleston	12
8	Appalachian State	3
1	Elon	4
1	Elon	12
4	The Citadel	3
5	Georgia Southern	3
4	The Citadel	6	2	College of Charleston	5	—
4	The Citadel	4	—
Lower round 1	Lower round 2	Lower round 3	Lower final
7	UNC Greensboro	3
3	Furman	4	4	The Citadel	10	4	The Citadel	14
7	UNC Greensboro	5	4	The Citadel	4	1	Elon	1
6	Western Carolina	2
6	Western Carolina	13
5	Georgia Southern	5	5	Georgia Southern	3
8	Appalachian State	2

== All-Tournament Team ==
Position	Player	School
P	Nick Chigges	College of Charleston
C	Alex Garabedian	College of Charleston
1B	Trey Daniel	Western Carolina
2B	Chris Campbell	College of Charleston
SS	Jess Easterling	College of Charleston
3B	Adam Weaver	Elon
OF	Chris Swauger	The Citadel
OF	Larry Cobb	College of Charleston
OF	Chris Price	Elon
DH	Sonny Meade	The Citadel

Walt Nadzak Award, Tournament Most Outstanding Player
Nick Chigges and Jess Easterling
College of Charleston
