= 2002 Southern Conference baseball tournament =

- Teams: 8
- Format: Double-elimination tournament
- Finals site: Joseph P. Riley Jr. Park; Charleston, South Carolina
- Champions: Georgia Southern (3rd title)
- Winning coach: Rodney Hennon (2nd title)
- MVP: Brett Lewis (Georgia Southern)
- Attendance: 22,696

2002 Southern Conference baseball standings
	Conf.				Overall
Team	W		L	PCT	W		L	PCT
The Citadel ‍†‍‍	22	–	8	.733	31	–	26	.544
Western Carolina ‍‍‍	20	–	10	.667	33	–	23	.589
College of Charleston ‍‍‍	19	–	11	.633	36	–	22	.621
Georgia Southern ‍‍‡‍^{y}	18	–	11	.621	39	–	25	.609
UNC Greensboro ‍‍‍	17	–	11	.607	33	–	22	.600
Furman ‍‍‍	14	–	16	.467	26	–	34	.433
Wofford ‍‍‍	14	–	16	.467	26	–	31	.456
East Tennessee State ‍‍‍	13	–	16	.448	23	–	36	.390
Davidson ‍‍‍	13	–	16	.448	21	–	29	.420
Appalachian State ‍‍‍	10	–	19	.345	16	–	34	.320
VMI ‍‍‍	1	–	27	.036	10	–	41	.196
† – Conference champion ‡ – SoCon Tournament champion y – Invited to the NCAA tournament As of June 30, 2002; Rankings from Collegiate Baseball

The 2002 Southern Conference baseball tournament was held at Joseph P. Riley Jr. Park in Charleston, South Carolina, from May 22 through 25. Fourth seeded Georgia Southern won the tournament and earned the Southern Conference's automatic bid to the 2002 NCAA Division I baseball tournament. It was the Eagles third tournament win.

The tournament used a double-elimination format. Only the top eight teams participate, so East Tennessee State, Appalachian State and VMI were not in the field.

== Seeding ==
Team	W	L	Pct	GB	Seed
The Citadel	22	8	.733	–	1
Western Carolina	20	10	.667	2	2
College of Charleston	19	11	.633	3	3
Georgia Southern	18	11	.621	3.5	4
UNC Greensboro	17	11	.607	4	5
Wofford	14	16	.467	8	6
Furman	14	16	.467	8	7
Davidson	13	16	.448	8.5	8
East Tennessee State	13	16	.448	8.5	
Appalachian State	10	19	.345	11.5	
VMI	1	27	.036	20	

== Bracket ==
Upper round 1	Upper round 2	Upper final	Final
6	Furman	6
3	College of Charleston	7
2	Western Carolina	0
3	College of Charleston	3
7	Wofford	2
2	Western Carolina	9
3	College of Charleston	9
4	Georgia Southern	4
5	UNC Greensboro	2
4	Georgia Southern	4
1	The Citadel	2
4	Georgia Southern	4
8	East Tennessee State	5
1	The Citadel	7	4	Georgia Southern	9	8
3	College of Charleston	6	0
Lower round 1	Lower round 2	Lower round 3	Lower final
1	The Citadel	0
6	Furman	7	6	Furman	6	4	Georgia Southern	10
7	Wofford	5	6	Furman	9	6	Furman	4
5	UNC Greensboro	7
2	Western Carolina	4
5	UNC Greensboro	3	5	UNC Greensboro	6
8	East Tennessee State	0

== All-Tournament Team ==
Position	Player	School
P	Brett Lewis	Georgia Southern
C	Matt Lauerdale	College of Charleston
1B	Carolos Love	Georgia Southern
2B	Jack Arroyo	College of Charleston
3B	Lee Curtis	College of Charleston
SS	Jemes Spearman	Georgia Southern
OF	Craig Caudill	Furman
OF	Kirk Strebin	UNC Greensboro
OF	Brett Anderson	College of Charleston
OF	Matt Herring	Georgia Southern
DH	Coogie Freedman	Furman

Walt Nadzak Award, Tournament Most Outstanding Player
Brett Lewis
Georgia Southern
