= 2009 Southern Conference baseball tournament =

- Teams: 8
- Format: Double-elimination tournament
- Finals site: Fluor Field at the West End; Greenville, South Carolina
- Champions: Georgia Southern (4th title)
- Winning coach: Rodney Hennon (3rd title)
- MVP: Kyle Blackburn (Georgia Southern)
- Attendance: 17,820

2009 Southern Conference baseball standings
	Conf.				Overall
Team	W		L	PCT	W		L	PCT
Elon ‍†‍‍^{y}	23	–	4	.852	41	–	18	.695
Georgia Southern ‍‍‡‍^{y}	20	–	8	.714	42	–	17	.712
The Citadel ‍‍‍	20	–	10	.667	37	–	22	.627
Western Carolina ‍‍‍	19	–	10	.655	35	–	22	.614
College of Charleston ‍‍‍	17	–	13	.567	35	–	22	.614
Appalachian State ‍‍‍	15	–	13	.536	33	–	21	.611
Davidson ‍‍‍	11	–	16	.407	18	–	31	.367
Furman ‍‍‍	10	–	20	.333	24	–	31	.436
Samford ‍‍‍	9	–	21	.300	17	–	35	.327
UNC Greensboro ‍‍‍	7	–	22	.241	20	–	29	.408
Wofford ‍‍‍	7	–	22	.241	17	–	32	.347
† – Conference champion ‡ – Tournament champion y – Invited to the NCAA tournament As of June 30, 2009; Rankings from Collegiate Baseball

The 2009 Southern Conference baseball tournament was held at Fluor Field at the West End in Greenville, South Carolina, from May 20 through 24. Second seeded Georgia Southern won the tournament and earned the Southern Conference's automatic bid to the 2009 NCAA Division I baseball tournament. It was Georgia Southern's fourth SoCon tournament win.

The tournament used a modified two bracket, double-elimination format. The teams that emerge from the loser's bracket on each side switch to the other bracket and play the team emerging from each winner's bracket, with the surviving teams playing a one-game final. Only the top eight teams participate, so Wofford, UNC Greensboro, and Davidson were not in the field.

== Seeding ==
Team	W	L	T	Pct	GB	Seed
Elon	23	4	0	.852	–	1
Georgia Southern	20	8	0	.714	3.5	2
The Citadel	20	10	0	.667	4.5	3
Western Carolina	19	10	0	.655	5	4
College of Charleston	17	13	0	.567	7.5	5
Appalachian State	15	13	0	.536	8.5	6
Davidson	11	16	0	.407	12	7
Furman	10	20	0	.333	14.5	8
Samford	9	21	0	.300	15.5	
UNC Greensboro	7	21	0	.250	16.5	
Wofford	7	22	0	.241	17.5	

== Brackets ==
=== Bracket One ===
First round
7	Davidson	3
2	Georgia Southern	4
6	Appalachian State	4
3	The Citadel	1
Lower round 1
3	The Citadel	9
7	Davidson	8

Second round
2	Georgia Southern	6
6	Appalachian State	5
Lower final
6	Appalachian State	3
3	The Citadel	5

Semifinals
8	Furman
2	Georgia Southern

=== Bracket Two ===
First round
8	Furman	8
1	Elon	10
5	College of Charleston	4
4	Western Carolina	12
Lower round 1
5	College of Charleston	5
8	Furman	6

Second round
1	Elon	15
4	Western Carolina	7
Lower final
4	Western Carolina	6
8	Furman	7

Semifinals
3	The Citadel
1	Elon

=== Final ===
Sunday, May 24
Team	R
#2 Georgia Southern	7
#1 Elon	3

== Game summaries ==
=== Round One ===
Wednesday, May 20 9:10 am
Team	1	2	3	4	5	6	7	8	9	10	11	R	H	E
#7 Davidson	1	1	0	0	1	0	0	0	0	0	0	3	8	2
#2 Georgia Southern	0	0	1	0	0	0	2	0	0	0	1	4	12	2
WP: Kyle Kamppi LP: Thomas Middour; Attendance: 791; Boxscore

Wednesday, May 20 2:01 pm
Team	1	2	3	4	5	6	7	8	9	R	H	E
#6 Appalachian State	1	0	0	0	0	3	0	0	3	4	8	1
#3 The Citadel	1	0	0	0	0	0	0	0	0	1	7	1
WP: Zach Quate LP: Wes Wrenn; Attendance: 1,274; Boxscore

Wednesday, May 20 6:11 pm
Team	1	2	3	4	5	6	7	8	9	R	H	E
#8 Furman	2	0	1	3	1	1	0	0	0	8	16	3
#1 Elon	0	1	0	1	2	0	2	4	X	10	14	1
WP: Jared Kernodle LP: Nick Karow Sv: Thomas Girdwood; Home runs: FU: None; EU: Tarleton, Melillo; Attendance: 1,407; Boxscore

Wednesday, May 20 10:11 pm
Team	1	2	3	4	5	6	7	8	9	R	H	E
#5 College of Charleston	0	0	0	0	1	0	3	0	0	4	11	2
#4 Western Carolina	0	6	1	0	0	2	3	0	X	12	20	0
WP: Chris Masters LP: Jesse Simpson; Home runs: CofC: Sizemore, Rakar; WCU: Lyons; Attendance: 667; Boxscore

=== Round Two ===
Thursday, May 21 9:00 am
Team	1	2	3	4	5	6	7	8	9	R	H	E
#3 The Citadel	2	3	1	0	0	1	0	1	1	9	16	3
#7 Davidson	1	0	0	2	5	0	0	0	0	8	12	1
WP: Drew Mahaffey LP: Thomas Middour; Home runs: Cid: McGuiness; DAV: Brady; Attendance: 505; Notes: Davidson eliminated Boxscore

Thursday, May 21 1:28 pm
Team	1	2	3	4	5	6	7	8	9	R	H	E
#5 College of Charleston	0	0	0	1	4	0	0	0	0	5	6	1
#8 Furman	0	0	3	2	1	0	0	0	X	6	10	2
WP: Bobby Lyne LP: Curtis Dowling Sv: Nick Karow; Home runs: CofC: None; FU: Rose, Miller; Attendance: 1,052; Notes: College of Charleston eliminated Boxscore

Thursday, May 21 5:05 pm
Team	1	2	3	4	5	6	7	8	9	R	H	E
#2 Georgia Southern	0	1	2	0	2	1	0	0	0	6	10	0
#6 Appalachian State	0	2	0	0	1	0	0	2	0	5	14	1
WP: Jake Brown LP: Josh Dowdy Sv: Dexter Bobo; Home runs: GSU: Wright; ASU: Benedict, Blackburn 2 Attendance: 1,112; Boxscore

Thursday, May 21 5:06 pm
Team	1	2	3	4	5	6	7	8	9	R	H	E
#1 Elon	3	6	2	0	3	1	0	0	0	15	18	1
#4 Western Carolina	5	0	0	0	0	0	0	0	2	7	7	2
WP: Daniel Britt LP: Garrett Ozar; Home runs: EU: CAustin 2, Davis; WCU: Lyons; Attendance: 884; Boxscore

=== Round Three ===
Friday, May 22 3:00 pm
Team	1	2	3	4	5	6	7	8	9	R	H	E
#6 Appalachian State	1	0	0	0	0	0	0	1	1	3	8	0
#3 The Citadel	0	1	3	0	0	1	0	0	X	5	11	1
WP: Matt Crim LP: Matt Andress; Home runs: ASU: None; Cid: Meade; Attendance: 1,196; Notes: Appalachian State eliminated Boxscore

Friday, May 22 6:59 pm
Team	1	2	3	4	5	6	7	8	9	R	H	E
#4 Western Carolina	0	0	1	0	0	1	0	1	3	6	9	2
#8 Furman	0	4	0	2	0	1	0	0	X	7	10	1
WP: J.P. Goldsberry LP: Mike Tavernier; Home runs: WCU: Rollison; FU: None; Attendance: 1,772; Notes: Furman eliminated Boxscore

=== Round Four ===
Saturday, May 23 9:02 am
Team	1	2	3	4	5	6	7	8	9	R	H	E
#3 The Citadel	1	1	0	0	1	0	1	1	0	5	10	0
#1 Elon	0	0	0	0	0	0	1	0	0	1	5	3
WP: Asher Wojciechowski LP: Tom Porter; Home runs: Cid: None; EU: Greene; Attendance: 1,235; Boxscore

Saturday, May 23 1:00 pm
Team	1	2	3	4	5	6	7	8	9	R	H	E
#8 Furman	0	0	0	0	1	0	0	3	0	4	5	3
#2 Georgia Southern	1	4	2	0	3	1	0	5	X	16	15	1
WP: Matt Murray LP: Marc DeDecker; Home runs: FU: Wright, Bowles; GSU: Lewis; Attendance: 1,809; Notes: Furman eliminated Boxscore

Saturday, May 23 5:00 pm
Team	1	2	3	4	5	6	7	8	9	R	H	E
#1 Elon	0	0	1	1	0	4	2	0	0	8	8	1
#3 The Citadel	0	0	1	2	0	0	2	2	0	7	17	1
WP: Jordan Darnell LP: T.J. Clarkson Sv: Thomas Girdwood; Home runs: EU: CAustin, Melillo, Cid: Orvin, RJones 2, McGuiness; Attendance: 1,718; Notes: The Citadel eliminated Boxscore

=== Final ===
Sunday, May 24 2:08 pm
Team	1	2	3	4	5	6	7	8	9	R	H	E
#2 Georgia Southern	0	0	0	0	0	3	3	0	1	7	8	0
#1 Elon	0	0	0	0	0	0	0	1	2	3	9	1
WP: Chris Mederos LP: J.D. Reichenbach; Home runs: GSU: Blackburn; EU: None; Attendance: 2,388; Notes: Georgia Southern wins Boxscore

== All-Tournament Team ==
Position	Player	School
SP	Asher Wojciechowski	The Citadel
SP	Chris Maderos	Georgia Southern
RP	Thomas Girdwood	Elon
C	Richard Jones	The Citadel
1B	David Towarnicky	Appalachian State
2B	Marcus Rose	Furman
SS	Brent Greer	Western Carolina
3B	Chase Austin	Elon
OF	Sonny Meade	The Citadel
OF	Pat Irvine	Elon
OF	Ty Wright	Georgia Southern
DH	Kyle Blackburn	Georgia Southern

Walt Nadzak Award, Tournament Most Outstanding Player
Kyle Blackburn
Georgia Southern
