= The Citadel Bulldogs baseball, 2000–2009 =

American college baseball seasons

The Citadel Bulldogs baseball teams represented The Citadel, The Military College of South Carolina in Charleston, South Carolina, United States in the sport of college baseball in the NCAA Division I Southern Conference. The program was established in 1899, and has continuously fielded a team since 1947. Their primary rivals are College of Charleston, Furman and VMI.

== 2000 ==
2000 The Citadel Bulldogs baseball

SoCon Regular season Champion
- Conference: Southern Conference
- Record: 39–20 (23–7 SoCon)
- Head coach: Fred Jordan (9th season)
- Home stadium: Joseph P. Riley Jr. Park

2000 Southern Conference baseball standings
	Conf.				Overall
Team	W		L	PCT	W		L	PCT
Georgia Southern ‍†‍‡‍^{y}	23	–	7	.767	38	–	22	.633
The Citadel ‍†‍‍	23	–	7	.767	39	–	20	.661
UNC Greensboro ‍‍‍	20	–	9	.690	34	–	24	.586
Furman ‍‍‍	15	–	13	.536	27	–	31	.466
East Tennessee State ‍‍‍	15	–	15	.500	21	–	31	.404
College of Charleston ‍‍‍	14	–	15	.483	28	–	28	.500
Davidson ‍‍‍	14	–	15	.483	26	–	28	.481
Appalachian State ‍‍‍	11	–	17	.393	17	–	38	.309
VMI ‍‍‍	11	–	19	.367	19	–	30	.388
Western Carolina ‍‍‍	8	–	22	.267	15	–	38	.283
Wofford ‍‍‍	7	–	22	.241	16	–	38	.296
† – Conference champion ‡ – SoCon Tournament champion y – Invited to the NCAA tournament As of June 30, 2000; Rankings from Collegiate Baseball

=== Roster ===
2000 The Citadel Bulldogs roster
Pitchers: - Randy Corn - Sophomore; - Eric Talbert - Junior; - T. A. Fulmer - Junior	Catchers Infielders: - Chip Cannon - Freshman; - Jonathan Ellis - Freshman; - Philip Hartig - Junior; - Dallas McPherson - Junior	Outfielders: - Chris Morris - Senior; - Ron Colvard - Senior; - T. W. Mincey - Senior

=== Coaches ===
2000 The Citadel Bulldogs baseball coaching staff
- Fred Jordan - Head coach - 9th year
- Dan McDonnell - Assistant coach - 8th year
- Chris Lemonis - Assistant coach - 6th year

=== Schedule ===
2000 The Citadel Bulldogs baseball game log
Regular season

February
Date	Opponent	Site/stadium	Score	Win	Loss	Save	Attendance	Overall record	SoCon Record
Feb 11	Maryland*	Joseph P. Riley Jr. Park • Charleston, SC (Trademark Properties Classic)	W 7–2	Colvard	Hammond	None		1–0	
Feb 12	NC State*	Joseph P. Riley Jr. Park • Charleston, SC (Trademark Properties Classic)	W 2–1	McPherson	Combs	Morgan		2–0	
Feb 13	South Carolina*	Joseph P. Riley Jr. Park • Charleston, SC (Trademark Properties Classic)	L 2–4	Gronkiewicz	Bunn	Bascuas		2–1	
Feb 18	West Virginia*	Joseph P. Riley Jr. Park • Charleston, SC (Winn-Dixie Shootout)	W 7–5	Fulmer	Rhodes	Morgan		3–1	
Feb 19	St. John's*	Joseph P. Riley Jr. Park • Charleston, SC (Winn-Dixie Shootout)	W 4–3	McPherson	Niebling	Morgan		4–1	
Feb 20	Tennessee*	Joseph P. Riley Jr. Park • Charleston, SC (Winn-Dixie Shootout)	L 3–5	DeJong	Corn	None		4–2	
Feb 25	vs Xavier*	John Sessions Stadium • Jacksonville, FL (Kennel Club Classic)	W 11–4	Colvard	Wiggers	None		5–2	
Feb 26	vs Western Michigan*	John Sessions Stadium • Jacksonville, FL (Kennel Club Classic)	W 21–5	Bunn	Palazeti	None		6–2	
Feb 27	at Jacksonville*	John Sessions Stadium • Jacksonville, FL (Kennel Club Classic)	L 8–9	Ryals	Morgan	None		6–3	

March
Date	Opponent	Site/stadium	Score	Win	Loss	Save	Attendance	Overall record	SoCon Record
Mar 1	Winthrop*	Joseph P. Riley Jr. Park • Charleston, SC	L 3–5	Herauf	Mincey	Colson		6–4	
Mar 4	East Tennessee State	Joseph P. Riley Jr. Park • Charleston, SC	W 9–4	McPherson	Casey	None		7–4	1–0
Mar 4	East Tennessee State	Joseph P. Riley Jr. Park • Charleston, SC	W 15–6	Bunn	Baber	Fulmer		8–4	2–0
Mar 5	East Tennessee State	Joseph P. Riley Jr. Park • Charleston, SC	W 14–0	Colvard	Carter	None		9–4	3–0
Mar 8	Coastal Carolina*	Joseph P. Riley Jr. Park • Charleston, SC	W 6–1	Mincey	Sturkie	None		10–4	
Mar 10	at Western Carolina	Hennon Stadium • Cullowhee, NC	W 8–6	McPherson	Foster	None		11–4	4–0
Mar 12	at Western Carolina	Hennon Stadium • Cullowhee, NC	W 5–10	Overbay	Bunn	None		11–5	4–1
Mar 12	at Western Carolina	Hennon Stadium • Cullowhee, NC	W 7–5	Colvard'	Basner	Morgan		12–5	5–1
Mar 14	Navy*	Joseph P. Riley Jr. Park • Charleston, SC	W 3–0	Talbert	Deafenbaugh	Morgan		13–5	
Mar 15	Navy*	Joseph P. Riley Jr. Park • Charleston, SC	W 16–3	Mincey	Pennell	None		14–5	
Mar 18	Wofford	Joseph P. Riley Jr. Park • Charleston, SC	W 3–1	McPherson	Lehr	Morgan		15–5	6–1
Mar 18	Wofford	Joseph P. Riley Jr. Park • Charleston, SC	W 22–2	Bunn	Turner	None		16–5	7–1
Mar 19	Wofford	Joseph P. Riley Jr. Park • Charleston, SC	W 15–3	Colvard	Turner	None		17–5	8–1
Mar 22	at Georgia*	Foley Field • Athens, GA	L 7–16	Sharpton	Mincey	None		17–6	
Mar 23	Howard*	Joseph P. Riley Jr. Park • Charleston, SC	W 7–2	Talbert	Fortune	None		18–6	
Mar 24	at Clemson*	Doug Kingsmore Stadium • Clemson, SC	L 3–9	Berney	McPherson	None		18–7	
Mar 25	at Clemson*	Doug Kingsmore Stadium • Clemson, SC	L 5–7	Schmidt	Bunn	Glaser		18–8	
Mar 26	at Clemson*	Doug Kingsmore Stadium • Clemson, SC	L 3–6	Harrelson	Colvard	None		18–9	
Mar 28	at NC State*	Doak Field • Raleigh, NC	W 5–4^{10}	Morgan	Caldwell	None		19–9	
Mar 31	at VMI	Patchin Field • Lexington, VA	W 13–5	McPherson	Riley	Fulmer		20–9	9–1

April
Date	Opponent	Site/stadium	Score	Win	Loss	Save	Attendance	Overall record	SoCon Record
Apr 1	at VMI	Patchin Field • Lexington, VA	L 12–14	Ostlund	Talbert	None		20–10	9–2
Apr 2	at VMI	Patchin Field • Lexington, VA	W 18–1	Colvard	Schott	None		21–10	10–2
Apr 5	at South Carolina	Sarge Frye Field • Columbia, SC	L 5–6	Wesley	Morgan	None		21–11	
Apr 7	UNC Greensboro	Joseph P. Riley Jr. Park • Charleston, SC	W 5–2	McPherson	Gordon	Morgan		22–11	11–2
Apr 8	UNC Greensboro	Joseph P. Riley Jr. Park • Charleston, SC	W 6–2	Colvard	Cable	Fulmer		23–11	12–2
Apr 9	UNC Greensboro	Joseph P. Riley Jr. Park • Charleston, SC	W 8–3	Bunn	Hancock	None		24–11	13–2
Apr 12	at Georgia Tech*	Russ Chandler Stadium • Atlanta, GA	L 3–13	Sheeter	Talbert	None		24–12	
Apr 15	at Georgia Southern	J. I. Clements Stadium • Statesboro, GA	L 6–7	Cadenhead	Morgan	None		24–13	13–3
Apr 15	at Georgia Southern	J. I. Clements Stadium • Statesboro, GA	L 8–9	Ray	Colvard	None		24–14	13–4
Apr 16	at Georgia Southern	J. I. Clements Stadium • Statesboro, GA	L 3–8	Wheeler	Bunn	None		24–15	13–5
Apr 19	at Coastal Carolina	Charles Watson Stadium • Conway, SC	L 6–9	Caster	Chafey	Kadlec		24–16	
Apr 21	Davidson	Joseph P. Riley Jr. Park • Charleston, SC	W 20–8	Fulmer	Stroker	None		25–16	14–6
Apr 22	Davidson	Joseph P. Riley Jr. Park • Charleston, SC	W 17–3	Colvard	McDonald	None		26–16	15–6
Apr 22	Davidson	Joseph P. Riley Jr. Park • Charleston, SC	W 11–5	Bunn	Self	None		27–16	16–6
Apr 25	Charleston Southern*	Joseph P. Riley Jr. Park • Charleston, SC	W 12–3	Talbert	Tyree	None		28–16	
Apr 26	at Winthrop*	Winthrop Ballpark • Rock Hill, SC	W 11–1	Fulmer	Reeves	None		29–16	
Apr 28	at College of Charleston		L 9–11	Black	Bunn	Davey		29–17	16–7
Apr 29	at College of Charleston		W 11–6	Colvard	Hocker	None		30–17	17–7
Apr 30	at College of Charleston		W 7–5	Talbert	Mau	Morgan		31–17	18–7

May
Date	Opponent	Site/stadium	Score	Win	Loss	Save	Attendance	Overall record	SoCon Record
May 6	at Furman	Latham Baseball Stadium • Greenville, SC	W 12–5	Colvard	Etheridge	None		32–17	19–7
May 6	at Furman	Latham Baseball Stadium • Greenville, SC	W 12–4	McPherson	Mastny	Fulmer		33–17	20–7
May 7	at Furman	Latham Baseball Stadium • Greenville, SC	L 7–10	David	Bunn	Rueckel		33–18	20–8
May 8	Charleston Southern	Joseph P. Riley Jr. Park • Charleston, SC	W 8–2	Mincey	Coenen	None		34–18	
May 11	Appalachian State	Joseph P. Riley Jr. Park • Charleston, SC	W 6–5	Fulmer	Wood	Morgan		35–18	21–7
May 11	Appalachian State	Joseph P. Riley Jr. Park • Charleston, SC	W 12–0	Fulmer	Blocker	None		36–18	22–7
May 12	Appalachian State	Joseph P. Riley Jr. Park • Charleston, SC	W 7–1	Talbert	Hager	None		37–18	23–7

Postseason

SoCon Tournament
Date	Opponent	Site/stadium	Score	Win	Loss	Save	Attendance	Overall record	SoConT Record
May 17	(2) Davidson	Joseph P. Riley Jr. Park • Charleston, SC	W 6–2	Colvard	Self	Fulmer		38–18	1–0
May 18	(6) College of Charleston	Joseph P. Riley Jr. Park • Charleston, SC	W 6–3	Talbert	Mau	Morgan		39–18	2–0
May 19	(1) Georgia Southern	Joseph P. Riley Jr. Park • Charleston, SC	L 3–5^{10}	Cadenhead	Corn	None		39–19	2–1
May 20	(4) Furman	Joseph P. Riley Jr. Park • Charleston, SC	L 1–11	Etheridge	Mincey	None		39–20	2–2

== 2001 ==
2001 The Citadel Bulldogs baseball

SoCon Tournament champion

Columbia Regional, 0–2
- Conference: Southern Conference
- Record: 38–24 (20–10 SoCon)
- Head coach: Fred Jordan (10th season)
- Home stadium: Joseph P. Riley Jr. Park

2001 Southern Conference baseball standings
	Conf.				Overall
Team	W		L	PCT	W		L	PCT
Georgia Southern ‍†‍‍^{y}	21	–	9	.700	42	–	20	.677
The Citadel ‍‍‡‍^{y}	20	–	10	.667	38	–	24	.613
Furman ‍‍‍	18	–	11	.621	30	–	25	.545
Western Carolina ‍‍‍	18	–	11	.621	30	–	26	.536
UNC Greensboro ‍‍‍	17	–	12	.586	31	–	28	.525
Appalachian State ‍‍‍	12	–	14	.462	21	–	32	.396
East Tennessee State ‍‍‍	13	–	17	.433	21	–	32	.396
College of Charleston ‍‍‍	10	–	16	.385	24	–	28	.462
Wofford ‍‍‍	9	–	17	.346	17	–	31	.354
Davidson ‍‍‍	10	–	20	.333	19	–	32	.373
VMI ‍‍‍	8	–	19	.296	15	–	32	.319
† – Conference champion ‡ – SoCon Tournament champion y – Invited to the NCAA tournament As of June 30, 2001; Rankings from Collegiate Baseball

=== Roster ===
2001 The Citadel Bulldogs roster
Pitchers	Catchers Infielders	Outfielders

=== Coaches ===
2001 The Citadel Bulldogs baseball coaching staff
- Fred Jordan - Head coach - 10th year
- Chris Lemonis - Assistant coach - 7th year

=== Schedule ===
2001 The Citadel Bulldogs baseball game log
Regular season

February
Date	Opponent	Site/stadium	Score	Win	Loss	Save	Overall record	SoCon Record
Feb 2	vs. Oklahoma State*	Desert Sun Stadium • Yuma, AZ	L 1–6	Merrigan	McPherson	Miller	0–1	
Feb 3	vs. UC Riverside*	Desert Sun Stadium • Yuma, AZ	L 0–12	Fernandez	Mincey	None	0–2	
Feb 4	vs. San Diego State*	Desert Sun Stadium • Yuma, AZ	L 3–5	Harrand	Fulmer	Ring	0–3	
Feb 9	Richmond*	Joseph P. Riley Jr. Park • Charleston, SC	W 7–5	McPherson	Bashman	Corn	1–3	
Feb 10	Old Dominion*	Joseph P. Riley Jr. Park • Charleston, SC	W 6–2	Pollock	Friske	Corn	2–3	
Feb 11	VCU*	Joseph P. Riley Jr. Park • Charleston, SC	W 8–4	Mincey	Bauman	None	3–3	
Feb 16	Maryland*	Joseph P. Riley Jr. Park • Charleston, SC	W 5–4^{10}	Corn	Dallmeyer	None	4–3	
Feb 17	NC State*	Joseph P. Riley Jr. Park • Charleston, SC	L 4–13	D'Amato	Fulmer	None	4–4	
Feb 18	Tennessee*	Joseph P. Riley Jr. Park • Charleston, SC	W 15–2	Talbert	Allen	None	5–4	
Feb 21	St. John's*	Joseph P. Riley Jr. Park • Charleston, SC	W 18–3	Mincey	Reid	None	6–4	
Feb 24	Connecticut*	Joseph P. Riley Jr. Park • Charleston, SC	L 4–11	Sperone	McPherson	None	6–5	
Feb 24	Connecticut*	Joseph P. Riley Jr. Park • Charleston, SC	W 10–4	Talbert	Carlson	None	7–5	
Feb 25	Connecticut*	Joseph P. Riley Jr. Park • Charleston, SC	W 6–3	Fulmer	Fulchino	Corn	8–5	

March
Date	Opponent	Site/stadium	Score	Win	Loss	Save	Overall record	SoCon Record
Mar 2	VMI	Joseph P. Riley Jr. Park • Charleston, SC	W 8–0	Talbert	Owens	None	9–5	1–0
Mar 3	VMI	Joseph P. Riley Jr. Park • Charleston, SC	W 8–1	McPherson	Liffick	None	10–5	2–0
Mar 4	VMI	Joseph P. Riley Jr. Park • Charleston, SC	W 7–2	Fulmer	Owens	None	11–5	3–0
Mar 6	William & Mary*	Joseph P. Riley Jr. Park • Charleston, SC	W 15–3	Mincey	Farr	None	12–5	
Mar 7	William & Mary*	Joseph P. Riley Jr. Park • Charleston, SC	W 12–2	Jenkins	Harris	None	13–5	
Mar 9	Georgia Southern	Joseph P. Riley Jr. Park • Charleston, SC	W 10–6	McPherson	Ray	Corn	14–5	4–0
Mar 10	Georgia Southern	Joseph P. Riley Jr. Park • Charleston, SC	W 8–2	Talbert	Lewis	Hamer	15–5	5–0
Mar 11	Georgia Southern	Joseph P. Riley Jr. Park • Charleston, SC	W 3–2	Corn	Wheeler	None	16–5	6–0
Mar 13	Butler*	Joseph P. Riley Jr. Park • Charleston, SC	W 9–3	Mincey	Phillips	None	17–5	
Mar 15	Butler*	Joseph P. Riley Jr. Park • Charleston, SC	W 5–1	Jenkins	Kugle	None	18–5	
Mar 17	at East Tennessee State	Howard Johnson Field • Johnson City, TN	W 9–6	Corn	Casey	None	19–5	7–0
Mar 17	at East Tennessee State	Howard Johnson Field • Johnson City, TN	W 18–0	Talbert	Kite	None	20–5	8–0
Mar 18	at East Tennessee State	Howard Johnson Field • Johnson City, TN	L 9–10	Sharp	Corn	None	20–6	8–1
Mar 27	at Florida State*	Dick Howser Stadium • Tallahassee, FL	L 0–3	Lynch	Talbert	Lord	20–7	
Mar 28	at Florida State*	Dick Howser Stadium • Tallahassee, FL	W 5–2	Corn	Lord	None	21–7	
Mar 31	at Davidson	T. Henry Wilson Jr. Field • Davidson, NC	W 9–1	Talbert	Self	None	22–7	9–1
Mar 31	at Davidson	T. Henry Wilson Jr. Field • Davidson, NC	L 3–4	Wells	Williams	Frend	22–8	9–2

April
Date	Opponent	Site/stadium	Score	Win	Loss	Save	Overall record	SoCon Record
Apr 1	at Davidson	T. Henry Wilson Jr. Field • Davidson, NC	L 13–15	Frend	Williams	None	22–9	9–3
Apr 3	at Charleston Southern*	Buccaneer Ballpark • North Charleston, SC	L 3–4	Coenen	Jenkins	Humbert	22–10	
Apr 6	Western Carolina	Joseph P. Riley Jr. Park • Charleston, SC	W 7–0	Talbert	Basner	None	23–10	10–3
Apr 7	Western Carolina	Joseph P. Riley Jr. Park • Charleston, SC	L 6–7	R. Foster	Corn	None	23–11	10–4
Apr 8	Western Carolina	Joseph P. Riley Jr. Park • Charleston, SC	L 6–12	S. Foster	Fulmer	None	23–12	10–5
Apr 10	South Carolina*	Joseph P. Riley Jr. Park • Charleston, SC	L 7–12	Price	Williams	Gronkiewicz	23–13	
Apr 11	at South Carolina*	Sarge Frye Field • Columbia, SC	L 2–4	Taylor	Mincey	Gronkiewicz	23–14	
Apr 13	at Wofford	Duncan Park • Spartanburg, SC	W 5–4	Talbert	McGill	Hamer	24–14	11–5
Apr 14	at Wofford	Duncan Park • Spartanburg, SC	W 9–7	McPherson	Osterman	Corn	25–14	12–5
Apr 14	at Wofford	Duncan Park • Spartanburg, SC	W 7–4	Fulmer	Lehr	Corn	26–14	13–5
Apr 17	at Coastal Carolina*	Charles Watson Stadium • Conway, SC	L 7–8^{12}	Carter	Corn	None	26–15	
Apr 18	Winthrop*	Joseph P. Riley Jr. Park • Charleston, SC	L 7–9	Herauf	Mincey	Chenard	26–16	
Apr 21	at Appalachian State	Red Lackey Field • Boone, NC	W 10–8	Corn	Blocker	None	27–16	14–5
Apr 21	at Appalachian State	Red Lackey Field • Boone, NC	L 3–9	Hager	McPherson	None	27–17	14–6
Apr 22	at Appalachian State	Red Lackey Field • Boone, NC	W 13–10	Mincey	Lemonds	Corn	28–17	15–6
Apr 24	Charleston Southern*	Joseph P. Riley Jr. Park • Charleston, SC	L 4–6	Coenan	McPherson	Humbert	28–18	
Apr 25	at Winthrop*	Winthrop Ballpark • Rock Hill, SC	W 7–3	Hamer	Colson	Corn	29–18	
Apr 28	Furman	Joseph P. Riley Jr. Park • Charleston, SC	L 1–2	Mastny	Talbert	Purvis	29–19	15–7
Apr 28	Furman	Joseph P. Riley Jr. Park • Charleston, SC	W 3–0	Fulmer	Etheridge	Corn	30–19	16–7
Apr 29	Furman	Joseph P. Riley Jr. Park • Charleston, SC	L 4–6	David	McPherson	None	30–20	16–8

May
Date	Opponent	Site/stadium	Score	Win	Loss	Save	Overall record	SoCon Record
May 4	at UNC Greensboro	UNCG Baseball Stadium • Greensboro, NC	W 6–5^{12}	Corn	Cloninger	None	31–20	17–8
May 5	at UNC Greensboro	UNCG Baseball Stadium • Greensboro, NC	L 3–4	Cable	Hamer	None	31–21	17–9
May 6	at UNC Greensboro	UNCG Baseball Stadium • Greensboro, NC	W 8–4	Fulmer	Toler	Mincey	32–21	18–9
May 10	College of Charleston	Joseph P. Riley Jr. Park • Charleston, SC	W 4–3	Corn	Hutchings	None	33–21	19–9
May 11	College of Charleston	Joseph P. Riley Jr. Park • Charleston, SC	W 9–4	Williams	Mau	Mincey	34–21	20–9
May 12	College of Charleston	Joseph P. Riley Jr. Park • Charleston, SC	L 1–9	Rackers	Fulmer	None	34–22	20–10

Postseason

SoCon Tournament
Date	Opponent	Site/stadium	Score	Win	Loss	Save	Overall record	SoConT Record
May 16	(7) East Tennessee State	Joseph P. Riley Jr. Park • Charleston, SC	W 3–2	Corn	Casey	None	35–22	1–0
May 17	(6) Appalachian State	Joseph P. Riley Jr. Park • Charleston, SC	W 5–3	Williams	Lemonds	Corn	36–22	2–0
May 18	(1) Georgia Southern	Joseph P. Riley Jr. Park • Charleston, SC	W 3–2	Fulmer	Wheeler	Corn	37–22	3–0
May 19	(5) UNC Greensboro	Joseph P. Riley Jr. Park • Charleston, SC	W 5–3	Mincey	Hancock	Corn	38–22	4–0

NCAA Columbia Regional
Date	Opponent	Site/stadium	Score	Win	Loss	Save	Overall record	NCAAT record
May 25	at (2) South Carolina	Sarge Frye Field • Columbia, SC	L 0–16	Bouknight	Talbert	None	38–23	0–1
May 26	vs (4) Princeton	Sarge Frye Field • Columbia, SC	L 6–11	Boehle	Mincey	None	38–24	0–2

=== Rankings ===
Ranking movements Legend: ██ Increase in ranking ██ Decrease in ranking — = Not ranked
	Week																			
Poll	Pre	1	2	3	4	5	6	7	8	9	10	11	12	13	14	15	16	17	18	Final
Coaches'		*																		—
Baseball America																				—
Collegiate Baseball^	27	—	—	—	—	—	—	21	18	23	—	—	—	—	—	—	—	—	—	—
NCBWA†																				—

^ Collegiate Baseball ranked 40 teams in their preseason poll, but only ranked 30 teams weekly during the season.
† NCBWA ranks 30 teams in their preseason poll, but only ranks 25 teams weekly during the season.
* A new poll was not released for this week, so for comparison purposes, the previous week's ranking is inserted in this week's slot.

== 2002 ==
2002 The Citadel Bulldogs baseball

SoCon Regular season Champion
- Conference: Southern Conference
- Record: 31–26 (22–8 SoCon)
- Head coach: Fred Jordan (11th season)
- Home stadium: Joseph P. Riley Jr. Park

2002 Southern Conference baseball standings
	Conf.				Overall
Team	W		L	PCT	W		L	PCT
The Citadel ‍†‍‍	22	–	8	.733	31	–	26	.544
Western Carolina ‍‍‍	20	–	10	.667	33	–	23	.589
College of Charleston ‍‍‍	19	–	11	.633	36	–	22	.621
Georgia Southern ‍‍‡‍^{y}	18	–	11	.621	39	–	25	.609
UNC Greensboro ‍‍‍	17	–	11	.607	33	–	22	.600
Furman ‍‍‍	14	–	16	.467	26	–	34	.433
Wofford ‍‍‍	14	–	16	.467	26	–	31	.456
East Tennessee State ‍‍‍	13	–	16	.448	23	–	36	.390
Davidson ‍‍‍	13	–	16	.448	21	–	29	.420
Appalachian State ‍‍‍	10	–	19	.345	16	–	34	.320
VMI ‍‍‍	1	–	27	.036	10	–	41	.196
† – Conference champion ‡ – SoCon Tournament champion y – Invited to the NCAA tournament As of June 30, 2002; Rankings from Collegiate Baseball

=== Roster ===
2002 The Citadel Bulldogs roster
Pitchers: Beckham; R. Corn; Ellis; Fulmer; Hamer; Jenkins; Pollock; Sprouse; Talbert; Williams	Catchers: Coker; Randall; Infielders: Ard; Aughey; Cannon; J. Corn; Griffin; Mainor	Outfielders: Dantzler; Dean; Phillips; Stackley

=== Coaches ===
2002 The Citadel Bulldogs baseball coaching staff
- Fred Jordan - Head coach - 11th year
- Chris Lemonis - Assistant coach - 8th year
- David Beckley - Assistant coach - 1st year

=== Schedule ===
2002 The Citadel Bulldogs baseball game log
Regular season

February
Date	Opponent	Site/stadium	Score	Win	Loss	Save	Overall record	SoCon Record
Feb 15	NC State*	Joseph P. Riley Jr. Park • Charleston, SC (Crab House Challenge)	W 3–2	Hamer	Caldwell	Corn	1–0	
Feb 16	Maryland*	Joseph P. Riley Jr. Park • Charleston, SC (Crab House Challenge)	L 6–8	Lyons	Ellis	Beck	1–1	
Feb 17	NC State*	Joseph P. Riley Jr. Park • Charleston, SC (Crab House Challenge)	L 8–14–	Davidson	Williams	None	1–2	
Feb 17	Richmond*	Joseph P. Riley Jr. Park • Charleston, SC (Crab House Challenge)	L 3–4	Givens	Sprouse	Cronin	1–3	
Feb 22	West Virginia*	Joseph P. Riley Jr. Park • Charleston, SC (Berkeley Electric Co-op Shootout)	W 1–0	Hamer	Biggs	Corn	2–3	
Feb 23	Virginia Tech*	Joseph P. Riley Jr. Park • Charleston, SC (Berkeley Electric Co-op Shootout)	L 3–12	Runyon	Talbert	Dalton	2–4	
Feb 24	Virginia*	Joseph P. Riley Jr. Park • Charleston, SC (Berkeley Electric Co-op Shootout)	L 4–5	Hickman	Hamer	Marinak	2–5	

March
Date	Opponent	Site/stadium	Score	Win	Loss	Save	Overall record	SoCon Record
Mar 1	at Jacksonville*	John Sessions Stadium • Jacksonville, FL	L 1–2	Williams	Hamer	None	2–6	
Mar 5	Charleston Southern*	Joseph P. Riley Jr. Park • Charleston, SC	W 2–1	Fulmer	Bissell	None	3–6	
Mar 6	at Coastal Carolina*	Charles Watson Stadium • Conway, SC	W 2–1	Hamer	Carter	Corn	4–6	
Mar 8	Davidson	Joseph P. Riley Jr. Park • Charleston, SC	W 4–3	Hamer	E. Wells	Corn	5–6	1–0
Mar 9	Davidson	Joseph P. Riley Jr. Park • Charleston, SC	W 8–6	Corn	Dellinger	None	6–6	2–0
Mar 10	Davidson	Joseph P. Riley Jr. Park • Charleston, SC	W 5–3	Hamer	M. Wells	Corn	7–6	3–0
Mar 13	Pace*	Joseph P. Riley Jr. Park • Charleston, SC	W 11–2	Talbert	Macom	None	8–6	
Mar 13	Pace*	Joseph P. Riley Jr. Park • Charleston, SC	L 1–3	Malgri	Williams	None	8–7	
Mar 15	Appalachian State	Joseph P. Riley Jr. Park • Charleston, SC	W 9–1	Hamer	Chapman	None	9–7	4–0
Mar 16	Appalachian State	Joseph P. Riley Jr. Park • Charleston, SC	W 10–2	Fulmer	Shiplett	Corn	10–7	5–0
Mar 17	Appalachian State	Joseph P. Riley Jr. Park • Charleston, SC	W 8–4	Ellis	Kline	None	11–7	6–0
Mar 19	at Florida State*	Dick Howser Stadium • Tallahassee, FL	L 0–4	LaMacchia	Williams	None	11–8	
Mar 20	at Florida State*	Dick Howser Stadium • Tallahassee, FL	L 3–11	Davidson	Sprouse	None	11–9	
Mar 22	at College of Charleston	CofC Baseball Stadium at Patriot's Point • Mount Pleasant, SC	L 0–10	Johnson	Jenkins	None	11–10	6–1
Mar 23	at College of Charleston	CofC Baseball Stadium at Patriot's Point • Mount Pleasant, SC	W 14–7	Hamer	Rackers	Corn	12–10	7–1
Mar 24	at College of Charleston	CofC Baseball Stadium at Patriot's Point • Mount Pleasant, SC	L 8–9	Rhue	Talbert	Thompson	12–11	7–2
Mar 27	South Carolina*	Joseph P. Riley Jr. Park • Charleston, SC	W 5–1	Williams	Evans	None	13–11	
Mar 28	East Tennessee State	Joseph P. Riley Jr. Park • Charleston, SC	W 3–2	Jenkins	Sharp	Corn	14–11	8–2
Mar 29	East Tennessee State	Joseph P. Riley Jr. Park • Charleston, SC	W 6–0 (Note: T. A. Fulmer pitched a no-hitter against East Tennessee State.)	Fulmer	Foley	None	15–11	9–2
Mar 30	East Tennessee State	Joseph P. Riley Jr. Park • Charleston, SC	W 8–2	Talbert	Turner	None	16–11	10–2

April
Date	Opponent	Site/stadium	Score	Win	Loss	Save	Overall record	SoCon Record
Apr 3	Charleston Southern*	Joseph P. Riley Jr. Park • Charleston, SC	W 8–2	Williams	Fasulo	None	17–11	
Apr 5	at Western Carolina	Hennon Stadium • Cullowhee, NC	W 8–3	Jenkins	Burton	None	18–11	11–2
Apr 6	at Western Carolina	Hennon Stadium • Cullowhee, NC	W 7–0	Fulmer	Foley	None	19–11	12–2
Apr 7	at Western Carolina	Hennon Stadium • Cullowhee, NC	L 1–2	S. Foster	Talbert	R. Foster	19–12	12–3
Apr 10	at South Carolina*	Sarge Frye Field • Columbia, SC	L 0–2	Spigner	Williams	Taylor	19–13	
Apr 12	UNC Greensboro	Joseph P. Riley Jr. Park • Charleston, SC	L 0–5	Michael	Fulmer	None	19–14	12–4
Apr 13	UNC Greensboro	Joseph P. Riley Jr. Park • Charleston, SC	W 4–1	Talbert	Metzger	Corn	20–14	13–4
Apr 14	UNC Greensboro	Joseph P. Riley Jr. Park • Charleston, SC	W 4–1	Jenkins	Cloninger	Corn	21–14	14–4
Apr 17	at Charleston Southern*	Buccaneer Ballpark • North Charleston, SC	L 13–18	Rhodes	Pollock	None	21–15	
Apr 19	at Georgia Southern	J. I. Clements Stadium • Statesboro, GA	W 9–2	Fulmer	Dove	None	22–15	15–4
Apr 20	at Georgia Southern	J. I. Clements Stadium • Statesboro, GA	L 3–12	Lewis	Jenkins	None	22–16	15–5
Apr 21	at Georgia Southern	J. I. Clements Stadium • Statesboro, GA	W 16–4	'Talbert '	Rogers	None	23–16	16–5
Apr 24	at Winthrop*	Winthrop Ballpark • Rock Hill, SC	L 0–5	Terry	Sprouse	None	23–17	
Apr 27	Wofford	Joseph P. Riley Jr. Park • Charleston, SC	L 8–4	Osterman	Fulmer	Lehr	23–18	16–6
Apr 27	Wofford	Joseph P. Riley Jr. Park • Charleston, SC	W 13–0	Jenkins	Halligan	None	24–18	17–6
Apr 28	Wofford	Joseph P. Riley Jr. Park • Charleston, SC	W 7–2	Talbert	Lehr	Corn	25–18	18–6
Apr 30	Coastal Carolina*	Joseph P. Riley Jr. Park • Charleston, SC	L 3–10	Sturge	Williams	None	25–19	

May
Date	Opponent	Site/stadium	Score	Win	Loss	Save	Overall record	SoCon Record
May 4	at Furman	Latham Baseball Stadium • Greenville, SC	L 0–5	Mastny	Fulmer	None	25–20	18–7
May 5	at Furman	Latham Baseball Stadium • Greenville, SC	W 7–5	Hamer	Rueckel	Corn	26–20	19–7
May 5	at Furman	Latham Baseball Stadium • Greenville, SC	L 0–5	Stoval	Talbert	None	26–21	19–8
May 7	Winthrop*	Joseph P. Riley Jr. Park • Charleston, SC	L 1–2	Chenard	Williams	None	26–22	
May 10	at NC State*	Doak Field • Raleigh, NC	L 6–7	Ross	Jenkins	None	26–23	
May 11	at NC State*	Doak Field • Raleigh, NC	L 2–8	Cretarolo	Fulmer	Combs	26–24	
May 15	at Charleston Southern*	Buccaneer Ballpark • North Charleston, SC	W 16–6	Ellis	Bissell	None	27–24	
May 17	at VMI	Patchin Field • Lexington, VA	W 12–2	Fulmer	Acors	None	28–24	20–8
May 17	at VMI	Patchin Field • Lexington, VA	W 12–4	Jenkins	Litwin	Hamer	29–24	21–8
May 18	at VMI	Patchin Field • Lexington, VA	W 11–5	Talbert	Hendrix	None	30–24	22–8

Postseason

SoCon Tournament
Date	Opponent	Site/stadium	Score	Win	Loss	Save	Overall record	SoConT Record
May 22	East Tennessee State	Joseph P. Riley Jr. Park • Charleston, SC	W 7–5	Hamer	Casey	Corn	31–24	1–0
May 23	Georgia Southern	Joseph P. Riley Jr. Park • Charleston, SC	L 2–4	Lewis	Talbert	None	31–25	1–1
May 24	Furman	Joseph P. Riley Jr. Park • Charleston, SC	L 0–6	Stovall	Jenkins	None	31–26	1–2

== 2003 ==
2003 The Citadel Bulldogs baseball
- Conference: Southern Conference
- Record: 32–25 (19–11 SoCon)
- Head coach: Fred Jordan (12th season)
- Home stadium: Joseph P. Riley Jr. Park

2003 Southern Conference baseball standings
	Conf.				Overall
Team	W		L	PCT	W		L	PCT
Western Carolina ‍†‍‡‍^{y}	22	–	8	.733	43	–	21	.672
Georgia Southern ‍‍‍	19	–	10	.655	39	–	21	.650
The Citadel ‍‍‍	19	–	11	.633	32	–	25	.561
UNC Greensboro ‍‍‍	17	–	13	.567	39	–	21	.650
Furman ‍‍‍	17	–	13	.567	32	–	24	.571
College of Charleston ‍‍‍	17	–	13	.567	31	–	27	.534
VMI ‍‍‍	16	–	14	.533	24	–	28	.462
Davidson ‍‍‍	12	–	17	.414	18	–	27	.400
East Tennessee State ‍‍‍	9	–	20	.310	15	–	36	.294
Appalachian State ‍‍‍	8	–	22	.267	14	–	36	.280
Wofford ‍‍‍	7	–	22	.241	9	–	40	.184
† – Conference champion ‡ – SoCon Tournament champion y – Invited to the NCAA tournament As of June 30, 2003; Rankings from Collegiate Baseball

=== Roster ===
2003 The Citadel Bulldogs roster
Pitchers: 3 - Mark Egleton; 5 - John Ellis; 6 - Shannon Sprouse; 9 - John Pollock; 10 - Ken Egleton; 14 - Griff Beckham; 17 - Ryan Owens; 25 - Evan Burgess; 29 - Matt Hamer	Catchers: 4 - Will Coker; 19 - Jason Randall; Infielders: 1 - Chris Ard; 12 - Matt Matulia; 15 - Chris Altman; 16 - Chip Cannon; 21 - Jon Aughey	Outfielders: 7 - Josh Stackley; 8 - Brook Dantzler; 11 - Matt Covington; 23 - Andy Phillips; 24 - Trent Weathers

=== Coaches ===
2003 The Citadel Bulldogs baseball coaching staff
- Fred Jordan - Head coach - 12th year
- Chris Lemonis - Assistant coach - 9th year
- David Beckley - Assistant coach - 2nd year

=== Schedule ===
2003 The Citadel Bulldogs baseball game log
Regular season

February
Date	Opponent	Site/stadium	Score	Win	Loss	Save	Overall record	SoCon Record
Feb 14	Tennessee*	Joseph P. Riley Jr. Park • Charleston, SC (ESPN Radio Shootout)	L 4–9	Wesley	Sprouse	None	0–1	
Feb 15	Vanderbilt*	Joseph P. Riley Jr. Park • Charleston, SC (ESPN Radio Shootout)	L 3–4	Lewis	Phillips	None	0–2	
Feb 19	South Carolina*	Joseph P. Riley Jr. Park • Charleston, SC (Crab House Challenge)	L 5–7	Rawl	Owens	Campbell	0–3	
Feb 21	Kentucky*	Joseph P. Riley Jr. Park • Charleston, SC (Crab House Challenge)	W 3–1	Hamer	Wade	Sprouse	1–3	
Feb 23	NC State*	Joseph P. Riley Jr. Park • Charleston, SC (Crab House Challenge)	W 15–2	Ellis	Cretarolo	None	2–3	
Feb 28	at Miami (FL)*	Mark Light Field • Coral Gables, FL	W 8–7	K. Egleton	Lane	Sprouse	3–3	

March
Date	Opponent	Site/stadium	Score	Win	Loss	Save	Overall record	SoCon Record
Mar 1	at Miami (FL)*	Mark Light Field • Coral Gables, FL	L 1–6	Bongiovanni	Ellis	None	3–4	
Mar 2	at Miami (FL)*	Mark Light Field • Coral Gables, FL	L 6–14	Camardese	Owens	None	3–5	
Mar 4	North Carolina A&T*	Joseph P. Riley Jr. Park • Charleston, SC	W 12–9	Hamer	Summers	Sprouse	4–5	
Mar 5	North Carolina A&T*	Joseph P. Riley Jr. Park • Charleston, SC	W 2–1	Sprouse	Hauff	None	5–5	
Mar 7	at Western Carolina	Hennon Stadium • Cullowhee, NC	L 7–8^{10}	Hawk	K. Egleton	None	5–6	0–1
Mar 8	at Western Carolina	Hennon Stadium • Cullowhee, NC	W 7–3	Ellis	Basner	None	6–6	1–1
Mar 9	at Western Carolina	Hennon Stadium • Cullowhee, NC	L 5–8	Barnes	Owens	None	6–7	1–2
Mar 11	at NC State*	Doak Field • Raleigh, NC	L 3–4	Sterry	M. Egleton	Devine	6–8	
Mar 15	Wofford	Joseph P. Riley Jr. Park • Charleston, SC	W 12–2	Ellis	Casey	None	7–8	2–2
Mar 15	Wofford	Joseph P. Riley Jr. Park • Charleston, SC	W 11–0	K. Egleton	Cole	None	8–8	3–2
Mar 16	Wofford	Joseph P. Riley Jr. Park • Charleston, SC	W 5–0	Owens	Rampey	None	9–8	4–2
Mar 18	Lafayette*	Joseph P. Riley Jr. Park • Charleston, SC	W 7–0	M. Egleton	Phelan	None	10–8	
Mar 19	Charleston Southern*	Joseph P. Riley Jr. Park • Charleston, SC	W 20–2	Phillips	Fasulo	None	11–8	
Mar 22	at Appalachian State	Beaver Field at Jim and Bettie Smith Stadium • Boone, NC	W 10–4	Ellis	Peterson	Hamer	12–8	5–2
Mar 22	at Appalachian State	Beaver Field at Jim and Bettie Smith Stadium • Boone, NC	W 5–4	Hamer	Norton	Sprouse	13–8	6–2
Mar 23	at Appalachian State	Beaver Field at Jim and Bettie Smith Stadium • Boone, NC	W 12–8	Sprouse	Reeder	None	14–8	7–2
Mar 25	at Jacksonville*	John Sessions Stadium • Jacksonville, FL	L 1–3	Robinson	Cannon	Murdock	14–9	
Mar 26	at Florida State*	Dick Howser Stadium • Tallahassee, FL	L 2–10	Simon	M. Egleton	None	14–10	
Mar 28	College of Charleston	Joseph P. Riley Jr. Park • Charleston, SC	W 9–2	Ellis	Price	None	15–10	8–2
Mar 29	College of Charleston	Joseph P. Riley Jr. Park • Charleston, SC	W 19–3	K. Egleton	Fender	None	16–10	9–2
Mar 30	College of Charleston	Joseph P. Riley Jr. Park • Charleston, SC	W 9–8	Sprouse	Morris	None	17–10	10–2

April
Date	Opponent	Site/stadium	Score	Win	Loss	Save	Overall record	SoCon Record
Apr 1	at North Carolina A&T*	World War Memorial Stadium • Greensboro, NC	W 12–5	Covington	Hauff	Owens	18–10	
Apr 2	at North Carolina A&T*	World War Memorial Stadium • Greensboro, NC	W 7–2	Burgess	Peascoe	None	19–10	
Apr 4	at Coastal Carolina*	Charles Watson Stadium • Conway, SC	L 6–11	Carter	Ellis	None	19–11	
Apr 5	Coastal Carolina*	Joseph P. Riley Jr. Park • Charleston, SC	W 8–7^{10}	Sprouse	Waack	None	20–11	
Apr 6	Coastal Carolina*	Joseph P. Riley Jr. Park • Charleston, SC	L 3–16	Sturge	Cannon	None	20–12	
Apr 11	at Davidson	T. Henry Wilson Jr. Field • Davidson, NC	L 4–6	Carter	Ellis	Akin	20–13	10–3
Apr 12	at Davidson	T. Henry Wilson Jr. Field • Davidson, NC	L 1–3	Wolpert	K. Egleton	Akin	20–14	10–4
Apr 13	at Davidson	T. Henry Wilson Jr. Field • Davidson, NC	L 5–8	Dellinger	Sprouse	None	20–15	10–5
Apr 16	at Winthrop*	Winthrop Ballpark • Rock Hill, SC	L 5–6	Bean	Burgess	Plexico	20–16	
Apr 18	East Tennessee State	Joseph P. Riley Jr. Park • Charleston, SC	L 1–2	Hyder	Ellis	McKenzie	20–17	10–6
Apr 19	East Tennessee State	Joseph P. Riley Jr. Park • Charleston, SC	W 9–4	K. Egleton	Calicutt	Phillips	21–17	11–6
Apr 20	East Tennessee State	Joseph P. Riley Jr. Park • Charleston, SC	W 5–4	Sprouse	McKenzie	None	22–17	12–6
Apr 23	Winthrop*	Joseph P. Riley Jr. Park • Charleston, SC	W 10–3	Beckham	Honce	None	23–17	
Apr 25	at Furman	Latham Baseball Stadium • Greenville, SC	W 6–4	Hamer	Hurst	Sprouse	24–17	13–6
Apr 26	at Furman	Latham Baseball Stadium • Greenville, SC	L 8–15	Funk	K. Egleton	None	24–18	13–7
Apr 27	at Furman	Latham Baseball Stadium • Greenville, SC	W 5–1	Cannon	Stallsmith	None	25–18	14–7
Apr 30	at Coastal Carolina	Charles Watson Stadium • Conway, SC	L 2–4	Carter	Beckham	Hurry	25–19	

May
Date	Opponent	Site/stadium	Score	Win	Loss	Save	Overall record	SoCon Record
May 3	Georgia Southern	Joseph P. Riley Jr. Park • Charleston, SC	L 2–4	Dove	Ellis	Cogswell	25–20	14–8
May 4	Georgia Southern	Joseph P. Riley Jr. Park • Charleston, SC	W 10–7	Burgess	Rogers	Sprouse	26–20	15–8
May 5	Georgia Southern	Joseph P. Riley Jr. Park • Charleston, SC	L 6–10	Carroll	Cannon	Cogswell	26–21	15–9
May 7	Charleston Southern*	Joseph P. Riley Jr. Park • Charleston, SC	W 7–5	Beckham	Fasulo	Sprouse	27–21	
May 9	at UNC Greensboro	UNCG Baseball Stadium • Greensboro, NC	L 9–12	Santos	Hamer	None	27–22	15–10
May 10	at UNC Greensboro	UNCG Baseball Stadium • Greensboro, NC	W 9–4	K. Egleton	Metzger	None	28–22	16–10
May 11	at UNC Greensboro	UNCG Baseball Stadium • Greensboro, NC	W 11–6	Cannon	Santos	None	29–22	17–10
May 14	at South Carolina	Sarge Frye Field • Columbia, SC	W 7–4	Hamer	Reeves	None	30–22	
May 17	VMI	Joseph P. Riley Jr. Park • Charleston, SC	W 10–0	Cannon	Thoms	None	31–22	18–10
May 17	VMI	Joseph P. Riley Jr. Park • Charleston, SC	L 6–7^{11}	Hollenbeck	Sprouse	None	31–23	18–11
May 18	VMI	Joseph P. Riley Jr. Park • Charleston, SC	W 5–1	K. Egleton	Harper	Beckham	32–23	19–11

Postseason

SoCon Tournament
Date	Opponent	Site/stadium	Score	Win	Loss	Save	Overall record	SoConT Record
May 21	College of Charleston	Joseph P. Riley Jr. Park • Charleston, SC	L 2–8	Soale	Cannon	None	32–24	0–1
May 22	VMI	Joseph P. Riley Jr. Park • Charleston, SC	L 1–2	Hendrix	Sprouse	None	32–25	0–2

== 2004 ==
2004 The Citadel Bulldogs baseball

SoCon Tournament champion

Columbia Regional, 1–2
- Conference: Southern Conference
- Record: 39–28 (21–9 SoCon)
- Head coach: Fred Jordan (13th season)
- Home stadium: Joseph P. Riley Jr. Park

2004 Southern Conference baseball standings
	Conf.				Overall
Team	W		L	PCT	W		L	PCT
#29 College of Charleston †^{y} ‍‍‍	25	–	5	.833	47	–	16	.746
The Citadel ‍‍‡‍^{y}	21	–	9	.700	39	–	28	.582
Georgia Southern ‍‍‍	21	–	9	.700	34	–	25	.576
Elon ‍‍‍	17	–	13	.567	31	–	28	.525
UNC Greensboro ‍‍‍	16	–	14	.533	33	–	21	.611
East Tennessee State ‍‍‍	15	–	15	.500	28	–	30	.483
Davidson ‍‍‍	13	–	17	.433	20	–	33	.377
Western Carolina ‍‍‍	12	–	18	.400	28	–	31	.475
Furman ‍‍‍	11	–	19	.367	21	–	33	.389
Wofford ‍‍‍	8	–	22	.267	17	–	30	.362
Appalachian State ‍‍‍	6	–	24	.200	10	–	43	.189
† – Conference champion ‡ – SoCon Tournament champion y – Invited to the NCAA tournament As of June 30, 2004; Rankings from Collegiate Baseball

=== Roster ===
2004 The Citadel Bulldogs roster
Pitchers: 5 - Jonathan Ellis; 8 - Ryan Howe; 10 - Ken Egleton; 14 - Griff Beckham; 17 - Ryan Owens; 18 - Michael McLaurin; 19 - Justin Smith; 25 - Evan Burgess; 27 - Shannon Sprouse; 28 - Jamie Maxwell; 29 - Stephen Williams	Infielders: 1 - Chris Ard; 2 - Tripp Cappelmann; 3 - Mark Egleton; 9 - Zach Brown; 12 - Matt Matulia; 15 - Chris Altman; 16 - Chip Cannon; 21 - Jon Aughey	Outfielders: 6 - Chris Eaves; 7 - Josh Stackley; 11 - Matt Covington; 22 - Blaine Richardson; 23 - Andy Phillips; 24 - Trent Weathers; Catchers: 4 - Will Coker; 13 - Brady Mashak

=== Coaches ===
2004 The Citadel Bulldogs baseball coaching staff
- Fred Jordan - Head coach - 13th year
- Chris Lemonis - Assistant coach - 10th year
- David Beckley - Assistant coach - 3rd year

=== Schedule ===
2004 The Citadel Bulldogs baseball game log
Regular season

February
Date	Opponent	Site/stadium	Score	Win	Loss	Save	Overall record	SoCon Record
Feb 15	Charlotte*	Joseph P. Riley Jr. Park • Charleston, SC	W 5–0	Ellis	Treadway	None	1–0	
Feb 20	Richmond*	Joseph P. Riley Jr. Park • Charleston, SC (Homewood Suites Shootout presented by Charleston Crab House)	L 1–2	Duclos	Ellis	Cronin	1–1	
Feb 21	West Virginia*	Joseph P. Riley Jr. Park • Charleston, SC (Homewood Suites Shootout presented by Charleston Crab House)	W 5–4	Brown	Asbury	None	2–1	
Feb 22	Old Dominion*	Joseph P. Riley Jr. Park • Charleston, SC (Homewood Suites Shootout presented by Charleston Crab House)	L 6–8^{15}	Arrowood	Burgess	None	2–2	
Feb 28	NC State*	Joseph P. Riley Jr. Park • Charleston, SC (Homewood Suites Tournament presented by Trademark Properties)	L 1–3	Rogers	Ellis	None	2–3	
Feb 28	College of Charleston*	Joseph P. Riley Jr. Park • Charleston, SC (Homewood Suites Tournament presented by Trademark Properties)	L 4–5	Johnson	K. Egleton	Harker	2–4	

March
Date	Opponent	Site/stadium	Score	Win	Loss	Save	Overall record	SoCon Record
Mar 2	vs Oregon State*	Les Murakami Stadium • Honolulu, HI	W 7–6	Sprouse	Buck	None	3–4	
Mar 3	vs Chicago State*	Les Murakami Stadium • Honolulu, HI	W 5–0	M. Egleton	Darby	Phillips	4–4	
Mar 4	at Hawaii*	Les Murakami Stadium • Honolulu, HI	L 3–6	Bauer	Beckham	Fisherbaugh	4–5	
Mar 5	vs Oregon State*	Les Murakami Stadium • Honolulu, HI	L 2–3	Gunderson	Sprouse	Buck	4–6	
Mar 6	vs Chicago State*	Les Murakami Stadium • Honolulu, HI	W 11–3	K. Egleton	Mad	None	5–6	
Mar 10	Coastal Carolina*	Joseph P. Riley Jr. Park • Charleston, SC	L 3–12	Costanzo	Cannon	None	5–7	
Mar 12	at Elon	Walter C. Latham Park • Elon, NC	W 5–4	Sprouse	Fratoe	None	6–7	1–0
Mar 13	at Elon	Walter C. Latham Park • Elon, NC	W 13–7	K. Egleton	Cole	None	7–7	2–0
Mar 14	at Elon	Walter C. Latham Park • Elon, NC	L 4–6	Acosta	Sprouse	None	7–8	2–1
Mar 17	at NC State	Doak Field • Raleigh, NC	W 5–2	Brown	Hobson	Sprouse	8–8	
Mar 19	Western Carolina	Joseph P. Riley Jr. Park • Charleston, SC	W 4–0	Ellis	C. McConnell	None	9–8	3–1
Mar 20	Western Carolina	Joseph P. Riley Jr. Park • Charleston, SC	W 6–3	K. Egleton	E. McConnell	Sprouse	10–8	4–1
Mar 21	Western Carolina	Joseph P. Riley Jr. Park • Charleston, SC	W 6–3	Cannon	Josey	None	11–8	5–1
Mar 23	at Charleston Southern*	Buccaneer Ballpark • North Charleston, SC	W 19–6	Beckham	Bissell	None	12–8	
Mar 24	at Winthrop*	Winthrop Ballpark • Rock Hill, SC	W 5–4	Maxwell	Reeves	Sprouse	13–8	
Mar 26	at Wofford*	Russell C. King Field • Spartanburg, SC	W 9–1	Ellis	Peterson	None	14–8	6–1
Mar 27	at Wofford	Russell C. King Field • Spartanburg, SC	W 7–4	K. Egleton	Rampey	Sprouse	15–8	7–1
Mar 28	at Wofford	Russell C. King Field • Spartanburg, SC	W 8–4^{10}	Sprouse	Vartanian	None	16–8	8–1
Mar 31	Charleston Southern*	Joseph P. Riley Jr. Park • Charleston, SC	L 7–12	Holmen	McLaurin	Swindle	16–9	

April
Date	Opponent	Site/stadium	Score	Win	Loss	Save	Overall record	SoCon Record
Apr 2	Appalachian State	Joseph P. Riley Jr. Park • Charleston, SC	W 6–2	Ellis	Peterson	None	17–9	9–1
Apr 3	Appalachian State	Joseph P. Riley Jr. Park • Charleston, SC	W 9–1	K. Egleton	Clark	None	18–9	10–1
Apr 4	Appalachian State	Joseph P. Riley Jr. Park • Charleston, SC	W 13–9	Burges	Noton	None	19–9	11–1
Apr 7	Charleston Southern*	Joseph P. Riley Jr. Park • Charleston, SC	L 7–12	Holmen	McLaurin	Swindle	19–10	
Apr 9	at College of Charleston	CofC Baseball Stadium at Patriot's Point • Mount Pleasant, SC	W 10–5	Ellis	Harker	None	20–10	12–1
Apr 10	at College of Charleston	CofC Baseball Stadium at Patriot's Point • Mount Pleasant, SC	L 4–15	Johnson	K. Egleton	Chigges	20–11	12–2
Apr 11	at College of Charleston	CofC Baseball Stadium at Patriot's Point • Mount Pleasant, SC	L 7–9	Harker	Sprouse	None	20–12	12–3
Apr 14	at Charleston Southern*	Buccaneer Ballpark • North Charleston, SC	L 2–5	Parnell	Covington	None	20–13	
Apr 16	High Point*	Joseph P. Riley Jr. Park • Charleston, SC	W 10–4	Ellis	Helman	None	21–13	
Apr 17	High Point*	Joseph P. Riley Jr. Park • Charleston, SC	W 11–10	Covington	Shorey	None	22–13	
Apr 18	High Point*	Joseph P. Riley Jr. Park • Charleston, SC	W 14–2	Cannon	Kniginyzky	None	23–13	
Apr 20	at Clemson*	Doug Kingsmore Stadium • Clemson, SC	L 4–13	Hahn	Beckham	None	23–14	
Apr 21	at South Carolina*	Sarge Frye Field • Columbia, SC	L 2–5	Donald	Maxwell	Blackwell	23–15	
Apr 23	Davidson	Joseph P. Riley Jr. Park • Charleston, SC	W 3–0	Ellis	Carter	None	24–15	13–3
Apr 24	Davidson	Joseph P. Riley Jr. Park • Charleston, SC	W 12–3	K. Egleton	Dellinger	None	25–15	14–3
Apr 25	Davidson	Joseph P. Riley Jr. Park • Charleston, SC	W 6–2	Cannon	Akin	None	26–15	15–3
Apr 30	at East Tennessee State	Cardinal Park • Johnson City, TN	L 9–10	Kite	Sprouse	None	26–16	15–4

May
Date	Opponent	Site/stadium	Score	Win	Loss	Save	Overall record	SoCon Record
May 1	at East Tennessee State	Cardinal Park • Johnson City, TN	L 7–10^{13}	Moore	Cannon	None	26–17	15–5
May 2	at East Tennessee State	Cardinal Park • Johnson City, TN	L 7–9	Hall	Maxwell	None	26–18	15–6
May 4	Savannah State*	Joseph P. Riley Jr. Park • Charleston, SC	W 5–2	Beckham	Markyna	Owens	27–18	
May 5	Savannah State*	Joseph P. Riley Jr. Park • Charleston, SC	L 5–7	Fielder	Sprouse	Thomas	27–19	
May 7	Furman	Joseph P. Riley Jr. Park • Charleston, SC	W 11–1	Ellis	Funk	None	28–19	16–6
May 8	Furman	Joseph P. Riley Jr. Park • Charleston, SC	W 5–4	Beckham	Hodinka	Owens	29–19	17–6
May 9	Furman	Joseph P. Riley Jr. Park • Charleston, SC	W 9–4	Smith	Mitchell	None	30–19	18–6
May 11	at Coastal Carolina*	Charles Watson Stadium • Conway, SC	L 5–8	Andreas	Beckham	Binda	30–20	
May 12	South Carolina*	Joseph P. Riley Jr. Park • Charleston, SC	L 1–6	Blackwell	Owens	None	30–21	
May 14	at Georgia Southern	J. I. Clements Stadium • Statesboro, GA	L 8–11	Evans	Ellis	Harrison	30–22	18–7
May 15	at Georgia Southern	J. I. Clements Stadium • Statesboro, GA	L 10–11	Harrison	Beckham	None	30–23	18–8
May 16	at Georgia Southern	J. I. Clements Stadium • Statesboro, GA	L 4–13	Lairsey	Cannon	None	30–24	18–9
May 18	Winthrop*	Joseph P. Riley Jr. Park • Charleston, SC	L 2–5	Wilson	Brown	None	30–25	
May 20	UNC Greensboro	Joseph P. Riley Jr. Park • Charleston, SC	W 7–3	Ellis	Metzger	None	31–25	19–9
May 21	UNC Greensboro	Joseph P. Riley Jr. Park • Charleston, SC	W 6–1	K. Egleton	Starnes	None	32–25	20–9
May 22	UNC Greensboro	Joseph P. Riley Jr. Park • Charleston, SC	W 4–13	Cannon	Falcon	None	33–25	21–9

Postseason

SoCon Tournament
Date	Opponent	Site/stadium	Score	Win	Loss	Save	Overall record	SoConT Record
May 26	East Tennessee State	Joseph P. Riley Jr. Park • Charleston, SC	W 6–2	Ellis	Hall	None	34–25	1–0
May 27	Davidson	Joseph P. Riley Jr. Park • Charleston, SC	W 10–1	K. Egleton	Carter	None	35–25	2–0
May 28	Western Carolina	Joseph P. Riley Jr. Park • Charleston, SC	L 2–5	Ellenburg	Beckham	McCullen	35–26	2–1
May 29	College of Charleston	Joseph P. Riley Jr. Park • Charleston, SC	W 7–2	Cannon	Piccola	None	36–26	3–1
May 29	Western Carolina	Joseph P. Riley Jr. Park • Charleston, SC	W 9–2	Ellis	McGowan	None	37–26	4–1
May 30	Western Carolina	Joseph P. Riley Jr. Park • Charleston, SC	W 8–1	Smith	Josey	None	38–26	5–1

NCAA Columbia Regional
Date	Opponent	Site/stadium	Score	Win	Loss	Save	Overall record	Reg Record
June 4	at South Carolina	Sarge Frye Field • Columbia, SC	L 4–12	Rawl	K. Egleton	None	38–27	0–1
June 5	Coastal Carolina	Sarge Frye Field • Columbia, SC	W 10–1	Ellis	Carter	None	39–27	1–1
June 5	North Carolina	Sarge Frye Field • Columbia, SC	L 3–6	Benson	Cannon	Gross	39–28	1–2

== 2005 ==
2005 The Citadel Bulldogs baseball
- Conference: Southern Conference
- Record: 25–34 (14–16 SoCon)
- Head coach: Fred Jordan (14th season)
- Home stadium: Joseph P. Riley Jr. Park

2005 Southern Conference baseball standings
	Conf.				Overall
Team	W		L	PCT	W		L	PCT
#26 College of Charleston †^{y} ‍‍‍	27	–	3	.900	48	–	15	.762
Georgia Southern ‍‍‍	18	–	11	.621	38	–	22	.633
Western Carolina ‍‍‍	18	–	12	.600	33	–	23	.589
Elon ‍‍‍	18	–	12	.600	32	–	25	.561
UNC Greensboro ‍‍‍	17	–	13	.567	31	–	22	.585
The Citadel ‍‍‍	14	–	16	.467	25	–	34	.424
East Tennessee State ‍‍‍	13	–	16	.448	31	–	22	.585
Furman ‍‍‡‍^{y}	13	–	16	.448	30	–	29	.508
Davidson ‍‍‍	13	–	17	.433	26	–	24	.520
Wofford ‍‍‍	7	–	23	.233	17	–	37	.315
Appalachian State ‍‍‍	5	–	24	.172	10	–	42	.192
† – Conference champion ‡ – SoCon Tournament champion y – Invited to the NCAA tournament As of June 30, 2005; Rankings from Collegiate Baseball

=== Roster ===
2005 The Citadel Bulldogs roster
Pitchers: 10 - Ken Egleton; 14 - Griff Beckham; 16 - Link Saunders; 17 - Ryan Owens; 18 - Michael McLaurin; 19 - Justin Smith; 22 - Creghton McCallum; 23 - Tim Martin; 25 - Evan Burgess; 27 - Shannon Sprouse; 28 - Jamie Maxwell; 29 - Stephen Williams; 33 - Scott Mendenhall; 35 - Joe Johnson	Catchers: 4 - Will Coker; 13 - Brady Mashak; Infielders: 1 - Chris Ard; 2 - Tripp Cappelmann; 3 - Mark Egleton; 8 - Chris Swauger; 12 - Matt Matulia; 21 - Jon Aughey	Outfielders: 6 - Chance Smith; 7 - Josh Stackley; 9 - Zach Brown; 11 - Matt Covington; 24 - Trent Weather; 31 - Chris Eaves; 34 - Blaine Richardson

=== Coaches ===
2005 The Citadel Bulldogs baseball coaching staff
- Fred Jordan - Head coach - 14th year
- Chris Lemonis - Assistant coach - 11th year
- David Beckley - Assistant coach - 4th year

=== Schedule ===
2005 The Citadel Bulldogs baseball game log
Regular season

February
Date	Opponent	Site/stadium	Score	Win	Loss	Save	Overall record	SoCon Record
Feb 12	at Charlotte*	Tom and Lib Phillips Field • Charlotte, NC	L 4–9	Mills	Beckham	None	0–1	
Feb 13	at Charlotte*	Tom and Lib Phillips Field • Charlotte, NC	W 4–3^{11}	Saunders	Walker	None	1–1	
Feb 18	Old Dominion*	Joseph P. Riley Jr. Park • Charleston, SC (Homewood Suites Shootout presented by Trademark Properties)	W 6–5^{11}	Wiliams	Arrowood	None	2–1	
Feb 19	Coppin State*	Joseph P. Riley Jr. Park • Charleston, SC (Homewood Suites Shootout presented by Trademark Properties)	W 15–0	Owens	Carroll	None	3–1	
Feb 20	Richmond*	Joseph P. Riley Jr. Park • Charleston, SC (Homewood Suites Shootout presented by Trademark Properties)	L 2–5^{10}	Alas	Saunders	None	3–2	
Feb 25	NC State*	Joseph P. Riley Jr. Park • Charleston, SC (Homewood Suites Shootout presented by Charleston Crab House)	L 3–10	Duncan	Beckham	None	3–3	
Feb 26	West Virginia*	Joseph P. Riley Jr. Park • Charleston, SC (Homewood Suites Shootout presented by Charleston Crab House)	W 11–1	Owens	Osbourn	None	4–3	

March
Date	Opponent	Site/stadium	Score	Win	Loss	Save	Overall record	SoCon Record
Mar 2	at Coastal Carolina*	Charles Watson Stadium • Conway, SC	W 4–2	Saunders	Blinda	None	5–3	
Mar 4	Stony Brook*	Joseph P. Riley Jr. Park • Charleston, SC	W 3–2^{11}	Saunders	Abel	None	6–3	
Mar 5	Stony Brook*	Joseph P. Riley Jr. Park • Charleston, SC	W 3–2	Beckham	Fitzgerald	Sprouse	7–3	
Mar 6	Stony Brook*	Joseph P. Riley Jr. Park • Charleston, SC	L 0–1	Restivo	Egleton	Bakey	7–4	
Mar 9	Coastal Carolina*	Joseph P. Riley Jr. Park • Charleston, SC	L 1–5	Hurry	Smith	None	7–5	
Mar 11	at UNC Greensboro	UNCG Baseball Stadium • Greensboro, NC	L 1–2	Mason	Owens	None	7–6	0–1
Mar 12	at UNC Greensboro	UNCG Baseball Stadium • Greensboro, NC	L 6–14	Currin	Beckham	McCall	7–7	0–2
Mar 13	at UNC Greensboro	UNCG Baseball Stadium • Greensboro, NC	L 3–4	Stames	Egleton	McCall	7–8	0–3
Mar 18	Elon	Joseph P. Riley Jr. Park • Charleston, SC	L 2–4^{11}	Chastain	Saunders	None	7–9	0–4
Mar 19	Elon	Joseph P. Riley Jr. Park • Charleston, SC	L 5–6	Chastain	Sprouse	None	7–10	0–5
Mar 20	Elon	Joseph P. Riley Jr. Park • Charleston, SC	W 6–3	Smith	Adams	Saunders	8–10	1–5
Mar 23	at College of Charleston*	CofC Baseball Stadium at Patriot's Point • Mount Pleasant, SC	L 0–13	Braden	Maxwell	Chigges	8–11	
Mar 25	at Western Carolina	Hennon Stadium • Cullowhee, NC	L 1–15	McConnell	Owens	None	8–12	1–6
Mar 26	at Western Carolina	Hennon Stadium • Cullowhee, NC	W 8–7	Saunders	McCullen	None	9–12	2–6
Mar 26	at Western Carolina	Hennon Stadium • Cullowhee, NC	L 9–10	Ellenburg	Sprouse	Miller	9–13	2–7
Mar 30	South Carolina*	Joseph P. Riley Jr. Park • Charleston, SC	L 2–4	Donald	Beckham	Marsh	9–14	

April
Date	Opponent	Site/stadium	Score	Win	Loss	Save	Overall record	SoCon Record
Apr 2	Wofford	Joseph P. Riley Jr. Park • Charleston, SC	L 12–14	Cole	Saunders	None	9–15	2–8
Apr 2	Wofford	Joseph P. Riley Jr. Park • Charleston, SC	W 21–5	Owens	Redwine	None	10–15	3–8
Apr 3	Wofford	Joseph P. Riley Jr. Park • Charleston, SC	W 6–3	Egleton	Hewitt	None	11–15	4–8
Apr 6	at South Carolina*	Sarge Frye Field • Columbia, SC	L 4–9	Lambert	McLaurin	None	11–16	
Apr 9	at Appalachian State	Beaver Field at Jim and Bettie Smith Stadium • Boone, NC	L 5–9	Clark	Owens	None	11–17	4–9
Apr 9	at Appalachian State	Beaver Field at Jim and Bettie Smith Stadium • Boone, NC	L 8–9	Reeder	Egleton	Fish	11–18	4–10
Apr 10	at Appalachian State	Beaver Field at Jim and Bettie Smith Stadium • Boone, NC	W 12–5	Beckham	Caudill	None	12–18	5–10
Apr 12	Longwood*	Joseph P. Riley Jr. Park • Charleston, SC	L 4–7	Horn	McCallum	Mangigian	12–19	
Apr 13	Longwood*	Joseph P. Riley Jr. Park • Charleston, SC	W 9–7	Maxwell	Moore	Saunders	13–19	
Apr 15	College of Charleston	Joseph P. Riley Jr. Park • Charleston, SC	W 6–4	Owens	Edell	Saunders	14–19	6–10
Apr 16	College of Charleston	Joseph P. Riley Jr. Park • Charleston, SC	L 3–9	Gemma	Egleton	McLaughlin	14–20	6–11
Apr 17	College of Charleston	Joseph P. Riley Jr. Park • Charleston, SC	L 10–17	Meszaros	Saunders	Harker	14–21	6–12
Apr 20	Winthrop*	Joseph P. Riley Jr. Park • Charleston, SC	L 2–6	Edwards	Maxwell	None	14–22	
Apr 22	Charleston Southern*	Joseph P. Riley Jr. Park • Charleston, SC	L 5–8	Evans	Owens	Fasulo	14–23	
Apr 23	Charleston Southern*	Joseph P. Riley Jr. Park • Charleston, SC	W 10–6	Smith	Bissell	None	15–23	
Apr 24	Charleston Southern*	Joseph P. Riley Jr. Park • Charleston, SC	L 10–17	Sowers	Beckham	None	15–24	
Apr 26	East Carolina*	Joseph P. Riley Jr. Park • Charleston, SC	L 0–3	Hose	Maxwell	Connelly	15–25	
Apr 29	at Davidson	T. Henry Wilson Jr. Field • Davidson, NC	L 7–9	Hartanov	Saunders	None	15–26	6–13
Apr 30	at Davidson	T. Henry Wilson Jr. Field • Davidson, NC	W 4–3	Saunders	Hartanov	None	16–26	7–13

May
Date	Opponent	Site/stadium	Score	Win	Loss	Save	Overall record	SoCon Record
May 1	at Davidson	T. Henry Wilson Jr. Field • Davidson, NC	L 5–11	Meade	Egleton	None	16–27	7–14
May 3	at Charleston Southern*	Buccaneer Ballpark • North Charleston, SC	L 0–11	Sowers	Beckham	None	16–28	
May 4	at Winthrop*	Winthrop Ballpark • Rock Hill, SC	L 6–13	Terry	Williams	None	16–29	
May 6	East Tennessee State	Joseph P. Riley Jr. Park • Charleston, SC	W 8–5	Owens	Calicutt	Saunders	17–29	8–14
May 7	East Tennessee State	Joseph P. Riley Jr. Park • Charleston, SC	L 5–8^{10}	Moore	Saunders	None	17–30	8–15
May 8	East Tennessee State	Joseph P. Riley Jr. Park • Charleston, SC	W 19–11	Burgess	Lovett	Williams	18–30	9–15
May 11	at NC State*	Doak Field • Raleigh, NC	L 5–8	Letchworth	Burgess	Devine	18–31	
May 13	at Furman	Latham Baseball Stadium • Greenville, SC	W 9–3	"Owens'	Perry	None	19–31	10–15
May 14	at Furman	Latham Baseball Stadium • Greenville, SC	W 7–4	Burgess	Hollstegge	None	20–31	11–15
May 15	at Furman	Latham Baseball Stadium • Greenville, SC	W 5–2	Williams	Hodinka	Burgess	21–31	12–15
May 19	Georgia Southern	Joseph P. Riley Jr. Park • Charleston, SC	L 5–8	Teaford	Owens	None	21–32	12–16
May 21	Georgia Southern	Joseph P. Riley Jr. Park • Charleston, SC	W 9–4	Smith	Evans	None	22–32	13–16
May 21	Georgia Southern	Joseph P. Riley Jr. Park • Charleston, SC	W 4–2	Beckham	Lairsey	Burgess	23–32	14–16

Postseason

SoCon Tournament
Date	Opponent	Site/stadium	Score	Win	Loss	Save	Overall record	SoConT Record
May 25	Western Carolina	Joseph P. Riley Jr. Park • Charleston, SC	L 1–6	McCullen	Owens	None	23–33	0–1
May 26	East Tennessee State	Joseph P. Riley Jr. Park • Charleston, SC	W 10–6	Smith	Moore	None	24–33	1–1
May 27	Elon	Joseph P. Riley Jr. Park • Charleston, SC	W 8–7	Saunders	Regan	None	25–33	2–1
May 27	College of Charleston	Joseph P. Riley Jr. Park • Charleston, SC	L 7–9	McLaunglin	Martin	Harker	25–34	2–2

== 2006 ==
2006 The Citadel Bulldogs baseball
- Conference: Southern Conference
- Record: 34–27 (15–12 SoCon)
- Head coach: Fred Jordan (15th season)
- Home stadium: Joseph P. Riley Jr. Park

2006 Southern Conference baseball standings
	Conf.				Overall
Team	W		L	PCT	W		L	PCT
Elon ‍†‍‍^{y}	21	–	6	.778	45	–	18	.714
#13 College of Charleston ‡^{y} ‍‍‍	20	–	7	.741	46	–	17	.730
Furman ‍‍‍	16	–	11	.593	32	–	23	.582
Georgia Southern ‍‍‍	16	–	11	.593	31	–	27	.534
The Citadel ‍‍‍	15	–	12	.556	34	–	27	.557
Western Carolina ‍‍‍	14	–	13	.519	33	–	27	.550
UNC Greensboro ‍‍‍	13	–	14	.481	26	–	33	.441
Appalachian State ‍‍‍	9	–	18	.333	24	–	31	.436
Davidson ‍‍‍	6	–	21	.222	18	–	33	.353
Wofford ‍‍‍	5	–	22	.185	20	–	37	.351
† – Conference champion ‡ – SoCon Tournament champion y – Invited to the NCAA tournament As of June 30, 2006; Rankings from Collegiate Baseball

=== Roster ===
2006 The Citadel Bulldogs roster
Pitchers: 4 - Matt Crim - Freshman; 10 - Mark Egleton - Senior; 15 - Wes Wrenn - Freshman; 16 - Link Saunders - Junior; 17 - Ryan Owens - Senior; 18 - Michael McLaurin - Senior; 19 - Justin Smith - Junior; 23 - Timmy Martin - Sophomore; 28 - Jamie Maxwell - Junior; 29 - Stephen Williams - Junior	Catchers: 13 - Brady Mashak - Senior; 14 - Sid Fallaw - Freshman; - Brian Shubsda - Freshman; Outfielders: 6 - Chance Smith - Sophomore; 8 - Chris Swauger - Sophomore; 11 - Matt Covington - Senior; 24 - Trent Weathers - Senior; 25 - Chris Eaves - Senior; 34 - Joe Hoerter - Junior; 35 - Blaine Richardson - Senior	Infielders: 1 - Trey Thomas - Freshman; 2 - Tripp Cappelmann - Senior; 3 - Ken Egleton - Senior; 5 - Matt Arnold - Sophomore; 9 - Zach Brown - Junior; 12 - Matt Matulia - Senior; 21 - Brett Bull - Freshman; 22 - Sonny Meade - Freshman; 27 - Conrad Kellahan - Sophomore; 32 - Joey Welling - Freshman; 37 - Bryan Altman - Freshman; - Johnny Dangerfield - Freshman; - Stephen Hunt - Sophomore

=== Coaches ===
2006 The Citadel Bulldogs baseball coaching staff
- Fred Jordan - Head coach - 15th year
- Chris Lemonis - Assistant coach - 12th year
- David Beckley - Assistant coach - 5th year

=== Schedule ===
2006 The Citadel Bulldogs baseball game log
Regular season

February
Date	Opponent	Site/stadium	Score	Win	Loss	Save	Overall record	SoCon Record
Feb 10	vs. Virginia*	Charles Watson Stadium • Conway, SC (Springmaid Beach Resort Tournament)	L 3–5	Ballard	Owens	Lambert	0–1	
Feb 17	Richmond*	Joseph P. Riley Jr. Park • Charleston, SC (Homewood Suites Shootout presented by Trademark Properties)	W 6–0	Wrenn	Owens	Saunders	1–1	
Feb 18	Nebraska*	Joseph P. Riley Jr. Park • Charleston, SC (Homewood Suites Shootout presented by Trademark Properties)	W 8–5	Smith	Dorn	Saunders	2–1	
Feb 19	NC State*	Joseph P. Riley Jr. Park • Charleston, SC (Homewood Suites Shootout presented by Trademark Properties)	L 2–6	Hobson	Egleton	None	2–2	
Feb 21	Hofstra*	Joseph P. Riley Jr. Park • Charleston, SC	W 8–7	Saunders	Denlea	None	3–2	
Feb 22	Hofstra*	Joseph P. Riley Jr. Park • Charleston, SC	W 4–3	Crim	Dunn	Saunders	4–2	
Feb 24	Le Moyne*	Joseph P. Riley Jr. Park • Charleston, SC (Homewood Suites Shootout presented by Charleston Crab House)	W 8–5	Smith	Lindsey	Saunders	5–2	
Feb 26	Towson*	Joseph P. Riley Jr. Park • Charleston, SC (Homewood Suites Shootout presented by Charleston Crab House)	L 7–9^{10}	Curd	Saunders	Brown	5–3	

March
Date	Opponent	Site/stadium	Score	Win	Loss	Save	Overall record	SoCon Record
Mar 1	Le Moyne*	Joseph P. Riley Jr. Park • Charleston, SC	W 4–3	Brown	Leduc	Saunders	6–3	
Mar 3	Princeton*	Joseph P. Riley Jr. Park • Charleston, SC	W 7–6	Smith	Miller	Saunders	7–3	
Mar 4	Princeton*	Joseph P. Riley Jr. Park • Charleston, SC	W 14–1	Owens	Fabian	None	8–3	
Mar 4	Princeton*	Joseph P. Riley Jr. Park • Charleston, SC	W 10–7	Crim	Walz	Saunders	9–3	
Mar 5	Princeton*	Joseph P. Riley Jr. Park • Charleston, SC	L 2–3	Peyton	Bull	Miller	9–4	
Mar 8	at NC State*	Doak Field • Raleigh, NC	L 2–3	Duncan	Brown	Walls	9–5	
Mar 10	Butler*	Joseph P. Riley Jr. Park • Charleston, SC	W 11–2	Wrenn	Deter	None	10–5	
Mar 11	Butler*	Joseph P. Riley Jr. Park • Charleston, SC	W 4–3^{11}	Saunders	Kruszka	None	11–5	
Mar 12	Butler*	Joseph P. Riley Jr. Park • Charleston, SC	L 6–10	Vollmer	Brown	None	11–6	
Mar 14	Charleston Southern*	Joseph P. Riley Jr. Park • Charleston, SC	W 8–5	Saunders	White	None	12–6	
Mar 17	at UNLV*	Earl Wilson Stadium • Paradise, NV	L 6–22	Saddoris	Wrenn	None	12–7	
Mar 18	at UNLV*	Earl Wilson Stadium • Paradise, NV	L 1–8	Skogley	Owens	None	12–8	
Mar 19	at UNLV*	Earl Wilson Stadium • Paradise, NV	L 7–8^{10}	Beard	Saunders	None	12–9	
Mar 24	at Georgia Southern	J. I. Clements Stadium • Statesboro, GA	L 4–5	Teaford	Wrenn	Cogswell	12–10	0–1
Mar 25	at Georgia Southern	J. I. Clements Stadium • Statesboro, GA	L 4–5	Battisto	Owens	Cogswell	12–11	0–2
Mar 26	at Georgia Southern	J. I. Clements Stadium • Statesboro, GA	W 10–3	Crim	Chiciak	Saunders	13–11	1–2
Mar 29	Winthrop*	Joseph P. Riley Jr. Park • Charleston, SC	L 1–7	Hildreth	Brown	None	13–12	
Mar 31	UNC Greensboro	Joseph P. Riley Jr. Park • Charleston, SC	W 7–2	Wrenn	Stames	None	14–12	2–2

April
Date	Opponent	Site/stadium	Score	Win	Loss	Save	Overall record	SoCon Record
Apr 1	UNC Greensboro	Joseph P. Riley Jr. Park • Charleston, SC	L 2–3	Falcon	Owens	Currin	14–13	2–3
Apr 2	UNC Greensboro	Joseph P. Riley Jr. Park • Charleston, SC	W 9–5	Crim	McCall	None	15–13	3–3
Apr 4	at Charleston Southern*	Buccaneer Ballpark • North Charleston, SC	W 13–12	Martin	White	Saunders	16–13	
Apr 7	Furman	Joseph P. Riley Jr. Park • Charleston, SC	L 2–3	Hodinka	Saunders	Hollstegge	16–14	3–4
Apr 8	Furman	Joseph P. Riley Jr. Park • Charleston, SC	W 4–1	Owens	Smith	Saunders	17–14	4–4
Apr 9	Furman	Joseph P. Riley Jr. Park • Charleston, SC	L 2–5	Femmster	Crim	Hollstegge	17–15	4–5
Apr 12	at Coastal Carolina*	Charles Watson Stadium • Conway, SC	W 10–6	Martin	Petty	None	18–15	
Apr 14	at Elon	Walter C. Latham Park • Elon, NC	L 4–5	Tilley	Smith	None	18–16	4–6
Apr 15	at Elon	Walter C. Latham Park • Elon, NC	L 4–7	Chastain	Owens	Tilley	18–17	4–7
Apr 16	at Elon	Walter C. Latham Park • Elon, NC	L 10–11	Tilley	Saunders	None	18–18	4–8
Apr 19	at South Carolina*	Sarge Frye Field • Columbia, SC	L 2–11	Atwood	Brown	None	18–19	
Apr 21	Western Carolina	Joseph P. Riley Jr. Park • Charleston, SC	W 5–4	Wrenn	McConnell	Saunders	19–19	5–8
Apr 23	Western Carolina	Joseph P. Riley Jr. Park • Charleston, SC	L 5–8	Sexton	Owens	Holland	19–20	5–9
Apr 23	Western Carolina	Joseph P. Riley Jr. Park • Charleston, SC	W 4–3	Saunders	Thomburg	None	20–20	6–9
Apr 25	College of Charleston*	Joseph P. Riley Jr. Park • Charleston, SC	W 4–1	Meade	Meszaros	Saunders	21–20	
Apr 28	at Wofford	Russell C. King Field • Spartanburg, SC	L 4–5	Melton	Saunders	None	21–21	6–10
Apr 29	at Wofford	Russell C. King Field • Spartanburg, SC	W 7–4	Owens	Player	Saunders	22–21	7–10
Apr 30	at Wofford	Russell C. King Field • Spartanburg, SC	W 7–6	Smith	Beaton	Saunders	23–21	8–10

May
Date	Opponent	Site/stadium	Score	Win	Loss	Save	Overall record	SoCon Record
May 3	at Winthrop*	Winthrop Ballpark • Rock Hill, SC	L 2–8	Schwartz	Egleton	None	23–22	
May 5	Appalachian State	Joseph P. Riley Jr. Park • Charleston, SC	W 7–2	Wrenn	Reeder	None	24–22	9–10
May 6	Appalachian State	Joseph P. Riley Jr. Park • Charleston, SC	L 2–7	Sherill	Saunders	None	24–23	9–11
May 7	Appalachian State	Joseph P. Riley Jr. Park • Charleston, SC	W 4–3	Smith	Teague	None	25–23	10–11
May 9	South Carolina*	Joseph P. Riley Jr. Park • Charleston, SC	L 3–12	Honeycutt	Egleton	None	25–24	
May 11	Davidson	Joseph P. Riley Jr. Park • Charleston, SC	W 13–4	Wrenn	Wilson	None	26–24	11–11
May 12	Davidson	Joseph P. Riley Jr. Park • Charleston, SC	W 8–2	Owens	Meade	Smith	27–24	12–11
May 12	Davidson	Joseph P. Riley Jr. Park • Charleston, SC	W 13–3	Crim	West	Smith	28–24	13–11
May 18	at College of Charleston	CofC Baseball Stadium at Patriot's Point • Mount Pleasant, SC	W 4–2	Smith	McLaughlin	Saunders	29–24	14–11
May 19	at College of Charleston	CofC Baseball Stadium at Patriot's Point • Mount Pleasant, SC	L 5–7	Chigges	Owens	None	29–25	14–12
May 20	at College of Charleston	CofC Baseball Stadium at Patriot's Point • Mount Pleasant, SC	W 11–10	Egleton	Meszaros	None	30–25	15–12

Postseason

SoCon Tournament
Date	Opponent	Site/stadium	Score	Win	Loss	Save	Overall record	SoConT Record
May 24	Georgia Southern	Joseph P. Riley Jr. Park • Charleston, SC	W 6–3	Wrenn	Teaford	Smith	31–25	1–0
May 25	Elon	Joseph P. Riley Jr. Park • Charleston, SC	L 3–12	Glafenheim	Saunders	None	31–26	1–1
May 26	UNC Greensboro	Joseph P. Riley Jr. Park • Charleston, SC	W 10–3	Egleton	Gibson	None	32–26	2–1
May 26	Western Carolina	Joseph P. Riley Jr. Park • Charleston, SC	W 4–2	Smith	Holland	None	33–26	3–1
May 27	Elon	Joseph P. Riley Jr. Park • Charleston, SC	W 14–11	Saunders	Porter	Owens	34–26	4–1
May 27	College of Charleston	Joseph P. Riley Jr. Park • Charleston, SC	L 4–5	Meszaros	Smith	Monsma	34–27	4–2

== 2007 ==
2007 The Citadel Bulldogs baseball
- Conference: Southern Conference
- Record: 34–27 (12–15 SoCon)
- Head coach: Fred Jordan (16th season)
- Home stadium: Joseph P. Riley Jr. Park

2007 Southern Conference baseball standings
	Conf.				Overall
Team	W		L	PCT	W		L	PCT
Western Carolina ‍†‍‍^{y}	20	–	7	.741	42	–	20	.677
College of Charleston † ‍‍‍	20	–	7	.741	39	–	19	.672
Elon ‍‍‍	15	–	12	.556	32	–	29	.525
Appalachian State ‍‍‍	14	–	13	.519	33	–	26	.559
UNC Greensboro ‍‍‍	14	–	13	.519	30	–	30	.500
Georgia Southern ‍‍‍	13	–	14	.481	34	–	28	.548
The Citadel ‍‍‍	12	–	15	.444	34	–	27	.557
Furman ‍‍‍	11	–	16	.407	19	–	36	.345
Wofford ‍‍‡‍^{y}	8	–	19	.296	30	–	33	.476
Davidson ‍‍‍	8	–	19	.296	19	–	34	.358
† – Conference champion ‡ – SoCon Tournament champion y – Invited to the NCAA tournament As of June 30, 2007; Rankings from Collegiate Baseball

=== Roster ===
2007 The Citadel Bulldogs roster
Pitchers: 4 - Matt Crim - Sophomore; 10 - Chris Boyce - Freshman; 13 - Matt Reifsnider - Freshman; 15 - Wes Wrenn - Sophomore; 16 - Link Saunders - (redshirt) Senior; 17 - Nick Sprowls - Freshman; 19 - Justin Smith - (redshirt) Senior; 21 - Brett Bull - Sophomore; 23 - Timmy Martin - Junior; 24 - Chris McGuiness - Freshman; 25 - Raymond Copenhaver - Freshman; 28 - Jamie Maxwell - Senior; 29 - Stephen Williams - Senior; 30 - Derrick Raybon - Freshman	Catchers: 14 - Sid Fallaw - Sophomore; 18 - Richard Jones - Freshman; 32 - Brian Shubsda - (redshirt) Freshman; Infielders: 2 - Conrad Kellahan - Junior; 3 - Bryan Altman - (redshirt) Sophomore; 5 - Matt Arnold - Junior; 9 - Zach Brown - Senior; 11 - Matt Simonelli - Freshman; 12 - Kyle Jordan - Freshman; 27 - Aaron Johnson - Freshman; 31 - Johnny Dangerfield - (redshirt) Freshman; 33 - Joey Welling - (redshirt) Freshman	Outfielders: 1 - Trey Thomas - Freshman; 6 - Chance Smith - (redshirt) Junior; 8 - Chris Swauger - Junior; 22 - Sonny Meade - Sophomore; 34 - Joe Hoerter - Senior

=== Coaches ===
2007 The Citadel Bulldogs baseball coaching staff
- Fred Jordan - Head coach - 16th year
- David Beckley - Assistant coach - 6th year
- Stuart Lake - Assistant coach - 1st year

=== Schedule ===
2007 The Citadel Bulldogs baseball game log
Regular season

February
Date	Opponent	Site/stadium	Score	Win	Loss	Save	Overall record	SoCon Record
Feb 9	East Tennessee State*	Joseph P. Riley Jr. Park • Charleston, SC	W 13–6	Wrenn	Langston	None	1–0	
Feb 10	East Tennessee State*	Joseph P. Riley Jr. Park • Charleston, SC	L 3–5^{13}	Glafenheim	Saunders	None	1–1	
Feb 11	East Tennessee State*	Joseph P. Riley Jr. Park • Charleston, SC	W 11–4	Smith	Lombardi	None	2–1	
Feb 16	Richmond*	Joseph P. Riley Jr. Park • Charleston, SC	W 7–6^{10}	Saunders	Zielinski	None	3–1	
Feb 17	Liberty*	Joseph P. Riley Jr. Park • Charleston, SC	L 1–2	Umberger	Crim	Page	3–2	
Feb 18	South Carolina*	Joseph P. Riley Jr. Park • Charleston, SC	W 7–6	Copenhaver	Pelzer	Saunders	4–2	
Feb 23	Virginia Tech*	Joseph P. Riley Jr. Park • Charleston, SC	L 4–5^{11}	Ballard	Maxwell	None	4–3	
Feb 24	Minnesota*	Joseph P. Riley Jr. Park • Charleston, SC	L 3–6	Brabender	Crim	Oslin	4–4	
Feb 25	UNC Asheville*	Joseph P. Riley Jr. Park • Charleston, SC	W 4–3	Saunders	Buchanan	None	5–4	
Feb 27	Campbell*	Joseph P. Riley Jr. Park • Charleston, SC	W 20–10	Smith	England	None	6–4	

March
Date	Opponent	Site/stadium	Score	Win	Loss	Save	Overall record	SoCon Record
Mar 2	vs James Madison*	Winthrop Ballpark • Rock Hill, SC	W 5–4	Wrenn	Swanson	Saunders	7–4	
Mar 3	vs Kent State*	Winthrop Ballpark • Rock Hill, SC	W 13–9	Smith	Rodgers	None	8–4	
Mar 10	Columbia*	Joseph P. Riley Jr. Park • Charleston, SC	L 1–14	Purdy	Wrenn	None	8–5	
Mar 10	Columbia*	Joseph P. Riley Jr. Park • Charleston, SC	W 2–1	Crim	Perkins	Saunders	9–5	
Mar 11	Columbia*	Joseph P. Riley Jr. Park • Charleston, SC	W 6–1	Smith	Baumann	None	10–5	
Mar 13	Savannah State*	Joseph P. Riley Jr. Park • Charleston, SC	W 8–7	McGuiness	Cortes	Saunders	11–5	
Mar 16	Eastern Illinois*	Joseph P. Riley Jr. Park • Charleston, SC	W 19–14	Wrenn	Guttosch	None	12–5	
Mar 17	Eastern Illinois*	Joseph P. Riley Jr. Park • Charleston, SC	W 5–4^{10}	Saunders	Derbak	None	13–5	
Mar 18	Eastern Illinois*	Joseph P. Riley Jr. Park • Charleston, SC	W 5–4	McGuiness	Vaculik	None	14–5	
Mar 20	Winthrop*	Joseph P. Riley Jr. Park • Charleston, SC	W 8–3	Reifsnider	Honce	None	15–5	
Mar 23	Elon	Joseph P. Riley Jr. Park • Charleston, SC	L 1–3	Hensley	Wrenn	None	15–6	0–1
Mar 24	Elon	Joseph P. Riley Jr. Park • Charleston, SC	W 8–6	Crim	Ebert	None	16–6	1–1
Mar 25	Elon	Joseph P. Riley Jr. Park • Charleston, SC	L 8–12	Romanowicz	Smith	None	16–7	1–2
Mar 27	Brown*	Joseph P. Riley Jr. Park • Charleston, SC	L 4–6	Hallberg	Saunders	None	16–8	
Mar 28	Brown*	Joseph P. Riley Jr. Park • Charleston, SC	W 6–5	Williams	Costa	Sprowls	17–8	
Mar 30	at Western Carolina	Hennon Stadium • Cullowhee, NC	L 3–7	Sexton	Wrenn	None	17–9	1–3
Mar 31	at Western Carolina	Hennon Stadium • Cullowhee, NC	L 5–12	Masters	Copenhaver	None	17–10	1–4

April
Date	Opponent	Site/stadium	Score	Win	Loss	Save	Overall record	SoCon Record
Apr 1	at Western Carolina	Hennon Stadium • Cullowhee, NC	L 3–18	Martin	Smith	None	17–11	1–5
Apr 4	at College of Charleston*	CofC Baseball Stadium at Patriot's Point • Mount Pleasant, SC	L 0–7	Goldberg	Reifsnider	None	17–12	
Apr 6	Wofford	Joseph P. Riley Jr. Park • Charleston, SC	W 11–8	Saunders	Gilmartin	None	18–12	2–5
Apr 7	Wofford	Joseph P. Riley Jr. Park • Charleston, SC	W 8–7^{10}	Saunders	Kearney	None	19–12	3–5
Apr 7	Wofford	Joseph P. Riley Jr. Park • Charleston, SC	W 17–5	Crim	Austin	None	20–12	4–5
Apr 13	at Appalachian State	Beaver Field at Jim and Bettie Smith Stadium • Boone, NC	L 7–9	Sherrill	Smith	None	20–13	4–6
Apr 13	at Appalachian State	Beaver Field at Jim and Bettie Smith Stadium • Boone, NC	W 17–0	Crim	Rook	None	21–13	5–6
Apr 14	at Appalachian State	Beaver Field at Jim and Bettie Smith Stadium • Boone, NC	W 8–5	Reifsnider	Quate	Saunders	22–13	6–6
Apr 18	at Charleston Southern*	Buccaneer Ballpark • North Charleston, SC	L 6–9	Green	Sprowls	Tweddale	22–14	
Apr 20	at Davidson	T. Henry Wilson Jr. Field • Davidson, NC	L 4–6	Wilson	Wrenn	Webb	22–15	6–7
Apr 21	at Davidson	T. Henry Wilson Jr. Field • Davidson, NC	W 25–14	Smith	Knight	Reifsnider	23–15	7–7
Apr 22	at Davidson	T. Henry Wilson Jr. Field • Davidson, NC	W 9–4	Maxwell	Middour	None	24–15	8–7
Apr 24	Coastal Carolina*	Joseph P. Riley Jr. Park • Charleston, SC	L 1–5	McCully	Reifsnider	None	24–16	
Apr 27	College of Charleston	Joseph P. Riley Jr. Park • Charleston, SC	L 2–7	Chigges	Wrenn	None	24–17	8–8
Apr 28	College of Charleston	Joseph P. Riley Jr. Park • Charleston, SC	L 9–15	Goldberg	Crim	None	24–18	8–9
Apr 29	College of Charleston	Joseph P. Riley Jr. Park • Charleston, SC	L 4–10	Bunton	McGuiness	Tomlinson	24–19	8–10

May
Date	Opponent	Site/stadium	Score	Win	Loss	Save	Overall record	SoCon Record
May 4	at UNC Greensboro	UNCG Baseball Stadium • Greensboro, NC	L 3–6	Falcon	Wrenn	None	24–20	8–11
May 6	at UNC Greensboro	UNCG Baseball Stadium • Greensboro, NC	L 7–8^{11}	Starnes	Saunders	None	24–21	8–12
May 6	at UNC Greensboro	UNCG Baseball Stadium • Greensboro, NC	W 10–3	Reifsnider	Starnes	None	25–21	9–12
May 8	East Carolina*	Joseph P. Riley Jr. Park • Charleston, SC	W 8–6	Smith	Ruhlman	Sprowls	26–21	
May 9	at South Carolina	Sarge Frye Field • Columbia, SC	L 3–12	Cisco	McGuiness	None	26–22	
May 11	Georgia Southern	Joseph P. Riley Jr. Park • Charleston, SC	W 9–1	Wrenn	Eubanks	None	27–22	10–12
May 12	Georgia Southern	Joseph P. Riley Jr. Park • Charleston, SC	W 8–3	Crim	Wilkerson	None	28–22	11–12
May 13	Georgia Southern	Joseph P. Riley Jr. Park • Charleston, SC	L 4–17	Lairsey	Reifsnider	None	28–23	11–13
May 15	Charleston Southern	Joseph P. Riley Jr. Park • Charleston, SC	W 8–2	McGuiness	Rowland	None	29–23	
May 17	at Furman	Latham Baseball Stadium • Greenville, SC	L 2–4	Klinker	Smith	None	29–24	11–14
May 18	at Furman	Latham Baseball Stadium • Greenville, SC	W 13–5	Crim	Jackson	Copenhaver	30–24	12–14
May 19	at Furman	Latham Baseball Stadium • Greenville, SC	L 3–7	Hollstegge	Reifsnider	None	30–25	12–15

Postseason

SoCon Tournament
Date	Opponent	Site/stadium	Score	Win	Loss	Save	Overall record	SoConT Record
May 22	Davidson	Joseph P. Riley Jr. Park • Charleston, SC	W 7–0	Wrenn	Wilson	None	31–25	1–0
May 23	Western Carolina	Joseph P. Riley Jr. Park • Charleston, SC	W 7–2	Crim	Sexton	Saunders	32–25	2–0
May 24	Elon	Joseph P. Riley Jr. Park • Charleston, SC	W 6–5	Smith	Lewter	Saunders	33–25	3–0
May 25	Wofford	Joseph P. Riley Jr. Park • Charleston, SC	L 2–6	Austin	Sprowls	Vartanian	33–26	3–1
May 26	Elon	Joseph P. Riley Jr. Park • Charleston, SC	W 5–2	Wrenn	Basham	Reifsnider	34–26	4–1
May 26	Wofford	Joseph P. Riley Jr. Park • Charleston, SC	L 2–4	Redwine	Reifsnider	Gilmartin	34–27	4–2

== 2008 ==
2008 The Citadel Bulldogs baseball
- Conference: Southern Conference
- Record: 28–28 (12–15 SoCon)
- Head coach: Fred Jordan (17th season)
- Home stadium: Joseph P. Riley Jr. Park

2008 Southern Conference baseball standings
	Conf.				Overall
Team	W		L	PCT	W		L	PCT
Elon ‍†‍‡‍^{y}	19	–	8	.704	44	–	18	.710
College of Charleston ‍‍‍	18	–	9	.667	39	–	20	.661
Furman ‍‍‍	17	–	10	.630	33	–	24	.579
Georgia Southern ‍‍‍	16	–	11	.593	33	–	25	.569
UNC Greensboro ‍‍‍	15	–	12	.556	33	–	27	.550
Appalachian State ‍‍‍	14	–	13	.519	32	–	27	.542
Western Carolina ‍‍‍	14	–	13	.519	29	–	28	.509
The Citadel ‍‍‍	12	–	15	.444	28	–	28	.500
Wofford ‍‍‍	6	–	21	.222	24	–	35	.407
Davidson ‍‍‍	4	–	23	.148	12	–	38	.240
† – Conference champion ‡ – SoCon Tournament champion y – Invited to the NCAA tournament As of June 30, 2008; Rankings from Collegiate Baseball

=== Roster ===
2008 The Citadel Bulldogs roster
Pitchers: 4 - Matt Crim - Junior; 9 - Asher Wojciechowski - Freshman; 10 - Chris Boyce - Sophomore; 13 - Matt Reifsnider - Sophomore; 15 - Wes Wrenn - Junior; 16 - Matt Talley - Freshman; 17 - Nick Sprowls - Sophomore; 21 - Brett Bull - Junior; 23 - Timmy Martin - Senior; 25 - Raymond Copenhaver - Sophomore; 28 - Drew Mahaffey - Freshman; 34 - Stanton Smith - (redshirt) Freshman; 45 - Chase Martin - (redshirt) Freshman	Catchers: 6 - Sid Fallaw - Junior; 18 - Richard Jones - Sophomore; 30 - Grant Richards - Freshman; 32 - Brian Shubsda - (redshirt) Sophomore; 44 - Kirk Sims - Freshman; Infielders: 2 - Conrad Kellahan - Senior; 3 - Bryan Altman - (redshirt) Sophomore; 5 - Matt Arnold - Senior; 11 - Matt Simonelli - Sophomore; 12 - Kyle Jordan - Sophomore; 24 - Chris McGuiness - Sophomore; 27 - Aaron Johnson - (redshirt) Freshman; 31 - Johnny Dangerfield - (redshirt) Sophomore; 33 - Joey Welling - (redshirt) Sophomore; 35 - Legare Jones - Freshman	Outfielders: 1 - Trey Thomas - Junior; 7 - Brad Felder - Freshman; 8 - Chris Swauger - Senior; 22 - Sonny Meade - Junior; 29 - William Ladd - Freshman

=== Coaches ===
2008 The Citadel Bulldogs baseball coaching staff
- Fred Jordan - Head coach - 17th year
- David Beckley - Assistant coach - 7th year
- Stuart Lake - Assistant coach - 2nd year

=== Schedule ===
2008 The Citadel Bulldogs baseball game log
Regular season

February
Date	Opponent	Site/stadium	Score	Win	Loss	Save	Overall record	SoCon Record
Feb 23	Delaware	Joseph P. Riley Jr. Park • Charleston, SC	L 2–7	McGuire	Crim	None	0–1	
Feb 23	Delaware	Joseph P. Riley Jr. Park • Charleston, SC	W 12–0	Wojciechowski	Crispell	None	1–1	
Feb 24	Delaware	Joseph P. Riley Jr. Park • Charleston, SC	L 4–6	Rorick	Talley	Slovak	1–2	
Feb 27	UNC Wilmington	Joseph P. Riley Jr. Park • Charleston, SC	W 3–1	Sprowls	Harrold	Reifsnider	2–2	
Feb 29	North Carolina A&T	Joseph P. Riley Jr. Park • Charleston, SC	W 2–1^{10}	Reifsnider	Frink	None	3–2	

March
Date	Opponent	Site/stadium	Score	Win	Loss	Save	Overall record	SoCon Record
Mar 1	Louisville	Joseph P. Riley Jr. Park • Charleston, SC (Charleston Firefighter Memorial Challenge)	W 1–0^{10}	Reifsnider	Kiekhefer	None	4–2	
Mar 2	NC State	Joseph P. Riley Jr. Park • Charleston, SC (Charleston Firefighter Memorial Challenge)	L 3–4	McConnell	Wrenn	Gillheeney	4–3	
Mar 4	USC Upstate	Joseph P. Riley Jr. Park • Charleston, SC	W 10–1	Martin	Oliver	None	5–3	
Mar 5	USC Upstate	Joseph P. Riley Jr. Park • Charleston, SC	W 4–3^{12}	Reifsnider	Hayes	None	6–3	
Mar 8	Evansville	Joseph P. Riley Jr. Park • Charleston, SC (The Citadel Shootout)	W 13–8	Crim	Page	None	7–3	
Mar 8	Wright State	Joseph P. Riley Jr. Park • Charleston, SC (The Citadel Shootout)	W 6–4	Wrenn	DeWeese	Reifsnider	8–3	
Mar 9	UNC Asheville	Joseph P. Riley Jr. Park • Charleston, SC (The Citadel Shootout)	W 13–7	Copenhaver	Harrington	None	9–3	
Mar 11	College of Charleston	Joseph P. Riley Jr. Park • Charleston, SC	W 13–1	Wojciechowski	Caulfield	None	10–3	
Mar 12	Indiana State	Joseph P. Riley Jr. Park • Charleston, SC	L 3–4	Inman	McGuinness	Dawson	10–4	
Mar 14	at Elon	Walter C. Latham Park • Elon, NC	L 2–7	Hensley	Wrenn	None	10–5	0–1
Mar 15	at Elon	Walter C. Latham Park • Elon, NC	W 5–4	Crim	Lewter	Reifsnider	11–5	1–1
Mar 16	at Elon	Walter C. Latham Park • Elon, NC	L 7–8	Britt	Copenhaver	Girdwood	11–6	1–2
Mar 18	Charleston Southern	Joseph P. Riley Jr. Park • Charleston, SC	W 5–3	Martin	Markham	Reifsnider	12–6	
Mar 21	Furman	Joseph P. Riley Jr. Park • Charleston, SC	L 4–11	Jackson	Crim	None	12–7	1–3
Mar 22	Furman	Joseph P. Riley Jr. Park • Charleston, SC	W 10–1	Wrenn	M. Smith	None	13–7	2–3
Mar 23	Furman	Joseph P. Riley Jr. Park • Charleston, SC	W 5–2	Wojciechowski	Feemster	Reifsnider'	14–7	3–3
Mar 25	Coastal Carolina	Joseph P. Riley Jr. Park • Charleston, SC	L 1–5	Wheeler	Talley	Haug	14–8	
Mar 26	Winthrop	Joseph P. Riley Jr. Park • Charleston, SC	L 6–11	Newman	McGuinness	None	14–9	
Mar 28	Appalachian State	Joseph P. Riley Jr. Park • Charleston, SC	W 6–5	Crim	Dowdy	Reifsnider	15–9	4–3
Mar 29	Appalachian State	Joseph P. Riley Jr. Park • Charleston, SC	L 6–14	Andress	Wrenn	Mills	15–10	4–4
Mar 30	Appalachian State	Joseph P. Riley Jr. Park • Charleston, SC	W 9–6	Wojciechowski	Rook	Reifsnider	16–10	5–4

April
Date	Opponent	Site/stadium	Score	Win	Loss	Save	Overall record	SoCon Record
Apr 1	South Carolina	Joseph P. Riley Jr. Park • Charleston, SC	L 4–7	Bangs	Copenhaver	None	16–11	
Apr 2	at Mercer	Claude Smith Field • Macon, GA	L 5–9	April	Bull	None	16–12	
Apr 5	at Wofford	Russell C. King Field • Spartanburg, SC	W 6–2	Crim	Summers	None	17–12	6–4
Apr 6	at Wofford	Russell C. King Field • Spartanburg, SC	W 18–2	Wrenn	Austin	Martin	18–12	7–4
Apr 6	at Wofford	Russell C. King Field • Spartanburg, SC	L 5–6^{10}	Gilmartin	Reifsnider	None	18–13	7–5
Apr 8	at Charleston Southern	Buccaneer Ballpark • North Charleston, SC	W 7–4	Talley	Brase	None	19–13	
Apr 11	Davidson	Joseph P. Riley Jr. Park • Charleston, SC	W 9–3	Crim	Middour	None	20–13	8–5
Apr 12	Davidson	Joseph P. Riley Jr. Park • Charleston, SC	W 9–1	Wrenn	Kennedy	None	21–13	9–5
Apr 13	Davidson	Joseph P. Riley Jr. Park • Charleston, SC	W 12–7	Bull	Siliwak	None	22–13	10–5
Apr 15	at UNC Wilmington	Brooks Field • Wilmington, NC	L 6–16	Lewis	Talley	None	22–14	
Apr 16	at East Carolina	Clark–LeClair Stadium • Greenville, NC	L 3–4^{10}	Simmons	Reifsnider	None	22–15	
Apr 18	UNC Greensboro	Joseph P. Riley Jr. Park • Charleston, SC	L 1–3	Martin	Crim	Gilliam	22–16	10–6
Apr 19	UNC Greensboro	Joseph P. Riley Jr. Park • Charleston, SC	L 3–9	McCall	Wrenn	None	22–17	10–7
Apr 20	UNC Greensboro	Joseph P. Riley Jr. Park • Charleston, SC	W 8–7	Reifsnider	White	None	23–17	11–7
Apr 25	at College of Charleston	CofC Baseball Stadium at Patriot's Point • Mount Pleasant, SC	L 2–12	Goldberg	Crim	None	23–18	11–8
Apr 26	at College of Charleston	CofC Baseball Stadium at Patriot's Point • Mount Pleasant, SC	L 1–4	Simpson	Wrenn	None	23–19	11–9
Apr 27	at College of Charleston	CofC Baseball Stadium at Patriot's Point • Mount Pleasant, SC	L 6–9	Meszaros	Reifsnider	None	23–20	11–10
Apr 30	at Coastal Carolina	Charles Watson Stadium • Conway, SC	L 1–9	Fleet	McGuinness	None	23–21	

May
Date	Opponent	Site/stadium	Score	Win	Loss	Save	Overall record	SoCon Record
May 2	at Georgia Southern	J. I. Clements Stadium • Statesboro, GA	L 13–17	Murray	Crim	None	23–22	11–11
May 3	at Georgia Southern	J. I. Clements Stadium • Statesboro, GA	W 12–8	Wrenn	Kamppi	None	24–22	12–11
May 4	at Georgia Southern	J. I. Clements Stadium • Statesboro, GA	L 5–6	Nation	Reifsnider	None	24–23	12–12
May 7	at Winthrop	Winthrop Ballpark • Rock Hill, SC	W 14–7	Bull	Yoder	None	25–23	
May 9	Western Carolina	Joseph P. Riley Jr. Park • Charleston, SC	L 3–11	Tavernier	Crim	None	25–24	12–13
May 10	Western Carolina	Joseph P. Riley Jr. Park • Charleston, SC	L 2–5^{10}	Sexton	Reifsnider	None	25–25	12–14
May 10	Western Carolina	Joseph P. Riley Jr. Park • Charleston, SC	L 2–11	Masters	Wojciechowski	None	25–26	12–15
May 13	at South Carolina	Sarge Frye Field • Columbia, SC	L 2–10	Dyson	Talley	None	25–27	
May 15	Presbyterian	Joseph P. Riley Jr. Park • Charleston, SC	W 3–2	Wojciechowski	Odom	Riefsnider	26–27	
May 16	Presbyterian	Joseph P. Riley Jr. Park • Charleston, SC	W 9–6	Crim	Cockerham	Reifsnider	27–27	
May 17	Presbyterian	Joseph P. Riley Jr. Park • Charleston, SC	W 11–1	Talley	Snipes	None	28–27	

Postseason

SoCon Tournament
Date	Opponent	Site/stadium	Score	Win	Loss	Save	Overall record	SoConT Record
May 20	Wofford	Joseph P. Riley Jr. Park • Charleston, SC	L 4–8	Summers	Copenhaver	Austin	28–28	0–1

== 2009 ==
2009 The Citadel Bulldogs baseball
- Conference: Southern Conference
- Record: 37–22 (20–10 SoCon)
- Head coach: Fred Jordan (18th season)
- Home stadium: Joseph P. Riley Jr. Park

2009 Southern Conference baseball standings
	Conf.				Overall
Team	W		L	PCT	W		L	PCT
Elon ‍†‍‍^{y}	23	–	4	.852	41	–	18	.695
Georgia Southern ‍‍‡‍^{y}	20	–	8	.714	42	–	17	.712
The Citadel ‍‍‍	20	–	10	.667	37	–	22	.627
Western Carolina ‍‍‍	19	–	10	.655	35	–	22	.614
College of Charleston ‍‍‍	17	–	13	.567	35	–	22	.614
Appalachian State ‍‍‍	15	–	13	.536	33	–	21	.611
Davidson ‍‍‍	11	–	16	.407	18	–	31	.367
Furman ‍‍‍	10	–	20	.333	24	–	31	.436
Samford ‍‍‍	9	–	21	.300	17	–	35	.327
UNC Greensboro ‍‍‍	7	–	22	.241	20	–	29	.408
Wofford ‍‍‍	7	–	22	.241	17	–	32	.347
† – Conference champion ‡ – Tournament champion y – Invited to the NCAA tournament As of June 30, 2009; Rankings from Collegiate Baseball

=== Roster ===
2009 The Citadel Bulldogs roster
Pitchers: 4 - Matt Crim - Senior; 9 - Asher Wojciechowski - Sophomore; 10 - Chris Boyce - Junior; 13 - Matt Reifsnider - Junior; 15 - Wes Wrenn - Senior; 16 - Matt Talley - Sophomore; 17 - Nick Sprowls - Junior; 19 - Jeremy Long - Freshman; 22 - Sonny Meade - Senior; 25 - Raymond Copenhaver - Junior; 28 - Drew Mahaffey - Sophomore; 30 - Zach Garrett - Freshman; 43 - Chris Evans - Freshman; 45 - Chase Martin - (redshirt) Sophomore	Catchers: 6 - Sid Fallaw - Senior; 18 - Richard Jones - Junior; 36 - Grant Richards - Sophomore; 44 - Kirk Sims - Sophomore; Infielders: 3 - Bryan Altman - (redshirt) Junior; 8 - Nick Orvin - Freshman; 11 - Matt Simonelli - (redshirt) Sophomore; 12 - Kyle Jordan - Junior; 14 - David Greene - Freshman; 24 - Chris McGuiness - Junior; 27 - Damon Ardis - Freshman; 31 - Johnny Dangerfield - Senior; 35 - Legare Jones - Sophomore	Outfielders: 1 - Trey Thomas - Senior; 2 - Justin Mackert - Freshman; 5 - Jim Johnson - Freshman; 23 - TJ Clarkson - Freshman; 29 - William Ladd - (redshirt) Freshman; 32 - Brian Shubsda - Senior; 33 - Joey Welling - Senior

=== Coaches ===
2009 The Citadel Bulldogs baseball coaching staff
- Fred Jordan - Head coach - 18th year
- David Beckley - Assistant coach - 8th year

=== Schedule ===
2009 The Citadel Bulldogs baseball game log
Regular season

February
Date	Opponent	Site/stadium	Score	Win	Loss	Save	Overall record	SoCon Record
Feb 20	Indiana State*	Joseph P. Riley Jr. Park • Charleston, SC	L 8–12	Harlan	Mahaffey	None	0–1	
Feb 21	Indiana State*	Joseph P. Riley Jr. Park • Charleston, SC	L 6–9	Shelton	Meade	None	0–2	
Feb 21	Indiana State*	Joseph P. Riley Jr. Park • Charleston, SC	L 7–8^{11}	Shelton	Reifsnider	None	0–3	
Feb 22	Indiana State*	Joseph P. Riley Jr. Park • Charleston, SC	W 5–4^{12}	Garrett	Harlan	None	1–3	
Feb 27	Radford*	Joseph P. Riley Jr. Park • Charleston, SC	W 4–2	Wrenn	Taylor	Reifsnider	2–3	
Feb 28	Tennessee Tech*	Joseph P. Riley Jr. Park • Charleston, SC	L 6–7^{15}	Henry	Mahaffey	None	2–4	

March
Date	Opponent	Site/stadium	Score	Win	Loss	Save	Overall record	SoCon Record
Mar 4	at Coastal Carolina*	Charles Watson Stadium • Conway, SC	L 1–3	Gagg	Copenhaver	McCully	2–5	
Mar 6	Elon	Joseph P. Riley Jr. Park • Charleston, SC	W 12–8^{11}	Mahaffey	Kennedy	None	3–5	1–0
Mar 7	Elon	Joseph P. Riley Jr. Park • Charleston, SC	L 5–17	Ferrer	Crim	None	3–6	1–1
Mar 8	Elon	Joseph P. Riley Jr. Park • Charleston, SC	W 8–5	Talley	Kemodle	None	4–6	2–1
Mar 9	Quinnipiac*	Joseph P. Riley Jr. Park • Charleston, SC	W 15–1	Clarkson	Duffy	None	5–6	
Mar 11	Mercer*	Joseph P. Riley Jr. Park • Charleston, SC	W 9–3	Talley	Beesley	None	6–6	
Mar 13	at Appalachian State	Beaver Field at Jim and Bettie Smith Stadium • Boone, NC	L 6–10	Andress	Wrenn	None	6–7	2–2
Mar 15	at Appalachian State	Beaver Field at Jim and Bettie Smith Stadium • Boone, NC	W 12–3	Wojciechowski	Edens	None	7–7	3–2
Mar 15	at Appalachian State	Beaver Field at Jim and Bettie Smith Stadium • Boone, NC	W 19–2	Crim	Miller	None	8–7	4–2
Mar 20	at Western Carolina	Hennon Stadium • Cullowhee, NC	W 10–3	Wrenn	Tavernier	Copenhaver	9–7	5–2
Mar 21	at Western Carolina	Hennon Stadium • Cullowhee, NC	L 1–3	Masters	Wojciechowski	None	9–8	5–3
Mar 22	at Western Carolina	Hennon Stadium • Cullowhee, NC	L 9–10	Johnson	Crim	Ottone	9–9	5–4
Mar 25	at Charleston Southern*	Buccaneer Ballpark • North Charleston, SC	W 13–3	Talley	Green	None	10–9	
Mar 26	Air Force*	Joseph P. Riley Jr. Park • Charleston, SC	W 5–2	Wrenn	Allen	Mahaffey	11–9	
Mar 27	Air Force*	Joseph P. Riley Jr. Park • Charleston, SC	W 13–1	Copenhaver	Kurcz	Mahaffey	12–9	
Mar 28	Air Force*	Joseph P. Riley Jr. Park • Charleston, SC	W 8–1	Crim	Barattino	None	13–9	
Mar 29	Air Force*	Joseph P. Riley Jr. Park • Charleston, SC	W 4–1	Copenhaver	Loyd	Mahaffey	14–9	
Mar 31	South Carolina*	Joseph P. Riley Jr. Park • Charleston, SC	W 12–5	Talley	Price	Mahaffey	15–9	

April
Date	Opponent	Site/stadium	Score	Win	Loss	Save	Overall record	SoCon Record
Apr 1	Winthrop*	Joseph P. Riley Jr. Park • Charleston, SC	L 9–12	Mizenko	Copenhaver	None	15–10	
Apr 3	Wofford	Joseph P. Riley Jr. Park • Charleston, SC	W 13–3	Wrenn	Summers	None	16–10	6–4
Apr 4	Wofford	Joseph P. Riley Jr. Park • Charleston, SC	W 6–4	Wojciehowski	White	Mahaffey	17–10	7–4
Apr 5	Wofford	Joseph P. Riley Jr. Park • Charleston, SC	L 4–5	Comle	Crim	Gilmartin	17–11	7–5
Apr 7	at College of Charleston*	CofC Baseball Stadium at Patriot's Point • Mount Pleasant, SC	L 8–21	Bouronich	Talley	None	17–12	
Apr 8	Charleston Southern*	Joseph P. Riley Jr. Park • Charleston, SC	W 9–2	Clarkson	Green	None	18–12	
Apr 11	at Davidson	T. Henry Wilson, Jr. Field • Davidson, NC	W 20–6	Wrenn	Middour	None	19–12	8–5
Apr 11	at Davidson	T. Henry Wilson, Jr. Field • Davidson, NC	L 4–5^{10}	Webb	Mahaffey	None	19–13	8–6
Apr 12	at Davidson	T. Henry Wilson, Jr. Field • Davidson, NC	W 12–5	Crim	Horkley	None	20–13	9–6
Apr 14	Savannah State*	Joseph P. Riley Jr. Park • Charleston, SC	L 2–6	Jackson	Copenhaver	None	20–14	
Apr 15	at South Carolina*	Carolina Stadium • Columbia, SC	W 5–3^{11}	Reifsnider	Bangs	Copenhaver	21–14	
Apr 17	at UNC Greensboro	UNCG Baseball Stadium • Greensboro, NC	W 10–4	Wrenn	Martin	None	22–14	10–6
Apr 18	at UNC Greensboro	UNCG Baseball Stadium • Greensboro, NC	L 3–9	Gilliam	Wojciechowski	None	22–15	10–7
Apr 19	at UNC Greensboro	UNCG Baseball Stadium • Greensboro, NC	L 4–12	Parish	Crim	None	22–16	10–8
Apr 22	at Winthrop*	Winthrop Ballpark • Rock Hill, SC	W 16–11	Talley	Yoder	None	23–16	
Apr 24	Georgia Southern	Joseph P. Riley Jr. Park • Charleston, SC	W 6–2	Wrenn	Mederos	None	24–16	11–8
Apr 25	Georgia Southern	Joseph P. Riley Jr. Park • Charleston, SC	L 1–3	Brown	Wojciechowski	Kamppi	24–17	11–9
Apr 26	Georgia Southern	Joseph P. Riley Jr. Park • Charleston, SC	W 8–4	Crim	Murray	Mahaffey	25–17	12–9

May
Date	Opponent	Site/stadium	Score	Win	Loss	Save	Overall record	SoCon Record
May 1	Samford	Joseph P. Riley Jr. Park • Charleston, SC	L 4–5	Jarry	Wrenn	None	25–18	12–10
May 2	Samford	Joseph P. Riley Jr. Park • Charleston, SC	W 5–1	Talley	Knapp	None	26–18	13–10
May 3	Samford	Joseph P. Riley Jr. Park • Charleston, SC	W 9–5	Crim	Jones	None	27–18	14–10
May 5	Presbyterian*	Joseph P. Riley Jr. Park • Charleston, SC	W 12–2	Clarkson	Moore	None	28–18	
May 6	USC Upstate*	Joseph P. Riley Jr. Park • Charleston, SC	L 3–6	McCraney	Reifsnider	Fallon	28–19	
May 7	at Furman	Latham Baseball Stadium • Greenville, SC	W 3–1	Wrenn	Parry	None	29–19	15–10
May 8	at Furman	Latham Baseball Stadium • Greenville, SC	W 7–0	Talley	Friedman	None	30–19	16–10
May 9	at Furman	Latham Baseball Stadium • Greenville, SC	W 7–6	Crim	Benton	Mahaffey	31–19	17–10
May 12	at Presbyterian	Presbyterian Baseball Complex • Clinton, SC	L 6–12	Odom	'Clarkson	None	31–20	
May 14	College of Charleston	Joseph P. Riley Jr. Park • Charleston, SC	W 14–3	Wrenn	Simpson	None	32–20	18–10
May 15	College of Charleston	Joseph P. Riley Jr. Park • Charleston, SC	W 10–4	Talley	Decker	None	33–20	19–10
May 16	College of Charleston	Joseph P. Riley Jr. Park • Charleston, SC	W 7–0	Crim	Peterson	None	34–20	20–10

Postseason

SoCon Tournament
Date	Opponent	Seed	Site/stadium	Score	Win	Loss	Save	Overall record	SoConT Record
May 20	(6) Appalachian State	3	Fluor Field at the West End • Greenville, SC	L 1–4	Quate	Wrenn	None	34–21	0–1
May 21	(7) Davidson	3	Fluor Field at the West End • Greenville, SC	W 9–8	Mahaffey	Middour	None	35–21	1–1
May 22	(6) Appalachian State	3	Fluor Field at the West End • Greenville, SC	W 5–3	Crim	Andress	None	36–21	2–1
May 23	(1) Elon	3	Fluor Field at the West End • Greenville, SC	W 5–1	Wojciechowski	Porter	None	37–21	3–1
May 23	(1) Elon	3	Fluor Field at the West End • Greenville, SC	L 7–8	Darnell	Clarkson	Girdwood	37–22	3–2

== MLB Draft picks ==
Year	Player	Round	Team
2000	Ron Colvard	43	Indians
2000	Chris Morris	15	Cardinals
2001	Philip Hartig	25	Marlins
2001	T.W. Mincey	12	Orioles
2001	Dallas McPherson	2	Angels
2002	T.A. Fulmer	13	Mariners
2004	Chip Cannon	8	Blue Jays
2004	Jonathan Ellis	6	Padres
2006	Matt Matulia	24	Cubs
2007	Zachary Brown	27	Padres
2008	Chris Swauger	26	Cardinals
2009	Wesley Wrenn	35	Mets
2009	Matt Crim	21	Braves
2009	Chris McGuiness	13	Red Sox
2009	Richard Jones	9	Cubs
