= 2000 Southern Conference baseball tournament =

- Teams: 8
- Format: Double-elimination tournament
- Finals site: Joseph P. Riley Jr. Park; Charleston, South Carolina
- Champions: Georgia Southern (2nd title)
- MVP: Matt Easterday (Georgia Southern)
- Attendance: 26,300

2000 Southern Conference baseball standings
	Conf.				Overall
Team	W		L	PCT	W		L	PCT
Georgia Southern ‍†‍‡‍^{y}	23	–	7	.767	38	–	22	.633
The Citadel ‍†‍‍	23	–	7	.767	39	–	20	.661
UNC Greensboro ‍‍‍	20	–	9	.690	34	–	24	.586
Furman ‍‍‍	15	–	13	.536	27	–	31	.466
East Tennessee State ‍‍‍	15	–	15	.500	21	–	31	.404
College of Charleston ‍‍‍	14	–	15	.483	28	–	28	.500
Davidson ‍‍‍	14	–	15	.483	26	–	28	.481
Appalachian State ‍‍‍	11	–	17	.393	17	–	38	.309
VMI ‍‍‍	11	–	19	.367	19	–	30	.388
Western Carolina ‍‍‍	8	–	22	.267	15	–	38	.283
Wofford ‍‍‍	7	–	22	.241	16	–	38	.296
† – Conference champion ‡ – SoCon Tournament champion y – Invited to the NCAA tournament As of June 30, 2000; Rankings from Collegiate Baseball

The 2000 Southern Conference baseball tournament was held at Joseph P. Riley Jr. Park in Charleston, South Carolina, from May 17 through 21. Top seeded Georgia Southern won the tournament and earned the Southern Conference's automatic bid to the 2000 NCAA Division I baseball tournament. It was the Eagles second tournament win.

The tournament used a double-elimination format. Only the top eight teams participate, so VMI, Western Carolina, and Wofford were not in the field. Western Carolina earned the top seed by winning the season series over regular season co-champion The Citadel. College of Charleston earned the seventh seed by winning the season series over Davidson.

== Seeding ==
Team	W	L	Pct	GB	Seed
Georgia Southern	23	7	.767	–	1
The Citadel	23	7	.767	–	2
UNC Greensboro	20	9	.670	2.5	3
Furman	15	13	.536	7	4
East Tennessee State	15	15	.500	8	5
College of Charleston	14	15	.483	8.5	6
Davidson	14	15	.483	8.5	7
Appalachian State	11	17	.393	11	8
VMI	11	19	.367	12	–
Western Carolina	8	22	.267	15	–
Wofford	7	22	.241	15.5	–

== Bracket ==
Upper round 1	Upper round 2	Upper final	Final
4	Furman	3
5	East Tennessee	1
4	Furman	3
1	Georgia Southern	5
1	Georgia Southern	2*
8	Appalachian State	1*
1	Georgia Southern	5*
2	The Citadel	3*
3	UNC Greensboro	3
6	College of Charleston	7
6	College of Charleston	3
2	The Citadel	6
2	The Citadel	6
7	Davidson	2	1	Georgia Southern	3	—
4	Furman	0	—
Lower round 1	Lower round 2	Lower round 3	Lower final
6	College of Charleston	9
5	East Tennessee State	3*	8	Appalachian State	2	2	The Citadel	1
8	Appalachian State	6*	6	College of Charleston	3	4	Furman	11
4	Furman	15
4	Furman	7
3	UNC Greensboro	3	3	UNC Greensboro	3
7	Davidson	2

* - Indicates game required extra innings.

== All-Tournament Team ==
Position	Player	School
P	Corey Etheridge	Furman
C	Ed Sparks	East Tennessee State
1B	Chris Behne	Appalachian State
2B	Matt Easterday	Georgia Southern
3B	Cole Hubka	Furman
SS	Danny Rueckel	Furman
OF	J. R. Revere	Georgia Southern
OF	Clint Hill	Furman
OF	Josh Edgeworth	College of Charleston
DH	Ryan Presnell	Furman

Walt Nadzak Award, Tournament Most Outstanding Player
Matt Easterday
Georgia Southern
