= 2003 Southern Conference baseball tournament =

- Teams: 8
- Format: Double-elimination tournament
- Finals site: Joseph P. Riley Jr. Park; Charleston, South Carolina
- Champions: Western Carolina (9th title)
- Winning coach: Todd Raleigh (1st title)
- MVP: Brian Sigmon (Western Carolina)
- Attendance: 20,212

2003 Southern Conference baseball standings
	Conf.				Overall
Team	W		L	PCT	W		L	PCT
Western Carolina ‍†‍‡‍^{y}	22	–	8	.733	43	–	21	.672
Georgia Southern ‍‍‍	19	–	10	.655	39	–	21	.650
The Citadel ‍‍‍	19	–	11	.633	32	–	25	.561
UNC Greensboro ‍‍‍	17	–	13	.567	39	–	21	.650
Furman ‍‍‍	17	–	13	.567	32	–	24	.571
College of Charleston ‍‍‍	17	–	13	.567	31	–	27	.534
VMI ‍‍‍	16	–	14	.533	24	–	28	.462
Davidson ‍‍‍	12	–	17	.414	18	–	27	.400
East Tennessee State ‍‍‍	9	–	20	.310	15	–	36	.294
Appalachian State ‍‍‍	8	–	22	.267	14	–	36	.280
Wofford ‍‍‍	7	–	22	.241	9	–	40	.184
† – Conference champion ‡ – SoCon Tournament champion y – Invited to the NCAA tournament As of June 30, 2003; Rankings from Collegiate Baseball

The 2003 Southern Conference baseball tournament was held at Joseph P. Riley Jr. Park in Charleston, South Carolina, from May 21 through 24. Top seeded Western Carolina won the tournament and earned the Southern Conference's automatic bid to the 2003 NCAA Division I baseball tournament. It was Western Carolina's ninth tournament win, the most in SoCon history.

The tournament used a double-elimination format. Only the top eight teams participate, so East Tennessee State, Appalachian State and Wofford were not in the field.

== Seeding ==
Team	W	L	Pct	GB	Seed
Western Carolina	22	8	.733	–	1
Georgia Southern	19	10	.655	2.5	2
The Citadel	19	11	.633	3	3
UNC Greensboro	17	13	.567	5	4
Furman	17	13	.567	5	5
College of Charleston	17	13	.567	5	6
VMI	16	14	.533	6	7
Davidson	12	17	.414	10	8
East Tennessee State	9	20	.310	13	
Appalachian State	8	22	.267	14	
Wofford	7	22	.241	15	

== Bracket ==
Upper round 1	Upper round 2	Upper final	Final
5	Furman	3
4	UNC Greensboro	2
1	Western Carolina	6
5	Furman	0
8	Davidson	0
1	Western Carolina	14
2	Georgia Southern	0
1	Western Carolina	1
7	VMI	4
2	Georgia Southern	6
2	Georgia Southern	14
6	College of Charleston	6
6	College of Charleston	8
3	The Citadel	2	1	Western Carolina	4	6
2	Georgia Southern	8	5
Lower round 1	Lower round 2	Lower round 3	Lower final
6	College of Charleston	3
4	UNC Greensboro	7	4	UNC Greensboro	4	2	Georgia Southern	4
8	Davidson	3	4	UNC Greensboro	10	4	UNC Greensboro	1
7	VMI	1
7	VMI	2
3	The Citadel	1	5	Furman	1
7	VMI	2

== All-Tournament Team ==
Position	Player	School
P	Ryan Basner	Western Carolina
C	A.J. Zickgraf	Georgia Southern
1B	Jon Wade	VMI
2B	Brandon Burnsed	Georgia Southern
3B	Chris Davis	Western Carolina
SS	Lee Curtis	College of Charleston
OF	Ryan Gordon	UNC Greensboro
OF	Brandon Long	Georgia Southern
OF	Matt Nelson	Western Carolina
DH	Brian Sigmon	Western Carolina

Walt Nadzak Award, Tournament Most Outstanding Player
Brian Sigmon
Western Carolina
