= 2007 Southern Conference baseball tournament =

- Teams: 10
- Format: Double-elimination tournament
- Finals site: Joseph P. Riley Jr. Park; Charleston, South Carolina
- Champions: Wofford (1st title)
- MVP: Brandon Waring (Wofford)
- Attendance: 31,298

2007 Southern Conference baseball standings
	Conf.				Overall
Team	W		L	PCT	W		L	PCT
Western Carolina ‍†‍‍^{y}	20	–	7	.741	42	–	20	.677
College of Charleston † ‍‍‍	20	–	7	.741	39	–	19	.672
Elon ‍‍‍	15	–	12	.556	32	–	29	.525
Appalachian State ‍‍‍	14	–	13	.519	33	–	26	.559
UNC Greensboro ‍‍‍	14	–	13	.519	30	–	30	.500
Georgia Southern ‍‍‍	13	–	14	.481	34	–	28	.548
The Citadel ‍‍‍	12	–	15	.444	34	–	27	.557
Furman ‍‍‍	11	–	16	.407	19	–	36	.345
Wofford ‍‍‡‍^{y}	8	–	19	.296	30	–	33	.476
Davidson ‍‍‍	8	–	19	.296	19	–	34	.358
† – Conference champion ‡ – SoCon Tournament champion y – Invited to the NCAA tournament As of June 30, 2007; Rankings from Collegiate Baseball

The 2007 Southern Conference baseball tournament was held at Joseph P. Riley Jr. Park in Charleston, South Carolina, from May 20 through 24. Ninth seeded Wofford won the tournament and earned the Southern Conference's automatic bid to the 2007 NCAA Division I baseball tournament. It was the Terrier's first SoCon tournament win.

All ten baseball programs in the conference participated in the tournament, with the seventh through tenth place teams playing a single-elimination opening day prior to an 8-team, double-elimination tournament.

== Seeding ==
Team	W	L	Pct	GB	Seed
College of Charleston	20	7	.704	–	1
Western Carolina	20	7	.667	–	2
Elon	15	12	.630	5	3
Appalachian State	14	13	.593	6	4
UNC Greensboro	14	13	.556	6	5
Georgia Southern	13	14	.519	7	6
The Citadel	12	15	.519	8	7
Furman	11	16	.444	9	8
Wofford	8	19	.222	12	9
Davidson	8	19	.148	12	10

== Results ==
Pairings
Results

=== Play-In Round ===
Tuesday, May 20
Team	R
#9 Wofford	5
#8 Furman	3
Notes: Furman eliminated

Tuesday, May 20
Team	R
#10 Davidson	0
#7 The Citadel	7
Notes: Davidson eliminated

=== Bracket ===
Upper round 1	Upper round 2	Upper final	Final
5	UNC Greensboro	9
4	Appalachian State
3	Elon	5
7	The Citadel	6
9	Wofford	19
1	College of Charleston	6
7	The Citadel	2
9	Wofford	6
7	The Citadel	7
2	Western Carolina	2
5	UNC Greensboro	5
9	Wofford	12
6	Georgia Southern	7
3	Elon	14	9	Wofford	4
7	The Citadel	2
Lower round 1	Lower round 2	Lower round 3	Lower final
3	Elon	9
1	College of Charleston	10	4	Appalachian State	5	7	The Citadel	5
4	Appalachian State	11	3	Elon	11	3	Elon	2
5	UNC Greensboro	9
5	UNC Greensboro	8
6	Georgia Southern	6	6	Georgia Southern	6
2	Western Carolina	5

== All-Tournament Team ==
Position	Player	School
P	Ben Austin	Wofford
C	Richard Jones	The Citadel
1B	Zach Brown	The Citadel
2B	Eric Strukie	Wofford
SS	Mike Gilmartin	Wofford
3B	Brandon Waring	Wofford
OF	Pat Irvine	Elon
OF	Sean Snell	UNC Greensboro
OF	Chris Swauger	The Citadel
DH	Andrew Franco	Appalachian State

Walt Nadzak Award, Tournament Most Outstanding Player
Brandon Waring
Wofford
