= List of VMI Keydets baseball seasons =

This is a list of VMI Keydets baseball seasons. The VMI Keydets baseball team represents the Virginia Military Institute in the Big South Conference of the NCAA's Division I. The Keydets have played their home games at Gray–Minor Stadium since 2007. Though the team has been around since 1866, statistics and records date only as far back as 1950.

VMI has yet to win a conference tournament championship in any conference, and has yet to earn a berth in the NCAA Division I Baseball Championship.

== Season results ==
National champions	College World Series berth	NCAA Tournament berth	Conference Tournament Champions	Conference/Division Regular Season Champions

Season	Head coach	Conference	Season results									Tournament results		Final poll (Note: Collegiate Baseball began team rankings in 1959. The Coaches' Poll (published by USA Today's Sports Weekly and ESPN) began publishing its rankings during the 1992 season.)	
Season	Head coach	Conference	Overall				Conference					Conference	Postseason (Note: Postseason play involving the NCAA Division I Baseball Championship began in 1947.)	CB	Coaches
Season	Head coach	Conference	Win	Loss	Tie	%	Win	Loss	Tie	%	Finish (Note: The Southern Conference used a divisional format from 1969–70 and from 1984–1988. The Big South also did this in 2013 and 2014.)	Conference	Postseason	CB	Coaches
VMI Keydets
1950	Frank Summers	SoCon	4	14	0	.222	2	7	0	.222	—	—	—	—	—
1951	Frank Summers	SoCon	1	20	0	.048	0	12	0	.000	—	—	—	—	—
1952	Vince Ragunas	SoCon	1	13	0	.071	1	8	0	.111	—	—	—	—	—
1953	Chuck Noe	SoCon	7	7	0	.500	4	4	0	.500	—	—	—	—	—
1954	Chuck Noe	SoCon	12	6	0	.667	6	4	0	.600	3rd	—	—	—	—
1955	Chuck Noe	SoCon	12	8	0	.600	6	7	0	.462	7th	—	—	—	—
1956	Jack Null	SoCon	12	10	0	.545	7	7	0	.500	5th	—	—	—	—
1957	Jack Null	SoCon	8	13	0	.381	4	6	0	.400	8th	—	—	—	—
1958	Jack Null	SoCon	4	12	0	.250	2	8	0	.200	9th	—	—	—	—
1959	Weenie Miller	SoCon	5	11	0	.313	5	10	0	.333	7th	—	—	—	—
1960	Weenie Miller	SoCon	6	8	0	.429	5	8	0	.385	7th	—	—	—	—
1961	Weenie Miller	SoCon	7	7	0	.500	6	6	0	.500	5th	—	—	—	—
1962	Charlie McGinnis	SoCon	8	7	0	.533	7	7	0	.500	5th	—	—	—	—
1963	Charlie McGinnis	SoCon	14	11	0	.560	7	7	0	.500	4th	—	—	—	—
1964	Charlie McGinnis	SoCon	11	12	1	.479	5	9	0	.357	7th	—	—	—	—
1965	Charlie McGinnis	SoCon	15	9	0	.625	8	6	0	.571	4th	—	—	—	—
1966	Fred Kelly	SoCon	10	13	0	.435	6	10	0	.375	6th	—	—	—	—
1967	Fred Kelly	SoCon	9	11	0	.450	7	9	0	.438	5th	—	—	—	—
1968	Chuck Roys	SoCon	7	8	0	.467	3	5	0	.375	8th	—	—	—	—
1969	Chuck Roys	SoCon	10	12	0	.455	8	7	0	.533	1st (North)	—	—	—	—
1970	Tom Sawyer	SoCon	6	13	0	.316	4	9	0	.308	4th (North)	—	—	—	—
1971	Tom Sawyer	SoCon	5	24	0	.172	1	15	0	.063	7th	—	—	—	—
1972	Phil Tucker	SoCon	6	19	0	.240	3	13	0	.188	7th	—	—	—	—
1973	Phil Tucker	SoCon	3	14	0	.176	0	11	0	.000	8th	—	—	—	—
1974	Donny White	SoCon	6	14	0	.300	5	9	0	.357	7th	—	—	—	—
1975	Jerry Roane	SoCon	2	18	0	.100	1	13	0	.071	8th	—	—	—	—
1976	Jerry Roane	SoCon	6	23	0	.207	2	12	0	.143	8th	—	—	—	—
1977	Vern Beitzel	SoCon	5	19	0	.208	2	12	0	.143	9th	—	—	—	—
1978	Vern Beitzel	SoCon	2	27	0	.069	0	14	0	.000	8th	—	—	—	—
1979	Vern Beitzel	SoCon	6	25	0	.194	0	15	0	.000	9th	—	—	—	—
1980	Vern Beitzel	SoCon	4	22	0	.154	0	12	0	.000	9th	—	—	—	—
1981	Jim Rowsey	SoCon	3	37	0	.075	0	16	0	.000	9th	—	—	—	—
1982	Donny White	SoCon	11	29	0	.275	6	10	0	.375	6th	—	—	—	—
1983	Donny White	SoCon	11	25	0	.306	5	9	0	.357	6th	—	—	—	—
1984	Donny White	SoCon	16	18	0	.471	6	7	0	.462	2nd (North)	First Round	—	—	—
1985	Donny White	SoCon	16	24	0	.400	8	10	0	.444	3rd (North)	—	—	—	—
1986	Donny White	SoCon	15	25	0	.375	7	11	0	.389	3rd (North)	—	—	—	—
1987	Donny White	SoCon	16	16	1	.500	8	4	0	.667	2nd (North)	2nd	—	—	—
1988	Paul Maini	SoCon	20	20	0	.500	11	7	0	.611	1st (North)	First Round	—	—	—
1989	Paul Maini	SoCon	16	23	0	.410	8	7	0	.533	4th	—	—	—	—
1990	Paul Maini	SoCon	12	26	0	.316	6	8	0	.429	4th	8th	—	—	—
1991	Paul Maini	SoCon	2	35	1	.066	1	15	0	.063	7th	6th	—	—	—
1992	Chris Finwood	SoCon	11	39	0	.220	4	15	0	.211	8th	6th	—	—	—
1993	Chris Finwood	SoCon	20	29	0	.408	5	15	0	.250	8th	2nd	—	—	—
1994	Chris Finwood	SoCon	21	29	0	.420	10	13	0	.435	7th	3rd	—	—	—
1995	Scott Gines	SoCon	19	28	0	.404	10	14	0	.417	7th	6th	—	—	—
1996	Scott Gines	SoCon	17	29	0	.370	7	16	0	.304	7th	3rd	—	—	—
1997	Scott Gines	SoCon	13	35	0	.271	6	13	0	.316	8th	8th	—	—	—
1998	Scott Gines	SoCon	14	35	0	.286	7	17	0	.292	9th	—	—	—	—
1999	Scott Gines	SoCon	22	27	0	.449	13	16	0	.448	7th	8th	—	—	—
2000	Scott Gines	SoCon	19	30	0	.388	11	19	0	.367	9th	—	—	—	—
2001	Tom Slater	SoCon	15	32	0	.319	8	19	0	.296	11th	—	—	—	—
2002	Tom Slater	SoCon	10	41	0	.196	1	27	0	.036	11th	—	—	—	—
2003	Tom Slater	SoCon	25	27	0	.481	16	14	0	.533	7th	4th	—	—	—
2004	Marlin Ikenberry	Big South	23	32	0	.418	4	20	0	.167	8th	—	—	—	—
2005	Marlin Ikenberry	Big South	27	28	0	.491	11	13	0	.458	5th	6th	—	—	—
2006	Marlin Ikenberry	Big South	30	25	0	.545	9	15	0	.375	7th	—	—	—	—
2007	Marlin Ikenberry	Big South	34	21	0	.618	10	11	0	.476	4th	8th	—	—	—
2008	Marlin Ikenberry	Big South	29	26	0	.527	14	7	0	.667	3rd	8th	—	—	—
2009	Marlin Ikenberry	Big South	18	35	0	.340	10	15	0	.400	8th	6th	—	—	—
2010	Marlin Ikenberry	Big South	33	22	0	.600	13	14	0	.481	6th	6th	—	—	—
2011	Marlin Ikenberry	Big South	27	24	1	.529	14	13	0	.519	6th	8th	—	—	—
2012	Marlin Ikenberry	Big South	16	36	0	.308	7	17	0	.292	11th	—	—	—	—
2013	Marlin Ikenberry	Big South	20	35	0	.364	6	18	0	.250	6th (North)	—	—	—	—
2014	Marlin Ikenberry	Big South	25	23	0	.417	11	16	0	.407	5th (North)	—	—	—	—
2015	Jonathan Hadra	SoCon	21	30	0	.412	12	12	0	.500	4th	5th	—	—	—
2016	Jonathan Hadra	SoCon	21	35	0	.375	4	20	0	.167	9th	9th	—	—	—
2017	Jonathan Hadra	SoCon	24	34	0	.414	7	17	0	.292	9th	5th	—	—	—
2018	Jonathan Hadra	SoCon	26	27	0	.491	12	12	0	.500	4th	8th	—	—	—
2019	Jonathan Hadra	SoCon	17	41	0	.293	9	15	0	.375	7th	First Round	—	—	—
2020	Jonathan Hadra	SoCon	0	0	0	–	0	0	0	–					

== Statistics ==
Statistics correct as of the end of the 2018 season.

	Overall			Conference			Tournament		
	Wins	Losses	Win%	Wins	Losses	Win%	Wins	Losses	Win%
Frank Summers	5	34	.128	2	19	.095			
Vince Ragunas	1	13	.071	1	8	.111			
Chuck Noe	31	21	.596	16	15	.516			
Jack Null	24	35	.407	13	21	.382			
Weenie Miller	18	26	.409	17	25	.405			
Charlie McGinnis	48	39	.552	26	28	.481			
Fred Kelly	19	24	.442	13	19	.406			
Chuck Roys	17	20	.459	11	12	.478			
Tom Sawyer	11	37	.229	5	24	.172			
Phil Tucker	9	33	.214	3	24	.111			
Donny White	91	151	.376	45	60	.429	2	4	.333
Paul Maini	50	104	.325	26	37	.413	0	6	.000
Chris Finwood	52	97	.349	19	43	.306	6	6	.500
Scott Gines	104	184	.361	54	94	.365	3	8	.273
Tom Slater	50	100	.333	25	60	.294	2	2	.500
Marlin Ikenberry	282	307	.479	109	159	.407	2	11	.154
Jonathan Hadra	92	126	.422	35	61	.365	3	7	.300
All-time record	904	1,352	.401	420	709	.372	18	44	.290
