= 2018 VCU Rams baseball team =

American college baseball season

2018 VCU Rams baseball
- Conference: Atlantic 10 Conference
- Record: 34–21 (14–10 A-10)
- Head coach: Shawn Stiffler (6th season)
- Assistant coaches: Mike McRae (1st season); Rich Witten (1st season); Josh Tutwiler (3rd season)
- Home stadium: The Diamond

2018 Atlantic 10 Conference baseball standings
	Conf.						Overall
Team	W		L		T	PCT	W		L		T	PCT
Saint Louis ‍‍‍	19	–	4	–	0	.826	35	–	18	–	0	.660
Fordham ‍‍‍	16	–	8	–	0	.667	34	–	17	–	1	.663
George Mason ‍‍‍	16	–	8	–	0	.667	26	–	25	–	0	.510
Richmond ‍‍‍	15	–	9	–	0	.625	31	–	22	–	0	.585
Davidson ‍‍‍	14	–	10	–	0	.583	32	–	19	–	0	.627
VCU ‍‍‍	14	–	10	–	0	.583	34	–	21	–	0	.618
George Washington ‍‍‍	13	–	11	–	0	.542	29	–	24	–	0	.547
Rhode Island ‍‍‍	13	–	11	–	0	.542	24	–	27	–	0	.471
Dayton ‍‍‍	10	–	14	–	0	.417	21	–	31	–	0	.404
Saint Joseph's ‍‍‍	7	–	15	–	0	.318	21	–	27	–	0	.438
St. Bonaventure ‍‍‍	6	–	15	–	0	.286	10	–	33	–	0	.233
UMass ‍‍‍	6	–	18	–	0	.250	15	–	29	–	0	.341
La Salle ‍‍‍	4	–	20	–	0	.167	14	–	41	–	0	.255
‡ – Tournament champion Rankings from Collegiate Baseball

The 2018 VCU Rams baseball team was the program's 48th baseball season. It was their 6th season the Atlantic 10 Conference.

== Roster ==
2018 VCU Rams Roster
Pitchers: 9 – Hayden Moore – Sophomore; 10 – Connor Gillispie – Sophomore; 18 – Tanner Winters – RS Sophomore; 20 – Sean Thompson – Senior; 21 – Teddy Blumenauer – Freshman; 22 – Braxton Wilks – Graduate; 23 – David Dunn – Freshman; 24 – Eric Neiman – Junior; 25 – Benjamin Dum – Junior; 30 – Michael Dailey – Junior; 31 – Dawson Simms – Freshman; 33 – Sam Ryan – Sophomore; 34 – Ryan Fox – Senior; 38 – Garrett Pearson – RS Sophomore; 40 – Jack Alkire – Junior; 41 – Ben Nelson – Senior	Infielders: 1 – Steven Carpenter – Sophomore; 2 – Paul Witt – Sopohmore; 4 – Daane Berezo – RS Senior; 13 – Zach Ching – RS Junior; 16 – Liam Hibbits – Freshman; 26 – Mitchel Lacey – Senior; 27 – Tanner Sullivan – Freshman; Utility: 8 – Hogan Brown – Freshman; 12 – Tyler Juhl – Freshman	Catchers: 15 – Hunter Vay – Freshman; 17 – Josh Simon – Sophomore; 36 – Matt Stallings – Sophomore; 37 – Andrew Schatz – Junior; Outfielders: 14 – Haiden Lamb – Senior

== Game log ==
Legend
	VCU win
	VCU loss
	Postponement/cancellation
(10)	Extra innings
*	Non-conference game

2018 VCU Rams baseball game log
Regular season

February (3–6)
Date	Opponent	Rank	Site/stadium	Score	Win	Loss	Save	Attendance	Overall record	A10 Record
Feb 16	at Liberty*		Liberty Baseball Stadium • Lynchburg, VA	**L** 4–5	Z. Clinton (1–0)	**R. Fox (0–1)**	G. Price (1)	1,606	0–1	0–0
Feb 18^{[a]}	at Liberty*		Liberty Baseball Stadium • Lynchburg, VA	**L** 10–14	L. Barker (1–0)	**M. McCarty (0–1)**	G. Price (2)	2,043	0–2	0–0
Feb 18	at Liberty*		Liberty Baseball Stadium • Lynchburg, VA	**L** 2–4	N. Skirrow (1–0)	**J. Alkire (0–1)**	B. Good (1)	2,043	0–3	0–0
Feb 20	at William & Mary*		Plumeri Park • Williamsburg, VA	**W** 4–3	**C. Gillispie (1–0)**	C. Farrell (0–1)	M. McCarty (1)	241	1–3	0–0
Feb 23	vs. West Virginia*; Coastal Carolina Tournament		Springs Brooks Stadium • Conway, SC	**W** 6–2 (11)	**B. Wilks (1–0)**	C. Dotson (0–1)	M. McCarty (2)	172	2–3	0–0
Feb 24	vs. West Virginia*; Coastal Carolina Tournament		Springs Brooks Stadium • Conway, SC	**W** 8–5	**S. Thompson (1–0)**	A. Manoah (0–1)	**M. McCarty (3)**	210	3–3	0–0
Feb 25	vs. Illinois*; Coastal Carolina Tournament		Springs Brooks Stadium • Conway, SC	**L** 4–7	R. Thompson (1–0)	**C. Gillespie (1–1)**	none	127	3–4	0–0
Feb 26	at Coastal Carolina*; Coastal Carolina Tournament		Springs Brooks Stadium • Conway, SC	**L** 5–15	S. Kobos (1–0)	**R. Fox (0–2)**	none	1,066	3–5	0–0
Feb 28	Maryland*		The Diamond • Richmond, VA	**L** 0–2	M. DiLuia (1–0)	**H. Moore (0–1)**	J. Murphy (1)	325	3–6	0–0

March (15–3)
Date	Opponent	Rank	Site/stadium	Score	Win	Loss	Save	Attendance	Overall record	A10 Record
Mar 2	Manhattan*		The Diamond • Richmond, VA	**L** 6–8	T. Stuart (1–0)	**M. Dailey (0–2)**	none	265	3–7	0–0
Mar 3	Manhattan*		The Diamond • Richmond, VA	**W** 2–1	**S. Thompson (2–0)**	J. DiNizio (0–1)	**M. McCarty (4)**	382	4–7	0–0
Mar 4	Manhattan*		The Diamond • Richmond, VA	**L** 4–6	J. Jacques (1–1)	**H. Moore (0–2)**	T. J. Stuart (1)	354	4–8	0–0
Mar 6	at North Carolina*		Boshamer Stadium • Chapel Hill, NC	Cancelled						
Mar 7	Norfolk State*		The Diamond • Richmond, VA	**W** 6–4	**M. Dailey (1–2)**	J. Henderson (0–1)	**M. McCarty (5)**	300	5–8	0–0
Mar 9	Binghamton*		The Diamond • Richmond, VA	**W** 3–1	**C. Gillispie (2–1)**	J. Wloczewski (0–3)	**M. McCarty (6)**	292	6–8	0–0
Mar 11^{[b]}	Binghamton*		The Diamond • Richmond, VA	**W** 2–1	**S. Thompson (3–0)**	N. Wegmann (1–3)	**B. Dum (1)**	399	7–8	0–0
Mar 11	Binghamton*		The Diamond • Richmond, VA	**W** 18–3	**B. Wilks (2–0)**	N. Gallagher (0–3)	none	399	8–8	0–0
Mar 13	at No. 17 East Carolina*		Clark–LeClair Stadium • Greenville, NC	**W** 3–0	**M. Dailey (2–2)**	J. Agnos (1–2)	**B. Dum (2)**	1,918	9–8	0–0
Mar 14	Lafayette*		The Diamond • Richmond, VA	**W** 8–6	**H. Moore (1–2)**	C. Jones (0–1)	**M. McCarty (7)**	246	10–8	0–0
Mar 16	Iona*		The Diamond • Richmond, VA	**W** 3–0	**S. Ryan (1–0)**	S. Bates (0–4)	**M. McCarty (8)**	293	11–8	0–0
Mar 17	Iona*		The Diamond • Richmond, VA	**W** 2–1	**B. Dum (1–0)**	V. Martin (0–1)	none	346	12–8	0–0
Mar 18	Iona*		The Diamond • Richmond, VA	**W** 5–4	**C. Gillispie (3–1)**	D. McBryan (0–2)	**M. McCarty (9)**	355	13–8	0–0
Mar 21	at VMI*		Gray–Minor Stadium • Lexington, VA	Cancelled						
Mar 23	Rhode Island		The Diamond • Richmond, VA	**W** 5–2	**C. Gillispie (4–1)**	M. Murphy (1–2)	**M. McCarty (10)**	370	14–8	1–0
Mar 24	Rhode Island		The Diamond • Richmond, VA	**W** 1–0 (15)	**C. Bafus (1–0)**	N. Robinson (0–2)	none	341	15–8	2–0
Mar 25	Rhode Island		The Diamond • Richmond, VA	**W** 4–2	**D. Dunn (1–0)**	V. Jangols (2–3)	**M. McCarty (11)**	348	16–8	3–0
Mar 28	Virginia*		The Diamond • Richmond, VA	**W** 11–3	**H. Moore (2–2)**	G. McGarry (0–2)	**C. Bafus (1)**	3,621	17–8	0–0
Mar 30	at Saint Louis		Billiken Sports Center • St. Louis, MO	**W** 4–2	**B. Wilks (3–0)**	M. Hogan (2–4)	**M. McCarty (12)**	367	18–8	4–0
Mar 31	at Saint Louis		Billiken Sports Center • St. Louis, MO	**L** 1–7	J. Wark (5–1)	**S. Thompson (3–1)**	none	123	18–9	4–1

April (10–7)
Date	Opponent	Rank	Site/stadium	Score	Win	Loss	Save	Attendance	Overall record	A10 Record
Apr 1	at Saint Louis		Billiken Sports Center • St. Louis, MO	**L** 0–9	D. Reveno (5–1)	**M. Dailey (2–3)**	none	123	18–10	4–2
Apr 3	Towson*		Schuerholz Park • Towson, MD	**W** 7–2 (6)	**S. Ryan (2–0)**	B. Plagge (1–2)	none	101	19–10	4–2
Apr 6	Dayton		The Diamond • Richmond, VA	**W** 9–4					20–10	5–2
Apr 7	Dayton		The Diamond • Richmond, VA	**W** 10–1					21–10	6–2
Apr 8	Dayton		The Diamond • Richmond, VA	**L** 1–6					21–11	6–3
Apr 11	VMI*		The Diamond • Richmond, VA	**L** 1–4					21–12	6–3
Apr 13	at St. Bonaventure		Fred Handler Park • St. Bonaventure, NY	**W** 11–4					22–12	7–3
Apr 14	at St. Bonaventure		Fred Handler Park • St. Bonaventure, NY	**W** 8–2					23–12	8–3
Apr 15	at St. Bonaventure		Fred Handler Park • St. Bonaventure, NY	**L** 2–3					23–13	8–4
Apr 17	at Maryland*		Shipley Field • College Park, MD	**W** 14–3					24–13	8–4
Apr 20	George Mason; Rivalry		The Diamond • Richmond, VA	**L** 3–11					24–14	8–5
Apr 21	George Mason; Rivalry		The Diamond • Richmond, VA	**W** 6–4					25–14	9–5
Apr 22	George Mason; Rivalry		The Diamond • Richmond, VA	**W** 1–0 (12)					26–14	10–5
Apr 25	Longwood*		The Diamond • Richmond, VA	**W** 12–2					27–14	10–5
Apr 27	at Davidson		T. Henry Wilson Jr. Field • Davidson, NC	**L** 9–10					27–15	10–6
Apr 28	at Davidson		T. Henry Wilson Jr. Field • Davidson, NC	**W** 14–1					28–15	11–6
Apr 29	at Davidson		T. Henry Wilson Jr. Field • Davidson, NC	**L** 9–13					28–16	11–7

May (1–4)
Date	Opponent	Rank	Site/stadium	Score	Win	Loss	Save	Attendance	Overall record	A10 Record
May 1	at Virginia*		Davenport Field • Charlottesville, VA	**L** 0–2					28–17	11–7
May 4	Richmond; Capital City Classic		The Diamond • Richmond, VA	**L** 2–4 (13)					28–18	11–8
May 5	Richmond; Capital City Classic		The Diamond • Richmond, VA	**W** 3–1					29–18	12–8
May 6	Richmond; Capital City Classic		The Diamond • Richmond, VA	**L** 0–3					29–19	12–9
May 8	at Old Dominion*; Rivalry		Bud Metheny Baseball Complex • Norfolk, VA							
May 11	at George Washington		Barcroft Park • Arlington, VA							
May 12	at George Washington		Barcroft Park • Arlington, VA							
May 13	at George Washington		Barcroft Park • Arlington, VA							
May 15	Old Dominion*; Rivalry		The Diamond • Richmond, VA							
May 18	vs. Western Carolina; Forest City Series		McNair Field • Forest City, NC							
May 19	vs. Western Carolina; Forest City Series		McNair Field • Forest City, NC							

Post-season

Atlantic 10 Tournament
Date	Opponent	Rank	Site/stadium	Score	Win	Loss	Save	Attendance	Overall record	A10T Record
May 23	vs. TBD; TBD		Barcroft Park • Arlington, VA							
May 24	vs. TBD; TBD		Barcroft Park • Arlington, VA							
May 25	vs. TBD; TBD		Barcroft Park • Arlington, VA							
May 26	vs. TBD; TBD		Barcroft Park • Arlington, VA							

NCAA tournament
Date	Opponent	Rank	Site/stadium	Score	Win	Loss	Save	Attendance	Overall record	NCAAT record
June 1	vs. TBD; TBD		TBD • TBD							

College World Series
Date	Opponent	Rank	Site/stadium	Score	Win	Loss	Save	Attendance	Overall record	CWS record
June 16	vs. TBD; TBD		TD Ameritrade Park • Omaha, NE							

Legend: = Win = Loss = Postponement
Bold = VCU team member
Rankings from Collegiate Baseball; parenthesis indicate tournament seedings.

== Notes ==
^{^[a]}The Feb. 17 game between Liberty and VCU was postponed due to inclement weather. The game was rescheduled to Feb. 18 at 1:00 p.m., while the originally planned Feb. 18 game was rescheduled to 4 p.m.
