= 2015 VMI Keydets baseball team =

American college baseball season

2015 VMI Keydets baseball
- Conference: Southern Conference
- Record: 21–30 (12–12 SoCon)
- Head coach: Jonathan Hadra (1st season)
- Assistant coaches: Travis Beazley; Mike Small; Michael Donovan
- Home stadium: Gray–Minor Stadium

2015 Southern Conference baseball standings
	Conf.				Overall
Team	W		L	PCT	W		L	PCT
Mercer ‍‍‍	16	–	7	.696	31	–	21	.596
Samford ‍‍‍	14	–	10	.583	29	–	24	.547
Wofford ‍‍‍	13	–	10	.565	36	–	20	.643
VMI ‍‍‍	12	–	12	.500	20	–	28	.417
UNC Greensboro ‍‍‍	12	–	12	.500	23	–	25	.479
Furman ‍‍‍	11	–	13	.458	24	–	31	.436
Western Carolina ‍‍‍	11	–	13	.458	21	–	28	.429
The Citadel ‍‍‍	10	–	14	.417	25	–	28	.472
East Tennessee State ‍‍‍	8	–	16	.333	21	–	34	.382
‡ – Tournament champion As of May 16, 2015; Rankings from Collegiate Baseball

The 2015 VMI Keydets baseball team represented the Virginia Military Institute during the 2015 NCAA Division I baseball season. The Keydets returned to the Southern Conference after an eleven-year hiatus in the Big South from 2003 to 2014. VMI was led by first-year head coach Jonathan Hadra, who replaced longtime Keydet skipper Marlin Ikenberry. Ikenberry resigned following the 2014 season for a career in private business, and was the Keydets' all-time winningest baseball coach.

== Personnel ==
VMI lost two of its starting pitchers following the 2014 season. Senior left-hander Connor Bach graduated, and was drafted by the Washington Nationals in the 21st round of the 2014 MLB draft. Additionally, junior pitcher Reed Garrett was drafted by the Texas Rangers in the 16th round, and chose to leave school early to pursue a career in baseball. Garrett played with the Spokane Indians, the Class A-Short season affiliate of the Rangers. The Keydets also graduated left fielder and backup catcher Eric Mayers, as well as relievers Berkley Hawkins, Campbell Henkel, and Travis Thomas.

=== Returning starters ===
Player	Class	Position
Andrew Woods	Senior	SP
Matt Winn	R-Senior	C
Jordan Tarsovich	R-Senior	2B
David Geary	Junior	3B
Brandon Angus	Senior	CF
Will Connerley	R-Senior	RF

=== Roster ===
2015 VMI Keydets baseball team
Players
Coaches

#	Pos.	Name	B/T	Height	Weight	Year	Home town
1	INF	Drew Bryan	R/R	5 ft 9 in (1.75 m)	165 lb (75 kg)	Sr	Philipsburg, PA
3	OF	Will Malbon	L/L	5 ft 11 in (1.8 m)	175 lb (79 kg)	So	Virginia Beach, VA
4	OF	Gary LeClair	R/R	5 ft 11 in (1.8 m)	190 lb (86 kg)	RS Jr	Richmond, VA
5	P	Jack Gomersall	R/R	6 ft 0 in (1.83 m)	185 lb (84 kg)	RS Fr	Falls Church, VA
6	INF	Jacob Jaye	L/R	6 ft 0 in (1.83 m)	185 lb (84 kg)	Fr	Winchester, VA
7	INF	Ray Lopez	R/R	6 ft 0 in (1.83 m)	190 lb (86 kg)	Jr	Lancaster, PA
8	C	Matt Winn	R/R	6 ft 0 in (1.83 m)	220 lb (100 kg)	RS Sr	Richmond, VA
10	INF	David Geary	L/R	6 ft 2 in (1.88 m)	215 lb (98 kg)	Jr	Richmond, VA
11	P	Jonathan Kelley	L/L	6 ft 2 in (1.88 m)	200 lb (91 kg)	Sr	Wilmington, NC
12	OF	Matt Dunlevy	L/R	6 ft 0 in (1.83 m)	180 lb (82 kg)	Fr	Midlothian, VA
13	P	Austin Heenan	L/L	5 ft 8 in (1.73 m)	195 lb (88 kg)	So	Melfa, VA
14	INF	Reid Bryant	L/R	5 ft 10 in (1.78 m)	175 lb (79 kg)	Fr	Madison Heights, VA
16	OF	Josh Worthley	L/R	5 ft 10 in (1.78 m)	195 lb (88 kg)	So	Virginia Beach, VA
17	P	Eric Byrd	R/R	6 ft 4 in (1.93 m)	190 lb (86 kg)	Fr	Fredericksburg, VA
18	INF	Collin Fleischer	R/R	6 ft 3 in (1.91 m)	205 lb (93 kg)	Fr	Chester, VA
19	P	Matthew Eagle	R/R	6 ft 3 in (1.91 m)	185 lb (84 kg)	Fr	Norfolk, VA
20	P	Blaine Lafin	L/R	6 ft 1 in (1.85 m)	185 lb (84 kg)	So	Culpeper, VA
21	P	TJ Lighton	R/R	6 ft 2 in (1.88 m)	205 lb (93 kg)	RS Jr	Chesapeake, VA
23	C	Brian Dudeck Jr.	L/R	6 ft 2 in (1.88 m)	205 lb (93 kg)	So	Princeton, NJ
24	P	Jared Silva	R/R	6 ft 4 in (1.93 m)	193 lb (88 kg)	Fr	Charles Town, WV
25	P	Taylor Edens	R/R	6 ft 1 in (1.85 m)	200 lb (91 kg)	Jr	Suffolk, VA
26	C	Peyton Maddox	R/R	6 ft 3 in (1.91 m)	185 lb (84 kg)	Fr	Amherst, VA
29	OF	Will Connerley	R/R	6 ft 1 in (1.85 m)	205 lb (93 kg)	RS Sr	Mechanicsville, VA
30	P	Ryan Bennett	R/R	6 ft 2 in (1.88 m)	180 lb (82 kg)	RS So	Chesapeake, VA
31	INF	Tyler Tharp	L/L	6 ft 3 in (1.91 m)	195 lb (88 kg)	So	Virginia Beach, VA
32	P	Micah Gorman	R/R	6 ft 2 in (1.88 m)	200 lb (91 kg)	Jr	Richmond, VA
33	INF	Jordan Tarsovich	R/R	5 ft 10 in (1.78 m)	180 lb (82 kg)	RS Sr	Richmond, VA
35	P	Brandon Barbery	L/L	6 ft 0 in (1.83 m)	175 lb (79 kg)	Fr	Manassas, VA
36	P	Andrew Woods	R/R	6 ft 0 in (1.83 m)	210 lb (95 kg)	Sr	Richmond, VA
38	P	Kyle Staats	L/L	6 ft 2 in (1.88 m)	250 lb (113 kg)	Fr	Manassas, VA
39	OF	Brandon Angus	R/R	6 ft 0 in (1.83 m)	190 lb (86 kg)	Sr	Mechanicsville, VA
	P	Colby Rudis	R/R	5 ft 11 in (1.8 m)	180 lb (82 kg)	Fr	Chesapeake, VA

Head coach

Jonathan Hadra (1st year)

Assistant coach(es)

Mike Small (1st year)
Michael Donovan (Senior)

Pitching coach(es)

Travis Beazley (4th year)

Legend

- (C) Team captain
- (S) Suspended
- (I) Ineligible
- Injured
- Current redshirt

Roster
Last update: February 17, 2015

== Schedule ==
Legend
	VMI win
	VMI loss
	Postponement
**Bold**	VMI team member

2015 VMI Keydets baseball game log
Regular season
February (2–1)

Date	Opponent	Site/stadium	Score	Win	Loss	Save	Attendance	Overall record	SoCon record
February 13	at North Florida	Harmon Stadium	3–1	**A. Woods** (1–0)	T. Moore (0–1)	**T. Edens** (1)	402	1–0	–
February 14	at North Florida	Harmon Stadium	11–16	A. Smith (1–0)	**T. Edens** (0–1)		416	1–1	–
February 15	at North Florida	Harmon Stadium	2–1	**B. Barbery** (1–0)	E. Incinelli (0–1)	**M. Gorman** (1)	343	2–1	–
February 17	at William & Mary	Plumeri Park	Cancelled						
February 20	Buffalo	Gray–Minor Stadium	Cancelled						
February 21	UMES	Gray–Minor Stadium	Cancelled						
February 21	Buffalo	Gray–Minor Stadium	Cancelled						
February 22	UMES	Gray–Minor Stadium	Cancelled						
February 27	Marist	Gray–Minor Stadium	Cancelled						
February 28	Marist	Gray–Minor Stadium	Cancelled						

March (4–14)

Date	Opponent	Site/stadium	Score	Win	Loss	Save	Attendance	Overall record	SoCon record
March 1	Marist	Gray–Minor Stadium	Cancelled						
March 3	at Virginia	Davenport Field	Postponed to Apr. 1						
March 6	Binghamton	Gray–Minor Stadium	15–4	**A. Woods** (2–0)	Ostner (0–3)		339	3–1	–
March 7	Binghamton	Gray–Minor Stadium	3–7	Hardy (1–1)	**B. Lafin** (0–1)		155	3–2	–
March 8	Binghamton	Gray–Minor Stadium	6–13	Grillini (1–0)	**B. Barbery** (1–1)		104	3–3	–
March 11	at James Madison	Eagle Field	7–3	**J. Silva** (1–0)	T. Jones (0–1)		234	4–3	–
March 13	Central Connecticut State	Gray–Minor Stadium	1–3	M. Blandino (1–0)	**A. Woods** (2–1)		103	4–4	–
March 15	Central Connecticut State	Gray–Minor Stadium	5–6	A. Salnitis (1–0)	**T. Edens** (0–2)	K. Connolly (1)	203	4–5	–
March 15	Central Connecticut State	Gray–Minor Stadium	2–4 (7)	C. Brown (1–0)	**A. Heenan** (0–1)		221	4–6	–
March 17	at Old Dominion	Bud Metheny Baseball Complex	5–8	M. Reinerth (1–0)	**R. Bennett** (0–1)	S. Sinnen (3)	922	4–7	–
March 18	at Old Dominion	Bud Metheny Baseball Complex	6–7	Z. Rutherford (1–0)	**M. Gorman** (0–1)		505	4–8	–
March 20	at Wofford	Russell C. King Field	2–5	M. Milburn (5–0)	**J. Silva** (1–1)	W. Stillman (7)	182	4–9	0–1
March 21	at Wofford	Russell C. King Field	7–8	J. Condra-Bogan (1–1)	**M. Eagle** (0–1)	W. Stillman (8)	267	4–10	0–2
March 22	at Wofford	Russell C. King Field	2–1	**B. Barbery** (2–1)	Scott (3–1)	**T. Edens** (2)	226	5–10	1–2
March 24	at VCU	The Diamond	0–18	Thompson (2–2)	**M. Eagle** (0–2)		606	5–11	–
March 25	Old Dominion	Gray–Minor Stadium	3–11	N. Matheson (1–0)	**J. Kelley** (0–1)		95	5–12	–
March 27	Samford	Gray–Minor Stadium	2–15	A. Ledford (3–2)	**A. Heenan** (0–2)		103	5–13	1–3
March 28	Samford	Gray–Minor Stadium	6–2	**B. Barbery** (3–1)	J. Brasher (0–2)	**T. Edens** (3)	137	6–13	2–3
March 29	Samford	Gray–Minor Stadium	5–10	P. Curry (3–3)	**M. Eagle** (0–3)	A. Gracia (5)	207	6–14	2–4
March 31	at Virginia Tech	English Field	5–6	C. Monaco (2–0)	**K. Staats** (0–1)	S. Kennedy (2)	844	6–15	–

April (9–8)

Date	Opponent	Site/stadium	Score	Win	Loss	Save	Attendance	Overall record	SoCon record
April 1	at Virginia	Davenport Field	7–6	**K. Staats** (1–1)	R. Cummins (0–1)	**T. Edens** (4)	3,014	7–15	–
April 3	at Furman	Latham Baseball Stadium	2–7	M. Solter (1–2)	**A. Heenan** (1–3)		314	7–16	2–5
April 4	at Furman	Latham Baseball Stadium	13–10	**A. Woods** (3–1)	G. Schuermann (2–1)	**T. Edens** (5)	N/A	8–16	3–5
April 4	at Furman	Latham Baseball Stadium	12–11	**J. Silva** (2–1)	W. Gaddis (2–3)	**T. Edens** (6)	376	9–16	4–5
April 7	Radford	Gray–Minor Stadium	2–6	A. Ross (2–0)	**M. Eagle** (0–4)		201	9–17	–
April 10	East Tennessee State	Gray–Minor Stadium	4–8	L. Haeberle (3–5)	**A. Heenan** (0–4)		201	9–18	4–6
April 11	East Tennessee State	Gray–Minor Stadium	6–9	J. Nesselt (4–3)	**B. Barbery** (3–2)	D. Cate (4)	245	9–19	4–7
April 12	East Tennessee State	Gray–Minor Stadium	5–4	**J. Gomersall** (1–0)	G. Krieg (1–4)	**T. Edens** (7)	167	10–19	5–7
April 14	VCU	Gray–Minor Stadium	Cancelled						
April 15	Richmond	Gray–Minor Stadium	5–10	P. Bayer (1–3)	J. Gomersall (1–1)		79	10–20	–
April 17	at Gardner–Webb	John Henry Moss Stadium	1–3	Heiligenstad (4–3)	**A. Heenan** (0–5)	Haymes (3)	150	10–21	–
April 18	at Gardner–Webb	John Henry Moss Stadium	4–3	**A. Woods** (4–1)	Hallman (4–2)	**T. Edens** (8)	250	11–21	–
April 18	at Gardner–Webb	John Henry Moss Stadium	7–3	**B. Barbery** (4–2)	Warner (2–4)	**T. Edens** (9)	155	12–21	–
April 21	William & Mary	Gray–Minor Stadium	2–8	M. Aker (1–1)	**M. Eagle** (0–5)		107	12–22	–
April 24	at The Citadel	Riley Park	8–7	**J. Gomersall** (2–1)	Z. Lavery (0–3)	**T. Edens** (10)	447	13–22	6–7
April 26	at The Citadel	Riley Park	10–6	**A. Woods** (5–1)	J. Sears (4–4)		N/A	14–22	7–7
April 26	at The Citadel	Riley Park	3–2	**B. Barbery** (5–2)	T. Byelick (1–3)	**T. Edens** (11)	475	15–22	8–7
April 28	at Radford	Radford Baseball Stadium	3–6	K. Palmer (1–0)	J. Kelley (0–2)	R. Meisinger (12)	673	15–23	–

May (5–5)

Date	Opponent	Site/stadium	Score	Win	Loss	Save	Attendance	Overall record	SoCon record
May 1	Mercer	Gray–Minor Stadium	2–7	E. Nyquist (6–2)	**A. Heenan** (0–6)		130	15–24	8–8
May 2	Mercer	Gray–Minor Stadium	6–7	C. Varga (1–0)	**J. Worthley** (0–1)	M. Pittman (3)	204	15–25	8–9
May 3	Mercer	Gray–Minor Stadium	11–16	B. Lumsden (2–1)	**T. Edens** (0–3)		162	15–26	8–10
May 8	UNC Greensboro	Gray–Minor Stadium	11–3	**A. Heenan** (1–6)	R. Clark (6–6)		188	16–26	9–10
May 9	UNC Greensboro	Gray–Minor Stadium	8–2	**A. Woods** (6–1)	A. Wantz (5–3)		223	17–26	10–10
May 10	UNC Greensboro	Gray–Minor Stadium	11–13	C. Woody (1–0)	**B. Lafin** (0–2)		265	17–27	10–11
May 12	James Madison	Gray–Minor Stadium	10–6	**M. Gorman** (1–1)	T. Jones (0–2)		222	18–27	–
May 14	at Western Carolina	Hennon Stadium	18–4	**A. Woods** (7–1)	B. Sammons (4–5)		322	19–27	11–11
May 15	at Western Carolina	Hennon Stadium	11–6	**J. Worthley** (1–1)	T. Powell (2–3)		449	20–27	12–11
May 15	at Western Carolina	Hennon Stadium	6–11	B. Nail (3–3)	**J. Kelley** (0–3)		449	20–28	12–12

Postseason
SoCon Tournament

Date	Opponent	Site/stadium	Score	Win	Loss	Save	Attendance	Overall record	Tournament record
May 21	#5 UNC Greensboro	Riley Park • Charleston, SC	6–5	**J. Gomersall** (3–1)	T. Frazier (3–1)	**T. Edens** (12)	N/A	21–28	1–0
May 22	#1 Mercer	Riley Park • Charleston, SC	7–19	M. Wade (6–1)	**B. Barbery** (5–3)		N/A	21–29	1–1
May 22	#8 The Citadel	Riley Park • Charleston, SC	5–10	Mason (3–2)	**A. Heenan** (1–7)	Hunter (13)	1,066	21–30	1–2
