= Jonathan Hadra =

American baseball coach

Biographical details
- Born: 1982 (age 42–43); Richmond, Virginia, U.S.

Playing career
- 2001–2004: VMI
- Position: First baseman

Coaching career (HC unless noted)
- 2005: VMI (asst.)
- 2006–2008: Western Kentucky (asst.)
- 2009: Bradley (asst.)
- 2010–2014: VMI (asst.)
- 2015–2022: VMI

Head coaching record
- Overall: 146–247
- Tournaments: SoCon: 3–9; NCAA: 0–0

Jonathan Elman Hadra (born 1982) is an American baseball coach and former first baseman. Hadra played college baseball at VMI from 2001 to 2004. He served as head coach of the VMI Keydets (2015–2022).

== Playing career ==
Hadra attended Atlee High School in Mechanicsville, Virginia. Hadra then committed to the Virginia Military Institute, where he was a member of the Keydets baseball team.

== Coaching career ==
After graduation, Hadra spent a year as an assistant at VMI. In 2006, Hadra began working as an assistant at Western Kentucky. After three years at Western Kentucky, he moved on to be an assistant for the Bradley Braves baseball program. After just a single season at Bradley, Hadra returned to VMI as an assistant coach.

In November 2014, VMI head coach Marlin Ikenberry resigned as the head coach, leaving Hadra as the acting head coach. On November 13, 2014, Hadra was named the full-time head coach at VMI. On July 28, 2022, Hadra resigned as the head coach of the Keydets. He had a 146–247 record over 8 seasons as head coach.

== Head coaching record ==
Statistics overview
Season	Team	Overall	Conference	Standing	Postseason
VMI Keydets (Southern Conference) (2015–2022)
2015	VMI	20–28	12–12	T-4th	Southern Tournament
2016	VMI	21–35	4–20	9th	Southern Tournament
2017	VMI	24–34	7–17	9th	Southern Tournament
2018	VMI	26–27	12–12	4th	Southern Tournament
2019	VMI	17–41	9–15	7th	Southern Tournament
2020	VMI	4–13	0–0		Season canceled due to COVID-19
2021	VMI	18–29	13–17	3rd (Blue)	
2022	VMI	16–40	6–15	7th	
VMI:		146–247	63–108		
Total:		146–247			
National champion Postseason invitational champion Conference regular season champion Conference regular season and conference tournament champion Division regular season champion Division regular season and conference tournament champion Conference tournament champion
