= 2014 VMI Keydets baseball team =

American college baseball season

2014 VMI Keydets baseball
- Conference: Big South Conference
- Record: 25–23 (11–16 Big South)
- Head coach: Marlin Ikenberry (11th season)
- Assistant coaches: Jonathan Hadra; Travis Beazley; Mike Roberts
- Home stadium: Gray–Minor Stadium

2014 Big South Conference baseball standings
	Conf.						Overall
Team	W		L		T	PCT	W		L		T	PCT
North
Liberty ^{x}‍‍‍^{y}	23	–	3	–	0	.885	41	–	18	–	0	.695
Campbell ‍‍‡‍^{y}	18	–	8	–	0	.692	41	–	21	–	0	.661
High Point ‍‍‍	18	–	8	–	0	.692	33	–	22	–	0	.600
Radford ‍‍‍	17	–	10	–	0	.630	33	–	23	–	0	.589
VMI ‍‍‍	11	–	16	–	0	.407	25	–	23	–	0	.521
Longwood ‍‍‍	9	–	18	–	0	.333	22	–	33	–	0	.400
South
Winthrop ^{x}‍‍‍	14	–	13	–	0	.519	27	–	33	–	0	.450
Coastal Carolina ‍‍‍	13	–	13	–	0	.500	24	–	33	–	0	.421
Charleston Southern ‍‍‍	12	–	14	–	0	.462	30	–	26	–	0	.536
Gardner–Webb ‍‍‍	11	–	15	–	0	.423	24	–	31	–	0	.436
Presbyterian ‍‍‍	9	–	18	–	0	.333	19	–	34	–	1	.361
UNC Asheville ‍‍‍	4	–	22	–	0	.154	13	–	40	–	0	.245
x – Division champion ‡ – Tournament champion y – Invited to the NCAA tournament As of June 1, 2014; Rankings from Collegiate Baseball

The 2014 VMI Keydets baseball team represented the Virginia Military Institute during the 2014 NCAA Division I baseball season. The Keydets played their final season as a member of the Big South Conference, as they returned to the Southern Conference in 2014–15. VMI was led by 11th-year head coach Marlin Ikenberry, and they played their home games out of Gray–Minor Stadium.

On February 21, 2014, VMI junior starting pitcher Reed Garrett threw a no-hitter against Lafayette in a 3–0 win. Garrett struck out 13 batters, including 5 of the final 6, in what was the first regular season no-hitter in Gray–Minor Stadium history, and only the second overall.

VMI ended the year with a 25–23 overall mark, and 11–16 in conference play, missing out on the Big South tournament for the third straight year.

== Personnel ==
=== Returning starters ===
Player	Class	Position
Connor Bach	Senior	SP
Reed Garrett	Junior	SP
Andrew Woods	Junior	SP
Matt Winn	R-Junior	C
Cameron Walter	R-Junior	1B
Jordan Tarsovich	R-Junior	2B
David Geary	Sophomore	3B
Brandon Angus	Junior	CF
Eric Mayers	Senior	LF
Will Connerley	R-Junior	RF

=== Roster ===
2014 VMI Keydets Roster
Pitchers: 24 Connor Bach - Senior; 30 Ryan Bennett - (redshirt) Freshman; 25 Taylor Edens - Sophomore; 35 Rian Ellis - (redshirt) Junior; 12 Reed Garrett - Junior; 5 Jack Gomersall - Freshman; 32 Micah Gorman - Freshman; 26 Berkley Hawkins - Senior; 13 Austin Heenan - Freshman; 28 Campbell Henkel - Senior; 11 Jonathan Kelley - Junior; 20 Blaine Lafin - Freshman; 21 T. J. Lighton - (redshirt) Sophomore; 18 Miles McQuaig - (redshirt) Senior; 38 Jason Stafford - Sophomore; 17 Travis Thomas - (redshirt) Senior; 36 Andrew Woods - Junior	Infielders: 1 Drew Bryan - Junior; 29 Will Connerley - (redshirt) Junior; 14 Tanner Dofflemyer - Freshman; 23 Brian Dudeck, Jr. - Freshman; 10 David Geary - Sophomore; 7 Ray Lopez - Sophomore; 9 Thomas Stallings - Junior; 33 Jordan Tarsovich - (redshirt) Junior; 31 Tyler Tharpe - Freshman; 37 Cameron Walter - (redshirt) Junior; Catchers: 27 Red Dowdell - Sophomore; 22 Eric Mayers - Senior; 8 Matt Winn - (redshirt) Junior	Outfielders: 39 Brandon Angus - Junior; 4 Gary LeClair - (redshirt) Sophomore; 3 Will Malbon - Freshman; 34 Sheldon Shifflett - Junior; 16 Josh Worthley - Freshman

- 2014 VMI Keydets Baseball Roster

=== Coaching staff ===
2014 VMI Keydets baseball coaching staff
- #19 Marlin Ikenberry – Head Coach (11th year)
- #2 Jonathan Hadra – Associate head coach/recruiting coordinator (5th year)
- #43 Travis Beazley – Assistant Coach/Pitching Coach (3rd year)
- #6 Mike Roberts – Volunteer Coach (2nd year)
- #40 Michael Donovan – Student Assistant Coach (Junior)

== Schedule ==
Legend
	VMI win
	VMI loss
	Postponement
**Bold**	VMI team member

2014 VMI Keydets baseball game log
Regular season
February (6–2)

Date	Opponent	Site/stadium	Score	Win	Loss	Save	Attendance	Overall record	BSC record
February 14	@ UNC Wilmington	Brooks Field	3–5	R. Holden (1-0)	**R. Ellis** (0-1)	W. Prince (1)	2,114	0–1	–
February 15	vs. #1 Virginia	Brooks Field	0–12	N. Kirby (1–0)	**C. Bach** (0–1)		-	0–2	–
February 16	vs. Kentucky	Brooks Field	10–9	**T. Thomas** (1–0)	Z. Strecker (0–1)		-	1–2	–
February 19	@ Richmond	Malcolm U. Pitt Field	Postponed (rain) Rescheduled for April 15						
February 21	Lafayette	Gray–Minor Stadium	3–0	**R. Garrett** (1–0)	C. Ortolf (0–1)		219	2–2	–
February 22	Lafayette	Gray–Minor Stadium	10–3	**C. Bach** (1–1)	A. Farina (0–1)		298	3–2	–
February 23	Lafayette	Gray–Minor Stadium	3–1	**A. Woods** (1–0)	T. Schwartz (0–1)	**T. Thomas** (1)	187	4–2	–
February 25	@ #1 Virginia	Davenport Field	3–2	**C. Henkel** (1–0)	W. Mayberry (0–1)	**T. Edens** (1)	2,689	5–2	–
February 28	Buffalo	Gray–Minor Stadium	2–0	**R. Garrett** (2–0)	M. McGee (1–1)	**T. Thomas** (2)	119	6–2	–

March (9–8)

Date	Opponent	Site/stadium	Score	Win	Loss	Save	Attendance	Overall record	BSC record
March 1	Maryland Eastern Shore	Gray–Minor Stadium	17–0	**A. Woods** (2–0)	J. Stinnett (0–2)		191	7–2	–
March 1	Buffalo	Gray–Minor Stadium	5–6	A. Magovney (2–0)	**C. Bach** (1–2)		122	7–3	–
March 5	@ Wake Forest	Wake Forest Baseball Park	3–9	C. Johnstone (1–0)	**C. Henkel** (1–1)		127	7–4	–
March 8	Binghamton	Gray–Minor Stadium	2–10	J. Rogalla (2–1)	**R. Garrett** (2–1)		166	7–5	–
March 8	Binghamton	Gray–Minor Stadium	4–2	**B. Hawkins** (1–0)	J. Cryts (1–2)	**T. Thomas** (3)	154	8–5	–
March 9	Binghamton	Gray–Minor Stadium	4–1	**A. Woods** (3–0)	M. Kaufman (1–1)	**C. Henkel** (1)	188	9–5	–
March 11	@ Old Dominion	Bud Metheny; Baseball Complex	4–5	G. Tomchick (1–0)	**C. Henkel** (1–2)	B. Gero (6)	752	9–6	–
March 12	@ Old Dominion	Bud Metheny; Baseball Complex	5–15	T. Bishop (1–0)	**R. Bennett** (0–1)		350	9–7	–
March 14	Radford	Gray–Minor Stadium	1–6	M. Boyle (1–2)	**R. Garrett** (2–2)		133	9–8	0–1
March 15	Radford	Gray–Minor Stadium	1–5	R. Meisinger (2–0)	**C. Bach** (1–3)		190	9–9	0–2
March 15	Radford	Gray–Minor Stadium	9–8	**T. Thomas** (2–0)	N. Andrews (1–3)		177	10–9	1–2
March 21	Presbyterian	Gray–Minor Stadium	15–2	**R. Garrett** (3–2)	B. Dees (4–2)		199	11–9	2–2
March 22	Presbyterian	Gray–Minor Stadium	6–5	**C. Bach** (2–3)	C. Knox (4–2)	**T. Edens** (2)	213	12–9	3–2
March 23	Presbyterian	Gray–Minor Stadium	5–4	**A. Woods** (4–0)	A. Lesiak (0–2)	**J. Kelley** (1)	102	13–9	4–2
March 25	@ William & Mary	Plumeri Park	Cancelled						
March 28	@ Gardner–Webb	John Henry Moss Stadium	9–3	**R. Garrett** (4–2)	M. Fraudin (1–3)		120	14–9	5–2
March 29	@ Gardner–Webb	John Henry Moss Stadium	2–5	A. Barnett (4–1)	**C. Bach** (2–4)	B. Haymes (1)	75	14–10	5–3
March 30	@ Gardner–Webb	John Henry Moss Stadium	6–2	**A. Woods** (5–0)	E. Heiligenstadt (1–4)	**B. Hawkins** (1)	120	15–10	6–3

April (7–9)

Date	Opponent	Site/stadium	Score	Win	Loss	Save	Attendance	Overall record	BSC record
April 2	@ VCU	The Diamond	8–6 (12)	**B. Lafin** (1–0)	M. Lees (4–2)		960	16–10	–
April 4	@ Liberty	Liberty Baseball Stadium	0–5	T. Lambert (7–1)	**R. Garrett** (4–3)		2,792	16–11	6–4
April 5	@ Liberty	Liberty Baseball Stadium	0–4	C. Herndon (5–1)	**C. Bach** (2–5)		1,459	16–12	6–5
April 6	@ Liberty	Liberty Baseball Stadium	0–17	P. Bean (5–1)	**A. Woods** (5–1)		901	16–13	6–6
April 8	William & Mary	Gray–Minor Stadium	5–1	**R. Bennett** (1–1)	A. Fernandez (2–2)		149	17–13	–
April 9	Richmond	Gray–Minor Stadium	4–2	**T. Edens** (1–0)	R. Harron (2–1)	**R. Ellis** (1)	111	18–13	–
April 11	@ High Point	Williard Baseball Stadium	1–2	C. Lourey (4–0)	**R. Garrett** (4–4)	J. Maloney (7)	487	18–14	6–7
April 12	@ High Point	Williard Baseball Stadium	4–3	**T. Edens** (2–0)	M. Krumm (3–5)	**B. Hawkins** (2)	522	19–14	7–7
April 13	@ High Point	Williard Baseball Stadium	4–2 (16)	**M. McQuaig** (1–0)	J. Maloney (2–3)		512	20–14	8–7
April 15	@ Richmond	Malcolm U. Pitt Field	Cancelled						
April 17	Longwood	Gray–Minor Stadium	3–1	**R. Garrett** (5–4)	M. Kuebbing (1–3)		129	21–14	9–7
April 18	Longwood	Gray–Minor Stadium	4–6	B. Vick (4–4)	**C. Bach** (2–6)	A. Myers (1)	239	21–15	9–8
April 19	Longwood	Gray–Minor Stadium	0–3	A. Myers (5–3)	**A. Woods** (5–2)	S. Burkett (1)	202	21–16	9–9
April 22	@ James Madison	Veterans Memorial Park	6–1	**C. Henkel** (2–2)	D. Horne (0–1)		623	22–16	–
April 25	@ Winthrop	Winthrop Ballpark	0–1	S. Kmeic (5–3)	**R. Garrett** (5–5)		257	22–17	9–10
April 26	@ Winthrop	Winthrop Ballpark	3–6	T. Shelley (2–1)	**R. Ellis** (0–2)		473	22–18	9–11
April 27	@ Winthrop	Winthrop Ballpark	2–3	J. Strain (6–4)	**R. Ellis** (0–3)		398	22–19	9–12
April 30	VCU	Gray–Minor Stadium	Cancelled						

May (3–4)

Date	Opponent	Site/stadium	Score	Win	Loss	Save	Attendance	Overall record	BSC record
May 9	Campbell	Gray–Minor Stadium	2–6	H. Bowers (8–2)	**R. Garrett** (5–6)	R. Thompson (13)	237	22–20	9–13
May 10	Campbell	Gray–Minor Stadium	2–3	B. Thorson (3–5)	**J. Kelley** (1–1)	R. Thompson (14)	296	22–21	9–14
May 11	Campbell	Gray–Minor Stadium	6–7 (10)	R. Thompson (5–2)	**C. Henkel** (2–3)		237	22–22	9–15
May 13	Old Dominion	Gray–Minor Stadium	4–3	**T. Edens** (3–0)	R. Yarbrough (5–6)	**B. Hawkins** (3)	119	23–22	–
May 15	Charleston Southern	Gray–Minor Stadium	7–6	**R. Garrett** (6–6)	T. Schroff (5–3)	**B. Hawkins** (4)	263	24–22	10–15
May 16	Charleston Southern	Gray–Minor Stadium	2–11	A. Tomasovich (7–2)	**C. Bach** (2–7)		241	24–23	10–16
May 17	Charleston Southern	Gray–Minor Stadium	4–3	A. Weekley (2–6)	**B. Hawkins** (2–0)		219	25–23	11–16
