= 2018 Atlantic 10 Conference baseball tournament =

American college baseball tournament

- Teams: 7
- Format: Double-elimination
- Finals site: Tucker Field at Barcroft Park; Arlington, VA
- Champions: Saint Louis (4th title)
- Winning coach: Darin Hendrickson (3rd title)
- MVP: Drew Reveno (Saint Louis)
- Television: A10 DN

2018 Atlantic 10 Conference baseball standings
	Conf.						Overall
Team	W		L		T	PCT	W		L		T	PCT
Saint Louis ‍‍‍	19	–	4	–	0	.826	35	–	18	–	0	.660
Fordham ‍‍‍	16	–	8	–	0	.667	34	–	17	–	1	.663
George Mason ‍‍‍	16	–	8	–	0	.667	26	–	25	–	0	.510
Richmond ‍‍‍	15	–	9	–	0	.625	31	–	22	–	0	.585
Davidson ‍‍‍	14	–	10	–	0	.583	32	–	19	–	0	.627
VCU ‍‍‍	14	–	10	–	0	.583	34	–	21	–	0	.618
George Washington ‍‍‍	13	–	11	–	0	.542	29	–	24	–	0	.547
Rhode Island ‍‍‍	13	–	11	–	0	.542	24	–	27	–	0	.471
Dayton ‍‍‍	10	–	14	–	0	.417	21	–	31	–	0	.404
Saint Joseph's ‍‍‍	7	–	15	–	0	.318	21	–	27	–	0	.438
St. Bonaventure ‍‍‍	6	–	15	–	0	.286	10	–	33	–	0	.233
UMass ‍‍‍	6	–	18	–	0	.250	15	–	29	–	0	.341
La Salle ‍‍‍	4	–	20	–	0	.167	14	–	41	–	0	.255
‡ – Tournament champion Rankings from Collegiate Baseball

The 2018 Atlantic 10 Conference baseball tournament took place from May 23 to 26. The top seven regular season finishers of the conference's twelve teams met in the double-elimination tournament, which was at Tucker Field at Barcroft Park, the home field of George Washington. As champion, Saint Louis earned the conference's automatic bid to the 2018 NCAA Division I baseball tournament.

== Seeding and format ==
The tournament used the same format adopted in 2014, with the top seven finishers from the regular season seeded one through seven. As the top seed, Saint Louis received a single bye while remaining seeds played on the first day.

== Results ==
Upper round 1	Upper round 2	Upper final	Final
5	Davidson	5
1	Saint Louis	11
5	Davidson	6
4	Richmond	2
1	Saint Louis	5 ^{11}
2	George Mason	4
3	Fordham	3
6	VCU	2
3	Fordham	0
2	George Mason	4
2	George Mason	11
7	George Washington	3
1	Saint Louis	5	–
2	George Mason	0	–
Lower round 1	Lower round 2	Lower round 3	Lower final
7	George Washington	5
6	VCU	1	3	Fordham	0	7	George Washington	4
7	George Washington	4	7	George Washington	5	2	George Mason	9
4	Richmond	4
4	Richmond	8
5	Davidson	4
