= Jason Rathbun =

American baseball coach

Current position
- Title: Head coach
- Team: St. Bonaventure
- Conference: Atlantic 10
- Record: 59–136–1 (.304)

Playing career
- 2000–2001: Herkimer
- 2002–2003: Erskine
- Position: Pitcher

Coaching career (HC unless noted)
- 2005–2022: Herkimer
- 2023–present: St. Bonaventure

Head coaching record
- Overall: 59–136–1 (.304) (NCAA); 556–180 (.755) (NJCAA)
- Tournaments: NCAA: 0–0

Accomplishments and honors

Championships
- NJCAA DIII National Championship (2022) 14* Mountain Valley Conference Regular Season (2005-06, 09-10,12-22) 7* Region 3 Tournament (2006-07, 2010, 2014-15, 18-19)

Jason Rathbun is a baseball coach and former pitcher, who is the current head baseball coach of the St. Bonaventure Bonnies. He played college baseball at Herkimer in 2000 and 2001 before transferring to Erskine from 2002 to 2003. He served as the head coach of the Herkimer Generals (2005–2022).

== Playing career ==
Rathbun grew up in Little Falls, New York, where he attended Little Falls High School, where he was a letterwinner for the Mounties in baseball, basketball and football. He would go on the play college baseball for Herkimer College, where after two years, he earned an opportunity to play at Erskine College. Rathbun was used as a swingman as a junior, starting 7 games and appearing in 7 more as a reliever. He had a 3–2 record and a 5.52 ERA. As a senior, he posted a 4–2 record with a 3.69 ERA in 31 innings.

== Coaching career ==
In April, 2021, Rathbun won his 500th career game for Herkimer. During the 2022 season, he led the Generals to the first ever JUCO World Series championship. In 2022, Rathbun served as pitching coach of the Brewster Whitecaps, a collegiate summer baseball team in the Cape Cod Baseball League.

On August 2, 2022, Rathbun was named the head baseball coach of the St. Bonaventure Bonnies.

== Head coaching record ==
Record table
Season	Team	Overall	Conference	Standing	Postseason
Herkimer County Generals (Mountain Valley Conference (NJCAA)) (2005–2022)
2005	Herkimer County	21–17			Region 3 Final Four
2006	Herkimer County	34–7			NJCAA World Series (8th)
2007	Herkimer County	35–8			NJCAA World Series (3rd)
2008	Herkimer County	22–15			Region 3 Final Four
2009	Herkimer County	33–10			Region 3 Final Four
2010	Herkimer County	35–14			NJCAA World Series (3rd)
2011	Herkimer County	19–17			
2012	Herkimer County	33–11			Region 3 Playoffs
2013	Herkimer County	31–13			Region 3 Final Four
2014	Herkimer County	41–11			NJCAA World Series (3rd)
2015	Herkimer County	48–6			NJCAA World Series (3rd)
2016	Herkimer County	34–11			Region 3 Runner-Up
2017	Herkimer County	27–14			Region 3 Plyoffs
2018	Herkimer County	35–9			NJCAA World Series (8th)
2019	Herkimer County	35–6			NJCAA World Series (8th)
2021	Herkimer County	32–4			Region 3 Runner-Up
2022	Herkimer County	41–7			NJCAA World Series (Champions)
Herkimer County:		556–180 (.755)			
St. Bonaventure Bonnies (Atlantic 10 Conference) (2023–present)
2023	St. Bonaventure	8–40	5–19	12th	
2024	St. Bonaventure	18–31	8–16	11th	
2025	St. Bonaventure	20–29	11–19	10th	
2026	St. Bonaventure	13–36–1	7–23	12th	
St. Bonaventure:		59–136–1 (.304) (NCAA)	31–77 (.287)		
Total:		59–136–1 (.304) (NCAA)			
National champion Postseason invitational champion Conference regular season champion Conference regular season and conference tournament champion Division regular season champion Division regular season and conference tournament champion Conference tournament champion
