= 2014 Big South Conference baseball tournament =

- Teams: 8
- Format: Double-elimination
- Finals site: Winthrop Ballpark; Rock Hill, SC
- Champions: Campbell (3rd title)
- Winning coach: Greg Goff (1st title)
- MVP: Ryan Thompson (Campbell)

2014 Big South Conference baseball standings
	Conf.						Overall
Team	W		L		T	PCT	W		L		T	PCT
North
Liberty ^{x}‍‍‍^{y}	23	–	3	–	0	.885	41	–	18	–	0	.695
Campbell ‍‍‡‍^{y}	18	–	8	–	0	.692	41	–	21	–	0	.661
High Point ‍‍‍	18	–	8	–	0	.692	33	–	22	–	0	.600
Radford ‍‍‍	17	–	10	–	0	.630	33	–	23	–	0	.589
VMI ‍‍‍	11	–	16	–	0	.407	25	–	23	–	0	.521
Longwood ‍‍‍	9	–	18	–	0	.333	22	–	33	–	0	.400
South
Winthrop ^{x}‍‍‍	14	–	13	–	0	.519	27	–	33	–	0	.450
Coastal Carolina ‍‍‍	13	–	13	–	0	.500	24	–	33	–	0	.421
Charleston Southern ‍‍‍	12	–	14	–	0	.462	30	–	26	–	0	.536
Gardner–Webb ‍‍‍	11	–	15	–	0	.423	24	–	31	–	0	.436
Presbyterian ‍‍‍	9	–	18	–	0	.333	19	–	34	–	1	.361
UNC Asheville ‍‍‍	4	–	22	–	0	.154	13	–	40	–	0	.245
x – Division champion ‡ – Tournament champion y – Invited to the NCAA tournament As of June 1, 2014; Rankings from Collegiate Baseball

The 2014 Big South Conference baseball tournament was held from May 20 through 24. The top eight regular season finishers of the conference's twelve teams met in the double-elimination tournament held at Winthrop Ballpark on the campus of Winthrop University in Rock Hill, South Carolina. Campbell won their third tournament title, and first since returning to the league in 2012, to earn the conference's automatic bid to the 2014 NCAA Division I baseball tournament.

== Seeding and format ==
The division winners will be seeded one and two, and the next six finishers from the regular season, regardless of division, will be seeded three through eight based on conference winning percentage only. The teams will play a two bracket, double-elimination tournament with the winners of each bracket facing off in a single elimination final.

Team	W	L	Pct	GB	Seed
North Division
Liberty	23	3	.885	–	1
Campbell	18	8	.692	5	3
High Point	18	9	.667	5.5	4
Radford	17	10	.630	6.5	5
VMI	11	16	.407	12.5	–
Longwood	9	18	.333	14.5	–
South Division
Winthrop	14	13	.519	–	2
Coastal Carolina	13	13	.500	.5	6
Charleston Southern	12	14	.462	1.5	7
Gardner–Webb	11	15	.423	2.5	8
Presbyterian	9	18	.333	5	–
UNC Asheville	4	22	.154	9.5	–

== Results ==
First round
1	Liberty	3
8	Gardner–Webb	0
4	High Point	3
5	Radford	2
8	Gardner–Webb	4
5	Radford	5
2	Winthrop	4
7	Charleston Southern	0
3	Campbell	2
6	Coastal Carolina	9
7	Charleston Southern	2
3	Campbell	6

Second round
1	Liberty	0
4	High Point	9
1	Liberty	4
5	Radford	3
2	Winthrop	3
6	Coastal Carolina	2
6	Coastal Carolina	11
3	Campbell	15

Semifinals
4	High Point	1	1
3	Campbell	3	2
2	Winthrop	6	–
1	Liberty	5	–

Final
3	Campbell	9
2	Winthrop	1

== All-Tournament Team ==
The following players were named to the All-Tournament Team.

Pos	Name	School
INF	Connor Owings	Coastal Carolina
INF	Elijah Trail	Campbell
INF	Kyle Brandenburg	High Point
INF	Dalton Britt	Liberty
OF	TJ Olesczuk	Winthrop
OF	Matt Nadolski	Campbell
OF	Brady Williamson	High Point
C	Steven Leonard	Campbell
P	Josh Strong	Winthrop
P	Ryan Thompson	Campbell
DH	Cody Manzella	High Point
UTL	Ashton Perritt	Liberty

=== Most Valuable Player ===
Ryan Thompson was named Tournament Most Valuable Player. Thompson was a pitcher for Campbell.
