= Dwight Barnett =

Jamaican footballer (born 1982)

Personal information
- Full name: Dwight Barnett
- Date of birth: 1 March 1982 (age 44)
- Place of birth: St. Andrew, Jamaica
- Height: 6 ft 1 in (1.85 m)
- Position: Forward

College career
Years	Team	Apps	(Gls)
2004–2005	Herkimer County Generals		
2006–2007	Lynn Fighting Knights		

Senior career*
Years	Team	Apps	(Gls)
2005	Westchester Flames	12	(4)
2006–2007	Cape Cod Crusaders	34	(24)
2008	Chicago Fire Superdraft - 3rd Round #7 Montreal Impact	9	(3)
2009	Dundalk	6	(0)
2010	Tampa Bay Rowdies	0	(0)
2012	VSI Tampa Flames	2	(0)
2013–	Tampa Marauders	22	(4)
- * Club domestic league appearances and goals as of 1 July 2014

Dwight Barnett (born 1 March 1982) is a Jamaican footballer who currently plays for the Tampa Marauders of the National Premier Soccer League.

== Career ==
=== Youth and college ===
Barnett played two years of college soccer at Herkimer County Community College, captaining the Generals to a 2005 NJCAA Division III National Championship. He scored 53 goals and had 34 assists in his two years at the college, and he helped lead the Generals to two Region III Championships, a National 2nd-place finish in 2004 and a National Championship in 2005. He was named Mountain Valley Conference and Region III Player of the Year in both 2004 and 2005, and NJCAA National Player of the Year in 2005.

He transferred to Lynn University in his junior year, and led his team in points, foals and assists in both his years at the school. He was named Offensive Player of the Year in 2007, was a two-time First and Second team All Sunshine State Conference, an All Regional Team selection in 2006 and 2007, and three Time NSCAA All American.

During his college years Barnett also played in the USL Premier Development League for the Westchester Flames and the Cape Cod Crusaders.

=== Professional ===
Barnett was drafted in the third round (38th overall) of the 2008 MLS SuperDraft by Chicago Fire, and played 5 games in preseason, but was not offered a professional contract by the team. He subsequently signed with Montreal Impact in the USL First Division, and made his professional debut as a substitute against Miami FC, scoring the game winner and his first professional goal in a 2–1 victory. He made his first career start against Toronto FC in a Canadian CONCACAF Champions League qualifier, and went on to make six more appearances for Impact before being released at the end of the year.

He later joined Dundalk.
