= 2018 VMI Keydets baseball team =

American college baseball season

2018 VMI Keydets baseball
- Conference: Southern Conference
- Record: 26–27 (12–12 SoCon)
- Head coach: Jonathan Hadra (4th season)
- Assistant coaches: Casey Dykes; Sam Roberts; Grey Finwood
- Home stadium: Gray–Minor Stadium

2018 Southern Conference baseball standings
	Conf.				Overall
Team	W		L	PCT	W		L	PCT
UNC Greensboro ‍‍‍	18	–	3	.857	37	–	13	.740
Samford ‍‍‍	16	–	8	.667	32	–	24	.571
Wofford ‍‍‍	15	–	9	.625	35	–	21	.625
VMI ‍‍‍	12	–	12	.500	26	–	25	.510
Mercer ‍‍‍	11	–	13	.458	35	–	20	.636
East Tennessee State ‍‍‍	11	–	13	.458	27	–	23	.540
Furman ‍‍‍	9	–	12	.429	24	–	26	.480
The Citadel ‍‍‍	8	–	16	.333	19	–	33	.365
Western Carolina ‍‍‍	5	–	19	.208	7	–	45	.135
‡ – Tournament champion As of May 19, 2018; Rankings from Collegiate Baseball

The 2018 VMI Keydets baseball team represented the Virginia Military Institute during the 2018 NCAA Division I baseball season. The Keydets competed as a member of the Southern Conference, and were led by fourth-year head coach Jonathan Hadra. They played their home games out of Gray–Minor Stadium.

== Personnel ==
VMI lost only one offensive starter from the 2017 season, that being right fielder Tyler Tharp, who hit .348 in 58 games and led the team with 143 total bases. Relief pitchers Blaine Lafin, Jack Gomersall, and Ryan Bennett were the only other seniors lost from the previous season. However, backup infielder Mason Adamson, backup catcher Garrett St. Laurent, and relievers John Fuqua and Liam Roden did not return to the team in 2018.

=== Returning starters ===
Player	Class	Position
Josh Winder	Junior	SP
Brandon Barbery	Senior	SP
Peyton Maddox	Senior	C
Collin Fleischer	Senior	1B
Michael Diodato	Sophomore	2B
Jacob Jaye	Senior	3B
Matt Dunlevy	Senior	LF
Will Malbon	Senior	CF
Matt Pita	Junior	RF
Jake Huggins	Junior	DH

=== Roster ===
2018 VMI Keydets baseball team
Players
Coaches

#	Pos.	Name	B/T	Height	Weight	Year	Home town
1	INF	Michael Diodato	R/R	6 ft 0 in (1.83 m)	175 lb (79 kg)	So	Gloucester, Virginia
3	OF	Will Malbon	L/L	5 ft 11 in (1.8 m)	185 lb (84 kg)	RS Sr	Virginia Beach, Virginia
4	INF	Nathan Eaton	R/R	5 ft 10 in (1.78 m)	180 lb (82 kg)	RS So	Chester, Virginia
5	INF	Noah Cook	R/R	5 ft 10 in (1.78 m)	175 lb (79 kg)	Fr	Danville, Virginia
6	INF	Jacob Jaye	L/R	6 ft 0 in (1.83 m)	185 lb (84 kg)	Sr	Winchester, Virginia
7	INF	Callen Nuccio	L/R	5 ft 9 in (1.75 m)	170 lb (77 kg)	Fr	Waxhaw, North Carolina
8	C	Peyton Maddox	R/R	6 ft 3 in (1.91 m)	185 lb (84 kg)	Sr	Amherst, Virginia
9	INF	Jake Huggins	R/R	6 ft 2 in (1.88 m)	190 lb (86 kg)	Jr	Richmond, Virginia
10	OF	Jordan Ebersole	R/R	6 ft 0 in (1.83 m)	195 lb (88 kg)	So	Vienna, Virginia
11	LHP	Michael Geary	L/L	6 ft 0 in (1.83 m)	180 lb (82 kg)	Jr	Richmond, Virginia
12	OF	Matt Dunlevy	L/R	6 ft 0 in (1.83 m)	180 lb (82 kg)	Sr	Richmond, Virginia
14	LHP	Jon Clines	L/L	6 ft 2 in (1.88 m)	190 lb (86 kg)	So	McLean, Virginia
16	C	Matt Keane	R/R	6 ft 4 in (1.93 m)	190 lb (86 kg)	Jr	Williamsburg, Virginia
17	RHP	Eric Byrd	R/R	6 ft 4 in (1.93 m)	195 lb (88 kg)	Sr	Fredericksburg, Virginia
18	INF	Collin Fleischer	R/R	6 ft 4 in (1.93 m)	215 lb (98 kg)	Sr	Chester, Virginia
19	RHP	Matt Eagle	R/R	6 ft 3 in (1.91 m)	205 lb (93 kg)	Sr	Norfolk, Virginia
20	INF	Will Knight	R/R	6 ft 1 in (1.85 m)	180 lb (82 kg)	Fr	Amherst, Virginia
21	RHP	Austin Murphy	R/R	6 ft 5 in (1.96 m)	190 lb (86 kg)	Fr	Winchester, Virginia
22	OF	Nathan Lloyd	L/R	5 ft 10 in (1.78 m)	185 lb (84 kg)	Fr	Amherst, Virginia
23		Cody Warner	L/R	5 ft 11 in (1.8 m)	180 lb (82 kg)	Fr	Harrisonburg, Virginia
24	RHP	Sam Ewald	L/R	6 ft 2 in (1.88 m)	200 lb (91 kg)	Fr	Nokesville, Virginia
25	RHP	Derek Tremblay	R/R	6 ft 3 in (1.91 m)	195 lb (88 kg)	So	Covington, Virginia
26	C	Ryan Smoot	R/R	6 ft 1 in (1.85 m)	210 lb (95 kg)	Jr	Strasburg, Virginia
27	INF	Josh Hollifield	R/R	6 ft 2 in (1.88 m)	210 lb (95 kg)	So	Weddington, North Carolina
28	RHP	Corey Johnston	R/R	6 ft 0 in (1.83 m)	185 lb (84 kg)	RS So	Chester, Virginia
29	OF	Ryan Hatten	R/R	6 ft 5 in (1.96 m)	215 lb (98 kg)	So	Hendersonville, Tennessee
30	RHP	Michael Spence	R/R	6 ft 2 in (1.88 m)	180 lb (82 kg)	Fr	Charlottesville, Virginia
31	RHP	Tucker Kuykendall	R/R	6 ft 1 in (1.85 m)	180 lb (82 kg)	Fr	Candler, North Carolina
32	LHP	Brady Watts	L/L	6 ft 3 in (1.91 m)	190 lb (86 kg)	RS Fr	Lowgap, North Carolina
33	OF	Matt Pita	R/R	5 ft 10 in (1.78 m)	175 lb (79 kg)	Jr	Richmond, Virginia
35	LHP	Brandon Barbery	L/L	6 ft 0 in (1.83 m)	180 lb (82 kg)	Sr	Manassas, Virginia
36	RHP	Josh Winder	R/R	6 ft 5 in (1.96 m)	210 lb (95 kg)	Jr	Richmond, Virginia
37	RHP	Zak Kent	R/R	6 ft 3 in (1.91 m)	195 lb (88 kg)	So	Heathsville, Virginia
38	LHP	Kyle Staats	L/L	6 ft 2 in (1.88 m)	250 lb (113 kg)	Sr	Manassas, Virginia
39	RHP	Seth Nichols	R/R	5 ft 10 in (1.78 m)	175 lb (79 kg)	Fr	Norfolk, Virginia

Head coach

Jonathan Hadra (4th year)

Assistant coach(es)

Casey Dykes (4th year)
Grey Finwood (1st year)

Pitching coach(es)

Sam Roberts (1st year)

Legend

- (C) Team captain
- (S) Suspended
- (I) Ineligible
- Injured
- Current redshirt

Roster
Last update: February 22, 2018

== Schedule ==
Legend
	VMI win
	VMI loss
	Postponement
**Bold**	VMI team member

2018 VMI Keydets baseball game log
Regular season
February (5–3)

Date	Opponent	Site/stadium	Score	Win	Loss	Save	Attendance	Overall record	SoCon record
February 16	at #19 South Carolina	Founders Park	7–6	**D. Tremblay** (1–0)	A. Hill (0–1)	**M. Eagle** (1)	7,384	1–0	–
February 17	at #19 South Carolina	Founders Park	2–7	C. Morris (1–0)	**Z. Kent** (0–1)		6,627	1–1	–
February 18	at #19 South Carolina	Founders Park	0–9	R. Chapman (1–0)	**B. Watts** (0–1)		6,612	1–2	–
February 20	at #15 Virginia	Davenport Field	9–4	**B. Barbery** (1–0)	G. McGarry (0–1)		3,709	2–2	–
February 23	Lafayette	Gray–Minor Stadium	10–5	**J. Winder** (1–0)	B. Kreyer (0–2)		233	3–2	–
February 23	Lafayette	Gray–Minor Stadium	8–1	**Z. Kent** (1–1)	J. Faraci (0–1)		132	4–2	–
February 25	Lafayette	Gray–Minor Stadium	11–6	**C. Johnston** (1–0)	J. Cain (0–1)		164	5–2	–
February 27	at #14 Virginia	Davenport Field	9–10	D. Ortiz (1–0)	**B. Barbery** (1–1)	B. Sousa (2)	3,177	5–3	–

March (6–10)

Date	Opponent	Site/stadium	Score	Win	Loss	Save	Attendance	Overall record	SoCon record
March 3	Oakland	Gray–Minor Stadium	10–11	J. Lee (1–2)	**J. Winder** (1–1)		198	5–4	–
March 3	Oakland	Gray–Minor Stadium	11–1	**Z. Kent** (2–1)	N. Parr (0–2)		78	6–4	–
March 4	Oakland	Gray–Minor Stadium	11–8	**M. Eagle** (1–0)	C. Bowers (0–3)		188	7–4	–
March 6	at Richmond	Pitt Field	Postponed to Apr. 18						
March 9	UMass Lowell	Gray–Minor Stadium	4–8	J. Riley (1–2)	**J. Winder** (1–2)	C. Metelski (1)	99	7–5	–
March 10	UMass Lowell	Gray–Minor Stadium	5–9	A. Ryan (1–1)	**Z. Kent** (2–2)		244	7–6	–
March 10	UMass Lowell	Gray–Minor Stadium	6–3	**K. Staats** (2–0)	H. Funaro (1–3)	**M. Eagle** (2)	112	8–6	–
March 14	at Old Dominion	Bud Metheny Baseball Complex	4–19	H. Gregory (2–0)	**B. Barbery** (1–2)		361	8–7	–
March 16	at George Washington	Barcroft Park	9–7	**C. Johnston** (1–0)	T. Swiggart (3–1)	**M. Eagle** (3)	128	9–7	–
March 17	at George Washington	Barcroft Park	5–8	A. Wheeler (1–0)	**Z. Kent** (2–3)	I. Pasteur (1)	124	9–8	–
March 18	at George Washington	Barcroft Park	2–4	N. Woods (1–2)	**K. Staats** (2–1)	I. Pasteur (2)	188	9–9	–
March 20	Radford	Gray–Minor Stadium	Postponed to Mar. 27						
March 23	at UNC Greensboro	UNCG Baseball Stadium	1–9	M. Frisbee (4–0)	**J. Winder** (1–3)		528	9–10	0–1
March 23	at UNC Greensboro	UNCG Baseball Stadium	3–6	A. Wantz (3–0)	**M. Eagle** (1–1)		576	9–11	0–2
March 25	at UNC Greensboro	UNCG Baseball Stadium	8–7	**N. Eaton** (1–0)	J. Maynard (4–2)		486	10–11	1–2
March 27	Radford	Gray–Minor Stadium	6–8	A. Nardi (2–2)	**D. Tremblay** (1–1)	C. Higgerson (2)	67	10–12	–
March 28	James Madison	Gray–Minor Stadium	Cancelled						
March 30	The Citadel	Gray–Minor Stadium	0–5	D. Spence (2–2)	**J. Winder** (1–4)		188	10–13	1–3
March 31	The Citadel	Gray–Minor Stadium	12–3	**Z. Kent** (3–3)	A. Bialakis (2–3)		323	11–13	2–3

April (12–7)

Date	Opponent	Site/stadium	Score	Win	Loss	Save	Attendance	Overall record	SoCon record
April 1	The Citadel	Gray–Minor Stadium	12–4	**K. Staats** (3–1)	J. Merritt (2–3)	**M. Eagle** (4)	239	12–13	3–3
April 3	at Longwood	Bolding Stadium	12–6	**E. Byrd** (1–0)	E. Harp (1–4)		198	13–13	–
April 4	at James Madison	Eagle Field	3–4	S. Perkins (3–0)	**M. Eagle** (1–2)		421	13–14	–
April 6	at East Tennessee State	Thomas Stadium	8–7	**C. Johnston** (2–0)	M. Kaczor (2–3)	**N. Eaton** (1)	316	14–14	4–3
April 8	at East Tennessee State	Thomas Stadium	4–6	R. Simpler (3–3)	**D. Tremblay** (1–2)	A. Maher (4)	363	14–15	4–4
April 8	at East Tennessee State	Thomas Stadium	3–7	R. Koesters (2–0)	**K. Staats** (3–2)	J. Giambalvo (4)	363	14–16	4–5
April 10	Longwood	Gray–Minor Stadium	9–11	Z. Potojecki (1–1)	**S. Ewald** (0–1)	J. Peterson (1)	134	14–17	–
April 11	at VCU	The Diamond	4–1	**B. Barbery** (2–2)	B. Wilks (3–1)	**M. Eagle** (5)	1,052	15–17	–
April 13	Western Carolina	Gray–Minor Stadium	11–7	**J. Winder** (2–4)	C. Walter (0–5)		251	16–17	5–5
April 14	Western Carolina	Gray–Minor Stadium	12–9	**D. Tremblay** (2–2)	Z. Franklin (0–4)	**N. Eaton** (2)	607	17–17	6–5
April 14	Western Carolina	Gray–Minor Stadium	5–4	**K. Staats** (4–2)	T. Purus (1–8)	**M. Eagle** (6)	202	18–17	7–5
April 18	at Richmond	Malcolm U. Pitt Field	11–2	**C. Johnston** (3–0)	L. Schipper (0–2)		298	19–17	–
April 20	Furman	Gray–Minor Stadium	12–1	**J. Winder** (3–4)	N. Verbeke (4–3)		1,077	20–17	8–5
April 21	Furman	Gray–Minor Stadium	13–7	**Z. Kent** (4–3)	J. Beatson (1–2)		351	21–17	9–5
April 22	Furman	Gray–Minor Stadium	1–19	J. Bertrand (4–1)	**K. Staats** (4–3)		112	21–18	9–6
April 25	Virginia Tech	Gray–Minor Stadium	9–7	**N. Eaton** (2–0)	A. McDonald (1–6)		222	22–18	–
April 27	at Mercer	Claude Smith Field	4–1	**J. Winder** (4–4)	A. Cox (6–3)		1,010	23–18	10–6
April 28	at Mercer	Claude Smith Field	4–9	S. Gipson (4–0)	**M. Eagle** (1–3)	N. Spear (5)	811	23–19	10–7
April 29	at Mercer	Claude Smith Field	3–11	C. Vann (4–2)	K. Staats (4–4)		422	23–20	10–8

May (3–5)

Date	Opponent	Site/stadium	Score	Win	Loss	Save	Attendance	Overall record	SoCon record
May 1	at Virginia Tech	English Field	3–8	N. Enright (2–3)	**E. Byrd** (1–1)	A. McDonald (5)	485	23–21	–
May 2	Old Dominion	Gray–Minor Stadium	7–6	**Z. Kent** (5–3)	H. Gregory (3–4)	**M. Eagle** (7)	106	24–21	–
May 11	Wofford	Gray–Minor Stadium	12–4	**J. Winder** (5–4)	A. Scott (7–5)		266	25–21	11–8
May 12	Wofford	Gray–Minor Stadium	4–8	A. Higginbotham (6–3)	**Z. Kent** (5–4)		577	25–22	11–9
May 13	Wofford	Gray–Minor Stadium	10–12	A. Garcia (4–1)	**N. Eaton** (2–1)		231	25–23	11–10
May 17	at Samford	Joe Lee Griffin Stadium	2–9	J. Rich (4–5)	**J. Winder** (5–5)		209	25–24	11–11
May 18	at Samford	Joe Lee Griffin Stadium	6–10	H. Skinner (5–2)	**Z. Kent** (5–5)	W. Burns (10)	281	25–25	11–12
May 19	at Samford	Joe Lee Griffin Stadium	8–2	**B. Barbery** (3–2)	S. Jones (3–5)		331	26–25	12–12

Postseason
SoCon Tournament (0–2)

Date	Opponent	Site/stadium	Score	Win	Loss	Save	Attendance	Overall record	Tournament record
May 23	No. 5 Mercer	Fluor Field • Greenville, SC	0–19 (7)	A. Cox (7–3)	**J. Winder** (5–6)		219	26–26	–
May 24	No. 1 UNC Greensboro	Fluor Field • Greenville, SC	7–11	B. Hensley (6–2)	**B. Barbery** (3–3)		212	26–27	–
