= Akeem Ellis =

American basketball player (born 1990)

Personal information
- Born: August 4, 1990 (age 36)
- Listed height: 6 ft 6 in (1.98 m)
- Listed weight: 214 lb (97 kg)

Career information
- High school: John Jay (Lewisboro, New York)
- College: Herkimer County CC (2008–2010); Coppin State (2010–2012)
- NBA draft: 2012: undrafted
- Playing career: 2013–2023
- Position: Power forward

Career history
- 2013–2014: Rio Grande Valley Vipers
- 2014–2015: Brampton A's
- 2015–2016: Cheshire Phoenix
- 2016: Union Tarbes Lourdes
- 2016–2017: Island Storm
- 2018–2019: KW Titans
- 2019: Edmonton Stingers
- 2019: CEB Puerto Montt
- 2020: KW Titans
- 2021: Cafeteros de Armenia
- 2021: Urunday Universitario
- 2022: Pacific Caesar
- 2022: Windsor Express
- 2022: Cimarrones del Chocó
- 2023: Cangrejeros de Monagas
- 2023: RANS Simba Bogor

Akeem Garfield Ellis (born August 4, 1990) is an American former professional basketball player.

== Collegiate career ==
Following his graduation from John Jay High School in Cross River, New York, Ellis competed for Herkimer County Community College at the collegiate level. In both his freshman and sophomore seasons, he was named Mountain Valley Conference Player of the Year. Ellis averaged 16 points, 11 rebounds and 5 assists per game in the second year and was considered one of the top NCAA Division III players in the country. He was also named Region III Male Athlete of the Year. In 2010, he transferred to Coppin State of the NCAA Division I and played college basketball with the Eagles until 2012. He scored a career-high 29 points off the bench vs the Charlotte 49ers on December 19, 2011. Ellis entered the game averaging only 9.2 points per game.

== Professional career ==
On November 1, 2013, the Rio Grande Valley Vipers selected Ellis with the 16th pick in the 6th round of the 2013 NBA Development League Draft. He made his professional debut on December 2, 2013, when he recorded 3 points and 1 rebound in 4.5 minutes off the bench against the Texas Legends. Ellis posted a season-best 27 points and 7 three-pointers in a loss to the Tulsa 66ers. As the season progressed, Ellis became known as one of the team's best offensive threats. In an interview, he said, "Coach (Nevada Smith) knows I have a good jump shot and that I can get it going. I just have to be a spark for my team." By the end of the season, he was averaging 6.1 points, 2.7 rebounds and 1 assist while seeing less than 20 minutes of playing time per game.

On December 18, 2014, Ellis signed with the Brampton A's of the National Basketball League of Canada (NBL). He reunited with Paul Mokeski, who was an associate coach with Ellis' D-League team and held the same position with the A's. He scored a season-high 27 points in a playoff matchup with champions Windsor Express, on April 1, 2015. Ellis led Brampton in points by the end of the 2014–15 NBL Canada season and was one of their top rebounders.

On August 28, 2015, Ellis signed a one-year contract with the Cheshire Phoenix of the British Basketball League (BBL). Head coach John Lavery said, "We are really happy Akeem has committed to the Phoenix for this season. He is a player that will excite our fans and give them something to shout about and a player that can play a variety of positions. He is a perfect fit for our program." Ellis would join the team for training. He was one of many players that Cheshire approached over the summer, including Sean McGonagill.

In the 2018–19 season, Ellis played for the KW Titans on NBL Canada and averaged 17.6 points, 7.4 rebounds, and 2.6 assists per game. He was named to the All-NBLC Third Team.
