= Herkimer County Community College =

Public college in Herkimer, New York US

- Type: Public community college
- Established: 1966; 60 years ago
- Parent institution: State University of New York
- President: Terri Grates Day
- Undergraduates: 1,995 (fall 2025)
- Location: Herkimer, New York, United States; 43.042296°N 75.000916°W
- Campus: Suburban 500 acres (2.0 km^{2})
- Colors: Hunter green and gold
- Nickname: Generals
- Sporting affiliations: National Junior College Athletic Association, Region III, Mountain Valley Athletic Conference
- Mascot: The Herkimer General
- Website: www.herkimer.edu

Herkimer County Community College, or Herkimer College since 2014, is a public community college in Herkimer, Herkimer County, New York. It is part of the State University of New York system.

== History ==
The college was approved by the State University of New York in 1965, and the County Board of Supervisors authorized the college in 1966. The first class, numbering 221 freshmen, entered in the Fall of 1967 at a temporary campus in the Village of Ilion. The temporary campus was the upper floors of the Remington Arms Company. The current, permanent campus came into use in 1971.

In 2014, the college rebranded itself as Herkimer College, although it remains a two-year college.

Herkimer College offers programs leading to associate degrees or certificates in several dozen program areas. The College's Internet Academy offers 20 degrees, three certificates and more than 150 courses, as well as support services, completely online.

Herkimer College began a new A.A.S degree in Esports Management in 2023.

The college had previously partnered with Cazenovia College to offer a bachelor's degrees in "Criminal Justice and Homeland Security" and Inclusive Early Childhood on the Herkimer campus. Cazenovia, however, closed in 2023.

== Athletics ==
Herkimer's athletic program began with five sports in 1970, under the direction of Tom LaPuma, and has grown to include 19 varsity offerings. With its growth has come great success with 60 NJCAA National Championships, 128 Region III Championships, 169 Mountain Valley Collegiate Conference championships, and 31 NJCAA Academic Team of the Year awards as of Spring 2020.

Herkimer's men's lacrosse team had a lengthy streak of success from the late '80s through the 2000s, winning the national championship in 1988, 1989, 1992, 1993, 1994, 1995, 1996, 2003 and 2005. At times, several players were Iroquois, believed to be the largest Native American contingent in a collegiate lacrosse team.

The Herkimer Generals athletics program has won the National Alliance of Two-Year College Athletic Administrators (NATYCAA) Cup four times, in 2014, 2015, 2017, and 2020. The award recognizes Herkimer as first in the nation among two-year non-scholarship athletic programs.

Herkimer College has an esports team competing nationally and the college has an esports arena on campus.

== Notable people ==
=== Sports ===
- Lacrosse players:
  - Delby Powless
  - Brett Queener
  - Regy Thorpe
- Soccer players:
  - Dwight Barnett
  - Triston Henry
  - Ryan Pierce
  - Ben Polk
  - Jordan Saling
  - Jermaine Windster
- Akeem Ellis, basketball player
- Jason Rathbun, baseball player and coach
- Wendall Williams, football player

=== Other ===
- Daniel Burling, politician
- Leigh and Leslie Keno, antiquarians
- Shane Hurlbut, cinematographer
- Arlene Istar Lev, social worker
