= 2015 Southern Conference baseball tournament =

- Teams: 9
- Format: two bracket Double-elimination tournament with championship game
- Finals site: Joseph P. Riley Jr. Park; Charleston, SC
- Champions: Mercer (1st title)

2015 Southern Conference baseball standings
	Conf.				Overall
Team	W		L	PCT	W		L	PCT
Mercer ‍‍‍	16	–	7	.696	31	–	21	.596
Samford ‍‍‍	14	–	10	.583	29	–	24	.547
Wofford ‍‍‍	13	–	10	.565	36	–	20	.643
VMI ‍‍‍	12	–	12	.500	20	–	28	.417
UNC Greensboro ‍‍‍	12	–	12	.500	23	–	25	.479
Furman ‍‍‍	11	–	13	.458	24	–	31	.436
Western Carolina ‍‍‍	11	–	13	.458	21	–	28	.429
The Citadel ‍‍‍	10	–	14	.417	25	–	28	.472
East Tennessee State ‍‍‍	8	–	16	.333	21	–	34	.382
‡ – Tournament champion As of May 16, 2015; Rankings from Collegiate Baseball

The 2015 Southern Conference baseball tournament was held from May 19 through 24 at Joseph P. Riley Jr. Park in Charleston, South Carolina. The annual event determines the conference champion of the Division I Southern Conference in college baseball. The tournament winner earned the league's bid to the 2015 NCAA Division I baseball tournament. This was the last of 20 athletic championships held by the conference in the 2013–14 academic year.

The tournament was originally held from 1950–53, when the Southern Conference was a large conference composed of several small schools and several large schools, the latter of which would form the Atlantic Coast Conference after the 1953 season. The event was re-established in 1984 and has been held every year since. Western Carolina has claimed nine championships, the most of any school, with The Citadel close behind at eight tournament wins. Furman is the only other current school with multiple championships, winning two. UNC Greensboro is the only current and returning member to never win a title. 2014 champion and six-time winner Georgia Southern, along with Elon (two titles), Appalachian State (1 title), and Davidson (no titles) departed the conference after the 2014 season. Mercer will make its first appearance in 2015, while East Tennessee State and VMI return to the league in 2015. Neither ETSU nor VMI won the event during their previous tenures in the league.

The tournament was played in Charleston for the second year in a row after spending the previous two seasons in Greenville, South Carolina. Charleston has hosted the event more than any other city.

== Seeding and format ==
All nine teams will participate in the tournament, with the bottom two seeds playing a single-elimination play-in round. The remaining teams will then be divided into two brackets and play double-elimination tournaments. The winners of each bracket will play a single championship game.

Team	W	L	Pct.	GB	Seed
Mercer	16	7	.696	–	1
Samford	14	10	.583	2.5	2
Wofford	13	10	.565	3	3
VMI	12	12	.500	4.5	4
UNC Greensboro	12	12	.500	4.5	5
Furman	11	13	.458	5.5	6
Western Carolina	11	13	.458	5.5	7
The Citadel	10	14	.417	6.5	8
East Tennessee State	8	16	.333	8.5	9

== Bracket ==
=== Play-In Round ===
Tuesday, May 19
Team	R
#9 East Tennessee State	2
#8 The Citadel	8

=== Bracket One ===
First round
1	Mercer	3
8	The Citadel	2
4	VMI	6
5	UNC Greensboro	5
Lower round 1
8	The Citadel	8
5	UNC Greensboro	4

Second round
1	Mercer	19
4	VMI	7
Lower final
8	The Citadel	10
4	VMI	5

Semifinals
1	Mercer
8	The Citadel

=== Bracket Two ===
First round
2	Samford	8^{10}
7	Western Carolina	7
3	Wofford	16
6	Furman	7
Lower round 1
7	Western Carolina	4
6	Furman	12

Second round
2	Samford	4
3	Wofford	3
Lower final
6	Furman	0
3	Wofford	1

Semifinals
2	Samford
3	Wofford

=== Final ===
Sunday, May 24
Team	R
#2 Samford	0
#1 Mercer	5
