= Fred Handler Park =

Baseball venue in St. Bonaventure, New York

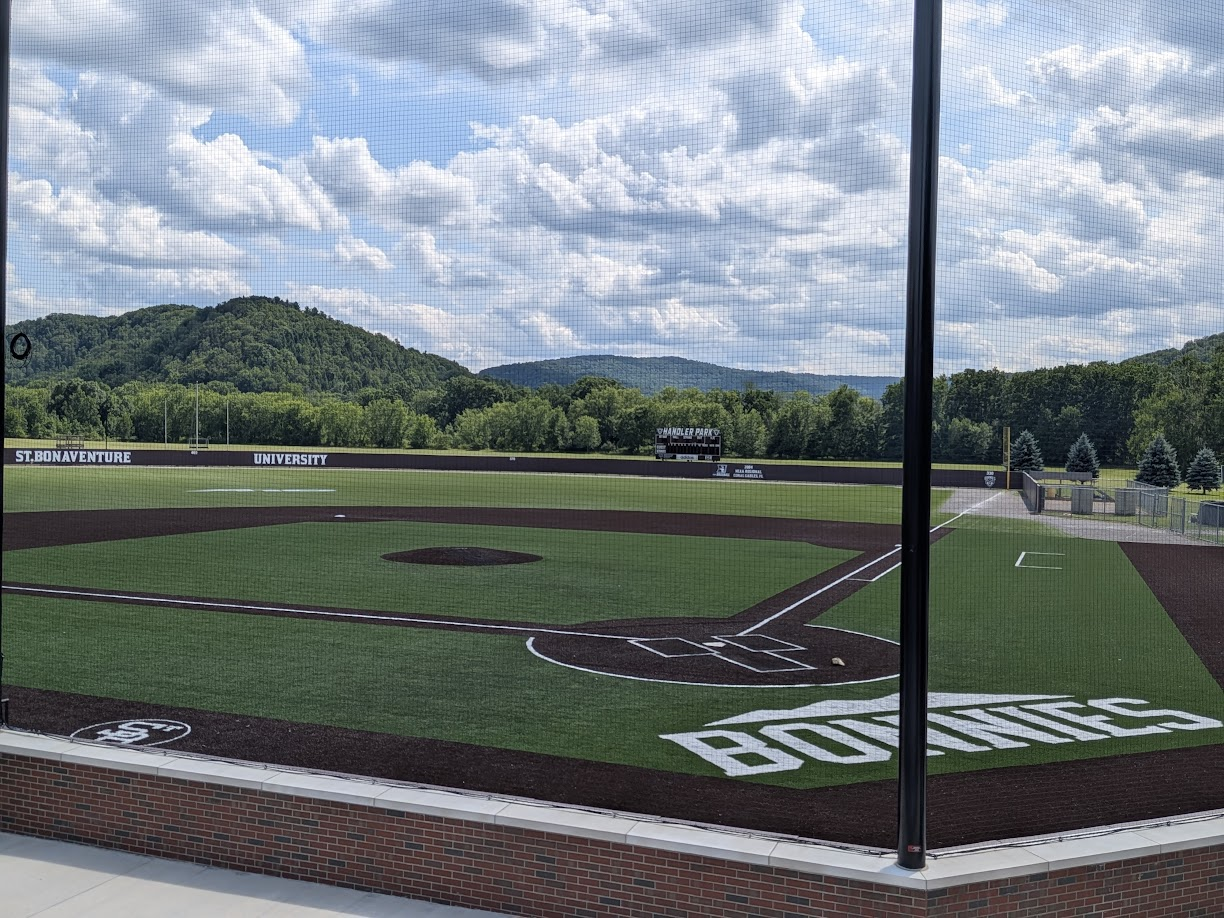
- Interactive map of Fred Handler Park
- Full name: Fred Handler Park at McGraw-Jennings Field
- Former names: McGraw-Jennings Field (1958–2006)
- Location: College Street, St. Bonaventure, New York, USA
- Coordinates: 42.079378°N 78.486478°W
- Owner: St. Bonaventure University
- Operator: St. Bonaventure University
- Surface: Sport Turf XP
- Scoreboard: Electronic
- Field size: Left Field: 330 feet (100 m); Left Center Field: 367 feet (112 m); Center Field: 403 feet (123 m); Right Center Field: 367 feet (112 m); Right Field: 330 feet (100 m)

Construction
- Renovated: 2006

Tenants
- St. Bonaventure Bonnies baseball (NCAA D1 A-10); Olean Oilers (NYCBL) (2012)

Fred Handler Park at McGraw-Jennings Field is a baseball venue in St. Bonaventure, New York, United States. It is home to the St. Bonaventure Bonnies baseball team of the NCAA Division I Atlantic 10 Conference.

== Naming ==
The field is named for John McGraw and Hugh Jennings, who coached the baseball program from 1892 to 1895. Both McGraw and Jennings are members of the National Baseball Hall of Fame. The park is named for Fred Handler, St. Bonaventure head baseball coach from 1960 to 1981, assistant basketball coach from 1960 to 1970, professor of physical education from 1959 to 1997, and member of the university's Athletics Hall of Fame. Previously known simply as McGraw-Jennings Field, the venue's name was changed to its current one on 9 September 2006.

== Renovations and features ==
In 2006, the field underwent extensive renovations due to the US$900,000 donation of trustee and former baseball player Thomas Marra. The renovations included new bullpens, dugouts, fencing, and a Sport Turf XP surface. The field also features a press box and berm seating areas down both foul lines.

== See also ==
- List of NCAA Division I baseball venues
