= Scott Gines =

American football coach and athletic director

Biographical details
- Born: July 1, 1961 (age 65); Spring Arbor, Michigan, U.S.

Coaching career (HC unless noted)
- 1984–1987: Virginia (asssitant)
- 1988–1994: Radford
- 1995–2000: VMI

Administrative career (AD unless noted)
- 2000–2005: Dakota Wesleyan
- 2005–2007: Fairmont State
- 2007–2009: Texas A&M–Kingsville
- 2009–2018: Texas A&M–Kingsville (vice president)
- 2018–2021: Delaware State

Head coaching record
- Overall: 273–357

Accomplishments and honors

Awards
- Big South Coach of the Year (1989)

David Scott Gines (born July 1, 1961) is an American baseball coach and administrator who was the head baseball coach at Radford University (1988–1994) and the Virginia Military Institute (1995–2000) and athletic director at Dakota Wesleyan University (2000–2005), Fairmont State University (2005–2007), Texas A&M University–Kingsville (2007–2009 and 2012–2018), and Delaware State University (2018–2021).

== Early life and education ==
Gines attended the Virginia Military Institute and was a member of the VMI Keydets baseball team. He graduated from VMI in 1983 and later earned a Master of Education in sport psychology from the University of Virginia and a Doctor of Education in leadership from the University of St. Thomas (Minnesota).

== Coaching ==
Gines was an assistant under Virginia Cavaliers baseball coach Dennis Womack from 1984 to 1987. In 1988, he became the head coach at Radford University. He led Radford to its first-ever winning season (1989) and coached the school's first Major League Baseball player (Phil Leftwich). In 1995, returned to VMI as head baseball coach. Gines' teams won 104 wins over six seasons. His 1999 team won a then school-season record 22 games. He retired after the 2000 season as VMI's all-time wins leader.

== Administration ==
In 2000, Gines left coaching to become the athletic director at Dakota Wesleyan University. In 2005, he took the same position at Fairmont State University. In 2007, he became the director of athletics Texas A&M University–Kingsville. He became the school's vice president for institutional advancement in 2009. In 2012, he became the interim athletic director following the resignation of Brian DeAngelis, who was arrested for taking an upskirt video of a 14-year-old girl. In 2013, Gines was named vice president for intercollegiate athletics and campus recreation. He left TAMUK in 2018 to become the director of athletics at Delaware State University. He retired in 2021.
