= 2018 Southern Conference baseball tournament =

- Teams: 9
- Format: two bracket Double-elimination tournament with championship game
- Finals site: Fluor Field at the West End; Greenville, SC
- Champions: Samford (2nd title)
- Winning coach: Casey Dunn (2nd title)
- MVP: Brooks Carlson (Samford)
- Television: SoCon DN

2018 Southern Conference baseball standings
	Conf.				Overall
Team	W		L	PCT	W		L	PCT
UNC Greensboro ‍‍‍	18	–	3	.857	37	–	13	.740
Samford ‍‍‍	16	–	8	.667	32	–	24	.571
Wofford ‍‍‍	15	–	9	.625	35	–	21	.625
VMI ‍‍‍	12	–	12	.500	26	–	25	.510
Mercer ‍‍‍	11	–	13	.458	35	–	20	.636
East Tennessee State ‍‍‍	11	–	13	.458	27	–	23	.540
Furman ‍‍‍	9	–	12	.429	24	–	26	.480
The Citadel ‍‍‍	8	–	16	.333	19	–	33	.365
Western Carolina ‍‍‍	5	–	19	.208	7	–	45	.135
‡ – Tournament champion As of May 19, 2018; Rankings from Collegiate Baseball

The 2018 Southern Conference baseball tournament was held from May 22 through 27 at Fluor Field at the West End in Greenville, South Carolina. The annual event determines the conference champion of the Southern Conference (SoCon) in NCAA Division I college baseball. Samford won their second tournament championship and earned the league's bid to the 2018 NCAA Division I baseball tournament. This was the last of 20 athletic championships held by the conference in the 2017–18 academic year.

The tournament was originally held from 1950 to 1953, when the SoCon was a large conference composed of several small schools and several large schools, the latter of which would form the Atlantic Coast Conference after the 1953 season. The event was re-established in 1984 and has been held every year since. Defending champion Western Carolina has claimed ten championships, the most of any school, with The Citadel close behind at eight tournament wins. Furman is the only other school current school with multiple championships, having won two. East Tennessee State and VMI have never won a title, although they both returned to the conference in 2015 after over ten years in other conferences. Mercer claimed the conference championship in its first ever appearance in 2015.

The tournament was played in Greenville, which had hosted five of the previous nine events.

== Seeding and format ==
All nine teams participated in the tournament, with the bottom two seeds playing a single-elimination play-in round. The remaining teams were then divided into two brackets and played double-elimination tournaments.

Team	W	L	Pct	GB	Seed
UNC Greensboro	15	3	.833	-	1
Samford	12	6	.667	3	2
Wofford	11	7	.611	4	3
VMI	10	8	.556	5	4
East Tennessee State	9	9	.500	6	5
Mercer	10	11	.476	6.5	6
Furman	7	11	.389	8	7
The Citadel	6	12	.333	9	8
Western Carolina	4	17	.190	12.5	9

== Bracket ==
=== Play-In Round ===
Tuesday, May 22
Team	R
#9 Western Carolina	6
#8 The Citadel	5

=== Double-elimination round ===
Upper round 1	Upper round 2	Upper final	Final
1	UNC Greensboro	2
9	Western Carolina	10
9	Western Carolina	0
5	Mercer	15^{7}
4	VMI	0
5	Mercer	19^{7}
5	Mercer	3
2	Samford	10
3	Wofford	8^{10}
6	East Tennessee State	6
2	Samford	4
3	Wofford	0
2	Samford	4
7	Furman	0	2	Samford	12	—
5	Mercer	4	—
Lower round 1	Lower round 2	Lower round 3	Lower final
1	UNC Greensboro	15
1	UNC Greensboro	11	3	Wofford	7	5	Mercer	10
4	VMI	7	1	UNC Greensboro	4	9	Western Carolina	2
9	Western Carolina	8
6	East Tennessee State	8
6	East Tennessee State	5	9	Western Carolina	11
7	Furman	2
