= John Henry Moss Stadium =

Baseball field in Boiling Springs, North Carolina

- Interactive map of John Henry Moss Stadium
- Full name: Bill Masters Field at John Henry Moss Stadium
- Location: Stadium Dr; Boiling Springs, NC
- Coordinates: 35.2433°N 81.6690°W
- Owner: Gardner–Webb University
- Operator: Gardner–Webb University
- Capacity: 550
- Surface: synthetic turf
- Scoreboard: Electronic
- Field size: Left Field: 330 ft (100 m); Left-Center Field: 360 ft (110 m); Center Field: 385 ft (117 m); Right-Center Field: 365 ft (111 m); Right Field: 330 ft (100 m)

Construction
- Opened: September 18, 2010

Tenant
- Gardner–Webb Runnin' Bulldogs (NCAA) (2011-Present)

John Henry Moss Stadium is a baseball stadium home to the Gardner-Webb University Runnin' Bulldogs. It was officially completed on September 18, 2010. The first regular season game played there was February 22, 2011. It has a capacity of about 550, but can be expanded. John Henry Moss was born in Kings Mountain, North Carolina, and was president of the South Atlantic League for 50 years. He was the youngest person to be a president of a professional baseball league, taking over the Western Carolina League in 1948 at the age of 29.

== See also ==
- List of NCAA Division I baseball venues
