= St. Bonaventure Bonnies baseball =

- 2026 St. Bonaventure Bonnies baseball team
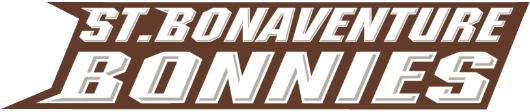
- University: St. Bonaventure University
- Head coach: Jason Rathbun (4th season)
- Conference: Atlantic 10
- Location: St. Bonaventure, New York
- Home stadium: Fred Handler Park
- Nickname: Bonnies
- Colors: Brown and white

NCAA tournament appearances
- 2004

Conference tournament champions
- A-10: 2004

Conference regular season champions
- A-10 East: 2000, 2002

The St. Bonaventure Bonnies baseball team (formerly the St. Bonaventure Brown Indians) is a varsity intercollegiate athletic team of St. Bonaventure University in St. Bonaventure, New York, United States. The team is a member of the Atlantic 10 Conference, which is part of the National Collegiate Athletic Association's Division I. The team plays its home games at Fred Handler Park in St. Bonaventure, New York. The Bonnies are coached by Jason Rathbun.

== NCAA Tournament ==
St. Bonaventure has participated in the NCAA Division I baseball tournament once.

Year	Region	Round	Opponent	Result
2004	Coral Gables Regional	First Round; Lower Round 1	Miami; Florida Atlantic	L 3–6; L 2–14

== Year-by-year results ==
Below is an incomplete table of St. Bonaventure's yearly records. It contains information dating only to 1984, when the program began competing in the Atlantic 10 Conference.

Statistics overview
Season	Coach	Overall	Conference	Standing	Postseason
Records unavailable (1882–1959)
Independent (1960–1968)
1960	Fred Handler	0–4			
1961	Fred Handler	9–4			
1962	Fred Handler	5–5			
1963	Fred Handler	8–4			
1964	Fred Handler	5–6			
1965	Fred Handler	4–8			
1966	Fred Handler	4–5–1			
1967	Fred Handler	4–6			
1968	Fred Handler	4–6			
Records Unavailable (1969)
Independent (1970–1971)
1970	Fred Handler	4–12–1			
1971	Fred Handler	5–9			
Records Unavailable (1972–1983)
Atlantic 10 Conference (1984–present)
1984	Jim Pransky	6–19–1	0–12	5th (West)	
1985	Jim Pransky	17–13	1–8	4th (West)	
1986	Larry Sudbrook	13–26	2–9	4th (West)	
1987	Larry Sudbrook	11–18	4–10	4th (West)	
1988	Larry Sudbrook	26–21	7–9	4th (West)	
1989	Larry Sudbrook	9–25	4–10	4th (West)	
1990	Larry Sudbrook	22–19–1	7–9	3rd (West)	
1991	Larry Sudbrook	28–14–3	7–9	4th (West)	
1992	Larry Sudbrook	6–35 (Note: St. Bonaventure went 22–19 in 1992 but vacated 16 wins for using an ineligible player.)	1–15	4th (West)	
1993	Larry Sudbrook	18–22–1	8–12	7th	
1994	Larry Sudbrook	27–18	11–10	4th	A-10 tournament
1995	Larry Sudbrook	22–23–1	12–9	3rd	A-10 tournament
1996	Larry Sudbrook	19–19	10–10	3rd (East)	
1997	Larry Sudbrook	19–26	9–12	T-3rd (East)	
1998	Larry Sudbrook	21–21	8–10	T-3rd (East)	
1999	Larry Sudbrook	24–22	10–11	T-3rd (East)	
2000	Larry Sudbrook	26–16	13–8	1st (East)	A-10 tournament
2001	Larry Sudbrook	26–19	12–10	5th	
2002	Larry Sudbrook	30–13	16–7	1st (East)	A-10 tournament
2003	Larry Sudbrook	22–19–1	9–11	3rd (East)	
2004	Larry Sudbrook	29–22	14–7	2nd (East)	NCAA Regional
2005	Larry Sudbrook	24–25	8–16	T-4th (East)	
2006	Larry Sudbrook	29–21	21–10	2nd	A-10 tournament
2007	Larry Sudbrook	26–26	15–11	6th	A-10 tournament
2008	Larry Sudbrook	33–25	15–14	6th	A-10 tournament
2009	Larry Sudbrook	27–27	10–17	T-11th	
2010	Larry Sudbrook	17–31	8–19	14th	
2011	Larry Sudbrook	23–23	13–11	T-5th	
2012	Larry Sudbrook	23–25	10–14	8th	
2013	Larry Sudbrook	20–28	9–15	11th	
2014	Larry Sudbrook	12–30	6–17	12th	
2015	Larry Sudbrook	16–28–2	3–21	13th	
2016	Larry Sudbrook	26–22–1	11-13	8th	
2017	Larry Sudbrook	26-22	15-8	3rd	A-10 tournament
2018	Larry Sudbrook	10-33	6-15	11th	
A-10:		722–792–13 (Note: Records incomplete.)	310–444		
Total:		722–729–13 (Note: Records incomplete.)			
National champion Postseason invitational champion Conference regular season champion Conference regular season and conference tournament champion Division regular season champion Division regular season and conference tournament champion Conference tournament champion

== Major League Baseball ==
St. Bonaventure has had 17 Major League Baseball draft selections since the draft began in 1965.

Bonnies in the Major League Baseball Draft
Year	Player	Round	Team
1967	George Carter	52	Mets
1991	Marc Tramuta	45	Dodgers
1993	Jon Phillips	19	Astros
1994	Christopher Kurek	46	Red Sox
1994	Brian Titus	23	Brewers
1997	Ryan LaMattina	58	Mets
1998	Ryan LaMattina	22	Rockies
1999	Vance Cozier	17	Giants
2000	Aaron Bouie	22	Orioles
2006	John Zinnicker	35	Blue Jays
2007	Brian Pellegrini	12	Astros
2010	Jesse Bosnik	13	Dodgers
2015	Steven Klimek	33	Orioles
2016	Darius Vines	32	Astros
2016	Connor Grey	20	Diamondbacks
2017	Cole Peterson	13	Tigers
2017	Aaron Phillips	9	Giants

== See also ==
- List of NCAA Division I baseball programs
