= VMI Keydets baseball =

Baseball team of the Virginia Military Institute

- 2026 VMI Keydets baseball team
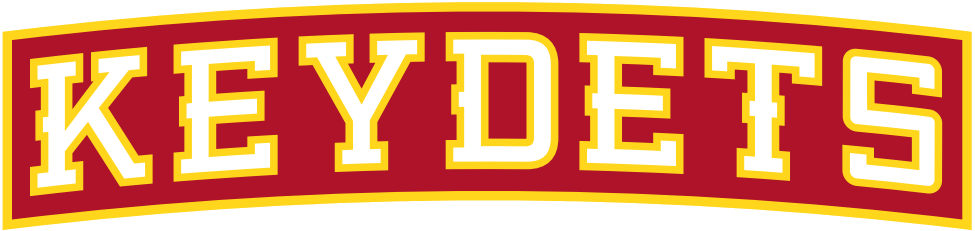
- Founded: 1866
- University: Virginia Military Institute
- Head coach: Sam Roberts (4th season)
- Conference: Southern
- Location: Lexington, Virginia
- Home stadium: Gray–Minor Stadium (capacity: 1,400)
- Nickname: Keydets
- Colors: Red, white, and yellow

The VMI Keydets baseball team represents the Virginia Military Institute in Lexington, Virginia. The team is a member of the Southern Conference, which is part of the National Collegiate Athletic Association's Division I. VMI's first baseball team was fielded in 1866. The team plays its home games at Gray–Minor Stadium in Lexington, Virginia. The Keydets are coached by Sam Roberts.

== History ==
In fall 1866, just two years after the Virginia Military Institute had been burned down by David Hunter and the Union Army, a group of cadets got together and created the Institute's first organized baseball team. It was the first organized team from any sport. In the inaugural season, the Keydets had an astounding mark of 20–1–2, playing among in-state rivals such as Washington and Lee, Virginia, Virginia Tech, Randolph-Macon and Hampden-Sydney, and continuously so for the next several decades.

In 1921, the team started playing at recently built Alumni Memorial Field along with the football team. Both squads had, up to that point, been playing on the Parade Ground. It was not until the 1960s that the baseball team shifted to Patchin Field, and most recently in 2007, began playing in Gray-Minor Stadium. Excluding 2004 to 2014, when they played in the Big South, the Keydets have played for the Southern Conference.

Despite having many winning seasons throughout the 20th century and into the last decade, the Keydets have never been able to make the NCAA tournament. The 1969 team lost to Furman in the SoCon Championship Finals; Furman made the 1969 NCAA University Division baseball tournament with the win. The 1987 and 1993 team each made the tournament final. The 1993 team came closest to breaking the barrier with a run to the Southern Conference finals, and despite being an 8th seed, VMI upended three higher-seeded teams before bowing down to eventual champion Western Carolina.

== Year-by-year results ==
| Year | Record | Conference record | Conference | Coach |
|---|---|---|---|---|
| 1950 | 4–14 | 2–7 | Southern Conference | Frank Summers |
| 1951 | 1–20 | 0–12 | Southern Conference | Frank Summers |
| 1952 | 1–13 | 1–8 | Southern Conference | Vince Ragunas |
| 1953 | 7–7 | 4–4 | Southern Conference | Chuck Noe |
| 1954 | 12–6 | 6–4 | Southern Conference | Chuck Noe |
| 1955 | 12–8 | 6–7 | Southern Conference | Chuck Noe |
| 1956 | 12–10 | 7–7 | Southern Conference | Jack Null |
| 1957 | 8–13 | 4–6 | Southern Conference | Jack Null |
| 1958 | 4–12 | 2–8 | Southern Conference | Jack Null |
| 1959 | 5–11 | 5–10 | Southern Conference | Weenie Miller |
| 1960 | 6–8 | 5–8 | Southern Conference | Weenie Miller |
| 1961 | 7–7 | 6–6 | Southern Conference | Weenie Miller |
| 1962 | 8–7 | 7–7 | Southern Conference | Charlie McGinnis |
| 1963 | 14–11 | 7–7 | Southern Conference | Charlie McGinnis |
| 1964 | 11–12–1 | 5–9 | Southern Conference | Charlie McGinnis |
| 1965 | 15–9 | 8–6 | Southern Conference | Charlie McGinnis |
| 1966 | 10–13 | 6–10 | Southern Conference | Fred Kelly |
| 1967 | 9–11 | 7–9 | Southern Conference | Fred Kelly |
| 1968 | 7–8 | 3–5 | Southern Conference | Chuck Roys |
| 1969 | 10–12 | 8–7 | Southern Conference | Chuck Roys |
| 1970 | 6–13 | 4–9 | Southern Conference | Tom Sawyer |
| 1971 | 5–24 | 1–15 | Southern Conference | Tom Sawyer |
| 1972 | 6–19 | 3–13 | Southern Conference | Phil Tucker |
| 1973 | 3–14 | 0–11 | Southern Conference | Phil Tucker |
| 1974 | 6–14 | 5–9 | Southern Conference | Donny White |
| 1975 | 2–18 | 1–13 | Southern Conference | Jerry Roane |
| 1976 | 6–23 | 2–12 | Southern Conference | Jerry Roane |
| 1977 | 5–19 | 2–12 | Southern Conference | Vern Beitzel |
| 1978 | 2–27 | 0–14 | Southern Conference | Vern Beitzel |
| 1979 | 6–25 | 0–15 | Southern Conference | Vern Beitzel |
| 1980 | 4–22 | 0–12 | Southern Conference | Vern Beitzel |
| 1981 | 3–37 | 0–16 | Southern Conference | Jim Rowsey |
| 1982 | 11–29 | 6–10 | Southern Conference | Donny White |
| 1983 | 11–25 | 5–9 | Southern Conference | Donny White |
| 1984 | 16–18 | 6–7 | Southern Conference | Donny White |
| 1985 | 16–24 | 8–10 | Southern Conference | Donny White |
| 1986 | 15–25 | 7–11 | Southern Conference | Donny White |
| 1987 | 16–16–1 | 8–4 | Southern Conference | Donny White |
| 1988 | 20–20 | 11–7 | Southern Conference | Paul Maini |
| 1989 | 16–23 | 8–7 | Southern Conference | Paul Maini |
| 1990 | 12–26 | 6–8 | Southern Conference | Paul Maini |
| 1991 | 2–35–1 | 1–15 | Southern Conference | Paul Maini |
| 1992 | 11–39 | 4–15 | Southern Conference | Chris Finwood |
| 1993 | 20–29 | 5–15 | Southern Conference | Chris Finwood |
| 1994 | 21–29 | 10–13 | Southern Conference | Chris Finwood |
| 1995 | 19–28 | 10–14 | Southern Conference | Scott Gines |
| 1996 | 17–29 | 7–16 | Southern Conference | Scott Gines |
| 1997 | 13–35 | 6–13 | Southern Conference | Scott Gines |
| 1998 | 14–35 | 7–17 | Southern Conference | Scott Gines |
| 1999 | 22–27 | 13–16 | Southern Conference | Scott Gines |
| 2000 | 19–30 | 11–19 | Southern Conference | Scott Gines |
| 2001 | 15–32 | 8–19 | Southern Conference | Tom Slater |
| 2002 | 10–41 | 1–27 | Southern Conference | Tom Slater |
| 2003 | 25–27 | 16–14 | Southern Conference | Tom Slater |
| 2004 | 23–32 | 4–20 | Big South | Marlin Ikenberry |
| 2005 | 27–28 | 11–13 | Big South | Marlin Ikenberry |
| 2006 | 30–25 | 9–15 | Big South | Marlin Ikenberry |
| 2007 | 34–21 | 10–11 | Big South | Marlin Ikenberry |
| 2008 | 29–26 | 14–7 | Big South | Marlin Ikenberry |
| 2009 | 18–35 | 10–15 | Big South | Marlin Ikenberry |
| 2010 | 33–22 | 13–14 | Big South | Marlin Ikenberry |
| 2011 | 27–24–1 | 14–13 | Big South | Marlin Ikenberry |
| 2012 | 16–36 | 7–17 | Big South | Marlin Ikenberry |
| 2013 | 20–35 | 6–18 | Big South | Marlin Ikenberry |
| 2014 | 25–23 | 11–16 | Big South | Marlin Ikenberry |
| 2015 | 20–28 | 12–12 | Southern Conference | Jonathan Hadra |
| 2016 | 21–35 | 4–20 | Southern Conference | Jonathan Hadra |
| 2017 | 24–34 | 7–17 | Southern Conference | Jonathan Hadra |
| 2018 | 26–27 | 12–12 | Southern Conference | Jonathan Hadra |
| 2019 | 17–41 | 9–15 | Southern Conference | Jonathan Hadra |
| 2020 | 4–13 | 0–0 | Southern Conference | Jonathan Hadra |
| 2021 | 18–29 | 13–17 | Southern Conference | Jonathan Hadra |
| 2022 | 16–40 | 6–15 | Southern Conference | Jonathan Hadra |
| 2023 | 26–29 | 9–11 | Southern Conference | Sam Roberts |
| 2024 | 27–29 | 7–14 | Southern Conference | Sam Roberts |
| 2025 | 27–26 | 6–15 | Southern Conference | Sam Roberts |

== Coaching history ==
| Coach | Tenure | Record | Pct. | Conference Record |
|---|---|---|---|---|
| Frank Summers | 1950-51 | 5-34 | .128 | 2-19 |
| Vince Ragunas | 1952 | 1-13 | .071 | 1-8 |
| Chuck Noe | 1953–55 | 31–21 | .596 | 16–15 |
| Jack Null | 1956–58 | 24–35 | .407 | 13–21 |
| Weenie Miller | 1959–61 | 18–26 | .409 | 17–25 |
| Charlie McGinnis | 1962–65 | 48–39–1 | .551 | 26–28 |
| Fred Kelly | 1966–67 | 19–24 | .442 | 13–19 |
| Chuck Roys | 1968–69 | 17–20 | .459 | 11–12 |
| Tom Sawyer | 1970–71 | 11–37 | .229 | 5–24 |
| Phil Tucker | 1972–73 | 9–33 | .214 | 3–24 |
| Donny White | 1974, 1982–87 | 91–151–1 | .377 | 45–60 |
| Jerry Roane | 1975–76 | 8–41 | .163 | 3–25 |
| Vern Beitzel | 1977–80 | 17–93 | .155 | 2–53 |
| Jim Rowsey | 1981 | 3–37 | .075 | 0–16 |
| Paul Maini | 1988–91 | 50–104–1 | .326 | 26–37 |
| Chris Finwood | 1992–94 | 52–97 | .349 | 19–43 |
| Scott Gines | 1995–2000 | 104–184 | .361 | 54–95 |
| Tom Slater | 2001–03 | 50–100 | .333 | 25–60 |
| Marlin Ikenberry | 2004–14 | 282–307–1 | .478 | 109–166 |
| Jonathan Hadra | 2015–22 | 147–249 | .371 | 63–108 |
| Sam Roberts | 2023-present | 80–84 | .487 | 22–40 |

== VMI and MLB ==
VMI has had 31 Major League Baseball draft selections since the draft began in 1965.

Keydets in the Major League Baseball Draft
| Year | Player | Round | Team |
|---|---|---|---|
| 1965 | Percy Sensabaugh | 51 | Orioles |
| 1966 | Robin Porter | 24 | Pirates |
| 1966 | Percy Sensabaugh | 4 | Senators |
| 1989 | Andy Beasley | 17 | Athletics |
| 1990 | Mark Craft | 11 | Athletics |
| 1990 | Andy Beasley | 4 | Cardinals |
| 1994 | Marc Phillips | 32 | Royals |
| 1995 | David Groseclose | 22 | Rockies |
| 1995 | Ryan Glynn | 4 | Rangers |
| 1996 | Nathan Shepperson | 55 | Pirates |
| 2003 | Phillip Hendrix | 35 | Brewers |
| 2003 | Andy Barden | 19 | Braves |
| 2003 | Jeremy Harper | 14 | Blue Jays |
| 2005 | Matt Acors | 32 | Pirates |
| 2006 | Kelly Sweppenhiser | 44 | Blue Jays |
| 2007 | Corey Bachman | 40 | Cubs |
| 2007 | Chad Rice | 24 | Pirates |
| 2007 | Michael Anton | 12 | Angels |
| 2008 | Michael Roberts | 38 | Brewers |
| 2008 | Trey Barham | 25 | Athletics |
| 2008 | Michael Bowman | 9 | Brewers |
| 2009 | Tanner Biagini | 50 | Athletics |
| 2009 | Travis Smink | 31 | Astros |
| 2010 | Jordan Ballard | 33 | Rockies |
| 2011 | Sam Roberts | 26 | Athletics |
| 2012 | Coby Cowgill | 23 | Rangers |
| 2012 | Adam Lopez | 21 | White Sox |
| 2014 | Connor Bach | 21 | Nationals |
| 2014 | Reed Garrett | 16 | Rangers |
| 2015 | Jordan Tarsovich | 22 | Dodgers |
| 2015 | Matt Winn | 14 | Giants |

== In popular culture ==
The 1938 film, Brother Rat is set at the Virginia Military Institute. The film features Eddie Albert as the VMI baseball team's star pitcher, and Ronald Reagan as his catcher. The film's plot centers on Albert and Reagan as they attempt to win the big baseball game against rival Virginia. Portions of the film were shot on location at the VMI campus in Lexington. In 1940, the film was followed by a sequel, Brother Rat and a Baby, featuring the same lead cast members. The sequel film's plot centered on the since-graduated Albert's attempt to get a job as a baseball coach at his alma mater.

== See also ==
- List of NCAA Division I baseball programs
