= Plumeri Park =

Sports facility in Williamsburg, Virginia, US

Coordinates: 37.289581°N 76.732925°W

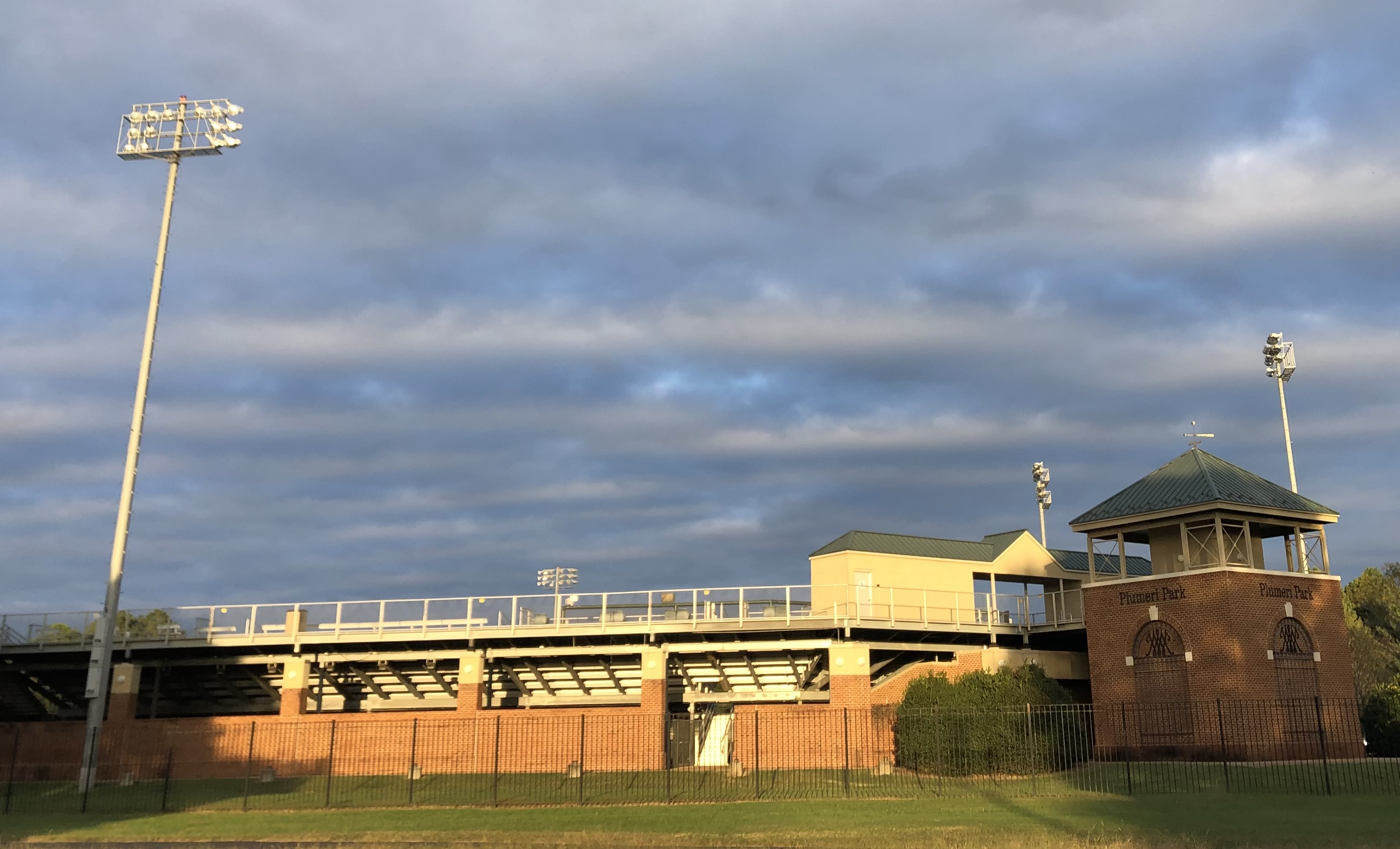
- Interactive map of Plumeri Park
- Location: Williamsburg, Virginia
- Owner: College of William & Mary
- Capacity: 1,000

Construction
- Groundbreaking: 1996
- Opened: March 20, 1999
- Architect: Local contractors

Tenant
- William & Mary Tribe (1999–present)

Plumeri Park is the College of William & Mary Tribe baseball team's home stadium located in Williamsburg, Virginia. It has been in use since 1999. Joseph J. Plumeri II, a William & Mary alumnus (Class of 1966) and former Tribe baseball player who is Chairman & CEO of Willis Group Holdings, funded most of the construction costs, thus the park is named after him. Plumeri Park is a baseball-only facility and it includes a state of the art scoreboard, a 10-foot artificial turf halo behind the home plate area, locker rooms, a press box, concession space, a grandstand, and covered and outdoor batting cages. It seats up to 1,000 people and has stadium lights, enabling the Tribe to host night games. The park's inaugural game was on March 20, 1999, with the William & Mary Tribe hosting the Penn State Nittany Lions and winning 16–10.

== See also ==
- List of NCAA Division I baseball venues
