= Marlin Ikenberry =

American baseball player and coach

Current position
- Title: Head coach
- Team: James Madison
- Conference: Sun Belt
- Record: 258–279

Biographical details
- Born: February 23, 1973 (age 53); Richmond, Virginia, U.S.

Playing career
- 1992–1995: VMI
- Position: Catcher

Coaching career (HC unless noted)
- 1998–2000: William & Mary (asst.)
- 2001–2003: VMI (asst.)
- 2004–2014: VMI
- 2016–present: James Madison

Head coaching record
- Overall: 540–586–1 (.480)
- Tournaments: NCAA: 2–2

Accomplishments and honors

Championships
- Sunbelt Eastern division (2024)

Marlin Ikenberry (born February 23, 1973) is an American baseball coach and former catcher, who is the current head baseball coach of the James Madison Dukes. He played college baseball at VMI for coach Chris Finwood from 1992 to 1995. He served at head coach of the VMI Keydets for 11 seasons, from 2004 to 2014. He was hired on July 22, 2003, the successor to Tom Slater, who departed for a coaching position at the University of Florida. Ikenberry resigned the position to after the 2014 season to pursue a business opportunity.

Ikenberry is a 1995 graduate of VMI. He is the Keydets' winningest head baseball coach, as well as the program's longest tenured head coach. He had a career coaching record of 282–307–1 (.475) in his eleven seasons at VMI.

== Playing career ==
As a cadet at VMI, Ikenberry played catcher and started all 4 years. He caught for former major league pitcher Ryan Glynn who played for the Texas Rangers, Toronto Blue Jays, and Oakland Athletics. He was a part of both the 1993 team, which made the Southern Conference tournament finals, and the 1994 team, who finished third in the conference and set a then-school record for wins in a season. He graduated in 1995.

== Coaching career ==
=== William & Mary ===
Ikenberry spent three years at the College of William and Mary as an assistant coach and recruiting coordinator in the late 1990s. In his final season with the Tribe, William & Mary went on to win a CAA title as well as a berth in the NCAA tournament. Ikenberry coached major leaguers Brendan Harris and Chris Ray.

=== VMI ===
Ikenberry was initially hired as VMI's recruiting coordinator in 2000, as well as a pitching and catching coach. He was later hired in 2003 as a head coach. After two losing seasons in 2004 and 2005, VMI went 30–25 in 2006, which was the program's first winning season since 1965, a drought of over 40 years. Ikenberry also led the Keydets to winning campaigns in 2007 and 2008, marking the first streak of three straight winning seasons for VMI baseball since 1954 to 1956 (which was the only other occasion). Ikenberry coached automobile dealership mogul, Miles McQuaig. Ikenberry garnered six winning seasons, the same amount the program had in its history before Ikenberry's tenure. He resigned to take on a business opportunity with ARMS software.

=== James Madison ===
Ikenberry was named the head coach of James Madison's baseball team on June 30, 2015. He led the Dukes to a 26–26 record in 2018, the team's best finish since 2011.

== Personal life ==
Ikenberry was born in Richmond, Virginia. His twin brother Merlin and elder brother Steve were both graduates of VMI; Merlin was also a teammate of Marlin's, and they were commonly known as the Fish and the Wizard. Ikenberry is married to his wife Shannon and they have two sons, Owen and Gavin. Merlin (Marlins brother) is married to Tracey and they have three kids named Annabel, Kyla, and Levi.

== Head coaching record ==
Record table
Season	Team	Overall	Conference	Standing	Postseason
VMI Keydets (Big South Conference) (2004–2014)
2004	VMI	23–32	4–20	8th	
2005	VMI	27–28	11–13	5th	
2006	VMI	30–25	9–15	7th	
2007	VMI	34–21	10–11	4th	
2008	VMI	29–26	14–7	3rd	
2009	VMI	18–35	10–15	8th	
2010	VMI	33–22	13–14	6th	
2011	VMI	27–24–1	14–13	6th	
2012	VMI	16–36	7–17	11th	
2013	VMI	20–35	6–18	6th (North)	
2014	VMI	25–23	11–16	5th (North)	
VMI:		282–307–1	109–159		
James Madison Dukes (Colonial Athletic Association) (2016–2022)
2016	James Madison	24–31	13–11	4th	CAA Tournament
2017	James Madison	24–27	7–17	7th	
2018	James Madison	26–26	11–13	7th	
2019	James Madison	31–26	11–13	6th	CAA Tournament
2020	James Madison	10–6	0–0		Season canceled due to COVID-19
2021	James Madison	11–17	6–9	5th (South)	
2022	James Madison	27–26	12–11	5th	
James Madison:			75–87		
James Madison Dukes (Sun Belt Conference) (2023–present)
2023	James Madison	31–25	15–13	7th	SBC Tournament
2024	James Madison	36–25	17–13	T-1st (East)	NCAA regional
2025	James Madison	17–38	10–20	13th	
2026	James Madison	21–32	11–19	13th	
James Madison:		258–279	53–65		
Total:		540–586–1			
National champion Postseason invitational champion Conference regular season champion Conference regular season and conference tournament champion Division regular season champion Division regular season and conference tournament champion Conference tournament champion
