= Gray–Minor Stadium =

Military sports venue in Lexington, Virginia

Gray-Minor Stadium
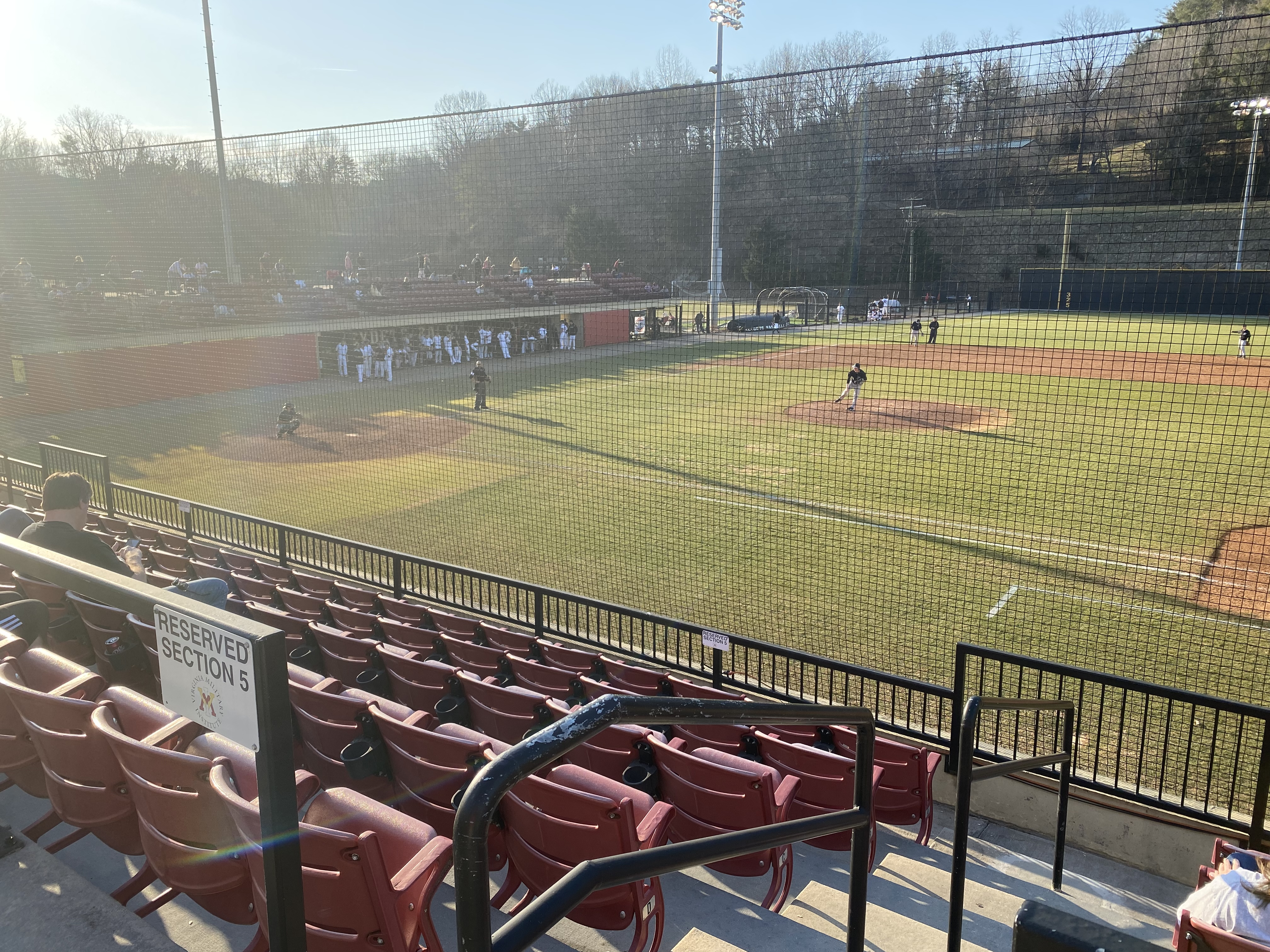
- Interactive map of Gray-Minor Stadium
- Location: Lexington, Virginia
- Coordinates: 37.792096°N 79.440183°W
- Owner: Virginia Military Institute
- Operator: Virginia Military Institute
- Capacity: 1,400
- Surface: Grass
- Scoreboard: Electronic, with Jumbotron
- Record attendance: 1,463 (April 14, 2010, vs. Virginia)

Construction
- Built: 2006
- Opened: February 20, 2007
- Cost: $1.1 Million

Tenant
- VMI (NCAA)

Website
- vmikeydets.com

Gray–Minor Stadium is a 1,400-seat facility home to the Virginia Military Institute (VMI) Keydets baseball team in Lexington, Virginia. It is named after Elmon T. Gray and Gil Minor, graduates of VMI in 1946 and 1963, respectively.

== History ==
Before the construction of Gray–Minor Stadium, Patchin Field was the home of VMI baseball. Nicknamed "The Patch", VMI played there up until the end of the 2006 season. Then, in the off-season of 2006, construction would begin for Gray-Minor. It was five years after the field was renovated, but Patchin Field would serve VMI baseball for another trio of seasons. The project cost around $1.1 million, and was funded by Gray and Minor, along with Bill Paulette, VMI graduate in 1969.

=== 2007 season ===
The 2007 VMI baseball season was the inaugural season for Gray–Minor Stadium. The Keydets opened up playing Florida for three games, in which the underdog VMI surprisingly took 2 of those 3 games. VMI came back to Lexington on February 20 and defeated Bucknell 10–2 in the inaugural game of Gray–Minor Stadium. Through the rest of the year, VMI would finish 23–7 at Gray-Minor, which included arguably the biggest win in school history, as the Keydets beat then #3 Virginia 5–2 that April. The squad would end the regular season 34–19 and 10–11 in the Big South, but finished 34–21 overall with a loss to Liberty and Coastal Carolina in the Big South tournament to end the season.

=== 2008 season ===
In 2008, VMI fell to a 4–12 start, and would lose to Virginia 6–5 in eleven innings on May 13. However, the Keydets would end the year going 25–12, to finish up 29–24, 14–7 in the Big South, and 21–14 at Gray–Minor Stadium, gaining only 8 road victories. In the 2008 Big South Tournament, they were swept by Winthrop and Coastal Carolina again, being out-ran a combined 10–3 to end the season at 29–26.

=== 2009 season ===
VMI had its first losing season in the Gray-Minor era, going 17–33 and 10–15 in Big South play. They went just 11–13 at home, the lowest number of home wins in a season still to this date. VMI did get their first Big South Tournament win in the Gray-Minor era, however, as they defeated Gardner-Webb 13–4. In their second and third games, they lost to Coastal Carolina and Winthrop by scores of 9–4 and 8–4. It would send their season down to 18–35.

=== 2010 season ===
After twenty-two games in the 2010 season, the Keydets were off to their best start in school history at 19–3, 3–1 Big South. On April 14, VMI defeated Virginia 12–3, as Virginia was #1 in the nation at that time. Gray–Minor Stadium was sold out, and at that point, VMI was 29–5, 10–2 in the Big South. The final 21 games of the season the Keydets would go 3–18, beating Radford, Winthrop, and Presbyterian College just once each. They would end the year 32–20, 13–14 Big South. In the tournament, a 7–4 win over UNC-Asheville would be followed by losses to Coastal Carolina and Winthrop, ending their year at 33–22.

=== 2011 season ===
The 2011 squad started off with a sweep at the hands of then #10 Florida State. The season went up and down from there, the biggest win an 8–2 defeat over James Madison, ranked #27 at the time on March 8. The Keydets went 2–2 in a three-team tournament hosted by Oregon State in Corvallis, Oregon. In the closing days of the regular season, VMI went 5–1 in the Big South with a sweep of UNC Asheville and 2 more wins over High Point.

The 2011 Big South Conference baseball tournament was held in Lexington, and VMI opened with Radford in the opening single-elimination game, although they played as the road team. They lost 3–1, ending their year at 27–24–1.

== Features ==
The construction of Gray-Minor had numerous new features and facilities for VMI baseball. Patchin Field had small seating composed of aluminum bench seats. Gray–Minor Stadium holds 1,400 seats, over 700 of which are seat-backed with cup holders for everyone. In addition to that are new and rebuilt dugouts, a new scoreboard with a video-board, handicapped seating, elevators, enlarged restrooms, concession stands, and a glass press box with a new audio system. Gray-Minor also gives players expanded locker rooms, including a visitors' locker room and a trainer's room. Locker rooms had new audio and visual equipment.

== Current major league players ==
VMI currently has 7 alumni in the minor leagues, 2 of which are playing in Double-A.

Name	Position	Team	Affiliate
Michael Bowman	P	Huntsville Stars (AA)	Milwaukee
Trey Barham	P	Midland RockHounds (AA)	Oakland
Michael Roberts	C	Brevard County Manatees (A)	Milwaukee
Travis Smink	P	Tri-City ValleyCats (A)	Houston
Sam Roberts	SS	Vermont Lake Monsters (A)	Oakland
Tanner Biagini	3B	Hudson Valley Renegades (A)	Tampa Bay
Jordan Ballard	1B	Tri-City Dust Devils (A)	Colorado

== See also ==
- List of NCAA Division I baseball venues
