= 2026 East Tennessee State Buccaneers baseball team =

American college baseball season

2026 East Tennessee State Buccaneers baseball
- Conference: Southern Conference
- Record: 30–23 (10–11 SoCon)
- Head coach: Joe Pennucci (9th season)
- Assistant coaches: Canyon McWilliams (1st season); JD Yakubinis (1st season); Morgan Little (1st season)
- Hitting coach: Chad Marshall (5th season)
- Pitching coach: Jamie Pinzino (6th season)
- Home stadium: Thomas Stadium

2026 Southern Conference baseball standings
	Conf.				Overall
Team	W		L	PCT	W		L	PCT
Mercer ‍†‍‍	15	–	6	.714	44	–	15	.746
Western Carolina ‍‍‍	14	–	7	.667	36	–	23	.610
Samford ‍‍‍	12	–	9	.571	31	–	25	.554
Wofford ‍‍‍	12	–	9	.571	34	–	22	.607
The Citadel ‍‍‡‍^{y}	11	–	10	.524	36	–	26	.581
East Tennessee State ‍‍‍	10	–	11	.476	30	–	23	.566
UNC Greensboro ‍‍‍	7	–	14	.333	23	–	33	.411
VMI ‍‍‍	3	–	18	.143	28	–	27	.509
† – Conference champion ‡ – Tournament champion y – Invited to the NCAA tournament As of May 31, 2026; Rankings from D1Baseball

The 2026 East Tennessee State Buccaneers baseball team represented East Tennessee State University during the 2026 NCAA Division I baseball season. The Buccaneers played their home games at Thomas Stadium. They were led by ninth-year head coach, Joe Pennucci.

== Preseason ==
=== Coaches poll ===
The coaches poll was released on February 5, 2026. ETSU was selected to finish third in the conference.

SoCon coaches poll
Predicted finish	Team	Votes (1st place)
1	Samford	45 (4)
2	Mercer	44 (3)
3	ETSU	38 (1)
4	The Citadel	30
5	Western Carolina	24
6	UNCG	16
7	VMI	14
8	Wofford	13

=== Awards and honors ===
==== Preseason SoCon awards and honors ====
Preseason All-SoCon Team
Player	No.	Position	Class	Designation
Michael Harpster	26	SP	Junior	First Team
Derek McCarley	5	RP	Redshirt Senior	First Team
Jamie Palmese	1	OF	Junior	First Team
Tristan Curless	32	1B	Senior	Second Team
Axel Melendez	13	OF	Sophomore	Second Team

== Personnel ==
=== Roster ===
2026 East Tennessee State Buccaneers baseball team
Players
Coaches

#	Pos.	Name	B/T	Height	Weight	Year	Home town
1	OF	Jamie Palmese	R/R	5 ft 11 in (1.8 m)	190 lb (86 kg)	Jr	Berlin, CT
2	INF	Henry Ferguson	R/R	6 ft 0 in (1.83 m)	180 lb (82 kg)	So	Knoxville, TN
3	RHP	Colin Eaton	R/R	5 ft 10 in (1.78 m)	175 lb (79 kg)	Sr	Cartersville, GA
4	C	Ty Galusky	L/R	6 ft 0 in (1.83 m)	210 lb (95 kg)	Jr	Morgantown, WV
5	LHP	Derek McCarley	L/L	5 ft 10 in (1.78 m)	175 lb (79 kg)	RS Sr	Seymour, TN
6	INF	Griffin Sorrow	R/R	5 ft 9 in (1.75 m)	180 lb (82 kg)	Jr	Fayetteville, GA
7	C	Mason Ault	R/R	6 ft 0 in (1.83 m)	200 lb (91 kg)	Fr	Ancaster, ON
8	RHP	Logan Grass	R/R	5 ft 11 in (1.8 m)	185 lb (84 kg)	So	Acworth, GA
9	INF	Luke Matlock	R/R	6 ft 0 in (1.83 m)	200 lb (91 kg)	Jr	Cypress, CA
10	INF	Eli Evans	R/R	6 ft 0 in (1.83 m)	195 lb (88 kg)	So	Knoxville, TN
11	OF	Andrew Palmer	R/R	6 ft 1 in (1.85 m)	205 lb (93 kg)	Fr	Mount Pleasant, SC
12	INF	Ian Guanzon	R/R	6 ft 0 in (1.83 m)	195 lb (88 kg)	Jr	Chico, CA
13	OF	Axel Melendez	L/R	6 ft 0 in (1.83 m)	185 lb (84 kg)	So	Cidra, PR
14	INF	Matt Evans	R/R	5 ft 10 in (1.78 m)	170 lb (77 kg)	Fr	Ellenwood, GA
15	RHP	Evan Rolison	R/R	6 ft 2 in (1.88 m)	210 lb (95 kg)	Jr	Flower Mound, TX
16	OF	Joey Little	R/R	6 ft 1 in (1.85 m)	205 lb (93 kg)	Sr	Hawthorn Woods, IL
17	OF	Nate Conner	L/L	6 ft 1 in (1.85 m)	195 lb (88 kg)	Jr	Johnson City, TN
18	LHP	Thomas Costarelli	L/L	5 ft 11 in (1.8 m)	170 lb (77 kg)	Fr	Islip Terrace, NY
20	RHP	Stratton Scott	R/R	6 ft 2 in (1.88 m)	190 lb (86 kg)	RS Fr	Knoxville, TN
23	INF	Andrew Hill	R/R	6 ft 4 in (1.93 m)	215 lb (98 kg)	So	Knoxville, TN
24	LHP	Tyler Fetterman	R/L	6 ft 1 in (1.85 m)	195 lb (88 kg)	RS So	Aldie, VA
25	LHP	Cody Carwile	L/L	6 ft 4 in (1.93 m)	200 lb (91 kg)	Sr	Fleming Island, FL
26	RHP	Michael Harpster	R/R	6 ft 0 in (1.83 m)	185 lb (84 kg)	Jr	Lynchburg, VA
27	RHP	Reid Brosnan	R/R	6 ft 2 in (1.88 m)	195 lb (88 kg)	RS Fr	Atlanta, GA
28	RHP	Carter Oliff	R/R	6 ft 3 in (1.91 m)	225 lb (102 kg)	Sr	Brentwood, TN
29	LHP	Tyler Kropis	L/L	6 ft 2 in (1.88 m)	200 lb (91 kg)	Fr	Seekonk, MA
30	LHP	Tadan Bell	L/L	6 ft 2 in (1.88 m)	200 lb (91 kg)	RS Jr	Columbus, NE
31	RHP	Andrew Cotten	R/R	6 ft 5 in (1.96 m)	240 lb (109 kg)	Sr	Lexington, SC
32	INF	Tristan Curless	L/L	6 ft 3 in (1.91 m)	195 lb (88 kg)	Sr	Amarillo, TX
33	C	Gabe Juarez	R/R	6 ft 3 in (1.91 m)	240 lb (109 kg)	Sr	Reseda, CA
34	RHP	Jace Hyde	L/R	6 ft 2 in (1.88 m)	220 lb (100 kg)	Jr	Athens, TN
35	OF	Brody Smith	L/R	6 ft 0 in (1.83 m)	180 lb (82 kg)	Fr	Tampa, FL
37	RHP	Jack Vest	R/R	6 ft 1 in (1.85 m)	180 lb (82 kg)	So	Lewisville, NC
39	RHP	Cooper Jones	R/R	6 ft 1 in (1.85 m)	210 lb (95 kg)	Fr	Hixson, TN
40	LHP	Reilly Byers	L/L	6 ft 1 in (1.85 m)	197 lb (89 kg)	Jr	Knoxville, TN
44	RHP	Liam Thatcher	L/R	5 ft 11 in (1.8 m)	200 lb (91 kg)	Jr	Altadena, CA
45	C	Trey Martin	R/R	6 ft 0 in (1.83 m)	190 lb (86 kg)	RS Fr	Haddonfield, NJ

Head coach

Joe Pennucci

Assistant coach(es)

Jamie Pinzino
Chad Marshall
Canyon McWilliams
JD Yakubinis
Morgan Little

Legend

- (C) Team captain
- (S) Suspended
- (I) Ineligible
- Injured
- Current redshirt

Roster
Last update: April 27, 2026

== Game log ==
2026 East Tennessee State Buccaneers baseball game log
(Overall: 30–23; Conference: 10–11); (Home: 19–7; Away: 11–15; Neutral: 0–1)
Regular season (30–22)
February (8–2)
(Home: 8–1; Away: 0–1)

Date	Time (EST)	Opponent	Rank	TV	Venue	Score	Win	Loss	Save	Attendance	Overall record	SoCon record
February 13	2:00 p.m.	Marist*			Thomas Stadium; Johnson City, TN	**W** 6–5	**Cotten** (1–0)	Fierro (0–1)	None	277	1–0	—
February 14	12:00 p.m.	Marist*			Thomas Stadium	**W** 7–5	**Oliff** (1–0)	Mazza (0–1)	**Costarelli** (1)	445	2–0	—
February 14	4:00 p.m.	Marist*			Thomas Stadium	**W** 7–2	**Vest** (1–0)	Sullivan (0–1)	None	536	3–0	—
February 17	4:00 p.m.	at Virginia Tech*			English Field; Blacksburg, VA	**L** 5–7	Swift (1–0)	**Costarelli** (0–1)	Yagesh (1)	893	3–1	—
February 20	3:00 p.m.	Sacred Heart*			Thomas Stadium	**W** 10–0	**Bell** (1–0)	Matuschat (1)	None	318	4–1	—
February 21	11:00 a.m.	Sacred Heart*			Thomas Stadium	**W** 26–3	**Harpster** (1–0)	Katsaros (0–1)	None	268	5–1	—
February 21	3:00 p.m.	Sacred Heart*			Thomas Stadium	**W** 11–8	**Rolison** (1–0)	Parker (0–2)	**Costarelli** (2)	617	6–1	—
February 25	3:00 p.m.	Appalachian State*			Thomas Stadium	**L** 5–8	Tramontana (1–0)	**McCarley** (0–1)	DiRito (2)	240	6–2	—
February 27	3:00 p.m.	Quinnipiac*			Thomas Stadium	**W** 8–2	**Bell** (2–0)	Balcolm (0–3)	None	303	7–2	—
February 28	2:00 p.m.	Quinnipiac*			Thomasa Stadium	**W** 4–3^{(10)}	**Cotten** (2–0)	Alduino (1–1)	None	482	8–2	—

March (11–5)
(Home: 8–1; Away: 3–4)

Date	Time (EDT)	Opponent	Rank	TV	Venue	Score	Win	Loss	Save	Attendance	Overall record	SoCon record
March 1	1:00 p.m.	Quinnipiac*			Thomas Stadium	**W** 16–5^{(8)}	**Scott** (1–0)	Pazdera (0–2)	None	329	9–2	—
March 3	4:00 p.m.	at No. 19 Tennessee*		SECN+	Lindsey Nelson Stadium; Knoxville, TN	**L** 1–7	Frederick (2–0)	Curless (0–1)	None	6,028	9–3	—
March 6	5:35 p.m.	at James Madison*		ESPN+	Veterans Memorial Park; Harrisonburg, VA	**L** 1–11^{(7)}	Kinsler (2–0)	**Bell** (2–1)	None	267	9–4	—
March 7	2:50 p.m.	at James Madison*		ESPN+	Veterans Memorial Park	**L** 4–6	Alexander (3–0)	**Harpster** (1–1)	McGrath (3)	741	9–5	—
March 8	1:00 p.m.	at James Madison*		ESPN+	Veterans Memorial Park	**W** 13–0^{(8)}	**Cotten** (3–0)	Lutz (0–1)	None	376	10–5	—
March 13	3:00 p.m.	Bradley*			Thomas Stadium	**W** 12–2^{(7)}	**Bell** (3–1)	Levy (1–1)	None	275	11–5	—
March 14	12:00 p.m.	Bradley*			Thomas Stadium	**W** 15–2^{(7)}	**Harpster** (2–1)	Thompson (0–4)	None	337	12–5	—
March 14	3:25 p.m.	Bradley*			Thomas Stadium	**W** 10–3	**Jones** (1–0)	Scheider (0–2)	None	513	13–5	—
March 15	12:00 p.m.	Bradley*			Thomas Stadium	**W** 15–2^{(7)}	**Rolison** (2–0)	Webb (1–1)	None	471	14–5	—
March 20	6:00 p.m.	at UNC Greensboro		ESPN+	UNCG Baseball Stadium; Greensboro, NC	**L** 3–6	Chapman (2–2)	**Bell** (3–2)	Weaver (1)	406	14–6	0–1
March 21	2:00 p.m.	at UNC Greensboro		ESPN+	UNCG Baseball Stadium	**W** 8–2	**Harpster** (3–1)	Shuey (1–3)	**Rolison** (1)	430	15–6	1–1
March 22	1:00 p.m.	at UNC Greensboro		ESPN+	UNCG Baseball Stadium	**W** 15–8	**Costarelli** (1–1)	Miles (3–1)	**Curless** (1)	360	16–6	2–1
March 24	5:00 p.m.	Virginia Tech		ESPN+	Thomas Stadium	**W** 9–4	**Scott** (2–0)	Exum (0–1)	**Grass** (1)	1,092	17–6	—
March 27	11:00 a.m.	VMI		ESPN+	Thomas Stadium	**W** 6–5	**Oliff** (2–0)	Sipe (4–1)	**Costarelli** (3)	251	18–6	3–1
March 28	3:00 p.m.	VMI		ESPN+	Thomas Stadium	**W** 4–3	**Harpster** (4–1)	Velasquez (1–1)	**Scott** (1)	634	19–6	4–1
March 29	1:00 p.m.	VMI		ESPN+	Thomas Stadium	**L** 4–5	Baker (5–0)	**Scott** (2–1)	None	933	19–7	4–2

April (8–8)
(Home; 3–1; Away: 5–7)

Date	Time (EDT)	Opponent	Rank	TV	Venue	Score	Win	Loss	Save	Attendance	Overall record	SoCon record
April 2	7:00 p.m.	at Samford		ESPN+	JL Griffin Stadium; Birmingham, AL	**L** 7–13	Whitney (1–0)	**Scott** (2–2)	None	577	19–8	4–3
April 3	6:00 p.m.	at Samford		ESPN+	JL Griffin Stadium	**W** 4–3	**Rolison** (3–0)	Spurrier (1–3)	None	433	20–8	5–3
April 4	2:00 p.m.	at Samford		ESPN+	JL Griffin Stadium	**W** 6–4	**Jones** (2–0)	Tommasini (1–1)	**Curless** (2)	333	21–8	6–3
April 7	3:00 p.m.	at Radford*			Carter Memorial Stadium; Radford, VA	**L** 3–4	Baker (1–0)	**Cotten** (3–1)	Howard (1)	108	21–9	—
April 10	5:00 p.m.	at Belmont*		ESPN+	E. S. Rose Park; Nashville, TN	**W** 6–3	**Bell** (4–2)	Marland (3–3)	**Brosnan** (1)	180	22–9	—
April 11	2:00 p.m.	Belmont*		ESPN+	E. S. Rose Park	**W** 8–4^{(7)}	**Harpster** (5–1)	Harvey (0–2)	None	184	23–9	—
April 11	5:00 p.m.	Belmont*		ESPN+	E. S. Rose Park	**L** 8–10	Perry (1–4)	**Jones** (2–1)	Van Ness (1)	180	23–10	—
April 14	3:00 p.m.	at No. 5 Georgia*		SECN+	Foley Field; Athens, GA	**L** 10–12	Farley (4–0)	**McCarley** (0–2)	Scott (2)	2,817	23–11	—
April 17	5:00 p.m.	The Citadel		ESPN+	Thomas Stadium	**L** 8–11	Bowers (2–2)	**Scott** (2–3)	Gibson (4)	762	23–12	6–4
April 18	2:00 p.m.	The Citadel		ESPN+	Thomas Stadium	**W** 5–4	**Curless** (1–1)	Brown (1–3)	None	727	24–12	7–4
April 19	1:00 p.m.	The Citadel		ESPN+	Thomas Stadium	**W** 12–1^{(8)}	**Jones** (3–1)	Coulter (0–1)	None	889	25–12	8–4
April 21	6:00 p.m.	at Appalachian State*		ESPN+	Jim and Bettie Smith Stadium; Boone, NC	**L** 1–3	Tramontana (2–1)	**Scott** (2–4)	Beaty (1)	713	25–13	—
April 24	3:00 p.m.	at Western Carolina			Hennon Stadium; Cullowhee, NC	**L** 10–14	Snyder (6–0)	**Rolison** (3–1)	None	227	25–14	8–5
April 24	6:45 p.m.	at Western Carolina			Hennon Stadium	**W** 4–3	**Harpster** (6–1)	Fordham (4–3)	**Curless** (3)	782	26–14	9–5
April 25	1:00 p.m.	at Western Carolina		ESPN+	Hennon Stadium	**L** 2–13^{(7)}	Myers (4–1)	**Jones** (3–2)	None	619	26–15	9–6
April 28	5:00 p.m.	UNC Asheville*		ESPN+	Thomas Stadium	**W** 10–7	**Vest** (2–0)	Melton (0–2)	**Grass** (2)	377	27–15	—

May (3–7)
(Home; 0–4; Away: 3–3)

Date	Time (EDT)	Opponent	Rank	TV	Venue	Score	Win	Loss	Save	Attendance	Overall record	SoCon record
May 1	6:00 p.m.	at UConn*		UCONN+	Elliot Ballpark; Storrs, CT	**W** 14–7	**Scott** (3–4)	West (4–5)	None	426	28–15	—
May 2	2:00 p.m.	at UConn*		UCONN+	Elliot Ballpark	**W** 6–1	**Bell** (5–2)	Suchy (4–2)	**Curless** (4)	801	29–15	—
May 3	11:00 a.m.	at UConn*		UCONN+	Elliot Ballpark	**L** 3–4	Pudvar (6–3)	**Jones** (3–3)	Shaw (2)	610	29–16	—
May 5	5:00 p.m.	Radford*		ESPN+	Thomas Stadium	**L** 10–12	Noonan (2–1)	**Grass** (0–1)	Hatcher (3)	583	29–17	—
May 8	5:30 p.m.	at Wofford		ESPN+	Russell C. King Field; Spartanburg, SC	**L** 6–7	Bouchard (9–2)	**Scott** (3–5)	None	261	29–18	9–7
May 9	2:00 p.m.	at Wofford		ESPN+	Russell C. King Field	**L** 5–6	Condon (6–2)	**Harpster** (6–2)	Laughlin (1)	384	29–19	9–8
May 10	1:00 p.m.	at Wofford		ESPN+	Russell C. King Field	**W** 9–5	**Jones** (4–3)	Gray (1–3)	None	312	30–19	10–8
May 14	5:00 p.m.	Mercer		ESPN+	Thomas Stadium	**L** 7–9	Fagerstorm (5–1)	**Grass** (0–2)	Ackerman (2)	474	30–20	10–9
May 15	2:00 p.m.	Mercer		ESPN+	Thomas Stadium	**L** 7–9	Garnett (4–0)	**Brosnan** (0–1)	Kersey (5)	502	30–21	10–10
May 16	1:00 p.m.	Mercer		ESPN+	Thomas Stadium	**L** 6–11	Hughes (3–1)	**Curless** (1–2)	None	629	30–22	10–11

Postseason (0–1)
SoCon tournament (0–1)

Date	Time (EDT)	Opponent	Seed	TV	Venue	Score	Win	Loss	Save	Attendance	Overall record	Tournament record
May 20	1:30 p.m.	vs. (7) UNC Greensboro	(6)	ESPN+	Fluor Field; Greenville, SC	**L** 5–6	Lee (2–1)	**Scott** (3–6)	None		30—23	0—1

"#" represents ranking. All rankings from D1Baseball Poll on the date of the contest.
"()" represents postseason seeding in the SoCon Tournament or NCAA Regional, respectively.
= Win, = Loss, = Canceled/Postponed
Bold = **East Tennessee State Buccaneers team member**
* = Non-Conference Game
Schedule Source:

Schedule Notes:

== Rankings ==
Ranking movements Legend: — = Not ranked RV = Received votes
	Week																		
Poll	Pre	1	2	3	4	5	6	7	8	9	10	11	12	13	14	15	16	17	Final
Coaches'	—	—*	—	—	—	—	—	—	—	—	—								
Baseball America	—	—	—	—	—	—	—	—	—	—	—								
NCBWA†	RV	RV	RV	RV	RV	RV	RV	RV	RV	RV	RV								
D1Baseball	—	—	—	—	—	—	—	—	—	—	—								
Perfect Game	—	—	—	—	—	—	—	—	—	—	—								

† NCBWA ranks 30 teams in their preseason poll, but only ranks 25 teams weekly during the season.
* A new poll was not released for this week, so for comparison purposes, the previous week's ranking is inserted in this week's slot.
