= 2026 The Citadel Bulldogs baseball team =

American college baseball season

2026 The Citadel Bulldogs baseball
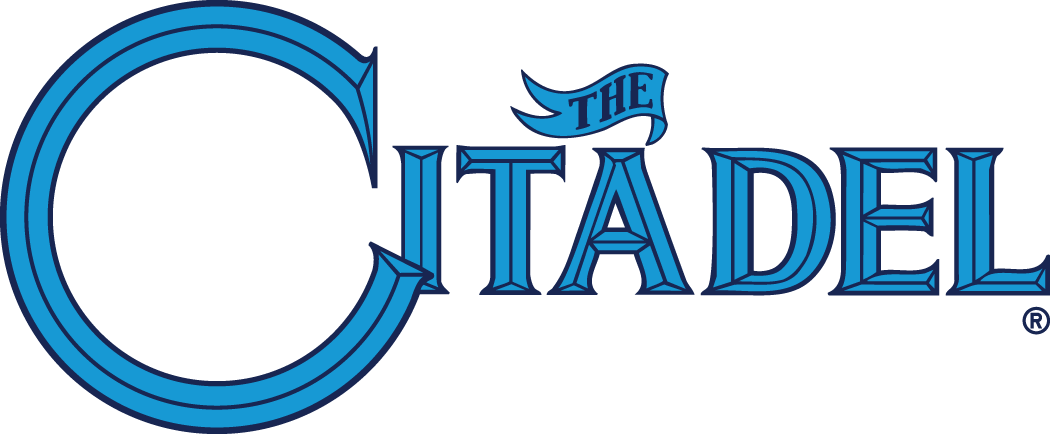

SoCon Tournament champions

NCAA Atlanta Regional, 1–2
- Conference: Southern Conference
- Record: 36–26 (11–10 SoCon)
- Head coach: Russell Triplett (2nd season)
- Hitting coach: David Beckley (2nd season)
- Pitching coach: James Reeves (2nd season)
- Home stadium: Joseph P. Riley Jr. Park

2026 Southern Conference baseball standings
	Conf.				Overall
Team	W		L	PCT	W		L	PCT
Mercer ‍†‍‍	15	–	6	.714	44	–	15	.746
Western Carolina ‍‍‍	14	–	7	.667	36	–	23	.610
Samford ‍‍‍	12	–	9	.571	31	–	25	.554
Wofford ‍‍‍	12	–	9	.571	34	–	22	.607
The Citadel ‍‍‡‍^{y}	11	–	10	.524	36	–	26	.581
East Tennessee State ‍‍‍	10	–	11	.476	30	–	23	.566
UNC Greensboro ‍‍‍	7	–	14	.333	23	–	33	.411
VMI ‍‍‍	3	–	18	.143	28	–	27	.509
† – Conference champion ‡ – Tournament champion y – Invited to the NCAA tournament As of May 31, 2026; Rankings from D1Baseball

2026 The Citadel Bulldogs baseball team represents The Citadel in the 2026 NCAA Division I baseball season. The Bulldogs play their home games at Joseph P. Riley Jr. Park in Charleston, South Carolina. The team is coached by Russell Triplett, in his 2nd season at The Citadel.

The Bulldogs finished the regular season with a 30–24 record, finishing fifth in the SoCon at 11–10. They then swept the SoCon tournament, defeating top seeded Mercer twice and Samford 3–1 in the final to earn an automatic bid to the 2026 NCAA Division I baseball tournament. This was their ninth conference tournament title, and first since 2010, and marks their 14th NCAA Regional appearance. The Bulldogs lost a pair of games to Oklahoma in the Atlanta Regional and recorded their first win in Regional play since 2010 against UIC.

== Previous season ==
In Triplett's first season, the Bulldogs completed the regular season with a 12–9 conference record, good for third place on the SoCon. The team won 30 games for the first time since 2013. They finished 1–2 in the SoCon Tournament.

== Personnel ==
=== Roster ===
2026 The Citadel Bulldogs baseball roster
Pitchers: 7 - Ben Brash - Junior; 11 - Andrew Buffkin - Junior; 12 - Trip Brown - Junior; 13 - Jackson Bottar - Freshman; 14 - Stephen Platte - Freshman; 17 - Jackson Cole - Redshirt Sophomore; 19 - Bryce Coulter - Junior; 22 - Rylee Gibson - Freshman; 23 - Will Holmes - Graduate Student; 24 - Andrew Bowers - Junior; 27 - Michael Gibson - Senior; 28 - Cohen Parker - Freshman; 29 - Aryan Patel - Senior; 33 - CJ Van Slooten - Graduate Student; 34 - Josh Davis - Graduate Student; 35 - Zane Davis - Senior; 36 - Andrew Stanley - Graduate Student; 39 - Steven Trone - Senior; 40 - Riley Ballard - Freshman; 41 - Harrison Keels - Freshman; 43 - Liam Foley - Junior; 44 - Jacob Deacon - Freshman; 50 - Jackson Cooper - Freshman; 52 - Kaden Kiser - Junior; 55 - Jack Thunberg - Graduate Student	Catchers: 4 - Garrett Fulmer - Junior; 9 - Hank Aeppli - Freshman; 21 - Phillips Daniels - Senior; 31 - Noah Cadiz - Redshirt Junior; 37 - Nathan Landeck - Sophomore; 38 - Mason Yokum - Redshirt Freshman; Infielders: 0 - Miles Barbrey - Freshman; 1 - Lane Tobin - Graduate Student; 3 - Sam Dansky - Redshirt Sophomore; 6 - Landon Kahl - Junior; 8 - Zach Snead - Freshman; 16 - Kaine Baber - Freshman; 25 - Zach Hunt - Junior	Outfielders: 2 - Jayden Williams - Freshman; 18 - Matthew Lively - Senior; 20 - Christian Stratis - Redshirt Sophomore; 30 - Rhyder Poppell - Sophomore; - Maddox Floyd - Sophomore; Utility: 10 - Carson Hodges - Freshman; 15 - Jackson Proctor - Junior; 32 - TJ Anderson - Senior

=== Coaches ===
2026 The Citadel Bulldogs baseball coaching staff
- Russell Triplett – Head coach – 2nd year
- David Beckley – Assistant coach – 18th year
- James Reeves – Assistant coach (Pitching) – 2nd year
- Lex Tuten - Assistant coach - 1st year

== Schedule ==
Legend
	The Citadel win
	The Citadel loss
	Cancellation
**Bold**	The Citadel team member
*	Non-Conference game

2026 The Citadel Bulldogs baseball game log (36–25)
Regular season (30–24)

February (4–4)
Date	Opponent	Site/Stadium	Score	Win	Loss	Save	Attendance	Overall Record	SoCon Record
Feb 13	Liberty*	Joseph P. Riley Jr. Park • Charleston, SC	**L** 3–7	Blair (1–0)	**Holmes (0–1)**	None	687	0–1	
Feb 14	Liberty*	Joseph P. Riley Jr. Park • Charleston, SC	**W** 4–3	**Gibson (1–0)**	Decker-Petty (0–1)	None	739	1–1	
Feb 15	Liberty*	Joseph P. Riley Jr. Park • Charleston, SC	**L** 4–5	Zayac (1–0)	**Brown (0–1)**	None	523	1–2	
Feb 20	Marshall*	Joseph P. Riley Jr. Park • Charleston, SC	**W** 4–3	**Holmes (1–1)**	Blevins (1–1)	**Gibson (1)**	935	2–2	
Feb 21	Marshall*	Joseph P. Riley Jr. Park • Charleston, SC	**W** 10–6	**Brash (1–0)**	Albright (1–1)	None	735	3–2	
Feb 22	Army*	Joseph P. Riley Jr. Park • Charleston, SC	**W** 14–8	**Ballard (1–0)**	Penswick (0–2)	None	1,115	4–2	
Feb 28 (DH Game 1)	at No. 21 Florida State*	Mike Martin Field at Dick Howser Stadium • Tallahassee, FL	**L** 2–6	Mendes (3–0)	**Holmes (1–2)**	Abraham (1)	—	4–3	
Feb 28 (DH Game 2)	at No. 21 Florida State*	Mike Martin Field at Dick Howser Stadium • Tallahassee, FL	**L** 1–2(10)	Mebil (1–0)	**Brash (1–1)**	None	6,214	4–4	

March (8–11)
Date	Opponent	Site/Stadium	Score	Win	Loss	Save	Attendance	Overall Record	SoCon Record
Mar 1	at No. 21 Florida State*	Mike Martin Field at Dick Howser Stadium • Tallahassee, FL	**L** 0–2	Moore (1–0)	**Bowers (0–1)**	Knier (1)	4,627	4–5	
Mar 4	Georgia Southern*	Joseph P. Riley Jr. Park • Charleston, SC	**W** 7–1	**Ballard (2–0)**	Kenty (0–1)	None	757	5–5	
Mar 6	at No. 21 Kentucky*	Kentucky Proud Park • Lexington, KY	**L** 5–10	Mattison (2–0)	**Gibson (1–1)**	Bennett (3)	2,962	5–6	
Mar 7	at No. 21 Kentucky*	Kentucky Proud Park • Lexington, KY	**L** 7–12	Bounds (2–1)	**Brown (0–2)**	None	2,166	5–7	
Mar 8	at No. 21 Kentucky*	Kentucky Proud Park • Lexington, KY	**L** 5–13	Bennett (1-0)	**Bottar** (0-1)	None	2,392	5–8	
Mar 10	South Carolina*	Joseph P. Riley Jr. Park • Charleston, SC	**W** 8–3	**Buffkin (1–0)**	Philpott (0–1)	**Gibson (2)**	4,329	6–8	
Mar 13	at UT Martin*	Skyhawk Park • Martin, TN	**L** 2–3	Wright (1–2)	**Trone (0–1)**	Little (4)	279	6–9	
Mar 14	at UT Martin*	Skyhawk Park • Martin, TN	**W** 22–3 ^{(10)}	**Brash (2–1)**	King (0–3)	None	339	7–9	
Mar 15	at UT Martin*	Skyhawk Park • Martin, TN	**W** 8–4	**Brown (1–2)**	Schumacher (1–1)	**Gibson (3)**	188	8–9	
Mar 17	at No. 7 Georgia*	Foley Field • Athens, GA	**L** 5–8	Jameson (1–0)	**Davis (0–1)**	None	1,037	8–10	
Mar 18	No. 19 Clemson*	Joseph P. Riley Jr. Park • Charleston, SC	**L** 3–9	Simpson (4–1)	**Bowers (0–1)**	None	5,298	8–11	
Mar 20	at Mercer	OrthoGeorgia Park • Macon, GA	**L** 0–11 ^{(10)}	Lambert (2–0)	**Holmes (1–3)**	None	845	8–12	0–1
Mar 21	at Mercer	OrthoGeorgia Park • Macon, GA	**L** 4–8	Hugas (6–0)	**Ballard (2–1)**	None	1,500	8–13	0–2
Mar 22	at Mercer	OrthoGeorgia Park • Macon, GA	**W** 3–2	**Gibson (2–1)**	Johnson (1–1)	**Van Slooten (1)**	345	9–13	1–2
Mar 25	Presbyterian*	Joseph P. Riley Jr. Park • Charleston, SC	**W** 9–4	**Brash (3–1)**	Williams (0–1)	None	457	10–13	
Mar 27	Western Carolina*	Joseph P. Riley Jr. Park • Charleston, SC	**W** 4–3	**Buffkin (2–0)**	Fordham (2–2)	None	623	11–13	2–2
Mar 28	Western Carolina*	Joseph P. Riley Jr. Park • Charleston, SC	**W** 13–9	**Ballard (3–1)**	Budd (1–1)	None	606	12–13	3–2
Mar 29	Western Carolina*	Joseph P. Riley Jr. Park • Charleston, SC	**L** 3–16 ^{(7)}	Myers (3–1)	**Deacon (0–1)**	None	711	12–14	3–3
Mar 31	No. 14 Coastal Carolina*	Joseph P. Riley Jr. Park • Charleston, SC	**L** 2–3	Richardson (3–1)	**Van Slooten (0–1)**	Doran (2)	2,259	12–15	

April (10–7)
Date	Opponent	Site/Stadium	Score	Win	Loss	Save	Attendance	Overall Record	SoCon Record
Apr 2	Longwood*	Joseph P. Riley Jr. Park • Charleston, SC	**W** 6–3	**Holmes (2–3)**	Garland (3–2)	**Van Slooten (2)**	1,387	13–15	
Apr 3	Longwood*	Joseph P. Riley Jr. Park • Charleston, SC	**W** 8–4	**Gibson (3–1)**	Gray (0–2)	**Brown (1)**	903	14–15	
Apr 4	Longwood*	Joseph P. Riley Jr. Park • Charleston, SC	**L** 1–5	Seigner (2–0)	**Buffkin (2–1)**	Fordham (5)	633	14–16	
Apr 7	Charleston Southern*	Joseph P. Riley Jr. Park • Charleston, SC	**W** 14–6	**Bowers (1–2)**	Stichweh (1–1)	None	1,019	15–16	
Apr 8	at Winthrop*	Winthrop Ballpark • Rock Hill, SC	**W** 10–8	**Van Slooten (1–1)**	Tompkins (2–1)	**Buffkin (1)**	683	16–16	
Apr 10	at Wofford	Russell C. King Field • Spartanburg, SC	**L** 0–2	Bouchard (6–2)	**Holmes (2–4)**	None	637	16–17	3–4
Apr 11	at Wofford	Russell C. King Field • Spartanburg, SC	**L** 5–6	Condon (4–1)	**Gibson (3–2)**	Davis (5)	874	16–18	3–5
Apr 12	at Wofford	Russell C. King Field • Spartanburg, SC	**L** 3–5	Fitzpatrick (2–4)	**Buffkin (2–2)**	Little (2)	473	16–19	3–6
Apr 14	at Charleston Southern*	CSU Ballpark • North Charleston, SC	**W** 15–5 ^{(7)}	**Ballard (4–1)**	Stephenson (0–1)	None	234	17–19	
Apr 17	at East Tennessee State	Thomas Stadium • Johnson City, TN	**W** 11–8	**Bowers (2–2)**	Scott (2–3)	**Gibson (4)**	762	18–19	4–6
Apr 18	at East Tennessee State	Thomas Stadium • Johnson City, TN	**L** 4–5	Curless (1–1)	**Brown (1–3)**	None	727	18–20	4–7
Apr 19	at East Tennessee State	Thomas Stadium • Johnson City, TN	**L** 1–12 ^{(8)}	Cooper (3–1)	**Coulter (0–1)**	None	889	18–21	4–8
Apr 22	at Georgia Southern*	J. I. Clements Stadium • Statesboro, GA	**W** 10–3	**Davis (1–1)**	Robbins (0–3)	None	1,738	19–21	
Apr 24	UNC Greensboro	Joseph P. Riley Jr. Park • Charleston, SC	**W** 2–1	**Holmes (2–1)**	Chapman (2–6)	**Gibson (5)**	729	20–21	5–8
Apr 25	UNC Greensboro	Joseph P. Riley Jr. Park • Charleston, SC	**W** 10–1	**Buffkin (3–2)**	Weaver (0–4)	None	835	21–21	6–8
Apr 26	UNC Greensboro	Joseph P. Riley Jr. Park • Charleston, SC	**L** 4–9	Horton (3–2)	**Foley (0–1)**	None	543	21–22	6–9
Apr 28	at South Carolina*	Founders Park • Columbia, SC	**W** 4–0	**Davis (2–1)**	Gunther (2–4)	**Gibson (6)**	6,530	22–22	

May (8–2)
Date	Opponent	Site/Stadium	Score	Win	Loss	Save	Attendance	Overall Record	SoCon Record
May 1	at Presbyterian*	Presbyterian Baseball Complex • Clinton, SC	**W** 7–2	**Holmes (4–4)**	Williams (1–3)	None	204	23–22	
May 3 (DH Game 1)	Presbyterian*	Presbyterian Baseball Complex • Clinton, SC	**W** 3–0	**Buffkin (4–2)**	Bowery (0–1)	**Gibson (7)**	307	24–22	
May 3 (DH Game 2)	at Presbyterian*	Presbyterian Baseball Complex • Clinton, SC	**W** 2–1	**Brown (2–3)**	McGregor (1–6)	**Davis (1)**	243	25–22	
May 8 (DH Game 1)	Samford	Joseph P. Riley Jr. Park • Charleston, SC	**W** 10–4	**Holmes (5–4)**	Lee (3–2)	None	482	26–22	7–9
May 8 (DH Game 2)	Samford	Joseph P. Riley Jr. Park • Charleston, SC	**W** 8–0	**Buffkin (5–2)**	Blasche (3–7)	None	829	27–22	8–9
May 9	Samford	Joseph P. Riley Jr. Park • Charleston, SC	**L** 4–5 ^{(10)}	Spurrier (2–3)	**Davis (2–2)**	None	1,167	27–23	8–10
May 12	at No. 20 Coastal Carolina*	Springs Brooks Stadium • Conway, SC	**L** 3–5	Bosch (3–0)	**Coulter** (0–2)	Lynch (5)	3,314	27–24	
May 14	at VMI	Gray–Minor Stadium • Lexington, VA	**W** 9–2	**Holmes (6–4)**	Spiegel (1–5)	None	145	28–24	9–10
May 15	at VMI	Gray–Minor Stadium • Lexington, VA	**W** 7–4	**Gibson (4–2)**	Sipe (5–4)	None	150	29–24	10–10
May 16	at VMI	Gray–Minor Stadium • Lexington, VA	**W** 12–7	**Coulter (1–2)**	Jones (1–3)	None	312	30–24	11–10

Post-Season (6–2)

SoCon Tournament (5–0)
Date	Opponent	Seed	Site/Stadium	Score	Win	Loss	Save	Attendance	Overall Record	SoConT Record
May 20	(8) VMI	(5)	Fluor Field at the West End • Greenville, SC	**W** 21–11 ^{(8)}	**Davis (3–2)**	Spiegel (1–6)	**Gibson (8)**	403	31–24	1–0
May 20	(4) Wofford	(5)	Fluor Field at the West End • Greenville, SC	**W** 13–7	**Buffkin (6–2)**	Bouchard (9–3)	**Bowers (1)**	526	32–24	2–0
May 21	(1) Mercer	(5)	Fluor Field at the West End • Greenville, SC	**W** 9–2	**Brown (3–3)**	Lambert (5–1)	**Gibson (9)**	419	33–24	3–0
May 22	(1) Mercer	(5)	Fluor Field at the West End • Greenville, SC	**W** 14–4 ^{(7)}	**Coulter (2–2)**	Johnson (3–4)	None	440	34–24	4–0
May 23	(3) Samford	(5)	Fluor Field at the West End • Greenville, SC	**W** 3–1	**Holmes (7–4)**	Berry (5–3)	**Gibson (10)**	2,391	35–24	5–0

NCAA Atlanta Regional (1–2)
Date	Opponent	Seed	Site/Stadium	Score	Win	Loss	Save	Attendance	Overall Record	NCAAT Record
May 30	(2) Oklahoma	(3)	Russ Chandler Stadium • Atlanta, GA	**L** 3–8	Rager (4–3)	**Buffkin (6–3)**	Mercurius (1)	3,213	35–25	0–1
May 30	(4) UIC	(3)	Russ Chandler Stadium • Atlanta, GA	**W** 9–8 ^{(10)}	**Gibson (5–2)**	Jakubowski (1–2)	None	3,177	36–25	1–1
May 31	(2) Oklahoma	(3)	Russ Chandler Stadium • Atlanta, GA	**L** 5–15	Wesloski (1–1)	**Coulter (2–3)**	None	3,280	36–26	1–2
