= 2026 VMI Keydets baseball team =

American college baseball season

2026 VMI Keydets baseball
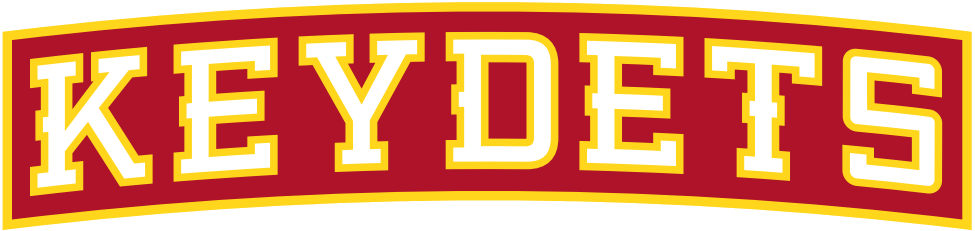
- Conference: Southern Conference
- Record: 27–23 (3–15 SoCon)
- Head coach: Sam Roberts (4th season)
- Assistant coaches: Trey Lyons (1st season); Jonathan Perry
- Hitting coach: Ryan Smoot (2nd season)
- Pitching coach: Alex Crosby (3rd season)
- Home stadium: Gray–Minor Stadium

2026 Southern Conference baseball standings
	Conf.				Overall
Team	W		L	PCT	W		L	PCT
Mercer ‍†‍‍	15	–	6	.714	44	–	15	.746
Western Carolina ‍‍‍	14	–	7	.667	36	–	23	.610
Samford ‍‍‍	12	–	9	.571	31	–	25	.554
Wofford ‍‍‍	12	–	9	.571	34	–	22	.607
The Citadel ‍‍‡‍^{y}	11	–	10	.524	36	–	26	.581
East Tennessee State ‍‍‍	10	–	11	.476	30	–	23	.566
UNC Greensboro ‍‍‍	7	–	14	.333	23	–	33	.411
VMI ‍‍‍	3	–	18	.143	28	–	27	.509
† – Conference champion ‡ – Tournament champion y – Invited to the NCAA tournament As of May 31, 2026; Rankings from D1Baseball

The 2026 VMI Keydets baseball team represents Virginia Military Institute during the 2026 NCAA Division I baseball season. The Keydets play their home games at Gray–Minor Stadium as a member of the Southern Conference. They are be led by fourth-year head coach Sam Roberts.

== Previous season ==
The 2025 season saw the Keydets finish the season with a 27–26 record, marking their first winning season since 2014. In the 2025 Southern Conference baseball tournament, VMI lost in the preliminary round against Western Carolina. VMI's Bradley Garner lead the SoCon with the highest batting average of .389.

== Preseason ==
=== Coaches poll ===
The coaches poll was released on February 5, 2026. VMI was selected to finish seventh in the conference.

SoCon coaches poll
Predicted finish	Team	Votes (1st place)
1	Samford	45 (4)
2	Mercer	44 (3)
3	ETSU	38 (1)
4	The Citadel	30
5	Western Carolina	24
6	UNCG	16
7	VMI	14
8	Wofford	13

=== Awards and honors ===
==== Preseason SoCon awards and honors ====
Preseason All-SoCon Team
Player	No.	Position	Class	Designation
Grayson Fitzwater	20	1B	Senior	First Team
Bradley Garner	23	OF	Junior	First Team
Owen Prince	2	OF	Senior	Second Team

== Personnel ==
=== Starters ===
Lineup
Pos.	No.	Player.	Year
C	19	Cole Raile	Junior
1B	20	Grayson Fitzwater	Senior
2B	43	Kazuya Jordan	Senior
3B	1	Ayden Schnarrs	Sophomore
SS	3	Seth Buchanan	Junior
LF	24	Cole Cook	Sophomore
CF	2	Owen Prince	Senior
RF	23	Bradley Garner	Junior
DH	9	Gabe Jenkins	Freshman

Weekend pitching rotation
Day	No.	Player.	Year
Friday	33	Clark Driscoll	Senior
Saturday	28	Roberto Velasquez	Graduate
Sunday	29	Peyton Dhein	Sophomore

==== Roster ====
2026 VMI Keydets baseball team
Players
Coaches

#	Pos.	Name	B/T	Height	Weight	Year	Home town
1	INF	Ayden Schnarrs	R/R	5 ft 10 in (1.78 m)	190 lb (86 kg)	So	Mosley, VA
2	UTL	Owen Prince	L/R	5 ft 9 in (1.75 m)	175 lb (79 kg)	Sr	Roanoke, VA
3	INF	Seth Buchanan	R/R	5 ft 11 in (1.8 m)	190 lb (86 kg)	Jr	Lebanon, VA
5	C	Will Slater	R/R	6 ft 1 in (1.85 m)	205 lb (93 kg)	So	Richmond, VA
6	INF	JW Kohlmeyer	R/R	5 ft 11 in (1.8 m)	180 lb (82 kg)	Fr	Bristow, VA
7	INF	Easton Ogle	R/R	5 ft 11 in (1.8 m)	175 lb (79 kg)	Fr	Glen Allen, VA
8	OF	Thomas Conrad	R/R	6 ft 2 in (1.88 m)	210 lb (95 kg)	Fr	Chesapeake, VA
9	UTL	Gabe Jenkins	R/R	6 ft 3 in (1.91 m)	210 lb (95 kg)	Fr	Mechanicsville, VA
10	OF	Kealo Smith	R/R	5 ft 8 in (1.73 m)	160 lb (73 kg)	RS Fr	Fishersville, VA
11	C	Brycen Hamilton	R/R	6 ft 4 in (1.93 m)	220 lb (100 kg)	So	Norfolk, VA
12	INF	Max Perry	R/R	6 ft 2 in (1.88 m)	190 lb (86 kg)	So	Charlotte, NC
13	LHP	Hunter Sipe	L/L	6 ft 1 in (1.85 m)	200 lb (91 kg)	Sr	Vinton, VA
14	RHP	Owen Riley	R/R	6 ft 1 in (1.85 m)	205 lb (93 kg)	Jr	Midlothian, VA
16	RHP	Carson Taylor	R/R	6 ft 5 in (1.96 m)	190 lb (86 kg)	Fr	Virginia Beach, VA
17	LHP	Trace Monroe	R/L	6 ft 2 in (1.88 m)	190 lb (86 kg)	Fr	Moneta, VA
18	RHP	Tyler Basset	R/R	5 ft 11 in (1.8 m)	190 lb (86 kg)	RS Fr	Manassas, VA
19	UTL	Cole Raile	R/R	6 ft 0 in (1.83 m)	215 lb (98 kg)	Jr	Radnor, OH
20	INF	Grayson Fitzwater	L/L	6 ft 1 in (1.85 m)	215 lb (98 kg)	Sr	Suffolk, VA
21	LHP	Gavin Biernot	L/L	6 ft 5 in (1.96 m)	220 lb (100 kg)	RS Fr	Chesapeake, VA
22	RHP	Justin Spiegel	R/R	6 ft 0 in (1.83 m)	185 lb (84 kg)	RS So	Chester, VA
23	UTL	Bradley Garner	R/R	6 ft 2 in (1.88 m)	200 lb (91 kg)	Jr	Richmond, VA
24	OF	Cole Cook	R/R	6 ft 2 in (1.88 m)	190 lb (86 kg)	So	Allentown, PA
25	OF	Ayden Albright	R/R	6 ft 0 in (1.83 m)	180 lb (82 kg)	Fr	Fredericksburg, VA
26	C	Benjamin Cardone	R/R	5 ft 9 in (1.75 m)	180 lb (82 kg)	Fr	Bristow, VA
27	UTL	Eli Tyndall	L/R	6 ft 1 in (1.85 m)	190 lb (86 kg)	Fr	Poquoson, VA
28	RHP	Roberto Velasquez	R/R	5 ft 11 in (1.8 m)	210 lb (95 kg)	Gr	Chesapeake, VA
29	LHP	Peyton Dhein	L/L	5 ft 10 in (1.78 m)	170 lb (77 kg)	So	Fort Mill, SC
30	RHP	Noah LaFine	R/R	5 ft 11 in (1.8 m)	190 lb (86 kg)	So	Uniontown, OH
32	RHP	Andrew Jones	R/R	6 ft 0 in (1.83 m)	190 lb (86 kg)	Sr	Midlothian, VA
33	RHP	Clark Driscoll	R/R	5 ft 5 in (1.65 m)	185 lb (84 kg)	Sr	Midlothian, VA
34	LHP	Miles Melescu	L/L	5 ft 9 in (1.75 m)	190 lb (86 kg)	Fr	Chesapeake, VA
35	RHP	George Chevalier	R/R	5 ft 11 in (1.8 m)	165 lb (75 kg)	Fr	Virginia Beach, VA
36	LHP	Gary Ahrens	L/L	6 ft 2 in (1.88 m)	190 lb (86 kg)	Fr	Great Falls, VA
37	LHP	Buddy Baker	L/L	5 ft 11 in (1.8 m)	180 lb (82 kg)	Fr	Suffolk, VA
38	LHP	Nolan Williamson	R/L	6 ft 2 in (1.88 m)	220 lb (100 kg)	Jr	Hanover, VA
39	LHP	Jim Douthat	L/L	6 ft 0 in (1.83 m)	190 lb (86 kg)	RS Fr	Richmond, VA
43	INF	Kazuya Jordan	R/R	5 ft 9 in (1.75 m)	170 lb (77 kg)	Sr	Fredericksburg, VA

Head coach

Sam Roberts

Assistant coach(es)

Ryan Smoot
Alex Crosby
Jonathan Perry
Trey Lyons

Legend

- (C) Team captain
- (S) Suspended
- (I) Ineligible
- Injured
- Current redshirt

Roster
Last update: April 8, 2026

== Schedule ==
2026 VMI Keydets baseball game log (27–23)
Regular season: 27–23 (Home: 21–6; Away: 6–17; Neutral: 0–0)

February: 9–2 (Home: 9–1; Away: 0–1; Neutral: 0–0)
Date	TV	Opponent	Rank	Stadium	Score	Win	Loss	Save	Attendance	Overall	SoCon
February 13 (Note: Part of a doubleheader.)	ESPN+	Delaware State*		Gray–Minor Stadium; Lexington, VA	**W** 10–0^{7}	**Dhein** (1–0)	Lane (0–1)	None	225	1–0	—
February 13	ESPN+	Delaware State*		Gray–Minor Stadium	**W** 24–4^{7}	**Sipe** (1–0)	Valle-Zay (0–1)	None	225	2–0	—
February 14	ESPN+	Delaware State*		Gray–Minor Stadium	**W** 24–4^{7}	**Jones** (1–0)	Carter (0–1)	**Baker** (1)	162	3–0	—
February 14	ESPN+	Delaware State*		Gray–Minor Stadium	**W** 9–4	**Monroe** (1–0)	Vidmar (0–1)	None	162	4–0	—
February 17	ACCNX	at No. 24 Virginia*		Davenport Field; Charlottesville, VA	**L** 2–5	Jaxel (1–0)	**Driscoll** (0–1)	Kapa (1)	3,202	4–1	—
February 20	ESPN+	Maryland Eastern Shore*		Gray–Minor Stadium	**W** 13–3^{7}	**Dhein** (2–0)	Stepner (0–1)	**Taylor** (1)	124	5–1	—
February 21	ESPN+	Maryland Eastern Shore*		Gray–Minor Stadium	**W** 7–3	**Monroe** (2–0)	Torres (0–1)	None	155	6–1	—
February 22	ESPN+	Maryland Eastern Shore*		Gray–Minor Stadium	**W** 14–4^{7}	**Baker** (1–0)	Champey (0–1)	None	153	7–1	—
February 27	ESPN+	Stonehill*		Gray–Minor Stadium	**W** 8–2	**Taylor** (1–0)	Welsch (0–1)	None	105	8–1	—
February 28	ESPN+	Stonehill*		Gray–Minor Stadium	**W** 3–0	**Driscoll** (1–1)	Douglas (0–3)	**Sipe** (1)	209	9–1	—
February 28	ESPN+	Stonehill*		Gray–Minor Stadium	**L** 5–16^{8}	Basgaard (1–0)	**Tyndall** (0–1)	None	209	9–2	—

March: 13–4 (Home: 8–1; Away: 5–3; Neutral: 0–0)
Date	TV	Opponent	Rank	Stadium	Score	Win	Loss	Save	Attendance	Overall	SoCon
March 1	ESPN+	Stonehill*		Gray–Minor Stadium	**W** 7–0	**Velasquez** (1–0)	Curley (0–1)	None	139	10–2	—
March 3		at Mount St. Mary's*		Straw Family Stadium; Emmitsburg, MD	**Canceled (inclement weather)**						
March 6	ESPN+	Western Illinois*		Gray–Minor Stadium	**W** 8–7^{7}	**Baker** (2–0)	Dubois (0–2)	None	119	11–2	—
March 6	ESPN+	Western Illinois*		Gray–Minor Stadium	**W** 10–7^{7}	**Bassett** (1–0)	Humphrey (0–2)	None	119	12–2	—
March 7	ESPN+	Western Illinois*		Gray–Minor Stadium	**W** 16–6	**Tyndall** (1–1)	Steinhoff (0–1)	None	174	13–2	—
March 8	ESPN+	Western Illinois*		Gray–Minor Stadium	**W** 9–8	**Baker** (3–0)	Humphrey (0–3)	None	122	14–2	—
March 11	ESPN+	at Norfolk State*		Marty L. Miller Field; Norfolk, VA	**W** 15–10	**Sipe** (2–0)	Snoh (0–1)	None	332	15–2	—
March 14	ESPN+	Cornell*		Gray–Minor Stadium	**L** 4–7	Mayfield (1–3)	**Dhein** (2–1)	Foster (2)	256	15–3	—
March 14	ESPN+	Cornell*		Gray–Minor Stadium	**W** 8–0	**Driscoll** (2–1)	Holcombe (0–3)	None	256	16–3	—
March 15	ESPN+	Cornell*		Gray–Minor Stadium	**W** 7–4	**Baker** (4–0)	Foster (0–1)	None	301	17–3	—
March 20	ESPN+	at Radford*		Carter Memorial Stadium; Radford, VA	**L** 4–9	Ladd (1–0)	**Dhein** (2–2)	None	152	17–4	—
March 21	ESPN+	Radford*		Gray–Minor Stadium	**W** 11–6	**Driscoll** (3–1)	Costello (0–3)	None	350	18–4	—
March 22	ESPN+	at Radford*		Carter Memorial Stadium	**W** 9–1	**Sipe** (3–0)	Nace (0–2)	None	208	19–4	—
March 25	ESPN+	at George Washington*		Barcroft Park; Arlington, VA	**W** 8–5	**Sipe** (4–0)	Marks (0–2)	**Baker** (2)	67	20–4	—
March 27	ESPN+	at ETSU		Thomas Stadium; Johnson City, TN	**L** 5–6	Oliff (2–0)	**Sipe** (4–1)	Costarelli (3)	251	20–5	0–1
March 28	ESPN+	at ETSU		Thomas Stadium	**L** 3–4	Harpster (4–1)	**Velasquez** (1–1)	Scott (1)	634	20–6	0–2
March 29	ESPN+	at ETSU		Thomas Stadium	**W** 5–4	**Baker** (5–0)	Scott (2–1)	None	933	21–6	1–2
March 31	ESPN+	at William & Mary*		Plumeri Park; Williamsburg, VA	**W** 10–3	**Monroe** (3–0)	Weight (1–1)	None	691	22–6	—

April: 5–11 (Home: 4–6; Away: 1–5; Neutral: 0–0)
Date	TV	Opponent	Rank	Stadium	Score	Win	Loss	Save	Attendance	Overall	SoCon
April 2	ESPN+	Wofford		Gray–Minor Stadium	**L** 5–16^{7}	Condon (3–1)	**Velasquez** (1–2)	None	153	22–7	1–3
April 3	ESPN+	Wofford		Gray–Minor Stadium	**L** 2–9	Bouchard (5–2)	**Spiegel** (0–1)	None	161	22–8	1–4
April 4	ESPN+	Wofford		Gray–Minor Stadium	**W** 13–12^{10}	**Velasquez** (2–2)	Fitzpatrick (1–3)	None	209	23–8	2–4
April 7	ESPN+	George Washington*		Gray–Minor Stadium	**W** 10–7	**Tyndall** (2–1)	Murphy (0–2)	None	97	24–8	—
April 10	ESPN+	at Samford		Joe Lee Griffin Stadium; Birmingham, AL	**L** 4–10	Whitney (2–0)	**Spiegel** (0–2)	None	379	24–9	2–5
April 11	ESPN+	at Samford		Joe Lee Griffin Stadium	**L** 3–8	Blasche (2–5)	**Velasquez** (2–3)	None	391	24–10	2–6
April 12	ESPN+	at Samford		Joe Lee Griffin Stadium	**L** 3–5	Berry (3–1)	**Dhein** (2–3)	Tommasini (1)	123	24–11	2–7
April 14	ESPN+	at Norfolk State*		Marty L. Miller Field	**W** 8–4	**Monroe** (4–0)	Whitfield (0–2)	**Sipe** (2)	173	25–11	—
April 17	ESPN+	Western Carolina		Gray–Minor Stadium	**W** 10–8	**Spiegel** (1–2)	Burnette (2–5)	None	222	26–11	3–7
April 18	ESPN+	Western Carolina		Gray–Minor Stadium	**L** 5–18^{7}	Snyder (5–0)	**Tyndall** (2–2)	None	195	26–12	3–8
April 19	ESPN+	Western Carolina		Gray–Minor Stadium	**L** 3–4^{10}	Fordham (4–2)	**Sipe** (4–2)	Fuller (2)	187	26–13	3–9
April 21	ESPN+	at Longwood*		Bolding Stadium; Farmville, VA	**L** 4–10	Castrichini (2–2)	**Tyndall** (2–3)	None	183	26–14	—
April 24	ESPN+	at High Point*		George S. Erath Field; High Point, NC	**L** 5–7	Walton (5–2)	**Spiegel** (1–3)	Story (7)	248	26–15	—
April 25	ESPN+	at High Point*		George S. Erath Field	**L** 6–12	Brachbill (9–1)	**Jones** (1–1)	Story (8)	250	26–16	—
April 26	ESPN+	at High Point*		George S. Erath Field	**L** 2–5	Paul (4–1)	**Baker** (5–1)	None	275	26–17	—
April 28	ESPN+	Longwood*		Gray–Minor Stadium	**W** 3–0	**Sipe** (5–2)	Nash (2–2)	**Bassett** (1)	600	27–17	—

May: 1–6 (Home: 1–0; Away: 0–6; Neutral: 0–0)
Date	TV	Opponent	Rank	Stadium	Score	Win	Loss	Save	Attendance	Overall	SoCon
May 1	ESPN+	at UNCG		UNCG Baseball Stadium; Greensboro, NC	**L** 6–7	Chapman (3–6)	**Sipe** (5–3)	Horton (2)	350	27–18	3–10
May 2	ESPN+	at UNCG		UNCG Baseball Stadium	**L** 6–9	Dear (1–2)	**Baker** (5–2)	Horton (3)	450	27–19	3–11
May 3	ESPN+	at UNCG		UNCG Baseball Stadium	**L** 4–7	Shuey (2–5)	**Driscoll** (3–2)	Horton (4)	381	27–20	3–12
May 8	ESPN+	at Mercer		Claude Smith Field; Macon, GA	**L** 2–13^{(7)}	Lambert (5–0)	**Spiegel** (1–4)	None	875	27–21	3–13
May 9	ESPN+	at Mercer		Claude Smith Field	**L** 2–5	Hugas (9–2)	**Driscoll** (3–3)	None	545	27–22	3–14
May 10	ESPN+	at Mercer		Claude Smith Field	**L** 1–11^{(8)}	Ackerman (3–2)	**Jones** (1–2)	None	419	27–23	3–15
May 12	ESPN+	Norfolk State*		Gray–Minor Stadium	**W** 15–5	**Dhein** (3–3)	Harrison (0–2)	None	125	28–23	—
May 14	ESPN+	The Citadel		Gray–Minor Stadium							
May 15	ESPN+	The Citadel		Gray–Minor Stadium							
May 16	ESPN+	The Citadel		Gray–Minor Stadium							

Postseason: 0–0 (Home: 0–0; Away: 0–0; Neutral: 0–0)

SoCon tournament: 0–0 (Home: 0–0; Away: 0–0; Neutral: 0–0)
Date	TV	Opponent	Rank	Stadium	Score	Win	Loss	Save	Attendance	Overall	SCT Record
May 20–23		vs. TBD		Flour Field; Greenville, SC							

Legend: = Win = Loss = Canceled
Bold = VMI team member
Rankings are based on the team's current ranking in the D1Baseball poll.

Schedule Notes

== Rankings ==
Ranking movements Legend: ██ Increase in ranking ██ Decrease in ranking — = Not ranked RV = Received votes
	Week																		
Poll	Pre	1	2	3	4	5	6	7	8	9	10	11	12	13	14	15	16	17	Final
Coaches'	—	—*	RV	RV	—	—	—	—	—	—	—								
Baseball America	—	—	—	—	—	—	—	—	—	—	—								
NCBWA†	—	—	RV	RV	RV	—	—	—	—	—	—								
D1Baseball	—	—	—	—	—	—	—	—	—	—	—								
Perfect Game	—	—	—	—	—	—	—	—	—	—	—								

† NCBWA ranks 30 teams in their preseason poll, but only ranks 25 teams weekly during the season.
* A new poll was not released for this week, so for comparison purposes, the previous week's ranking is inserted in this week's slot.
