= 2026 Western Carolina Catamounts baseball team =

American college baseball season

2026 Western Carolina Catamounts baseball
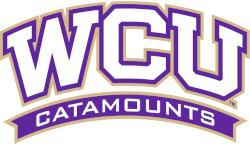
- Conference: Southern Conference
- Record: 36–23 (14–7 SoCon)
- Head coach: Alan Beck (4th season)
- Assistant coaches: Seth Graves (4th season); Nate Stocum
- Hitting coach: Jeff Korte (4th season)
- Pitching coach: Dusty White (3rd season)
- Home stadium: Hennon Stadium

2026 Southern Conference baseball standings
	Conf.				Overall
Team	W		L	PCT	W		L	PCT
Mercer ‍†‍‍	15	–	6	.714	44	–	15	.746
Western Carolina ‍‍‍	14	–	7	.667	36	–	23	.610
Samford ‍‍‍	12	–	9	.571	31	–	25	.554
Wofford ‍‍‍	12	–	9	.571	34	–	22	.607
The Citadel ‍‍‡‍^{y}	11	–	10	.524	36	–	26	.581
East Tennessee State ‍‍‍	10	–	11	.476	30	–	23	.566
UNC Greensboro ‍‍‍	7	–	14	.333	23	–	33	.411
VMI ‍‍‍	3	–	18	.143	28	–	27	.509
† – Conference champion ‡ – Tournament champion y – Invited to the NCAA tournament As of May 31, 2026; Rankings from D1Baseball

The 2026 Western Carolina Catamounts baseball team represents Western Carolina University during the 2026 NCAA Division I baseball season. The Catamounts play their home games at Ronnie G. Childress Field at Hennon Stadium. They are led by fourth-year head coach, Alan Beck.

== Preseason ==
=== Coaches poll ===
The coaches poll was released on February 5, 2026. WCU was selected to finish fifth in the conference.

SoCon coaches poll
Predicted finish	Team	Votes (1st place)
1	Samford	45 (4)
2	Mercer	44 (3)
3	ETSU	38 (1)
4	The Citadel	30
5	Western Carolina	24
6	UNCG	16
7	VMI	14
8	Wofford	13

=== Awards and honors ===
==== Preseason SoCon awards and honors ====
Preseason All-SoCon Team
Player	No.	Position	Class	Designation
Davis Wright	31	SP	Senior	First Team
Trent Turner	7	SS	Graduate	First Team
Trey Spees	6	DH	Sophomore	First Team
Owen Austin	33	RP	Senior	Second Team
Ryan White	12	RP	Senior	Second Team

== Personnel ==
=== Roster ===
2026 Western Carolina Catamounts baseball team
Players
Coaches

#	Pos.	Name	B/T	Height	Weight	Year	Home town
1	OF	Elijah Smith	R/R	5 ft 11 in (1.8 m)	185 lb (84 kg)	Jr	Warner Robins, GA
2	OF	Yates Sikes	L/L	5 ft 8 in (1.73 m)	175 lb (79 kg)	RS So	High Point, NC
3	INF	Jaylen Jones	R/R	5 ft 9 in (1.75 m)	180 lb (82 kg)	RS Fr	Loganville, GA
4	INF	Jackson Lyda	L/R	6 ft 2 in (1.88 m)	190 lb (86 kg)	So	Fletcher, NC
5	RHP	Mason Snyder	R/R	5 ft 8 in (1.73 m)	175 lb (79 kg)	Jr	Ocilla, GA
6	INF	Trey Spees	L/R	6 ft 0 in (1.83 m)	195 lb (88 kg)	So	Denver, NC
7	INF	Trent Turner	R/R	6 ft 0 in (1.83 m)	195 lb (88 kg)	Gr	Waynesville, NC
8	C	Cam Murray	R/R	6 ft 0 in (1.83 m)	205 lb (93 kg)	RS Sr	Fredericksburg, VA
9	RHP	Kaden Fuller	R/R	6 ft 1 in (1.85 m)	215 lb (98 kg)	RS So	King, NC
10	LHP	Evan Myers	L/L	6 ft 0 in (1.83 m)	175 lb (79 kg)	Fr	Denver, NC
11	UTL	Cole Jones	L/R	6 ft 2 in (1.88 m)	215 lb (98 kg)	RS Sr	Champaign, IL
12	LHP	Ryan White	L/L	5 ft 10 in (1.78 m)	190 lb (86 kg)	Sr	Randleman, NC
14	INF	Mason Holton	R/R	6 ft 3 in (1.91 m)	205 lb (93 kg)	Gr	Overland Park, KS
15	C	Noah Quarless	R/R	6 ft 2 in (1.88 m)	210 lb (95 kg)	RS So	Winston-Salem, NC
16	OF	Walker Fox	L/L	6 ft 3 in (1.91 m)	200 lb (91 kg)	So	Canton, NC
17	RHP	Shane Huntsberger	R/R	6 ft 0 in (1.83 m)	190 lb (86 kg)	RS Jr	Coral Springs, FL
18	INF	Carson Wallace	R/R	6 ft 0 in (1.83 m)	175 lb (79 kg)	Fr	Asheville, NC
19	UTL	Josh Ossiander	R/R	6 ft 2 in (1.88 m)	215 lb (98 kg)	Jr	Northampton, PA
20	LHP	Jacob Arnberger	L/L	5 ft 10 in (1.78 m)	205 lb (93 kg)	So	Atlanta, GA
21	RHP	Colton Starling	R/R	5 ft 11 in (1.8 m)	205 lb (93 kg)	RS So	Marshville, NC
22	RHP	Carter Burnette	R/R	6 ft 5 in (1.96 m)	240 lb (109 kg)	So	Asheville, NC
25	LHP	Scott Templeton	L/L	6 ft 3 in (1.91 m)	210 lb (95 kg)	Gr	Mt. Pleasant, SC
26	RHP	Davis Budd	R/R	6 ft 2 in (1.88 m)	210 lb (95 kg)	Jr	Acworth, GA
27	OF	Wyatt Stanley	L/R	6 ft 1 in (1.85 m)	215 lb (98 kg)	RS So	High Point, NC
28	RHP	James Fordham	R/R	5 ft 11 in (1.8 m)	195 lb (88 kg)	Jr	Chester, GA
29	C	Carlos Diaz	R/R	6 ft 1 in (1.85 m)	215 lb (98 kg)	Fr	Youngsville, NC
30	C	Turner Gross	R/R	6 ft 4 in (1.93 m)	220 lb (100 kg)	Fr	St. Petersburg, FL
31	LHP	Davis Wright	L/L	5 ft 11 in (1.8 m)	190 lb (86 kg)	Sr	Ridgeway, SC
32	RHP	Griffin Guinther	R/R	6 ft 1 in (1.85 m)	200 lb (91 kg)	Jr	Roswell, GA
33	LHP	Owen Austin	L/L	6 ft 1 in (1.85 m)	210 lb (95 kg)	Sr	Easley, SC
34	OF	Brody Raleigh	R/R	5 ft 10 in (1.78 m)	200 lb (91 kg)	Jr	Endwell, NY
35	RHP	Bryant Kimbrell	R/R	6 ft 2 in (1.88 m)	230 lb (104 kg)	So	West End, NC
36	INF	Marshall McGowan	R/R	6 ft 3 in (1.91 m)	230 lb (104 kg)	Fr	Forest City, NC
37	RHP	Bryce Davidson	R/R	6 ft 3 in (1.91 m)	220 lb (100 kg)	RS So	Fletcher, NC
39	OF	Dominic Robinson	R/R	6 ft 0 in (1.83 m)	180 lb (82 kg)	Fr	Denver, NC
40	RHP	Davis Jabaley	R/R	6 ft 0 in (1.83 m)	195 lb (88 kg)	Fr	Dunwoody, GA
41	LHP	Trey Wheeler	L/L	6 ft 0 in (1.83 m)	185 lb (84 kg)	RS So	Melbourne, FL
42	RHP	Ryan Perzanowski	R/R	6 ft 2 in (1.88 m)	205 lb (93 kg)	Fr	Fawn Grove, PA
43	RHP	Deegan Randall	R/R	6 ft 2 in (1.88 m)	210 lb (95 kg)	Fr	Candler, NC
44	OF	Caden Haywood	R/R	6 ft 1 in (1.85 m)	250 lb (113 kg)	RS Fr	Harrisburg, NC
46	RHP	Caleb Williams	R/R	6 ft 2 in (1.88 m)	210 lb (95 kg)	RS So	Bethlehem, NC
47	INF	Jackson Godfrey	L/R	6 ft 1 in (1.85 m)	220 lb (100 kg)	RS Fr	Greensboro, NC
48	RHP	John Lobs	R/R	6 ft 4 in (1.93 m)	215 lb (98 kg)	So	Winston-Salem, NC
50	RHP	Tyler Oaks	L/R	6 ft 3 in (1.91 m)	235 lb (107 kg)	Fr	Madisonville, TN
—	LHP	Gavin Maines (redshirt)	L/L	6 ft 1 in (1.85 m)	210 lb (95 kg)	So	Yadkinville, NC

Head coach

Alan Beck

Assistant coach(es)

Seth Graves
Nate Stocum
Jeff Korte
Dusty White

Legend

- (C) Team captain
- (S) Suspended
- (I) Ineligible
- Injured
- Current redshirt

Roster
Last update: April 23, 2026

== Game log ==
2026 Western Carolina Catamounts baseball game log
(Overall: 36–23; Conference: 14–7); (Home: 21–7; Away: 12–12; Neutral: 3–4)
Regular season (35–21)
February (7–3)
(Home: 6–1; Away: 0–1; Neutral: 1–1)

Date	Time (EST)	Opponent	Rank	TV	Venue	Score	Win	Loss	Save	Attendance	Overall record	SoCon record
February 13	4:05 p.m.	George Washington*		ESPN+	Hennon Stadium; Cullowhee, NC	**W** 7–5^{(10)}	**Austin** (1–0)	Bruno (0–1)	—	789	1–0	—
February 14	1:05 p.m.	George Washington*			Hennon Stadium	**W** 13–4	**Burnette** (1–0)	Cutler (0–1)	—	802	2–0	—
February 14	4:35 p.m.	George Washington*			Hennon Stadium	**W** 5–4	**Fordham** (1–0)	Harris (0–1)	—	598	3–0	—
February 17	3:00 p.m.	at USC Upstate*		ESPN+	Cleveland S. Harley Park; Spartanburg, SC	**L** 0–17	Kaplan (1–0)	**Huntsberger** (0–1)	Kirby (1)	215	3–1	—
February 20	4:05 p.m.	Bowling Green*		ESPN+	Hennon Stadium	**W** 4–3	**Snyder** (1–0)	Lotz (0–1)	**Austin** (1)	697	4–1	—
February 21	1:05 p.m.	Bowling Green*		ESPN+	Hennon Stadium	**L** 5–6	Kress (1–0)	**Budd** (0–1)	Kade (1)	728	4–2	—
February 21	4:35 p.m.	Bowling Green*		ESPN+	Hennon Stadium	**W** 5–0	**Myers** (1–0)	Heffernan (0–1)	—	719	5–2	—
February 24	4:05 p.m.	Akron*		ESPN+	Hennon Stadium	**W** 12–2^{(8)}	**Oaks** (1–0)	Beck (0–1)	—	329	6–2	—
Keith LeClair Classic
February 27	3:00 p.m.	vs. Troy*			Clark–LeClair Stadium; Greenville, NC	**W** 4–3	**Snyder** (2–0)	Gross (0–1)	**Austin** (2)	4,277	7–2	—
February 28	12:00 p.m.	vs. Rutgers*			Clark–LeClair Stadium	**L** 3–9	Konstantinovsk (2–0)	**Burnette** (1–1)	—	5,372	7–3	—

March (11–9)
(Home: 6–3; Away: 4–5; Neutral: 1–1)

Date	Time (EDT)	Opponent	Rank	TV	Venue	Score	Win	Loss	Save	Attendance	Overall record	SoCon record
Keith LeClair Classic
March 1	3:30 p.m.	at East Carolina*		ESPN+	Clark–LeClair Stadium	**W** 2–0	**Myers** (2–0)	Weber (0–1)	**Austin** (3)	5,411	8–3	—
March 4	3:00 p.m.	at No. 8 Georgia*		SECN+	Foley Field; Athens, GA	**W** 10–9	**Kimbrell** (1–0)	Ellisen (0–1)	—	1,155	9–3	—
March 6	12:00 p.m.	vs. Radford*			Hayes Stadium; Charlotte, NC	**L** 1–7	Quintana (3–0)	**Wright** (0–1)	—	189	9–4	—
March 7	12:30 p.m.	vs. Radford*			Hayes Stadium	**W** 10–0^{(7)}	**Snyder** (3–0)	Steinhaus (1–3)	—	354	10–4	—
March 7	4:00 p.m.	at Charlotte*		ESPN+	Hayes Stadium	**L** 0–4	Munn (3–0)	**Burnette** (1–2)	—	842	10–5	—
March 8	1:00 p.m.	at Charlotte*		ESPN+	Hayes Stadium	**L** 4–7	Carson (2–0)	**Myers** (2–1)	—	732	10–6	—
Old Mountain Jug Series
March 10	6:00 p.m.	at Appalachain State*		ESPN+	Jim and Bettie Smith Stadium; Boone, NC	**W** 13–3	**Kimbrell** (2–0)	Tibbett (0–2)	—	425	11–6	—
March 12	5:05 p.m.	Morehead State*		SECN+	Hennon Stadium	**L** 5–8	Wells (2–1)	**Fordham** (1–1)	—	326	11–7	—
March 13	5:05 p.m.	Morehead State*		ESPN+	Hennon Stadium	**W** 11–0^{(7)}	**Burnette** (2–2)	Miller (0–1)	—	452	12–7	—
March 14	2:05 p.m.	Morehead State*		ESPN+	Hennon Stadium	**W** 13–4	**Wright** (1–1)	Hawks (1–2)	—	621	13–7	—
March 15	1:05 p.m.	Morehead State*		ESPN+	Hennon Stadium	**W** 8–7	**Kimbrell** (3–0)	Hayes (1–1)	—	586	14–7	—
March 18	3:05 p.m.	Gardner–Webb*			Hennon Stadium	**W** 8–4	**Fordham** (2–1)	Gentile (0–1)	—	321	15–7	—
March 20	5:05 p.m.	Samford		ESPN+	Hennon Stadium	**L** 0–11^{(7)}	Lee (1–0)	**Burnette** (2–3)	—	786	15–8	0–1
March 21	2:00 p.m.	Samford			Hennon Stadium	**W** 11–9	**Wright** (2–1)	Blasche (0–5)	—	1,067	16–8	1–1
March 22	1:05 p.m.	Samford		ESPN+	Hennon Stadium	**W** 10–9	**Kimbrell** (4–0)	Spurrier (1–2)	**Austin** (4)	801	17–8	2–1
Mountain Rivalry
March 24	4:00 p.m.	at UNC Asheville*		ESPN+	Greenwood Field; Asheville, NC	**L** 4–8	Hall (2–0)	**Oaks** (1–1)	—	475	17–9	—
March 27	6:00 p.m.	at The Citadel		ESPN+	Joseph P. Riley Jr. Park; Charleston, SC	**L** 3–4	Buffkin (2–0)	**Fordham** (2–2)	—	623	17–10	2–2
March 28	2:00 p.m.	at The Citadel		SECN+	Joseph P. Riley Jr. Park	**L** 9–13	Ballard (3–1)	**Budd** (1–1)	—	1,135	17–11	2–3
March 29	1:00 p.m.	at The Citadel		SECN+	Joseph P. Riley Jr. Park	**W** 16–3^{(7)}	**Myers** (3–1)	Deacon (0–1)	—	711	18–11	3–3
March 31	5:05 p.m.	Presbyterian*		ESPN+	Hennon Stadium	**L** 5–6	Meredith (2–1)	**Oaks** (1–2)	Hampton (1)	126	18–12	—

April (11–4)
(Home; 6–2; Away: 5–2)

Date	Time (EDT)	Opponent	Rank	TV	Venue	Score	Win	Loss	Save	Attendance	Overall record	SoCon record
April 2	6:00 p.m.	at Winthrop*		ESPN+	The Winthrop Ballpark; Rock Hill, SC	**W** 15–7	**Budd** (1–2)	Gilley (4–3)	**Snyder** (1)	482	19–12	—
April 3	6:05 p.m.	at Winthrop*		ESPN+	The Winthrop Ballpark	**L** 4–6	McNeely (5–0)	**Burnette** (2–4)	—	485	19–13	—
April 4	2:05 p.m.	at Winthrop*			The Winthrop Ballpark	**W** 7–6	**Lobs** (1–0)	Guzman (0–2)	**Synder** (2)	583	20–13	—
April 7	5:00 p.m.	USC Upstate*			Hennon Stadium	**L** 11–18	Land (1–1)	**Oaks** (1–3)	—	134	20–14	—
April 10	5:00 p.m.	Mercer		ESPN+	Hennon Stadium	**W** 10–6	**Snyder** (4–0)	Ackerman (2–2)	—	752	21–14	4–3
April 11	3:00 p.m.	Mercer		ESPN+	Hennon Stadium	**W** 17–9	**Budd** (2–2)	Hugas (6–2)	**Lobs** (2)	1,216	22–14	5–3
April 12	1:00 p.m.	Mercer		ESPN+	Hennon Stadium	**W** 5–4	**Fordham** (3–2)	Johnson (2–2)	**Fuller** (1)	623	23–14	6–3
Old Mountain Jug Series
April 14	5:00 p.m.	Appalachian State*		ESPN+	Hennon Stadium	**W** 14–4^{(7)}	**Austin** (2–0)	Barozzino (0–3)	—	811	24–14	—
April 17	6:00 p.m.	at VMI		ESPN+	Gray–Minor Stadium; Lexington, VA	**L** 8–10	Spiegel (1–2)	**Burnette** (2–5)	—	222	24–15	6–4
April 18	2:00 p.m.	at VMI		ESPN+	Gray–Minor Stadium	**W** 18–5^{(7)}	**Synder** (5–0)	Tyndall (2–2)	—	195	25–15	7–4
April 19	1:00 p.m.	at VMI		ESPN+	Gray–Minor Stadium	**W** 4–3^{(10)}	**Fordham** (4–2)	Sipe (4–2)	**Fuller** (2)	187	26–15	8–4
April 21	6:00 p.m.	at Gardner–Webb*		SECN	John Henry Moss Stadium; Boiling Springs, NC	**W** 11–1^{(8)}	**Austin** (3–0)	Hausner (2–2)	—	79	27–15	—
April 24	3:00 p.m.	ETSU			Hennon Stadium	**W** 14–10	**Snyder** (6–0)	Rolison (3–1)	—	227	28–15	9–4
April 24	6:00 p.m.	ETSU			Hennon Stadium	**L** 3–4	Harpster (6–1)	**Fordham** (4–3)	Curless (3)	782	28–16	9–5
April 26	1:00 p.m.	ETSU		ESPN+	Hennon Stadium	**W** 13–2^{(7)}	**Myers** (4–1)	Jones (3–2)	—	619	29–16	10–5

May (6–5)
(Home; 3–1; Away: 3–4)

Date	Time (EDT)	Opponent	Rank	TV	Venue	Score	Win	Loss	Save	Attendance	Overall record	SoCon record
May 1	5:30 p.m.	at Wofford			Russell C. King Field; Spartanburg, SC	**L** 1–6	Bouchard (8–2)	**Burnette** (2–6)	—	387	29–17	10–6
May 2	2:00 p.m.	at Wofford		ESPN+	Russell C. King Field	**W** 3–2	**Snyder** (7–0)	Little (3–2)	—	479	30–17	11–6
May 3	1:00 p.m.	at Wofford		ESPN+	Russell C. King Field	**W** 7–5	**Myers** (5–1)	Laughlin (1–1)	**Lobs** (2)	462	31–17	12–6
Mountain Rivalry
May 5	5:00 p.m.	UNC Asheville*		WYCW	Hennon Stadium	**W** 4–1	**Wright** (3–1)	Boesen (1–3)	**Arnberger** (1)	552	32–17	—
May 8	6:00 p.m.	at Wake Forest*		ACCNX	David F. Couch Ballpark; Winston-Salem, NC	**L** 1–6	Levonas (9–3)	**Burnette** (2–7)	Johnston (1)	2,370	32–18	—
May 9	6:00 p.m.	at Wake Forest*		ACCNX	David F. Couch Ballpark	**L** 2–14^{(7)}	Dressler (7–1)	**Fordham** (4–4)	—	2,614	32–19	—
May 10	1:00 p.m.	at Wake Forest*		ACCNX	David F. Couch Ballpark	**L** 5–9	Harsch (3–2)	**Snyder** (7–1)	—	2,476	32–20	—
May 12	6:00 p.m.	at Presbyterian*			The Plex; Clinton, SC	**W** 14–3^{(7)}	**Kimbrell** (5–0)	Vann (0–2)	—	193	33–20	—
May 14	5:00 p.m.	UNCG		ESPN+	Hennon Stadium	**L** 1–2	Chapman (4–6)	**Burnette** (2–8)	Horton (6)	532	33–21	12–7
May 15	5:00 p.m.	UNCG		ESPN+	Hennon Stadium	**W** 4–1	**Fordham** (5–4)	Dear (2–3)	—	774	34–21	13–7
May 16	2:00 p.m.	UNCG		ESPN+	Hennon Stadium	**W** 7–2	**Myers** (6–1)	Shuey (2–7)	—	828	35–21	14–7

Postseason (1–2)
SoCon tournament (1–2)

Date	Time (EDT)	Opponent	Rank	TV	Venue	Score	Win	Loss	Save	Attendance	Overall record	Tournament record
May 21	1:00 p.m.	vs. (3) Samford	(2)	ESPN+	Fluor Field; Greenville, SC	**L** 5–9	Whitney (3–0)	**Burnette** (2–9)	—	572	35–22	0–1
May 21	8:40 p.m.	vs. (7) UNC Greensboro	(2)	ESPN+	Fluor Field	**W** 4–3	**Wright** (4–1)	Shuey (2–8)	—	315	36–22	1–1
May 22	7:15 p.m.	vs. (3) Samford	(2)	ESPN+	Fluor Field	**L** 1–5	Spurrier (4–3)	**Snyder** (7–2)	—	584	36–23	1–2

"#" represents ranking. All rankings from D1Baseball Poll on the date of the contest.
"()" represents postseason seeding in the SoCon Tournament or NCAA Regional, respectively.
= Win, = Loss, = Canceled/Postponed
Bold = **Western Carolina Catamounts team member**
* = Non-Conference Game
Schedule Source:

Schedule Notes:

== Rankings ==
Ranking movements Legend: — = Not ranked
	Week																
Poll	Pre	1	2	3	4	5	6	7	8	9	10	11	12	13	14	15	Final
Coaches'	—	—*	—	—	—	—	—	—	—	—	—	—	—	—	—	—	
Baseball America	—	—	—	—	—	—	—	—	—	—	—	—	—	—	—	—	
NCBWA†	—	—	—	—	—	—	—	—	—	—	—	—	—	—	—	—	
D1Baseball	—	—	—	—	—	—	—	—	—	—	—	—	—	—	—	—	
Perfect Game	—	—	—	—	—	—	—	—	—	—	—	—	—	—	—	—	

† NCBWA ranks 30 teams in their preseason poll, but only ranks 25 teams weekly during the season.
* A new poll was not released for this week, so for comparison purposes, the previous week's ranking is inserted in this week's slot.
