= 2026 Southern Conference baseball season =

- League: Southern Conference
- Sport: Baseball
- Duration: February 13, 2026 - June 22, 2026
- Games: 21 (conference)
- Teams: 8
- TV partner: ESPN+

Regular Season
- Season champions: Mercer Bears
- Season MVP: Player: Chris Katz (MER); Pitcher: Alec Bouchard (WOF)

Conference Tournament
- Champions: The Citadel
- Runners-up: Samford
- Finals MVP: Michael Gibson (CIT)

Seasons
- ← 2025 2027 →

2026 Southern Conference baseball standings
	Conf.				Overall
Team	W		L	PCT	W		L	PCT
Mercer ‍†‍‍	15	–	6	.714	44	–	15	.746
Western Carolina ‍‍‍	14	–	7	.667	36	–	23	.610
Samford ‍‍‍	12	–	9	.571	31	–	25	.554
Wofford ‍‍‍	12	–	9	.571	34	–	22	.607
The Citadel ‍‍‡‍^{y}	11	–	10	.524	35	–	24	.593
East Tennessee State ‍‍‍	10	–	11	.476	30	–	23	.566
UNC Greensboro ‍‍‍	7	–	14	.333	23	–	33	.411
VMI ‍‍‍	3	–	18	.143	28	–	27	.509
† – Conference champion ‡ – Tournament champion y – Invited to the NCAA tournament As of May 23, 2026; Rankings from D1Baseball

The 2026 Southern Conference baseball season is the baseball season for the Southern Conference as part of the 2026 NCAA Division I baseball season. Samford was predicted to win the conference in the preseason poll. The conference tournament was played from May 20 to May 23 at Fluor Field at the West End in Greenville, South Carolina.

The Mercer Bears won the regular season SoCon championship and obtained the #1 seed in the conference tournament. The Citadel Bulldogs won the conference tournament, thereby receiving an automatic bid to the 2026 NCAA Division I baseball tournament. Consequently, the Bears became the highest-ranked team in terms of the NCAA's rating percentage index (RPI) metric (finishing 28th) to be left out of the NCAA tournament since the super-regional format was adopted in 1999.

== Regular season ==
The Southern Conference began conference play on March 20. Conference play ended on May 16. Each team played 21 conference games, with three games against each conference opponent home or away.

In regular season play, Mercer won the outright SoCon regular season title by one game. The eight SoCon baseball coaches voted Chris Katz of Mercer as 2026 SoCon Baseball Player of the Year and Alec Bouchard of Wofford as 2026 SoCon Baseball Pitcher of the Year. Garrett Lambert of Mercer was selected as 2026 SoCon Baseball Freshman of the Year, and Craig Gibson of Mercer was voted 2026 SoCon Baseball Coach of the Year. Aryan Patel of The Citadel was voted as the 2026 SoCon Baseball Golden Glove recipient, which was given to the 2026 SoCon Baseball Defensive Player of the Year.

=== Conference Game Results and Standings ===
Conference game results and standings are presented below, and include all regular season games.

Pos	Team	Pld	CW	CL	CPCT	GB	W	L	PCT	Qualification
1	Mercer (C)	56	15	6	.714	—	43	13	.768	Qualification for the third round of conference tournament
2	Western Carolina	56	14	7	.667	1	35	21	.625	Qualification for the third round of conference tournament
3	Samford	52	12	9	.571 (Note: Samford won season series 2-1 over Wofford)	3	28	24	.538	Qualification for the second round of conference tournament
4	Wofford	54	12	9	.571	3	34	20	.630	Qualification for the second round of conference tournament
5	The Citadel	54	11	10	.524	4	30	24	.556	Qualification for the first round of conference tournament
6	East Tennessee State	52	10	11	.476	5	30	22	.577	Qualification for the first round of conference tournament
7	UNC Greensboro	53	7	14	.333	8	22	31	.415	Qualification for the first round of conference tournament
8	VMI	54	3	18	.143	12	28	26	.519	Qualification for the first round of conference tournament

Source: Southern Conference
(C) Regular season champion(s)
Notes:

Home \ Away	CIT	ETSU	MER	SAM	UNCG	VMI	WCU	WOF
The Citadel				2–1	2–1		2–1	
East Tennessee State	2–1		0–3			2–1		
Mercer	2–1					3–0		3–0
Samford		1–2	1–2			3–0		2–1
UNC Greensboro		1–2	1–2	0–3		3–0		
VMI	0–3						1–2	1–2
Western Carolina		2–1	3–0	2–1	2–1			
Wofford	3–0	2–1			3–0		1–2	

Source: Southern Conference
Legend: Blue = home team win; Red = away team win.

=== Regular Season Honors ===
Southern Conference Baseball awards for regular-season performance were unveiled on May 19, 2026. These awards included awards for player, pitcher, freshman, coach, and defensive players of the year, as well as all-conference first, second, defensive, and freshman teams.

==== Individual Honors ====
- Player of the Year: Chris Katz (MER)
- Pitcher of the Year: Alec Bouchard (WOF)
- Freshman of the Year: Garrett Lambert (MER)
- Coach of the Year: Craig Gibson (MER)
- Golden Glove Recipient: Aryan Patel (CIT)

==== All-Southern Conference Teams ====
Position	All SoCon First Team	All SoCon Second Team
SP	Alec Bouchard (WOF)	Michael Harpster (ETSU)
SP	Garrett Lambert (MER)	Andrew Buffkin (CIT)
SP	Will Holmes (CIT)	Cullen Condon (WOF)
RP	Mason Snyder (WCU)	Michael Gibson (CIT)
RP	Jess Ackerman (MER)	Andrew Garnett (MER)
RP	Zak Spurrier (SAM)	Zane Davis (CIT)
C	Cade Carr (SAM)	Cole Raile (VMI); Noah Quarless (WCU)
1B	Grayson Fitzwater (VMI); Tristan Curless (ETSU)	Michael Gibson (CIT)
2B	Trent Turner (WCU))	Ian Guanzon (ETSU)
SS	Titan Kamaka (MER)	Henry Ferguson (ETSU)
3B	Brant Baughcum (MER)	Jacob Budzik (UNCG)
OF	Chris Katz (MER)	Ben Timblin (WOF)
OF	Eli Stephens (MER)	Jamie Palmese (ETSU)
OF	Jake Souders (SAM)	Luke Boykin (SAM)
DH	Braydon Kersey (MER)	Nate Conner (ETSU)

All SoCon Defensive Team	All SoCon Freshman Team
Aryan Patel (CIT)	Garrett Lambert (MER)
Grayson Fitzwater (VMI)	Jaylen Jones (WCU))
Owen Prince (VMI)	Brady Gold (WOF)
Henry Ferguson (ETSU)	Jayden Williams (CIT)
Jayden Williams (CIT)	Evan Myers (WCU))
Parker McDonald (SAM)	Eddie Marshall (SAM)
Jamie Palmese (ETSU)	Cooper Jones (ETSU)
Cade Carr (SAM)	Tanner Berry (UNCG)
Jeff Ince (SAM)	Mason Ault (ETSU)
Niko Brini (WOF)	Ethan Buffone (MER)
Trent Turner (WCU))	Ayden West (UNCG)
Gus Gandy (SAM)	Buddy Baker (VMI)

== Tournament ==
2026 Southern Conference baseball tournament
- Teams: 8
- Format: Single elimination play-in round, then two-bracket double-elimination tournament, followed by winner-take-all championship game
- Finals site: Fluor Field at the West End; Greenville, SC
- Champions: The Citadel (9th title)
- Winning coach: Russell Triplett (1st title)
- MVP: Michael Gibson (CIT)
- Television: ESPN+

The 2026 Southern Conference baseball tournament was held from May 20 through May 23 at Fluor Field at the West End in Greenville, South Carolina. The winner of the conference tournament received an automatic bid to the 2026 NCAA Division I baseball tournament.

Beginning with the 2026 edition of the tournament, two separate brackets were maintained until the championship game, consisting of four teams each. All eight SoCon baseball teams participated in the tournament and were placed in a bracket and seeded based on regular season conference record. The bottom four seeds played in the single-elimination first round to begin the tournament. The two first round winners then joined the top four seeds in two separate double-elimination brackets, with the top two seeds receiving byes into the third round, and the third and fourth placed teams playing the first round winners in the second round. Once one team advanced from each bracket, they played each other in a winner-take-all championship game. The East Tennessee State Buccaneers were defending champions, having won the 2025 edition of the tournament.

In the first round, the fifth-seeded The Citadel Bulldogs and seventh-seeded UNC Greensboro Spartans defeated the eighth-seeded VMI Keydets and sixth-seeded East Tennessee State Buccaneers, respectively, to advance to the second round. The Keydets and Buccaneers were thereby eliminated from the conference tournament.

In the top half of the bracket, The Citadel upset the fourth-seeded Wofford Terriers in the second round, advancing to the third round of the tournament. The Citadel then defeated the top-seeded Mercer Bears to advance to the tournament semifinals. This resulted in the Terriers and Bears playing in an elimination game, with the Bears winning that game by one run. This set up a rematch between Mercer and The Citadel in the semifinals, with the Bulldogs once again victorious in run-rule fashion, giving The Citadel a berth in the championship game.

On the other side of the bracket, the Spartans were defeated by the third-seeded Samford Bulldogs. Samford then upset the second-seeded Western Carolina Catamounts, setting up an elimination game between the Catamounts and Spartans. This game was won by Western Carolina, setting up a rematch between Samford and Western Carolina in the tournament semifinals. Samford defeated the Catamounts in extra innings, setting up a championship match between both of the SoCon's Bulldogs.

New to this year's tournament, the championship game was winner-take-all for the automatic bid to the 2026 NCAA tournament. The Citadel won the championship match, outscoring Samford by two runs, to give The Citadel Bulldogs their first NCAA tournament berth since their 2010 season.

Michael Gibson of The Citadel received the Walt Nadzak Award (named after Walt Nadzak) for being voted as the tournament's most outstanding player.

=== Seeding ===
Teams were seeded based on conference record, with one two-way tie being broken by head-to-head record among the two teams. No ties involved three or more teams during the 2026 regular season.

Pos	Team	Pld	CW	CL	CPCT	GB	W	L	PCT	Qualification
1	Mercer (C)	56	15	6	.714	—	43	13	.768	Not invited to NCAA tournament
2	Western Carolina	56	14	7	.667	1	35	21	.625	Not invited to NCAA tournament
3	Samford	52	12	9	.571 (Note: Samford won season series 2-1 over Wofford)	3	28	24	.538	Not invited to NCAA tournament
4	Wofford	54	12	9	.571	3	34	20	.630	Not invited to NCAA tournament
5	The Citadel (T)	54	11	10	.524	4	30	24	.556	Awarded automatic bid to NCAA tournament
6	East Tennessee State	52	10	11	.476	5	30	22	.577	Not invited to NCAA tournament
7	UNC Greensboro	53	7	14	.333	8	22	31	.415	Not invited to NCAA tournament
8	VMI	54	3	18	.143	12	28	26	.519	Not invited to NCAA tournament

Updated to match(es) played on May 23, 2026. Source: Southern Conference
(C) Regular season champion(s); (T) Conference tournament champion

=== Bracket ===
First Round; Wednesday, May 20
Game 1
5	The Citadel	21^{(8)}
8	VMI	11
Game 2
6	East Tennessee State	5
7	UNC Greensboro	6

Second Round; Wednesday, May 20
Game 3
5	The Citadel	13
4	Wofford	7
Game 4
7	UNC Greensboro	1
3	Samford	13^{(7)}

Third Round; Thursday, May 21
Game 5
5	The Citadel	9
1	Mercer	2
Game 7
1	Mercer	9
4	Wofford	8
Game 6
3	Samford	9
2	Western Carolina	5
Game 8
2	Western Carolina	4
7	UNC Greensboro	3

Semifinal Round; Friday, May 22
Games 9 & 11
5	The Citadel	14^{(7)}	–
1	Mercer	4	–
Games 10 & 12
3	Samford	5^{(13)}	–
2	Western Carolina	1	–

Championship; Saturday, May 23
Game 13
5	The Citadel	3
3	Samford	1

Game times are in EDT.
All games televised on ESPN+.
Rankings denote tournament seed.
Superscripted number next to scores denote games that use extra innings or the run rule.
Source: Southern Conference

=== Schedule ===
Game	Time	Matchup	Score	Reference
Day 1 (Wednesday, May 20)
1	9:00 a.m.	No. 5 The Citadel vs. No. 8 VMI	21–11^{(8)}	
2	1:30 p.m.	No. 6 East Tennessee State vs. No. 7 UNC Greensboro	5–6	
3	5:15 p.m.	No. 5 The Citadel vs. No. 4 Wofford	13–7	
4	9:25 p.m.	No. 7 UNC Greensboro vs. No. 3 Samford	1–13^{(7)}	
Day 2 (Thursday, May 21)
5	9:00 a.m.	No. 5 The Citadel vs. No. 1 Mercer	9–2	
6	12:55 p.m.	No. 3 Samford vs. No. 2 Western Carolina	9–5	
7	4:50 p.m.	No. 1 Mercer vs. No. 4 Wofford	9–8	
8	8:40 p.m.	No. 2 Western Carolina vs. No. 7 UNC Greensboro	4–3	
Day 3 (Friday, May 22)
9	9:00 a.m.	No. 5 The Citadel vs. No. 1 Mercer	14–4^{(7)}	
10	12:30 p.m.	No. 3 Samford vs. No. 2 Western Carolina	5–1^{(13)}	
11	Game skipped due to result of Game 9			
12	Game skipped due to result of Game 10			
Day 4 (Saturday, May 23)
13	7:00 p.m.	No. 5 The Citadel vs. No. 3 Samford	3–1	
Game times are in EDT. All games televised on ESPN+. Rankings denote tournament seed. Superscripted number next to scores denote games that use extra innings or the run rule. Source: Southern Conference

=== Tournament Honors ===
The Southern Conference announced tournament honors on May 23, 2026. These awards included the Walt Nadzak Award, named after Walt Nadzak, for the tournament's most outstanding player, and the 2026 All-Tournament Team. The Walt Nadzak Award was won by Michael Gibson of The Citadel.

==== All-Tournament Team ====
Position	Player
SP	Will Holmes (CIT)
SP	Garrett Lambert (MER)
SP	Mason Blasche (SAM)
RP	Cannon Lee (UNCG)
C	Phillips Daniels (CIT)
1B	Zach Hunt (CIT)
2B	Jeffrey Ince (SAM)
SS	Lane Tobin (CIT); Gus Gandy (SAM)
3B	Brant Baughcum (MER)
OF	Chris Katz (MER)
OF	Luke Boykin (SAM)
OF	Christian Stratis (CIT)
DH	Michael Gibson (CIT)

== Conference leaders ==
Hitting leaders
Stat	Player	Total
AVG	Michael Gibson (CIT)	.394
OPS	Chris Katz (MER)	1.301
HR	Chris Katz (MER))	23
RBI	Chris Katz (MER)	74
R	Chris Katz (MER)	82
H	Chris Katz (MER)	85
SB	Owen Prince (VMI)	29

Pitching leaders
Stat	Player	Total
W	Alec Bouchard (WOF); Miguel Hugas (MER)	9
L	Carter Burnette (WCU)	9
ERA	Andrew Buffkin (CIT)	2.62
K	Will Holmes (CIT)	112
IP	Will Holmes (CIT)	88 1/3
SV	Michael Gibson (CIT)	10
WHIP	Alec Bouchard (WOF); Hunter Sipe (VMI)	1.15

Updated to games played as of May 23, 2026. Includes all regular season conference and non-conference games, as well as conference tournament games.
Source: Southern Conference
Note: AVG, OPS, ERA, and WHIP leaders must qualify for their respective leaderboards per the SoCon Baseball 2026 Statistics webpage.

== See also ==
- 2026 in baseball
