= Tony David (baseball) =

American college baseball coach

Current position
- Title: Head coach
- Team: Samford
- Conference: Southern Conference
- Record: 131–103 (.560)

Biographical details
- Education: University of South Alabama

Playing career
- 1994–1995: South Alabama

Coaching career (HC unless noted)
- 1998–2003: Bayside (AL) Academy
- 2004: South Alabama (Assistant)
- 2005: Samford (Assistant/Recruiting Coord.)
- 2006–2017: Samford (Associate HC/Recruiting Coord.)
- 2018–2021: Samford (Associate HC)
- 2022–present: Samford

Head coaching record
- Overall: 131–103–0 (.560)
- Tournaments: SoCon 7–5 NCAA 1–2

Accomplishments and honors

Championships
- SoCon Regular season (2023) SoCon Tournament (2023)

Awards
- SoCon Coach of the Year (2023)

Tony David is an American college baseball coach, head coach of the NCAA Division I Southern Conference's Samford Bulldogs. He was the associate head coach and recruiting coordinator at Samford from 2006 to 2021. Prior to Samford, David was an assistant coach at South Alabama in 2004, where he played college baseball from 1994-1995.

== Head coaching record ==
Record table
Season	Team	Overall	Conference	Standing	Postseason
Samford Bulldogs (Southern Conference) (2022–present)
2022	Samford	28–29	12–9	T-2nd	Southern tournament
2023	Samford	37–25	15–6	1st	NCAA Regional
2024	Samford	36–22	14–7	2nd	SoCon tournament
2025	Samford	30–27	13–8	2nd	SoCon tournament
Samford:		131–103	54–30		
Total:		131–103			
National champion Postseason invitational champion Conference regular season champion Conference regular season and conference tournament champion Division regular season champion Division regular season and conference tournament champion Conference tournament champion
