= Joe Pennucci =

American baseball coach (born 1977/78)

Current position
- Title: Head coach
- Team: East Tennessee State
- Conference: Southern
- Record: 231–161

Biographical details
- Born: 1977 or 1978 (age 48–49)
- Education: University of Northern Colorado

Playing career
- 1996: Garden City Community College
- 1997–1999: Dana College
- Position: Catcher

Coaching career (HC unless noted)
- 2001–2004: Loveland (CO) (asst.)
- 2005–2006: Dominican College (NY) (asst.)
- 2007–2017: Stony Brook (asst.)
- 2018–present: East Tennessee State

Head coaching record
- Overall: 231–161
- Tournaments: Southern: 9–8; NCAA: 0–2

Accomplishments and honors

Championships
- SoCon (2025); SoCon tournament (2025)

Awards
- SoCon Coach of the Year (2025)

Joseph Pennucci (born 1977 or 1978) is an American college baseball coach and former catcher. He is the head baseball coach at East Tennessee State University. Pennucci played college baseball at Garden City Community College and Dana College.

== Playing career ==
Pennucci attended Loveland High School in Loveland, Colorado. Pennucci played for the school's varsity baseball team for three years. Pennucci then enrolled at Garden City Community College, to play college baseball for the Broncbusters team. After a season at Garden City, Pennucci transferred to Dana College to finish his career. He was named All-Conference one time.

== Coaching career ==
Pennucci was named an assistant coach at Loveland High School while he was finishing up his degree at the University of Northern Colorado. Loveland won a state title during his tenure as an assistant.

In 2005, Pennucci took an assistant coaching position with Dominican College. He spent two seasons there as the associate head coach and recruiting coordinator.

In the fall of 2006, Pennucci was named an assistant coach for the Stony Brook Seawolves baseball program.

Pennucci help the Seawolves to the 2012 College World Series. Coming off the World Series run, Pennucci was promoted to associate head coach of the Seawolves.

On July 10, 2017, Pennucci was named the head coach at East Tennessee State University.

== Head coaching record ==
Record table
Season	Team	Overall	Conference	Standing	Postseason
East Tennessee State Buccaneers (Southern Conference) (2018–present)
2018	East Tennessee State	28–25	11–13	6th	Southern Tournament
2019	East Tennessee State	34–21	11–12	6th	Southern Tournament
2020	East Tennessee State	12–3	0–0		Season canceled due to COVID-19
2021	East Tennessee State	24–25	13–16	2nd (Blue)	
2022	East Tennessee State	30–21	11–10	5th	
2023	East Tennessee State	26–29	10–11	4th	Southern Tournament
2024	East Tennessee State	36–20	13–8	3rd	SoCon tournament
2025	East Tennessee State	41–17	14–7	1st	NCAA Regional
East Tennessee State:		231–161	83–77		
Total:		231–161			
National champion Postseason invitational champion Conference regular season champion Conference regular season and conference tournament champion Division regular season champion Division regular season and conference tournament champion Conference tournament champion

== See also ==
- List of current NCAA Division I baseball coaches
