= Russell C. King Field =

College baseball stadium in South Carolina, U.S.

- King Field
- Interactive map of Russell C. King Field
- Location: 429 North Church Street, Spartanburg, South Carolina, United States
- Coordinates: 34.959171°N 81.93139°W
- Owner: Wofford College
- Operator: Wofford College
- Capacity: 2,500 (833 permanent seats)
- Surface: Natural grass
- Field size: 325 ft. (LF), 375 ft. (LCF), 390 ft. (CF), 375 ft. (RCF), 325 ft. (RF)

Construction
- Opened: 2004
- Cost: $1.8 million

Tenant
- Wofford Terriers baseball (SoCon) (2004–present)

Russell C. King Field is a baseball venue located in Spartanburg, South Carolina, United States. It is home to the Wofford Terriers college baseball team of the Division I Southern Conference. It has a capacity of 2,500 spectators.

Of the 2,500 spectator capacity, 833 is made up of permanent, chair-backed seating. The remainder consists of berm-style seating down either foul line. The field also features stadium lighting.

== Naming ==
The field is named for Russell C. King, Wofford Class of 1956. King played baseball during his time at the college. His donation played a major role in the park's being built. Prior to the construction of King Field, the Terriers had played at Duncan Park since beginning Division I play in 1996.

== See also ==
- List of NCAA Division I baseball venues
