= Thomas Stadium =

College baseball stadium in Tennessee, U.S.

- "The Thom"
- Interactive map of Thomas Stadium
- Location: State of Franklin Road and University Parkway, Johnson City, Tennessee, United States
- Coordinates: 36.310024°N 82.364218°W
- Owner: East Tennessee State University
- Operator: East Tennessee State University
- Capacity: 1,000
- Executive suites: Two
- Surface: AstroTurf
- Scoreboard: Lighthouse LED videoboard by TS Sports
- Record attendance: 1,752 (4/9/2013 vs. Tennessee)
- Field size: Left field: 325 feet (99 m); Left center field: 370 feet (110 m); Center field: 400 feet (120 m); Right center field: 370 feet (110 m); Right field: 325 feet (99 m)

Construction
- Built: 2011-2012
- Opened: Fri., February 17, 2012 (playing field); Fri., February 15, 2013 (stadium)
- Cost: $3.5 million
- Architect: Ken Ross Architects

Tenant
- East Tennessee State Buccaneers baseball (SoCon) (2012–present)

Thomas Stadium is a baseball venue in Johnson City, Tennessee, United States. It is home to the East Tennessee State Buccaneers baseball team of the NCAA Division I Southern Conference. Opened in 2012, the facility has a listed capacity of 1,000 spectators. Features of the stadium include an LED video board, a FieldTurf playing surface, stadium lighting, berm seating, concessions, and restrooms. The stadium replaced Howard Johnson Field as the home of East Tennessee State's baseball program.

The playing field at Thomas Stadium opened on February 17, 2012, when East Tennessee State defeated Eastern Kentucky 8–3 in front of 327 spectators. The stadium itself opened on February 15, 2013 with a 6–4 loss to Penn State with 910 in attendance. The largest crowd to fill the stadium occurred on April 9, 2013, when 1,752 fans attended the Bucs' game versus Tennessee.

In 2025, the field is scheduled to be replaced with Diamond Series AstroTurf that was previously used at Bristol Motor Speedway during the MLB Speedway Classic.

== See also ==
- List of NCAA Division I baseball venues
