= Samford Bulldogs baseball =

Samford Bulldogs
- 2026 Samford Bulldogs baseball team
- University: Samford University
- Head coach: Tony David (5th season)
- Conference: Southern
- Location: Homewood, Alabama
- Home stadium: Joe Lee Griffin Stadium (capacity: 1,000)
- Nickname: Bulldogs
- Colors: Blue and red

NCAA tournament appearances
- 2012, 2018, 2021, 2023

Conference tournament champions
- 2012, 2018, 2021, 2023

Conference regular season champions
- 2023

For information on all Samford University sports, see Samford Bulldogs

The Samford Bulldogs baseball team is a varsity intercollegiate athletic team of Samford University in Homewood, Alabama, United States. The team is a member of the Southern Conference, which is part of the National Collegiate Athletic Association's Division I. The team plays its home games at Joe Lee Griffin Stadium in Homewood, Alabama. The Bulldogs are coached by Tony David.

== Samford in the NCAA tournament ==
Year	Record	Pct	Notes
2012	2–2	.500	Tallahassee Regional
2018	1–2	.333	Tallahassee Regional
2021	0–2	.000	Starkville Regional
2023	1–2	.333	Auburn Regional
TOTALS	5-8	.385	

== Major League Baseball ==
Samford has had 32 Major League Baseball draft selections since the draft began in 1965.

Bulldogs in the Major League Baseball Draft
Year	Player	Round	Team
1985	David Garrison	29	Braves
1994	Wendell Magee	12	Phillies
1996	Erik Metzger	28	Red Sox
1999	Brian Hitchcox	25	Phillies
2007	Joseph Edens	44	Giants
2008	Michael Marseco	11	Brewers
2011	Michael Johnson	31	White Sox
2011	Josh Martin	25	Pirates
2011	Andrew Jones	18	Red Sox
2011	Grant Sides	12	Indians
2012	Charles Basford	37	Yankees
2012	Saxon Butler	33	Yankees
2012	Joe Burns	28	Rangers
2012	Tyler Vanderheiden	19	Mets
2012	Josh Martin	10	Indians
2012	Lex Rutledge	6	Orioles
2012	Brandon Miller	4	Nationals
2013	Heath Quinn	12	Indians
2013	Charles Irby	10	Twins
2013	Phillip Ervin	1	Reds
2014	Tripp Martin	22	Rangers
2014	Tyler Filliben	12	Pirates
2015	Andres Gracia	31	Padres
2016	Heath Quinn	3	Giants
2016	Alex Lee	22	Braves
2016	Hunter Swilling	29	Tigers
2017	Jared Brasher	8	Nationals
2017	Kevin Williams, Jr.	13	Angels
2017	T.J. Dixon	24	Twins
2018	Erin Baldwin	20	Diamondbacks
2018	Troy Dixon	24	Rangers
2019	Stephen Jones	21	Rockies
2019	Branden Fryman	21	Mets
2019	Anthony Mulrine	25	Angels

== See also ==
- List of NCAA Division I baseball programs
