= Southern Conference =

American collegiate athletic conference

- Association: NCAA
- Founded: 1921; 105 years ago
- Commissioner: Michael Cross (since 2023)
- Sports fielded: 21; men's: 11; women's: 9; coeducational: 1
- Division: Division I
- Subdivision: FCS
- No. of teams: 11
- Headquarters: Spartanburg, South Carolina
- Region: Southeast
- Broadcasters: ESPN; CBS Sports; CW Sports
- Website: soconsports.com

Locations
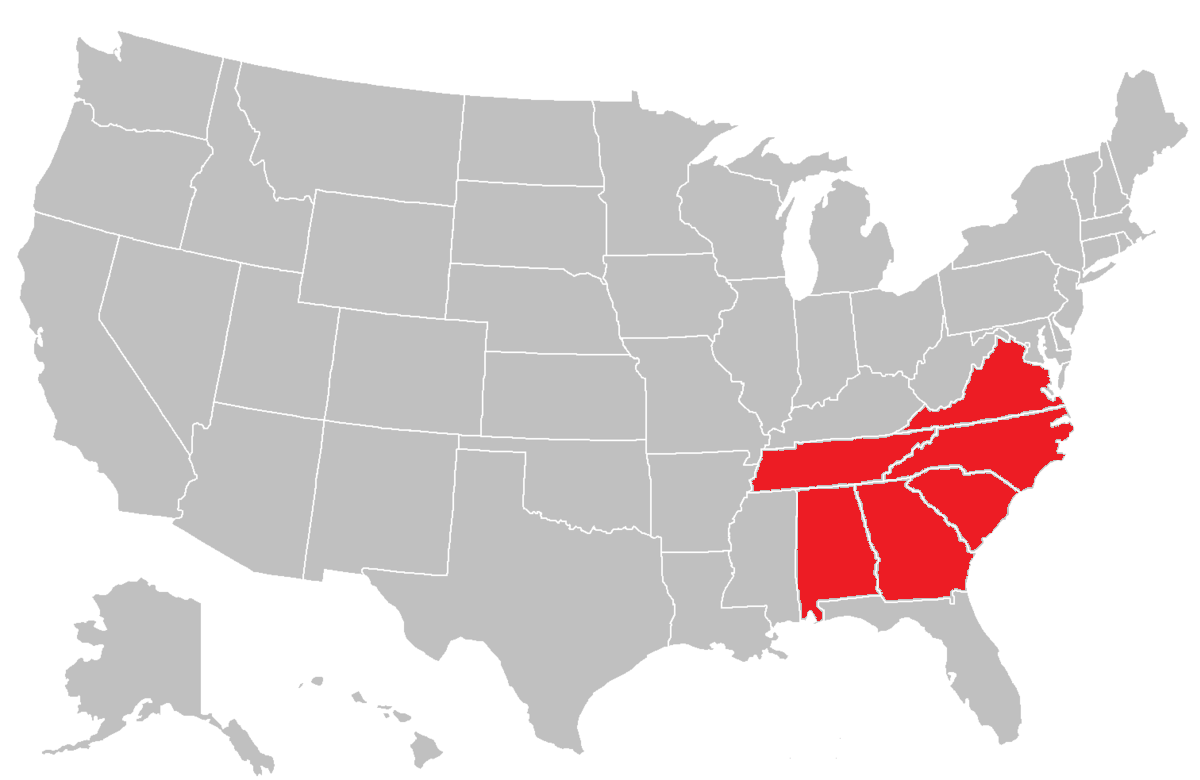

The Southern Conference (SoCon) is a collegiate athletic conference affiliated with the National Collegiate Athletic Association (NCAA) Division I. Southern Conference football teams compete in the Football Championship Subdivision (formerly known as Division I-AA). Member institutions are located in the states of Alabama, Georgia, North Carolina, South Carolina, Tennessee, and Virginia. Established in 1921, the Southern Conference ranks as the fifth-oldest major college athletic conference in the United States, and either the third or fourth oldest in continuous operation, depending on definitions. (Note: Among conferences currently in operation, the Big Ten (1896) and Missouri Valley (1907) are indisputably older. The Pac-12 Conference did not operate under its current charter until 1959 but claims the history of the Pacific Coast Conference, founded in 1915, as its own. The Southwest Conference (SWC) was founded in 1914 but ceased operation in 1996. The Big Eight Conference claimed the same history as the Missouri Valley from 1907 to 1928 during its existence; though it essentially merged with four SWC members to form the Big 12 Conference in 1996, the Big 12 does not claim the Big Eight's legacy. The Ivy League was formally organized in 1954 with athletic competition starting in 1955, but claims the history of the Eastern Intercollegiate Basketball League, which competed from 1901 to 1955, as its own.)

The Southern Conference is considered one of the stronger football conferences in the Football Championship Subdivision and is considered a mid-major conference in basketball. The three-time Division I NCAA Football champion Appalachian State Mountaineers were a member of the conference when they stunned the fifth-ranked Michigan Wolverines 34–32 on September 1, 2007. The Davidson Wildcats reached the Elite Eight in the 2008 NCAA Men's Division I Basketball Tournament by upsetting power programs Gonzaga, Georgetown, and Wisconsin. More recently, the six-time Division I NCAA football champion Georgia Southern Eagles stunned Southeastern Conference power-house Florida Gators 26–20 in The Swamp on November 23, 2013—the first loss to a lower-division opponent in the Florida program's history. In 2015, Furman defeated UCF 16–15 and The Citadel topped South Carolina 23–22 for their second win over the Gamecocks in the past three meetings. On September 4, 2021, East Tennessee State University stunned Vanderbilt 23–3 in their opening game. The SoCon also frequently sees multiple teams selected to participate in the NCAA Division I baseball championship.

The SoCon was the first conference to use the three-point field goal in basketball in a November 29, 1980, game at Western Carolina against Middle Tennessee State University (MTSU), where Ronnie Carr shot the historic shot from 22 feet (6.7 m) away and the Catamounts won 77–70.

== History ==
Southern Conference
Location of SoCon members:
full member
associate member

Conference Commissioners
Wallace Wade	1951–1960
Lloyd Jordon	1960–1973
Ken Germann	1974–1986
Dave Hart	1986–1991
Wright Waters	1991–1998
Alfred B. White	1998–2001
Danny Morrison	2001–2005
John Iamarino	2006–2019
Jim Schaus	2019–2023
Michael Cross	2023–present

Talks of a new conference for Southern athletics had started as early as fall of 1920. The conference was formed on February 25, 1921, in Atlanta as fourteen member institutions split from the Southern Intercollegiate Athletic Association. Southern Conference charter members were Alabama, Auburn, Clemson, Georgia, Georgia Tech, Kentucky, Maryland, Mississippi State, North Carolina, North Carolina State, Tennessee, Virginia, Virginia Tech, and Washington & Lee. In 1922, six more universities—Florida, LSU, Mississippi, South Carolina, Tulane, and Vanderbilt joined the conference. The first year of competition for the conference was in 1922, effective January 1. The new rules banned freshman play. Later additions included Sewanee (1924), Virginia Military Institute (1924), and Duke (1929).

The SoCon is particularly notable for having spawned two other major conferences. In 1932, the 13 schools located south and west of the Appalachians (Alabama, Auburn, Florida, Georgia, Georgia Tech, Kentucky, LSU, Mississippi, Mississippi State, University of the South (Sewanee), Tennessee, Tulane, and Vanderbilt) all departed the SoCon to form the Southeastern Conference (SEC). In 1953, seven additional schools (Clemson, Duke, Maryland, North Carolina, North Carolina State, South Carolina, and Wake Forest) withdrew from the SoCon to form the Atlantic Coast Conference (ACC). The ACC and SEC have gone on to surpass their parent conference in prestige; while the ACC and SEC are considered "power" conferences in Division I FBS (formerly Division I-A), the SoCon dropped to Division I-AA (FCS) in 1982, four years after the top division was split into two levels in 1978.

The SoCon became the first league to hold a post-season basketball tournament to decide a conference champion. Although first played in 1921, it did not become "official" until 1922, and in its first few years included teams which were not conference members. Held at the Municipal Auditorium in Atlanta from February 24 to March 2, 1922, the first meeting was won by North Carolina who defeated non-member Mercer in the Finals 40–25. The SoCon Basketball Tournament continues as the nation's oldest conference tournament. The next-oldest tournament overall is the SEC men's basketball tournament, founded in 1933, but that event was suspended after its 1952 edition and did not resume until 1979. With the demise of the Division II West Virginia Intercollegiate Athletic Conference in 2013, whose tournament had been continuously held since 1936, the next-oldest conference tournament in continuous existence is now the ACC men's basketball tournament, first held in 1954.

== Member schools ==
=== Current full members ===
The all-sports membership changed to 10 schools in 2014 following the departure of Appalachian State, Davidson, Elon, and Georgia Southern, plus the arrival of East Tennessee State (ETSU), Mercer, and VMI. The current football membership stands at nine. UNC Greensboro does not sponsor football, while ETSU relaunched its previously dormant football program in 2015 and rejoined SoCon football in 2016 after one season as an independent.

The 11 members of the Southern Conference are:

Institution	Location	Founded	Type	Enrollment	Endowment (millions)	Nickname	Joined (Note: Represents the calendar year when fall sports competition begins.)	Colors
University of Tennessee at Chattanooga (UTC, UT Chattanooga, Chattanooga)	Chattanooga, Tennessee	1886	Public	11,728	$195	Mocs	1976	
The Citadel	Charleston, South Carolina	1842	S.M.C.	3,693	$423.6	Bulldogs	1936	
East Tennessee State University (ETSU)	Johnson City, Tennessee	1911	Public	9,151	$87.8	Buccaneers	1978	
East Tennessee State University (ETSU)	Johnson City, Tennessee	1911	Public	9,151	$87.8	Buccaneers	2014 (Note: East Tennessee State (ETSU) was previously a full member of the SoCon from 1978–79 to 2004–05.)	
Furman University	Greenville, South Carolina	1826	Nonsectarian (Note: Previously affiliated with the South Carolina Baptist Convention until 1992.)	2,629	$812	Paladins	1936	
Mercer University	Macon, Georgia	1833	Baptist (C.B.F.)	9,026	$502	Bears	2014	
Samford University	Homewood, Alabama	1841	Christian	5,729	$403.5	Bulldogs	2008	
University of North Carolina at Greensboro (UNC Greensboro)	Greensboro, North Carolina	1891	Public	19,764	$368.6	Spartans	1997	
Tennessee Tech University (Tennessee Tech)	Cookeville, Tennessee	1915	Public	9,902	$96.2	Golden Eagles	2026	
Virginia Military Institute (VMI)	Lexington, Virginia	1839	S.M.C.	1,772	$703.1	Keydets	1924	
Virginia Military Institute (VMI)	Lexington, Virginia	1839	S.M.C.	1,772	$703.1	Keydets	2014 (Note: VMI was previously a full member of the SoCon from 1924–25 to 2002–03.)	
Western Carolina University	Cullowhee, North Carolina	1889	Public	12,243	$130	Catamounts	1976	
Wofford College	Spartanburg, South Carolina	1854	United; Methodist	1,773	$417.4	Terriers	1997	

=== Associate members ===
On January 9, 2014, the SoCon and Atlantic Sun Conference (ASUN) (Note: The Atlantic Sun officially used the shortened form of "ASUN Conference" from 2016 to 2023.) announced a new alliance in lacrosse that took effect with the 2015 spring season (2014–15 school year). Under its terms, sponsorship of men's lacrosse shifted from the ASUN to the SoCon, while women's lacrosse sponsorship remained with the ASUN. Bellarmine, which had announced it would join the ASUN for men's lacrosse for the 2015 spring season, instead joined the SoCon. The alliance remains in effect in men's lacrosse, but the leagues amicably ended their full alliance in women's lacrosse once the SoCon began sponsoring that sport in the 2018 spring season (2017–18 school year). However, the conferences maintained their working relationship in women's lacrosse, with the SoCon adding Coastal Carolina as an associate member effective with the 2021 spring season (2020–21 school year) in order to keep both conferences at five women's lacrosse members for 2021. Coastal was intended to play in SoCon women's lacrosse in the 2022 spring season (2021–22 school year) as well, but the SoCon decided to drop the sport after the 2021 spring season (2020–21 school year). While no formal announcement was made, the SoCon–ASUN women's lacrosse partnership definitively ended at that time, as the three full SoCon members who sponsored women's lacrosse moved that sport to the Big South Conference. Coastal and Delaware State both returned women's lacrosse to the ASUN Conference.

The men's lacrosse partnership took a slightly different form from the 2022 spring season (2021–22 school year) forward, as the ASUN reinstated its men's lacrosse league. The two full ASUN members with men's lacrosse programs separated, with Jacksonville remaining in SoCon men's lacrosse while Bellarmine joined the ASUN men's lacrosse league. SoCon associate Air Force also left for ASUN men's lacrosse. The SoCon maintained its automatic NCAA tournament berth with the addition of Hampton.

Before the addition of Hampton men's lacrosse, the most recent addition to the associate membership was Presbyterian wrestling, which joined during summer 2019. Two women's lacrosse members, Central Michigan and Detroit Mercy, left after the 2020 season (2019–20 school year) to join the new women's lacrosse league of Central's full-time home of the Mid-American Conference; this move contributed to the eventual demise of the SoCon women's lacrosse league.

Men's soccer member Belmont left the SoCon after the 2021–22 school year when it joined the Missouri Valley Conference, which sponsors that sport. At the same time, Hampton moved men's lacrosse to its new full-time home of the Colonial Athletic Association, now known as the Coastal Athletic Association.

The addition of men's lacrosse by the Atlantic 10 Conference, announced on May 23, 2022, led to the demise of the SoCon men's lacrosse league after the 2022 season. In addition to Hampton joining the CAA, SoCon associate members High Point and Richmond (the latter a full A-10 member) moved to the A-10, and Jacksonville returned to ASUN men's lacrosse.

Institution	Location	Founded	Type	Enrollment	Nickname	Joined (Note: Represents the calendar year when fall sports competition begins.)	Colors	SoCon sport(s)	Primary conference
University of Alabama at Birmingham (UAB)	Birmingham, Alabama	1969	Public	18,568	Blazers	2016		Rifle	American
Appalachian State University	Boone, North Carolina	1899	Public	20,641	Mountaineers	2014 (Note: The 2014 date reflects the departure of Appalachian State from the SoCon to join the Sun Belt Conference. The Mountaineers have competed in SoCon wrestling continuously since the league first sponsored the sport in 1993–94.)		Men's wrestling	Sun Belt (SBC)
Bellarmine University (Note: Bellarmine competed as an associate member of the SoCon for men's lacrosse from the 2015 to 2021 spring seasons (2014–15 to 2020–21 school years).)	Louisville, Kentucky	1950	Catholic (Archdiocese of Louisville)	3,846	Knights	2020		Men's wrestling	Atlantic Sun (ASUN)
Campbell University	Buies Creek, North Carolina	1887	Baptist	11,241	Fighting; Camels	2011		Men's wrestling	Coastal (CAA)
Davidson College	Davidson, North Carolina	1837	Presbyterian (PCUSA)	1,850	Wildcats	2014 (Note: The 2014 date reflects the departure of Davidson from the SoCon to join the Atlantic 10 Conference (A-10). The Wildcats have competed in SoCon wrestling continuously since the league first sponsored the sport in 1993–94.)		Men's wrestling	Atlantic 10 (A-10)
Gardner–Webb University	Boiling Springs, North Carolina	1905	Southern; Baptist	5,000	Runnin'; Bulldogs	2011		Men's wrestling	Big South (BSC)
Georgia Southern University	Statesboro, Georgia	1906	Public	20,517	Eagles	2016		Rifle	Sun Belt (SBC)
Liberty University	Lynchburg, Virginia	1971	Private	16,000 (Note: Approximate on-campus enrollment. Including online students, Liberty claims an enrollment of over 130,000.)	Flames	2026		Men's soccer	CUSA
Presbyterian College	Clinton, South Carolina	1880	Presbyterian (PCUSA)	1,403	Blue Hose	2019		Men's wrestling	Big South (BSC)

=== Former full members ===
Most former members are currently members of either the Southeastern Conference (SEC) or the Atlantic Coast Conference (ACC). Two of the former full members, Appalachian State and Davidson, maintain SoCon associate membership in men's wrestling. A third former full member, Georgia Southern, became an associate member in rifle when the SoCon added the sport for the 2016–17 school year.

Institution	Location	Founded	Type	Nickname	Joined (Note: Represents the calendar year when fall sports competition begins.)	Left (Note: Represents the calendar year when spring sports competition ends.)	Colors	Current conference
University of Alabama	Tuscaloosa, Alabama	1831	Public	Crimson Tide	1921 (Note: Charter member school began athletic competition on January 1, 1922 (during the 1921–22 school year).)	1932		Southeastern (SEC)
Appalachian State University	Boone, North Carolina	1899	Public	Mountaineers	1971	2014		Sun Belt (SBC)
Auburn University	Auburn, Alabama	1856	Public	Tigers	1921	1932		Southeastern (SEC)
College of Charleston (CofC)	Charleston, South Carolina	1770	Nonsectarian	Cougars	1998	2013		Coastal (CAA)
Clemson University	Clemson, South Carolina	1889	Public	Tigers	1921	1953		Atlantic Coast (ACC)
Davidson College	Davidson, North Carolina	1837	Presbyterian (PCUSA)	Wildcats	1936	1988		Atlantic 10 (A-10)
Davidson College	Davidson, North Carolina	1837	Presbyterian (PCUSA)	Wildcats	1992	2014		Atlantic 10 (A-10)
Duke University	Durham, North Carolina	1838	United; Methodist	Blue Devils	1928	1953		Atlantic Coast (ACC)
East Carolina University	Greenville, North Carolina	1907	Public	Pirates	1964	1976		American
Elon University	Elon, North Carolina	1889	Nonsectarian (Note: Has historic ties with the United Church of Christ.)	Phoenix	2003	2014		Coastal (CAA)
University of Florida	Gainesville, Florida	1853	Public	Gators	1922	1932		Southeastern (SEC)
George Washington University	Washington, D.C.	1821	Federal	Colonials (Note: George Washington's nickname throughout its SoCon tenure was Colonials. The current nickname of Revolutionaries was adopted in 2023.)	1941	1970		Atlantic 10 (A-10)
University of Georgia	Athens, Georgia	1785	Public	Bulldogs	1921	1932		Southeastern (SEC)
Georgia Southern University	Statesboro, Georgia	1906	Public	Eagles	1992	2014		Sun Belt (SBC)
Georgia Institute of Technology (Georgia Tech)	Atlanta, Georgia	1885	Public	Yellow Jackets	1921	1932		Atlantic Coast (ACC)
University of Kentucky	Lexington, Kentucky	1865	Public	Wildcats	1921	1932		Southeastern (SEC)
Louisiana State University (LSU)	Baton Rouge, Louisiana	1860	Public	Tigers	1922	1932		Southeastern (SEC)
Marshall University	Huntington, West Virginia	1837	Public	Thundering Herd	1976	1997		Sun Belt (SBC)
University of Maryland, College Park	College Park, Maryland	1856	Public	Terrapins	1923	1953		Big Ten (B1G)
University of Mississippi (Ole Miss)	Oxford, Mississippi	1848	Public	Rebels	1922	1932		Southeastern (SEC)
Mississippi State University	Starkville, Mississippi	1878	Public	Bulldogs	1921	1932		Southeastern (SEC)
University of North Carolina at Chapel Hill (UNC)	Chapel Hill, North Carolina	1789	Public	Tar Heels	1921	1953		Atlantic Coast (ACC)
North Carolina State University (NC State)	Raleigh, North Carolina	1887	Public	Wolfpack	1921	1953		Atlantic Coast (ACC)
University of Richmond	Richmond, Virginia	1830	Nonsectarian	Spiders	1936	1976		Atlantic 10 (A-10)
Sewanee: The University of the South	Sewanee, Tennessee	1857	Episcopal	Tigers	1923	1932		Southern (SAA) (Note: Currently an NCAA Division III athletic conference.)
University of South Carolina	Columbia, South Carolina	1801	Public	Gamecocks	1922	1953		Southeastern (SEC)
University of Tennessee	Knoxville, Tennessee	1794	Public	Volunteers	1921	1932		Southeastern (SEC)
Tulane University	New Orleans, Louisiana	1834	Nonsectarian	Green Wave	1922	1932		American
Vanderbilt University	Nashville, Tennessee	1873	Nonsectarian	Commodores	1922	1932		Southeastern (SEC)
University of Virginia	Charlottesville, Virginia	1819	Public	Cavaliers	1921	1937		Atlantic Coast (ACC)
Virginia Polytechnic Institute and State University (Virginia Tech)	Blacksburg, Virginia	1872	Public	Hokies	1921	1965		Atlantic Coast (ACC)
Wake Forest University	Winston-Salem, North Carolina	1834	Nonsectarian (Note: Historically affiliated with the Baptist State Convention of North Carolina until 1986.)	Demon Deacons	1936	1953		Atlantic Coast (ACC)
Washington and Lee University	Lexington, Virginia	1749	Nonsectarian	Generals	1921	1958		Old Dominion (ODAC)
West Virginia University	Morgantown, West Virginia	1867	Public	Mountaineers	1950	1968		Big 12 (B12)
College of William & Mary	Williamsburg, Virginia	1693	Public	Tribe	1936	1977		Coastal (CAA)

=== Former associate members ===
Institution	Location	Founded	Type	Nickname	Joined (Note: Represents the calendar year when fall sports competition begins.)	Left (Note: Represents the calendar year when spring sports competition ends.)	Colors	SoCon sport(s)	Primary conference	Current conference in former SoCon sport(s)
United States Air Force Academy (Air Force)	Colorado Springs, Colorado	1954	Federal (Military)	Falcons	2015	2021		Men's lacrosse	Mountain West (MW)	Atlantic Sun (ASUN)
Bellarmine University (Note: Bellarmine remains an associate member of the SoCon for men's wrestling.)	Louisville, Kentucky	1950	Catholic (Archdiocese of Louisville)	Knights	2014	2021		Men's lacrosse	Atlantic Sun (ASUN) (Note: During its tenure as an associate member of the SoCon, Bellarmine was otherwise a member of the Great Lakes Valley Conference (Note: Currently an NCAA Division II athletic conference.) (GLVC) (a conference that had existed since 1978), which remained in that conference through 2019–20, before moving to Division I as a member of the Atlantic Sun Conference (ASUN), where they still compete to this day.)	
Belmont University	Nashville, Tennessee	1890	Nondenominational	Bruins	2018	2022		Men's soccer	Missouri Valley (MVC) (Note: During its tenure as an associate member of the SoCon, Belmont was otherwise a member of the Ohio Valley Conference (OVC), which remained in that conference through 2021–22, before switching to the Missouri Valley Conference (MVC) where they still compete to this day.)	
Central Michigan University	Mount Pleasant, Michigan	1892	Public	Chippewas	2017	2020		Women's lacrosse	Mid-American (MAC)	
Coastal Carolina University	Conway, South Carolina	1954	Public	Chanticleers	2020	2021		Women's lacrosse	Sun Belt (SBC)	Atlantic Sun (ASUN)
Delaware State University	Dover, Delaware	1891	Public (Note: Also a historically black college and university.)	Hornets	2017	2021		Women's lacrosse	Mid-Eastern (MEAC)	Northeast (NEC)
University of Detroit Mercy	Detroit, Michigan	1870	Catholic (Jesuit/RSM)	Titans	2017	2020		Women's lacrosse	Horizon	Mid-American (MAC)
Hampton University	Hampton, Virginia	1868	Nonsectarian	Pirates	2021	2022		Men's lacrosse	Coastal (CAA) (Note: During its tenure as an associate member of the SoCon, Hampton was otherwise a member of the Big South Conference, which remained in that conference only during the 2021–22 school year, after years in the Mid-Eastern Athletic Conference (MEAC), before switching to the Coastal Athletic Association (CAA) where they still compete to this day.)	
High Point University	High Point, North Carolina	1924	United; Methodist	Panthers	2014	2022		Men's lacrosse	Big South (BSC)	Atlantic 10 (A-10)
Jacksonville University	Jacksonville, Florida	1934	Nonsectarian	Dolphins	2014	2022		Men's lacrosse	Atlantic Sun (ASUN)	
University of North Georgia	Dahlonega, Georgia	1873 (Note: On January 10, 2012, the University System of Georgia approved the consolidation of North Georgia College and State University and Gainesville State College to form a new institution, the University of North Georgia in January 2013.)	Public	Nighthawks	2016	2026		Rifle	Peach Belt (PBC)	N/A (Note: North Georgia discontinued its rifle program after the 2025–26 school year.)
University of Richmond	Richmond, Virginia	1830	Nonsectarian	Spiders	2014	2022		Men's lacrosse	Atlantic 10 (A-10)	
Southern Illinois University Edwardsville (SIU Edwardsville, SIUE)	Edwardsville, Illinois	1890	Public	Cougars	2012	2018		Men's wrestling	Ohio Valley (OVC)	Mid-American (MAC)

=== SoCon membership timeline ===
Full member (all sports) Full member (non-football) Associate member (football) Associate member (sport) Other Conference Other Conference

- Due to space limitations, one portion of Washington and Lee's affiliation history is not indicated in the table. In 1958, W&L stopped awarding athletic scholarships; from then until 1962, it was an independent in what was then the NCAA College Division (which was split in 1973 to form today's Divisions II and III).

== Sports ==
The Southern Conference sponsors championship competition in 11 men's, 9 women's, and one co-educational NCAA-sanctioned sports. Five schools are associate members for wrestling. Under a cooperative agreement with the Atlantic Sun Conference (ASUN), the SoCon began sponsoring men's lacrosse in the 2014–15 school year (2015 season) with three full members (Furman, Mercer, VMI) and four associates (Bellarmine, High Point, Jacksonville, Richmond). SoCon men's lacrosse has since added Air Force. Women's lacrosse was sponsored by the ASUN through the 2017 season, after which the SoCon launched its own women's lacrosse league. Beginning in the 2016–17 academic year, after a 30-year hiatus, the SoCon resumed rifle as its 21st sport. Members for conference competition are full members The Citadel, VMI, and Wofford as well as associate members UAB, Georgia Southern, and North Georgia. The SoCon is one of only two all-sports conferences to sponsor rifle, joining the Ohio Valley Conference. Rifle is technically a men's sport for NCAA purposes, but men's, women's, and co-ed teams all compete against each other. Women's lacrosse was added as the 22nd sport for 2017–18, but was dropped after the 2020–21 school year.

The SoCon dropped men's lacrosse after the 2022 season. Affiliate member Hampton joined the Colonial Athletic Association, which sponsors that sport, and the Atlantic 10 Conference, full-time home to men's lacrosse affiliate Richmond, launched a men's lacrosse league in the 2023 season, also taking in another SoCon affiliate in High Point. With SoCon men's lacrosse being gutted by these changes, VMI moved that sport to its former men's lacrosse home of the Metro Atlantic Athletic Conference, and the two remaining men's lacrosse members, Jacksonville and Mercer, moved that sport to the ASUN.

The conference is unique in that it contains the only two full Division I member schools not to field a women's basketball team. The Citadel and VMI do not sponsor the sport at the varsity level; both schools are historically all-male military colleges which only became co-educational in the 1990s.

Teams in Southern Conference competition
Sport	Men's	Women's	Co-ed
Baseball	9	–	–
Basketball	11	10	–
Cross country	11	10	–
Football	10	–	–
Golf	9	10	–
Rifle	2	3	3
Soccer	7	11	–
Softball	–	9	–
Tennis	9	8	–
Track and Field (Indoor)	7	10	–
Track and Field (Outdoor)	8	11	–
Volleyball	–	10	–
Wrestling	9	–	–

=== Men's sponsored sports by school ===
School	Baseball	Basketball	Cross country	Football	Golf	Rifle (Note: Rifle is technically a men's sport, but men's, women's, and co-ed teams all compete against each other.)	Soccer	Tennis	Track & field (indoor)	Track & field (outdoor)	Wrestling	Total SoCon sports
Chattanooga	No	Yes	Yes	Yes	Yes	No	No	Yes	No	No	Yes	6
The Citadel	Yes	Yes	Yes	Yes	No	Yes (Note: Men's rifle team; school also fields a women's team.)	No	Yes	Yes	Yes	Yes	9
East Tennessee State	Yes	Yes	Yes	Yes	Yes	No	Yes	Yes	No	Yes	No	8
Furman	No	Yes	Yes	Yes	Yes	No	Yes	Yes	Yes	Yes	No	8
Mercer	Yes	Yes	Yes	Yes	Yes	No	Yes	Yes	No	No	No	8
Samford	Yes	Yes	Yes	Yes	Yes	No	No	Yes	Yes	Yes	No	8
Tennessee Tech	Yes	Yes	Yes	Yes	Yes	No	No	Yes	No	No	No	6
UNC Greensboro	Yes	Yes	Yes	No	Yes	No	Yes	Yes	Yes	Yes	No	8
VMI	Yes	Yes	Yes	Yes	No	Yes	Yes	No	Yes	Yes	Yes	10
Western Carolina	Yes	Yes	Yes	Yes	Yes	No	No	No	Yes	Yes	No	7
Wofford	Yes	Yes	Yes	Yes	Yes	Yes (Note: Co-ed rifle team)	Yes	Yes	Yes	Yes	No	10
Totals	9	11	11	10	9	3+1 (Note: Associate UAB (co-ed team).)	6+1 (Note: Associate Liberty.)	9	7	8	3+6 (Note: Associates Appalachian State, Bellarmine, Campbell, Davidson, Gardner–Webb, and Presbyterian.)	83+8

Notes

Men's varsity sports not sponsored by the Southern Conference which are played by SoCon schools:

School	Lacrosse	Swimming & diving
Mercer	ASUN	No
VMI	NEC	NEC

=== Women's sponsored sports by school ===
School	Basketball	Cross country	Golf	Rifle (Note: Rifle is technically a men's sport, but men's, women's, and co-ed teams all compete against each other.)	Soccer	Softball	Tennis	Track & field (indoor)	Track & field (outdoor)	Volleyball	Total SoCon teams
Chattanooga	Yes	Yes	Yes	No	Yes	Yes	Yes	Yes	Yes	Yes	9
The Citadel	No	Yes	Yes	Yes (Note: Women's rifle team; school also fields a men's team.)	Yes	No	No	Yes	Yes	Yes	7
East Tennessee State	Yes	Yes	Yes	No	Yes	Yes	Yes	Yes	Yes	Yes	9
Furman	Yes	Yes	Yes	No	Yes	Yes	Yes	Yes	Yes	Yes	10
Mercer	Yes	Yes	Yes	No	Yes	Yes	Yes	No	Yes	Yes	9
Samford	Yes	Yes	Yes	No	Yes	Yes	Yes	Yes	Yes	Yes	9
Tennessee Tech	Yes	Yes	Yes	No	Yes	Yes	No	Yes	Yes	Yes	8
UNC Greensboro	Yes	Yes	Yes	No	Yes	Yes	Yes	Yes	Yes	Yes	9
VMI	No	Yes	No	Yes	Yes	No	No	Yes	Yes	No	5
Western Carolina	Yes	Yes	Yes	No	Yes	Yes	Yes	Yes	Yes	Yes	9
Wofford	Yes	Yes	Yes	Yes (Note: Co-ed rifle team)	Yes	Yes	Yes	Yes	Yes	Yes	10
Totals	9	11	10	3+2 (Note: Associate members Georgia Southern (women-only team) and UAB (co-ed team).)	11	9	8	10	11	10	95+2

Notes

Women's varsity sports not sponsored by the Southern Conference which are played by SoCon schools:

School	Beach volleyball	Lacrosse	Swimming & diving	Water polo
Chattanooga	OVC	No	No	No
Furman	No	Big South	No	No
Mercer	Sun Belt	Big South	No	No
Tennessee Tech	OVC	No	No	No
VMI	No	No	NEC	Metro
Wofford	No	Big South	No	No

== Facilities ==
School	Football stadium	Capacity	Basketball arena	Capacity	Baseball stadium	Capacity	Softball stadium	Capacity	Soccer field	Capacity
Chattanooga	Finley Stadium	20,668	McKenzie Arena	10,928	Non-baseball school		Jim Frost Stadium	3,000	Finley Stadium	20,668
Citadel	Johnson Hagood Stadium	11,500	McAlister Field House	6,000	Joseph P. Riley Jr. Park	6,000	Non-softball school		Non-soccer school	
East Tennessee State	William B. Greene Jr. Stadium	7,694 (Note: Seated capacity; 10,000+ with standing room)	Freedom Hall Civic Center	8,500	Thomas Stadium	1,200	Betty Basler Field	500+	Summers-Taylor Stadium	2,000+
Furman	Paladin Stadium	16,000	Timmons Arena	5,000	Non-baseball school		Pepsi Softball Stadium	300	Eugene E. Stone III Stadium	3,000
Liberty	Men's soccer-only member								Osborne Stadium	1,000
Mercer	Five Star Stadium	10,200	Hawkins Arena	3,500	Claude Smith Field	500	Sikes Field	300	Betts Stadium	500
Samford	Pete Hanna Stadium	6,700	Pete Hanna Center	4,974	Joe Lee Griffin Stadium	1,000	J.T. Haywood Field House	200	Samford Track and Soccer Complex	1,200
Tennessee Tech	Tucker Stadium	16,500	Eblen Center	9,280	Bush Stadium at Averitt Express Baseball Complex	1,100	Tech Softball Field	800	Tech Soccer Field	800
UNC Greensboro	Non-football school		First Horizon Coliseum (men's); Fleming Gymnasium (women's)	7,617; 2,320	UNCG Baseball Stadium	3,500	UNCG Softball Stadium	500+	UNCG Soccer Stadium	3,540
VMI	Alumni Memorial Field	10,000	Cameron Hall	5,020	Gray–Minor Stadium	1,400	Non-softball school		Patchin Field	1,000
Western Carolina	E. J. Whitmire Stadium	13,742	Ramsey Center	7,826	Hennon Stadium	1,500	Catamount Softball Complex	250+	Catamount Athletic Complex	1,000
Wofford	Gibbs Stadium	13,000	Jerry Richardson Indoor Stadium	3,400	Russell C. King Field	2,500	Non-softball school		Snyder Field	2,250

== Conference champions ==
=== Football ===
This is a list of recent champions. For the full history, see List of Southern Conference football champions.

Year	Champion	Record
2016	The Citadel†	8–0
2017	Wofford†	7–1
2018	East Tennessee State; Furman; Wofford†	6–2
2019	Wofford†	7–1
2020	VMI†	6–1
2021	East Tennessee State†	7–1
2022	Samford†	8–0
2023	Furman†	7–1
2024	Mercer†	10–2
2025	Mercer†	9–3

† Automatic bid to NCAA Division I Football Championship

=== Men's basketball ===
This is a partial list of the last 10 regular-season and tournament champions. For the full history, see List of Southern Conference men's basketball champions.

Year	Regular season champion	Record	Tournament champion
2016–17	East Tennessee State (Note: Listed in order of seeding in the conference tournament); UNC Greensboro; Furman	14–4	East Tennessee State
2017–18	UNC Greensboro	15–3	UNC Greensboro
2018–19	Wofford	18–0	Wofford
2019–20	East Tennessee State	16–2	East Tennessee State
2020–21	UNC Greensboro	13–5	UNC Greensboro
2021–22	Chattanooga	14–4	Chattanooga
2022–23	Furman; Samford	15–3	Furman
2023–24	Samford	15–3	Samford
2024–25	Chattanooga	15–3	Wofford
2025–26	East Tennessee State	13–5	Furman

=== Women's basketball ===
This is a partial list of the last 10 tournament champions. For the full history, see Southern Conference women's basketball tournament

Year	Champion
2016	Chattanooga
2017	Chattanooga
2018	Mercer
2019	Mercer
2020	Samford
2021	Mercer
2022	Mercer
2023	Chattanooga
2024	Chattanooga
2025	UNC Greensboro
2026	Samford

=== Baseball ===
This is a partial list of the last 10 champions. For the full history, see Southern Conference baseball tournament.

Year	Reg. season champion	Tournament champion
2017	Mercer	UNC Greensboro
2018	UNC Greensboro	Samford
2019	Samford	Mercer
2020	Season canceled due to COVID-19	
2021	Wofford	Samford
2022	Wofford	UNC Greensboro
2023	Samford	Samford
2024	UNC Greensboro	Wofford
2025	East Tennessee State	East Tennessee State
2026	Mercer	The Citadel

=== Rifle ===
Year	Air rifle champion	Smallbore champion	Overall champion
2017	Georgia Southern	North Georgia	North Georgia
2018	North Georgia	North Georgia	North Georgia
2019	Georgia Southern	UAB	UAB
2020	North Georgia	UAB	UAB
2021	North Georgia	Georgia Southern	North Georgia
2022	Georgia Southern	Georgia Southern	North Georgia
2023	Georgia Southern	Georgia Southern	The Citadel
2024	Georgia Southern	Georgia Southern	Georgia Southern
2025	Georgia Southern	Georgia Southern	Georgia Southern
2026	Georgia Southern	Georgia Southern	Georgia Southern

=== Men's Lacrosse ===
Year	Champion
2015	High Point
2016	Air Force
2017	Air Force
2018	Richmond
2019	Richmond
2020	Not Held
2021	High Point

== Commissioner's and Germann Cups ==
The Commissioner's and Germann Cups are awarded each year to the top men's and women's program in the conference. The Commissioner's Cup was inaugurated in 1970. The Germann Cup, named for former Southern Conference Commissioner Ken Germann, was first awarded in 1987. The completion of the 2013–2014 athletics season saw Appalachian State winning its 33rd Commissioner's Cup and Furman its 13th Germann Cup.

Year	Commissioner's Cup	Germann Cup
1969–70	East Carolina; William & Mary	—
1970–71	William & Mary	—
1971–72	William & Mary	—
1972–73	William & Mary	—
1973–74	East Carolina	—
1974–75	East Carolina	—
1975–76	William & Mary	—
1976–77	East Carolina	—
1977–78	Appalachian State	—
1978–79	Appalachian State	—
1979–80	Appalachian State	—
1980–81	Appalachian State	—
1981–82	Appalachian State	—
1982–83	East Tennessee State	—
1983–84	Appalachian State	—
1984–85	Appalachian State	—
1985–86	Appalachian State	—
1986–87	Appalachian State	Appalachian State
1987–88	Appalachian State	Appalachian State
1988–89	Appalachian State	Appalachian State
1989–90	Appalachian State	Appalachian State
1990–91	Furman	Appalachian State
1991–92	Appalachian State	Appalachian State
1992–93	Appalachian State	Furman
1993–94	Appalachian State	Furman
1994–95	Appalachian State	Furman
1995–96	Appalachian State	Furman
1996–97	Appalachian State	Furman
1997–98	Appalachian State	Furman
1998–99	Appalachian State	Furman
1999–00	Appalachian State	Furman
2000–01	Appalachian State	Furman
2001–02	Appalachian State	Furman
2002–03	Appalachian State	Furman
2003–04	Appalachian State	Furman
2004–05	Chattanooga	College of Charleston
2005–06	Appalachian State	Appalachian State
2006–07	Appalachian State	Appalachian State
2007–08	Appalachian State	Chattanooga
2008–09	Appalachian State	College of Charleston
2009–10	Appalachian State	Samford
2010–11	Appalachian State	Appalachian State
2011–12	Appalachian State	College of Charleston
2012–13	Appalachian State	Appalachian State
2013–14	Appalachian State	Furman
2014–15	Chattanooga	Samford
2015–16	East Tennessee State	Furman
2016–17	East Tennessee State	Furman
2017–18	East Tennessee State	Furman
2018–19	East Tennessee State	Furman
2020–21	Furman	Samford
2021–22	East Tennessee State	Samford
2022–23	Samford	Samford
2023–24	Samford	Samford
2024–25	East Tennessee State	Samford
2025–26	Furman	Furman

== See also ==
- Southern Conference Hall of Fame

== Relevant literature ==
- Iamarino, John. 2020. A Proud History of Athletic History. Mercer University Press.
