= Wofford Terriers baseball =

American intercollegiate athletic team

- 2026 Wofford Terriers baseball team
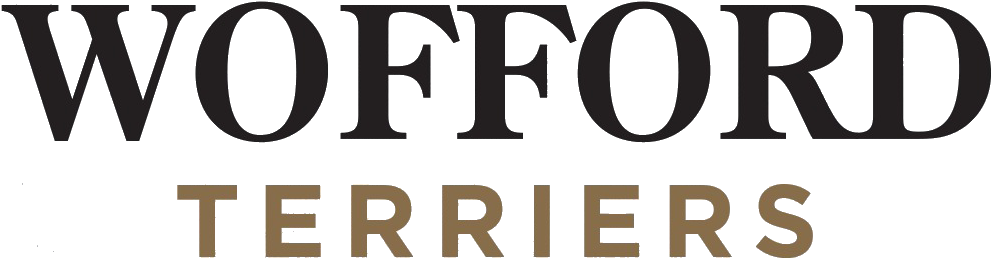
- Founded: 1889; 137 years ago
- University: Wofford College
- Head coach: J.J. Edwards (3rd season)
- Conference: Southern
- Location: Spartanburg, South Carolina
- Home stadium: Russell C. King Field (capacity: 2,500)
- Nickname: Terriers
- Colors: Old gold and black

NCAA tournament appearances
- 2007, 2024

Conference tournament champions
- 2007, 2024

Conference regular season champions
- 2021, 2022

The Wofford Terriers baseball team is a varsity intercollegiate athletic team of Wofford College in Spartanburg, South Carolina, United States. The team is a member of the Southern Conference, which is part of the National Collegiate Athletic Association's Division I. Wofford's first baseball team was fielded in 1889. The team plays its home games at Russell C. King Field in Spartanburg, South Carolina. The Terriers are coached by J.J. Edwards.

== Wofford in the NCAA tournament ==
Year	Record	Pct	Notes
2007	0–2	.000	Columbia Regional
2024	1–2	.333	Chapel Hill Regional
TOTALS	1-4	.200	

== Major League Baseball ==
Wofford has had 20 Major League Baseball draft selections since the draft began in 1965.

Year	Name	Round	Pro Team
1982	Tim Wallace	2 (49)	St. Louis Cardinals
1983	Henry Hubbard	5 (116)	San Diego Padres
1984	Michael Tolleson	30 (714)	Cleveland Indians
1997	Anthony Salley	24 (719)	Toronto Blue Jays
2000	Kevin Blocker	25 (737)	Colorado Rockies
2007	Brandon Waring	7 (229)	Cincinnati Reds
2009	Mike Gilmartin	27 (813)	Oakland Athletics
2011	John Cornely	15 (476)	Atlanta Braves
2012	Alex Wilson	15 (479)	Atlanta Braves
2013	J.D. Osborne	36 (1067)	Houston Astros
2015	Luke Leftwich	7 (204)	Philadelphia Phillies
2015	Will Stillman	29 (861)	Boston Red Sox
2016	Will Stillman	6 (174)	San Diego Padres
2016	Matt Milburn	29 (862)	Oakland Athletics
2018	Adam Scott	4 (133)	Cleveland Indians
2021	Colin Davis	7 (204)	Seattle Mariners
2021	Hayes Heinecke	13 (391)	St. Louis Cardinals
2023	Ryan Galanie	13 (389)	Chicago White Sox
2024	Marshall Toole	15 (451)	New York Yankees
2025	Carter Rasmussen	14 (418)	Boston Red Sox

== See also ==
- List of NCAA Division I baseball programs
