= 1986 NCAA Division I baseball season =

Baseball season

- Number of teams: 265

NCAA tournament

College World Series
- Champions: Arizona (3rd title)
- Runners-up: Florida State (8th CWS Appearance)
- Winning coach: Jerry Kindall (3rd title)
- MOP: Mike Senne (Arizona)

Seasons
- ← 1985 1987 →

The 1986 NCAA Division I baseball season of college baseball in the United States organized by the National Collegiate Athletic Association (NCAA) began in the spring of 1986. The season progressed through the regular season and concluded with the 1986 College World Series. The College World Series, held for the fortieth time in 1986, consisted of one team from each of eight regional competitions and was held in Omaha, Nebraska, at Johnny Rosenblatt Stadium as a double-elimination tournament. Arizona claimed the championship for the third time.

== Realignment and format changes ==
- The Big South Conference was granted NCAA Division I status, joining after one season in the NAIA. The members were Armstrong State, Augusta State, Baptist, Campbell, Coastal Carolina, Radford, UNC Asheville, and Winthrop.
- The Colonial Athletic Association began sponsoring baseball, with American, East Carolina, George Mason, James Madison, Richmond, UNC Wilmington, and William & Mary composing the seven team league.
- The Southeastern Conference dissolved its two-division format, playing as a single conference with all teams playing a three-game series against every other conference member.
- Stetson joined the Trans America Athletic Conference. They had previously played as an independent.

== Conference winners ==
This is a partial list of conference champions from the 1986 season. The NCAA sponsored regional competitions to determine the College World Series participants. Four regionals of four teams and four of six each competed in double-elimination tournaments, with the winners advancing to Omaha. 25 teams earned automatic bids by winning their conference championship while 15 teams earned at-large selections.

Conference	Regular season winner	Conference tournament	Tournament venue • city	Tournament winner
Atlantic Coast Conference	NC State	1986 Atlantic Coast Conference baseball tournament	Durham Athletic Park • Durham, NC	Georgia Tech
Atlantic 10 Conference	East - Rutgers; West - West Virginia	1986 Atlantic 10 Conference baseball tournament	Piscataway, New Jersey	Rutgers
Big East Conference	North - Providence/St. John's; South - Seton Hall	1986 Big East Conference baseball tournament	Muzzy Field • Bristol, CT	St. John's
Big Eight Conference	Oklahoma	1986 Big Eight Conference baseball tournament	All Sports Stadium • Oklahoma City, OK	Oklahoma State
Big South Conference	East - Campbell; West - Augusta State	1986 Big South Conference baseball tournament	Augusta, GA	Coastal Carolina
Big Ten Conference	East - Michigan; West - Minnesota	1986 Big Ten Conference baseball tournament	Siebert Field • Minneapolis, MN	Michigan
Colonial Athletic Association	East Carolina/James Madison	1986 Colonial Athletic Association baseball tournament	Harrington Stadium • Greenville, NC	Richmond
EIBL	Navy	No tournament		
Mid-American Conference	Central Michigan	No tournament		
Midwestern Collegiate Conference	North - Detroit; South - Oral Roberts	1986 Midwestern Collegiate Conference baseball tournament	Detroit, MI	Oral Roberts
Metro Conference	Florida State	1986 Metro Conference baseball tournament	Seminole Stadium • Tallahassee, FL	Florida State
Mid-Continent	Blue - Cleveland State; Gray - Southwest Missouri State	1986 Association of Mid-Continent Universities baseball tournament	Chicago, IL	Southwest Missouri State
Pacific-10 Conference	North - Oregon State; South - UCLA	No tournament		
Pacific Coast Athletic Association	UC Santa Barbara	No tournament		
Southeastern Conference	LSU	1986 Southeastern Conference baseball tournament	Alex Box Stadium • Baton Rouge, LA	LSU
Southern Conference	North - Appalachian State; South - Western Carolina	1986 Southern Conference baseball tournament	Hennon Stadium • Cullowhee, NC	Western Carolina
Southwest Conference	Texas/Texas A&M	1986 Southwest Conference baseball tournament	Olsen Field • College Station, TX	Texas A&M
Trans America Athletic Conference	East - Georgia Southern; West - Hardin–Simmons	1986 Trans America Athletic Conference baseball tournament	Hunter Field • Abilene, TX	Georgia Southern

== Conference standings ==
The following is an incomplete list of conference standings:

1986 Atlantic Coast Conference baseball standings
	Conf.				Overall
Team	W		L	PCT	W		L	PCT
No. 29 NC State ‍†‍‍^{y}	11	–	2	.846	35	–	15	.700
No. 17 Georgia Tech ‍‍‡‍^{y}	10	–	4	.714	45	–	23	.662
Clemson ‍‍‍	9	–	4	.692	42	–	21	.667
North Carolina ‍‍‍	7	–	7	.500	33	–	22	.600
Virginia ‍‍‍	6	–	7	.462	27	–	22	.551
Wake Forest ‍‍‍	6	–	8	.429	29	–	21	.580
Maryland ‍‍‍	3	–	10	.231	18	–	28	.391
Duke ‍‍‍	2	–	12	.143	25	–	17	.595
† – Conference champion ‡ – Tournament champion y – Invited to the NCAA tournament As of June 30, 1986; Rankings from Collegiate Baseball

1986 Atlantic 10 Conference baseball standings
	Conf.						Overall
Team	W		L		T	PCT	W		L		T	PCT
East
Rutgers ^{x}‍‍‡‍^{y}	9	–	2	–	0	.818	28	–	18	–	0	.609
Temple ‍‍‍	8	–	3	–	0	.727	30	–	17	–	1	.635
Rhode Island ‍‍‍	4	–	7	–	1	.375	14	–	15	–	1	.483
UMass ‍‍‍	4	–	7	–	0	.364	16	–	24	–	0	.400
Saint Joseph's ‍‍‍	2	–	8	–	1	.227	6	–	26	–	1	.197
West
West Virginia ^{x}‍‍‍	9	–	2	–	0	.818	24	–	14	–	1	.628
George Washington ‍‍‍	8	–	2	–	0	.800	28	–	13	–	1	.679
Penn State ‍‍‍	7	–	4	–	0	.636	29	–	19	–	0	.604
St. Bonaventure ‍‍‍	2	–	9	–	0	.182	13	–	26	–	0	.333
Duquesne ‍‍‍	1	–	10	–	0	.091	21	–	10	–	0	.677
x – Division champion ‡ – Tournament champion y – Invited to the NCAA tournament As of June 30, 1986; Rankings from Collegiate Baseball

1986 Big East Conference baseball standings
	Conf.						Overall
Team	W		L		T	PCT	W		L		T	PCT
North Division
Providence ^{x}‍‍‍	11	–	7	–	0	.611	28	–	23	–	0	.549
No. 30 St. John's ^{x}‍‍‡‍^{y}	11	–	7	–	0	.611	35	–	15	–	1	.696
Connecticut ‍‍‍	10	–	8	–	0	.556	18	–	21	–	0	.462
Boston College ‍‍‍	4	–	14	–	0	.222	14	–	23	–	0	.378
South Division
Seton Hall ^{x}‍‍‍	13	–	5	–	0	.722	32	–	26	–	0	.552
Georgetown ‍‍‍	12	–	6	–	0	.667	23	–	22	–	0	.511
Villanova ‍‍‍	8	–	10	–	0	.444	21	–	20	–	1	.512
Pittsburgh ‍‍‍	3	–	15	–	0	.167	10	–	22	–	0	.313
x – Division champion ‡ – Tournament champion y – Invited to the NCAA tournament As of June 30, 1986; Rankings from Collegiate Baseball

1986 Big Eight Conference baseball standings
	Conf.				Overall
Team	W		L	PCT	W		L	PCT
No. 22 Oklahoma ‍†‍‍^{y}	19	–	3	.864	44	–	21	.677
No. 4 Oklahoma State ‍‍‡‍^{y}	18	–	5	.783	56	–	15	.789
Nebraska ‍‍‍	14	–	9	.609	35	–	25	.583
Missouri ‍‍‍	12	–	12	.500	33	–	27	.550
Kansas ‍‍‍	7	–	15	.318	12	–	25	.324
Iowa State ‍‍‍	6	–	17	.261	25	–	33	.431
Kansas State ‍‍‍	5	–	19	.208	24	–	34	.414
† – Conference champion ‡ – Tournament champion y – Invited to the NCAA tournament As of June 30, 1986; Rankings from Collegiate Baseball

1986 Big South Conference baseball standings
	Conf.				Overall
Team	W		L	PCT	W		L	PCT
East
Campbell ^{x}‍‍‍	14	–	3	.824	31	–	20	.608
Winthrop ‍‍‍	11	–	4	.733	37	–	10	.787
UNC Asheville ‍‍‍	6	–	11	.353	17	–	32	.347
Radford ‍‍‍	1	–	14	.067	14	–	22	.389
West
Augusta State ^{x}‍‍‍	12	–	6	.667	36	–	23	.610
Coastal Carolina ‍‍‡‍	9	–	9	.500	31	–	19	.620
Baptist ‍‍‍	8	–	10	.444	32	–	19	.627
Armstrong State ‍‍‍	7	–	11	.389	37	–	20	.649
x – Division champion ‡ – Tournament champion As of June 30, 1986; Rankings from Collegiate Baseball

1986 Big Ten Conference baseball standings
	Conf.				Overall
Team	W		L	PCT	W		L	PCT
East
No. 28 Michigan ^{x}‍‍‡‍^{y}	13	–	3	.813	42	–	17	.712
Purdue ‍‍‍	9	–	7	.563	37	–	27	.578
Indiana ‍‍‍	7	–	9	.438	43	–	17	.717
Michigan State ‍‍‍	7	–	9	.438	28	–	26	.519
Ohio State ‍‍‍	4	–	12	.250	21	–	27	.438
West
Minnesota ^{x}‍‍‍	10	–	5	.667	40	–	19	.678
Wisconsin ‍‍‍	10	–	6	.625	35	–	22	.614
Northwestern ‍‍‍	9	–	7	.563	39	–	14	.736
Illinois ‍‍‍	8	–	8	.500	34	–	19	.642
Iowa ‍‍‍	2	–	13	.133	29	–	27	.518
x – Division champion ‡ – Tournament champion y – Invited to the NCAA tournament As of June 30, 1986; Rankings from Collegiate Baseball

1986 Colonial Athletic Association baseball standings
	Conf.						Overall
Team	W		L		T	PCT	W		L		T	PCT
East Carolina ‍†‍‍	13	–	5	–	0	.722	40	–	10	–	0	.800
James Madison ‍†‍‍	13	–	5	–	0	.722	35	–	14	–	0	.714
Richmond ‍‍‡‍^{y}	12	–	6	–	0	.667	24	–	31	–	0	.436
UNC Wilmington ‍‍‍	10	–	8	–	0	.556	29	–	28	–	0	.509
George Mason ‍‍‍	8	–	10	–	0	.444	27	–	20	–	1	.573
William & Mary ‍‍‍	4	–	14	–	0	.222	7	–	38	–	0	.156
American ‍‍‍	3	–	15	–	0	.167	8	–	26	–	0	.235
† – Conference champion ‡ – Tournament champion y – Invited to the NCAA tournament As of June 30, 1986; Rankings from Collegiate Baseball

1986 Eastern College Athletic Conference baseball standings
	Conf.				Overall
Team	W		L	PCT	W		L	PCT
New England
No. 8 Maine ^{x}‍‍‡‍^{y}	13	–	1	.929	41	–	23	.641
Northeastern ‍‍‍	9	–	5	.643	25	–	14	.641
Siena ‍‍‍	7	–	8	.467	21	–	11	.656
New Hampshire ‍‍‍	6	–	8	.429	19	–	18	.514
Vermont ‍‍‍	6	–	9	.400	9	–	19	.321
Hartford ‍‍‍	2	–	12	.143	8	–	34	.190
Metropolitan
Fairleigh Dickinson ^{x}‍‍‍	15	–	6	.714	23	–	16	.590
NYIT ‍‍‍	15	–	6	.714	27	–	27	.500
C. W. Post ‍‍‍	13	–	8	.619	16	–	17	.485
Long Island ‍‍‍	12	–	9	.571	18	–	15	.545
Monmouth ‍‍‍	12	–	9	.571	16	–	20	.444
St. Francis (NY) ‍‍‍	12	–	9	.571	17	–	20	.459
Brooklyn ‍‍‍	3	–	18	.143	5	–	35	.125
Wagner ‍‍‍	2	–	19	.095	3	–	27	.100
Upstate New York
Canisius ^{x}‍‍‍	11	–	3	.786	18	–	6	.750
Utica ‍‍‍	9	–	7	.563	12	–	16	.429
Buffalo ‍‍‍	6	–	8	.429	18	–	21	.462
Colgate ‍‍‍	4	–	6	.400	13	–	17	.433
Niagara ‍‍‍	4	–	10	.286	9	–	26	.257
x – Division champion ‡ – Tournament champion y – Invited to the NCAA tournament As of June 30, 1986; Rankings from Collegiate Baseball

1986 NCAA Division I baseball independents standings
	Conf.				Overall
Team	W		L	PCT	W		L	PCT
UCF ‍‍‍		–		–	46	–	13	.780
No. 12 Tulane ‍‍‍^{y}		–		–	49	–	15	.766
No. 3 Miami (FL) ‍‍‍^{y}		–		–	49	–	17	.742
FIU ‍‍‍		–		–	41	–	18	.695
No. 25 Texas–Pan American ‍‍‍^{y}		–		–	42	–	19	.689
Liberty ‍‍‍		–		–	26	–	14	.650
Pace ‍‍‍		–		–	24	–	15	.615
West Chester ‍‍‍		–		–	23	–	15	.605
Southwestern Louisiana ‍‍‍		–		–	33	–	26	.559
New Orleans ‍‍‍		–		–	29	–	30	.492
United States International ‍‍‍		–		–	28	–	32	.467
New Mexico State ‍‍‍		–		–	20	–	26	.435
Northern Colorado ‍‍‍		–		–	18	–	24	.429
Tennessee State ‍‍‍		–		–	17	–	25	.405
Dayton ‍‍‍		–		–	16	–	25	.390
Manhattan ‍‍‍		–		–	9	–	17	.346
Puget Sound ‍‍‍		–		–	12	–	24	.333
Florida A&M ‍‍‍		–		–	15	–	30	.333
Boston University ‍‍‍		–		–	5	–	30	.143
y – Invited to the NCAA tournament As of June 30, 1986; Rankings from Collegiate Baseball

1986 Metro Conference baseball standings
	Conf.				Overall
Team	W		L	PCT	W		L	PCT
No. 2 Florida State ‍‍‡‍^{y}	15	–	3	.833	61	–	13	.824
Memphis State ‍‍‍	11	–	5	.688	40	–	16	.714
South Carolina ‍‍‍^{y}	11	–	6	.647	43	–	23	.652
Virginia Tech ‍‍‍	11	–	6	.647	38	–	21	.644
Cincinnati ‍‍‍	9	–	9	.500	26	–	28	.481
Southern Miss ‍‍‍	4	–	13	.235	31	–	30	.508
Louisville ‍‍‍	3	–	13	.188	18	–	33	.353
† – Conference champion y – Invited to the NCAA tournament As of June 30, 1986; Rankings from Collegiate Baseball

1986 Association of Mid-Continent Universities baseball standings
	Conf.						Overall
Team	W		L		T	PCT	W		L		T	PCT
Blue Division
Cleveland State ^{x}‍‍‍	7	–	4	–	0	.636	23	–	24	–	0	.489
UIC ‍‍‍	6	–	6	–	0	.500	26	–	26	–	0	.500
Valparaiso ‍‍‍	4	–	7	–	0	.364	22	–	25	–	1	.469
Gray Division
Southwest Missouri State ^{x}‍‍‡‍	11	–	1	–	0	.917	47	–	14	–	0	.770
Western Illinois ‍‍‍	6	–	6	–	0	.500	19	–	22	–	0	.463
Eastern Illinois ‍‍‍	4	–	7	–	0	.364	29	–	22	–	1	.567
Northern Iowa ‍‍‍	2	–	9	–	0	.182	25	–	18	–	1	.580
‡ – Tournament champion As of June 30, 1986; Rankings from Collegiate Baseball

1986 Pacific-10 Conference baseball standings
	Conf.				Overall
Team	W		L	PCT	W		L	PCT
Northern
No. 23 Oregon State ^{x}‍‍‍^{y}	18	–	5	.783	39	–	15	.722
Gonzaga ‍‍‍	13	–	10	.565	30	–	21	.588
Portland State ‍‍‍	12	–	11	.522	39	–	23	.629
Washington State ‍‍‍	11	–	12	.478	35	–	24	.593
Portland ‍‍‍	10	–	13	.435	24	–	26	.480
Washington ‍‍‍	9	–	14	.391	25	–	23	.521
Eastern Washington ‍‍‍	8	–	16	.333	22	–	28	.440
Southern
No. 13 UCLA ^{x}‍‍‍^{y}	21	–	9	.700	39	–	23	.629
No. 1 Arizona ‍‍‍^{y}	18	–	12	.600	49	–	19	.721
No. 15 Stanford ‍‍‍^{y}	18	–	12	.600	38	–	23	.623
Southern California ‍‍‍	12	–	18	.400	26	–	29	.473
Arizona State ‍‍‍	11	–	19	.367	34	–	28	.548
California ‍‍‍	10	–	20	.333	32	–	25	.561
x – Division champion y – Invited to the NCAA tournament As of June 30, 1986; Rankings from Collegiate Baseball

1986 Southeastern Conference baseball standings
	Conf.				Overall
Team	W		L	PCT	W		L	PCT
No. 5 LSU ‍†‍‡‍^{y}	22	–	5	.815	55	–	14	.797
No. 21 Alabama ‍‍‍^{y}	18	–	9	.667	43	–	20	.683
Auburn ‍‍‍	15	–	12	.556	31	–	24	.564
Ole Miss ‍‍‍	14	–	13	.519	38	–	17	.691
Georgia ‍‍‍	14	–	13	.519	35	–	24	.593
Florida ‍‍‍	14	–	13	.519	27	–	26	.509
Mississippi State ‍‍‍	12	–	15	.444	34	–	21	.618
Tennessee ‍‍‍	10	–	17	.370	27	–	23	.540
Vanderbilt ‍‍‍	9	–	18	.333	25	–	29	.463
Kentucky ‍‍‍	7	–	20	.259	25	–	28	.472
† – Conference champion ‡ – Tournament champion y – Invited to the NCAA tournament As of June 30, 1986; Rankings from Collegiate Baseball

1986 Southern Conference baseball standings
	Conf.				Overall
Team	W		L	PCT	W		L	PCT
Northern
Appalachian State ^{x}‍‍‍^{y}	15	–	2	.882	40	–	13	.755
East Tennessee State ‍‍‍	9	–	9	.500	21	–	21	.500
VMI ‍‍‍	7	–	11	.389	15	–	25	.375
Marshall ‍‍‍	4	–	13	.235	15	–	18	.455
Southern
Western Carolina ^{x}‍‍‡‍^{y}	12	–	5	.706	33	–	28	.541
Davidson ‍‍‍	10	–	8	.556	21	–	20	.512
The Citadel ‍‍‍	9	–	9	.500	29	–	20	.592
Furman ‍‍‍	4	–	13	.235	15	–	24	.385
x – Division champion ‡ – SoCon Tournament champion y – Invited to the NCAA tournament As of June 30, 1986; Rankings from Collegiate Baseball

1986 Southwest Conference baseball standings
	Conf.				Overall
Team	W		L	PCT	W		L	PCT
No. 16 Texas ‍†‍‍^{y}	16	–	5	.762	51	–	14	.785
No. 18 Texas A&M ‍‍‡‍^{y}	16	–	5	.762	45	–	23	.662
No. 24 Arkansas ‍‍‍^{y}	15	–	6	.714	43	–	17	.717
Baylor ‍‍‍	12	–	9	.571	40	–	22	.645
Houston ‍‍‍	8	–	13	.381	35	–	23	.603
Texas Tech ‍‍‍	7	–	14	.333	34	–	25	.576
Rice ‍‍‍	5	–	16	.238	34	–	26	.567
TCU ‍‍‍	5	–	16	.238	31	–	29	.517
† – Conference champion ‡ – Tournament champion y – Invited to the NCAA tournament As of June 30, 1986; Rankings from Collegiate Baseball

1986 Trans America Athletic Conference baseball standings
	Conf.				Overall
Team	W		L	PCT	W		L	PCT
East
Georgia Southern ^{x}‍‍‡‍	12	–	6	.667	36	–	23	.610
Mercer ‍‍‍	8	–	10	.444	25	–	24	.510
Georgia State ‍‍‍	8	–	10	.444	23	–	29	.442
Samford ‍‍‍	8	–	10	.444	14	–	37	.275
West
Hardin–Simmons ^{x}‍†‍‍	12	–	4	.750	38	–	25	.603
Centenary ‍‍‍	8	–	7	.533	27	–	28	.491
Arkansas–Little Rock ‍‍‍	3	–	12	.200	11	–	35	.239
Stetson ‍‍‍		–		–	36	–	22	.621
x – Division champion † – Conference champion ‡ – Tournament champion y – Invited to the NCAA tournament As of June 30, 1986; Rankings from Collegiate Baseball

== College World Series ==
The 1986 season marked the fortieth NCAA baseball tournament, which culminated with the eight team College World Series. The College World Series was held in Omaha, Nebraska. The eight teams played a double-elimination format, with Arizona claiming their third championship with a 10–2 win over Florida State in the final.

Upper round 1
Loyola Marymount	4
LSU	3
Arizona	8
Maine	7
Miami (FL)	6
Oklahoma State	2
Florida State	5
Indiana State	3

Upper round 2
Loyola Marymount	5
Arizona	7
Miami (FL)	2
Florida State	7
Lower round 1
LSU	8
Maine	4
Oklahoma State	4
Indiana State	0

Upper final
Arizona	9
Florida State	5
Lower round 2
Miami (FL)	4
LSU	3
Loyola Marymount	5
Oklahoma State	11

Semifinals
Arizona	2
Miami (FL)	4
Florida State	6
Oklahoma State	5

Preliminary final
Miami (FL)	3
Florida State	4

Final
Arizona	10
Florida State	2
