= 1986 Colonial Athletic Association baseball tournament =

American college baseball tournament

- Teams: 4
- Format: Double-elimination tournament
- Finals site: Harrington Field; Greenville, North Carolina
- Champions: Richmond (1st title)
- Winning coach: Ron Atkins (1st title)
- MVP: Kevin Sickinger (Richmond)

1986 Colonial Athletic Association baseball standings
	Conf.						Overall
Team	W		L		T	PCT	W		L		T	PCT
East Carolina ‍†‍‍	13	–	5	–	0	.722	40	–	10	–	0	.800
James Madison ‍†‍‍	13	–	5	–	0	.722	35	–	14	–	0	.714
Richmond ‍‍‡‍^{y}	12	–	6	–	0	.667	24	–	31	–	0	.436
UNC Wilmington ‍‍‍	10	–	8	–	0	.556	29	–	28	–	0	.509
George Mason ‍‍‍	8	–	10	–	0	.444	27	–	20	–	1	.573
William & Mary ‍‍‍	4	–	14	–	0	.222	7	–	38	–	0	.156
American ‍‍‍	3	–	15	–	0	.167	8	–	26	–	0	.235
† – Conference champion ‡ – Tournament champion y – Invited to the NCAA tournament As of June 30, 1986; Rankings from Collegiate Baseball

The 1986 Colonial Athletic Association baseball tournament was held at Harrington Field on the campus of East Carolina in Greenville, North Carolina, from May 15 through 18. The event determined the champion of the Colonial Athletic Association for the 1986 season. It was the first tournament, in the first year that the CAA sponsored baseball. The winner of the tournament, fourth-seeded Richmond, earned the CAA's automatic bid to the 1986 NCAA Division I baseball tournament.

== Format and seeding ==
The top four finishers based on winning percentage from the conference's round robin regular season faced off in a double-elimination tournament.

Team	W	L	Pct.	GB	Seed
James Madison	13	5	.722	—	1
East Carolina	13	5	.722	—	2
Richmond	12	6	.667	1	3
UNC Wilmington	10	8	.556	3	4
George Mason	8	10	.444	5	—
William & Mary	4	14	.222	9	—
American	3	15	.167	10	—

== Bracket and results ==
First round
1	James Madison	10
4	UNC Wilmington	11
3	Richmond	4
2	East Carolina	0
Lower round 1
1	James Madison	6
2	East Carolina	7

Semi-finals
4	UNC Wilmington	2
3	Richmond	3
Lower final
4	UNC Wilmington	8
2	East Carolina	12^{11}

Finals
3	Richmond	8	8
2	East Carolina	12	5

== Most Valuable Player ==
Kevin Sickinger was named Tournament Most Valuable Player. Sickinger was a pitcher and designated hitter for Richmond.
