= 1986 Atlantic 10 Conference baseball tournament =

American college baseball tournament

- Teams: 4
- Format: Double-elimination tournament
- Finals site: Piscataway, New Jersey
- Champions: Rutgers (2nd title)
- Winning coach: Fred Hill (1st title)
- MVP: Sam Ferretti (Rutgers, Player); Ken Smith (West Virginia, Pitcher) ()

1986 Atlantic 10 Conference baseball standings
	Conf.						Overall
Team	W		L		T	PCT	W		L		T	PCT
East
Rutgers ^{x}‍‍‡‍^{y}	9	–	2	–	0	.818	28	–	18	–	0	.609
Temple ‍‍‍	8	–	3	–	0	.727	30	–	17	–	1	.635
Rhode Island ‍‍‍	4	–	7	–	1	.375	14	–	15	–	1	.483
UMass ‍‍‍	4	–	7	–	0	.364	16	–	24	–	0	.400
Saint Joseph's ‍‍‍	2	–	8	–	1	.227	6	–	26	–	1	.197
West
West Virginia ^{x}‍‍‍	9	–	2	–	0	.818	24	–	14	–	1	.628
George Washington ‍‍‍	8	–	2	–	0	.800	28	–	13	–	1	.679
Penn State ‍‍‍	7	–	4	–	0	.636	29	–	19	–	0	.604
St. Bonaventure ‍‍‍	2	–	9	–	0	.182	13	–	26	–	0	.333
Duquesne ‍‍‍	1	–	10	–	0	.091	21	–	10	–	0	.677
x – Division champion ‡ – Tournament champion y – Invited to the NCAA tournament As of June 30, 1986; Rankings from Collegiate Baseball

The 1986 Atlantic Conference baseball tournament was held from May 9 through 11, 1986 to determine the champion of the NCAA Division I the Atlantic 10 Conference, for the 1986 NCAA Division I baseball season. This was the eighth iteration of the event, and was held on the campus of Rutgers in Piscataway, New Jersey. Rutgers won their second championship and earned the conference's automatic bid to the 1986 NCAA Division I baseball tournament.

== Format and seeding ==
The top two teams in each division advanced to the tournament, with each division winner playing the second place team from the opposite division in the first round. The teams played a double-elimination tournament.

Team	W	L	T	Pct	GB	Seed
East Division
Rutgers	9	2	0	.818	—	1E
Temple	8	3	0	.727	1	2E
Rhode Island	4	7	1	.375	5.5	—
UMass	4	7	0	.364	5	—
Saint Joseph's	2	9	1	.208	7.5	—

Team	W	L	T	Pct	GB	Seed
Western Division
West Virginia	9	2	0	.818	—	1W
George Washington	8	2	0	.800	.5	2W
Penn State	7	4	0	.636	2	—
St. Bonaventure	2	9	0	.182	7	—
Duquesne	1	10	0	.091	8	—

== Results ==
First round
1E	Rutgers	14
2W	George Washington	1
1W	West Virginia	16
2E	Temple	3
Lower round 1
2W	George Washington	6
2E	Temple	14

Semi-finals
1E	Rutgers	8
1W	West Virginia	3
Lower final
1W	West Virginia	8
2E	Temple	6

Finals
1E	Rutgers	4	10
1W	West Virginia	9	3
