= 1986 Florida State Seminoles baseball team =

American college baseball season

1986 Florida State Seminoles baseball

Metro Conference Champions Metro Tournament champions South II Regional champions

College World Series, Runner-Up
- Conference: Metro Conference (1975–1995)
- Record: 61–13 (15–3 Metro)
- Head coach: Mike Martin (7th season)
- Assistant coaches: Rod Delmonico (3rd season); Chip Baker (2nd season); Mike McLeod (5th season); Steve Winterling (1st season)
- Home stadium: Seminole Stadium

1986 Metro Conference baseball standings
	Conf.				Overall
Team	W		L	PCT	W		L	PCT
No. 2 Florida State ‍‍‡‍^{y}	15	–	3	.833	61	–	13	.824
Memphis State ‍‍‍	11	–	5	.688	40	–	16	.714
South Carolina ‍‍‍^{y}	11	–	6	.647	43	–	23	.652
Virginia Tech ‍‍‍	11	–	6	.647	38	–	21	.644
Cincinnati ‍‍‍	9	–	9	.500	26	–	28	.481
Southern Miss ‍‍‍	4	–	13	.235	31	–	30	.508
Louisville ‍‍‍	3	–	13	.188	18	–	33	.353
† – Conference champion y – Invited to the NCAA tournament As of June 30, 1986; Rankings from Collegiate Baseball

The 1986 Florida State Seminole baseball team represented Florida State University in the 1986 NCAA Division I baseball season. The Seminoles played their home games at Seminole Stadium. The team was coached by Mike Martin in his 7th season at Florida State.

The Seminoles lost the College World Series, defeated by the Arizona Wildcats in the championship game.

== Roster ==
1986 Florida State Seminoles roster
Pitchers: 32 Al Ashmont - Sophomore; 42 Chip Drobnie - Freshman; 13 Chris Dunn - Junior; 39 Danny Harrell - Junior; 17 Steve Kovensky - Junior; 6 Michael Lee - Sophomore; 4 Richie Lewis - Sophomore; 25 Doug Little - Senior; 44 Mike Loynd - Junior; 29 Chris Pollack - Junior; 30 Ed Porcelli - Junior; 31 Paul Thomas - Sophomore	Infielders: 1 Luis Alicea - Junior; 12 Bien Figueroa - Senior; 7 Chad McClellan - Freshman; 19 Jose Marzan - Junior; 26 Tommy Zoeller - Senior; Catchers: 24 Barry Blackwell - Sophomore; 14 Mike Freeman - Freshman; 43 Ed Fulton - Sophomore; 10 Craig Saxner - Senior	Outfielders: 20 Greg Claybourne - Junior; 18 Keith Kidd - Junior; 9 Eric Mangham - Junior; 2 Deion Sanders - Freshman; 45 Steve Taddeo - Junior; 15 Paul Sorrento - Junior; Coaches: 11 Mike Martin - 7th Season; 8 Rod Delmonico - 3rd Season; 3 Chip Baker - 2nd Season; 33 Mike McLeod - 5th Season; 47 Steve Winterling - 1st Season

== Schedule ==
1986 Florida State Seminoles baseball game log
Regular season
February (11–1)

Date	Opponent	Site/stadium	Score	Win	Loss	Attendance	Overall record	Metro record
February 12	Grambling State	Seminole Stadium • Tallahassee, FL	10–1	Loynd (1–0)	Foley (0–1)	1,075	1–0	–
February 13	Grambling State	Seminole Stadium • Tallahassee, FL	20–6	Kovensky (1–0)	Shaw (0–1)	895	2–0	–
February 14	Grambling State	Seminole Stadium • Tallahassee, FL	1–3	Williams (1–0)	Pollack (0–1)	675	2–1	–
February 15	Southern Miss	Seminole Stadium • Tallahassee, FL	7–6	Kovensky (2–0)	Guin (0–1)	2,513	3–1	1–0
February 15	Southern Miss	Seminole Stadium • Tallahassee, FL	2–0	Lewis (1–0)	Lindsey (0–1)	2,513	4–1	2–0
February 16	Southern Miss	Seminole Stadium • Tallahassee, FL	14–6	Loynd (2–0)	Wagner (0–1)	2,103	5–1	3–0
February 18	Samford	Seminole Stadium • Tallahassee, FL	9–6	Pollack (1–1)	Sims (0–1)	845	6–1	3–0
February 19	Samford	Seminole Stadium • Tallahassee, FL	9–1	Little (1–0)	Wood (0–1)	991	7–1	3–0
February 22	Georgia Tech	Seminole Stadium • Tallahassee, FL	6–4	Lewis (2–0)	Brown (0–1)	3,129	8–1	3–0
February 23	Georgia Tech	Seminole Stadium • Tallahassee, FL	9–4	Loynd (3–0)	Kinard (0–1)	2,513	9–1	3–0
February 25	at Florida	Perry Field • Gainesville, FL	10–6	Little (2–0)	Gedamski (0–2)	1,703	10–1	3–0
February 26	at Florida	Perry Field • Gainesville, FL	10–7	Lewis (3–0)	Sebree (1–1)	1,550	11–1	3–0

March (22–4)

Date	Opponent	Site/stadium	Score	Win	Loss	Attendance	Overall record	Metro record
March 1	South Florida	Seminole Stadium • Tallahassee, FL	9–3	Kovensky (3–0)	Alexander (2–1)	3,117	12–1	3–0
March 2	South Florida	Seminole Stadium • Tallahassee, FL	8–7	Kovensky (4–0)	Rose (3–1)	2,965	13–1	3–0
March 4	at South Florida	Red McEwen Field • Tampa, FL	9–8	Lewis (4–0)	Fagnano (2–1)	1,344	14–1	3–0
March 5	at South Florida	Red McEwen Field • Tampa, FL	3–6	Eiland (1–1)	Loynd (3–1)	1,102	14–2	3–0
March 8	FIU	Seminole Stadium • Tallahassee, FL	9–3	Little (3–0)	Ellis (1–2)	2,213	15–2	3–0
March 9	FIU	Seminole Stadium • Tallahassee, FL	12–10	Lee (1–0)	Cook (1–1)	1,903	16–2	3–0
March 10	Samford	Seminole Stadium • Tallahassee, FL	19–2	Loynd (4–1)	Silas (0–3)	913	17–2	3–0
March 11	Samford	Seminole Stadium • Tallahassee, FL	15–5	Pollack (2–1)	Wood (0–2)	1,031	18–2	3–0
March 12	Richmond	Seminole Stadium • Tallahassee, FL	12–4	Porcelli (1–0)	Walker (0–1)	1,720	19–2	3–0
March 13	Richmond	Seminole Stadium • Tallahassee, FL	14–4	Little (4–0)	Richardson (1–2)	712	20–2	3–0
March 14	Richmond	Seminole Stadium • Tallahassee, FL	16–1	Lewis (5–0)	Lowe (0–2)	1,685	21–2	3–0
March 15	Richmond	Seminole Stadium • Tallahassee, FL	13–3	Loynd (5–1)	Walker (1–1)	2,037	22–2	3–0
March 17	Pittsburgh	Seminole Stadium • Tallahassee, FL	7–0	Pollack (3–1)	Schuster (0–1)	1,877	23–2	3–0
March 18	Pittsburgh	Seminole Stadium • Tallahassee, FL	10–2	Little (5–0)	Gavran (0–1)	1,811	24–2	3–0
March 19	Pittsburgh	Seminole Stadium • Tallahassee, FL	22–1	Lewis (6–0)	Craska (1–1)	1,471	25–2	3–0
March 20	Pittsburgh	Seminole Stadium • Tallahassee, FL	17–1	Loynd (6–1)	Shannon (0–2)	195	26–2	3–0
March 22	at Southern Miss	Pete Taylor Park • Hattiesburg, MS	10–2	Lindsey (3–3)	Little (5–1)	820	26–3	3–1
March 22	at Southern Miss	Pete Taylor Park • Hattiesburg, MS	2–0	Pollack (4–1)	Willis (2–5)	820	27–3	4–1
March 23	at Southern Miss	Pete Taylor Park • Hattiesburg, MS	13–9	Porcelli (2–0)	Pourciau (0–2)	937	28–3	5–1
March 24	at South Alabama	Eddie Stanky Field • Mobile, AL	5–12	Fuller (2–1)	Lewis (6–1)	2,369	28–4	5–1
March 25	at South Alabama	Eddie Stanky Field • Mobile, AL	13–4	Loynd (7–1)	Rub (4–2)	912	29–4	5–1
March 26	South Alabama	Seminole Stadium • Tallahassee, FL	14–4	Little (6–1)	Penry (2–2)	2,298	30–4	5–1
March 27	South Alabama	Seminole Stadium • Tallahassee, FL	13–9	Lee (2–0)	Wilson (2–2)	2,612	31–4	5–1
March 29	at Memphis State	Nat Buring Stadium • Memphis, TN	7–3	Loynd (8–1)	Gallo (3–3)	515	32–4	6–1
March 29	at Memphis State	Nat Buring Stadium • Memphis, TN	6–1	Lewis (7–1)	Covington (3–1)	515	33–4	7–1
March 30	at Memphis State	Nat Buring Stadium • Memphis, TN	2–7	Newcomb (4–1)	Little (6–2)	317	33–5	7–2

April (15–3)

Date	Opponent	Site/stadium	Score	Win	Loss	Attendance	Overall record	Metro record
April 1	UCF	Seminole Stadium • Tallahassee, FL	15–12	Pollack (5–1)	Novak (7–3)	2,487	34–5	7–2
April 2	UCF	Seminole Stadium • Tallahassee, FL	8–3	Loynd (9–1)	Manion (6–4)	1,379	35–5	7–2
April 3	Jacksonville	Seminole Stadium • Tallahassee, FL	9–2	Lewis (8–1)	Stanford (5–4)	2,187	36–5	7–2
April 4	Jacksonville	Seminole Stadium • Tallahassee, FL	11–10	Miller (5–1)	Little (6–3)	2,408	36–6	7–2
April 5	Tulane	Seminole Stadium • Tallahassee, FL	7–5	Pollack (6–1)	Herry (0–1)	2,612	37–6	7–2
April 6	Tulane	Seminole Stadium • Tallahassee, FL	4–2	Little (10–1)	Borgatti (7–1)	2,103	38–6	7–2
April 8	at Jacksonville	Unknown • Jacksonville, FL	20–3	Lewis (9–1)	Stanford (5–5)	1,003	39–6	7–2
April 9	at Jacksonville	Unknown • Jacksonville, FL	11–10	DiRienzio (3–0)	Pollack (6–2)	230	39–7	7–2
April 11	Miami (FL)	Seminole Stadium • Tallahassee, FL	6–1	Loynd (11–1)	Ryan (1–1)	6,145	40–7	7–2
April 12	Miami (FL)	Seminole Stadium • Tallahassee, FL	3–4	Raether (5–1)	Lewis (9–2)	4,893	40–8	7–2
April 13	Miami (FL)	Seminole Stadium • Tallahassee, FL	8–3	Pollack (7–2)	Meizoso (4–3)	5,113	41–8	7–2
April 15	Florida	Seminole Stadium • Tallahassee, FL	7–6	Little (7–3)	Johnson (2–1)	4,530	42–8	7–2
April 16	Florida	Seminole Stadium • Tallahassee, FL	8–0	Loynd (12–1)	Goodrich (2–2)	3,322	43–8	7–2
April 19	Memphis State	Seminole Stadium • Tallahassee, FL	6–0	Pollack (8–2)	Newcomb (5–2)	3,113	44–8	8–2
April 19	Memphis State	Seminole Stadium • Tallahassee, FL	6–5	Lewis (10–2)	Byrd (4–1)	3,113	45–8	9–2
April 20	Memphis State	Seminole Stadium • Tallahassee, FL	7–1	Loynd (13–1)	Covington (4–2)	2,127	46–8	10–2
April 26	at UCF	Unknown • Orlando, FL	3–1	Loynd (14–1)	Manion (8–5)	4,206	47–8	10–2
April 29	at FIU	Unknown • Miami, FL	12–0	Little (8–3)	Cook (8–2)	1,090	48–8	10–2

May (2–2)

Date	Opponent	Site/stadium	Score	Win	Loss	Attendance	Overall record	Metro record
May 2	at Miami (FL)	Mark Light Field • Miami, FL	10–11	Raether (6–1)	Kovensky (4–1)	6,387	48–9	10–2
May 3	at Miami (FL)	Mark Light Field • Miami, FL	14–6	Loynd (15–1)	Meizoso (6–4)	6,566	49–9	10–2
May 4	at Miami (FL)	Mark Light Field • Miami, FL	5–7	Davies (9–0)	Pollack (8–3)	3,858	49–10	10–2
May 19	LSU	Seminole Stadium • Tallahassee, FL	6–4	Porcelli (3–0)	Manuel (9–2)	4,364	54–11	10–2

Postseason
Metro Conference Tournament (3–0)

Date	Opponent	Site/stadium	Score	Win	Loss	Attendance	Overall record	Metro record
May 9	Cincinnati	Seminole Stadium • Tallahassee, FL	10–3	Loynd (16–1)	Sala (3–7)	3,751	50–10	10–2
May 10	South Carolina	Seminole Stadium • Tallahassee, FL	5–8	Menhart (7–0)	Little (8–4)	7,597	50–11	10–2
May 10	Memphis State	Seminole Stadium • Tallahassee, FL	7–3	Pollack (9–3)	Walker (2–1)	7,597	51–11	10–2
May 11	South Carolina	Seminole Stadium • Tallahassee, FL	3–0	Loynd (17–1)	Reed (5–3)	4,811	52–11	10–2
May 12	South Carolina	Seminole Stadium • Tallahassee, FL	7–2	Lewis (11–2)	Boley (5–3)	4,811	53–11	10–2

South II Regional (3–0)

Date	Opponent	Site/stadium	Score	Win	Loss	Attendance	Overall record	Metro record
May 22	NC State	Seminole Stadium • Tallahassee, FL	10–3	Loynd (18–1)	Grossman (17–4)	3,709	55–11	10–2
May 23	Texas A&M	Seminole Stadium • Tallahassee, FL	12–9	Lewis (12–2)	Fry (11–5)	3,907	56–11	10–2
May 24	South Florida	Seminole Stadium • Tallahassee, FL	11–7	Loynd (19–1)	Daughtery (7–1)	5,160	57–11	10–2

1986 College World Series (4–2)

Date	Opponent	Site/stadium	Score	Win	Loss	Attendance	Overall record	Metro record
May 31	vs Indiana State	Rosenblatt Stadium • Omaha, NE	5–3	Loynd (20–1)	Quinzer (13–3)	14,718	58–11	10–2
June 3	vs Miami (FL)	Rosenblatt Stadium • Omaha, NE	7–2	Lewis (13–2)	Davies (9–2)	12,304	59–11	10–2
June 6	vs Arizona	Rosenblatt Stadium • Omaha, NE	5–9	Heredia (16–3)	Loynd (20–2)	14,343	59–12	10–2
June 7	vs Oklahoma State	Rosenblatt Stadium • Omaha, NE	6–5	Lewis (14–2)	Lienhard (2–1)	12,000	60–12	10–2
June 8	vs Miami (FL)	Rosenblatt Stadium • Omaha, NE	4–3	Little (9–4)	Davies (9–3)	11,580	61–12	10–2
June 9	vs Arizona	Rosenblatt Stadium • Omaha, NE	10–2	Alexander (8–2)	Loynd (20–3)	12,659	61–13	10–2

== Awards and honors ==
Mike Loynd

- Golden Spikes Award
- ABCA 1st Team All-American
- Baseball America 1st Team All-American
- South II Regional All-Tournament Team
- Baseball America Pitcher of the Year
- All-Metro Tournament Team
- Metro Tournament MVP
- All-Metro Conference Team

Luis Alicea

- Baseball America 1st Team All-American
- ABCA 2nd Team All-American
- Sporting News All-American
- All-Tournament Team
- South II Regional All-Tournament Team
- South II Regional Tournament MVP
- All-Metro Tournament Team
- All-Metro Conference Team

Richie Lewis

- Baseball America 1st Team All-American
- All-Tournament Team
- South II Regional All-Tournament Team
- All-Metro Conference Team

Paul Sorrento

- Baseball America 2nd Team All-American
- All-Tournament Team
- South II Regional All-Tournament Team
- All-Metro Tournament Team
- All-Metro Conference Team

Jose Marzan

- All-Metro Conference Team

Bien Figueroa

- All-Tournament Team

== Seminoles in the 1986 MLB draft ==
The following members of the Florida State Seminoles baseball program were drafted in the 1986 Major League Baseball draft.

Round	Pick	Player	Position	MLB Club
1	23	Luis Alicea	2B	St. Louis Cardinals
4	103	Paul Sorrento	OF	California Angels
5	130	Bien Figueroa	SS	St. Louis Cardinals
7	163	Mike Loynd	P	Texas Rangers
10	257	Doug Little	P	Chicago White Sox
17	438	Eric Mangham	OF	Los Angeles Dodgers
