= 1986 Big Ten baseball tournament =

1986 Big Ten Conference baseball tournament
- Teams: 4
- Format: Double-elimination
- Finals site: Siebert Field; Minneapolis, MN
- Champions: Michigan (4th title)
- Winning coach: Bud Middaugh (4th title)
- MVP: Tim McIntosh (Minnesota)

1986 Big Ten Conference baseball standings
	Conf.				Overall
Team	W		L	PCT	W		L	PCT
East
No. 28 Michigan ^{x}‍‍‡‍^{y}	13	–	3	.813	42	–	17	.712
Purdue ‍‍‍	9	–	7	.563	37	–	27	.578
Indiana ‍‍‍	7	–	9	.438	43	–	17	.717
Michigan State ‍‍‍	7	–	9	.438	28	–	26	.519
Ohio State ‍‍‍	4	–	12	.250	21	–	27	.438
West
Minnesota ^{x}‍‍‍	10	–	5	.667	40	–	19	.678
Wisconsin ‍‍‍	10	–	6	.625	35	–	22	.614
Northwestern ‍‍‍	9	–	7	.563	39	–	14	.736
Illinois ‍‍‍	8	–	8	.500	34	–	19	.642
Iowa ‍‍‍	2	–	13	.133	29	–	27	.518
x – Division champion ‡ – Tournament champion y – Invited to the NCAA tournament As of June 30, 1986; Rankings from Collegiate Baseball

The 1986 Big Ten Conference baseball tournament was held at Siebert Field on the campus of the University of Minnesota in Minneapolis, Minnesota, from May 16 through 18. The top two teams from the regular season in each division participated in the double-elimination tournament, the sixth annual tournament sponsored by the Big Ten Conference to determine the league champion. Michigan won their fourth tournament championship and earned the Big Ten Conference's automatic bid to the 1986 NCAA Division I baseball tournament.

== Format and seeding ==
The 1986 tournament was a 4-team double-elimination tournament, with seeds determined by conference regular season winning percentage within each division. The top seed from each division played the second seed from the opposite division in the first round. Minnesota claimed the top seed by tiebreaker. Wisconsin made its only appearance in the tournament field before dropping baseball in 1991.

Team	W	L	PCT	GB	Seed
East Division
Michigan	13	3	.813	–	1E
Purdue	9	7	.563	4	2E
Indiana	7	9	.438	6	–
Michigan State	7	9	.438	6	–
Ohio State	4	12	.250	9	–
West Division
Minnesota	10	5	.667	–	1W
Wisconsin	10	5	.667	–	2W
Northwestern	9	7	.563	1.5	–
Illinois	8	8	.500	2.5	–
Iowa	2	13	.133	8	–

== Tournament ==
Upper round 1
1E	Michigan	12
2W	Wisconsin	11
1W	Minnesota	16
2E	Purdue	4
Lower round 1
2W	Wisconsin	14
2E	Purdue	10

Upper final
1E	Michigan	10
1W	Minnesota	7
Lower final
1W	Minnesota	13
2W	Wisconsin	3

Final
1E	Michigan	9
1W	Minnesota	5

== All-Tournament Team ==
The following players were named to the All-Tournament Team.

Pos	Name	School
P	Jim Abbott	Michigan
P	Greg Mau	Minnesota
C	Brad Barsness	Wisconsin
1B	Scott Cepicky	Wisconsin
2B	Steven Finken	Michigan
SS	Mark Hess	Minnesota
3B	Jeff Goergen	Minnesota
OF	Casey Close	Michigan
OF	Tim McIntosh	Minnesota
OF	Bob Shoulders	Purdue
DH	Jay Kvasnicka	Minnesota
DH	Eddy Woolwine	Michigan

=== Most Outstanding Player ===
Tim McIntosh was named Most Outstanding Player. McIntosh was an outfielder for Minnesota.
