= 1986 Maine Black Bears baseball team =

1986 Maine Black Bears baseball

ECAC baseball tournament champion NCAA Northeast Regional champion

College World Series, 0–2
- Conference: Eastern College Athletic Conference
- Record: 41–23 (13–1 ECAC)
- Head coach: John Winkin (12th season)

1986 Eastern College Athletic Conference baseball standings
	Conf.				Overall
Team	W		L	PCT	W		L	PCT
New England
No. 8 Maine ^{x}‍‍‡‍^{y}	13	–	1	.929	41	–	23	.641
Northeastern ‍‍‍	9	–	5	.643	25	–	14	.641
Siena ‍‍‍	7	–	8	.467	21	–	11	.656
New Hampshire ‍‍‍	6	–	8	.429	19	–	18	.514
Vermont ‍‍‍	6	–	9	.400	9	–	19	.321
Hartford ‍‍‍	2	–	12	.143	8	–	34	.190
Metropolitan
Fairleigh Dickinson ^{x}‍‍‍	15	–	6	.714	23	–	16	.590
NYIT ‍‍‍	15	–	6	.714	27	–	27	.500
C. W. Post ‍‍‍	13	–	8	.619	16	–	17	.485
Long Island ‍‍‍	12	–	9	.571	18	–	15	.545
Monmouth ‍‍‍	12	–	9	.571	16	–	20	.444
St. Francis (NY) ‍‍‍	12	–	9	.571	17	–	20	.459
Brooklyn ‍‍‍	3	–	18	.143	5	–	35	.125
Wagner ‍‍‍	2	–	19	.095	3	–	27	.100
Upstate New York
Canisius ^{x}‍‍‍	11	–	3	.786	18	–	6	.750
Utica ‍‍‍	9	–	7	.563	12	–	16	.429
Buffalo ‍‍‍	6	–	8	.429	18	–	21	.462
Colgate ‍‍‍	4	–	6	.400	13	–	17	.433
Niagara ‍‍‍	4	–	10	.286	9	–	26	.257
x – Division champion ‡ – Tournament champion y – Invited to the NCAA tournament As of June 30, 1986; Rankings from Collegiate Baseball

The 1986 Maine Black Bears baseball team represented the University of Maine in the 1986 NCAA Division I baseball season. The Black Bears were led by John Winkin in his 12th year as head coach, and played as a members of the Eastern College Athletic Conference.

Maine posted a 41–23 record and 13–1 in ECAC, and won the Eastern College Athletic Conference Tournament to claim the automatic bid to the 1986 NCAA Division I baseball tournament. They won the Northeast Regional to advance to the 1986 College World Series, their seventh appearance in Omaha. The Black Bears finished tied for seventh after losses to eventual champions Arizona and fifth place LSU.

== Personnel ==
=== Roster ===
1986 Maine Black Bears baseball roster
Pitchers: 4 - Marc Powers - Junior; 9 - Derek Aramburu - Sophomore; 12 - Jay Kemble - Junior; 16 - Dale Plummer - Junior; 18 - Scott Morse - Junior; 23 - Rob Wilkins - Senior; 24 - Steve Loubier - Junior; 25 - George Goldman - Sophomore; 27 - Rick Snyder - Freshman; 29 - Jeff Plympton - Sophomore; 30 - Mike Ballou - Senior; 31 - Mike LeBlanc - Freshman	Catchers: 1 - Bill Reynolds - Senior; 14 - Colin Ryan - Freshman; Outfielders: 6 - Mike Dutil - Freshman; 8 - Gary LaPierre - Sophomore; 11 - Don Hutchinson - Freshman; 15 - Dan Kane - Junior; 20 - Dave Gonyar - Senior; 28 - James Child - Freshman	Infielders: 1 - Gary Dube - Sophomore; 3 - Michael Bordick - Junior; 7 - Rick Bernardo - Senior; 17 - James MacMichael - Freshman; 19 - Dan Etzweiler - Junior; 26 - James Overstreet - Sophomore

==== Coaches ====
1986 Maine Black Bears baseball coaching staff
- 5 - John Winkin - Head coach - 12th season
- 2 - Bob Whalen - Assistant coach - 5th season
- 10 - Rob Roy - Assistant coach - 1st season

== Schedule ==
1986 Maine Black Bears baseball game log
Regular season

March
Date	Opponent	Site/stadium	Score	Overall record	ECAC record
Mar 7	at Miami (FL)*	Mark Light Field • Coral Gables, FL	L 6–7	0–1	
Mar 8	at Florida Atlantic*	Boca Raton, FL	L 1–4	0–2	
Mar 8	at Florida Atlantic*	Boca Raton, FL	L 1–2	0–3	
Mar 9	vs James Madison*	W 8–6	1–3		
	vs Georgetown*		W 8–3	2–3	
Mar 10	vs Southern Illinois*	Mark Light Field • Coral Gables, FL	L 2–4	2–4	
Mar 12	vs Creighton*	FIU Baseball Stadium • Miami, FL	L 4–7	2–5	
Mar 12	at FIU*	FIU Baseball Stadium • Miami, FL	L 4–7	2–6	
	vs Army*		L 7–13	2–7	
	vs Army*		L 7–9	2–8	
	vs Georgetown*		W 8–3	3–8	
Mar 15	vs James Madison*		W 21–5	4–8	
Mar 17	at Miami (FL)*	Mark Light Field • Coral Gables, FL	L 1–3	4–9	
	vs Glassboro State*		W 12–7	5–9	
Mar 18	at FIU*	FIU Baseball Stadium • Miami, FL	L 5–6	5–10	
Mar 19	vs Rutgers*	Miami Gardens, FL	W 14–10	6–10	
Mar 19	at Miami (FL)*	Mark Light Field • Coral Gables, FL	L 3–9	6–11	
Mar 20	vs Michigan State*	Mark Light Field • Coral Gables, FL	W 10–8	7–11	
	vs Glassboro State*		L 0–6	7–12	
Mar 22	at Miami (FL)*	Mark Light Field • Coral Gables, FL	L 2–6	7–13	
Mar 23	at Miami (FL)*	Mark Light Field • Coral Gables, FL	W 8–6	8–13	
	vs Montclair State*	W 5–4	9–13		
Mar 29	at South Carolina*	Sarge Frye Field • Columbia, SC	L 6–14	9–14	
Mar 30	at South Carolina*	Sarge Frye Field • Columbia, SC	L 5–7	9–15	
Mar 31	at South Carolina*	Sarge Frye Field • Columbia, SC	L 6–7	9–16	

April/May
Date	Opponent	Site/stadium	Score	Overall record	ECAC record
	at Rhode Island		W 22–7	10–16	1–0
	at Rhode Island		W 4–3	11–16	2–0
Apr 5	at Hartford		W 4–1	12–16	3–0
Apr 5	at Hartford		W 4–3	13–16	4–0
Apr 12	at UMass*	Earl Lorden Field • Amherst, MA	W 11–5	14–16	
Apr 12	at UMass*	Earl Lorden Field • Amherst, MA	L 5–3	14–17	
	at Northeastern	Parsons Field • Brookline, MA	W 11–2	15–17	5–0
	at Northeastern	Parsons Field • Brookline, MA	W 8–0	16–17	6–0
	at Northeastern	Parsons Field • Brookline, MA	L 3–4	16–18	6–1
Apr 16	at Southern Maine*	Gorham, ME	W 22–9	17–18	
Apr 16	at Southern Maine*	Gorham, ME	W 20–8	18–18	
	New Hampshire	Mahaney Diamond • Orono, ME	W 2–0	19–18	7–1
	New Hampshire	Mahaney Diamond • Orono, ME	W 8–7	20–18	8–1
	New Hampshire	Mahaney Diamond • Orono, ME	W 17–6	21–18	9–1
Apr 25	at Husson*	W 21–2	22–18		
	Siena	Mahaney Diamond • Orono, ME	W 3–0	23–18	10–1
	Siena	Mahaney Diamond • Orono, ME	W 8–1	24–18	11–1
	Siena	Mahaney Diamond • Orono, ME	W 14–7	25–18	12–1
	Bowdoin*	Mahaney Diamond • Orono, ME	W 8–1	26–18	
	St. Joseph's (ME)*	Mahaney Diamond • Orono, ME	W 15–0	27–18	
	Vermont	Mahaney Diamond • Orono, ME	W 10–0	28–18	13–1
	Vermont	Mahaney Diamond • Orono, ME	W 2–0	29–18	14–1
	Vermont	Mahaney Diamond • Orono, ME	W 19–6	30–18	15–1
	Providence*	Mahaney Diamond • Orono, ME	W 7–0	31–18	
	Providence*	Mahaney Diamond • Orono, ME	W 7–2	32–18	
May 12	Miami (FL)*	Mahaney Diamond • Orono, ME	L 6–9	32–19	
May 13	Miami (FL)*	The Ballpark • Old Orchard Beach, ME	W 9–6	33–19	
May 14	Miami (FL)*	The Ballpark • Old Orchard Beach, ME	L 1–9	33–20	

Postseason

ECAC baseball tournament
Date	Opponent	Site/stadium	Score	Overall record	ECACT record
	Northeastern	McCoy Stadium • Pawtucket, RI	L 1–8	33–21	0–1
May 16	Fordham	McCoy Stadium • Pawtucket, RI	W 6–4	34–21	1–1
May 17	Holy Cross	McCoy Stadium • Pawtucket, RI	W 15–3	35–21	2–1
	Northeastern	McCoy Stadium • Pawtucket, RI	W 12–0	36–21	3–1
	NYIT	McCoy Stadium • Pawtucket, RI	W 5–4	37–21	4–1
	NYIT	McCoy Stadium • Pawtucket, RI	W 15–8	38–21	5–1

NCAA Northeast Regional
Date	Opponent	Site/stadium	Score	Overall record	NCAAT record
May 26	Rutgers	Mahaney Diamond • Orono, ME	W 5–1	39–21	1–0
May 26	St. John's	Mahaney Diamond • Orono, ME	W 13–7	40–21	2–0
May 27	St. John's	Mahaney Diamond • Orono, ME	W 21–8	41–21	3–0

College World Series
Date	Opponent	Site/stadium	Score	Overall record	CWS record
June 2	Arizona	Johnny Rosenblatt Stadium • Omaha, NE	L 5–9	41–22	0–1
June 3	LSU	Johnny Rosenblatt Stadium • Omaha, NE	L 7–13	41–23	0–2
