= 1986 Arizona Wildcats baseball team =

American college baseball season

1986 Arizona Wildcats baseball

College World Series Champions vs. Florida State

Central Regional Champions
- Conference: Pacific-10 Conference
- CB: No. 1
- Record: 49-19 (18–12 Pac-10)
- Head coach: Jerry Kindall (14th season)
- Assistant coaches: Jerry Stitt (8th season); Jim Wing (14th season)
- Home stadium: Sancet Stadium

1986 Pacific-10 Conference baseball standings
	Conf.				Overall
Team	W		L	PCT	W		L	PCT
Northern
No. 23 Oregon State ^{x}‍‍‍^{y}	18	–	5	.783	39	–	15	.722
Gonzaga ‍‍‍	13	–	10	.565	30	–	21	.588
Portland State ‍‍‍	12	–	11	.522	39	–	23	.629
Washington State ‍‍‍	11	–	12	.478	35	–	24	.593
Portland ‍‍‍	10	–	13	.435	24	–	26	.480
Washington ‍‍‍	9	–	14	.391	25	–	23	.521
Eastern Washington ‍‍‍	8	–	16	.333	22	–	28	.440
Southern
No. 13 UCLA ^{x}‍‍‍^{y}	21	–	9	.700	39	–	23	.629
No. 1 Arizona ‍‍‍^{y}	18	–	12	.600	49	–	19	.721
No. 15 Stanford ‍‍‍^{y}	18	–	12	.600	38	–	23	.623
Southern California ‍‍‍	12	–	18	.400	26	–	29	.473
Arizona State ‍‍‍	11	–	19	.367	34	–	28	.548
California ‍‍‍	10	–	20	.333	32	–	25	.561
x – Division champion y – Invited to the NCAA tournament As of June 30, 1986; Rankings from Collegiate Baseball

The 1986 Arizona Wildcats baseball team represented the University of Arizona in the 1986 NCAA Division I baseball season. The team was coached by Jerry Kindall in his 14th season at Arizona.

The Wildcats won the College World Series, defeating the Florida State Seminoles in the championship game.

== Roster ==
1986 Arizona Wildcats roster
Pitchers: David Carley; Jason Klonoski; Joe Estes; Gil Heredia; Jeff Hird; Derek Huenneke; Jim McDonald; Thomas Wieser	Infielders: Chip Hale; Tom Hinzo; Gar Millay; Dave Rohde; Chip Stratton; Todd Trafton; Gary Wagner; Craig Lapiner	Outfielders: Gary Alexander; Chuck Johnson; Kevin Long; Mike Senne; David Shermet; Pat Waid; Catchers: Scott Engle; Steven Strong; David Taylor; Mike Thorell

=== Coaches ===
1986 Arizona Wildcats baseball coaching staff
- Jerry Kindall - Head coach
- Jerry Stitt - Assistant coach
- Jim Wing - Assistant coach

== 1986 Schedule and results ==
1986 Arizona Wildcats baseball game log
Regular season
Date	Opponent	Site/Stadium	Score	Overall Record	Pac-10 Record
Jan 30	Grand Canyon	Sancet Stadium • Tucson, AZ	W 8-6	1-0	
Jan 31	at Grand Canyon	Brazell Field • Phoenix, AZ	L 2-4	1-1	
Feb 3	Cal State Dominguez Hills	Sancet Stadium • Tucson, AZ	W 12-2	2-1	
Feb 4	Cal State Dominguez Hills	Sancet Stadium • Tucson, AZ	L 7-8	2-2	
Feb 5	Cal State Dominguez Hills	Sancet Stadium • Tucson, AZ	L 10-13	2-3	
Feb 6	Pepperdine	Sancet Stadium • Tucson, AZ	W 1-0	3-3	
Feb 7	Pepperdine	Sancet Stadium • Tucson, AZ	W 5-4	4-3	
Feb 8	Pepperdine	Sancet Stadium • Tucson, AZ	W 3-2	5-3	
Feb 10	Western New Mexico	Sancet Stadium • Tucson, AZ	W 15-1	6-3	
Feb 11	Western New Mexico	Sancet Stadium • Tucson, AZ	W 20-4	7-3	
Feb 13	Cal State Fullerton	Sancet Stadium • Tucson, AZ	L 7-10	7-4	
Feb 14	Cal State Fullerton	Sancet Stadium • Tucson, AZ	W 8-6	8-4	
Feb 15	Cal State Fullerton	Sancet Stadium • Tucson, AZ	L 6-9	8-5	
Feb 18	Texas Southern	Sancet Stadium • Tucson, AZ	W 20-1	9-5	
Feb 19	Texas Southern	Sancet Stadium • Tucson, AZ	W 22-4	10-5	
Feb 20	Texas Southern	Sancet Stadium • Tucson, AZ	W 15-2	11-5	
Feb 21	at Hawaii	Rainbow Stadium • Honolulu, HI	W 11-8	12-5	
Feb 22	at Hawaii	Rainbow Stadium • Honolulu, HI	L 5-9	12-6	
Feb 23	at Hawaii	Rainbow Stadium • Honolulu, HI	W 7-2	13-6	
Feb 28	Stanford	Sancet Stadium • Tucson, AZ	L 4-6	13-7	0-1
Mar 1	Stanford	Sancet Stadium • Tucson, AZ	W 8-5	14-7	1-1
Mar 2	Stanford	Sancet Stadium • Tucson, AZ	L 4-7	14-8	1-2
Mar 7	at California	Evans Diamond • Berkeley, CA	W 2-1	15-8	2-2
Mar 8	at California	Evans Diamond • Berkeley, CA	W 7-4	16-8	3-2
Mar 11	Hartford	Sancet Stadium • Tucson, AZ	W 21-3	17-8	
Mar 12	Hartford	Sancet Stadium • Tucson, AZ	W 16-4	18-8	
Mar 14	at USC	Dedeaux Field • Los Angeles, CA	L 0-5	18-9	3-3
Mar 15	at USC	Dedeaux Field • Los Angeles, CA	L 12-14	18-10	3-4
Mar 17	at Long Beach State	Campus Baseball Field • Long Beach, CA	W 12-3	19-10	
Mar 18	at USC	Dedeaux Field • Los Angeles, CA	W 6-3	20-10	4-4
Mar 21	UCLA	Sancet Stadium • Tucson, AZ	W 14-5	21-10	5-4
Mar 22	UCLA	Sancet Stadium • Tucson, AZ	L 5-28	21-11	5-5
Mar 23	UCLA	Sancet Stadium • Tucson, AZ	L 9-12	21-12	5-6
Mar 27	New Mexico State	Sancet Stadium • Tucson, AZ	W 4-2	22-12	
Mar 28	New Mexico State	Sancet Stadium • Tucson, AZ	W 21-4	23-12	
Mar 29	New Mexico State	Sancet Stadium • Tucson, AZ	W 9-4	24-12	
Mar 31	Seton Hall	Sancet Stadium • Tucson, AZ	W 10-1	25-12	
Apr 1	Seton Hall	Sancet Stadium • Tucson, AZ	W 13-0	26-12	
Apr 2	Seton Hall	Sancet Stadium • Tucson, AZ	W 12-11	27-12	
Apr 4	California	Sancet Stadium • Tucson, AZ	W 6-3	28-12	6-6
Apr 5	California	Sancet Stadium • Tucson, AZ	W 5-4	29-12	7-6
Apr 6	California	Sancet Stadium • Tucson, AZ	W 11-8	30-12	8-6
Apr 7	at California	Evans Diamond • Berkeley, CA	W 17-16	31-12	9-6
Apr 11	at Arizona State	Packard Stadium • Tempe, AZ	L 9-12	31-13	9-7
Apr 12	at Arizona State	Packard Stadium • Tempe, AZ	W 5-3	32-13	10-7
Apr 13	at Arizona State	Packard Stadium • Tempe, AZ	L 5-6	32-14	10-8
Apr 18	USC	Sancet Stadium • Tucson, AZ	W 10-3	33-14	11-8
Apr 19	USC	Sancet Stadium • Tucson, AZ	W 9-4	34-14	12-8
Apr 20	USC	Sancet Stadium • Tucson, AZ	W 19-17	35-14	13-8
Apr 25	at UCLA	Jackie Robinson Stadium • Los Angeles, CA	L 5-17	35-15	13-9
Apr 26	at UCLA	Jackie Robinson Stadium • Los Angeles, CA	W 12-4	36-15	14-9
Apr 27	at UCLA	Jackie Robinson Stadium • Los Angeles, CA	L 13-14	36-16	14-10
May 2	at Stanford	Sunken Diamond • Palo Alto, CA	W 2-1	37-16	15-10
May 3	at Stanford	Sunken Diamond • Palo Alto, CA	L 4-14	37-17	15-11
May 4	at Stanford	Sunken Diamond • Palo Alto, CA	L 3-8	37-18	15-12
May 12	Grand Canyon	Sancet Stadium • Tucson, AZ	W 9-6	38-18	
May 16	Arizona State	Sancet Stadium • Tucson, AZ	W 9-4	39-18	16-12
May 17	Arizona State	Sancet Stadium • Tucson, AZ	W 18-2	40-18	17-12
May 18	Arizona State	Sancet Stadium • Tucson, AZ	W 22-11	41-18	18-12
NCAA Central Regional
May 22	vs San Diego State	Disch-Falk Field • Austin, TX	W 26-5	42-18	
May 23	at Texas	Disch-Falk Field • Austin, TX	W 9-3	43-18	
May 24	vs Pepperdine	Disch-Falk Field • Austin, TX	W 10-6	44-18	
May 25	vs Pepperdine	Disch-Falk Field • Austin, TX	W 5-3	45-18	
College World Series
May 30	vs Maine	Johnny Rosenblatt Stadium • Omaha, NE	W 8-7	46-18	
Jun 2	vs Loyola Marymount	Johnny Rosenblatt Stadium • Omaha, NE	W 7-5	47-18	
Jun 6	vs Florida State	Johnny Rosenblatt Stadium • Omaha, NE	W 9-5	48-18	
Jun 7	vs Miami (FL)	Johnny Rosenblatt Stadium • Omaha, NE	L 2-4	48-19	
Jun 9	vs Florida State	Johnny Rosenblatt Stadium • Omaha, NE	W 10-2	49-19	

=== Central Regional ===
Central Regional Teams
Pepperdine Waves	Texas-Pan American Broncs	Arizona Wildcats	San Diego State Aztecs	Texas Longhorns	Southern Illinois Salukis

at Austin, TX

First round
1	Pepperdine	11
6	Texas–Pan American	0
2	Arizona	26
5	San Diego State	5
3	Texas	21
4	Southern Illinois	7

Second round
Pepperdine	5
Southern Illinois	3
Arizona	9
Texas	3
Texas–Pan American	10
San Diego State	6

Third round
Pepperdine	6
Arizona	10
Texas	9
Texas–Pan American	5

Semifinals
Pepperdine	2*
Texas	0*

Final
Arizona	5	—
Pepperdine	3	—

== College World Series ==
1980 College World Series Teams
Arizona Wildcats	Florida State Seminoles	Indiana State Sycamores	Loyola Marymount Lions	LSU Tigers	Maine Black Bears	Miami Hurricanes	Oklahoma State Cowboys

Upper round 1
Loyola Marymount	4
LSU	3
Arizona	8
Maine	7
Miami (FL)	6
Oklahoma State	2
Florida State	5
Indiana State	3

Upper round 2
Loyola Marymount	5
Arizona	7
Miami (FL)	2
Florida State	7
Lower round 1
LSU	8
Maine	4
Oklahoma State	4
Indiana State	0

Upper final
Arizona	9
Florida State	5
Lower round 2
Miami (FL)	4
LSU	3
Loyola Marymount	5
Oklahoma State	11

Semifinals
Arizona	2
Miami (FL)	4
Florida State	6
Oklahoma State	5

Preliminary final
Miami (FL)	3
Florida State	4

Final
Arizona	10
Florida State	2

== Awards and honors ==
Gil Heredia

- Third Team All-American
- First Team All-Pac-10 South

Mike Senne

- College World Series Most Outstanding Player
- First Team All-Pac-10 South

Steve Strong

- First Team All-Pac-10 South

Todd Trafton

- College World Series All-Tournament Team
- First Team All-Pac-10 South

== 1986 MLB draft ==
Player	Position	Round	Overall	MLB team
Dave Rohde	INF	5	120	Houston Astros
Todd Trafton	INF	5	127	Chicago White Sox
Tommy Hinzo	INF	7	161	Cleveland Indians
Michael Senne	OF	14	364	St. Louis Cardinals
David Carley	RHP	16	399	Milwaukee Brewers
Joel Estes	LHP	23	586	Houston Astros
Jim McDonald	RHP	26	656	Montreal Expos
Gar Millay	INF	28	690	Texas Rangers
