= 1986 Southeastern Conference baseball tournament =

- Teams: 4
- Format: Four-team double elimination tournament
- Finals site: Alex Box Stadium (1938); Baton Rouge, Louisiana
- Champions: LSU (1st title)
- Winning coach: Skip Bertman (1st title)
- MVP: Jeff Yurtin (LSU)
- Attendance: 14,240

1986 Southeastern Conference baseball standings
	Conf.				Overall
Team	W		L	PCT	W		L	PCT
No. 5 LSU ‍†‍‡‍^{y}	22	–	5	.815	55	–	14	.797
No. 21 Alabama ‍‍‍^{y}	18	–	9	.667	43	–	20	.683
Auburn ‍‍‍	15	–	12	.556	31	–	24	.564
Ole Miss ‍‍‍	14	–	13	.519	38	–	17	.691
Georgia ‍‍‍	14	–	13	.519	35	–	24	.593
Florida ‍‍‍	14	–	13	.519	27	–	26	.509
Mississippi State ‍‍‍	12	–	15	.444	34	–	21	.618
Tennessee ‍‍‍	10	–	17	.370	27	–	23	.540
Vanderbilt ‍‍‍	9	–	18	.333	25	–	29	.463
Kentucky ‍‍‍	7	–	20	.259	25	–	28	.472
† – Conference champion ‡ – Tournament champion y – Invited to the NCAA tournament As of June 30, 1986; Rankings from Collegiate Baseball

The 1986 Southeastern Conference baseball tournament was held at Alex Box Stadium in Baton Rouge, LA from May 9 through 11. LSU won the tournament and earned the Southeastern Conference's automatic bid to the 1986 NCAA tournament.

== Regular season results ==
Team	W	L	Pct	GB	Seed
LSU	22	5	.815	—	1
Alabama	18	9	.667	4	2
Auburn	15	12	.556	7	3
Georgia	14	13	.519	8	4
Ole Miss	14	13	.519	8	—
Florida	14	13	.519	8	—
Mississippi State	12	15	.444	10	—
Tennessee	10	17	.370	12	—
Vanderbilt	9	18	.333	13	—
Kentucky	7	20	.259	15	—

== Tournament ==
First round
3	Auburn	7
2	Alabama	8
4	Georgia	6
1	LSU	10
Lower round 1
3	Auburn	7
4	Georgia	11

Semi-finals
2	Alabama	7
1	LSU	10
Lower final
4	Georgia	6
2	Alabama	4

Finals
1	LSU	8	—
4	Georgia	4	—

== All-Tournament Team ==
Position	Player	School
1B	Pete Freeman	Georgia
2B	Mike Qualls	Alabama
3B	Jeff Yurtin	LSU
SS	Jimmy Harrell	Georgia
C	Doug Duke	Alabama
OF	Joey Belle	LSU
OF	Mike Papajohn	LSU
OF	Trey Gainous	Auburn
UT	Pat Bailey	Alabama
P	Cris Carpenter	Georgia
P	Barry Manuel	LSU
MVP	Jeff Yurtin	LSU
