= 1986 Southern Conference baseball tournament =

- Teams: 4
- Format: Double-elimination tournament
- Finals site: Hennon Stadium; Cullowhee, North Carolina
- Champions: Western Carolina (2nd title)
- MVP: David Hyatt (Western Carolina)

1986 Southern Conference baseball standings
| | Conf. | | | | Overall |
| Team | W | | L | PCT | W | | L | PCT |
|---|---|---|---|---|---|---|---|---|
Northern
| Appalachian State ^{x}‍‍‍^{y} | 15 | – | 2 | .882 | 40 | – | 13 | .755 |
| East Tennessee State ‍‍‍ | 9 | – | 9 | .500 | 21 | – | 21 | .500 |
| VMI ‍‍‍ | 7 | – | 11 | .389 | 15 | – | 25 | .375 |
| Marshall ‍‍‍ | 4 | – | 13 | .235 | 15 | – | 18 | .455 |
Southern
| Western Carolina ^{x}‍‍‡‍^{y} | 12 | – | 5 | .706 | 33 | – | 28 | .541 |
| Davidson ‍‍‍ | 10 | – | 8 | .556 | 21 | – | 20 | .512 |
| The Citadel ‍‍‍ | 9 | – | 9 | .500 | 29 | – | 20 | .592 |
| Furman ‍‍‍ | 4 | – | 13 | .235 | 15 | – | 24 | .385 |
x – Division champion ‡ – SoCon Tournament champion y – Invited to the NCAA tournament As of June 30, 1986; Rankings from Collegiate Baseball

The 1986 Southern Conference baseball tournament was held at Hennon Stadium on the campus of Western Carolina University in Cullowhee, North Carolina, from April 27 through 29. The South Division's top seed Western Carolina won the tournament and earned the Southern Conference's automatic bid to the 1986 NCAA Division I baseball tournament.

The tournament used a double-elimination format.

== Seeding ==
The top two teams from each division based on regular season conference winning percentage participated in the tournament. The top seed from the North Division played the second seed from the South in the first round, and vice versa. The winners of the first round then played, while the losers played an elimination game. There were no ties in the standings, so no tiebreakers were necessary.

| Team | W | L | Pct | GB | Seed |
|---|---|---|---|---|---|
North Division
| Appalachian State | 15 | 2 | .882 | – | 1N |
| East Tennessee State | 9 | 9 | .500 | 6.5 | 2N |
| VMI | 7 | 11 | .389 | 8.5 | – |
| Marshall | 4 | 13 | .235 | 11 | – |
South Division
| Western Carolina | 12 | 5 | .706 | – | 1S |
| Davidson | 10 | 8 | .556 | 2.5 | 2S |
| The Citadel | 9 | 9 | .500 | 3.5 | – |
| Furman | 4 | 13 | .235 | 8 | – |

== Bracket ==
First round
1N | Appalachian State | 5
2S | Davidson | 4
1S | Western Carolina | 11
2N | East Tennessee State | 2
Lower round 1
2S | East Tennessee State | 7
2N | Davidson | 5

Semi-finals
1N | Appalachian State | 17
1S | Western Carolina | 18
Lower final
1N | Appalachian State | 16
2S | East Tennessee State | 14

Finals
1S | Western Carolina | 11 | –
1N | Appalachian State | 8 | –

== Most Outstanding Player ==
Walt Nadzak Award, Tournament Most Outstanding Player
David Hyatt
Western Carolina
