= Tim McIntosh =

Tim McIntosh may refer to:

- Tim McIntosh (cricketer), New Zealand cricketer
- Tim McIntosh (baseball), American baseball player
