= 1986 Big East Conference baseball tournament =

American college baseball tournament

- Teams: 4
- Format: Double-elimination
- Finals site: Muzzy Field; Bristol, CT
- Champions: St. John's (2nd title)
- Winning coach: Joe Russo (2nd title)
- MVP: Tom Finke (St. John's)

1986 Big East Conference baseball standings
| | Conf. | | | | | | Overall |
| Team | W | | L | | T | PCT | W | | L | | T | PCT |
|---|---|---|---|---|---|---|---|---|---|---|---|---|
North Division
| Providence ^{x}‍‍‍ | 11 | – | 7 | – | 0 | .611 | 28 | – | 23 | – | 0 | .549 |
| No. 30 St. John's ^{x}‍‍‡‍^{y} | 11 | – | 7 | – | 0 | .611 | 35 | – | 15 | – | 1 | .696 |
| Connecticut ‍‍‍ | 10 | – | 8 | – | 0 | .556 | 18 | – | 21 | – | 0 | .462 |
| Boston College ‍‍‍ | 4 | – | 14 | – | 0 | .222 | 14 | – | 23 | – | 0 | .378 |
South Division
| Seton Hall ^{x}‍‍‍ | 13 | – | 5 | – | 0 | .722 | 32 | – | 26 | – | 0 | .552 |
| Georgetown ‍‍‍ | 12 | – | 6 | – | 0 | .667 | 23 | – | 22 | – | 0 | .511 |
| Villanova ‍‍‍ | 8 | – | 10 | – | 0 | .444 | 21 | – | 20 | – | 1 | .512 |
| Pittsburgh ‍‍‍ | 3 | – | 15 | – | 0 | .167 | 10 | – | 22 | – | 0 | .313 |
x – Division champion ‡ – Tournament champion y – Invited to the NCAA tournament As of June 30, 1986; Rankings from Collegiate Baseball

The 1986 Big East baseball tournament was held at Muzzy Field in Bristol, Connecticut. This was the second annual Big East baseball tournament. The St. John's Redmen won their second consecutive tournament. As a result, St. John's earned the Big East Conference's automatic bid to the 1986 NCAA Division I baseball tournament.

== Format and seeding ==
The 1986 Big East baseball tournament was a 4 team double elimination tournament, the same as the previous year. The top two teams from each division, based on conference winning percentage, earned berths in the field. Each division winner faced the runner up from the opposite division in the first round. Providence claimed the top seed from the North by defeating St. John's in the regular season series.

| Team | W | L | Pct. | GB | Seed |
|---|---|---|---|---|---|
North Division
| Providence | 11 | 7 | .611 | – | 1N |
| St. John's | 11 | 7 | .611 | – | 2N |
| Connecticut | 10 | 8 | .556 | 1 | – |
| Boston College | 4 | 14 | .222 | 7 | – |
South Division
| Seton Hall | 13 | 5 | .722 | – | 1S |
| Georgetown | 12 | 6 | .667 | 1 | 2S |
| Villanova | 8 | 10 | .444 | 5 | – |
| Pittsburgh | 3 | 15 | .167 | 10 | – |

== Tournament ==
First round
1N | Providence | 2
2S | Georgetown | 1
1S | Seton Hall | 6
2N | St. John's | 11
Lower round 1
2S | Georgetown | 4
1S | Seton Hall | 8

Semi-finals
1N | Providence | 5
2N | St. John's | 3
Lower final
2N | St. John's | 11
1S | Seton Hall | 10

Finals
1N | Providence | 5 | 4
2N | St. John's | 15 | 13

== All-Tournament Team ==
The following players were named to the All-Tournament team.

| Position | Player | School |
|---|---|---|
| 1B | Jerry Kelly | St. John's |
| 2B | Tony Bonura | St. John's |
| 3B | Frank Caccavalle | St. John's |
| SS | John Valentine | Seton Hall |
| C | Scott deMarrais | St. John's |
| OF | Tom Finke | St. John's |
| OF | Vic DiPasquale | Seton Hall |
| OF | Jerry Carroll | Providence |
| DH | Pat Murray | St. John's |
| P | Wayne Rosenthal | St. John's |
| P | Jim Bisceglia | St. John's |

== Jack Kaiser Award ==
Tom Finke was the winner of the 1986 Jack Kaiser Award. Finke was a left fielder for St. John's.
