= 1986 Big South Conference baseball tournament =

- Teams: 4
- Format: Double-elimination
- Finals site: Augusta State University; Augusta, Georgia
- Champions: Coastal Carolina (1st title)
- Winning coach: Bobby Richardson (1st title)
- MVP: Terry Spires (Coastal Carolina)

1986 Big South Conference baseball standings
	Conf.				Overall
Team	W		L	PCT	W		L	PCT
East
Campbell ^{x}‍‍‍	14	–	3	.824	31	–	20	.608
Winthrop ‍‍‍	11	–	4	.733	37	–	10	.787
UNC Asheville ‍‍‍	6	–	11	.353	17	–	32	.347
Radford ‍‍‍	1	–	14	.067	14	–	22	.389
West
Augusta State ^{x}‍‍‍	12	–	6	.667	36	–	23	.610
Coastal Carolina ‍‍‡‍	9	–	9	.500	31	–	19	.620
Baptist ‍‍‍	8	–	10	.444	32	–	19	.627
Armstrong State ‍‍‍	7	–	11	.389	37	–	20	.649
x – Division champion ‡ – Tournament champion As of June 30, 1986; Rankings from Collegiate Baseball

The 1986 Big South Conference baseball tournament was the postseason baseball tournament for the Big South Conference, held from May 13 through 15, 1986, on the campus of Augusta State University in Augusta, Georgia. Four teams participated in the double-elimination tournament. The Big South played the season at the NCAA Division I level, but did not receive an automatic bid to the 1986 NCAA Division I baseball tournament. Coastal Carolina won the championship.

== Format ==
The top four finishers from the regular season qualified for the tournament.

Team	W	L	Pct.	GB	Seed
East
Campbell	14	3	.824	—	1E
Winthrop	11	4	.733	2	2E
UNC Asheville	6	11	.353	8	—
Radford	1	14	.067	12	—

Team	W	L	Pct.	GB	Seed
West
Augusta State	12	6	.667	—	1W
Coastal Carolina	9	9	.500	3	2W
Baptist	8	10	.444	4	—
Armstrong State	7	11	.389	5	—

== Bracket and results ==
First round
1E	Campbell	4
2W	Coastal Carolina	5
1W	Augusta State	6
2E	Winthrop	5
Lower round 1
1E	Campbell	4
2E	Winthrop	6

Semi-finals
2W	Coastal Carolina	5
1W	Augusta State	0
Lower final
1W	Augusta State	2
2E	Winthrop	6

Finals
2W	Coastal Carolina	20	—
2E	Winthrop	2	—

== All-Tournament Team ==
Name	School
Neal Clatterbuck	Winthrop
Glenn Fortner	Coastal Carolina
Scott Goins	Winthrop
Trent Mercer	Augusta State
John Pilatich	Coastal Carolina
Donnie Poteet	Augusta State
Mike Prochaska	Coastal Carolina
Art Smith	Coastal Carolina
Terry Spires	Coastal Carolina
Tom Sutryk	Coastal Carolina
Kevin Thomas	Coastal Carolina
James White	Campbell

=== Most Valuable Player ===
Terry Spires was named Tournament Most Valuable Player. Spires was a shortstop for Coastal Carolina.
