= 1986 Southwest Conference baseball tournament =

- Teams: 4
- Format: Double-elimination tournament
- Finals site: Olsen Field; College Station, TX
- Champions: Texas A&M (1st title)
- Winning coach: Mark Johnson (1st title)

1986 Southwest Conference baseball standings
	Conf.				Overall
Team	W		L	PCT	W		L	PCT
No. 16 Texas ‍†‍‍^{y}	16	–	5	.762	51	–	14	.785
No. 18 Texas A&M ‍‍‡‍^{y}	16	–	5	.762	45	–	23	.662
No. 24 Arkansas ‍‍‍^{y}	15	–	6	.714	43	–	17	.717
Baylor ‍‍‍	12	–	9	.571	40	–	22	.645
Houston ‍‍‍	8	–	13	.381	35	–	23	.603
Texas Tech ‍‍‍	7	–	14	.333	34	–	25	.576
Rice ‍‍‍	5	–	16	.238	34	–	26	.567
TCU ‍‍‍	5	–	16	.238	31	–	29	.517
† – Conference champion ‡ – Tournament champion y – Invited to the NCAA tournament As of June 30, 1986; Rankings from Collegiate Baseball

The 1986 Southwest Conference baseball tournament was the league's annual postseason tournament used to determine the Southwest Conference's (SWC) automatic bid to the 1986 NCAA Division I baseball tournament. The tournament was held from May 16 through 19 at Olsen Field on the campus of Texas A&M University in College Station, Texas.

Due to rain delays, the loser's bracket and semifinal games were canceled, resulting in the winners of the first round games advancing directly to the finals.

The number 2 seed Texas A&M Aggies went 3–0 to win the team's first SWC tournament under head coach Mark Johnson.

== Format and seeding ==
The tournament featured the top four finishers of the SWC's 8 teams in a double-elimination tournament.

Place	Team	Conference				Overall			Seed
Place	Team	W	L	%	GB	W	L	%	Seed
1	Texas	16	5	.762	-	51	14	.785	1
2	Texas A&M	16	5	.762	0	45	23	.662	2
3	Arkansas	15	6	.714	1	43	17	.717	3
4	Baylor	12	9	.571	4	40	22	.645	4
5	Houston	8	13	.381	8	35	23	.603	-
6	Texas Tech	7	14	.333	9	34	25	.576	-
7	Rice	5	16	.238	11	34	26	.567	-
8	TCU	5	16	.238	11	31	29	.517	-

== Tournament ==
Upper round 1
1	Texas	5
4	Baylor	13
2	Texas A&M	4
3	Arkansas	0
Lower round 1
Canceled

Upper final
Canceled
Lower final
Canceled

Final
4	Baylor	0	6
2	Texas A&M	8	7
