= 1986 Trans America Athletic Conference baseball tournament =

American college baseball tournament

- Teams: 2
- Format: Double-elimination
- Finals site: Hunter Field; Abilene, Texas
- Champions: Georgia Southern (3rd title)
- Winning coach: Jack Stallings (3rd title)
- MVP: Mike Shepherd (Georgia Southern)

1986 Trans America Athletic Conference baseball standings
	Conf.				Overall
Team	W		L	PCT	W		L	PCT
East
Georgia Southern ^{x}‍‍‡‍	12	–	6	.667	36	–	23	.610
Mercer ‍‍‍	8	–	10	.444	25	–	24	.510
Georgia State ‍‍‍	8	–	10	.444	23	–	29	.442
Samford ‍‍‍	8	–	10	.444	14	–	37	.275
West
Hardin–Simmons ^{x}‍†‍‍	12	–	4	.750	38	–	25	.603
Centenary ‍‍‍	8	–	7	.533	27	–	28	.491
Arkansas–Little Rock ‍‍‍	3	–	12	.200	11	–	35	.239
Stetson ‍‍‍		–		–	36	–	22	.621
x – Division champion † – Conference champion ‡ – Tournament champion y – Invited to the NCAA tournament As of June 30, 1986; Rankings from Collegiate Baseball

The 1986 Trans America Athletic Conference baseball tournament was held at Hunter Field on the campus of Hardin–Simmons in Abilene, Texas, on April 25 and 26. This was the eighth tournament championship held by the Trans America Athletic Conference, in its eighth year of existence. Georgia Southern won their third tournament championship.

== Format and seeding ==
The winner of each of the conference's two divisions met in a best of three series. Stetson was ineligible as a new member of the conference.

Team	W	L	Pct.	GB	Seed
East
Georgia Southern	12	6	.667	—	1E
Mercer	8	10	.444	4	—
Georgia State	8	10	.444	4	—
Samford	8	10	.444	4	—

Team	W	L	Pct.	GB	Seed
West
Hardin–Simmons	12	4	.750	—	1W
Centenary	8	7	.533	3.5	—
Arkansas–Little Rock	3	12	.200	8.5	—
Stetson				—	—

== Bracket ==
Finals
1E	Georgia Southern	20	8	25
1W	Hardin–Simmons	3	9	15

== All-Tournament Team ==
The following players were named to the All-Tournament Team.

POS	Player	School
P	Billy Brooks	Georgia Southern
P	Troy Holcomb	Georgia Southern
C	Rob Haranda	Georgia Southern
1B	Craig Cooper	Georgia Southern
2B	Dan Gealy	Georgia Southern
SS	Steve Arias	Hardin–Simmons
3B	Jim Cunningham	Georgia Southern
OF	Mike Shepherd	Georgia Southern
OF	Joe Bonanno	Georgia Southern
OF	Lynn Turner	Hardin–Simmons
OF	Shane Gravens	Hardin–Simmons
DH	Gilbert Arredondo	Hardin–Simmons

=== Most Valuable Player ===
Mike Shepherd was named Tournament Most Valuable Player. Shepherd was an outfielder for Georgia Southern.
