= 1986 Oklahoma State Cowboys baseball team =

American college baseball season

1986 Oklahoma State Cowboys baseball

Big Eight champions Midwest Regional champions

College World Series, T-5th
- Conference: Big Eight Conference
- CB: No. 4
- Record: 56–15 (18–5 Big 8)
- Head coach: Gary Ward (9th season)
- Pitching coach: Tom Holliday (9th season)
- Home stadium: Allie P. Reynolds Stadium

1986 Big Eight Conference baseball standings
| | Conf. | | | | Overall |
| Team | W | | L | PCT | W | | L | PCT |
|---|---|---|---|---|---|---|---|---|
| No. 22 Oklahoma ‍†‍‍^{y} | 19 | – | 3 | .864 | 44 | – | 21 | .677 |
| No. 4 Oklahoma State ‍‍‡‍^{y} | 18 | – | 5 | .783 | 56 | – | 15 | .789 |
| Nebraska ‍‍‍ | 14 | – | 9 | .609 | 35 | – | 25 | .583 |
| Missouri ‍‍‍ | 12 | – | 12 | .500 | 33 | – | 27 | .550 |
| Kansas ‍‍‍ | 7 | – | 15 | .318 | 12 | – | 25 | .324 |
| Iowa State ‍‍‍ | 6 | – | 17 | .261 | 25 | – | 33 | .431 |
| Kansas State ‍‍‍ | 5 | – | 19 | .208 | 24 | – | 34 | .414 |
† – Conference champion ‡ – Tournament champion y – Invited to the NCAA tournament As of June 30, 1986; Rankings from Collegiate Baseball

The 1986 Oklahoma State Cowboys baseball team represented Oklahoma State University in the 1986 NCAA Division I baseball season. The Cowboys played their home games at Allie P. Reynolds Stadium. The team was coached by Gary Ward in his 9th year at Oklahoma State.

The Cowboys won the Midwest Regional to advance to the College World Series, where they were defeated by the Florida State Seminoles.

== Roster ==
1986 Oklahoma State Cowboys baseball team
Players
Coaches

| # | Pos. | Name | B/T | Height | Weight | Year | Home town |
|---|---|---|---|---|---|---|---|
| | INF | Jimmy Barragan | / | — | — | So | San Diego, California |
| | OF | Anthony Blackmon | / | — | — | | Indianapolis, Indiana |
| | RHP | Jeff Bronkey | R/R | 6 ft 3 in (1.91 m) | 215 lb (98 kg) | Jr | Klamath Falls, Oregon |
| | | Paul Calvaresi | / | — | — | Fr |
| | | Chris Deaton | / | — | — |
| | C | Carlos Diaz | R/R | 6 ft 3 in (1.91 m) | 190 lb (86 kg) | | Elizabeth, New Jersey |
| | LHP | Gordie Dillard | /L | — | — | | Salinas, California |
| | INF | Sergio Espinal | R/R | 6 ft 0 in (1.83 m) | 175 lb (79 kg) | Sr | New York, New York |
| | INF | Monty Fariss | / | — | — | Fr | Leedey, Oklahoma |
| | LHP | Mike Gardella | /L | — | — | Fr | New York, New York |
| | P | Joe Giordanella | / | — | — |
| | P | David Havely | / | — | — |
| | RHP | Pat Hope | /R | — | — | Fr | Stillwater, Oklahoma |
| | INF | Jim Ifland | / | — | — | | Santa Cruz, California |
| | | Bryn Kosco | / | — | — |
| | RHP | Steve Lienhard | /R | — | — | | McAlester, Oklahoma |
| | RHP | Jimmy Long | /R | — | — | So | Midwest City, Oklahoma |
| | | Mark Malizia | / | — | — |
| | | Bob McKercher | / | — | — |
| | RHP | David Osteen | /R | — | — | | Annville, Pennsylvania |
| | RHP | Tim Pugh | /R | — | — | Fr | Bartlesville, Oklahoma |
| | | Jerry Retton | / | — | — |
| | | Brad Robinson | / | — | — |
| | RHP | Marv Rockman | /R | 6 ft 0 in (1.83 m) | 180 lb (82 kg) | | Fort Gibson, Oklahoma |
| | P | Scott Sadler | / | — | — |
| | | Mike Skoutelakis | / | — | — |
| | C | Adam Smith | / | — | — | Fr | San Jose, California |
| | RHP | Brett Swisher | /R | 6 ft 0 in (1.83 m) | 180 lb (82 kg) |
| | RHP | Chuck Tate | /R | — | — | | Bartlesville, Oklahoma |
| | INF | Robin Ventura | L/R | — | — | Fr | Santa Maria, California |
| | RHP | Rob Walton | /R | 5 ft 10 in (1.78 m) | 165 lb (75 kg) | Sr | Rutherford, New Jersey |
| | OF | Scott Wilkinson | R/R | 6 ft 1 in (1.85 m) | 190 lb (86 kg) | Jr | Anaheim, California |

Head coach

20 Gary Ward

Assistant coach(es)

Wade Robertson

Pitching coach(es)

Tom Holliday

Legend

- (C) Team captain
- (S) Suspended
- (I) Ineligible
- Injured
- Current redshirt

Roster
Last update: March 18, 2021

== Schedule ==
1986 Oklahoma State Cowboys baseball game log
Regular season
February (1–0)

| # | Date | Opponent | Site/stadium | Score | Overall record | Big 8 record |
|---|---|---|---|---|---|---|
| 1 | February 28 | at Rice | Cameron Field • Houston, Texas | 6–2 | 1–0 | – |

March (11–10)

| # | Date | Opponent | Site/stadium | Score | Overall record | Big 8 record |
|---|---|---|---|---|---|---|
| 2 | March 1 | at Rice | Cameron Field • Houston, Texas | 0–4 | 1–1 | – |
| 3 | March 2 | vs Rice | Cameron Field • Houston, Texas | 4–5 | 1–2 | – |
| 4 | March 5 | at UNLV | Rebel Field • Paradise, Nevada | 18–12 | 2–2 | – |
| 5 | March 6 | at UNLV | Rebel Field • Paradise, Nevada | 7–6 | 2–3 | – |
| 6 | March 7 | vs BYU | Rebel Field • Paradise, Nevada | 7–6 | 3–3 | – |
| 7 | March 8 | vs BYU | Rebel Field • Paradise, Nevada | 19–21 | 3–4 | – |
| 8 | March 11 | at Lamar | Vincent–Beck Stadium • Beaumont, Texas | 2–0 | 4–4 | – |
| 9 | March 12 | vs Miami (OH) | Cougar Field • Houston, Texas | 23–8 | 5–4 | – |
| 10 | March 13 | at Houston | Perry Field • Gainesville, Florida | 0–4 | 5–5 | – |
| 11 | March 14 | at Houston | Cougar Field • Houston, Texas | 19–9 | 6–5 | – |
| 12 | March 17 | Rice | Allie P. Reynolds Stadium • Stillwater, Oklahoma | 31–3 | 7–5 | – |
| 13 | March 18 | Rice | Allie P. Reynolds Stadium • Stillwater, Oklahoma | 21–5 | 8–5 | – |
| 14 | March 22 | Florida | Allie P. Reynolds Stadium • Stillwater, Oklahoma | 4–7 | 8–6 | – |
| 15 | March 23 | Florida | Allie P. Reynolds Stadium • Stillwater, Oklahoma | 16–7 | 9–6 | – |
| 16 | March 24 | Florida | Allie P. Reynolds Stadium • Stillwater, Oklahoma | 14–4 | 10–6 | – |
| 17 | March 26 | Wichita State | Allie P. Reynolds Stadium • Stillwater, Oklahoma | 0–3 | 10–7 | – |
| 18 | March 27 | New Mexico | Allie P. Reynolds Stadium • Stillwater, Oklahoma | 13–2 | 11–7 | – |
| 19 | March 28 | Oklahoma | Allie P. Reynolds Stadium • Stillwater, Oklahoma | 7–8 | 11–8 | 0–1 |
| 20 | March 29 | at Oklahoma | L. Dale Mitchell Baseball Park • Norman, Oklahoma | 2–8 | 11–9 | 0–2 |
| 21 | March 29 | vs Oklahoma | All Sports Stadium • Oklahoma City, Oklahoma | 2–3 | 11–10 | 0–3 |
| 22 | March 30 | at Oklahoma | L. Dale Mitchell Baseball Park • Norman, Oklahoma | 22–3 | 12–10 | 1–3 |

April (29–0)

| # | Date | Opponent | Site/stadium | Score | Overall record | Big 8 record |
|---|---|---|---|---|---|---|
| 23 | April 1 | at Arkansas | George Cole Field • Fayetteville, Arkansas | 11–9 | 13–10 | 1–3 |
| 24 | April 4 | Kansas State | Allie P. Reynolds Stadium • Stillwater, Oklahoma | 4–2 | 14–10 | 2–3 |
| 25 | April 5 | Kansas State | Allie P. Reynolds Stadium • Stillwater, Oklahoma | 12–3 | 15–10 | 3–3 |
| 26 | April 5 | Kansas State | Allie P. Reynolds Stadium • Stillwater, Oklahoma | 19–6 | 16–10 | 4–3 |
| 27 | April 6 | Kansas State | Allie P. Reynolds Stadium • Stillwater, Oklahoma | 17–0 | 17–10 | 5–3 |
| 28 | April 8 | North Texas State | Allie P. Reynolds Stadium • Stillwater, Oklahoma | 9–1 | 18–10 | 5–3 |
| 29 | April 8 | North Texas State | Allie P. Reynolds Stadium • Stillwater, Oklahoma | 8–2 | 19–10 | 5–3 |
| 30 | April 9 | North Texas State | Allie P. Reynolds Stadium • Stillwater, Oklahoma | 13–2 | 20–10 | 5–3 |
| 31 | April 9 | North Texas State | Allie P. Reynolds Stadium • Stillwater, Oklahoma | 11–3 | 21–10 | 5–3 |
| 32 | April 11 | Arkansas–Little Rock | Allie P. Reynolds Stadium • Stillwater, Oklahoma | 18–5 | 22–10 | 5–3 |
| 33 | April 11 | Arkansas–Little Rock | Allie P. Reynolds Stadium • Stillwater, Oklahoma | 15–0 | 23–10 | 5–3 |
| 34 | April 12 | Arkansas–Little Rock | Allie P. Reynolds Stadium • Stillwater, Oklahoma | 11–3 | 24–10 | 5–3 |
| 35 | April 12 | Arkansas–Little Rock | Allie P. Reynolds Stadium • Stillwater, Oklahoma | 11–1 | 25–10 | 5–3 |
| 36 | April 13 | Texas Tech | Allie P. Reynolds Stadium • Stillwater, Oklahoma | 18–4 | 26–10 | 5–3 |
| 37 | April 15 | Arkansas | Allie P. Reynolds Stadium • Stillwater, Oklahoma | 8–7 | 27–10 | 5–3 |
| 38 | April 16 | Missouri Southern | Allie P. Reynolds Stadium • Stillwater, Oklahoma | 8–3 | 28–10 | 5–3 |
| 39 | April 16 | Missouri Southern | Allie P. Reynolds Stadium • Stillwater, Oklahoma | 20–6 | 29–10 | 5–3 |
| 40 | April 18 | at Missouri | Simmons Field • Columbia, Missouri | 17–3 | 30–10 | 6–3 |
| 41 | April 19 | at Missouri | Simmons Field • Columbia, Missouri | 4–0 | 31–10 | 7–3 |
| 42 | April 19 | at Missouri | Simmons Field • Columbia, Missouri | 4–0 | 32–10 | 8–3 |
| 43 | April 20 | at Missouri | Simmons Field • Columbia, Missouri | 12–1 | 33–10 | 9–3 |
| 44 | April 22 | UNLV | Allie P. Reynolds Stadium • Stillwater, Oklahoma | 8–5 | 34–10 | 9–3 |
| 45 | April 23 | UNLV | Allie P. Reynolds Stadium • Stillwater, Oklahoma | 13–6 | 35–10 | 9–3 |
| 46 | April 23 | UNLV | Allie P. Reynolds Stadium • Stillwater, Oklahoma | 5–1 | 36–10 | 9–3 |
| 47 | April 25 | Kansas | Allie P. Reynolds Stadium • Stillwater, Oklahoma | 12–2 | 37–10 | 10–3 |
| 48 | April 26 | Kansas | Allie P. Reynolds Stadium • Stillwater, Oklahoma | 10–7 | 38–10 | 11–3 |
| 49 | April 26 | Kansas | Allie P. Reynolds Stadium • Stillwater, Oklahoma | 16–3 | 39–10 | 12–3 |
| 50 | April 27 | Kansas | Allie P. Reynolds Stadium • Stillwater, Oklahoma | 13–8 | 40–10 | 13–3 |
| 51 | April 29 | at Wichita State | Eck Stadium • Wichita, Kansas | 13–3 | 41–10 | 13–3 |

May (5–2)

| # | Date | Opponent | Site/stadium | Score | Overall record | Big 8 record |
|---|---|---|---|---|---|---|
| 52 | May 1 | at Nebraska | Buck Beltzer Stadium • Lincoln, Nebraska | 2–6 | 41–11 | 13–4 |
| 53 | May 1 | at Nebraska | Buck Beltzer Stadium • Lincoln, Nebraska | 10–6 | 42–11 | 14–4 |
| 54 | May 2 | at Nebraska | Buck Beltzer Stadium • Lincoln, Nebraska | 11–12 | 42–12 | 14–5 |
| 55 | May 2 | at Nebraska | Buck Beltzer Stadium • Lincoln, Nebraska | 16–8 | 43–12 | 15–5 |
| 56 | May 9 | Iowa State | Allie P. Reynolds Stadium • Stillwater, Oklahoma | 10–5 | 44–12 | 16–5 |
| 57 | May 11 | Iowa State | Allie P. Reynolds Stadium • Stillwater, Oklahoma | 3–2 | 45–12 | 17–5 |
| 58 | May 11 | Iowa State | Allie P. Reynolds Stadium • Stillwater, Oklahoma | 13–5 | 46–12 | 18–5 |

Postseason
Big Eight Conference Tournament (4–1)

| # | Date | Opponent | Site/stadium | Score | Overall record | Big 8 record |
|---|---|---|---|---|---|---|
| 59 | May 14 | vs Nebraska | All Sports Stadium • Oklahoma City, Oklahoma | 6–0 | 47–12 | 18–5 |
| 60 | May 16 | vs Oklahoma | All Sports Stadium • Oklahoma City, Oklahoma | 5–7 | 47–13 | 18–5 |
| 61 | May 17 | vs Missouri | All Sports Stadium • Oklahoma City, Oklahoma | 6–3 | 48–13 | 18–5 |
| 62 | May 17 | vs Oklahoma | All Sports Stadium • Oklahoma City, Oklahoma | 12–7 | 49–13 | 18–5 |
| 63 | May 18 | vs Oklahoma | All Sports Stadium • Oklahoma City, Oklahoma | 9–3 | 50–13 | 18–5 |

NCAA Midwest Regional (4–0)

| # | Date | Opponent | Site/stadium | Score | Overall record | Big 8 record |
|---|---|---|---|---|---|---|
| 64 | May 22 | Richmond | Allie P. Reynolds Stadium • Stillwater, Oklahoma | 20–8 | 51–13 | 18–5 |
| 65 | May 23 | Appalachian | Allie P. Reynolds Stadium • Stillwater, Oklahoma | 23–2 | 52–13 | 18–5 |
| 66 | May 24 | Stanford | Allie P. Reynolds Stadium • Stillwater, Oklahoma | 16–8 | 53–13 | 18–5 |
| 67 | May 25 | Stanford | Allie P. Reynolds Stadium • Stillwater, Oklahoma | 3–0 | 54–13 | 18–5 |

College World Series (2–2)

| # | Date | Opponent | Site/stadium | Score | Overall record | Big 8 record |
|---|---|---|---|---|---|---|
| 68 | May 31 | vs Miami (FL) | Johnny Rosenblatt Stadium • Omaha, Nebraska | 2–6 | 54–14 | 18–5 |
| 69 | June 1 | vs Indiana State | Johnny Rosenblatt Stadium • Omaha, Nebraska | 4–0 | 55–14 | 18–5 |
| 70 | June 4 | vs Loyola Marymount | Johnny Rosenblatt Stadium • Omaha, Nebraska | 11–5 | 56–14 | 18–5 |
| 71 | June 5 | vs Florida State | Johnny Rosenblatt Stadium • Omaha, Nebraska | 5–6 | 56–15 | 18–5 |

== Awards and honors ==
Jimmy Barragan

- All-Big Eight Conference
- Third Team All-American American Baseball Coaches Association
- Second Team All-American Baseball America

Jeff Bronkey

- Big Eight Conference All-Tournament Team

Monty Fariss

- Big Eight Conference All-Tournament Team

Bryn Kosco

- Big Eight Conference All-Tournament Team

Jim Ifland

- All-Big Eight Conference
- Big Eight Conference All-Tournament Team

David Osteen

- All-Big Eight Conference

Robin Ventura

- All-Big Eight Conference
- Big Eight Conference All-Tournament Team
- Big Eight Conference Tournament MVP
- First Team All-American Baseball America
- College World Series All-Tournament Team

Rob Walton

- Big Eight Conference All-Tournament Team
