= 1986 Miami Hurricanes baseball team =

American college baseball season

1986 Miami Hurricanes baseball

NCAA Atlantic Regional champions

College World Series, 3–2
- Conference: Independent
- Record: 49–17
- Head coach: Ron Fraser (24th year)
- Home stadium: Mark Light Field

1986 NCAA Division I baseball independents standings
	Conf.				Overall
Team	W		L	PCT	W		L	PCT
UCF ‍‍‍		–		–	46	–	13	.780
No. 12 Tulane ‍‍‍^{y}		–		–	49	–	15	.766
No. 3 Miami (FL) ‍‍‍^{y}		–		–	49	–	17	.742
FIU ‍‍‍		–		–	41	–	18	.695
No. 25 Texas–Pan American ‍‍‍^{y}		–		–	42	–	19	.689
Liberty ‍‍‍		–		–	26	–	14	.650
Pace ‍‍‍		–		–	24	–	15	.615
West Chester ‍‍‍		–		–	23	–	15	.605
Southwestern Louisiana ‍‍‍		–		–	33	–	26	.559
New Orleans ‍‍‍		–		–	29	–	30	.492
United States International ‍‍‍		–		–	28	–	32	.467
New Mexico State ‍‍‍		–		–	20	–	26	.435
Northern Colorado ‍‍‍		–		–	18	–	24	.429
Tennessee State ‍‍‍		–		–	17	–	25	.405
Dayton ‍‍‍		–		–	16	–	25	.390
Manhattan ‍‍‍		–		–	9	–	17	.346
Puget Sound ‍‍‍		–		–	12	–	24	.333
Florida A&M ‍‍‍		–		–	15	–	30	.333
Boston University ‍‍‍		–		–	5	–	30	.143
y – Invited to the NCAA tournament As of June 30, 1986; Rankings from Collegiate Baseball

The 1986 Miami Hurricanes baseball team represented the University of Miami in the 1986 NCAA Division I baseball season. The Hurricanes played their home games at Mark Light Field. The team was coached by Ron Fraser in his 24th season at Miami.

The Hurricanes reached the College World Series, where they finished third after recording wins against Oklahoma State, LSU, and eventual champion Arizona and a pair of losses to eventual runner-up Florida State.

== Personnel ==
=== Roster ===
1986 Miami Hurricanes roster
Pitchers: - Dan Davies; - Mike Gibbons; - Steffen Majer; - Rick Raether; - Chris Sarmiento; - Kevin Sheary; Catchers: - Frank Dominguez; - Chris Magno	Infielders: - Rusty DeBold; - Kirk Dulom; - Chris Howard; - Joe Nelson; Outfielders: - Mike Fiore; - Rick Richardi; - Greg Vaughn; - Will Vespe	Unknown: - Brent Addison; - Tom Duffin; - Greg Ellena; - Rick Heiser; - Chris Lee; - Gus Meizoso; - John Noce; - Bob O'Brien; - Alberto Pacheco; - Pablo Perez-Allende; - Jon McNamara; - Joe Raedle; - Kevin Ryan; - Jose Trujillo; - John Viera

=== Coaches ===
1986 Miami Hurricanes baseball coaching staff
- Ron Fraser – Head coach – 24th year

== Schedule and results ==
Legend
Miami win
Miami loss

1986 Miami Hurricanes baseball game log
Regular season

February
Date	Opponent	Site/stadium	Score	Overall record
Feb 8	Texas	Mark Light Field • Coral Gables, FL	W 5–3	1–0
Feb 9	Texas	Mark Light Field • Coral Gables, FL	W 10–7	2–0
Feb 11	at South Florida	Red McEwen Field • Tampa, FL	L 2–7	2–1
Feb 12	at South Florida	Red McEwen Field • Tampa, FL	W 6–5	3–1
Feb 14	Florida	Mark Light Field • Coral Gables, FL	W 7–6	4–1
Feb 15	Florida	Mark Light Field • Coral Gables, FL	W 7–6^{10}	5–1
Feb 16	Seton Hall	Mark Light Field • Coral Gables, FL	W 5–1	6–1
Feb 17	Seton Hall	Mark Light Field • Coral Gables, FL	W 5–0	7–1
Feb 21	South Florida	Mark Light Field • Coral Gables, FL	L 4–12	7–2
Feb 22	South Florida	Mark Light Field • Coral Gables, FL	W 24–2	8–2
Feb 25	FIU	Mark Light Field • Coral Gables, FL	W 6–0	9–2
Feb 27	at FIU	Miami, FL	W 5–3^{11}	10–2
Feb 28	Florida Southern	Mark Light Field • Coral Gables, FL	W 5–4	11–2

March
Date	Opponent	Site/stadium	Score	Overall record
Mar 1	Florida Southern	Mark Light Field • Coral Gables, FL	W 9–7	12–2
Mar 4	St. Thomas	Mark Light Field • Coral Gables, FL	L 9–10	12–3
Mar 7	Maine	Mark Light Field • Coral Gables, FL	W 7–6	13–3
Mar 8	Southern Illinois	Mark Light Field • Coral Gables, FL	W 4–1	14–3
Mar 11	at Florida	Perry Field • Gainesville, FL	W 6–5	15–3
Mar 12	at Florida	Perry Field • Gainesville, FL	W 9–7	16–3
Mar 14	Southern Illinois	Mark Light Field • Coral Gables, FL	W 5–2	17–3
Mar 16	Creighton	Mark Light Field • Coral Gables, FL	W 2–1	18–3
Mar 17	Maine	Mark Light Field • Coral Gables, FL	W 2–1	19–3
Mar 18	Rutgers	Mark Light Field • Coral Gables, FL	W 7–6	20–3
Mar 19	Maine	Mark Light Field • Coral Gables, FL	W 9–3	21–3
Mar 22	Maine	Mark Light Field • Coral Gables, FL	W 6–2	22–3
Mar 23	Maine	Mark Light Field • Coral Gables, FL	L 6–8	22–4
Mar 27	Michigan State	Mark Light Field • Coral Gables, FL	L 2–3	22–5
Mar 28	Bowling Green	Mark Light Field • Coral Gables, FL	W 7–3	23–5
Mar 29	Air Force	Mark Light Field • Coral Gables, FL	W 3–0	24–5
Mar 29	Bowling Green	Mark Light Field • Coral Gables, FL	W 12–8	25–5

April
Date	Opponent	Site/stadium	Score	Overall record
Apr 1	Barry	Mark Light Field • Coral Gables, FL	W 9–1	26–5
Apr 4	vs Michigan	Hubert H. Humphrey Metrodome • Minneapolis, MN (Wheeties Tournament of Champions)	W 10–5^{7}	27–5
Apr 5	vs Panama national baseball team	Hubert H. Humphrey Metrodome • Minneapolis, MN (Wheeties Tournament of Champions)	W 8–0	
Apr 5	at Minnesota	Hubert H. Humphrey Metrodome • Minneapolis, MN (Wheeties Tournament of Champions)	L 3–7	27–6
Apr 6	vs Michigan	Hubert H. Humphrey Metrodome • Minneapolis, MN (Wheeties Tournament of Champions)	L 5–7^{10}	27–7
Apr 8	vs Alabama	Eddie Stanky Field • Mobile, AL (USA Diamond Club Classic)	W 1–0^{7}	28–7
Apr 9	at South Alabama	Eddie Stanky Field • Mobile, AL (USA Diamond Club Classic)	L 4–8	28–8
Apr 11	at Florida State	Seminole Stadium • Tallahassee, FL	L 1–6	28–9
Apr 12	at Florida State	Seminole Stadium • Tallahassee, FL	W 4–3	29–9
Apr 13	at Florida State	Seminole Stadium • Tallahassee, FL	L 3–8	29–10
Apr 16	at FIU	Miami, FL	L 8–9^{13}	29–11
Apr 17	Jacksonville	Mark Light Field • Coral Gables, FL	W 6–1	30–11
Apr 18	Jacksonville	Mark Light Field • Coral Gables, FL	W 10–3	31–11
Apr 19	Jacksonville	Mark Light Field • Coral Gables, FL	W 12–1	32–11
Apr 24	Stetson	Mark Light Field • Coral Gables, FL	W 17–6	33–11
Apr 25	Stetson	Mark Light Field • Coral Gables, FL	W 12–4	34–11
Apr 26	Stetson	Mark Light Field • Coral Gables, FL	W 9–1	35–11
Apr 29	Florida Atlantic	Mark Light Field • Coral Gables, FL	W 6–3	36–11

May
Date	Opponent	Site/stadium	Score	Overall record
May 2	Florida State	Mark Light Field • Coral Gables, FL	W 11–10	37–11
May 3	Florida State	Mark Light Field • Coral Gables, FL	L 6–14	37–12
May 4	Florida State	Mark Light Field • Coral Gables, FL	W 7–5	38–12
May 6	Tampa	Mark Light Field • Coral Gables, FL	W 8–7^{10}	39–12
May 9	vs Clemson	Greenville Municipal Stadium • Greenville, SC	W 6–5	40–12
May 10	vs Clemson	Greenville Municipal Stadium • Greenville, SC	L 4–7	40–13
May 11	vs Clemson	Greenville Municipal Stadium • Greenville, SC	L 5–9	40–14
May 12	at Maine	Mahaney Diamond • Orono, ME	W 9–6	41–14
May 13	vs Maine	The Ballpark • Old Orchard Beach, ME	L 6–9	41–15
May 14	vs Maine	The Ballpark • Old Orchard Beach, ME	W 9–1	42–15

Postseason

NCAA Atlantic Regional
Date	Opponent	Site/stadium	Score	Overall record	NCAAT record
May 23	Western Carolina	Mark Light Field • Coral Gables, FL	W 10–8	43–15	1–0
May 24	South Carolina	Mark Light Field • Coral Gables, FL	W 7–5	44–15	2–0
May 25	Georgia Tech	Mark Light Field • Coral Gables, FL	W 7–6^{10}	45–15	3–0
May 26	Georgia Tech	Mark Light Field • Coral Gables, FL	W 15–9^{10}	46–15	4–0

College World Series
Date	Opponent	Site/stadium	Score	Overall record	CWS record
May 31	Oklahoma State	Johnny Rosenblatt Stadium • Omaha, NE	W 6–2	47–15	1–0
June 3	Florida State	Johnny Rosenblatt Stadium • Omaha, NE	L 2–7	47–16	1–1
June 5	LSU	Johnny Rosenblatt Stadium • Omaha, NE	W 4–3	48–16	2–1
June 7	Arizona	Johnny Rosenblatt Stadium • Omaha, NE	W 10–2	49–16	3–1
June 8	Florida State	Johnny Rosenblatt Stadium • Omaha, NE	L 3–4	49–17	3–2
