= Wayne Rosenthal (baseball) =

American baseball player

- Pitcher
- Born: February 19, 1965 (age 61); Brooklyn, New York, U.S.
- Batted: Right Threw: Right

MLB debut
- June 26, 1991, for the Texas Rangers

Last MLB appearance
- April 14, 1992, for the Texas Rangers

MLB statistics
- Win–loss record: 1–4
- Earned run average: 5.40
- Strikeouts: 62
- Stats at Baseball Reference

Teams
- Texas Rangers (1991–1992)

Wayne Scott Rosenthal (born February 19, 1965) is an American former Major League Baseball pitcher and pitching coach.

== Early life ==
Rosenthal, who is Jewish, was born in Brooklyn, New York. He attended South Shore High School, where he played for the basketball team and the 1982 New York City champion baseball team that was 31–1. He then attended St. John's University on scholarship, where he was the top pitcher on the baseball team. He earned All-Tournament honors for the Redmen in helping them to their 1986 Big East Conference baseball tournament championship.

== Professional career ==
=== Playing career ===
He was drafted in 1986 by the Texas Rangers. After working his way through their minor league system, he pitched in parts of two seasons for the Rangers, 1991 and 1992. On August 18, 1991, he recorded the only save of his career during a 9–4 victory over the Indians. After a season with the independent Duluth–Superior Dukes, he retired as a player.

=== Post-playing career ===
In 1997, Rosenthal joined the Montreal Expos organization as the pitching coach of the minor league Cape Fear Crocs. In 2000, he served as the Expos' minor league pitching coordinator. He moved into the same position with the Florida Marlins in 2002, and on May 11, 2003 he was named Marlins' pitching coach, replacing Brad Arnsberg. He remained in that position until the end of 2004. He continued to work in the Marlins organization until 2008, including a second stint as minor league pitching coordinator which is a position he holds today.

Rosenthal currently lives in Palm Beach Gardens, Florida.
