= 1986 LSU Tigers baseball team =

American college baseball season

1986 LSU Tigers baseball

SEC Champions SEC Tournament champions NCAA South I Regional champions

College World Series, 1–2
- Conference: Southeastern Conference
- Record: 55–14 (22–5 SEC)
- Head coach: Skip Bertman (3rd year)
- Home stadium: Alex Box Stadium

1986 Southeastern Conference baseball standings
	Conf.				Overall
Team	W		L	PCT	W		L	PCT
No. 5 LSU ‍†‍‡‍^{y}	22	–	5	.815	55	–	14	.797
No. 21 Alabama ‍‍‍^{y}	18	–	9	.667	43	–	20	.683
Auburn ‍‍‍	15	–	12	.556	31	–	24	.564
Ole Miss ‍‍‍	14	–	13	.519	38	–	17	.691
Georgia ‍‍‍	14	–	13	.519	35	–	24	.593
Florida ‍‍‍	14	–	13	.519	27	–	26	.509
Mississippi State ‍‍‍	12	–	15	.444	34	–	21	.618
Tennessee ‍‍‍	10	–	17	.370	27	–	23	.540
Vanderbilt ‍‍‍	9	–	18	.333	25	–	29	.463
Kentucky ‍‍‍	7	–	20	.259	25	–	28	.472
† – Conference champion ‡ – Tournament champion y – Invited to the NCAA tournament As of June 30, 1986; Rankings from Collegiate Baseball

The 1986 LSU Tigers baseball team represented Louisiana State University in the 1986 NCAA Division I baseball season. The Tigers played their home games at Alex Box Stadium, and played as part of the Southeastern Conference. The team was coached by Skip Bertman in his third season as head coach at LSU.

The Tigers reached the College World Series, their first appearance in Omaha, where they finished tied for 5th place after a win against Maine and losses to Loyola Marymount and eventual third-place finisher Miami (FL).

== Personnel ==
=== Roster ===
1986 LSU Tigers roster
Pitchers: 2 - Greg Naquin - Sophomore; 18 - Corey Gomez - Freshman; 19 - Greg Fontenot - Junior; 20 - Scott Boudreaux - Junior; 21 - Stan Loewer - Junior; 30 - Gregg Patterson - Sophomore; 32 - Randy LaRose - Junior; 35 - Joe Zimmerman - Junior; 36 - Dan Kite - Freshman; 39 - Barry Manuel - Sophomore; 40 - Willie Forbes - Junior; 44 - Mark Guthrie - Junior	Catchers: 9 - Alan Galy - Freshman; 14 - Rob Leary - Senior; 17 - Tim Beamon - Freshman; 51 - Craig Faulkner - Junior; Outfielders: 5 - Eric Johnson - Junior; 8 - Joey Belle - Sophomore; 10 - Michael Papajohn - Junior; 12 - Terry Belle - Sophomore; 13 - Brad Duplantis - Sophomore; 23 - Rob Hartwig - Junior; 28 - Willie Prevost - Freshman; 45 - Todd Waggoner - Freshman; 37 - Jack Voigt - Sophomore	Infielders: 1 - Burke Broussard - Senior; 3 - Wayne Stofsky - Freshman; 4 - Andy Galy - Sophomore; 7 - Jeff Reboulet - Senior; 24 - Darrin Bartel - Junior; 27 - Pete Bush - Freshman; 29 - Troy Bourque - Freshman; 31 - Jeff Yurtin - Senior; 33 - Jim Bowie - Junior

=== Coaches ===
1986 LSU Tigers baseball coaching staff
- Skip Bertman - Head coach - 3rd Season
- Tom Brown - Assistant coach - 3rd season
- Smoke Laval - Assistant coach - 3rd Season
- Cliff Dees - Graduate Assistant Coach
- Mike Jenkins - Graduate Assistant Coach

== Schedule and results ==
Legend
LSU win
LSU loss

1986 LSU Tigers baseball game log
Regular season

February
Date	Opponent	Site/Stadium	Score	Overall Record	SEC Record
Feb 18	Louisiana College*	Alex Box Stadium • Baton Rouge, LA	W 8–0	1–0	
Feb 19	New Orleans*	Alex Box Stadium • Baton Rouge, LA	W 3–2	2–0	
Feb 22	Arkansas*	Alex Box Stadium • Baton Rouge, LA	W 8–7	3–0	
Feb 23	Arkansas*	Alex Box Stadium • Baton Rouge, LA	L 6–7	3–1	
Feb 24	Southwestern Louisiana*	Alex Box Stadium • Baton Rouge, LA	W 4–0	4–1	
Feb 26	vs Southeastern Louisiana*	North Park • Denham Springs, LA	W 17–4	5–1	

March
Date	Opponent	Site/Stadium	Score	Overall Record	SEC Record
Mar 1	at Florida	Perry Field • Gainesville, FL	W 9–1^{7}	6–1	1–0
Mar 1	at Florida*	Perry Field • Gainesville, FL	W 18–4^{7}	7–1	2–0
Mar 2	at Florida*	Perry Field • Gainesville, FL	W 12–5	8–1	3–0
Mar 4	Northeast Louisiana*	Alex Box Stadium • Baton Rouge, LA	W 14–6	9–1	
Mar 6	Tulane*	Alex Box Stadium • Baton Rouge, LA	W 12–1	10–1	
Mar 8	Kentucky	Alex Box Stadium • Baton Rouge, LA	W 8–7^{7}	11–1	4–0
Mar 8	Kentucky	Alex Box Stadium • Baton Rouge, LA	W 5–1^{7}	12–1	5–0
Mar 9	Kentucky	Alex Box Stadium • Baton Rouge, LA	W 12–10	13–1	6–0
Mar 11	Southeastern Louisiana*	Alex Box Stadium • Baton Rouge, LA	W 15–3	14–1	
Mar 14	Kansas State*	Alex Box Stadium • Baton Rouge, LA	W 8–4	15–1	
Mar 15	Missouri*	Alex Box Stadium • Baton Rouge, LA	W 5–1	16–1	
Mar 18	Southern*	Alex Box Stadium • Baton Rouge, LA	W 7–5	17–1	
Mar 18	New Orleans*	Alex Box Stadium • Baton Rouge, LA	W 9–8	18–1	
Mar 19	at Southwestern Louisiana*	Moore Family Field • Lafayette, LA	W 5–4^{11}	19–1	
Mar 22	at Alabama	Sewell–Thomas Stadium • Tuscaloosa, AL	W 6–5^{10}	20–1	7–0
Mar 23	at Alabama	Sewell–Thomas Stadium • Tuscaloosa, AL	W 8–6	21–1	8–0
Mar 23	at Alabama	Sewell–Thomas Stadium • Tuscaloosa, AL	L 4–5	21–2	8–1
Mar 25	at Northeast Louisiana*	Lou St. Amant Field • Monroe, LA	W 13–5	22–2	
Mar 26	at Centenary*	Centenary Park • Shreveport, LA	W 9–5	23–2	
Mar 27	at Stephen F. Austin*	Jaycees Field • Nacogdoches, TX	W 10–7	24–2	
Mar 29	Tennessee	Alex Box Stadium • Baton Rouge, LA	W 3–2^{11}	25–2	9–1
Mar 29	Tennessee	Alex Box Stadium • Baton Rouge, LA	W 3–2^{7}	26–2	10–1
Mar 30	Tennessee	Alex Box Stadium • Baton Rouge, LA	W 12–5	27–2	11–1

April
Date	Opponent	Site/Stadium	Score	Overall Record	SEC Record
Apr 2	at Nicholls State*	Ben Meyer Diamond at Ray E. Didier Field • Thibodaux, LA	W 8–3^{7}	28–2	
Apr 2	at Nicholls State*	Ben Meyer Diamond at Ray E. Didier Field • Thibodaux, LA	L 1–2^{7}	28–3	
Apr 3	at Northwestern State*	H. Alvin Brown–C. C. Stroud Field • Natchitoches, LA	W 24–0^{7}	29–3	
Apr 5	Ole Miss	Alex Box Stadium • Baton Rouge, LA	W 9–6^{7}	30–3	12–1
Apr 5	Ole Miss	Alex Box Stadium • Baton Rouge, LA	L 3–6^{7}	30–4	12–2
Apr 6	Ole Miss	Alex Box Stadium • Baton Rouge, LA	W 10–1	31–4	13–2
Apr 8	Louisiana Tech*	Alex Box Stadium • Baton Rouge, LA	W 4–3	32–4	
Apr 9	Nicholls State*	Alex Box Stadium • Baton Rouge, LA	W 16–4	33–4	
Apr 12	at Mississippi State	Dudy Noble Field • Starkville, MS	W 4–0^{7}	34–4	14–2
Apr 12	at Mississippi State	Dudy Noble Field • Starkville, MS	W 4–0^{7}	35–4	15–2
Apr 13	at Mississippi State	Dudy Noble Field • Starkville, MS	L 5–6	35–5	15–3
Apr 15	Southwestern Louisiana*	Alex Box Stadium • Baton Rouge, LA	W 5–4	36–5	
Apr 16	at New Orleans*	Privateer Park • New Orleans, LA	L 2–8	36–6	
Apr 19	Georgia	Alex Box Stadium • Baton Rouge, LA	W 3–1^{7}	37–6	16–3
Apr 19	Georgia	Alex Box Stadium • Baton Rouge, LA	L 8–11^{11}	37–7	16–4
Apr 20	Georgia	Alex Box Stadium • Baton Rouge, LA	W 11–8	38–7	17–4
Apr 23	Southern*	Alex Box Stadium • Baton Rouge, LA	W 18–5^{7}	39–7	
Apr 24	at Tulane*	Tulane Diamond • New Orleans, LA	W 6–5	40–7	
Apr 26	at Vanderbilt	McGugin Field • Nashville, TN	W 14–4^{7}	41–7	18–4
Apr 26	at Vanderbilt	McGugin Field • Nashville, TN	W 7–5^{7}	42–7	19–4
Apr 27	at Vanderbilt	McGugin Field • Nashville, TN	L 4–6	42–8	19–5
Apr 29	at New Orleans*	Privateer Park • New Orleans, LA	L 1–7	42–9	
Apr 30	Centenary*	Alex Box Stadium • Baton Rouge, LA	W 12–3	43–9	

May
Date	Opponent	Site/Stadium	Score	Overall Record	SEC Record
May 3	Auburn	Alex Box Stadium • Baton Rouge, LA	W 7–1^{7}	44–9	20–5
May 3	Auburn	Alex Box Stadium • Baton Rouge, LA	W 12–3^{7}	45–9	21–5
May 4	Auburn	Alex Box Stadium • Baton Rouge, LA	W 4–3	46–9	22–5

Postseason

SEC Tournament
Date	Opponent	Seed	Site/Stadium	Score	Overall Record	SECT Record
May 9	(4) Georgia	(1)	Alex Box Stadium • Baton Rouge, LA	W 10–6	47–9	1–0
May 10	(2) Alabama	(1)	Alex Box Stadium • Baton Rouge, LA	W 10–7	48–9	2–0
May 11	(4) Georgia	(1)	Alex Box Stadium • Baton Rouge, LA	W 8–4	49–9	3–0

May
Date	Opponent	Site/Stadium	Score	Overall Record
May 17	Alabama	Alex Box Stadium • Baton Rouge, LA	L 1–5^{7}	49–10
May 17	Alabama	Alex Box Stadium • Baton Rouge, LA	W 4–2^{7}	50–10
May 18	Alabama	Alex Box Stadium • Baton Rouge, LA	L 2–8	50–11
May 19	at Florida State	Seminole Stadium • Tallahassee, FL	L 4–6	50–12

NCAA South I Regional
Date	Opponent	Seed	Site/Stadium	Score	Overall Record	Reg Record
May 22	Jackson State	Alex Box Stadium • Baton Rouge, LA	W 14–11	51–12	1–0	
May 23	Oklahoma	Alex Box Stadium • Baton Rouge, LA	W 8–5	52–12	2–0	
May 24	Louisiana Tech	Alex Box Stadium • Baton Rouge, LA	W 7–4	53–12	3–0	
May 25	Tulane	Alex Box Stadium • Baton Rouge, LA	W 7–6	54–12	4–0	

College World Series
Date	Opponent	Site/Stadium	Score	Overall Record	CWS Record
May 30	Loyola Marymount	Johnny Rosenblatt Stadium • Omaha, NE	L 3–4	54–13	0–1
June 1	Maine	Johnny Rosenblatt Stadium • Omaha, NE	W 8–4	55–13	1–1
June 2	Miami (FL)	Johnny Rosenblatt Stadium • Omaha, NE	L 3–4	55–14	1–2
