= Paul Sorrento =

American baseball player and coach (born 1965)

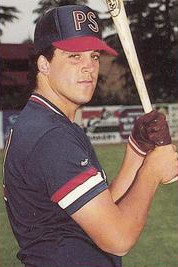
- Sorrento with the Palm Springs Angels in 1988
- First baseman
- Born: November 17, 1965 (age 60); Somerville, Massachusetts, U.S.
- Batted: Left Threw: Right

MLB debut
- September 8, 1989, for the Minnesota Twins

Last MLB appearance
- October 2, 1999, for the Tampa Bay Devil Rays

MLB statistics
- Batting average: .257
- Home runs: 166
- Runs batted in: 565
- Stats at Baseball Reference

Teams
- Minnesota Twins (1989–1991); Cleveland Indians (1992–1995); Seattle Mariners (1996–1997); Tampa Bay Devil Rays (1998–1999)

Career highlights and awards
- World Series champion (1991)

Paul Anthony Sorrento (born November 17, 1965) is an American former professional baseball first baseman. From 1989 through 1999, Sorrento played in Major League Baseball (MLB) for the Minnesota Twins, Cleveland Indians, Seattle Mariners and Tampa Bay Devil Rays. He previously served as the hitting instructor in the Los Angeles Angels coaching staff.

== Amateur career ==
Sorrento played high school baseball for St. John's Preparatory School in Danvers, Massachusetts (1979–1983). Sorrento played college baseball for the Florida State University Seminoles under head coach Mike Martin. In 1985, he played collegiate summer baseball with the Harwich Mariners of the Cape Cod Baseball League.

On June 2, 1986, Sorrento was drafted by the California Angels in the 4th round of the 1986 MLB draft.

== Professional career ==
In an 11-season career, Sorrento posted a .257 batting average with 166 home runs and 565 RBI in 1093 games played. In 11 playoff game appearances with the Minnesota Twins, Cleveland Indians and Seattle Mariners, he had a .213 batting average with 1 home run and 2 RBIs in 47 at-bats.

Sorrento played in two World Series, one for the Twins in 1991 and one for the Indians, in 1995. On April 6, 1992, Sorrento recorded the first hit during the regular season at Oriole Park at Camden Yards.

== Coaching career ==
On January 13, 2012, Sorrento was named hitting coach for Inland Empire 66ers of the California League; a Class A-Advanced affiliate of the Los Angeles Angels of Anaheim. On November 9, 2012, he was named the minor league hitting coordinator for the Los Angeles Angels of Anaheim organization. On November 3, 2015, Sorrento was hired as the Angels assistant hitting coach. On February 16, 2023, Sorrento was named as a player development staff coach in the Angels organization.

== See also ==
- List of athletes on Wheaties boxes
