= Bien Figueroa =

Dominican baseball player (born 1964)

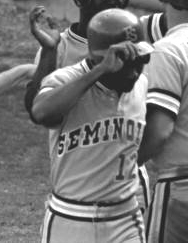
- Figueroa with Florida State in 1985
- Shortstop / Second baseman
- Born: February 7, 1964 (age 62); Santo Domingo, Dominican Republic
- Batted: Right Threw: Right

MLB debut
- May 17, 1992, for the St. Louis Cardinals

Last MLB appearance
- October 4, 1992, for the St. Louis Cardinals

MLB statistics
- Batting average: .182
- Home runs: 0
- Runs batted in: 4

CPBL statistics
- Batting average: .436
- Home runs: 0
- Runs batted in: 4
- Stats at Baseball Reference

Teams
- St. Louis Cardinals (1992); Uni-President Lions (1995)

Career highlights and awards
- Taiwan Series champion (1995)

Bienvenido Figueroa DeLeon (born February 7, 1964) is a Dominican former professional baseball player. Figueroa played for the St. Louis Cardinals of Major League Baseball (MLB) in 1992.

== Career ==
Figueroa spent 1986 through 1991 in the St. Louis Cardinals minor league affiliates before making his major league debut on May 17, 1992. His last MLB appearance was on October 4, 1992, and spent 1993 and 1994 in the minor leagues with the Cardinals and Montreal Expos organizations. In 1995 after being released by the Texas Rangers organization, Figueroa joined the Uni-President Lions of the Chinese Professional Baseball League and won the Taiwan Series. Figueroa split the 1996 season between the Colorado Rockies and Baltimore Orioles organizations and the Diablos Rojos del Mexico of the Mexican League.

He later managed in the minor leagues with the Bluefield Orioles, Delmarva Shorebirds, Frederick Keys, Bowie Baysox, and the Connecticut Defenders.

== Personal life ==
Figueroa's son, Cole, played in MLB and is currently in the Tampa Bay Rays front office.
