= Monty Fariss =

American baseball player (born 1967)

- Outfielder
- Born: October 13, 1967 (age 58); Cordell, Oklahoma, U.S.
- Batted: Right Threw: Right

MLB debut
- September 6, 1991, for the Texas Rangers

Last MLB appearance
- June 1, 1993, for the Florida Marlins

MLB statistics
- Batting average: .217
- Home runs: 4
- Runs batted in: 29
- Stats at Baseball Reference

Teams
- Texas Rangers (1991–1992); Florida Marlins (1993)

Monty Ted Fariss (born October 13, 1967) is an American former professional baseball player who spent time in the Major League Baseball (MLB) as an outfielder from 1991 to 1993.

== Career ==
Fariss attended Oklahoma State, and in 1987 he played collegiate summer baseball with the Hyannis Mets of the Cape Cod Baseball League. He was selected in the first round of the 1988 MLB draft by the Texas Rangers.

Fariss made his first MLB appearance in 1991, and in his two years as a Ranger he had 197 at bats. In 1993, he was signed by the Florida Marlins and played in 18 games for the club.
