= Tim McIntosh (baseball) =

American baseball player

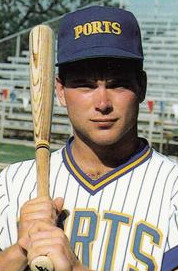
- McIntosh in 1988
- Catcher / Outfielder
- Born: March 21, 1965 (age 60); Minneapolis, Minnesota, U.S.
- Batted: Right Threw: Right

Professional debut
- MLB: September 3, 1990, for the Milwaukee Brewers
- NPB: April 1, 1995, for the Nippon Ham Fighters

Last appearance
- NPB: June 22, 1995, for the Nippon Ham Fighters
- MLB: June 12, 1996, for the New York Yankees

MLB statistics
- Batting average: .179
- Home runs: 2
- Runs batted in: 10

NPB statistics
- Batting average: .220
- Home runs: 3
- Runs batted in: 15
- Stats at Baseball Reference

Teams
- Milwaukee Brewers (1990–1993); Montreal Expos (1993); Nippon Ham Fighters (1995); New York Yankees (1996)

Timothy Allen McIntosh (born March 21, 1965) is an American former professional baseball player. He played parts of five seasons in Major League Baseball (MLB) between 1990 and 1996, mostly as a catcher and outfielder. He also played one season for the Nippon Ham Fighters of the Nippon Professional Baseball (NPB) in 1995.

In 1986, McIntosh played collegiate summer baseball for the Chatham A's of the Cape Cod Baseball League (CCBL). He led the league in batting with a .392 average, and in 2017 was inducted into the CCBL Hall of Fame.
