= Mike Senne =

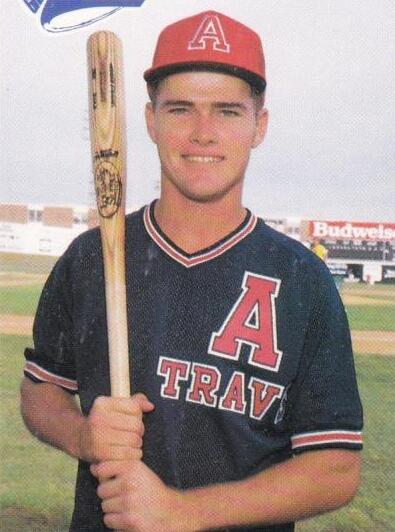
- Senne with the Arkansas Travelers c. 1988
- Outfielder
- Born: June 5, 1964 (age 60); United States
- Bats: Right Throws: Right

Career highlights and awards
- College World Series Most Outstanding Player (1986)

Michael D. Senne (born June 5, 1964) is a former baseball outfielder who is most notable for winning the 1986 College World Series Most Outstanding Player award while a senior at the University of Arizona. He is one of three players from the University of Arizona to win that award. The others are Steve Powers and Terry Francona.

With the University of Arizona, he was a letter winner in both 1985 and 1986.

Following his collegiate career, he played professionally, although he never made it to Major League Baseball. He was drafted by the St. Louis Cardinals in the 14th round of the 1986 amateur draft, and began his professional career with the Johnson City Cardinals that year. In 206 at-bats, he hit .282 with 6 home runs, 38 RBI and 21 stolen bases.

With the St. Petersburg Cardinals in 1987, Senne batted .261 with 10 home runs, 82 RBI and 16 stolen bases. He split the 1988 season between St. Petersburg and the Arkansas Travelers, hitting .273 with 6 home runs, 23 stolen bases and 58 RBI in 458 at-bats. In 44 at-bats with the Travelers, he hit .159.

In 1989, Senne wound up in the San Francisco Giants organization. He played for the Shreveport Captains, hitting .286 in 91 at-bats with the Captains.

Overall, Senne hit .269 with 23 home runs, 194 RBI and 61 stolen bases in four minor league seasons.
