= 1986 NCAA Division I baseball rankings =

1986 NCAA Division I baseball season

Tournament

College World Series
- Champions: Arizona
- Runners-up: Florida State
- MOP: Mike Senne (Arizona)

Seasons
- ← 1985 1987 →

The following polls make up the 1986 NCAA Division I baseball rankings. Baseball America began publishing its poll of the top 20 teams in college baseball in 1981. Beginning with the 1985 season, it expanded to the top 25. Collegiate Baseball Newspaper published its first human poll of the top 20 teams in college baseball in 1957, and expanded to rank the top 30 teams in 1961.

== Baseball America ==
Currently, only the final poll from the 1986 season is available.

Rank	Team
1	Arizona
2	Florida State
3	Miami (FL)
4	Oklahoma State
5	LSU
6	Loyola Marymount
7	Texas
8	UCLA
9	UC Santa Barbara
10	South Florida
11	Texas A&M
12	Stanford
13	Tulane
14	Pepperdine
15	Indiana State
16	Michigan
17	Oklahoma
18	Georgia Tech
19	Arkansas
20	Maine
21	Oregon State
22	Central Michigan
23	UNLV
24	San Diego
25	Alabama

== Collegiate Baseball ==
Currently, only the final poll from the 1986 season is available.

Rank	Team
1	Arizona
2	Florida State
3	Miami (FL)
4	Oklahoma State
5	LSU
6	Loyola Marymount
7	Indiana State
8	Maine
9	South Florida
10	Hawaii
11	UC Santa Barbara
12	Tulane
13	UCLA
14	Pepperdine
15	Stanford
16	Texas
17	Georgia Tech
18	Texas A&M
19	Louisiana Tech
20	Central Michigan
21	Alabama
22	Oklahoma
23	Oregon State
24	Arkansas
25	Texas–Pan American
26	San Diego State
27	Oral Roberts
28	Michigan
29	NC State
30	St. John's (NY)
