= 1986 NCAA Division I baseball tournament =

- Season: 1986
- Teams: 40
- Finals site: Johnny Rosenblatt Stadium; Omaha, NE
- Champions: Arizona (3rd title)
- Runner-up: Florida State (8th CWS Appearance)
- Winning coach: Jerry Kindall (3rd title)
- MOP: Mike Senne (Arizona)

The 1986 NCAA Division I baseball tournament was played at the end of the 1986 NCAA Division I baseball season to determine the national champion of college baseball. The tournament concluded with eight teams competing in the College World Series, a double-elimination tournament in its fortieth year. Eight regional competitions were held to determine the participants in the final event. Four regions held a four team, double-elimination tournament while the remaining four regions included six teams, resulting in 40 teams participating in the tournament at the conclusion of their regular season, and in some cases, after a conference tournament. The fortieth tournament's champion was Arizona, coached by Jerry Kindall. The Most Outstanding Player was Mike Senne of Arizona.

== National seeds ==
Bold indicates CWS participant.

- **Florida State**
- **LSU**
- **Miami (FL)**
- Texas
- UCLA

== Regionals ==
The opening rounds of the tournament were played across eight regional sites across the country, four consisting of four teams and four of six teams. The winners of each Regional advanced to the College World Series.

Bold indicates winner.

=== Atlantic Regional at Coral Gables, FL ===
First round
1 | **Georgia Tech** | **9**^{14}
6 | Navy | 8
2 | **South Carolina** | **5**
5 | Alabama | 3
3 | **Miami (FL)** | **10**
4 | Western Carolina | 8

Second round
**Georgia Tech** | **8**^{11}
Western Carolina | 7
South Carolina | 5
**Miami (FL)** | **7**
Navy | 1
**Alabama** | **4**

Third round
Georgia Tech | 6
**Miami (FL)** | **7**^{10}
South Carolina | 7
**Alabama** | **8**

Semifinals
**Georgia Tech** | **12**
Alabama | 6

Final
**Miami (FL)** | **15** | —
Georgia Tech | 9 | —

=== Central Regional at Austin, TX ===
First round
1 | **Pepperdine** | **11**
6 | Texas–Pan American | 0
2 | **Arizona** | **26**
5 | San Diego State | 5
3 | **Texas** | **21**
4 | Southern Illinois | 7

Second round
**Pepperdine** | **5**
Southern Illinois | 3
**Arizona** | **9**
Texas | 3
**Texas–Pan American** | **10**
San Diego State | 6

Third round
Pepperdine | 6
**Arizona** | **10**
**Texas** | **9**
Texas–Pan American | 5

Semifinals
**Pepperdine** | **2**^{10}
Texas | 0

Final
**Arizona** | **5** | —
Pepperdine | 3 | —

=== Mideast Regional at Ann Arbor, MI ===
Upper round 1
**Indiana State** | **7**
Michigan | 1
**Central Michigan** | **7**
Oral Roberts | 2
Lower round 1
Michigan | 4
**Oral Roberts** | **5**

Upper final
**Indiana State** | **5**
Central Michigan | 2
Lower final
**Central Michigan** | **6**
Oral Roberts | 2

Final
**Indiana State** | **7**^{11} | —
Central Michigan | 6 | —

=== Midwest Regional at Stillwater, OK ===
First round
1 | **Oklahoma State** | **20**
6 | Richmond | 8
2 | **Arkansas** | **4**
5 | Oregon State | 3
3 | **Stanford** | **11**
4 | Appalachian State | 1

Second round
**Oklahoma State** | **23**
Appalachian State | 2
Arkansas | 0
**Stanford** | **2**
Richmond | 1
**Oregon State** | **7**

Third round
**Oklahoma State** | **16**
Stanford | 8
Arkansas | 0
**Oregon State** | **1**

Semifinals
**Stanford** | **10**
Oregon State | 7

Final
**Oklahoma State** | **3** | —
Stanford | 0 | —

=== Northeast Regional at Orono, ME ===
Upper round 1
**St. John's** | **8**
Rider | 2
**Maine** | **5**
Rutgers | 1
Lower round 1
**Rider** | **9**
Rutgers | 4

Upper final
St. John's | 7
**Maine** | **13**
Lower final
**St. John's** | **16**
Rider | 3

Final
**Maine** | **21** | —
St. John's | 8 | —

=== South I Regional at Baton Rouge, LA ===
First round
1 | **Louisiana Tech** | **7**
6 | Tulane | 5
2 | **Oklahoma** | **21**
5 | Eastern Kentucky | 14
3 | **LSU** | **14**
4 | Jackson State | 11

Second round
**Louisiana Tech** | **14**
Jackson State | 6
Oklahoma | 5
**LSU** | **8**
**Tulane** | **16**
Eastern Kentucky | 6

Third round
Louisiana Tech | 4
**LSU** | **7**
Oklahoma | 5
**Tulane** | **14**

Semifinals
Louisiana Tech | 4
**Tulane** | **9**

Final
**LSU** | **7** | —
Tulane | 6 | —

=== South II Regional at Tallahassee, FL ===
Upper round 1
**Texas A&M** | **10**
South Florida | 2
**Florida State** | **10**
NC State | 6
Lower round 1
**South Florida** | **12**
NC State | 4

Upper final
Texas A&M | 9
**Florida State** | **12**
Lower final
**South Florida** | **10**
Texas A&M | 7

Final
**Florida State** | **11** | —
South Florida | 7 | —

=== West Regional at Los Angeles, CA ===
Upper round 1
**UC Santa Barbara** | **11**^{10}
Loyola Marymount | 5
**Hawaii** | **6**
UCLA | 3
Lower round 1
**Loyola Marymount** | **12**
UCLA | 10

Upper final
UC Santa Barbara | 6
**Hawaii** | **8**
Lower final
UC Santa Barbara | 6
**Loyola Marymount** | **14**^{11}

Final
Hawaii | 6 | 5
**Loyola Marymount** | **10** | **12**

== College World Series ==
=== Participants ===
| School | Conference | Record (conference) | Head coach | CWS appearances | CWS best finish | CWS record |
|---|---|---|---|---|---|---|
| Arizona | Pac-10 | 45–18 (18–12) | Jerry Kindall | 13 (last: 1985) | 1st (1976, 1980) | 27–24 |
| Florida State | Metro | 57–11 (4–1) | Mike Martin | 7 (last: 1980) | 2nd (1970) | 8–14 |
| Indiana State | MVC | 48–19 (10–10) | Bob Warn | 0 (last: none) | none | 0–0 |
| Loyola Marymount | WCC | 49–13 (n/a) | Dave Snow | 0 (last: none) | none | 0–0 |
| LSU | SEC | 54–12 (22–5) | Skip Bertman | 0 (last: none) | none | 0–0 |
| Maine | Eastern Collegiate | 41–21 (13–1) | John Winkin | 6 (last: 1984) | 3rd (1964, 1982) | 7–12 |
| Miami (FL) | n/a | 46–15 (n/a) | Ron Fraser | 8 (last: 1985) | 1st (1982, 1985) | 19–13 |
| Oklahoma State | Big 8 | 54–13 (18–5) | Gary Ward | 13 (last: 1985) | 1st (1959) | 28–25 |

=== Results ===
==== Bracket ====
Upper round 1
**Loyola Marymount** | **4**
LSU | 3
**Arizona** | **8**
Maine | 7
**Miami (FL)** | **6**
Oklahoma State | 2
**Florida State** | **5**
Indiana State | 3

Upper round 2
Loyola Marymount | 5
**Arizona** | **7**
Miami (FL) | 2
**Florida State** | **7**
Lower round 1
**LSU** | **8**
Maine | 4
**Oklahoma State** | **4**
Indiana State | 0

Upper final
**Arizona** | **9**
Florida State | 5
Lower round 2
**Miami (FL)** | **4**
LSU | 3
Loyola Marymount | 5
**Oklahoma State** | **11**

Semifinals
Arizona | 2
**Miami (FL)** | **4**
**Florida State** | **6**
Oklahoma State | 5

Preliminary final
Miami (FL) | 3
**Florida State** | **4**

Final
**Arizona** | **10**
Florida State | 2

==== Game results ====
| Date | Game | Winner | Score | Loser | Notes |
|---|---|---|---|---|---|
| May 30 | Game 1 | Loyola Marymount | 4–3 | LSU | |
| May 30 | Game 2 | Arizona | 8–7 | Maine | |
| May 31 | Game 3 | Miami (FL) | 6–2 | Oklahoma State | |
| May 31 | Game 4 | Florida State | 5–3 | Indiana State | |
| June 1 | Game 5 | LSU | 8–4 | Maine | Maine eliminated |
| June 1 | Game 6 | Oklahoma State | 4–0 | Indiana State | Indiana State eliminated |
| June 2 | Game 7 | Arizona | 7–5 | Loyola Marymount | |
| June 3 | Game 8 | Florida State | 7–2 | Miami (FL) | |
| June 4 | Game 9 | Oklahoma State | 11–5 | Loyola Marymount | Loyola Marymount eliminated |
| June 5 | Game 10 | Miami (FL) | 4–3 | LSU | LSU eliminated |
| June 6 | Game 11 | Arizona | 9–5 | Florida State | Arizona qualified for final |
| June 7 | Game 12 | Florida State | 6–5 | Oklahoma State | Oklahoma State eliminated |
| June 7 | Game 13 | Miami (FL) | 4–2 | Arizona | |
| June 8 | Game 14 | Florida State | 4–3 | Miami (FL) | Miami (FL) eliminated |
| June 9 | Final | Arizona | 10–2 | Florida State | Arizona wins CWS |

=== All-Tournament Team ===
The following players were members of the All-Tournament Team.

| Position | Player | School |
|---|---|---|
| P | Gary Alexander | Arizona |
| P | Richie Lewis | Florida State |
| C | Bill Reynolds | Maine |
| 1B | Todd Trafton | Arizona |
| 2B | Luis Alicea | Florida State |
| 3B | Robin Ventura | Oklahoma State |
| SS | Bien Figueroa | Florida State |
| OF | Mike Fiore | Miami (FL) |
| OF | **Mike Senne (MOP)** | Arizona |
| OF | Paul Sorrento | Florida State |
| DH | Gary Alexander | Arizona |

=== Notable players ===
- Arizona: Chip Hale, Gil Heredia, Tommy Hinzo
- Florida State: Luis Alicea, Bien Figueroa, Richie Lewis, Mike Loynd, Paul Sorrento
- Indiana State: Mike Gardiner
- Loyola Marymount: Chris Donnels, Billy Bean, Tim Layana
- LSU: Albert Belle, Jeff Yurtin, Jim Bowie, Mark Guthrie, Barry Manuel, Jeff Reboulet, Jack Voigt
- Maine: Mike Bordick, Jeff Plympton
- Miami (FL): Chris Howard, Greg Vaughn
- Oklahoma State: Jeff Bronkey, Gordon Dillard, Monty Fariss, Tim Pugh, Robin Ventura, Scott Wilkinson

== Tournament notes ==
- In the Central Regional Arizona sets a tournament record scoring 26 runs in the first game.

== See also ==
- 1986 NCAA Division I softball tournament
- 1986 NCAA Division II baseball tournament
- 1986 NCAA Division III baseball tournament
- 1986 NAIA World Series
