= Dick Cooke =

American baseball player and coach

Biographical details
- Born: October 28, 1956 (age 70); Point Pleasant, New Jersey, U.S.

Playing career
- 1975–1978: Richmond
- Position: P

Coaching career (HC unless noted)
- 1984–1988: Richmond (Asst.)
- 1989–1990: Belmont Abbey
- 1991–2018: Davidson

Head coaching record
- Overall: 595–837–1

Dick Cooke (born October 28, 1956) is an American former college baseball coach, who served primarily as the head coach of the Davidson Wildcats baseball program. He was named to that position prior to the 1991 season, and is the winningest and longest-serving baseball coach in school history.

== Playing career ==
Cooke played at Richmond, earning three varsity letters as a left-handed pitcher. After graduating with a degree in journalism in 1978, he spent three years in the Boston Red Sox organization at class-A, appearing in 85 games with a 2.95 ERA.

== Coaching career ==
A few years after ending his playing career, Cooke accepted a position as assistant coach at Richmond, where he remained for five seasons. He departed to become assistant athletic director and head baseball coach at Belmont Abbey in 1989, where he re-instituted the baseball program that had been discontinued at the varsity level 17 years earlier. After two years with the Crusaders, he accepted the head coaching position at Davidson. In his time with the Wildcats, ten players have been selected in the Major League Baseball draft. Cooke has also worked with USA Baseball, serving as an auxiliary coach at the 2000 Olympic Games and 2008 Olympic Games. In the summer of 2012, Cooke was named chairman of the NCAA Baseball Rules Committee. Just a month later, the car Cooke was driving was struck by another vehicle, leaving him with serious head injuries. After the 2013 season, Cooke was honored with the CollegeBaseballInsider.com's Tom Walter Inspiration Award. Cooke resigned following the 2018 season.

== Head coaching record ==
The table below lists Cooke's record as a head coach at the Division I level.

Record table
Season	Team	Overall	Conference	Standing	Postseason
Davidson (Big South Conference) (1991–1992)
1991	Davidson	23–29	10–8	3rd	
1992	Davidson	28–25	10–6	2nd	
Davidson (Big South):		51–54	20–14		
Davidson (Southern Conference) (1993–2014)
1993	Davidson	20–28	11–9	5th	SoCon tournament (Note: The top eight finishers of the SoCon's nine teams qualified for the tournament in 1993.)
1994	Davidson	20–31	12–2	8th	SoCon tournament (Note: The top eight finishers of the SoCon's nine teams qualified for the tournament in 1994.)
1995	Davidson	19–32	10–14	4th	SoCon tournament (Note: The top eight finishers of the SoCon's nine teams qualified for the tournament in 1995.)
1996	Davidson	16–33	6–18	8th	SoCon tournament (Note: The top eight finishers of the SoCon's nine teams qualified for the tournament in 1996.)
1997	Davidson	18–34	8–15	6th	SoCon tournament (Note: The top eight finishers of the SoCon's nine teams qualified for the tournament in 1997.)
1998	Davidson	13–38	8–16	7th	SoCon tournament (Note: The top eight finishers of the SoCon's ten teams qualified for the tournament in 1998.)
1999	Davidson	11–37–1	9–21	10th	
2000	Davidson	26–28	14–15	7th	SoCon tournament (Note: The top eight finishers of the SoCon's eleven teams qualified for the tournament in 2000.)
2001	Davidson	19–32	10–20	10th	
2002	Davidson	21–29	13–16	T-8th	SoCon tournament (Note: The top eight finishers of the SoCon's ten teams qualified for the tournament in 2002.)
2003	Davidson	18–27	12–17	8th	SoCon tournament (Note: The top eight finishers of the SoCon's ten teams qualified for the tournament in 2003.)
2004	Davidson	20–33	13–17	7th	SoCon tournament (Note: The top eight finishers of the SoCon's ten teams qualified for the tournament in 2004.)
2005	Davidson	26–24	13–17	9th	
2006	Davidson	18–33	6–21	9th	SoCon tournament (Note: All ten of the SoCon's teams qualified for the tournament in 2006.)
2007	Davidson	19–34	9–18	10th	SoCon tournament (Note: All ten of the SoCon's teams qualified for the tournament in 2007.)
2008	Davidson	12–38	4–23	10th	SoCon tournament (Note: All ten of the SoCon's teams qualified for the tournament in 2008.)
2009	Davidson	18–31	11–16	7th	SoCon tournament (Note: The top eight finishers of the SoCon's eleven teams qualified for the tournament in 2009.)
2010	Davidson	19–32	5–25	11th	
2011	Davidson	18–30	8–21	10th	
2012	Davidson	22–32	8–22	11th	
2013	Davidson	18–31	12–18	9th	
2014	Davidson	29–19	17–8	2nd	SoCon tournament (Note: All ten of the SoCon's teams qualified for the tournament in 2014.)
SoCon:		420–686–1	219–369		
Davidson (Atlantic-10 Conference) (2015–2018)
2015	Davidson	28–22	14–10	T-4th	A-10 tournament
2016	Davidson	28–26	11–12	7th	A-10 tournament
2017	Davidson	35–26	13–11	6th	NCAA Super Regional
2018	Davidson	33–21	14–10	5th	A-10 tournament
A-10:		124–74	52–43		
Total:		595–837–1			
National champion Postseason invitational champion Conference regular season champion Conference regular season and conference tournament champion Division regular season champion Division regular season and conference tournament champion Conference tournament champion

== See also ==
- Career statistics from Baseball Reference (Minors)
