= The Citadel Bulldogs baseball, 1990–1999 =

American college baseball seasons

The Citadel Bulldogs baseball teams represented The Citadel, The Military College of South Carolina in Charleston, South Carolina, United States. The program was established in 1899, and has continuously fielded a team since 1947. Their primary rivals are College of Charleston, Furman and VMI.

== 1991 ==
1991 The Citadel Bulldogs baseball
- Conference: Southern Conference
- Record: 34–19–1 (16–2 SoCon)
- Head coach: Chal Port (27th season)
- Home stadium: College Park

1991 Southern Conference baseball standings
	Conf.				Overall
Team	W		L	PCT	W		L	PCT
The Citadel ‍†‍‍	16	–	2	.889	34	–	19	.642
Western Carolina ‍‍‍	11	–	3	.786	36	–	26	.581
Marshall ‍‍‍	9	–	7	.563	16	–	26	.381
Furman ‍‍‡‍^{y}	6	–	5	.545	26	–	26	.500
Appalachian State ‍‍‍	5	–	8	.385	28	–	21	.571
East Tennessee State ‍‍‍	5	–	13	.278	23	–	29	.442
VMI ‍‍‍	1	–	15	.063	2	–	35	.054
† – Conference champion ‡ – SoCon Tournament champion y – Invited to the NCAA tournament As of June 30, 1991; Rankings from Collegiate Baseball

=== Roster ===
1991 The Citadel Bulldogs roster
Pitchers: - Steve Basch - Sophomore; - Ken Britt - Junior; - Gettys Glaze - Junior; - Eddie Graham; - John Harrison - Freshman; - Hal Hayden - Sophomore; - Robbie Kirven; - Hank Kraft - Junior; - Kevin McGarvey - Sophomore; - Jermaine Shuler - Freshman; - Brad Stowell - Senior	Catchers Infielders: - Chris Lemonis - (redshirt) Sophomore; - Dan McDonnell - Junior; - Tony Skole - Junior	Outfielders	Unknown: - Cornell Caldwell; - Oberdan Congello - Freshman; - Vic Correll - Sophomore; - John Cribb - Freshman; - Gettys Glaze - Junior; - Billy Hutto - Sophomore; - Jay Jones; - Kirk McMillan - Sophomore; - Derrick Rogers - Sophomore; - Jason Rychlick - Senior; - Phillip Tobin - Senior

=== Coaches ===
1991 The Citadel Bulldogs baseball coaching staff
- Chal Port - Head coach - 27th year

=== Schedule ===
1991 The Citadel Bulldogs baseball game log
Regular season

February
Date	Opponent	Site/stadium	Score	Win	Loss	Save	Overall record	SoCon Record
Feb 9	vs South Carolina State*	Pirate Field • Savannah, GA	W 15–2	Basch	Huff	None	1–0	
Feb 10	vs NC State*	Pirate Field • Savannah, GA	L 1–2^{15}	Shingledecker	Kraft	None	1–1	
Feb 10	at Armstrong State*	Pirate Field • Savannah, GA	L 2–3	Goodwin	Britt	Schmidt	1–2	
Feb 16	vs UAB*	Claude Smith Field • Macon, GA	L 6–10	Hurtt	Basch	None	1–3	
Feb 17	at Mercer*	Claude Smith Field • Macon, GA	L 2–9	Wright	Britt	None	1–4	
Feb 20	Gannon*	College Park • Charleston, SC	W 6–0	Stowell	Slater	None	2–4	
Feb 21	Gannon*	College Park • Charleston, SC	L 1–2	Ramfos	Hayden	Pederson	2–5	
Feb 22	vs Vanderbilt*	Pirate Field • Savannah, GA	L 1–8	Sadecki	Britt	None	2–6	
Feb 23	St. Andrews*	College Park • Charleston, SC	W 6–5	Kraft	Chlebus	None	3–6	
Feb 23	St. Andrews*	College Park • Charleston, SC	L 3–4	Whitson	Cribb	Gogol	3–7	
Feb 24	vs Wake Forest*	Pirate Field • Savannah, GA	L 6–8	Buddie	Glaze	Jenkins	3–8	
Feb 25	Campbell*	College Park • Charleston, SC	W 16–3	Shuler	Schouten	None	4–8	
Feb 27	at College of Charleston*		W 8–7	Kraft	Thomas	None	5–8	

March
Date	Opponent	Site/stadium	Score	Win	Loss	Save	Overall record	SoCon Record
Mar 2	Norfolk State*	College Park • Charleston, SC	W 7–6	Kraft	Snyder	None	6–8	
Mar 4	Mount Olive*	College Park • Charleston, SC	L 5–6	Tuten	Cribb	None	6–9	
Mar 5	Mount Olive*	College Park • Charleston, SC	W 4–1	Britt	Brewer	Kraft	7–9	
Mar 7	at Coastal Carolina*	Charles Watson Stadium • Conway, SC	W 6–4	Shuler	Davis	Kraft	8–9	
Mar 9	Appalachian State	College Park • Charleston, SC	W 9–2	Basch	Smith	None	9–9	1–0
Mar 9	Appalachian State	College Park • Charleston, SC	W 14–1	Stowell	Wagoner	None	10–9	2–0
Mar 10	Appalachian State	College Park • Charleston, SC	W 6–1	Britt	Wills	None	11–9	3–0
Mar 12	at Charleston Southern*	CSU Ballpark • North Charleston, SC	W 5–1	Harrison	Ducker	None	12–9	
Mar 16	at Furman	Latham Baseball Stadium • Greenville, SC	L 1–4	Ertel	Britt	None	12–10	3–1
Mar 16	at Furman	Latham Baseball Stadium • Greenville, SC	W 2–1	Basch	Hartley	Kraft	13–10	4–1
Mar 17	at Furman	Latham Baseball Stadium • Greenville, SC	W 8–3	Stowell	Braswell	Glaze	14–10	5–1
Mar 19	at Campbell*	Taylor Field • Buies Creek, NC	T 6–6	None			14–10–1	
Mar 20	Howard*	College Park • Charleston, SC	W 8–4	Harrison	Magbie	None	15–10–1	
Mar 22	at Augusta*	Augusta, GA	L 5–7	Cianciola	Shuler	None	15–11–1	
Mar 23	College of Charleston*	College Park • Charleston, SC	W 3–2	Kraft	Timmerman	None	16–11–1	
Mar 24	USC Aiken*	College Park • Charleston, SC	W 6–5	Glaze	Crimminger	None	17–11–1	
Mar 25	at USC Aiken*	Roberto Hernandez Stadium • Aiken, SC	W 5–3	Stowelll	Borski	Kraft	18–11–1	
Mar 26	at Clemson*	Beautiful Tiger Field • Clemson, SC	L 0–10	Jersild	Shuler	None	18–12–1	
Mar 27	at Clemson*	Beautiful Tiger Field • Clemson, SC	L 3–12	Holtz	Cribb	None	18–13–1	
Mar 29	East Tennessee State	College Park • Charleston, SC	W 1–0	Britt	Havens	None	19–13–1	6–1
Mar 29	East Tennessee State	College Park • Charleston, SC	W 2–0	Basch	Clark	Kraft	20–13–1	7–1
Mar 30	East Tennessee State	College Park • Charleston, SC	W 4–1	Stowell	Rinehart	Kraft	21–13–1	8–1

April
Date	Opponent	Site/stadium	Score	Win	Loss	Save	Overall record	SoCon Record
Apr 1	at Jacksonville*	John Sessions Stadium • Jacksonville, FL	L 7–10	Milite	McGarvey	None	21–14–1	
Apr 2	at Armstrong State*	Pirate Field • Savannah, GA	W 6–5	Britt	Goodwin	Kraft	22–14–1	
Apr 3	Charleston Southern*	College Park • Charleston, SC	W 10–0	Basch	Maas	None	23–14–1	
Apr 6	at VMI	Patchin Field • Lexington, VA	W 5–1	Stowell	Doczi	None	24–14–1	9–1
Apr 6	at VMI	Patchin Field • Lexington, VA	W 9–0	Britt	Tavenner	None	25–14–1	10–1
Apr 7	at VMI	Patchin Field • Lexington, VA	W 8–3	Basch	Phillips	Glaze	26–14–1	11–1
Apr 9	South Carolina*	College Park • Charleston, SC	L 6–11	Hardwick	Cribb	Lewis	26–15–1	
Apr 11	Coastal Carolina*	College Park • Charleston, SC	W 8–5	Cribb	Hanrahan	Kraft	27–15–1	
Apr 13	Marshall	College Park • Charleston, SC	W 4–0	Stowell	Bellomy	None	28–15–1	12–1
Apr 13	Marshall	College Park • Charleston, SC	W 8–0	Britt	Craig	None	29–15–1	13–1
Apr 14	Marshall	College Park • Charleston, SC	W 5–4	Kraft	Bennett	None	30–15–1	14–1
Apr 16	Armstrong State*	College Park • Charleston, SC	W 4–1	McGarvey	Ewing	Glaze	31–15–1	
Apr 17	Jacksonville*	College Park • Charleston, SC	L 5–6	Milite	Kraft	None	31–16–1	
Apr 20	at Western Carolina	Hennon Stadium • Cullowhee, NC	L 4–10	Grundy	Stowell	None	31–17–1	14–2
Apr 20	at Western Carolina	Hennon Stadium • Cullowhee, NC	W 8–6	Britt	Kendrick	Glaze	32–17–1	15–2
Apr 21	at Western Carolina	Hennon Stadium • Cullowhee, NC	W 9–5	Basch	Kimel	None	33–17–1	16–2
Apr 22	at South Carolina*	Sarge Frye Field • Columbia, SC	W 3–1	Shuler	Baker	Kraft	34–17–1	

Postseason

SoCon Tournament
Date	Opponent	Site/stadium	Score	Win	Loss	Save	Overall record	SoConT Record
Apr 26	Appalachian State	College Park • Charleston, SC	L 0–2	Wills	Britt	McAulay	34–18–1	0–1
Apr 27	Western Carolina	College Park • Charleston, SC	L 3–7	Grundy	Basch	None	34–19–1	0–2

== 1992 ==
1992 The Citadel Bulldogs baseball
- Conference: Southern Conference
- Record: 35–20 (10–9 SoCon)
- Head coach: Fred Jordan (1st season)
- Home stadium: College Park

1992 Southern Conference baseball standings
	Conf.				Overall
Team	W		L	PCT	W		L	PCT
No. 17 Western Carolina ^{†‡y} ‍‍‍	17	–	4	.810	44	–	21	.677
Georgia Southern ‍‍‍	15	–	6	.714	31	–	27	.534
East Tennessee State ‍‍‍	11	–	8	.579	31	–	20	.608
The Citadel ‍‍‍	10	–	9	.526	35	–	20	.636
Furman ‍‍‍	11	–	10	.524	21	–	31	.404
Appalachian State ‍‍‍	6	–	14	.300	17	–	34	.333
Marshall ‍‍‍	5	–	13	.278	15	–	26	.366
VMI ‍‍‍	4	–	15	.211	11	–	39	.220
† – Conference champion ‡ – SoCon Tournament champion y – Invited to the NCAA tournament As of June 30, 1992; Rankings from Collegiate Baseball

=== Roster ===
1992 The Citadel Bulldogs roster
Pitchers: - Steve Basch - Junior; - Ken Britt - Senior; - Cory DeGroote; - Gettys Glaze - Senior; - Eddie Graham; - John Harrison - Sophomore; - Hal Hayden - Junior; - Jon Hinkle - Freshman; - Norman Howard - Freshman; - Hank Kraft - Senior; - Kevin McGarvey - Junior; - Jermaine Shuler - Sophomore	Catchers Infielders: - Chris Lemonis - (redshirt) Junior; - Dan McDonnell - Senior; - Tony Skole - Senior	Outfielders	Unknown: - Donny Burks; - Cornell Caldwell; - Dana Catchpole; - Oberdan Congello - Sophomore; - Cam Cooper; - Vic Correll - Junior; - John Cribb - Sophomore; - Scott Elvington - Junior; - Gettys Glaze - Senior; - Billy Hutto - Junior; - Robbie Kirven; - Hank Kraft; - Kirk McMillan - Junior; - Matt Merrill; - Donald Morillo - Freshman; - Nick Peterson; - Derrick Rogers - Junior; - Steve Savage - Freshman

=== Coaches ===
1992 The Citadel Bulldogs baseball coaching staff
- Fred Jordan - Head coach - 1st

=== Schedule ===
1992 The Citadel Bulldogs baseball game log
Regular season

February
Date	Opponent	Site/stadium	Score	Win	Loss	Save	Overall record	SoCon Record
Feb 12	at Coastal Carolina*	Charles Watson Stadium • Conway, SC	L 3–9	Kunder	Britt	None	0–1	
Feb 14	at USC Aiken*	Roberto Hernandez Stadium • Aiken, SC	L 10–15	McCollum	Basch	Lee	0–2	
Feb 15	vs Winthrop*	Roberto Hernandez Stadium • Aiken, SC	W 4–2	Basch	McDonald	Kraft	1–2	
Feb 15	vs Furman*	Roberto Hernandez Stadium • Aiken, SC	L 3–4	Braswell	Kraft	None	1–3	
Feb 19	at Pembroke State*	Sammy Cox Field • Pembroke, NC	W 17–3	Howard	Dutch	None	2–3	
Feb 21	Pembroke State*	College Park • Charleston, SC	W 3–2^{12}	Glaze	Sellers	None	3–3	
Feb 22	vs South Carolina State*	Pirate Field • Savannah, GA	W 10–9	McGarvey	Neal	Glaze	4–3	
Feb 23	vs Vanderbilt*	Pirate Field • Savannah, GA	W 3–1	Britt	McGill	'Kraft '	5–3	
Feb 23	at Armstrong State*	Pirate Field • Savannah, GA	L 1–3	Goodwin	Shuler	Garza	5–4	
Feb 25	Gannon*	College Park • Charleston, SC	W 13–6	McGarvey	DeBonis	None	6–4	
Feb 26	Gannon*	College Park • Charleston, SC	W 13–7	Harrison	Shubert	Kraft	7–4	
Feb 27	Mount St. Mary's*	College Park • Charleston, SC	W 22–1	Shuler	Sheehan	None	8–4	
Feb 29	James Madison*	College Park • Charleston, SC	W 15–0	Glaze	Mitchell	None	9–4	

March
Date	Opponent	Site/stadium	Score	Win	Loss	Save	Overall record	SoCon Record
Mar 1	James Madison*	College Park • Charleston, SC	L 2–5	Woody	Basch	Croushore	9–5	
Mar 2	at College of Charleston*		L 3–8	Foxhall	Britt	None	9–6	
Mar 3	Mount Olive*	College Park • Charleston, SC	W 1–0	Howard	Stroud	Kraft	10–6	
Mar 4	Mount Olive*	College Park • Charleston, SC	W 9–5	Harrison	Jones	None	11–6	
Mar 7	Furman	College Park • Charleston, SC	W 3–0	Britt	Spears	Kraft	12–6	1–0
Mar 7	Furman	College Park • Charleston, SC	L 0–3	Murphy	Basch	None	12–7	1–1
Mar 8	Furman	College Park • Charleston, SC	W 9–1	Glaze	Braswell	None	13–7	2–1
Mar 9	Norfolk State*	College Park • Charleston, SC	W 7–2	Howard	Hurt	None	14–7	
Mar 11	Christian Brothers*	College Park • Charleston, SC	W 6–4	Shuler	Shmolda	Kraft	15–7	
Mar 12	Christian Brothers*	College Park • Charleston, SC	L 3–4	Laney	Harrison	None	15–8	
Mar 14	at Georgia Southern*	J. I. Clements Stadium • Statesboro, GA	L 1–2	Carragher	Britt	None	15–9	2–2
Mar 14	at Georgia Southern*	J. I. Clements Stadium • Statesboro, GA	L 0–3	Greene	Basch	None	15–10	2–3
Mar 15	at Georgia Southern*	J. I. Clements Stadium • Statesboro, GA	L 3–11	Roth	Glaze	None	15–11	2–4
Mar 19	at Charleston Southern*	CSU Ballpark • North Charleston, SC	W 6–5	Howard	Maas	Kraft	16–11	
Mar 21	at East Tennessee State	Thomas Stadium • Johnson City, TN	L 1–4	Rinehart	Britt	None	16–12	2–5
Mar 21	at East Tennessee State	Thomas Stadium • Johnson City, TN	L 3–4	Heidel	Basch	None	16–13	2–6
Mar 23	at Wofford*	Duncan Park • Spartanburg, SC	W 17–7	Glaze	Lancaster	None	17–13	
Mar 24	Allegheny*	College Park • Charleston, SC	W 5–2	Shuler	Madigan	Kraft	18–13	
Mar 25	Howard*	College Park • Charleston, SC	W 4–2	Hinkle	Gorham	Kraft	19–13	
Mar 26	Howard*	College Park • Charleston, SC	W 15–0	Morillo	Carter	None	20–13	
Mar 28	VMI	College Park • Charleston, SC	W 4–1	Britt	Goodrich	None	21–13	3–6
Mar 28	VMI	College Park • Charleston, SC	W 4–1	Basch	Schenk	Kraft	22–13	4–6
Mar 29	VMI	College Park • Charleston, SC	W 9–0	Glaze	Payne	None	23–13	5–6
Mar 31	Armstrong State*	College Park • Charleston, SC	W 5–4	Shuler	Williams	None	24–13	

April
Date	Opponent	Site/stadium	Score	Win	Loss	Save	Overall record	SoCon Record
Apr 2	at South Carolina*	Sarge Frye Field • Columbia, SC	L 5–32	Stoops	Howard	None	24–14	
Apr 5	at Marshall	Kennedy Center Field • Huntington, WV	W 6–0	Britt	Bennett	None	25–14	6–6
Apr 5	at Marshall	Kennedy Center Field • Huntington, WV	W 3–0	Glaze	Spade	None	26–14	7–6
Apr 7	Coastal Carolina*	College Park • Charleston, SC	W 12–3	Basch	Wilson	None	27–14	
Apr 9	South Carolina*	College Park • Charleston, SC	L 0–1	Stoops	Shuler	Mosser	27–15	
Apr 11	Western Carolina	College Park • Charleston, SC	W 2–1	Britt	Grundy	Kraft	28–15	8–6
Apr 11	Western Carolina	College Park • Charleston, SC	W 1–0	Glaze	Kimel	None	29–15	9–6
Apr 12	Western Carolina	College Park • Charleston, SC	L 7–8	Kendrick	Kraft	Kyslinger	29–16	9–7
Apr 14	College of Charleston*	College Park • Charleston, SC	W 7–1	Shuler	Foxhall	None	30–16	
Apr 15	Charleston Southern*	College Park • Charleston, SC	W 11–8	Howard	Miller	Morillo	31–16	
Apr 17	at Appalachian State*	Boone, NC	L 4–5	Vullo	Britt	Davis	31–17	9–8
Apr 17	at Appalachian State*	Boone, NC	W 6–0	Glaze	Wills	None	32–17	10–8
Apr 18	at Appalachian State*	Boone, NC	L 6–9	Bronack	Kraft	None	32–18	10–9

Postseason

SoCon Tournament
Date	Opponent	Site/stadium	Score	Win	Loss	Save	Overall record	SoConT Record
Apr 23	Furman	College Park • Charleston, SC	W 6–4	Kraft	Spears	None	33–18	1–0
Apr 24	Western Carolina	College Park • Charleston, SC	L 1–2	Grundy	Glaze	None	33–19	1–1
Apr 25	Appalachian State	College Park • Charleston, SC	W 12–3	Basch	Vullo	Harrison	34–19	2–1
Apr 25	East Tennessee State	College Park • Charleston, SC	W 9–4	Shuler	Heidel	Kraft	35–19	3–1
Apr 26	Georgia Southern	College Park • Charleston, SC	L 0–9	Greene	Britt	None	35–20	3–2

== 1993 ==
1993 The Citadel Bulldogs baseball
- Conference: Southern Conference
- Record: 32–25 (13–9 SoCon)
- Head coach: Fred Jordan (2nd season)
- Home stadium: College Park

1993 Southern Conference baseball standings
	Conf.				Overall
Team	W		L	PCT	W		L	PCT
Georgia Southern ‍†‍‍	18	–	5	.783	38	–	21	.644
Western Carolina ‍‍‡‍^{y}	15	–	6	.714	34	–	28	.548
The Citadel ‍‍‍	13	–	9	.591	32	–	25	.561
East Tennessee State ‍‍‍	11	–	8	.579	21	–	17	.553
Davidson ‍‍‍	11	–	9	.550	20	–	28	.417
Appalachian State ‍‍‍	8	–	12	.400	15	–	27	.357
Marshall ‍‍‍	9	–	14	.391	13	–	27	.325
VMI ‍‍‍	5	–	15	.250	20	–	29	.408
Furman ‍‍‍	4	–	16	.200	17	–	22	.436
† – Conference champion ‡ – SoCon Tournament champion y – Invited to the NCAA tournament As of June 30, 1993; Rankings from Collegiate Baseball

=== Roster ===
1993 The Citadel Bulldogs roster
Pitchers: - Steve Basch - Senior; - Doug Bridges; - Brian Callahan - Freshman; - Hal Chafey; - John Harrison - Junior; - Hal Hayden - Senior; - Jon Hinkle - Sophomore; - Norman Howard - Sophomore; - John Price - Freshman; - Britt Reames - Freshman; - Jermaine Shuler - Junior; - Larry Smith	Catchers Infielders: - Chris Lemonis - (redshirt) Senior	Outfielders	Unknown: - David Beckley - Freshman; - Donny Burks; - Oberdan Congello - Junior; - Cam Cooper; - Vic Correll - Senior; - John Cribb - Junior; - Dan Crosby; - Scott Elvington - Senior; - Jon Hinkle; - Billy Hutto - Senior; - Hank Kraft; - Kirk McMillan - Senior; - Matt Merrill; - Donald Morillo - Sophomore; - Derrick Rogers - Senior; - Steve Savage - Sophomore; - Dale Sistare

=== Coaches ===
1993 The Citadel Bulldogs baseball coaching staff
- Fred Jordan - Head coach - 2nd year

=== Schedule ===
1993 The Citadel Bulldogs baseball game log
Regular season

February
Date	Opponent	Site/stadium	Score	Win	Loss	Save	Overall record	SoCon Record
Feb 13	at Armstrong State*	Pirate Field • Savannah, GA	L 9–10	Chumley	Shuler	None	0–1	
Feb 14	vs Howard*	Pirate Field • Savannah, GA	W 20–0	Callahan	DuPlessis	None	1–1	
Feb 14	vs South Carolina State*	Pirate Field • Savannah, GA	W 9–0	Basch	Neal	None	2–1	
Feb 18	at Coastal Carolina*	Charles Watson Stadium • Conway, SC	L 5–7	Herndon	Howard	Kunder	2–2	
Feb 19	vs Charlotte*	Roberto Hernandez Stadium • Aiken, SC	W 8–5	Basch	Summey	Price	3–2	
Feb 20	at USC Aiken*	Roberto Hernandez Stadium • Aiken, SC	L 8–9^{10}	Lee	Harrison	None	3–3	
Feb 22	UNC Greensboro*	College Park • Charleston, SC	L 8–9	Posey	Hinkle	None	3–4	
Feb 23	at Winthrop*	Winthrop Ballpark • Rock Hill, SC	L 2–5	Rehkow	Callahan	Myers	3–5	
Feb 24	Pembroke State*	College Park • Charleston, SC	W 8–1	Howard	Ridenour	None	4–5	
Feb 27	Western Carolina	College Park • Charleston, SC	L 2–12	Grundy	Basch	None	4–6	0–1
Feb 27	Western Carolina	College Park • Charleston, SC	L 7–8	Sellers	Harrison	Manning	4–7	0–2
Feb 28	Western Carolina	College Park • Charleston, SC	W 7–5	Shuler	Hearrell	Harrison	5–7	1–2

March
Date	Opponent	Site/stadium	Score	Win	Loss	Save	Overall record	SoCon Record
Mar 2	Mount St. Mary's*	College Park • Charleston, SC	L 4–6	MiMaio	Callahan	McPherson	5–8	
Mar 4	UNC Wilmington*	College Park • Charleston, SC	W 7–6^{12}	Morillo	Rogers	None	6–8	
Mar 6	Appalachian State	College Park • Charleston, SC	W 3–2	Shuler	Davis	Reames	7–8	2–2
Mar 6	Appalachian State	College Park • Charleston, SC	W 9–0	Basch	Armstrong	None	8–8	3–2
Mar 7	Appalachian State	College Park • Charleston, SC	W 7–4	Cribb	Vullo	Harrison	9–8	4–2
Mar 8	Winthrop*	College Park • Charleston, SC	W 4–0	Price	Harmon	None	10–8	
Mar 9	at South Carolina*	Sarge Frye Field • Columbia, SC	W 12–5	Morillo	Maynard	None	11–8	
Mar 11	Norfolk State*	College Park • Charleston, SC	W 7–4	Callahan	Hale	Hinkle	12–8	
Mar 14	Wofford*	College Park • Charleston, SC	W 8–0	Shuler	Sanders	None	13–8	
Mar 14	Wofford*	College Park • Charleston, SC	L 1–3	Cash	Basch	Parler	13–9	
Mar 16	South Carolina*	College Park • Charleston, SC	L 0–7	Threehouse	Hinkle	None	13–10	
Mar 18	Stetson*	College Park • Charleston, SC	L 9–11	Beale	Hinkle	None	13–11	
Mar 19	at UNC Greensboro*	Greensboro, NC	L 5–6	Greene	Harrison	None	13–12	
Mar 20	at Davidson	T. Henry Wilson Jr. Field • Davidson, NC	L 5–10	Spaw	Shuler	None	13–13	4–3
Mar 20	at Davidson	T. Henry Wilson Jr. Field • Davidson, NC	W 8–4	Basch	Cole	None	14–13	5–3
Mar 21	at Davidson	T. Henry Wilson Jr. Field • Davidson, NC	W 9–6	Cribb	Ariail	None	15–13	6–3
Mar 22	at Campbell*	Taylor Field • Buies Creek, NC	W 7–6	Hinkle	Payton	Morillo	16–13	
Mar 27	at East Tennessee State	Thomas Stadium • Johnson City, TN	L 1–4	Maxwell	Shuler	Anderson	16–14	6–4
Mar 30	at Charleston Southern*	CSU Ballpark • North Charleston, SC	W 5–3	Morillo	Hayes	Harrison	17–14	

April
Date	Opponent	Site/stadium	Score	Win	Loss	Save	Overall record	SoCon Record
Apr 1	at Pembroke State*	Sammy Cox Field • Pembroke, NC	W 9–7	Callahan	March	Hinkle	18–14	
Apr 3	Furman	College Park • Charleston, SC	W 10–3	Price	Braswell	None	19–14	7–4
Apr 3	Furman	College Park • Charleston, SC	W 2–1^{10}	Hinkle	Ertel	None	20–14	8–4
Apr 4	Furman	College Park • Charleston, SC	W 5–3	Harrison	Spears	Hinkle	21–14	9–4
Apr 6	at Armstrong State*	Pirate Field • Savannah, GA	W 15–8	Howard	Spangler	None	22–14	
Apr 8	at UNC Wilmington*	Brooks Field • Wilmington, NC	L 3–7	Smith	Callahan	None	22–15	
Apr 10	at Georgia Southern	J. I. Clements Stadium • Statesboro, GA	L 0–3	Fair	Price	None	22–16	9–5
Apr 10	at Georgia Southern	J. I. Clements Stadium • Statesboro, GA	L 1–5	Stanford	Basch	Thornton	22–17	9–6
Apr 11	at Georgia Southern	J. I. Clements Stadium • Statesboro, GA	L 4–8	Masi	Cribb	None	22–18	9–7
Apr 12	South Carolina State*	College Park • Charleston, SC	W 11–2	Callahan	Neal	None	23–18	
Apr 14	College of Charleston*	College Park • Charleston, SC	L 1–7	Vandell	Shuler	None	23–19	
Apr 15	Campbell*	College Park • Charleston, SC	W 6–2	Howard	Lee	None	24–19	
Apr 17	at Marshall	Kennedy Center Field • Huntington, WV	W 3–0	Price	Spade	None	25–19	10–7
Apr 17	at Marshall	Kennedy Center Field • Huntington, WV	L 2–3	Paugh	Basch	None	25–20	10–8
Apr 18	at Marshall	Kennedy Center Field • Huntington, WV	L 7–8	Diamond	Morillo	None	25–21	10–9
Apr 20	Armstrong State*	College Park • Charleston, SC	W 7–5	Reames	Spangler	None	26–21	
Apr 21	Coastal Carolina*	College Park • Charleston, SC	L 3–11	Brummitt	Callahan	None	26–22	
Apr 22	at South Carolina State*	Orangeburg, SC	W 20–2	Hayden	Givens	None	27–22	
Apr 24	VMI	College Park • Charleston, SC	W 3–2	Reames	Hazelwood	None	28–22	11–9
Apr 24	VMI	College Park • Charleston, SC	W 2–0	Basch	Payne	None	29–22	12–9
Apr 25	VMI	College Park • Charleston, SC	W 3–2	Howard	Phillips	Morillo	30–22	13–9
Apr 26	at College of Charleston*		W 2–1	Callahan	Euart	Reames	31–22	
Apr 27	Charleston Southern*	College Park • Charleston, SC	L 5–6^{11}	Hayes	Hinkle	None	31–23	

Postseason

SoCon Tournament
Date	Opponent	Site/stadium	Score	Win	Loss	Save	Overall record	SoConT Record
Apr 29	Appalachian State	College Park • Charleston, SC	W 7–1	Basch	Musgrave	None	32–23	1–0
Apr 30	Western Carolina	College Park • Charleston, SC	L 3–6	Grundy	Howard	None	32–24	1–1
May 1	Georgia Southern	College Park • Charleston, SC	L 6–9	Stanford	Price	Thornton	32–25	1–2

== 1994 ==
1994 The Citadel Bulldogs baseball

SoCon tournament champion

NCAA East Regional, 1–2
- Conference: Southern Conference
- Record: 32–34 (11–13 SoCon)
- Head coach: Fred Jordan (3rd season)
- Home stadium: College Park

1994 Southern Conference baseball standings
	Conf.				Overall
Team	W		L	PCT	W		L	PCT
Western Carolina ‍†‍‍^{y}	19	–	4	.826	45	–	18	.714
Georgia Southern ‍‍‍	15	–	7	.682	31	–	25	.554
Marshall ‍‍‍	12	–	9	.571	23	–	20	.535
East Tennessee State ‍‍‍	12	–	11	.522	19	–	21	.475
The Citadel ‍‍‡‍^{y}	11	–	13	.458	32	–	34	.485
Appalachian State ‍‍‍	10	–	13	.435	22	–	26	.458
VMI ‍‍‍	10	–	13	.435	21	–	29	.420
Davidson ‍‍‍	10	–	14	.417	20	–	31	.392
Furman ‍‍‍	4	–	19	.174	9	–	35	.205
† – Conference champion ‡ – SoCon Tournament champion y – Invited to the NCAA tournament As of June 30, 1994; Rankings from Collegiate Baseball

=== Roster ===
1994 The Citadel Bulldogs roster
Pitchers: - Brian Callahan - Sophomore; - Jon Hinkle - Junior; - Norman Howard - Junior; - Joe Isaac; - Scott Mullen - Freshman; - John Price - Sophomore; - Britt Reames - Sophomore; - Chris Sica - Freshman; - Owen Richardson -‘’Freshman’’	Catchers Infielders: - David Beckley - Sophomore; - Bo Betchman - Freshman; - Jermaine Shuler - Senior; - Ryan Butler - Freshman	Outfielders: - Garrick Haltiwanger	Unknown: - Kurt Beerman - Freshman; - Oberdan Congello - Senior; - Cam Cooper; - John Cribb - Senior; - Dan Crosbyc; - Jon Hinkle; - Rusty Hughes; - Ken Lott; - Donald Morillo - Junior; - W. C. Rains; - Steve Savage - Junior; - Dale Sistare

=== Coaches ===
1994 The Citadel Bulldogs baseball coaching staff
- Fred Jordan - Head coach - 3rd year
- Dan McDonnell - Assistant coach - 1st year

=== Schedule ===
1994 The Citadel Bulldogs baseball game log
Regular season

February
Date	Opponent	Site/stadium	Score	Win	Loss	Save	Overall record	SoCon Record
Feb 4	vs North Carolina*	Grayson Stadium • Savannah, GA (Great Savannah Shootout)	L 1–3	Murphy	Price	Chrismon	0–1	
Feb 5	vs Georgia State*	Grayson Stadium • Savannah, GA (Great Savannah Shootout)	W 8–4	Callahan	Corsi	None	1–1	
Feb 12	Charlotte*	College Park • Charleston, SC	W 3–1	Howard	Collie	Morillo	2–1	
Feb 13	Charlotte*	College Park • Charleston, SC	L 5–8	Shelton	Price	None	2–2	
Feb 16	South Carolina*	College Park • Charleston, SC	L 0–8	Haynie	Reames	None	2–3	
Feb 18	Kentucky*	College Park • Charleston, SC	W 4–2	Morillo	Reed	None	3–3	
Feb 19	Kentucky*	College Park • Charleston, SC	L 4–5^{10}	Whitney	Hinkle	None	3–4	
Feb 20	Kentucky*	College Park • Charleston, SC	L 2–11	Camp	Mullen	None	3–5	
Feb 22	at South Carolina*	Sarge Frye Field • Columbia, SC	L 2–15	Haynie	Morillo	None	3–6	
Feb 26	at Western Carolina	Hennon Stadium • Cullowhee, NC	L 1–7	Beverlin	Howard	None	3–7	0–1
Feb 26	at Western Carolina	Hennon Stadium • Cullowhee, NC	L 2–3	Cockrell	Reames	Manning	3–8	0–2
Feb 27	at Western Carolina	Hennon Stadium • Cullowhee, NC	L 2–3	Rexrode	Callahan	Manning	3–9	0–3

March
Date	Opponent	Site/stadium	Score	Win	Loss	Save	Overall record	SoCon Record
Mar 3	at Coastal Carolina*	Charles Watson Stadium • Conway, SC	L 10–12	Higgs	Morillo	Covell	3–10	
Mar 5	at Appalachian State	Boone, NC	W 6–2	Reames	Davis	Morillo	4–10	1–3
Mar 5	at Appalachian State	Boone, NC	L 6–7	Scholtz	Morillo	None	4–11	1–4
Mar 6	at Appalachian State	Boone, NC	W 5–4	Price	Russell	None	5–11	2–4
Mar 7	James Madison*	College Park • Charleston, SC	L 4–6	McNichol	Mullen	Cook	5–12	
Mar 8	Winthrop*	College Park • Charleston, SC	L 2–4	Abbott	Morillo	Myers	5–13	
Mar 9	UNC Greensboro*	College Park • Charleston, SC	L 7–8	Greene	Price	Pick	5–14	
Mar 10	UNC Greensboro*	College Park • Charleston, SC	L 7–11^{12}	Pick	Howard	None	5–15	
Mar 12	Princeton*	College Park • Charleston, SC	L 5–6	Volpp	Price	Kahney	5–16	
Mar 12	Princeton*	College Park • Charleston, SC	L 2–5	Kahney	Mullen	None	5–17	
Mar 13	Princeton*	College Park • Charleston, SC	W 4–3	Callahan	Looney	Morillo	6–17	
Mar 14	College of Charleston*	College Park • Charleston, SC	W 8–4	Reames	Vandell	None	7–17	
Mar 17	Liberty*	College Park • Charleston, SC	W 6–2	Isaac	Brown	Morillo	8–17	
Mar 19	Davidson	College Park • Charleston, SC	W 15–4	Reames	Pollard	None	9–17	3–4
Mar 19	Davidson	College Park • Charleston, SC	W 6–2	Callahan	Hall	None	10–17	4–4
Mar 20	Davidson	College Park • Charleston, SC	L 2–4	Andrews	Isaac	Chapman	10–18	4–5
Mar 23	South Carolina*	College Park • Charleston, SC	W 3–2	Mullen	Stoops	Hinkle	11–18	
Mar 24	Brown*	College Park • Charleston, SC	W 8–4	Price	Perry	Hinkle	12–18	
Mar 24	Brown*	College Park • Charleston, SC	W 2–1	Sica	Stanzler	Hinkle	13–18	
Mar 26	East Tennessee State	College Park • Charleston, SC	W 3–2	Morillo	Cooper	None	14–18	5–5
Mar 26	East Tennessee State	College Park • Charleston, SC	L 1–4	Anderson	Callahan	None	14–19	5–6
Mar 27	East Tennessee State	College Park • Charleston, SC	W 5–0	Howard	Maxwell	Morillo	15–19	6–6
Mar 29	at Charleston Southern*	CSU Ballpark • North Charleston, SC	L 1–6	Maas	Mullen	Brownlee	15–20	
Mar 30	at South Carolina*	Sarge Frye Field • Columbia, SC	L 8–9^{11}	Ross	Morillo	None	15–21	

April
Date	Opponent	Site/stadium	Score	Win	Loss	Save	Overall record	SoCon Record
Apr 1	at Furman	Latham Baseball Stadium • Greenville, SC	W 5–2	Reames	Jordan	Hinkle	16–21	7–6
Apr 1	at Furman	Latham Baseball Stadium • Greenville, SC	W 3–2	Howard	Banks	Morillo	17–21	8–6
Apr 2	at Furman	Latham Baseball Stadium • Greenville, SC	L 6–7	Braswell	Callahan	Austin	17–22	8–7
Apr 4	at Campbell*	Taylor Stadium • Buies Creek, NC	W 8–0	Sica	Griffin	None	18–22	
Apr 5	at UNC Wilmington*	Brooks Field • Wilmington, NC	L 0–5	Howard	Price	None	18–23	
Apr 9	Georgia Southern	College Park • Charleston, SC	W 6–0	Reames	Roth	None	19–23	9–7
Apr 9	Georgia Southern	College Park • Charleston, SC	L 2–6	Masi	Morillo	None	19–24	9–8
Apr 10	Georgia Southern	College Park • Charleston, SC	L 0–2	Rushing	Sica	None	19–25	9–9
Apr 12	College of Charleston*	College Park • Charleston, SC	L 2–4	Thomas	Callahan	Foxhall	19–26	
Apr 13	Campbell*	College Park • Charleston, SC	W 10–6	Morillo	Evans	Hinkle	20–26	
Apr 14	UNC Wilmington*	College Park • Charleston, SC	W 4–2	Mullen	Rogers	Sica	21–26	
Apr 16	Marshall	College Park • Charleston, SC	L 4–10	Spade	Reames	None	21–27	9–10
Apr 16	Marshall	College Park • Charleston, SC	L 1–4	Winters	Howard	None	21–28	9–11
Apr 17	Marshall	College Park • Charleston, SC	L 4–9	Paugh	Callahan	None	21–29	9–12
Apr 19	at Winthrop*	Winthrop Ballpark • Rock Hill, SC	L 4–6	Link	Sica	None	21–30	
Apr 20	Coastal Carolina*	College Park • Charleston, SC	W 3–2	Mullen	Covell	Reames	22–30	
Apr 23	at VMI	Patchin Field • Lexington, VA	W 8–7	Hinkle	Goodrich	Morillo	23–30	10–12
Apr 23	at VMI	Patchin Field • Lexington, VA	L 6–8	Martin	Howard	Glynn	23–31	10–13
Apr 24	at VMI	Patchin Field • Lexington, VA	W 6–2	Sica	Payne	Glynn	24–31	11–13
Apr 26	Charleston Southern*	College Park • Charleston, SC	W 7–0	Callahan	Maas	None	25–31	

Postseason

SoCon Tournament
Date	Opponent	Site/stadium	Score	Win	Loss	Save	Overall record	SoConT Record
Apr 28	East Tennessee State	College Park • Charleston, SC	W 8–3	Reames	Anderson	None	26–31	1–0
Apr 29	Davidson	College Park • Charleston, SC	W 10–4	Sica	Andrews	None	27–31	2–0
Apr 30	VMI	College Park • Charleston, SC	W 4–3	Hinkle	Goodrich	None	28–31	3–0
May 1	Western Carolina	College Park • Charleston, SC	W 4–2	Callahan	Beverlin	Morillo	29–31	4–0

NCAA Play-in Series
Date	Opponent	Site/stadium	Score	Win	Loss	Save	Overall record	Series record
May 20	Middle Tennessee	College Park • Charleston, SC	W 4–3^{10}	Morillo	Rickman	None	30–31	1–0
May 21	Middle Tennessee	College Park • Charleston, SC	L 3–11	Conway	Sica	None	30–32	1–1
May 21	Middle Tennessee	College Park • Charleston, SC	W 4–0	Callahan	Swistak	None	31–32	2–1

NCAA East Regional
Date	Opponent	Site/stadium	Score	Win	Loss	Save	Overall record	NCAAT record
May 26	at Clemson	Beautiful Tiger Field • Clemson, SC	L 1–5	Taulbee	Reames	None	31–33	0–1
May 27	vs Virginia Tech	Beautiful Tiger Field • Clemson, SC	W 4–3	Callahan	Preston	Morillo	32–33	1–1
May 28	vs Notre Dame	Beautiful Tiger Field • Clemson, SC	L 1–5	Mohs	Mullen	None	32–34	1–2

== 1995 ==
1995 The Citadel Bulldogs baseball

SoCon champion SoCon tournament champion

NCAA Mideast Regional, 0–2
- Conference: Southern Conference
- Record: 39–19 (19–5 SoCon)
- Head coach: Fred Jordan (4th season)
- Home stadium: College Park

1995 Southern Conference baseball standings
	Conf.				Overall
Team	W		L	PCT	W		L	PCT
The Citadel ‍†‍‡‍^{y}	19	–	5	.792	39	–	19	.672
Georgia Southern ‍‍‍	14	–	10	.583	35	–	24	.593
Western Carolina ‍‍‍	13	–	11	.542	32	–	24	.571
Davidson ‍‍‍	12	–	12	.500	19	–	32	.373
East Tennessee State ‍‍‍	11	–	12	.478	25	–	27	.481
Appalachian State ‍‍‍	10	–	13	.435	17	–	30	.362
VMI ‍‍‍	10	–	14	.417	19	–	28	.404
Marshall ‍‍‍	9	–	15	.375	12	–	38	.240
Furman ‍‍‍	9	–	15	.375	16	–	32	.333
† – Conference champion ‡ – SoCon Tournament champion y – Invited to the NCAA tournament As of June 30, 1995; Rankings from Collegiate Baseball

=== Roster ===
1995 The Citadel Bulldogs roster
Pitchers: - Brian Callahan - Junior; - Kevin Durham - Freshman; - Jon Hinkle - Senior; - Norman Howard - Senior; - Jimmy Jones - Freshman; - Tom Martin - Freshman; - Scott Mullen - Sophomore; - John Price - Junior; - Britt Reames - Junior; - Jay Reames; - Chris Sica - Sophomore	Catchers Infielders: - David Beckley - Junior; - Bo Betchman - Sophomore; - Ryan Butler - Sophomore	Outfielders: - Garrick Haltiwanger; - Dale Sistare	Unknown: - Kurt Beerman - Sophomore; - Dan Crosby; - Mike Darnell; - Jon Hinkle; - Rusty Hughes; - Ken Lott; - Pat Moody; - Donald Morillo - Senior; - Steve Savage - Senior; - Jerry Simmons - Freshman; - Terrence Smalls - Freshman

=== Coaches ===
1995 The Citadel Bulldogs baseball coaching staff
- Fred Jordan - Head coach - 4th year
- Dan McDonnell - Assistant coach - 2nd year
- Chris Lemonis - Assistant coach - 1st year

=== Schedule ===
1995 The Citadel Bulldogs baseball game log
Regular season

February
Date	Opponent	Site/stadium	Score	Win	Loss	Save	Overall record	SoCon Record
Feb 10	Kentucky*	College Park • Charleston, SC (Citgo Southern Challenge)	L 2–3	Milburn	B. Reames	Buckman	0–1	
Feb 12	South Carolina*	College Park • Charleston, SC (Citgo Southern Challenge)	W 9–5	Callahan	Pearsall	None	1–1	
Feb 14	Winthrop*	College Park • Charleston, SC	W 6–2	Hinkle	Abbott	None	2–1	
Feb 17	NC State*	College Park • Charleston, SC	L 7–13	Harvey	Callahan	None	2–2	
Feb 19	NC State*	College Park • Charleston, SC	L 2–4	Roupe	J. Reames	Cronemeyer	2–3	
Feb 19	NC State*	College Park • Charleston, SC	W 7–3	B. Reames	Scarce	Morillo	3–3	
Feb 21	at South Carolina*	Sarge Frye Field • Columbia, SC	L 3–7	Ross	Price	None	3–4	
Feb 22	at Coastal Carolina*	Charles Watson Stadium • Conway, SC	W 5–2	Morillo	Barbon	None	4–4	
Feb 25	Appalachian State	College Park • Charleston, SC	L 1–2^{10}	Stutzman	Hinkle	None	4–5	0–1
Feb 25	Appalachian State	College Park • Charleston, SC	W 3–2	Callahan	Crews	None	5–5	1–1
Feb 26	Appalachian State	College Park • Charleston, SC	W 7–6	Morillo	Falco	None	6–5	2–1
Feb 28	at College of Charleston*		W 2–1	Sica	Johnson	Morillo	7–5	

March
Date	Opponent	Site/stadium	Score	Win	Loss	Save	Overall record	SoCon Record
Mar 3	vs Xavier*	Harmon Stadium • Jacksonville, FL (Kennel Club Classic)	W 6–1	Jones	Bradford	None	8–5	
Mar 4	at North Florida*	Harmon Stadium • Jacksonville, FL (Kennel Club Classic)	L 4–7	McKee	B. Reames	Rich	8–6	
Mar 5	vs Central Michigan*	Harmon Stadium • Jacksonville, FL (Kennel Club Classic)	L 3–4	Rokos	Morillo	None	8–7	
Mar 6	Navy*	College Park • Charleston, SC	L 1–4	Moore	Sica	None	8–8	
Mar 7	South Carolina*	College Park • Charleston, SC	L 1–3	Stoops	Callahan	Ross	8–9	
Mar 8	Navy*	College Park • Charleston, SC	W 16–8	Hinkle	Carlson	None	9–9	
Mar 11	at Davidson	T. Henry Wilson Jr. Field • Davidson, NC	W 6–2	B. Reames	Stolk	None	10–9	3–1
Mar 11	at Davidson	T. Henry Wilson Jr. Field • Davidson, NC	L 1–4	Pllard	Mullen	None	10–10	3–2
Mar 12	at Davidson	T. Henry Wilson Jr. Field • Davidson, NC	W 10–7	Callahan	Coulombe	Howard	11–10	4–2
Mar 14	Butler*	College Park • Charleston, SC	W 3–0	Price	Velardi	Morillo	12–10	
Mar 15	Butler*	College Park • Charleston, SC	W 6–5	Hinkle	Briski	Morillo	13–10	
Mar 18	at East Tennessee State	Thomas Stadium • Johnson City, TN	W 13–1	B. Reames	Maxwell	None	14–10	5–2
Mar 18	at East Tennessee State	Thomas Stadium • Johnson City, TN	L 3–4	Ball	Morillo	None	14–11	5–3
Mar 19	at East Tennessee State	Thomas Stadium • Johnson City, TN	L 4–7	Anderson	Hinkle	Ball	14–12	5–4
Mar 22	at South Carolina*	Sarge Frye Field • Columbia, SC	L 4–10	Stoops	Mullen	None	14–13	
Mar 23	Brown*	College Park • Charleston, SC	W 9–3	Sica	Hargrave	Morillo	15–13	
Mar 24	Brown*	College Park • Charleston, SC	W 7–6	Price	Miller	None	16–13	
Mar 25	Furman	College Park • Charleston, SC	W 15–3	B. Reames	Rhine	None	17–13	6–4
Mar 25	Furman	College Park • Charleston, SC	W 5–4^{10}	Morillo	Bland	None	18–13	7–4
Mar 26	Furman	College Park • Charleston, SC	W 7–4	Howard	Banks	None	19–13	8–4
Mar 27	Brown*	College Park • Charleston, SC	L 2–4	Hargrave	Bridges	None	19–14	
Mar 28	at NC State*	Doak Field • Raleigh, NC	L 7–14	Harvey	Mullen	None	19–15	
Mar 29	at NC State*	Doak Field • Raleigh, NC	L 1–7	Stutz	Sica	None	19–16	

April
Date	Opponent	Site/stadium	Score	Win	Loss	Save	Overall record	SoCon Record
Apr 1	at Georgia Southern	J. I. Clements Stadium • Statesboro, GA	W 4–1	B. Reames	Rushing	Morillo	20–16	9–4
Apr 1	at Georgia Southern	J. I. Clements Stadium • Statesboro, GA	L 1–2^{10}	Lee	Callahan	None	20–17	9–5
Apr 2	at Georgia Southern	J. I. Clements Stadium • Statesboro, GA	W 5–2^{11}	Morillo	Lee	None	21–17	10–5
Apr 4	at Charleston Southern*	CSU Ballpark • North Charleston, SC	W 8–3^{11}	Morillo	Erwin	None	22–17	
Apr 8	at Marshall	Kennedy Center Field • Huntington, WV	W 7–1	B. Reames	Burke	None	23–17	11–5
Apr 8	at Marshall	Kennedy Center Field • Huntington, WV	W 7–0	Sica	Mohr	Morillo	24–17	12–5
Apr 9	at Marshall	Kennedy Center Field • Huntington, WV	W 4–0	Callahan	Thompson	None	25–17	13–5
Apr 12	Coastal Carolina*	College Park • Charleston, SC	W 6–2	Bridges	Smith	None	26–17	
Apr 15	VMI	College Park • Charleston, SC	W 3–2	B. Reames	Glynn	Morillo	27–17	14–5
Apr 15	VMI	College Park • Charleston, SC	W 7–4	Sica	Adams	Morillo	28–17	15–5
Apr 16	VMI	College Park • Charleston, SC	W 3–1	Callahan	Smith	Morillo	29–17	16–5
Apr 18	College of Charleston*	College Park • Charleston, SC	L 0–4	Johnson	Howard	Moore	29–18	
Apr 19	at Winthrop*	Winthrop Ballpark • Rock Hill, SC	L 5–6	Harmon	Bridges	Link	29–19	
Apr 22	Western Carolina	College Park • Charleston, SC	W 4–2	B. Reames	Maxwell	Morillo	30–19	17–5
Apr 22	Western Carolina	College Park • Charleston, SC	W 11–3	Sica	Sellers	None	31–19	18–5
Apr 23	Western Carolina	College Park • Charleston, SC	W 8–4	Callahan	DiFelice	None	32–19	19–5
Apr 25	Charleston Southern*	College Park • Charleston, SC	W 2–1	Hinkle	Erwin	None	33–19	

Postseason

SoCon Tournament
Date	Opponent	Site/stadium	Score	Win	Loss	Save	Overall record	SoConT Record
Apr 27	Marshall	College Park • Charleston, SC	W 5–1	B. Reames	Mohr	None	34–19	1–0
Apr 28	East Tennessee State	College Park • Charleston, SC	W 10–2	Callahan	Anderson	None	35–19	2–0
Apr 29	Georgia Southern	College Park • Charleston, SC	W 10–4	Sica	Sauls	Morillo	36–19	3–0
Apr 30	Georgia Southern	College Park • Charleston, SC	W 8–3	Morillo	Rushing	None	37–19	4–0

May
Date	Opponent	Site/stadium	Score	Win	Loss	Save	Overall record
May 14	Georgia College*	College Park • Charleston, SC	W 5–3	'B. Reames	Brown	Morillo	38–19
May 15	Georgia College*	College Park • Charleston, SC	W 11–6	Callahan	Dye	None	39–19

NCAA Mideast Regional
Date	Opponent	Site/stadium	Score	Win	Loss	Save	Overall record	NCAAT record
May 25	at (1) Tennessee	Lindsey Nelson Stadium • Knoxville, TN	L 2–5	Dickey	B. Reames	Helton	39–20	0–1
May 26	vs (5) Pittsburgh	Lindsey Nelson Stadium • Knoxville, TN	L 10–12	Bean	Callahan	Campbell	39–21	0–2

== 1996 ==
1996 The Citadel Bulldogs baseball
- Conference: Southern Conference
- Record: 33–26 (13–10 SoCon)
- Head coach: Fred Jordan (5th season)
- Home stadium: College Park

1996 Southern Conference baseball standings
	Conf.				Overall
Team	W		L	PCT	W		L	PCT
No. 14 Georgia Southern ^{†‡y} ‍‍‍	17	–	3	.850	46	–	14	.767
Western Carolina ‍‍‍	17	–	7	.708	32	–	24	.571
Furman ‍‍‍	15	–	9	.625	26	–	29	.473
The Citadel ‍‍‍	13	–	10	.565	33	–	26	.559
Appalachian State ‍‍‍	12	–	10	.545	27	–	19	.587
East Tennessee State ‍‍‍	11	–	12	.478	26	–	24	.520
VMI ‍‍‍	7	–	16	.304	17	–	29	.370
Davidson ‍‍‍	6	–	18	.250	16	–	33	.327
Marshall ‍‍‍	4	–	17	.190	7	–	35	.167
† – Conference champion ‡ – SoCon Tournament champion y – Invited to the NCAA tournament As of June 30, 1996; Rankings from Collegiate Baseball

=== Roster ===
1996 The Citadel Bulldogs roster
Pitchers: - Brian Callahan - Senior; - Kevin Durham - Sophomore; - Chris Gibson; - Sherwyn Haltiwanger; - Jimmy Jones - Sophomore; - Tom Martin - Sophomore; - John Price - Senior; - Jay Reames; - Brian Rogers - Freshman; - Chris Sica - Junior; - Grant Wallace; - Brian Wiley - Freshman	Catchers Infielders: - Ryan Butler - Junior; - Bo Betchman - Junior; - Terrence Smalls - Sophomore	Outfielders	Unknown: - David Beckley - Senior; - Kurt Beerman - Junior; - Mike Darnell; - Kevin Durham; - Aaron Haigler - Freshman; - Garrick Haltiwanger; - Sherwyn Haltiwanger; - Chad Huneycutt; - Ken Lott; - Chris Martin; - Pat Moody; - Kevin Morris; - Jerry Simmons - Sophomore

=== Coaches ===
1996 The Citadel Bulldogs baseball coaching staff
- Fred Jordan - Head coach - 5th year
- Dan McDonnell - Assistant coach - 3rd year
- Chris Lemonis - Assistant coach - 2nd year

=== Schedule ===
1996 The Citadel Bulldogs baseball game log
Regular season

February
Date	Opponent	Site/stadium	Score	Win	Loss	Save	Overall record	SoCon Record
Feb 9	UNC Greensboro*	College Park • Charleston, SC (Citgo Southern Challenge)	W 11–8	Jones	Kuykendall	Martin	1–0	
Feb 10	Old Dominion*	College Park • Charleston, SC (Citgo Colonial Southern Challenge)	L 5–8	Patterson	Wiley	Walker	1–1	
Feb 11	NC State*	College Park • Charleston, SC (Citgo Colonial Southern Challenge)	L 11–14	Baker	Reames	None	1–2	
Feb 16	vs Oklahoma State*	Alfred A. McKethan Stadium • Gainesville, FL	L 12–21	Thomas	Gibson	None	1–3	
Feb 17	at Florida*	Alfred A. McKethan Stadium • Gainesville, FL	W 11–9	Martin	Knollin	Price	2–3	
Feb 18	vs Southern California*	Alfred A. McKethan Stadium • Gainesville, FL	L 4–12	Immel	Jones	None	2–4	
Feb 20	Wofford*	College Park • Charleston, SC	W 20–0	Wiley	Roesel	None	3–4	
Feb 21	at Coastal Carolina*	Charles Watson Stadium • Conway, SC	L 2–3	Ellis	Rogers	Smith	3–5	
Feb 23	NYIT*	College Park • Charleston, SC	W 7–4	Martin	Clementz	Price	4–5	
Feb 24	NYIT*	College Park • Charleston, SC	W 7–6	Reames	Fox	None	5–5	
Feb 25	NYIT*	College Park • Charleston, SC	W 7–3	Wiley	Bigan	Gibson	6–5	
Feb 27	at College of Charleston*		W 14–6	Rogers	Byars	None	7–5	
Feb 29	Winthrop*	College Park • Charleston, SC	L 8–9	Santa	Wiley	Richards	7–6	

March
Date	Opponent	Site/stadium	Score	Win	Loss	Save	Overall record	SoCon Record
Mar 2	Davidson	College Park • Charleston, SC	L 6–9	Coulombe	Callahan	None	7–7	0–1
Mar 2	Davidson	College Park • Charleston, SC	W 8–1	Jones	Ingerick	None	8–7	1–1
Mar 3	Davidson	College Park • Charleston, SC	L 10–12	Pollard	Sica	Andrews	8–8	1–2
Mar 5	James Madison*	College Park • Charleston, SC	W 7–5	Martin	Parker	Price	9–8	
Mar 9	East Tennessee State	College Park • Charleston, SC	L 6–7	Jones	Callahan	Ball	9–9	1–3
Mar 9	East Tennessee State	College Park • Charleston, SC	W 6–4	Jones	Anderson	Martin	10–9	2–3
Mar 10	East Tennessee State	College Park • Charleston, SC	L 7–14	Maxwell	Rogers	None	10–10	2–4
Mar 12	Virginia Tech*	College Park • Charleston, SC	W 7–3	Sica	Hummel	None	11–10	
Mar 13	at South Carolina*	Sarge Frye Field • Columbia, SC	L 5–13	Harwas	Callahan	None	11–11	
Mar 14	Virginia Tech*	College Park • Charleston, SC	L 2–6	Hand	Wiley	None	11–12	
Mar 16	at Furman	Latham Baseball Stadium • Greenville, SC	L 8–9	Peterman	Martin	None	11–13	2–5
Mar 16	at Furman	Latham Baseball Stadium • Greenville, SC	W 6–4	Haltiwanger	Jordan	Maratin	12–13	3–5
Mar 17	at Furman	Latham Baseball Stadium • Greenville, SC	L 2–3^{10}	Noyce	Martin	None	12–14	3–6
Mar 19	Ohio*	College Park • Charleston, SC	W 9–3	Callahan	Schubremehl	Haltiwanger	13–14	
Mar 20	South Carolina*	College Park • Charleston, SC	L 1–4	Harwas	Wiley	None	13–15	
Mar 21	NYIT*	College Park • Charleston, SC	L 9–12	McKeon	Durham	None	13–16	
Mar 22	Brown*	College Park • Charleston, SC	W 21–5	Rogers	Milewski	None	14–16	
Mar 23	Georgia Southern	College Park • Charleston, SC	L 8–10	Washburn	Jones	None	14–17	3–7
Mar 23	Georgia Southern	College Park • Charleston, SC	L 2–8	Sauls	Sica	None	14–18	3–8
Mar 24	Georgia Southern	College Park • Charleston, SC	W 6–5	Callahan	Ayala	Martin	15–18	4–8
Mar 25	Brown*	College Park • Charleston, SC	W 8–7	Durham	Ballard	None	16–18	
Mar 26	Brown*	College Park • Charleston, SC	W 13–12	Reames	Sliston	Martin	17–18	
Mar 30	Marshall	College Park • Charleston, SC	W 4–3^{11}	Martin	Grimes	None	18–18	5–8
Mar 30	Marshall	College Park • Charleston, SC	W 15–5	Sica	Grimes	None	19–18	6–8
Mar 31	Marshall	College Park • Charleston, SC	W 6–1	Jones	Mallory	Price	20–18	7–8

April
Date	Opponent	Site/stadium	Score	Win	Loss	Save	Overall record	SoCon Record
Apr 2	at NC State*	Doak Field • Raleigh, NC	L 2–3	Rambusch	Martin	Cronemeyer	20–19	
Apr 3	at NC State*	Doak Field • Raleigh, NC	L 5–13	Jones	Callahan	None	20–20	
Apr 6	at VMI*	Patchin Field • Lexington, VA	W 14–4	Callahan	Hughes	None	21–20	8–8
Apr 6	at VMI*	Patchin Field • Lexington, VA	W 5–1	Sica	Smith	None	22–20	9–8
Apr 7	at VMI*	Patchin Field • Lexington, VA	L 5–13	Dietrich	Jones	None	22–21	9–9
Apr 9	at Charleston Southern*	CSU Ballpark • North Charleston, SC	W 5–1	Rogers	Harrison	None	23–21	
Apr 13	at Western Carolina	Hennon Stadium • Cullowhee, NC	W 6–1	Callahan	DiFelice	None	24–21	10–9
Apr 13	at Western Carolina	Hennon Stadium • Cullowhee, NC	L 2–5	Bain	Martin	None	24–22	10–10
Apr 14	at Western Carolina	Hennon Stadium • Cullowhee, NC	W 2–1	Rogers	Davidson	Price	25–22	11–10
Apr 16	College of Charleston*	College Park • Charleston, SC	W 5–4	Reames	Alexander	Martin	26–22	
Apr 17	Coastal Carolina*	College Park • Charleston, SC	L 3–5^{14}	Bagwell	Martin	None	26–23	
Apr 19	at Winthrop*	Winthrop Ballpark • Rock Hill, SC	L 4–5	Wofford	Haltiwanger	None	26–24	
Apr 20	at Appalachian State	Boone, NC	W 10–6	Price	Vest	None	27–24	12–10
Apr 21	at Appalachian State	Boone, NC	W 10–0	Rogers	Stutzman	None	28–24	13–10
Apr 23	Charleston Southern*	College Park • Charleston, SC	W 7–6^{10}	Martin	Wiggins	None	29–24	

Postseason

SoCon Tournament
Date	Opponent	Site/stadium	Score	Win	Loss	Save	Overall record	SoConT Record
Apr 25	Appalachian State	College Park • Charleston, SC	W 6–2	Callahan		None	30–24	1–0
Apr 27	Georgia Southern	College Park • Charleston, SC	L 3–4	Cummings	Martin	Lee	30–25	1–1
Apr 27	Furman	College Park • Charleston, SC	W 17–3	Rogers	Noyce	None	31–25	2–1
Apr 28	East Tennessee State	College Park • Charleston, SC	W 11–0	Reames	Hart	None	32–25	3–1
Apr 28	VMI	College Park • Charleston, SC	W 8–5	Price	Newrocki	Martin	33–25	4–1
Apr 28	Georgia Southern	College Park • Charleston, SC	L 1–7	Washburn	Callahan	None	33–26	4–2

== 1997 ==
1997 The Citadel Bulldogs baseball
- Conference: Southern Conference
- Record: 37–21 (16–7 SoCon)
- Head coach: Fred Jordan (6th season)
- Home stadium: College Park/Joseph P. Riley Jr. Park

1997 Southern Conference baseball standings
	Conf.				Overall
Team	W		L	PCT	W		L	PCT
Western Carolina ‍†‍‡‍^{y}	18	–	6	.750	42	–	20	.677
Georgia Southern ‍†‍‍	18	–	6	.750	34	–	26	.567
The Citadel ‍‍‍	16	–	7	.696	37	–	21	.638
Furman ‍‍‍	13	–	11	.542	29	–	23	.558
East Tennessee State ‍‍‍	11	–	11	.500	21	–	24	.467
Davidson ‍‍‍	8	–	15	.348	18	–	34	.346
Appalachian State ‍‍‍	8	–	16	.333	16	–	32	.333
VMI ‍‍‍	6	–	13	.316	13	–	35	.271
Marshall ‍‍‍	4	–	17	.190	7	–	39	.152
† – Conference champion ‡ – SoCon Tournament champion y – Invited to the NCAA tournament As of June 30, 1997; Rankings from Collegiate Baseball

=== Roster ===
1997 The Citadel Bulldogs roster
Pitchers: - Kyle Bunn - Freshman; - Ron Colvard - Freshman; - Kevin Durham - Junior; - Chris Friedberg; - Sherwyn Haltiwanger; - Jimmy Jones - Junior; - Tom Martin - Junior; - Brian Rogers - Sophomore; - Chris Sica - Senior; - Grant Wallace; - Brian Wiley - Sophomore	Catchers: - Jay Morgan - Freshman; Infielders	Outfielders: - Rodney Hancock - Freshman; Travis Carswell-Freshman	Unknown: - Kurt Beerman - Senior; - Bo Betchman - Senior; - Ryan Butler - Senior; - Kevin Durham; - Aaron Haigler - Sophomore; - Sherwyn Haltiwanger; - Rodney Hancock - Freshman; - Chad Huneycutt; - Chris Martin; - Tom Martin; - Jerry Simmons - Junior; - Tavy Smalls - Freshman; - Terrence Smalls - Junior

=== Coaches ===
1997 The Citadel Bulldogs baseball coaching staff
- Fred Jordan - Head coach - 6th year
- Dan McDonnell - Assistant coach - 4th year
- Chris Lemonis - Assistant coach - 3rd year

=== Schedule ===
1997 The Citadel Bulldogs baseball game log
Regular season

February
Date	Opponent	Site/stadium	Score	Win	Loss	Save	Overall record	SoCon Record
Feb 7	East Carolina*	College Park • Charleston, SC (Aramark Colonial Southern Challenge)	W 8–4	Haltiwanger	Fields	None	1–0	
Feb 8	Old Dominion*	College Park • Charleston, SC (Aramark Colonial Southern Challenge)	W 7–3	Wiley	Fields	None	2–0	
Feb 9	VCU*	College Park • Charleston, SC (Aramark Colonial Southern Challenge)	L 2–6	Berryman	Wallace	None	2–1	
Feb 12	at College of Charleston*		W 9–2	Rogers	Oliver	None	3–1	
Feb 15	Wake Forest*	College Park • Charleston, SC (CITGO Southern Challenge)	L 7–14	Homes	Sica	MacDougal	3–2	
Feb 16	South Carolina*	College Park • Charleston, SC (CITGO Southern Challenge)	L 3–4^{11}	Speer	Martin	None	3–3	
Feb 19	at College of Charleston*		L 5–11	Arrington	Jones	None	3–4	
Feb 22	at Davidson	T. Henry Wilson Jr. Field • Davidson, NC	L 9–8	Stolk	Rogers	None	3–5	0–1
Feb 22	at Davidson	T. Henry Wilson Jr. Field • Davidson, NC	W 8–0	Wiley	Coulombe	None	4–5	1–1
Feb 23	at Davidson	T. Henry Wilson Jr. Field • Davidson, NC	W 15–3	Sica	Case	None	5–5	2–1
Feb 26	Mount St. Mary's*	College Park • Charleston, SC	W 16–4	Colvard	Kelly	None	6–5	
Feb 27	St. John's*	College Park • Charleston, SC	L 0–4	Adair	Smith	None	6–6	

March
Date	Opponent	Site/stadium	Score	Win	Loss	Save	Overall record	SoCon Record
Mar 2	at East Tennessee State	Thomas Stadium • Johnson City, TN	W 9–2	Rogers	White	None	7–6	3–1
Mar 2	at East Tennessee State	Thomas Stadium • Johnson City, TN	W 11–3	Wiley	Snow	None	8–6	4–1
Mar 4	at Charleston Southern*	CSU Ballpark • North Charleston, SC	W 12–7	Sica	Cisar	None	9–6	
Mar 5	Charleston Southern*	College Park • Charleston, SC	W 7–5	Durham	Easler	Martin	10–6	
Mar 8	Furman	College Park • Charleston, SC	W 6–1	Rogers	Noyce	Martin	11–6	5–1
Mar 8	Furman	College Park • Charleston, SC	L 3–4	John	Wiley	None	11–7	5–2
Mar 9	Furman	College Park • Charleston, SC	W 6–2	Sica	Rhine	None	12–7	6–2
Mar 11	College of Charleston*	College Park • Charleston, SC	W 13–4	Smith	Warren	None	13–7	
Mar 12	Tennessee Tech*	College Park • Charleston, SC	L 7–9	Lay	Durham	Brooker	13–8	
Mar 13	Tennessee Tech*	College Park • Charleston, SC	W 13–3	Jones	Potter	None	14–8	
Mar 15	at Georgia Southern	J. I. Clements Stadium • Statesboro, GA	L 13–2	Sauls	Rogers	None	14–9	6–3
Mar 15	at Georgia Southern	J. I. Clements Stadium • Statesboro, GA	W 8–4	Wiley	Hall	None	15–9	7–3
Mar 16	at Georgia Southern	J. I. Clements Stadium • Statesboro, GA	L 2–4	Cummings	Sica	Lee	15–10	7–4
Mar 17	Princeton*	College Park • Charleston, SC	W 16–10	Durham	Kilgoar	None	16–10	
Mar 18	at Winthrop*	Winthrop Ballpark • Rock Hill, SC	W 16–11	Martin	Richards	None	17–10	
Mar 19	Princeton*	College Park • Charleston, SC	W 8–4	Wiley	Quintana	None	18–10	
Mar 22	at Marshall	Kennedy Center Field • Huntington, WV	W 18–11	Wiley	Herrington	None	19–10	8–4
Mar 22	at Marshall	Kennedy Center Field • Huntington, WV	W 10–3	Rogers	Grimes	None	20–10	9–4
Mar 23	at Marshall	Kennedy Center Field • Huntington, WV	W 13–9	Morgan	Curtis	Martin	21–10	10–4
Mar 24	at East Carolina*	Greenville, NC	W 19–6	Smith	Outlaw	Durham	22–10	
Mar 25	at East Carolina*	Greenville, NC	L 3–10	Clark	Jones	None	22–11	
Mar 26	at South Carolina*	Sarge Frye Field • Columbia, SC	W 5–3	Rogers	Hoshour	Martin	23–11	
Mar 29	VMI	College Park • Charleston, SC	L 10–11^{11}	Adams	Martin	None	23–12	10–5
Mar 29	VMI	College Park • Charleston, SC	W 12–3	Rogers	Helms	None	24–12	11–5
Mar 30	VMI	College Park • Charleston, SC	W 19–10	Sica	Hughes	None	25–12	12–5

April
Date	Opponent	Site/stadium	Score	Win	Loss	Save	Overall record	SoCon Record
Apr 1	at NC State*	Doak Field • Raleigh, NC	L 13–17	Hughes	Hancock	None	25–13	
Apr 1	at NC State*	Doak Field • Raleigh, NC	L 0–16	Ormond	Haltiwanger	None	25–14	
Apr 5	Western Carolina	College Park • Charleston, SC	L 4–5	Davidson	Martin	None	25–15	12–6
Apr 5	Western Carolina	College Park • Charleston, SC	L 2–5	Maxwell	Wiley	None	25–16	12–7
Apr 6	Western Carolina	Joseph P. Riley Jr. Park • Charleston, SC	W 6–5	Hancock	McAvoy	None	26–16	13–7
Apr 8	College of Charleston*	Joseph P. Riley Jr. Park • Charleston, SC	W 14–11	Hancock	Alexander	None	27–16	
Apr 10	Coastal Carolina*	Joseph P. Riley Jr. Park • Charleston, SC	L 6–7^{10}	Duperron	Hancock	None	27–17	
Apr 12	Appalachian State	Joseph P. Riley Jr. Park • Charleston, SC	W 8–6	Rogers	Stutzman	Martin	28–17	14–7
Apr 12	Appalachian State	Joseph P. Riley Jr. Park • Charleston, SC	W 6–5	Martin	Fisher	None	29–17	15–7
Apr 13	Appalachian State	Joseph P. Riley Jr. Park • Charleston, SC	W 7–2	Sica	Anderson	None	30–17	16–7
Apr 15	at Charleston Southern*	CSU Ballpark • North Charleston, SC	W 14–8	Colvard	Warren	Jones	31–17	
Apr 16	at Coastal Carolina*	Charles Watson Stadium • Conway, SC	L 3–4	Duperron	Wiley	Crossen	31–18	
Apr 17	Winthrop*	Joseph P. Riley Jr. Park • Charleston, SC	W 4–3	Martin	Richards	None	32–18	
Apr 19	Wofford*	Joseph P. Riley Jr. Park • Charleston, SC	W 9–8	Sica	Salley	Martin	33–18	
Apr 19	Wofford*	Joseph P. Riley Jr. Park • Charleston, SC	L 1–7	Klomparens	Jones	None	34–18	
Apr 20	Wofford*	Joseph P. Riley Jr. Park • Charleston, SC	W 10–5	Wiley	Long	None	35–18	
Apr 22	Charleston Southern*	Joseph P. Riley Jr. Park • Charleston, SC	W 5–2	Hancock	Midgett	Martin	36–18	

Postseason

SoCon Tournament
Date	Opponent	Site/stadium	Score	Win	Loss	Save	Overall record	SoConT Record
Apr 24	Davidson	Joseph P. Riley Jr. Park • Charleston, SC	W 18–8	Rogers	Coulombe	None	37–18	1–0
Apr 25	Georgia Southern	Joseph P. Riley Jr. Park • Charleston, SC	W 14–5	Wiley	Cummings	None	38–18	2–0
Apr 26	Western Carolina	Joseph P. Riley Jr. Park • Charleston, SC	L 3–10	Bain	Sica	None	38–19	2–1
Apr 27	Furman	Joseph P. Riley Jr. Park • Charleston, SC	L 2–4	John	Smith	None	38–20	2–2

== 1998 ==
1998 The Citadel Bulldogs baseball

SoCon tournament champion

East Regional, 1–2
- Conference: Southern Conference
- Record: 37–24 (21–5 SoCon)
- Head coach: Fred Jordan (7th season)
- Home stadium: Joseph P. Riley Jr. Park

1998 Southern Conference baseball standings
	Conf.				Overall
Team	W		L	PCT	W		L	PCT
UNC Greensboro ‍†‍‍	22	–	5	.815	40	–	18	.690
The Citadel ‍‍‡‍^{y}	21	–	5	.808	37	–	24	.607
Western Carolina ‍‍‍	20	–	6	.769	42	–	15	.737
Furman ‍‍‍	12	–	12	.500	21	–	27	.438
Wofford ‍‍‍	10	–	12	.455	15	–	32	.319
Georgia Southern ‍‍‍	9	–	15	.375	22	–	30	.423
Davidson ‍‍‍	8	–	16	.333	13	–	38	.255
East Tennessee State ‍‍‍	8	–	18	.308	18	–	31	.367
VMI ‍‍‍	7	–	17	.292	14	–	35	.286
Appalachian State ‍‍‍	6	–	17	.261	13	–	28	.317
† – Conference champion ‡ – SoCon Tournament champion y – Invited to the NCAA tournament As of June 30, 1998; Rankings from Collegiate Baseball

=== Roster ===
1998 The Citadel Bulldogs roster
Pitchers Freshman: - Chris Harris -; - Kyle Bunn -; Sophomore: - Ron Colvard - Sophomore; - Kristiaan de Roos; - Kevin Durham - Senior; - Chris Friedberg; - Rodney Hancock - Sophomore; - Tom Martin - Senior; - Brian Rogers - Junior; - Brian Wiley - Junior	Catchers: - Jay Morgan - Sophomore; Infielders: - Philip Hartig - Freshman	Outfielders: - Kevin Durham	Unknown: - Steven Ackles; - Ryan Anderson; - Daryl Byrd - Freshman; - Chris Eckert - Freshman; - Aaron Haigler - Junior; - Rodney Hancock - Sophomore; - Michael Harris; - Stuart Jordan - Freshman; - Chris Martin; - Tom Martin; - Chris Morris - Freshman; - Eric Robb; - Jerry Simmons - Senior; - Tavy Smalls - Sophomore; - Terrence Smalls - Senior

=== Coaches ===
1998 The Citadel Bulldogs baseball coaching staff
- Fred Jordan - Head coach - 7th year
- Dan McDonnell - Assistant coach - 6th year
- Chris Lemonis - Assistant coach - 4th year

=== Schedule ===
1998 The Citadel Bulldogs baseball game log
Regular season

February
Date	Opponent	Site/stadium	Score	Win	Loss	Save	Overall record	SoCon Record
Feb 10	at Coastal Carolina*	Charles Watson Stadium • Conway, SC	W 11–7	Wiley	Johnson	None	1–0	
Feb 13	Richmond*	Joseph P. Riley Jr. Park • Charleston, SC (Franklin Life Shootout)	L 4–9	Morris	Colvard	None	1–1	
Feb 14	Tennessee*	Joseph P. Riley Jr. Park • Charleston, SC (Franklin Life Shootout)	L 1–5	Hudson	Wiley	Burdine	1–2	
Feb 15	South Carolina*	Joseph P. Riley Jr. Park • Charleston, SC (Franklin Life Shootout)	L 0–8	Kondro	Rogers	None	1–3	
Feb 18	St. John's*	Joseph P. Riley Jr. Park • Charleston, SC	L 4–5	Van Saders	Colvard	Marietta	1–4	
Feb 20	Virginia Tech*	Joseph P. Riley Jr. Park • Charleston, SC (Winn-Dixie Shootout)	W 7–6^{11}	Martin	Lichtel	None	2–4	
Feb 21	Georgia*	Joseph P. Riley Jr. Park • Charleston, SC (Winn-Dixie Shootout)	W 7–6	Martin	Clark	None	3–4	
Feb 24	at Florida State*	Dick Howser Stadium • Tallahassee, FL	L 4–9	Bentley	Hancock	None	3–5	
Feb 25	at Florida State*	Dick Howser Stadium • Tallahassee, FL	L 5–15	McDonald	Wiley	None	3–6	
Feb 28	Radford*	Joseph P. Riley Jr. Park • Charleston, SC	W 3–2	Bunn	Cecchini	Martin	4–6	
Feb 28	Radford*	Joseph P. Riley Jr. Park • Charleston, SC	W 6–5	Martin	Speir	None	5–6	

March
Date	Opponent	Site/stadium	Score	Win	Loss	Save	Overall record	SoCon Record
Mar 1	Radford*	Joseph P. Riley Jr. Park • Charleston, SC	L 2–10	Booth	de Roos	None	5–7	
Mar 4	at Winthrop*	Winthrop Ballpark • Rock Hill, SC	L 3–9	Koziara	Wiley	None	5–8	
Mar 6	vs Troy*	Montgomery, AL (Blue-Gray Classic)	L 4–10	Ersnberger	Rogers	None	5–9	
Mar 8	vs Army*	Montgomery, AL (Blue-Gray Classic)	W 10–1	Hancock	King	None	6–9	
Mar 10	Navy*	Joseph P. Riley Jr. Park • Charleston, SC	L 0–4	Hoak	Colvard	None	6–10	
Mar 11	Navy*	Joseph P. Riley Jr. Park • Charleston, SC	L 4–5	Abshire	Martin	None	6–11	
Mar 12	at NC State*	Doak Field • Raleigh, NC	L 3–10	Dobson	Friedberg	None	6–12	
Mar 14	Appalachian State	Joseph P. Riley Jr. Park • Charleston, SC	W 7–4	Wiley	Lemonds	Martin	7–12	1–0
Mar 14	Appalachian State	Joseph P. Riley Jr. Park • Charleston, SC	W 10–2	Hancock	King	None	8–12	2–0
Mar 15	Appalachian State	Joseph P. Riley Jr. Park • Charleston, SC	W 12–3	Rogers	Cheek	Colvard	9–12	3–0
Mar 21	East Tennessee State	Joseph P. Riley Jr. Park • Charleston, SC	W 4–3	Rogers	Harrell	Martin	10–12	4–0
Mar 21	East Tennessee State	Joseph P. Riley Jr. Park • Charleston, SC	W 18–0	Hancock	White	None	11–12	5–0
Mar 22	East Tennessee State	Joseph P. Riley Jr. Park • Charleston, SC	W 6–4	Wiley	Doyle	Martin	12–12	6–0
Mar 24	Wofford	Joseph P. Riley Jr. Park • Charleston, SC	W 9–4	Colvard	Shallenberger	None	13–12	7–0
Mar 25	at Clemson*	Beautiful Tiger Field • Clemson, SC	L 0–5	Adams	Rogers	None	13–13	
Mar 28	UNC Greensboro	Joseph P. Riley Jr. Park • Charleston, SC	L 0–4	Woehrle	Wiley	None	13–14	7–1
Mar 28	UNC Greensboro	Joseph P. Riley Jr. Park • Charleston, SC	L 1–3	McDonald	Hancock	Parsons	13–15	7–2
Mar 29	UNC Greensboro	Joseph P. Riley Jr. Park • Charleston, SC	L 3–5^{11}	Parsons	Martin	None	13–16	7–3
Mar 31	at Georgia Southern	J. I. Clements Stadium • Statesboro, GA	W 7–1	Colvard	Sauls	None	14–16	8–3

April
Date	Opponent	Site/stadium	Score	Win	Loss	Save	Overall record	SoCon Record
Apr 1	at Georgia Southern	J. I. Clements Stadium • Statesboro, GA	W 9–3	Hancock	Washburn	None	15–16	9–3
Apr 1	at Georgia Southern	J. I. Clements Stadium • Statesboro, GA	W 9–4	Wiley	Standridge	None	16–16	10–3
Apr 4	at Furman	Latham Baseball Stadium • Greenville, SC	W 1–0	Rogers	Noyce	Martin	17–16	11–3
Apr 4	at Furman	Latham Baseball Stadium • Greenville, SC	W 13–7	Bunn	John	None	18–16	12–3
Apr 5	at Furman	Latham Baseball Stadium • Greenville, SC	W 9–3	Friedberg	Bates	Hancock	19–16	13–3
Apr 7	at Charleston Southern*	CSU Ballpark • North Charleston, SC	L 10–13	Whitehurst	Friedberg	MacIver	19–17	
Apr 11	Davidson	Joseph P. Riley Jr. Park • Charleston, SC	W 23–9	Rogers	Stroker	None	20–17	14–3
Apr 11	Davidson	Joseph P. Riley Jr. Park • Charleston, SC	L 3–4	DeSimone	Martin	None	20–18	14–4
Apr 12	Davidson	Joseph P. Riley Jr. Park • Charleston, SC	W 4–3	Martin	Case	None	21–18	15–4
Apr 13	College of Charleston*	Joseph P. Riley Jr. Park • Charleston, SC	W 6–1	Colvard	Wentzky	Martin	22–18	
Apr 14	at South Carolina*	Sarge Frye Field • Columbia, SC	W 8–4	Hancock	Barber	None	23–18	
Apr 15	at North Carolina*	Boshamer Stadium • Chapel Hill, NC	L 2–5	Horney	Rogers	DePriest	23–19	
Apr 18	at Western Carolina	Hennon Stadium • Cullowhee, NC	L 6–9	Waters	Colvard	Pember	23–20	15–5
Apr 18	at Western Carolina	Hennon Stadium • Cullowhee, NC	W 10–7	Colvard	Martin	Bain	24–20	16–5
Apr 22	Wofford	Joseph P. Riley Jr. Park • Charleston, SC	W 9–0	Rogers	Lawton	None	25–20	17–5
Apr 22	Wofford	Joseph P. Riley Jr. Park • Charleston, SC	W 24–7	Colvard	Norris	None	26–20	18–5
Apr 25	at VMI	Patchin Field • Lexington, VA	W 8–4	Wiley	Barrow	Martin	27–20	19–5
Apr 25	at VMI	Patchin Field • Lexington, VA	W 7–4	Hancock	Craun	None	28–20	20–5
Apr 26	at VMI	Patchin Field • Lexington, VA	W 10–6	Colvard	Howle	None	29–20	21–5
Apr 28	Charleston Southern*	Joseph P. Riley Jr. Park • Charleston, SC	L 3–4	Whitehurst	de Roos	Humbert	29–21	

Postseason

SoCon Tournament
Date	Opponent	Site/stadium	Score	Win	Loss	Save	Overall record	SoConT Record
Apr 30	(7) Davidson	Joseph P. Riley Jr. Park • Charleston, SC	W 11–2	Wiley	Bowers	None	30–21	1–0
May 1	(3) Western Carolina	Joseph P. Riley Jr. Park • Charleston, SC	W 5–0	Rogers	Bain	None	31–21	2–0
May 2	(1) UNC Greensboro	Joseph P. Riley Jr. Park • Charleston, SC	W 9–0	Hancock	McDonald	None	32–21	3–0
May 3	(1) UNC Greensboro	Joseph P. Riley Jr. Park • Charleston, SC	W 12–1	Rogers	Woekrle	None	33–21	4–0

May
Date	Opponent	Site/stadium	Score	Win	Loss	Save	Overall record	SoCon Record
May 7	Presbyterian*	Joseph P. Riley Jr. Park • Charleston, SC	W 12–2	Hancock	Felts	None	34–21	
May 10	vs Howard*	Doak Field • Raleigh, NC	W 15–0	Wiley	Thomas	Bunn	35–21	
May 10	at NC State*	Doak Field • Raleigh, NC	L 3–8	Dorn	Rogers	35–22		
May 11	Presbyterian*	Joseph P. Riley Jr. Park • Charleston, SC	W 9–3	Hancock	Burns	None	36–22	

NCAA East Regional
Date	Opponent	Site/stadium	Score	Win	Loss	Save	Overall record	SoConT Record
May 21	(2) No. 18 Clemson	Beautiful Tiger Field • Clemson, SC	L 3–12	White	Rogers	None	36–23	0–1
May 22	(6) Fordham	Beautiful Tiger Field • Clemson, SC	W 5–1	Wiley	Resnick	None	37–23	1–1
May 23	(3) VCU	Beautiful Tiger Field • Clemson, SC	L 2–3^{11}	Inge	Martin	None	37–24	1–2

== 1999 ==
1999 The Citadel Bulldogs baseball

SoCon champion SoCon tournament champion

NCAA Tallahassee Regional, 0–2
- Conference: Southern Conference
- Record: 41–20 (24–5 SoCon)
- Head coach: Fred Jordan (8th season)
- Home stadium: Joseph P. Riley Jr. Park

1999 Southern Conference baseball standings
	Conf.				Overall
Team	W		L	PCT	W		L	PCT
The Citadel ‍†‍‡‍^{y}	24	–	5	.828	41	–	20	.672
College of Charleston ‍‍‍	19	–	10	.655	31	–	24	.564
Western Carolina ‍‍‍	18	–	10	.643	36	–	22	.621
East Tennessee State ‍‍‍	18	–	11	.621	29	–	25	.537
UNC Greensboro ‍‍‍	16	–	12	.571	29	–	26	.527
Georgia Southern ‍‍‍	13	–	15	.464	29	–	29	.500
VMI ‍‍‍	13	–	16	.448	22	–	27	.449
Furman ‍‍‍	13	–	17	.433	22	–	35	.386
Appalachian State ‍‍‍	10	–	20	.333	14	–	38	.269
Davidson ‍‍‍	9	–	21	.300	11	–	37	.229
Wofford ‍‍‍	7	–	23	.233	14	–	36	.280
† – Conference champion ‡ – SoCon Tournament champion y – Invited to the NCAA tournament As of June 30, 1999; Rankings from Collegiate Baseball

=== Roster ===
1999 The Citadel Bulldogs roster
Pitchers: - Ryan Benton; - Kyle Bunn - Junior; - Ron Colvard - Junior; - Randy Corn - Freshman; - Kristiaan de Roos; - Kevin Freeman; - T.A. Fulmer - Freshman; - Matt Hamer - Freshman; - Rodney Hancock - Junior; - Chris Harris; - T. W. Mincey - Freshman; - Clayton Soule; - Brian Wiley - Senior	Catchers: - Jay Morgan - Junior; Infielders: - Aaron Haigler - Senior; - Philip Hartig - Sophomore; - Dallas McPherson - Freshman; - Tavy Smalls - Senior	Outfielders: - Chris Morris - Sophomore	Unknown: - Daryl Byrd - Sophomore; - Matt Dean - Freshman; - Chris Eckert - Sophomore; - David Griffin - Freshman; - Michael Harris; - Johnny Hedges; - Heath Higgins; - Stuart Jordan - Sophomore

=== Coaches ===
1999 The Citadel Bulldogs baseball coaching staff
- Fred Jordan - Head coach - 8th year
- Dan McDonnell - Assistant coach - 7th year
- Chris Lemonis - Assistant coach - 5th year

=== Schedule ===
1999 The Citadel Bulldogs baseball game log: 41–20
Regular season: 37–18

February (3–5)
Date	Opponent	Site/stadium	Score	Win	Loss	Save	Overall record	SoCon Record
Feb 12	Virginia*	Joseph P. Riley Jr. Park • Charleston, SC	L 1–5	Creswell	Wiley	None	0–1	–
Feb 13	NC State*	Joseph P. Riley Jr. Park • Charleston, SC	L 3–5	Baker	Hancock	D'Amato	0–2	–
Feb 14	No. 28 North Carolina*	Joseph P. Riley Jr. Park • Charleston, SC	L 5–8	Richardson	McPherson	Earey	0–3	–
Feb 19	Kentucky*	Joseph P. Riley Jr. Park • Charleston, SC	W 4–1	Wiley	Kent	Bunn	1–3	–
Feb 20	Tennessee*	Joseph P. Riley Jr. Park • Charleston, SC	W 9–1	Hancock	Tisdale	Morgan	2–3	–
Feb 21	No. 16 South Carolina*	Joseph P. Riley Jr. Park • Charleston, SC	L 4–9	Hadden	McPherson	None	2–4	–
Feb 26	vs. Xavier*	Beautiful Tiger Field • Clemson, SC	W 13–12	Bunn	Cutter	None	3–4	–
Feb 27	vs. Western Michigan*	Beautiful Tiger Field • Clemson, SC	L 9–10	Palazeti	Hancock	None	3–5	–

March (11–7)
Date	Opponent	Site/stadium	Score	Win	Loss	Save	Overall record	SoCon Record
Mar 3	at No. 27 Clemson*	Beautiful Tiger Field • Clemson, SC	W 18–15	Morgan	Boozer	None	4–5	–
Mar 6	Connecticut*	Joseph P. Riley Jr. Park • Charleston, SC	L 1–2	Berney	Hancock	None	4–6	–
Mar 6	Connecticut*	Joseph P. Riley Jr. Park • Charleston, SC	W 3–2^{12}	Fulmer	Sperone	None	5–6	–
Mar 7	Connecticut*	Joseph P. Riley Jr. Park • Charleston, SC	W 9–4	Wiley	Fulchino	None	6–6	–
Mar 10	at Charleston Southern*	CSU Ballpark • North Charleston, SC	L 2–3	Tyree	Colvard	None	6–7	–
Mar 13	VMI	Joseph P. Riley Jr. Park • Charleston, SC	W 16–2	Wiley	Barrow	None	7–7	1–0
Mar 13	VMI	Joseph P. Riley Jr. Park • Charleston, SC	W 17–4	McPherson	Spradlin	None	8–7	2–0
Mar 14	VMI	Joseph P. Riley Jr. Park • Charleston, SC	W 8–4	Hancock	Riley	Morgan	9–7	3–0
Mar 16	at No. 1 Florida State*	Dick Howser Stadium • Tallahassee, FL	L 6–10	Ginn	Bunn	None	9–8	–
Mar 17	at No. 1 Florida State*	Dick Howser Stadium • Tallahassee, FL	L 4–8	Diaz	Morgan	None	9–9	–
Mar 20	at Davidson	Wildcat Park • Davidson, NC	W 8–6	Wiley	Stroker	Morgan	10–9	4–0
Mar 20	at Davidson	Wildcat Park • Davidson, NC	W 14–1	McPherson	Self	None	11–9	5–0
Mar 21	at Davidson	Wildcat Park • Davidson, NC	W 11–1	Hancock	Yarborough	None	12–9	6–0
Mar 24	at No. 26 NC State*	Doak Field • Raleigh, NC	L 5–16	D'Amato	Colvard	None	12–10	–
Mar 27	at East Tennessee State	Howard Johnson Field • Johnson City, TN	L 3–5	Harrell	Wiley	None	12–11	6–1
Mar 27	at East Tennessee State	Howard Johnson Field • Johnson City, TN	L 4–5	Baber	Morgan	None	12–12	6–2
Mar 28	at East Tennessee State	Howard Johnson Field • Johnson City, TN	W 7–6	Hancock	McBride	Morgan	13–12	7–2
Mar 30	Troy*	Joseph P. Riley Jr. Park • Charleston, SC	W 8–7	Bunn	Hanson	Morgan	14–12	–

April (14–3)
Date	Opponent	Site/stadium	Score	Win	Loss	Save	Overall record	SoCon Record
Apr 2	Western Carolina	Joseph P. Riley Jr. Park • Charleston, SC	W 4–1	Wiley	Pember	Morgan	15–12	8–2
Apr 3	Western Carolina	Joseph P. Riley Jr. Park • Charleston, SC	W 6–1	Hancock	Kirby	None	16–12	9–2
Apr 3	Western Carolina	Joseph P. Riley Jr. Park • Charleston, SC	W 5–1	McPherson	Overbay	None	17–12	10–2
Apr 7	at No. 24 South Carolina*	Sarge Frye Field • Columbia, SC	L 4–5^{10}	Pomar	Morgan	None	17–13	–
Apr 10	College of Charleston	Joseph P. Riley Jr. Park • Charleston, SC	W 9–1	Wiley	Parker	None	18–13	11–2
Apr 10	College of Charleston	Joseph P. Riley Jr. Park • Charleston, SC	W 7–6	Morgan	Davey	None	19–13	12–2
Apr 11	College of Charleston	Joseph P. Riley Jr. Park • Charleston, SC	L 2–6	Hocker	Hancock	None	19–14	12–3
Apr 13	Winthrop*	Joseph P. Riley Jr. Park • Charleston, SC	W 4–3^{10}	Morgan	Sundsmo	None	20–14	–
Apr 14	Coastal Carolina*	Joseph P. Riley Jr. Park • Charleston, SC	L 2–5	Johnson	Fulmer	None	20–15	–
Apr 17	at UNC Greensboro	UNCG Baseball Stadium • Greensboro, NC	W 16–3	Wiley	Gordon	None	21–15	13–3
Apr 17	at UNC Greensboro	UNCG Baseball Stadium • Greensboro, NC	W 10–6	McPherson	Jackson	None	22–15	14–3
Apr 18	at UNC Greensboro	UNCG Baseball Stadium • Greensboro, NC	W 12–5	Hancock	Gordon	None	23–15	15–3
Apr 21	at Coastal Carolina*	Charles Watson Stadium • Conway, SC	W 4–3	Morgan	Kadlec	Wiley	24–15	–
Apr 24	at Appalachian State	Beaver Field at Jim and Bettie Smith Stadium • Boone, NC	W 12–4	Wiley	Cheek	None	25–15	16–3
Apr 24	at Appalachian State	Beaver Field at Jim and Bettie Smith Stadium • Boone, NC	W 8–5	Morgan	Kelly	None	26–15	18–3
Apr 25	at Appalachian State	Beaver Field at Jim and Bettie Smith Stadium • Boone, NC	W 8–7^{10}	Morgan	Kelly	None	27–15	18–3
Apr 27	at Winthrop*	Winthrop Ballpark • Rock Hill, SC	W 18–4	Colvard	Patterson	Fulmer	28–15	–

May (9–3)
Date	Opponent	Site/stadium	Score	Win	Loss	Save	Overall record	SoCon Record
May 2	Georgia Southern	Joseph P. Riley Jr. Park • Charleston, SC	W 7–6	Bunn	Jones	None	29–15	19–3
May 2	Georgia Southern	Joseph P. Riley Jr. Park • Charleston, SC	W 5–2	Hancock	Roland	None	30–15	20–3
May 5	Charleston Southern*	Joseph P. Riley Jr. Park • Charleston, SC	W 7–3	Bunn	Smith	Morgan	31–15	–
May 8	at Wofford	Duncan Park • Spartanburg, SC	W 7–1	Hancock	Lawton	None	32–15	21–3
May 9	at Wofford	Duncan Park • Spartanburg, SC	L 3–4	Klomparens	Morgan	None	32–16	21–4
May 9	at Wofford	Duncan Park • Spartanburg, SC	W 21–4	Colvard	Hadden	None	33–16	22–4
May 11	Charleston Southern*	Joseph P. Riley Jr. Park • Charleston, SC	L 12–18	Tyree	Fulmer	None	33–17	–
May 11	Charleston Southern*	Joseph P. Riley Jr. Park • Charleston, SC	W 6–3	Morgan	Viars	None	34–17	–
May 12	No. 30 Coastal Carolina*	Joseph P. Riley Jr. Park • Charleston, SC	W 7–1	Bunn	Johnson	None	35–17	–
May 14	Furman	Joseph P. Riley Jr. Park • Charleston, SC	W 24–0 (Note: Hancock threw a no-hitter against Furman on May 14, 1999.)	Hancock	David	None	36–17	23–4
May 15	Furman	Joseph P. Riley Jr. Park • Charleston, SC	W 10–5	McPherson	Bates	None	37–17	24–4
May 15	Furman	Joseph P. Riley Jr. Park • Charleston, SC	L 11–16	Rowland	Fulmer	None	37–18	24–5

Postseason: 4–2

SoCon Tournament (4–0)
Date	Opponent	Seed	Site/stadium	Score	Win	Loss	Save	Overall record	SoConT Record
May 19	(8) Furman	(1)	Joseph P. Riley Jr. Park • Charleston, SC	W 3–0	Hancock	David	None	38–18	1–0
May 20	(4) East Tennessee State	(1)	Joseph P. Riley Jr. Park • Charleston, SC	W 13–5	Wiley	Casey	None	39–18	2–0
May 21	(2) College of Charleston	(1)	Joseph P. Riley Jr. Park • Charleston, SC	W 4–3	Morgan	Black	None	40–18	3–0
May 22	(3) Western Carolina	(1)	Joseph P. Riley Jr. Park • Charleston, SC	W 6–3	Bunn	Pember	None	41–18	4–0

NCAA Tallahassee Regional (0–2)
Date	Opponent	Seed	Site/stadium	Score	Win	Loss	Save	Overall record	NCAAT record
May 28	(1) No. 3 Florida State	(4)	Dick Howser Stadium • Tallahassee, FL	L 6–24	Varnes	Hancock	None	41–19	0–1
May 29	(2) Providence	(4)	Dick Howser Stadium • Tallahassee, FL	L 1–12	Scott	Wiley	None	41–20	0–2

== MLB Draft picks ==
Year	Player	Round	Team
1990	Anthony Jenkins	29	Cardinals
1991	Brad Stowell	30	Athletics
1992	Gettys Glaze	15	Red Sox
1995	Britt Reames	17	Cardinals
1995	Brian Callahan	25	Athletics
1996	Garrick Hattiwanger	11	Mets
1998	Brian Rogers	5	Yankees
1998	Terrence Smalls	24	Marlins
1998	Jarod Simmons	40	Braves
1999	Brian Wiley	15	Red Sox
1999	Rodney Hancock	29	Pirates
