= 1994 Southern Conference baseball tournament =

- Teams: 8
- Format: Double-elimination tournament
- Finals site: College Park (Charleston); Charleston, South Carolina
- Champions: The Citadel (2nd title)
- Winning coach: Fred Jordan (1st title)
- MVP: Jermaine Shuler (The Citadel)

1994 Southern Conference baseball standings
	Conf.				Overall
Team	W		L	PCT	W		L	PCT
Western Carolina ‍†‍‍^{y}	19	–	4	.826	45	–	18	.714
Georgia Southern ‍‍‍	15	–	7	.682	31	–	25	.554
Marshall ‍‍‍	12	–	9	.571	23	–	20	.535
East Tennessee State ‍‍‍	12	–	11	.522	19	–	21	.475
The Citadel ‍‍‡‍^{y}	11	–	13	.458	32	–	34	.485
Appalachian State ‍‍‍	10	–	13	.435	22	–	26	.458
VMI ‍‍‍	10	–	13	.435	21	–	29	.420
Davidson ‍‍‍	10	–	14	.417	20	–	31	.392
Furman ‍‍‍	4	–	19	.174	9	–	35	.205
† – Conference champion ‡ – SoCon Tournament champion y – Invited to the NCAA tournament As of June 30, 1994; Rankings from Collegiate Baseball

The 1994 Southern Conference baseball tournament was held at College Park in Charleston, South Carolina, from April 28 through May 1. Fifth seeded The Citadel won the tournament and earned the Southern Conference's automatic bid to the 1994 NCAA Division I baseball tournament. It was the Bulldogs second tournament win and first under coach Fred Jordan.

The tournament used a double-elimination format. Only the top eight teams participate, so Furman was not in the field.

== Seeding ==
Team	W	L	Pct	GB	Seed
Western Carolina	19	4	.826	–	1
Georgia Southern	15	7	.682	3.5	2
Marshall	12	9	.571	6	3
East Tennessee State	12	11	.522	7	4
The Citadel	11	13	.458	8.5	5
Appalachian State	10	13	.435	9	6
VMI	10	13	.435	9	7
Davidson	10	14	.417	9.5	8
Furman	4	19	.174	15	

== Bracket ==
Upper round 1	Upper round 2	Upper final	Final
1	Western Carolina	1
8	Davidson	2
8	Davidson	4
5	The Citadel	10
4	East Tennessee State	3
5	The Citadel	8
5	The Citadel	4
7	VMI	3
3	Marshall	7
6	Appalachian State	3
3	Marshall	4
7	VMI	6
2	Georgia Southern	4
7	VMI	6	5	The Citadel	4
1	Western Carolina	2
Lower round 1	Lower round 2	Lower round 3	Lower final
3	Marshall	2
1	Western Carolina	4	1	Western Carolina	8	7	VMI	1
4	East Tennessee State	0	1	Western Carolina	13	1	Western Carolina	7
8	Davidson	1
8	Davidson	5
6	Appalachian State	1	2	Georgia Southern	2
2	Georgia Southern	6

== All-Tournament Team ==
Position	Player	School
P	Britt Reames	The Citadel
C	Brett Boretti	Davidson
1B	Marc Striker	Western Carolina
2B	John Connolly	Western Carolina
3B	Bo Betchman	The Citadel
SS	Jermaine Shuler	The Citadel
OF	Garrick Haltiwanger	The Citadel
OF	Mike Tidick	Western Carolina
OF	Louie Napoleon	VMI
DH	Donald Morillo	The Citadel

Walt Nadzak Award, Tournament Most Outstanding Player
Jermaine Shuler
The Citadel
