= 1995 Southern Conference baseball tournament =

- Teams: 8
- Format: Double-elimination tournament
- Finals site: College Park (Charleston); Charleston, South Carolina
- Champions: The Citadel (3rd title)
- Winning coach: Fred Jordan (2nd title)
- MVP: Donald Morillo (The Citadel)

1995 Southern Conference baseball standings
	Conf.				Overall
Team	W		L	PCT	W		L	PCT
The Citadel ‍†‍‡‍^{y}	19	–	5	.792	39	–	19	.672
Georgia Southern ‍‍‍	14	–	10	.583	35	–	24	.593
Western Carolina ‍‍‍	13	–	11	.542	32	–	24	.571
Davidson ‍‍‍	12	–	12	.500	19	–	32	.373
East Tennessee State ‍‍‍	11	–	12	.478	25	–	27	.481
Appalachian State ‍‍‍	10	–	13	.435	17	–	30	.362
VMI ‍‍‍	10	–	14	.417	19	–	28	.404
Marshall ‍‍‍	9	–	15	.375	12	–	38	.240
Furman ‍‍‍	9	–	15	.375	16	–	32	.333
† – Conference champion ‡ – SoCon Tournament champion y – Invited to the NCAA tournament As of June 30, 1995; Rankings from Collegiate Baseball

The 1995 Southern Conference baseball tournament was held at College Park in Charleston, South Carolina, from April 27 through 30. Top seeded The Citadel won the tournament and earned the Southern Conference's automatic bid to the 1995 NCAA Division I baseball tournament. It was the Bulldogs second consecutive tournament win and third overall.

The tournament used a double-elimination format. Only the top eight teams participate, so Furman was not in the field as Marshall owned the tiebreaker.

== Seeding ==
Team	W	L	Pct	GB	Seed
The Citadel	19	5	.792	–	1
Georgia Southern	14	10	.583	5	2
Western Carolina	13	11	.542	6	3
Davidson	12	12	.500	7	4
East Tennessee State	11	12	.478	7.5	5
Appalachian State	10	13	.435	8.5	6
VMI	10	14	.417	9	7
Marshall	9	15	.375	10	8
Furman	9	15	.375	10	

== Bracket ==
Upper round 1	Upper round 2	Upper final	Final
1	The Citadel	5
8	Marshall	1
1	The Citadel	10
5	East Tennessee State	2
4	Davidson	2
5	East Tennessee State	6
1	The Citadel	10
2	Georgia Southern	4
3	Western Carolina	9
6	Appalachian State	5
3	Western Carolina	4
2	Georgia Southern	10
2	Georgia Southern	4
7	VMI	3	1	The Citadel	8
2	Georgia Southern	3
Lower round 1	Lower round 2	Lower round 3	Lower final
3	Western Carolina	10
8	Marshall	8	8	Marshall	3	2	Georgia Southern	9
4	Davidson	5	3	Western Carolina	1	5	East Tennessee State	6
5	East Tennessee State	6
5	East Tennessee State	8
6	Appalachian State	4	7	VMI	4
7	VMI	13

== All-Tournament Team ==
Position	Player	School
P	Britt Reames	The Citadel
C	James Lyons	East Tennessee State
1B	Tommy Peterman	Georgia Southern
2B	David Beckley	The Citadel
3B	Eric Whitson	Western Carolina
SS	Tyson Whitley	Georgia Southern
OF	Len Hart	East Tennessee State
OF	Dale Sistare	The Citadel
OF	Garrick Haltiwanger	The Citadel
DH	Ryan Glynn	VMI

Walt Nadzak Award, Tournament Most Outstanding Player
Donald Morillo
The Citadel
