= 1992 Southern Conference baseball tournament =

- Teams: 8
- Format: Double-elimination tournament
- Finals site: College Park (Charleston); Charleston, South Carolina
- Champions: Western Carolina (6th title)
- MVP: Joey Cox (Western Carolina)

1992 Southern Conference baseball standings
| | Conf. | | | | Overall |
| Team | W | | L | PCT | W | | L | PCT |
|---|---|---|---|---|---|---|---|---|
| No. 17 Western Carolina ^{†‡y} ‍‍‍ | 17 | – | 4 | .810 | 44 | – | 21 | .677 |
| Georgia Southern ‍‍‍ | 15 | – | 6 | .714 | 31 | – | 27 | .534 |
| East Tennessee State ‍‍‍ | 11 | – | 8 | .579 | 31 | – | 20 | .608 |
| The Citadel ‍‍‍ | 10 | – | 9 | .526 | 35 | – | 20 | .636 |
| Furman ‍‍‍ | 11 | – | 10 | .524 | 21 | – | 31 | .404 |
| Appalachian State ‍‍‍ | 6 | – | 14 | .300 | 17 | – | 34 | .333 |
| Marshall ‍‍‍ | 5 | – | 13 | .278 | 15 | – | 26 | .366 |
| VMI ‍‍‍ | 4 | – | 15 | .211 | 11 | – | 39 | .220 |
† – Conference champion ‡ – SoCon Tournament champion y – Invited to the NCAA tournament As of June 30, 1992; Rankings from Collegiate Baseball

The 1992 Southern Conference baseball tournament was held at College Park in Charleston, South Carolina, from April 23 through 27. Top seeded Western Carolina won the tournament and earned the Southern Conference's automatic bid to the 1992 NCAA Division I baseball tournament. It was the Catamounts sixth tournament win.

The tournament used a double-elimination format.

== Seeding ==
The league's teams were seeded one through eight based on regular season conference winning percentage only. There were no ties in the standings, so no tiebreakers were necessary.

| Team | W | L | Pct | GB | Seed |
|---|---|---|---|---|---|
| Western Carolina | 17 | 4 | .810 | – | 1 |
| Georgia Southern | 15 | 6 | .714 | 2 | 2 |
| East Tennessee State | 11 | 8 | .579 | 5 | 3 |
| The Citadel | 10 | 9 | .526 | 6 | 4 |
| Furman | 11 | 10 | .524 | 6 | 5 |
| Appalachian State | 6 | 14 | .300 | 10.5 | 6 |
| Marshall | 5 | 13 | .278 | 10.5 | 7 |
| VMI | 4 | 15 | .211 | 12 | 8 |

== Bracket ==
Upper round 1 | Upper round 2 | Upper final | Final
1 | Western Carolina | 3
8 | VMI | 2
1 | Western Carolina | 2
4 | The Citadel | 1
4 | The Citadel | 6*
5 | Furman | 4*
1 | Western Carolina | 17
2 | Georgia Southern | 10
2 | Georgia Southern | 4
7 | Marshall | 3
2 | Georgia Southern | 7
3 | East Tennessee State | 4
3 | East Tennessee State | 1
6 | Appalachian State | 0 | 1 | Western Carolina | 12 | 4
2 | Georgia Southern | 14 | 3
Lower round 1 | Lower round 2 | Lower round 3 | Lower final
3 | East Tennessee State | 20
8 | VMI | 5 | 8 | VMI | 3 | 2 | Georgia Southern | 9
5 | Furman | 3 | 3 | East Tennessee State | 4 | 4 | The Citadel | 0
4 | The Citadel | 9
4 | The Citadel | 12
7 | Marshall | 7 | 6 | Appalachian State | 3
6 | Appalachian State | 8

* - Indicates game required extra innings

== All-Tournament Team ==
| Position | Player | School |
|---|---|---|
| P | Jim Carragher | Georgia Southern |
| C | Mike Darnell | Georgia Southern |
| 1B | Bryan Wiggins | Georgia Southern |
| 2B | Doug Eder | Georgia Southern |
| 3B | Eric Whitson | Western Carolina |
| SS | Chris Petersen | Georgia Southern |
| OF | Joey Cox | Western Carolina |
| OF | Scott Lyman | Western Carolina |
| OF | Mike Miller | Georgia Southern |
| DH | Gettys Glaze | The Citadel |

Walt Nadzak Award, Tournament Most Outstanding Player
Joey Cox
Western Carolina
