= 1993 Southern Conference baseball tournament =

- Teams: 8
- Format: Double-elimination tournament
- Finals site: College Park (Charleston); Charleston, South Carolina
- Champions: Western Carolina (7th title)
- MVP: Phillip Grundy (Western Carolina)

1993 Southern Conference baseball standings
	Conf.				Overall
Team	W		L	PCT	W		L	PCT
Georgia Southern ‍†‍‍	18	–	5	.783	38	–	21	.644
Western Carolina ‍‍‡‍^{y}	15	–	6	.714	34	–	28	.548
The Citadel ‍‍‍	13	–	9	.591	32	–	25	.561
East Tennessee State ‍‍‍	11	–	8	.579	21	–	17	.553
Davidson ‍‍‍	11	–	9	.550	20	–	28	.417
Appalachian State ‍‍‍	8	–	12	.400	15	–	27	.357
Marshall ‍‍‍	9	–	14	.391	13	–	27	.325
VMI ‍‍‍	5	–	15	.250	20	–	29	.408
Furman ‍‍‍	4	–	16	.200	17	–	22	.436
† – Conference champion ‡ – SoCon Tournament champion y – Invited to the NCAA tournament As of June 30, 1993; Rankings from Collegiate Baseball

The 1993 Southern Conference baseball tournament was held at College Park in Charleston, South Carolina, from April 28 through May 1. Second seeded Western Carolina won the tournament and earned the Southern Conference's automatic bid to the 1993 NCAA Division I baseball tournament. It was the Catamounts seventh tournament win.

The tournament used a double-elimination format. Only the top eight teams participate, so Furman was not in the field.

== Seeding ==
The top eight finishers in the league were seeded based on regular season conference winning percentage only. There were no ties in the standings, so no tiebreakers were needed.

Team	W	L	Pct	GB	Seed
Georgia Southern	18	5	.783	–	1
Western Carolina	15	6	.714	2	2
The Citadel	13	9	.591	4.5	3
East Tennessee State	11	8	.579	5	4
Davidson	11	9	.550	5.5	5
Appalachian State	8	12	.400	8.5	6
Marshall	9	14	.391	9	7
VMI	5	15	.250	11.5	8
Furman	4	16	.200	12.5	–

== Bracket ==
Upper round 1	Upper round 2	Upper final	Final
1	Georgia Southern	1
8	VMI	8
8	VMI	15
5	Davidson	5
4	East Tennessee State	5
5	Davidson	12
8	VMI	8
2	Western Carolina	4
2	Western Carolina	7
7	Marshall	6
2	Western Carolina	6
3	The Citadel	3
3	The Citadel	7
6	Appalachian State	1	8	VMI	5	1
2	Western Carolina	12	5
Lower round 1	Lower round 2	Lower round 3	Lower final
3	The Citadel	6
1	Georgia Southern	10	1	Georgia Southern	9	2	Western Carolina	6
4	East Tennessee State	3	1	Georgia Southern	12	1	Georgia Southern	5
5	Davidson	5
5	Davidson	10
7	Marshall	4	7	Marshall	1
6	Appalachian State	2

== All-Tournament Team ==
Position	Player	School
P	Jason Beverlin	Western Carolina
C	Roy Hurst	Western Carolina
1B	Chris Lemonis	The Citadel
2B	Matt Wilson	Georgia Southern
3B	Louie Napoleon	VMI
SS	David Groseclose	VMI
OF	Rob Doherty	Western Carolina
OF	Dale Sistare	The Citadel
OF	Mike Tidick	Western Carolina
DH	Phillip Grundy	Western Carolina

Walt Nadzak Award, Tournament Most Outstanding Player
Phillip Grundy
Western Carolina
