= 1991 Southern Conference baseball tournament =

- Teams: 7
- Format: Double-elimination tournament
- Finals site: College Park (Charleston); Charleston, South Carolina
- Champions: Furman (1st title)
- MVP: Brent Williams (Furman)

1991 Southern Conference baseball standings
| | Conf. | | | | Overall |
| Team | W | | L | PCT | W | | L | PCT |
|---|---|---|---|---|---|---|---|---|
| The Citadel ‍†‍‍ | 16 | – | 2 | .889 | 34 | – | 19 | .642 |
| Western Carolina ‍‍‍ | 11 | – | 3 | .786 | 36 | – | 26 | .581 |
| Marshall ‍‍‍ | 9 | – | 7 | .563 | 16 | – | 26 | .381 |
| Furman ‍‍‡‍^{y} | 6 | – | 5 | .545 | 26 | – | 26 | .500 |
| Appalachian State ‍‍‍ | 5 | – | 8 | .385 | 28 | – | 21 | .571 |
| East Tennessee State ‍‍‍ | 5 | – | 13 | .278 | 23 | – | 29 | .442 |
| VMI ‍‍‍ | 1 | – | 15 | .063 | 2 | – | 35 | .054 |
† – Conference champion ‡ – SoCon Tournament champion y – Invited to the NCAA tournament As of June 30, 1991; Rankings from Collegiate Baseball

The 1991 Southern Conference baseball tournament was held at College Park in Charleston, South Carolina, from April 27 through 30. Fourth seeded Furman won the tournament and earned the Southern Conference's automatic bid to the 1991 NCAA Division I baseball tournament. It was the Paladins first tournament win.

The tournament used a double-elimination format, with top seeded The Citadel receiving a bye to the second day in order to compensate for the odd number of teams in the league.

== Seeding ==
| Team | W | L | Pct | GB | Seed |
|---|---|---|---|---|---|
| The Citadel | 16 | 2 | .889 | – | 1 |
| Western Carolina | 11 | 3 | .786 | 3 | 2 |
| Marshall | 9 | 7 | .563 | 6 | 3 |
| Furman | 6 | 5 | .545 | 6.5 | 4 |
| Appalachian State | 5 | 8 | .385 | 8.5 | 5 |
| East Tennessee State | 5 | 13 | .278 | 11 | 6 |
| VMI | 1 | 15 | .063 | 14 | 7 |

== Results ==
=== Bracket ===
Bracket to be included

=== Game results ===
| Date | Game | Winner | Score | Loser | Notes |
|---|---|---|---|---|---|
| April 27 | 1 | Western Carolina | 18–2 | VMI | |
| April 27 | 2 | East Tennessee State | 14–4 | Marshall | |
| April 27 | 3 | Appalachian State | 4–2 | Furman | |
| April 28 | 4 | Furman | 10–4 | Marshall | Marshall eliminated |
| April 28 | 5 | East Tennessee State | 7–4 | Western Carolina | |
| April 28 | 6 | Appalachian State | 2–0 | The Citadel | |
| April 28 | 7 | Furman | 8–3 | VMI | VMI eliminated |
| April 29 | 8 | Western Carolina | 7–3 | The Citadel | The Citadel eliminated |
| April 29 | 9 | Appalachian State | 7–1 | East Tennessee State | |
| April 29 | 10 | Western Carolina | 9–4 | East Tennessee State | East Tennessee State eliminated |
| April 29 | 11 | Furman | 7–6 (10) | Appalachian State | |
| April 30 | 12 | Western Carolina | 4–0 | Appalachian State | Appalachian State eliminated |
| April 30 | 13 | Furman | 11–9 | Western Carolina | Furman wins SoCon Tournament |

== All-Tournament Team ==
| Position | Player | School |
|---|---|---|
| P | Jack Kimel | Western Carolina |
| C | Brent Williams | Furman |
| 1B | Rodney Tesh | Western Carolina |
| 2B | John Key | Appalachian State |
| 3B | Matt Raleigh | Western Carolina |
| SS | Nathan Dunn | East Tennessee State |
| OF | Kevin Bellomo | Western Carolina |
| OF | Joey Cox | Western Carolina |
| OF | Scott Waugh | Appalachian State |
| DH | Dallas Rhinehart | East Tennessee State |

Walt Nadzak Award, Tournament Most Outstanding Player
Brent Williams
Furman
