= 1997 Southern Conference baseball tournament =

- Teams: 8
- Format: Double-elimination tournament
- Finals site: Joseph P. Riley Jr. Park; Charleston, South Carolina
- Champions: Western Carolina (8th title)
- MVP: J. P. Burnwell (Western Carolina)
- Attendance: 15,295

1997 Southern Conference baseball standings
	Conf.				Overall
Team	W		L	PCT	W		L	PCT
Western Carolina ‍†‍‡‍^{y}	18	–	6	.750	42	–	20	.677
Georgia Southern ‍†‍‍	18	–	6	.750	34	–	26	.567
The Citadel ‍‍‍	16	–	7	.696	37	–	21	.638
Furman ‍‍‍	13	–	11	.542	29	–	23	.558
East Tennessee State ‍‍‍	11	–	11	.500	21	–	24	.467
Davidson ‍‍‍	8	–	15	.348	18	–	34	.346
Appalachian State ‍‍‍	8	–	16	.333	16	–	32	.333
VMI ‍‍‍	6	–	13	.316	13	–	35	.271
Marshall ‍‍‍	4	–	17	.190	7	–	39	.152
† – Conference champion ‡ – SoCon Tournament champion y – Invited to the NCAA tournament As of June 30, 1997; Rankings from Collegiate Baseball

The 1997 Southern Conference baseball tournament was held at Joseph P. Riley Jr. Park in Charleston, South Carolina, from April 30 through May 3. Top seeded Western Carolina won the tournament and earned the Southern Conference's automatic bid to the 1997 NCAA Division I baseball tournament. It was the Catamounts eighth tournament win. This was the first tournament to be held at Riley Park, which opened as the home venue of The Citadel for the 1997 season.

The tournament used a double-elimination format. Only the top eight teams participated, so Marshall was not in the field. This was Marshall's last season in the conference, as they joined the Mid-American Conference prior to the 1997–98 season.

== Seeding ==
Team	W	L	Pct	GB	Seed
Western Carolina	18	6	.667	–	1
Georgia Southern	18	6	.667	–	2
The Citadel	16	7	.696	1.5	3
Furman	13	11	.542	5	4
East Tennessee State	11	11	.500	6	5
Davidson	8	15	.348	9.5	6
Appalachian State	8	16	.333	10	7
VMI	6	13	.316	10.5	8
Marshall	4	17	.190	12.5	–

== Bracket ==
Upper round 1	Upper round 2	Upper final	Final
4	Furman	6
5	East Tennessee State	2
4	Furman	1
1	Western Carolina	7
1	Western Carolina	4
8	VMI	3
1	Western Carolina	10
3	The Citadel	3
2	Georgia Southern	14
7	Appalachian State	5
2	Georgia Southern	5
3	The Citadel	14
3	The Citadel	18
6	Davidson	8	1	Western Carolina	10*
4	Furman	9*
Lower round 1	Lower round 2	Lower round 3	Lower final
3	Georgia Southern	14
5	East Tennessee State	7*	5	East Tennessee State	11	3	The Citadel	2
8	VMI	3*	3	Georgia Southern	10	4	Furman	4
4	Furman	12
4	Furman	13*
7	Appalachian State	7	7	Appalachian State	11*
6	Davidson	5

* - Indicates extra innings.

== All-Tournament Team ==
Position	Player	School
P	David Noyce	Furman
C	J. P. Burwell	Western Carolina
1B	Ryan Butler	The Citadel
2B	Jeff Sziksai	Western Carolina
3B	Dan Martz	Furman
SS	Eric Boehmer	Furman
OF	Rodney Hancock	The Citadel
OF	Jody Wade	Furman
OF	Brandon Hollier	Furman
DH	Tyson Whitley	Georgia Southern

Walt Nadzak Award, Tournament Most Outstanding Player
J. P. Burwell
Western Carolina
