= 1996 Southern Conference baseball tournament =

- Teams: 8
- Format: Double-elimination tournament
- Finals site: College Park (Charleston); Charleston, South Carolina
- Champions: Georgia Southern (1st title)
- MVP: Mark Hamiln (Georgia Southern)

1996 Southern Conference baseball standings
	Conf.				Overall
Team	W		L	PCT	W		L	PCT
No. 14 Georgia Southern ^{†‡y} ‍‍‍	17	–	3	.850	46	–	14	.767
Western Carolina ‍‍‍	17	–	7	.708	32	–	24	.571
Furman ‍‍‍	15	–	9	.625	26	–	29	.473
The Citadel ‍‍‍	13	–	10	.565	33	–	26	.559
Appalachian State ‍‍‍	12	–	10	.545	27	–	19	.587
East Tennessee State ‍‍‍	11	–	12	.478	26	–	24	.520
VMI ‍‍‍	7	–	16	.304	17	–	29	.370
Davidson ‍‍‍	6	–	18	.250	16	–	33	.327
Marshall ‍‍‍	4	–	17	.190	7	–	35	.167
† – Conference champion ‡ – SoCon Tournament champion y – Invited to the NCAA tournament As of June 30, 1996; Rankings from Collegiate Baseball

The 1996 Southern Conference baseball tournament was held at College Park in Charleston, South Carolina, from April 30 through May 3. Top seeded Georgia Southern won the tournament and earned the Southern Conference's automatic bid to the 1996 NCAA Division I baseball tournament. It was the Eagles first tournament win, having joined the league for the 1991 season. This was the final tournament held at College Park, as Joseph P. Riley Jr. Park opened and hosted the tournament beginning in 1997.

The tournament used a double-elimination format. Only the top eight teams participated, so Marshall was not in the field.

== Seeding ==
Team	W	L	Pct	GB	Seed
Georgia Southern	17	3	.850	–	1
Western Carolina	17	7	.708	2	2
Furman	15	9	.625	4	3
The Citadel	13	10	.565	5.5	4
Appalachian State	12	10	.545	6	5
East Tennessee State	11	12	.478	7.5	6
VMI	7	16	.304	11.5	7
Davidson	6	18	.250	13	8
Marshall	4	17	.190	12.5	–

== Bracket ==
Upper round 1	Upper round 2	Upper final	Final
3	Furman	7
6	East Tennessee State	10
6	East Tennessee State	2
7	VMI	4
2	Western Carolina	3
7	VMI	7
7	VMI	2
1	Georgia Southern	11
1	Georgia Southern	8
8	Davidson	2
1	Georgia Southern	4
4	The Citadel	3
4	The Citadel	6
5	Appalachian State	2	1	Georgia Southern	7
4	The Citadel	1
Lower round 1	Lower round 2	Lower round 3	Lower final
4	The Citadel	17
3	Furman	7	3	Furman	3	7	VMI	5
2	Western Carolina	4	4	The Citadel	1	4	The Citadel	8
6	East Tennessee State	0
6	East Tennessee State	5
8	Davidson	2	5	Appalachian State	2
5	Appalachian State	5

* - Indicates extra innings.

== All-Tournament Team ==
Position	Player	School
P	Clint Sauls	Georgia Southern
C	Steve Wilson	Georgia Southern
1B	Nate Shepperson	VMI
2B	Donnie Coe	Georgia Southern
3B	Bo Betchman	The Citadel
SS	Terrance Smalls	The Citadel
OF	Jon Placko	Furman
OF	Mark Hamlin	Georgia Southern
OF	Antoine Moran	Georgia Southern
DH	Britt Phelps	East Tennessee State

Walt Nadzak Award, Tournament Most Outstanding Player
Mark Hamlin
Georgia Southern
