= Charleston Pirates =

Minor league baseball team based in Charleston, South Carolina

- 1973–1978; Charleston, South Carolina

Minor league affiliations
- Class: Class A (1973-1978)
- League: Western Carolinas League (1973–1978)

Major league affiliations
- Team: Pittsburgh Pirates (1973–1978)

Team data
- Name: Charleston Pirates (1978); Charleston Patriots (1976–1977); Charleston Pirates (1973–1975)
- Ballpark: College Park (1973–1978)

The Charleston Pirates were a minor league baseball club based in Charleston, South Carolina, and played at College Park from 1973 to 1978. They were an affiliate of the Pittsburgh Pirates, in the class-A Western Carolinas League. In 1976 and 1977, the team played as the Charleston Patriots.

Future Major Leaguers Willie Randolph, John Candelaria, Dale Berra, Dave Dravecky, Steve Farr, Odell Jones, Rick Lancellotti, Steve Nicosia, Junior Ortiz, Tony Pena, Pascual Pérez, and Ed Whitson played for the Charleston Pirates/Patriots franchise.

The Charleston Pirates ceased operations following the 1978 season, and were replaced in the Western Carolinas League by the Greensboro Hornets. The Pittsburgh Pirates changed their affiliation to the Shelby Pirates.

Charleston regained a minor league team in the Class-A South Atlantic League in 1980, the Charleston Royals. As of 2025, the team still exists as the Charleston RiverDogs of the Carolina League.

== Season results ==
Year	Record	Finish	Manager	Playoffs
1973	72-52	1st	Chuck Cottier	
1974	71-60	2nd	Larry Sherry	No playoffs
1975	45-96	4th	Mike Ryan	No playoffs
1976	59-80	3rd	Mike Ryan	
1977	53-87	6th	Jim Mahoney	
1978	47-93	6th	Billy Scripture	No playoffs
