= Georgia Southern Eagles baseball =

- 2026 Georgia Southern Eagles baseball team
- Founded: 1933
- University: Georgia Southern University
- Head coach: Rodney Hennon (27th season)
- Conference: Sun Belt; East Division
- Location: Statesboro, GA
- Home stadium: J. I. Clements Stadium (capacity: 3,000)
- Nickname: Eagles
- Colors: Blue and white

College World Series appearances
- 1973, 1990

NCAA regional champions
- 1990

NCAA tournament appearances
- 1973, 1974, 1979, 1980, 1987, 1990, 1996, 2000, 2001, 2002, 2009, 2011, 2014, 2022

Conference tournament champions
- SoCon: 1996, 2000, 2002, 2009, 2011, 2014; TAAC: 1980, 1985, 1986, 1987

The Georgia Southern Eagles baseball team is the intercollegiate baseball team representing Georgia Southern University. It began in 1933. The program competes in NCAA Division I. The team is led by head coach Rodney Hennon, who is in his 27th year at Georgia Southern. The Eagles are part of the Sun Belt Conference.

== Team highlights ==
The team went to the College World Series in 1973 and 1990 and has appeared in 13 NCAA regionals. The Eagles were the NAIA National Champions in 1962, sweeping Portland State. The Eagles won 9 SoCon Championships, coming in 1993, 1996, 1997, 2000, 2001, 2002, 2009, 2011, and 2014. The last of these championships came in the Eagles' final season in the Southern Conference before joining the Sun Belt. In 2008, the Eagles set an NCAA record when they hit 14 home runs in a single game against Columbia. In 2022, the Eagles were selected to host a Regional, the first in school history.

== Georgia Southern in the NCAA tournament ==
Year	Record	Pct	Notes
1973	4–3	.571	College World Series 5th place, District 3 Champions
1974	2–2	.500	District 3
1979	1–2	.333	Atlantic Regional
1980	0–2	.000	Atlantic Regional
1987	2–2	.500	Atlantic Regional
1990	4–3	.571	College World Series 7th place, Midwest Regional Champions
1996	1–2	.333	Atlantic Regional
2000	0–2	.000	Atlanta Regional
2001	1–2	.333	Athens Regional
2002	1–2	.333	Clemson Regional
2009	0–2	.000	Fullerton Regional
2011	0–2	.000	Columbia Regional
2014	1–2	.333	Tallahassee Regional
2022	1–2	.333	Hosted Statesboro Regional
TOTALS	18-30	.375	

== J. I. Clements Stadium ==
J. I. Clements Stadium, built in 2005, is the home venue of the program. It is named after former Eagles coach J. I. Clements and has a capacity of 3,000 spectators.

== Retired numbers ==
- #1 (former head coach Jack Stallings)
- #20 (All-America Todd Greene)

== Notable players ==
- Everett Teaford (Kansas City Royals)
- Victor Roache, All-American outfielder
- Eric Phillips, (Toronto Blue Jays )

== See also ==
- List of NCAA Division I baseball programs
