= College Park (Charleston) =

Stadium in Charleston, South Carolina, US

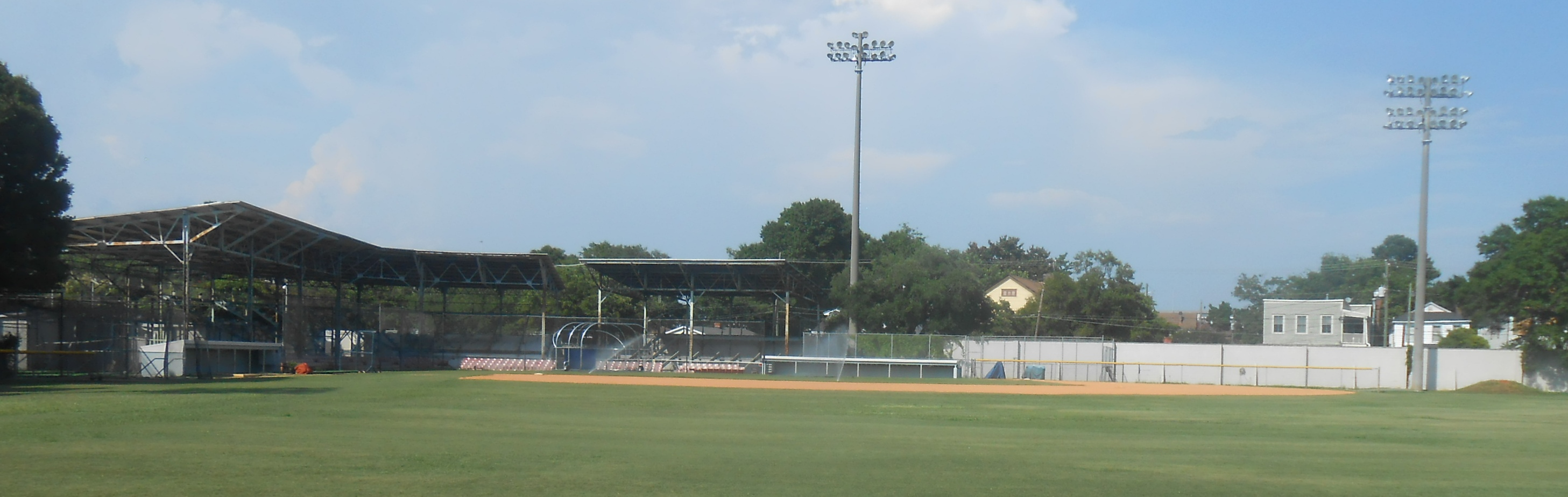
- Interactive map of College Park
- Location: SW Corner of Grove Street and Rutledge Avenue
- Coordinates: 32.802363°N 79.953673°W
- Owner: The Citadel
- Operator: City of Charleston
- Capacity: 6,200 (1946); 5,500 (1949); 4,000 (1994)
- Field size: Left Field 315 feet (96 m); Center Field: 410 feet (120 m); Right Field: 295 feet (90 m)

Construction
- Groundbreaking: 1939
- Opened: 1940
- Closed: 1996

Tenants
- Charleston Rebels (1940–1953); Charleston White Sox (1959–61); Charleston Pirates/Patriots (1973–1978); Charleston Royals/Rainbows/RiverDogs (1980–1996); The Citadel Bulldogs (1967–1996)

College Park is a stadium in Charleston, South Carolina. It was primarily used for baseball and was the home of Charleston RiverDogs. It is currently used by the Citadel Bulldogs baseball team for practice. The ballpark has a capacity of 4,000 people and opened in 1940. The grandstand is constructed of metal bleachers and is largely covered by a roof. The first few rows of seats between the dugouts are situated below ground level, giving fans the rare perspective seen from dugout level.

== History ==
The site has been used as an athletic field since at least 1907, when the northeast section of Hampton Park was leased by the City of Charleston to the College of Charleston for baseball. At least one previous stadium stood on the site prior to the one that stands today. That stadium served as the home of The Citadel Bulldogs football until the construction of the original Johnson Hagood Stadium in 1927.

The facility was reworked in 1940. The field was reoriented to its current configuration; previously, the outfield had been where the grandstands are now. The grandstands, which had been built in 1928 at nearby Stoney Field, were dismantled and reconstructed at College Park. On April 1, 1940, an exhibition baseball game was held between the Cincinnati Reds and the Boston Red Sox, during which Ted Williams hit the first home run at the new park.

The baseball field was nearly converted into a clothing factory in 1918 during World War I. In September 1918, the Navy expressed an interest in buying the site to build a four-acre clothing factory. On September 9, 1918, the Navy submitted its request for the baseball park. The City agreed to the lease the next day in a deal which would have provided for a twenty-year lease with an option to buy at the end. Because World War I ended soon after the deal was struck, it was decided that there was no need for the factory, and plans were dropped.

In order to construct a new baseball stadium, the City of Charleston negotiated a land swap with The Citadel which gained the city a plot on the banks of the Ashley River in return for College Park. Major conditions of the deal included permanent playing rights at the new stadium for The Citadel Bulldogs baseball team and that The Citadel preserve College Park as a baseball stadium through the opening of the new stadium.

== Stadium Usage ==
Elvis Presley played a concert at College Park on June 28, 1956, to a crowd of 4,000.

College Park was the primary shooting location for the 1998 film Major League: Back to the Minors, in which it was called "Buzz Stadium."

College Park hosted some of baseball's greatest players of all time including Ty Cobb and Shoeless Joe Jackson.

College Park said goodbye to professional baseball in 1996 when the Class A Charleston RiverDogs left the stadium for Joseph P. Riley Jr. Park, a new facility on the banks of the Ashley River in Charleston.

The stadium was home to 1990 The Citadel Bulldogs baseball team for their memorable College World Series run. That season also began nineteen consecutive years of Charleston hosting the Southern Conference baseball tournament, which followed the Bulldogs move to Riley Park in 1997.

Charleston's Burke High School played its home games at College Park for the 2013 season while their own stadium was under construction.

== Current Usage ==
The stadium is used as a practice facility by The Citadel Bulldogs, especially when Riley Stadium is unavailable, and used by many community teams during the season. Other community events are also held throughout the year. The Citadel has considered using the facility for women's soccer, which the school began sponsoring as a varsity sport in 2001.
