= Davidson Wildcats baseball =

- 2026 Davidson Wildcats baseball team
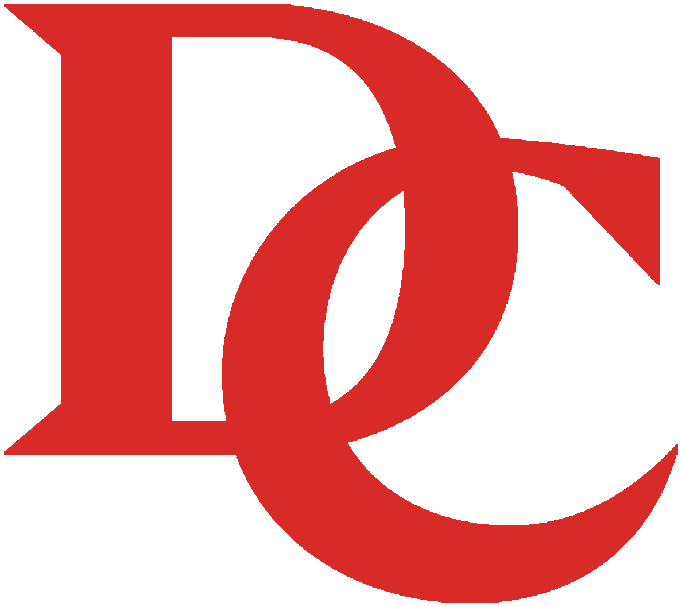
- Founded: 1902; 124 years ago
- University: Davidson College
- Head coach: Rucker Taylor (8th season)
- Conference: Atlantic 10
- Location: Davidson, North Carolina
- Home stadium: T. Henry Wilson Jr. Field (capacity: 700)
- Nickname: Wildcats
- Colors: Red and black

NCAA regional champions
- 2017

NCAA tournament appearances
- 2017

Conference tournament champions
- 2017

Conference regular season champions
- 2022

For information on all Davidson College sports, see Davidson Wildcats

The Davidson Wildcats baseball team is a varsity intercollegiate athletic team of Davidson College in Davidson, North Carolina, United States. The team is a member of the Atlantic 10 Conference, which is part of the National Collegiate Athletic Association's Division I. Davidson's first baseball team was fielded in 1902. The team plays its home games at T. Henry Wilson, Jr. Field in Davidson, North Carolina. The Wildcats are coached by Rucker Taylor.

== Davidson in the NCAA Tournament ==
Year	Record	Pct	Notes
2017	3–2	.600	College Station Super Regional, Chapel Hill Regional Champions
TOTALS	3–2	.600	

== See also ==
- List of NCAA Division I baseball programs
