= East Tennessee State Buccaneers baseball =

East Tennessee State Buccaneers
- 2026 East Tennessee State Buccaneers baseball team
- Founded: 1946
- Overall record: 1422–1510–6 (.485)
- University: East Tennessee State University
- Head coach: Joe Pennucci (9th season)
- Conference: Southern Conference
- Location: Johnson City, Tennessee
- Home stadium: Thomas Stadium (Capacity: 1,028)
- Nickname: Buccaneers
- Colors: Navy blue and gold

NCAA tournament appearances
- 1978, 1980, 1981, 2013, 2025

Conference tournament champions
- Atlantic Sun: 2013; SoCon: 2025

Conference regular season champions
- SoCon: 1980, 1981, 2025

The East Tennessee State Buccaneers baseball team is the varsity intercollegiate athletic team of the East Tennessee State University in Johnson City, Tennessee, United States. The team competes in the National Collegiate Athletic Association's Division I and is a member of the Southern Conference.

== NCAA Tournament ==
East Tennessee State has made the NCAA Division I baseball tournament four times. They have a record of 3–10.

Year	Region	Opponent	Result
1978	South Regional	North Carolina; Memphis	L 1–15; L 0–5
1980	Atlantic Regional	Clemson; Georgia Southern; South Carolina	L 4–22; W 2–1; L 5–8
1981	Atlantic Regional	Mississippi State; Clemson; Wichita State; Mississippi State	L 6–7; W 2–1; W 5–4; L 5–6
2013	Nashville Regional	Vanderbilt; Georgia Tech	L 1–9; L 1–5
2025	Nashville Regional	Louisville; Wright State	L 3–8; L 5–7

== Year-by-year results ==
Statistics overview
Season	Coach	Overall	Conference	Standing	Postseason
1946	Jim Mooney	7–3			
1947	Jim Mooney	7–3			
1948	Jim Mooney	10–4			
1949	Jim Mooney	7–8			
1950	Jim Mooney	9–6			
1951	Jim Mooney	10–7			
1952	Jim Mooney	9–5			
1953	Jim Mooney	5–6–1			
1954	Jim Mooney	8–4			
1955	Jim Mooney	4–6			
1956	Jim Mooney	7–6–1			
1957	Jim Mooney	4–10			
1958	Jim Mooney	5–7			
1959	Jim Mooney	7–9			
Ohio Valley Conference (1960–1978)
1960	Jim Mooney	7–7–1			
1961	Jim Mooney	8–9			
1962	Jim Mooney	11–9	5–5	2nd _{(Eastern)}	
1963	Jim Mooney	8–9	3–7	4th _{(Eastern)}	
1964	Jim Mooney	5–14	2–10	4th _{(Eastern)}	
1965	Jim Mooney	4–14	1–9	4th _{(Eastern)}	
1966	Joe Shipley	5–12	2–10	4th _{(Eastern)}	
1967	Joe Shipley	12–14	6–6	2nd _{(Eastern)}	
1968	Joe Shipley	8–13	5–5	3rd _{(Eastern)}	
1969	Joe Shipley	10–13	5–5	2nd _{(Eastern)}	
1970	Joe Shipley	8–16	3–9	4th _{(Eastern)}	
1971	Joe Shipley	5–11			
1972	Joe Shipley	12–7			
1973	Joe Shipley	5–11	4–7	3rd (Eastern)	
1974	Joe Shipley	6–9	4–6	4th (Eastern)	
1975	Joe Shipley	6–13	5–7	3rd (Eastern)	
1976	Joe Shipley	5–19	3–9	4th (Eastern)	
1977	Joe Shipley	7–14	6–6	4th (Eastern)	
1978	Charley Lodes	29–19	8–3	1st (Eastern)	1978 NCAA Regional
Southern Conference (1979–2005)
1979	Charley Lodes	29–23	10–5	3rd	
1980	Charley Lodes	39–7–1	14–1	1st	1980 NCAA Regional
1981	Charley Lodes	44–17	12–4	T-1st	1981 NCAA Regional
1982	Charley Lodes	34–19	10–4	3rd	
1983	Charley Lodes	20–18	9–3	2nd	
1984	Harold Stout	9–19	3–9	4th (North)	
1985	Harold Stout	9–32	3–14	4th (North)	
1986	Harold Stout	21–21	9–9	2nd (North)	
1987	Harold Stout	9–19–1	1–11	4th (North)	
1988	Harold Stout	16–35	7–11	4th (North)	
1989	Harold Stout	10–29	5–10	7th	
1990	Ken Campbell	10–31	4–12	7th	
1991	Ken Campbell	23–29	5–13	6th	
1992	Ken Campbell	31–20	11–8	3rd	
1993	Ken Campbell	21–17	11–8	4th	
1994	Ken Campbell	19–21	12–11	4th	
1995	Ken Campbell	25–27–1	11–12–1	5th	
1996	Ken Campbell	26–24	11–12	6th	
1997	Ken Campbell	21–24	11–11	5th	
1998	Ken Campbell	18–31	8–18	8th	
1999	Ken Campbell	29–25	18–11	4th	
2000	Tony Skole	21–31	15–15	5th	
2001	Tony Skole	23–32	13–17	7th	
2002	Tony Skole	21–36	13–16	T-8th	
2003	Tony Skole	15–36	9–20	9th	
2004	Tony Skole	28–30	15–15	6th	
2005	Tony Skole	31–22	13–16	T-7th	
Atlantic Sun Conference (2006–2014)
2006	Tony Skole	31–27	14–16	T-5th	
2007	Tony Skole	26–29	11–16	9th	
2008	Tony Skole	18–38	9–24	12th	
2009	Tony Skole	25–28	10–20	9th	
2010	Tony Skole	32–28	15–12	3rd	
2011	Tony Skole	36–21	16–12	5th	
2012	Tony Skole	23–32	8–19	9th	
2013	Tony Skole	36–24	17–10	4th	2013 NCAA Regional
2014	Tony Skole	27–30	13–13	5th	
Southern Conference (2015–present)
2015	Tony Skole	21–35	8–16	9th	
2016	Tony Skole	27–30	11–13	5th	
2017	Tony Skole	30–29	9–15	7th	
2018	Joe Pennucci	28–25	11–13	6th	
2019	Joe Pennucci	34–29	11–12	6th	
2020	Joe Pennucci	12–3	0–0		(Season cut short due to the COVID-19 pandemic)
2021	Joe Pennucci	24–25	13–16	2nd (Blue)	
2022	Joe Pennucci	30–21	11–10	5th	
2023	Joe Pennucci	26–29	10–11	4th	
2024	Joe Pennucci	36–20	13–8	T-3rd	
2025	Joe Pennucci	38–15	14–7	1st	
Ohio Valley:			62–104		
Atlantic Sun:			113–142		
SoCon:			374–417–1		
Total:		1422–1510–6			
National champion Postseason invitational champion Conference regular season champion Conference regular season and conference tournament champion Division regular season champion Division regular season and conference tournament champion Conference tournament champion
