= The Citadel Bulldogs baseball, 1980–1989 =

American college baseball seasons

The Citadel Bulldogs baseball teams represented The Citadel, The Military College of South Carolina in Charleston, South Carolina, United States. The program was established in 1899, and has continuously fielded a team since 1947. Their primary rivals are College of Charleston, Furman and VMI.

== 1980 ==
1980 The Citadel Bulldogs baseball
- Conference: Southern Conference
- Record: 23–14 (9–6 SoCon)
- Head coach: Chal Port (16th season)
- Home stadium: College Park

1980 Southern Conference baseball standings
	Conf.				Overall
Team	W		L	PCT	W		L	PCT
No. 22 East Tennessee State ‍†‍‍^{y}	14	–	1	.933	39	–	7	.848
Marshall ‍‍‍	10	–	3	.769	17	–	11	.607
Appalachian State ‍‍‍	10	–	5	.667	17	–	19	.472
Western Carolina ‍‍‍	8	–	5	.615	22	–	15	.595
The Citadel ‍‍‍	9	–	6	.600	23	–	14	.622
Davidson ‍‍‍	7	–	8	.467	15	–	24	.385
Furman ‍‍‍	2	–	10	.167	7	–	22	.241
Chattanooga ‍‍‍	1	–	11	.083	12	–	20	.375
VMI ‍‍‍	0	–	12	.000	4	–	22	.154
y – Invited to the NCAA tournament As of June 30, 1980; Rankings from Collegiate Baseball

=== Roster ===
1980 The Citadel Bulldogs roster
Pitchers: - Alan Hurt - Freshman; - Jeff Barkley - Sophomore; - Dwight Butler; - Terry Hufstetler; - Mike Pendleton - Junior; - Tony Ramsay - Sophomore	Catchers Infielders: - Marty Blair - Freshman; - Mike Knox - Freshman; - Bill White - Freshman; Outfielders	Unknown: - David Bonville; - Vinnie Franco; - Kip Hagwood - Junior; - Brad Johnson - Freshman; - Steve Kinelski; - Bob Marion; - Calvin Mason - Senior; - Mike Matulia - Freshman; - Mark Mitchum - Senior; - Tracey Shrader - Sophomore; - Whitney Smith; - Randy Yarchever

=== Coaches ===
1980 The Citadel Bulldogs baseball coaching staff
- Chal Port - Head coach - 16th year

=== Schedule ===
1980 The Citadel Bulldogs baseball game log
Regular season

February/March
Date	Opponent	Site/Stadium	Score	Win	Loss	Save	Overall Record	SoCon Record
Feb 23	North Carolina*	College Park • Charleston, SC	L 3–4	Ochal	Rivera	Parks	0–1	
Feb 24	North Carolina*	College Park • Charleston, SC	L 1–4	Hammond	Barkley	None	0–2	
Mar 4	Campbell*	College Park • Charleston, SC	W 11–1	Barkley	Summerlin	None	1–2	
Mar 7	Old Dominion*	College Park • Charleston, SC	W 5–0	Pendleton	August	None	2–2	
Mar 7	Old Dominion*	College Park • Charleston, SC	L 1–2	Walker	Rivera	None	2–3	
Mar 13	Allen*	College Park • Charleston, SC	W 14–2	Barkley	Howard	None	3–3	
Mar 14	Shepherd*	College Park • Charleston, SC	W 11–6	Ramsay	Russell	None	4–3	
Mar 15	Shepherd*	College Park • Charleston, SC	W 7–3	Pendleton	Mahoney	None	5–3	
Mar 15	Shepherd*	College Park • Charleston, SC	W 4–1	Rivera	Rutherford	McElwee	6–3	
Mar 22	Muhlenberg*	College Park • Charleston, SC	W 7–6	McElwee	Kwiatkoski	None	7–3	
Mar 22	Muhlenberg*	College Park • Charleston, SC	W 6–1	Hufstetler	LiGregni	None	8–3	
Mar 24	Chattanooga	College Park • Charleston, SC	W 6–5	Pendleton	Spires	None	9–3	1–0
Mar 24	Chattanooga	College Park • Charleston, SC	W 8–5	Barkley	Gailer	None	10–3	2–0
Mar 26	USC Aiken*	College Park • Charleston, SC	W 2–1	Rivera	Wiggins	None	11–3	

April
Date	Opponent	Site/Stadium	Score	Win	Loss	Save	Attendance	Overall Record	SoCon Record
Apr 2	VMI	College Park • Charleston, SC	W 11–0	Pendleton	Davis	None	12–3	3–0	
Apr 2	VMI	College Park • Charleston, SC	W 3–1	Barkley	Fritz	None	13–3	4–0	
Apr 5	at Marshall	St. Cloud Commons • Huntington, WV	L 0–9	Campbell	Pendleton	13–4	4–1		
Apr 5	at Marshall	St. Cloud Commons • Huntington, WV	L 4–11	Nelson	Barkley	None	13–5	4–2	
Apr 9	Davis & Elkins*	College Park • Charleston, SC	W 10–6	McElwee	Shoemaker	Pendleton	14–5		
Apr 10	Davis & Elkins*	College Park • Charleston, SC	W 3–1	Rivera	Freiburg	None	15–5		
Apr 11	at Presbyterian*	Clinton, SC	W 6–3	Hufstetler	Montgomery	None	16–5		
Apr 12	at Davidson	Wildcat Field • Davidson, NC	W 5–2	Pendleton	Bishop	None	17–5	5–2	
Apr 15	Furman	College Park • Charleston, SC	W 11–2	Barkley	Jones	None	18–5	6–2	
Apr 17	at South Carolina*	Sarge Frye Field • Columbia, SC	L 2–5	Calvert	Rivera	None	18–6		
Apr 19	at Appalachian State	Lackey Field • Boone, NC	L 2–4	Sacco	Pendleton	None	18–7	6–3	
Apr 20	at Appalachian State	Lackey Field • Boone, NC	W 7–3	Barkley	Farmer	None	19–7	7–3	
Apr 21	at East Tennessee State	Howard Johnson Field • Johnson City, TN	L 0–2	Andrews	McElwee	None	19–8	7–4	
Apr 21	at East Tennessee State	Howard Johnson Field • Johnson City, TN	L 1–4	Kowalski	Rivera	None	19–9	7–5	
Apr 23	at Coastal Carolina*	Charles Watson Stadium • Conway, SC	W 5–1	Pendleton	Snyder	None	20–9		
Apr 25	USC Aiken*	College Park • Charleston, SC	L 8–13	Riley	Rivera	20–10			
Apr 26	Western Carolina	College Park • Charleston, SC	L 4–5	Stadler	McElwee	None	20–11	7–6	
Apr 26	Western Carolina	College Park • Charleston, SC	W 7–6	Barkley	Sims	None	21–11	8–6	
Apr 28	at Furman	Latham Baseball Stadium • Greenville, SC	W 8–6	Pendleton	Jones	None	22–11	9–6	
Apr 30	Coastal Carolina*	College Park • Charleston, SC	L 7–14	Lee	Butler	None	22–12		

May
Date	Opponent	Site/Stadium	Score	Win	Loss	Save	Attendance	Overall Record	SoCon Record
May 1	South Carolina*	College Park • Charleston, SC	W 8–6	McElwee	Kucharski	None	23–12		
May 2	Baptist*	College Park • Charleston, SC	L 1–3	Moore	Pendleton	None	23–13		
May 3	at Baptist*	CSU Ballpark • North Charleston, SC	L 1–3	Catoe	Barkley	None	23–14		

== 1981 ==
1981 The Citadel Bulldogs baseball
- Conference: Southern Conference
- Record: 31–13 (11–5 SoCon)
- Head coach: Chal Port (17th season)
- Home stadium: College Park

1981 Southern Conference baseball standings
	Conf.				Overall
Team	W		L	PCT	W		L	PCT
No. 17 East Tennessee State ‍†‍‍^{y}	12	–	4	.750	44	–	17	.721
Western Carolina ‍‍‍	12	–	4	.750	25	–	14	.641
Marshall ‍‍‍	12	–	4	.750	22	–	17	.564
The Citadel ‍‍‍	11	–	5	.688	31	–	13	.705
Appalachian State ‍‍‍	8	–	8	.500	35	–	17	.673
Davidson ‍‍‍	7	–	9	.438	18	–	26	.409
Chattanooga ‍‍‍	6	–	10	.375	28	–	24	.538
Furman ‍‍‍	4	–	12	.250	11	–	33	.250
VMI ‍‍‍	0	–	16	.000	3	–	37	.075
y – Invited to the NCAA tournament As of June 30, 1981; Rankings from Collegiate Baseball

=== Roster ===
1981 The Citadel Bulldogs roster
Pitchers: - Jeff Barkley - Junior; - Hugh Bates; - Dwight Butler; - Mike Cherry - Freshman; - Alan Hurt - Sophomore; - Steve LeBlanc; - Doug Miller; - David Mills - Freshman; - Mike Pendleton - Senior; - Tony Ramsay - Junior; - Frank Wodoslawsky	Catchers Infielders: - Marty Blair - Sophomore; - Mike Knox - Sophomore; - John Murphy - Freshman; - Bill White - Sophomore; Outfielders	Unknown: - Tony Austin; - Gresham Barrett - Sophomore; - Joe Finkelstein; - Kip Hagwood - Senior; - Tommy Henson; - Brad Johnson - Sophomore; - Steve Kinelski; - Willie Lane; - Bob Marion; - Mike Matulia - Sophomore; - Tracey Shrader - Junior; - Whitney Smith; - Randy Yarchever; - Kevin Young

=== Coaches ===
1981 The Citadel Bulldogs baseball coaching staff
- Chal Port - Head coach - 17th year

=== Schedule ===
1981 The Citadel Bulldogs baseball game log
Regular season

February
Date	Opponent	Site/Stadium	Score	Win	Loss	Save	Overall Record	SoCon Record
Feb 21	Clemson*	College Park • Charleston, SC	L 0–6	Key	Barkley	Gilbert	0–1	
Feb 22	Clemson*	College Park • Charleston, SC	L 3–6	Parrish	Wodoslawsky	None	0–2	
Feb 28	North Carolina*	College Park • Charleston, SC	L 1–2	Ochal	Barkley	Parks	0–3	

March
Date	Opponent	Site/Stadium	Score	Win	Loss	Save	Overall Record	SoCon Record
Mar 1	North Carolina*	College Park • Charleston, SC	L 11–14	Droshack	Pendleton	Parks	0–4	
Mar 7	at Presbyterian*	Clinton, SC	W 21–0	Ramsay	Trollinger	None	1–4	
Mar 7	at Presbyterian*	Clinton, SC	W 15–0	Cherry	Montgomery	None	2–4	
Mar 8	at USC Aiken*	Allendale, SC	L 3–4^{10}	Wiggins	Butler	None	2–5	
Mar 9	Guilford*	College Park • Charleston, SC	W 14–8	Wodoslawsky	Mackie	None	3–5	
Mar 10	Guilford*	College Park • Charleston, SC	W 9–3	Hurt	Richardson	None	4–5	
Mar 12	at Baptist*	CSU Ballpark • North Charleston, SC	W 11–1	Barkley	Petty	None	5–5	
Mar 14	Presbyterian*	College Park • Charleston, SC	W 15–3	Ramsay	Montgomery	None	6–5	
Mar 14	Presbyterian*	College Park • Charleston, SC	W 12–1	Hurt	Cox	None	7–5	
Mar 19	Lafayette*	College Park • Charleston, SC	L 9–18	Weigel	Wodoslawsky	None	7–6	
Mar 20	Shepherd*	College Park • Charleston, SC	W 9–1	Pendleton	Holmes	None	8–6	
Mar 21	Shepherd*	College Park • Charleston, SC	W 15–0	Ramsay	Rutherford	None	9–6	
Mar 21	Shepherd*	College Park • Charleston, SC	W 18–1	Hurt	Johns	None	10–6	
Mar 23	Salisbury State*	College Park • Charleston, SC	W 3–1	Barkley	Seemann	None	11–6	
Mar 24	Wake Forest*	College Park • Charleston, SC	W 7–4	Pendleton	Warner	None	12–6	
Mar 26	Hiram*	College Park • Charleston, SC	W 15–3	Wodoslawsky	Rowan	None	13–6	
Mar 27	Hiram*	College Park • Charleston, SC	W 4–1	Ramsay	Gruber	Barkley	14–6	
Mar 28	at Allen*	Columbia, SC	W 21–6	Cherry	Glenn	None	15–6	
Mar 30	Stetson*	College Park • Charleston, SC	W 2–0	Barkley	Hamilton	None	16–6	

April/May
Date	Opponent	Site/Stadium	Score	Win	Loss	Save	Overall Record	SoCon Record
Apr 1	at South Carolina*	Sarge Frye Field • Columbia, SC	L 6–8	Leopard	Pendleton	None	16–7	
Apr 4	at VMI	Patchin Field • Lexington, VA	W 7–1	Ramsay	Airaghi	None	17–7	1–0
Apr 4	at VMI	Patchin Field • Lexington, VA	W 17–3	Hurt	Wharton	None	18–7	2–0
Apr 6	at Western Carolina	Hennon Stadium • Cullowhee, NC	W 8–7	Pendleton	Robinson	None	19–7	3–0
Apr 6	at Western Carolina	Hennon Stadium • Cullowhee, NC	W 5–0	Barkley	Stadler	None	20–7	4–0
Apr 8	Allen*	College Park • Charleston, SC	W 13–5	Cherry	Walker	None	21–7	
Apr 11	Davidson	College Park • Charleston, SC	L 3–4	Ransom	Butler	None	21–8	4–1
Apr 11	Davidson	College Park • Charleston, SC	W 4–3	Barkley	Colechia	None	22–8	5–1
Apr 13	at Chattanooga	Chattanooga, TN	W 5–2	Pendleton	Lindsey	None	23–8	6–1
Apr 13	at Chattanooga	Chattanooga, TN	L 0–1	Spires	Barkley	None	23–9	6–2
Apr 15	at Coastal Carolina*	Charles Watson Stadium • Conway, SC	W 6–4	Ramsay	Luther	None	24–9	
Apr 16	USC Aiken*	College Park • Charleston, SC	W 14–1	Hurt	Guy	None	25–9	
Apr 18	East Tennessee State	College Park • Charleston, SC	L 4–10	Graves	Pendleton	None	25–10	6–3
Apr 18	East Tennessee State	College Park • Charleston, SC	W 5–0	Barkley	Bartley	None	26–10	7–3
Apr 22	South Carolina*	College Park • Charleston, SC	L 4–7	Gordon	Pendleton	Babel	26–11	
Apr 25	at Furman	Latham Baseball Stadium • Greenville, SC	W 12–7	Ramsay	Obert	None	27–11	8–3
Apr 25	at Furman	Latham Baseball Stadium • Greenville, SC	W 9–3	Hurt	Schlenk	None	28–11	9–3
Apr 27	Marshall	College Park • Charleston, SC	L 3–5	Sullivan	Barkley	Nelson	28–12	9–4
Apr 27	Marshall	College Park • Charleston, SC	L 3–6	Montgomery	Pendleton	None	28–13	9–5
Apr 29	Coastal Carolina*	College Park • Charleston, SC	W 8–2	Hurt	Gebhardt	None	29–13	
May 2	Appalachian State*	College Park • Charleston, SC	W 11–10	Pendleton	Warfield	None	30–13	10–5
May 2	Appalachian State	College Park • Charleston, SC	W 17–5	Barkley	Bailey	None	31–13	11–5

== 1982 ==
1982 The Citadel Bulldogs baseball

Southern Conference champions

NCAA East Regional
- Conference: Southern Conference
- Record: 40–8 (14–2 SoCon)
- Head coach: Chal Port (18th season)
- Home stadium: College Park

1982 Southern Conference baseball standings
	Conf.				Overall
Team	W		L	PCT	W		L	PCT
No. 23 The Citadel ‍†‍‍^{y}	12	–	4	.750	40	–	8	.833
Western Carolina ‍†‍‍	12	–	4	.750	28	–	12	.700
East Tennessee State ‍‍‍	10	–	4	.714	34	–	19	.642
Appalachian State ‍‍‍	8	–	8	.500	30	–	21	.588
Marshall ‍‍‍	8	–	8	.500	17	–	21	.447
VMI ‍‍‍	6	–	10	.375	11	–	29	.275
Furman ‍‍‍	4	–	10	.286	15	–	19	.441
Chattanooga ‍‍‍	4	–	10	.286	12	–	20	.375
Davidson ‍‍‍	2	–	12	.143	13	–	26	.333
y – Invited to the NCAA tournament As of June 30, 1982; Rankings from Collegiate Baseball

=== Roster ===
1982 The Citadel Bulldogs roster
Pitchers: - Jeff Barkley - Senior; - Dwight Butler; - Mike Cherry - Sophomore; - Don Dennis; - Alan Hurt - Junior; - David Mills - Sophomore; - David Prosser - Freshman; - Tony Ramsay - Senior; - Bill Sullivan; - Frank Wodoslawsky	Catchers Infielders: - Tim Jones - Freshman; - Mike Knox - Junior; - John Murphy - Sophomore; - Bill White - Junior; Outfielders	Unknown: - Marty Blair - Junior; - Rich Collins - Freshman; - Joe Finkelstein; - Brad Johnson - Junior; - Jack Korpar - Freshman; - Willie Lane; - Bob Marion; - Mike Matulia - Junior; - Doug McNairy - Freshman; - David Mills; - Jimmy Nicholson - Freshman; - Tracey Shrader - Senior; - Whitney Smith; - Marcos Wardlaw

=== Coaches ===
1982 The Citadel Bulldogs baseball coaching staff
- Chal Port - Head coach - 18th year

=== Schedule ===
1982 The Citadel Bulldogs baseball game log
Regular season

February
Date	Opponent	Site/Stadium	Score	Win	Loss	Save	Overall Record	SoCon Record
Feb 18	Washington & Lee*	College Park • Charleston, SC	W 17–2	Cherry	Randall	None	1–0	
Feb 19	Washington & Lee*	College Park • Charleston, SC	W 8–1	Hurt	Hachenburg	None	2–0	
Feb 28	North Carolina*	College Park • Charleston, SC	W 14–1	Barkley	Powell	None	3–0	
Feb 28	North Carolina*	College Park • Charleston, SC	L 5–6	McGuire	Cherry	Huffman	3–1	

March
Date	Opponent	Site/Stadium	Score	Win	Loss	Save	Overall Record	SoCon Record
Mar 6	at Clemson*	Beautiful Tiger Field • Clemson, SC	L 7–20	Wiles	Barkley	None	3–2	
Mar 8	at Coastal Carolina*	Charles Watson Stadium • Conway, SC	W 10–5	Cherry	Zmudowsky	None	4–2	
Mar 10	at Georgia State*	Atlanta, GA	W 19–1	Hurt	Pfeffer	None	5–2	
Mar 11	at Georgia State*	Atlanta, GA	W 8–2	Wodoslawsky	Dean	None	6–2	
Mar 13	Shippensburg*	College Park • Charleston, SC	W 10–4	Cherry	Serafini	None	7–2	
Mar 14	Shippensburg*	College Park • Charleston, SC	W 1–0^{10}	Wodoslawsky	Reed	None	8–2	
Mar 15	Chattanooga	College Park • Charleston, SC	W 5–1	Barkley	Jones	None	9–2	1–0
Mar 15	Chattanooga	College Park • Charleston, SC	W 12–1	Hurt	Trotter	None	10–2	2–0
Mar 19	Shepherd*	College Park • Charleston, SC	W 16–2	Wodoslawsky	Yentsch	None	11–2	
Mar 20	Shepherd*	College Park • Charleston, SC	W 14–1	Ramsay	Weitzenfield	Mills	12–2	
Mar 20	Shepherd*	College Park • Charleston, SC	W 8–1	Hurt	Russell	None	13–2	
Mar 22	Salisbury State*	College Park • Charleston, SC	W 8–0	Barkley	Willey	None	14–2	
Mar 27	Furman	College Park • Charleston, SC	W 3–2	Barkley	Criswell	None	15–2	3–0
Mar 27	Furman	College Park • Charleston, SC	W 5–3	Hurt	Cheek	None	16–2	4–0
Mar 29	VMI	College Park • Charleston, SC	W 11–2	Ramsay	Augsburger	None	17–2	5–0
Mar 29	VMI	College Park • Charleston, SC	W 8–0	'Cherry	Airaghi	None	18–2	6–0
Mar 31	Benedict*	College Park • Charleston, SC	W 14–0	Sullivan	Taylor	None	19–2	

April/May
Date	Opponent	Site/Stadium	Score	Win	Loss	Save	Overall Record	SoCon Record
Apr 1	at Baptist*	CSU Ballpark • North Charleston, SC	W 5–1	Wodoslawsky	Ellisor	None	20–2	
Apr 4	at Marshall	St. Cloud Commons • Huntington, WV	W 12–9	Wodoslawsky	Montgomery	Cherry	21–2	7–0
Apr 4	at Marshall	St. Cloud Commons • Huntington, WV	W 11–8	Hurt	Mavis	None	22–2	8–0
Apr 5	at Davidson	Wildcat Field • Davidson, NC	W 6–3	Barkley	Barnes	None	23–2	9–0
Apr 5	at Davidson	Wildcat Field • Davidson, NC	W 27–8	Cherry	Whitesides	None	24–2	10–0
Apr 10	Western Carolina	College Park • Charleston, SC	W 4–0	Barkley	Mashburn	None	25–2	11–0
Apr 10	Western Carolina	College Park • Charleston, SC	L 1–3	Sims	Hurt	None	25–3	11–1
Apr 11	at Presbyterian*	Clinton, SC	W 10–0	Cherry	Montgomery	None	26–3	
Apr 11	at Presbyterian*	Clinton, SC	W 14–0	Ramsay	Wilson	None	27–3	
Apr 15	vs USC Aiken*	Allendale, SC	W 7–1	Hurt	Seiple	Cherry	28–3	
Apr 17	at Appalachian State	Lackey Field • Boone, NC	W 2–1	Barkley	Bailey	None	29–3	12–1
Apr 17	at Appalachian State	Lackey Field • Boone, NC	L 4–5	Poston	Barkley	None	29–4	12–2
Apr 19	at East Tennessee State	Howard Johnson Field • Johnson City, TN	W 13–8	Hurt	Pierce	None	30–4	13–2
Apr 19	at East Tennessee State	Howard Johnson Field • Johnson City, TN	W 3–2	Cherry	Brintle	None	31–4	14–2
Apr 21	Coastal Carolina*	College Park • Charleston, SC	W 4–2	Ramsay	Zmudowsky	Sullivan	32–4	
Apr 23	at Benedict*	Columbia, SC	W 10–4	Wodoslawsky	Holmes	None	33–4	
Apr 24	Presbyterian*	College Park • Charleston, SC	W 9–2	Hurt	McCallum	None	34–4	
Apr 24	Presbyterian*	College Park • Charleston, SC	W 8–1	Sullivan	Bourne	None	35–4	
Apr 26	South Carolina*	College Park • Charleston, SC	L 0–1	Gordon	Barkley	None	35–5	
Apr 28	at South Carolina*	Sarge Frye Field • Columbia, SC	L 4–8	Lubert	Wodoslawsky	None	35–6	
Apr 29	Baptist*	College Park • Charleston, SC	W 9–0	Cherry	Ellisor	None	36–6	
May 18	at North Carolina Wesleyan*	Rocky Mount, NC	W 5–4	Barkley	Rhodes	Mills	37–6	
May 19	at Methodist*	Fayetteville, NC	W 6–4	Prosser	Boswell	Sullivan	38–6	

Post-Season

NCAA East Regional
Date	Opponent	Site/Stadium	Score	Win	Loss	Save	Overall Record	NCAAT Record
May 27	North Carolina	Sarge Frye Field • Columbia, SC	W 9–4	Barkley	Bankhead	None	39–6	1–0
May 28	South Carolina	Sarge Frye Field • Columbia, SC	L 4–6	Gordon	Cherry	Babel	39–7	1–1
May 29	Old Dominion	Sarge Frye Field • Columbia, SC	W 15–1	Wodoslawsky	Toll	None	40–7	2–1
May 30	South Carolina	Sarge Frye Field • Columbia, SC	L 2–11	Lubert	Hurt	None	40–8	2–2

== 1983 ==
1983 The Citadel Bulldogs baseball

Southern Conference champions

NCAA East Regional
- Conference: Southern Conference
- Record: 34–10 (12–2 SoCon)
- Head coach: Chal Port (19th season)
- Home stadium: College Park

1983 Southern Conference baseball standings
	Conf.				Overall
Team	W		L	PCT	W		L	PCT
No. 21 The Citadel ‍†‍‍^{y}	12	–	2	.857	34	–	10	.773
East Tennessee State ‍‍‍	9	–	3	.750	20	–	18	.526
Western Carolina ‍‍‍	9	–	5	.643	25	–	20	.556
Appalachian State ‍‍‍	7	–	7	.500	33	–	14	.702
Marshall ‍‍‍	7	–	7	.500	19	–	14	.576
VMI ‍‍‍	5	–	9	.357	11	–	25	.306
Davidson ‍‍‍	3	–	11	.214	11	–	24	.314
Furman ‍‍‍	2	–	10	.167	4	–	22	.154
y – Invited to the NCAA tournament As of June 30, 1983; Rankings from Collegiate Baseball

=== Roster ===
1983 The Citadel Bulldogs roster
Pitchers: - Mike Cherry - Junior; - Rich Collins - Sophomore; - Tom Griffin; - John Hargette; - Barry Hatfield; - Alan Hurt - Senior; - Bobby Mills; - David Mills - Junior; - David Prosser - Sophomore; - Brett Sanders - Freshman; - Bill Sullivan	Catchers Infielders: - Rick Hardwick - Freshman; - Tim Jones - Sophomore; - John Murphy - Junior; Outfielders: - Lee Glaze - Freshman	Unknown: - Marty Blair - Senior; - Joe Finkelstein; - Brad Johnson - Senior; - Jack Korpar - Sophomore; - Willie Lane; - Mike Matulia - Senior; - Doug McNairy - Sophomore; - Jimmy Nicholson - Sophomore; - Ken Vickery - Freshman; - Marcos Wardlaw

=== Coaches ===
1983 The Citadel Bulldogs baseball coaching staff
- Chal Port - Head coach - 19th year

=== Schedule ===
1983 The Citadel Bulldogs baseball game log
Regular season

February
Date	Opponent	Site/Stadium	Score	Win	Loss	Save	Overall Record	SoCon Record
Feb 19	Clemson*	College Park • Charleston, SC	W 3–1	Cherry	Wiles	None	1–0	
Feb 20	Clemson*	College Park • Charleston, SC	W 6–2	Hurt	Pawlowski	None	2–0	
Feb 26	North Carolina*	College Park • Charleston, SC	W 6–5	Mills	Reid	None	3–0	
Feb 27	North Carolina*	College Park • Charleston, SC	L 8–9	Karpuk	Hurt	Douglas	3–1	

March
Date	Opponent	Site/Stadium	Score	Win	Loss	Save	Overall Record	SoCon Record
Mar 5	Elizabethtown*	College Park • Charleston, SC	W 10–2	Sanders	Bickel	Sullivan	4–1	
Mar 7	at Mercer*	Claude Smith Field • Macon, GA	L 3–4	Stone	Hurt	None	4–2	
Mar 7	at Mercer*	Claude Smith Field • Macon, GA	W 9–2	Cherry	Hanlon	None	5–2	
Mar 9	at Piedmont*	Athens, GA	W 9–5	Mills	Dixon	None	6–2	
Mar 9	at Piedmont*	Athens, GA	W 17–2	Sullivan	Walker	None	7–2	
Mar 11	at USC Aiken*	Aiken, SC	W 10–2	Hurt	Parks	None	8–2	
Mar 12	at Augusta State*	Augusta, GA	W 7–4	Cherry	Snead	None	9–2	
Mar 19	Shepherd*	College Park • Charleston, SC	W 8–0	Sullivan	Butts	None	10–2	
Mar 19	Shepherd*	College Park • Charleston, SC	W 6–0	Mills	Yentsch	None	11–2	
Mar 21	Salisbury State*	College Park • Charleston, SC	W 2–1	Hurt	Peterson	None	12–2	
Mar 21	Salisbury State*	College Park • Charleston, SC	W 16–2	Cherry	Doyle	None	13–2	
Mar 22	Hiram*	College Park • Charleston, SC	W 12–2	Collins	Cammett	None	14–2	
Mar 25	North Adams State*	College Park • Charleston, SC	W 11–6	Sullivan	O'Sullivan	None	15–2	
Mar 26	Marshall	College Park • Charleston, SC	W 5–3	Cherry	Montgomery	None	16–2	1–0
Mar 26	Marshall	College Park • Charleston, SC	W 6–0	Hurt	Wullenweber	None	17–2	2–0
Mar 29	USC Aiken*	College Park • Charleston, SC	W 15–6	Sullivan	Vance	None	18–2	

April/May
Date	Opponent	Site/Stadium	Score	Win	Loss	Save	Overall Record	SoCon Record
Apr 4	Benedict*	College Park • Charleston, SC	W 9–0	Forfeit			19–2	
Apr 7	Coastal Carolina*	College Park • Charleston, SC	W 2–1	Cherry	Clemons	None	20–2	
Apr 10	at Catawba*	Salisbury, NC	W 7–3	Mills	Meyers	None	21–2	
Apr 10	at Catawba*	Salisbury, NC	W 8–4	Sullivan	Gibbs	None	22–2	
Apr 11	Davidson	College Park • Charleston, SC	W 5–2	Hurt	Barnes	None	23–2	3–0
Apr 11	Davidson	College Park • Charleston, SC	W 13–1	Cherry	Walker	None	24–2	4–0
Apr 13	at Coastal Carolina*	Charles Watson Stadium • Conway, SC	L 3–6	Clemons	Sullivan	None	24–3	
Apr 14	at South Carolina*	Sarge Frye Field • Columbia, SC	L 1–5	Parmenter	Mills	None	24–4	
Apr 16	East Tennessee State	College Park • Charleston, SC	W 5–3	Cherry	Burke	None	25–4	5–0
Apr 16	East Tennessee State	College Park • Charleston, SC	L 5–7	McKinley	Hurt	25–5	5–1	
Apr 19	Appalachian State	College Park • Charleston, SC	W 3–0	Mills	Bosley	None	26–5	6–1
Apr 19	Appalachian State	College Park • Charleston, SC	W 4–3	Cherry	Hardee	None	27–5	7–1
Apr 20	South Carolina*	College Park • Charleston, SC	L 0–8	Parmenter	Collins	None	27–6	
Apr 25	at VMI	Patchin Field • Lexington, VA	W 5–0	Mills	Airaghi	None	28–6	8–1
Apr 25	at VMI	Patchin Field • Lexington, VA	W 6–4	Cherry	Augsburger	None	29–6	9–1
Apr 28	at Furman	Furman Baseball Stadium • Greenville, SC	W 10–0	Sullivan	Schlenk	None	30–6	10–1
Apr 28	at Furman	Furman Baseball Stadium • Greenville, SC	W 14–1	Hurt	Fagan	None	31–6	11–1
Apr 29	Augusta State	College Park • Charleston, SC	L 6–9	Mercer	Prosser	McKinney	31–7	
May 1	at Western Carolina	Hennon Stadium • Cullowhee, NC	W 8–7	Cherry	Moore	None	32–7	12–1
May 1	at Western Carolina	Hennon Stadium • Cullowhee, NC	L 1–2	Robinson	Mills	None	32–8	12–2

Post-Season

NCAA East Regional
Date	Opponent	Site/Stadium	Score	Win	Loss	Save	Overall Record	NCAAT Record
May 27	Delaware	Boshamer Stadium • Chapel Hill, NC	W 14–5	Cherry	Johnston	None	33–8	1–0
May 28	North Carolina	Boshamer Stadium • Chapel Hill, NC	W 5–3	Mills	Williams	Collins	34–8	2–0
May 28	James Madison	Boshamer Stadium • Chapel Hill, NC	L 2–5	Foster	Sullivan	None	34–9	2–1
May 29	Delaware	Boshamer Stadium • Chapel Hill, NC	L 1–7	Schaab	Hurt	None	34–10	2–2

== 1984 ==
1984 The Citadel Bulldogs baseball
- Conference: Southern Conference
- Record: 26–21 (12–5 SoCon)
- Head coach: Chal Port (20th season)
- Home stadium: College Park

1984 Southern Conference baseball standings
	Conf.				Overall
Team	W		L	PCT	W		L	PCT
Northern
Appalachian State ^{x}‍‍‡‍^{y}	12	–	2	.857	35	–	7	.833
VMI ‍‍‍	6	–	7	.462	16	–	18	.471
Marshall ‍‍‍	5	–	8	.385	11	–	16	.407
East Tennessee State ‍‍‍	3	–	9	.250	9	–	19	.321
Southern
Western Carolina ^{x}‍‍‍	13	–	3	.813	37	–	20	.649
The Citadel ‍‍‍	12	–	5	.706	26	–	21	.553
Davidson ‍‍‍	5	–	12	.294	12	–	16	.429
Furman ‍‍‍	4	–	14	.222	16	–	19	.457
x – Division champion ‡ – SoCon Tournament champion y – Invited to the NCAA tournament As of June 30, 1984; Rankings from Collegiate Baseball

=== Roster ===
1984 The Citadel Bulldogs roster
Pitchers: - Chris Bengel - Freshman; - Rich Collins - Junior; - Tom Griffin; - John Hargette; - Barry Hatfield; - Clifton Jones; - Russell Lott; - David Mills - Senior; - Mike Montei - Freshman; - David Prosser - Junior; - Bill Sullivan	Catchers Infielders: - Rick Hardwick - Sophomore; - Tim Jones - Junior; - John Murphy - Senior; Outfielders: - Lee Glaze - Sophomore	Unknown: - Doug Emery; - Ricky Green - Freshman; - Jack Korpar - Junior; - Doug McNairy - Junior; - Jamie Mixon; - Jimmy Nicholson - Junior; - Steve Sobczak - Freshman; - Chris Stadler; - Joel Thompson - Freshman; - Ken Vickery - Sophomore; - Marcos Wardlaw

=== Coaches ===
1984 The Citadel Bulldogs baseball coaching staff
- Chal Port - Head coach - 20th year

=== Schedule ===
1984 The Citadel Bulldogs baseball game log
Regular season

February/March
Date	Opponent	Site/Stadium	Score	Win	Loss	Save	Overall Record	SoCon Record
Feb 25	North Carolina*	College Park • Charleston, SC	L 0–3	Bankhead	Collins	Mulligan	0–1	
Feb 26	North Carolina*	College Park • Charleston, SC	L 3–10	Williams	Montei	None	0–2	
Mar 3	Elizabethtown*	College Park • Charleston, SC	W 4–1	Mills	Nolt	Collins	1–2	
Mar 4	VCU*	College Park • Charleston, SC	L 2–8	Bryant	Bengel	None	1–3	
Mar 6	at Clemson*	Beautiful Tiger Field • Clemson, SC	W 7–4	Griffin	Pawlowski	None	2–3	
Mar 6	at Clemson*	Beautiful Tiger Field • Clemson, SC	L 0–6	Parrish	Sullivan	None	2–4	
Mar 7	NC State*	College Park • Charleston, SC	L 3–7	Sigmon	Mills	None	2–5	
Mar 8	Wingate*	College Park • Charleston, SC	W 4–2	Bengel	Morgan	None	3–5	
Mar 9	Wingate*	College Park • Charleston, SC	L 7–9^{13}	Beatty	Collins	None	3–6	
Mar 10	West Liberty*	College Park • Charleston, SC	W 18–0	Jones	Billick	None	4–6	
Mar 11	West Liberty*	College Park • Charleston, SC	W 9–2	Montei	Simpson	None	5–6	
Mar 15	USC Aiken*	College Park • Charleston, SC	L 2–5	Edwards	Griffin	Mertens	5–7	
Mar 17	Davidson	College Park • Charleston, SC	W 3–0	Mills	Weaver	None	6–7	1–0
Mar 17	Davidson	College Park • Charleston, SC	W 4–3	Bengel	Waitsman	Collins	7–7	2–0
Mar 18	Davidson	College Park • Charleston, SC	W 8–7	Collins	Condon	Mills	8–7	3–0
Mar 19	Howard*	College Park • Charleston, SC	W 7–2	Montei	White	None	9–7	
Mar 21	North Adams State*	College Park • Charleston, SC	L 1–4	Rowe	Mills	None	9–8	
Mar 22	Hiram*	College Park • Charleston, SC	W 14–2	Jones	Cammett	None	10–8	
Mar 24	at Western Carolina	Hennon Stadium • Cullowhee, NC	L 1–2	Hare	Bengel	None	10–9	3–1
Mar 24	at Western Carolina	Hennon Stadium • Cullowhee, NC	L 4–7	Gay	Mills	Slaughter	10–10	3–2
Mar 25	at Western Carolina	Hennon Stadium • Cullowhee, NC	L 3–8	Milewski	Montei	None	10–11	3–3
Mar 27	at Coastal Carolina*	Charles Watson Stadium • Conway, SC	L 4–8	Ames	Mills	None	10–12	
Mar 30	at Furman	Furman Baseball Stadium • Greenville, SC	W 8–5	Mills	Burnett	Collins	11–12	4–3
Mar 31	at Furman	Furman Baseball Stadium • Greenville, SC	W 9–5	Bengel	Hlay	None	12–12	5–3
Mar 31	at Furman	Furman Baseball Stadium • Greenville, SC	W 6–1	Montei	Doubleday	None	13–12	6–3

April
Date	Opponent	Site/Stadium	Score	Win	Loss	Save	Overall Record	SoCon Record
Apr 1	Coastal Carolina*	College Park • Charleston, SC	W 7–5	Prosser	Buckley	Collins	14–12	
Apr 4	at USC Aiken*	Aiken, SC	L 4–5	Murden	Collins	None	14–13	
Apr 5	at Augusta State*	Augusta, GA	W 11–8	Montei	Thompson	None	15–13	
Apr 7	at Davidson	Wildcat Field • Davidson, NC	W 15–6	Mills	Waitsman	None	16–13	7–3
Apr 7	at Davidson	Wildcat Field • Davidson, NC	W 9–0	Bengel (Note: Chris Bengel threw a no-hitter.)	Redding	None	17–13	8–3
Apr 8	at Davidson	Wildcat Field • Davidson, NC	L 8–10	Weaver	Montei	None	17–14	8–4
Apr 12	UNC Wilmington*	College Park • Charleston, SC	L 2–3	Davidson	Jones	None	17–15	
Apr 14	Western Carolina	College Park • Charleston, SC	L 3–5	Gay	Mills	None	17–16	8–5
Apr 14	Western Carolina	College Park • Charleston, SC	W 4–3	Bengel	Hare	Collins	18–16	9–5
Apr 16	at Baptist*	CSU Ballpark • North Charleston, SC	L 4–19	Hummel	Montei	Ruth	18–17	
Apr 17	at South Carolina*	Sarge Frye Field • Columbia, SC	L 3–5	Price	Prosser	Jenkins	18–18	
Apr 18	Augusta State*	College Park • Charleston, SC	L 2–4	Glass	Jones	None	18–19	
Apr 20	Furman	College Park • Charleston, SC	W 2–0	Mills	Hlay	None	19–19	10–5
Apr 20	Furman	College Park • Charleston, SC	W 8–1	Bengel	Duke	None	20–19	11–5
Apr 21	Furman	College Park • Charleston, SC	W 9–2	Montei	Lambdin	Collins	21–19	12–5
Apr 23	South Carolina*	College Park • Charleston, SC	W 4–3^{12}	Collins	Coker	None	22–19	
Apr 25	Baptist*	College Park • Charleston, SC	W 8–3	Prosser	Hummel	None	23–19	
Apr 26	at Benedict*	Columbia, SC	W 9–0	Forfeit			24–19	

Post-Season

SoCon Tournament
Date	Opponent	Seed	Site/Stadium	Score	Win	Loss	Overall Record	SoConT Record	
Apr 27	(1N) Appalachian State	(2S)	Hennon Stadium • Cullowhee, NC	L 1–4	Hardee	Mills	Simmons	24–20	0–1
Apr 28	(2N) VMI	(2S)	Hennon Stadium • Cullowhee, NC	W 12–7	Collins	Wharton	None	25–20	1–1
Apr 29	(1S) Western Carolina	(2S)	Hennon Stadium • Cullowhee, NC	W 8–0	Jones	Shamp	None	26–20	2–1
Apr 29	(1N) Appalachian State	(2S)	Hennon Stadium • Cullowhee, NC	L 1–6	Alexander	Prosser	None	26–21	2–2

== 1985 ==
1985 The Citadel Bulldogs baseball
- Conference: Southern Conference
- Record: 29–20 (8–10 SoCon)
- Head coach: Chal Port (21st season)
- Home stadium: College Park

1985 Southern Conference baseball standings
	Conf.				Overall
Team	W		L	PCT	W		L	PCT
Northern
Appalachian State ^{x}‍‍‍	14	–	3	.824	35	–	13	.729
Marshall ‍‍‍	10	–	8	.556	26	–	18	.591
VMI ‍‍‍	8	–	10	.444	16	–	24	.400
East Tennessee State ‍‍‍	3	–	14	.176	10	–	31	.244
Southern
Davidson ^{x}‍‍‍	11	–	5	.688	24	–	19	.558
No. 26 Western Carolina ‍‍‡‍^{y}	11	–	6	.647	37	–	35	.514
The Citadel ‍‍‍	8	–	10	.444	29	–	20	.592
Furman ‍‍‍	4	–	13	.235	16	–	29	.356
x – Division champion ‡ – SoCon Tournament champion y – Invited to the NCAA tournament As of June 30, 1985; Rankings from Collegiate Baseball

=== Roster ===
1985 The Citadel Bulldogs roster
Pitchers: - Russell Arnold; - Matt Barkley - Freshman; - Chris Bengel - Sophomore; - Rich Collins - Senior; - Brian Cowsert - Freshman; - Bunky Hines; - Clifton Jones; - Mike Montei - Sophomore; - David Prosser - Senior; - Brett Sanders - Junior; - Ricky Tillman	Catchers: - Randy Sullivan; Infielders: - Rick Hardwick - Junior; - Tim Jones - Senior; - John Stephens - Freshman; Outfielders: - Lee Glaze - Junior	Unknown: - Andy Beecher; - Johnny Gamble; - Ricky Green - Sophomore; - Bucky Hines; - Jack Korpar - Senior; - Doug McNairy - Senior; - Jimmy Nicholson - Senior; - Steve Sobczak - Sophomore; - Chris Stadler; - Kevin Sturgeon; - Joel Thompson - Sophomore; - Ken Vickery - Junior

=== Coaches ===
1985 The Citadel Bulldogs baseball coaching staff
- Chal Port - Head coach - 21st year

=== Schedule ===
1985 The Citadel Bulldogs baseball game log
Regular season

February
Date	Opponent	Site/Stadium	Score	Win	Loss	Save	Overall Record	SoCon Record
Feb 16	Clemson*	College Park • Charleston, SC	W 10–9^{10}	Collins	Santicasci	None	1–0	
Feb 17	Clemson*	College Park • Charleston, SC	L 5–12	Pawlowski	Sanders	None	1–1	
Feb 23	North Carolina*	College Park • Charleston, SC	L 1–10	McGuire	Bengel	None	1–2	
Feb 24	North Carolina*	College Park • Charleston, SC	W 5–3	Montei	Powell	None	2–2	
Feb 27	Ball State*	College Park • Charleston, SC	W 6–5	Montei	Schrock	None	3–2	

March
Date	Opponent	Site/Stadium	Score	Win	Loss	Save	Overall Record	SoCon Record
Mar 2	Elizabethtown*	College Park • Charleston, SC	W 8–1	Sanders	Deardorff	None	4–2	
Mar 4	Gardner-Webb*	College Park • Charleston, SC	W 3–1	Montei	Shives	None	5–2	
Mar 4	Gardner-Webb*	College Park • Charleston, SC	W 5–2	Andre	Ivery	Collins	6–2	
Mar 6	NC State*	College Park • Charleston, SC	W 9–5	Bengel	Schopp	None	7–2	
Mar 7	North Carolina Wesleyan*	College Park • Charleston, SC	W 10–8	Montei	Siciliano	None	8–2	
Mar 8	North Carolina Wesleyan*	College Park • Charleston, SC	L 8–10^{10}	Coker	Presser	None	8–3	
Mar 9	Fairmont State*	College Park • Charleston, SC	W 16–1	Arnold	Whited	None	9–3	
Mar 10	Fairmont State*	College Park • Charleston, SC	W 6–2	Montei	McQuain	None	10–3	
Mar 11	Wingate*	College Park • Charleston, SC	L 5–7	Rhoney	Collins	None	10–4	
Mar 12	Wingate*	College Park • Charleston, SC	W 8–5	Arnold	Quesinberry	Montei	11–4	
Mar 14	West Liberty*	College Park • Charleston, SC	W 6–4	Prosser	Simpson	Collins	12–4	
Mar 16	at Davidson	Wildcat Field • Davidson, NC	W 4–1	Bengel	Fitzgerald	Collins	13–4	1–0
Mar 16	at Davidson	Wildcat Field • Davidson, NC	W 11–9	Collins	Condon	None	14–4	2–0
Mar 17	at Davidson	Wildcat Field • Davidson, NC	L 1–16	Weaver	Jones	None	14–5	2–1
Mar 18	Allegheny*	College Park • Charleston, SC	W 20–3	Sanders	Zebulske	None	15–5	
Mar 19	Allegheny*	College Park • Charleston, SC	W 10–5	Montei	Dowd	None	16–5	
Mar 20	West Virginia State*	College Park • Charleston, SC	W 9–3	Jones	Hurst	None	17–5	
Mar 23	Western Carolina	College Park • Charleston, SC	L 3–7	Gay	Bengel	None	17–6	2–2
Mar 23	Western Carolina	College Park • Charleston, SC	W 8–1	Montei	Shamp	None	18–6	3–2
Mar 24	Western Carolina	College Park • Charleston, SC	L 8–9	Milewski	Prosser	None	18–7	3–3
Mar 26	Howard*	College Park • Charleston, SC	W 9–4	Prosser	White	Collins	19–7	
Mar 27	Salisbury State*	College Park • Charleston, SC	W 6–0	Arnold	Shreeves	Montei	20–7	
Mar 30	Furman	College Park • Charleston, SC	W 9–4	Bengel	Gargano	None	21–7	4–3
Mar 30	Furman	College Park • Charleston, SC	L 2–4	Burnett	Montei	None	21–8	4–4
Mar 31	Furman	College Park • Charleston, SC	L 3–8	Doubleday	Prosser	None	21–9	4–5

April
Date	Opponent	Site/Stadium	Score	Win	Loss	Save	Overall Record	SoCon Record
Apr 2	at Coastal Carolina*	Charles Watson Stadium • Conway, SC	L 3–8	Heck	Arnold	None	21–10	
Apr 3	Augusta State*	College Park • Charleston, SC	W 8–1	Jones	Pennington	None	22–10	
Apr 5	Davidson	College Park • Charleston, SC	W 6–5	Collins	Weaver	None	23–10	5–5
Apr 5	Davidson	College Park • Charleston, SC	L 4–12	Fitzgerald	Montei	None	23–11	5–6
Apr 6	Davidson	College Park • Charleston, SC	L 8–9	Winborne	Collins	None	23–12	5–7
Apr 8	South Carolina*	College Park • Charleston, SC	W 12–8	Jones	Price	None	24–12	
Apr 10	at Baptist*	CSU Ballpark • North Charleston, SC	W 7–4	Montei	Gainey	None	25–12	
Apr 11	at South Carolina*	Sarge Frye Field • Columbia, SC	L 2–10	Cook	Prosser	None	25–13	
Apr 13	at Western Carolina	Hennon Stadium • Cullowhee, NC	L 3–5	Not Available			25–14	5–8
Apr 13	at Western Carolina	Hennon Stadium • Cullowhee, NC	L 8–9^{11}	Not Available			25–15	5–9
Apr 14	at Western Carolina	Hennon Stadium • Cullowhee, NC	L 3–10	Not Available			25–16	5–10
Apr 16	Armstrong State*	College Park • Charleston, SC	L 2–4	Zakrasjek	Collins	None	25–17	
Apr 17	at Augusta*	Augusta, GA	L 8–15	Not Available	Arnold	None	25–18	
Apr 19	at Furman	Furman Baseball Stadium • Greenville, SC	W 7–1	Montei	Doubleday	None	26–18	6–10
Apr 19	at Furman	Furman Baseball Stadium • Greenville, SC	W 10–4	Jones	Burnett	None	27–18	7–10
Apr 20	at Furman	Furman Baseball Stadium • Greenville, SC	W 15–6	Collins	Duke	None	28–18	8–10
Apr 22	Baptist*	College Park • Charleston, SC	L 1–4	Johnson	Bengel	Gainey	28–19	
Apr 23	at Armstrong State*	Pirate Field • Savannah, GA	L 4–5	Zakrasjek	Jones	None	28–20	
Apr 24	Coastal Carolina*	College Park • Charleston, SC	W 12–11^{10}	Arnold	Smith	None	29–20	

== 1986 ==
1986 The Citadel Bulldogs baseball
- Conference: Southern Conference
- Record: 29–20 (9–9 SoCon)
- Head coach: Chal Port (22nd season)
- Home stadium: College Park

1986 Southern Conference baseball standings
	Conf.				Overall
Team	W		L	PCT	W		L	PCT
Northern
Appalachian State ^{x}‍‍‍^{y}	15	–	2	.882	40	–	13	.755
East Tennessee State ‍‍‍	9	–	9	.500	21	–	21	.500
VMI ‍‍‍	7	–	11	.389	15	–	25	.375
Marshall ‍‍‍	4	–	13	.235	15	–	18	.455
Southern
Western Carolina ^{x}‍‍‡‍^{y}	12	–	5	.706	33	–	28	.541
Davidson ‍‍‍	10	–	8	.556	21	–	20	.512
The Citadel ‍‍‍	9	–	9	.500	29	–	20	.592
Furman ‍‍‍	4	–	13	.235	15	–	24	.385
x – Division champion ‡ – SoCon Tournament champion y – Invited to the NCAA tournament As of June 30, 1986; Rankings from Collegiate Baseball

=== Roster ===
1986 The Citadel Bulldogs roster
Pitchers: - Russell Arnold; - Matt Barkley - Sophomore; - Chris Bengel - Junior; - Tripp Blanton - Freshman; - Brian Cowsert - Sophomore; - Jamie Furr - Freshman; - Matt Gore - Freshman; - Mike Montei - Junior; - Brett Sanders - Senior; - Steve Webb	Catchers: - Randy Sullivan; - Kevin Vickery - Freshman; Infielders: - Rick Hardwick - Senior; - John Stephens - Sophomore; - Billy Swails - Freshman; Outfielders: - Lee Glaze - Senior	Unknown: - Reed Bebee; - Andy Beecher; - Johnny Gamble; - Ricky Green - Junior; - Mike Porpiglia; - Dave Redick; - Danny Richardson - Freshman; - Steve Sobczak - Junior; - Kevin Sturgeon; - Joel Thompson - Junior; - Ken Vickery - Senior; - Buddy Ward - Freshman

=== Coaches ===
1986 The Citadel Bulldogs baseball coaching staff
- Chal Port - Head coach - 22nd year

=== Schedule ===
1986 The Citadel Bulldogs baseball game log
Regular season

February/March
Date	Opponent	Site/Stadium	Score	Win	Loss	Save	Overall Record	SoCon Record
Feb 22	North Carolina*	College Park • Charleston, SC	L 4–8	Turner	Bengel	None	0–1	
Feb 23	North Carolina*	College Park • Charleston, SC	W 8–7	Montei	Kirk	None	1–1	
Mar 1	Elizabethtown*	College Park • Charleston, SC	W 21–4	Arnold	Paisley	None	2–1	
Mar 2	NC State*	College Park • Charleston, SC	W 1–0^{13}	Montei	Hall	None	3–1	
Mar 3	at Clemson*	Beautiful Tiger Field • Clemson, SC	L 5–13	Welch	Bengel	None	3–2	
Mar 4	at Clemson*	Beautiful Tiger Field • Clemson, SC	L 5–16	Lowery	Sanders	None	3–3	
Mar 6	Juniata*	College Park • Charleston, SC	W 20–2	Furr	Kelley	None	4–3	
Mar 7	Juniata*	College Park • Charleston, SC	W 14–3	Gore	Fornadel	None	5–3	
Mar 8	Norfolk State*	College Park • Charleston, SC	W 23–18	Blanton	Sartain	None	6–3	
Mar 9	Norfolk State*	College Park • Charleston, SC	W 11–7	Arnold	Terry	None	7–3	
Mar 10	Wingate*	College Park • Charleston, SC	W 4–0	Blanton	Rhoney	None	8–3	
Mar 11	Wingate*	College Park • Charleston, SC	W 9–0	Montei	Brewer	Furr	9–3	
Mar 12	Fairmont State*	College Park • Charleston, SC	W 8–7	Bengel	Lanham	Furr	10–3	
Mar 13	Fairmont State*	College Park • Charleston, SC	W 7–0	Webb	Gough	None	11–3	
Mar 15	Davidson	College Park • Charleston, SC	L 3–11	Condon	Gore	None	11–4	0–1
Mar 15	Davidson	College Park • Charleston, SC	W 1–0	Montei	Waitsman	None	12–4	1–1
Mar 16	Davidson	College Park • Charleston, SC	W 15–8	Furr	Knox	Webb	13–4	2–1
Mar 17	Howard*	College Park • Charleston, SC	L 6–8	White	Bengel	None	13–5	
Mar 19	North Adams State*	College Park • Charleston, SC	W 12–4	Webb	Fitzpatrick	None	14–5	
Mar 22	at Western Carolina	Hennon Stadium • Cullowhee, NC	L 5–10	Smith	Blanton	None	14–6	2–2
Mar 22	at Western Carolina	Hennon Stadium • Cullowhee, NC	W 7–6	Montei	Sherrill	None	15–6	3–2
Mar 23	at Western Carolina	Hennon Stadium • Cullowhee, NC	L 5–15	Rickman	Webb	Shamp	15–7	3–3
Mar 24	West Virginia State*	College Park • Charleston, SC	L 7–11	Hurst	Arnold	Norman	15–8	
Mar 25	West Virginia State*	College Park • Charleston, SC	W 5–2	Bengel	Moles	Cowsert	16–8	
Mar 26	Salisbury State*	College Park • Charleston, SC	W 9–6	Blanton	Shreeves	None	17–8	
Mar 28	at Furman	Furman Baseball Stadium • Greenville, SC	W 4–3	Webb	Burnett	Furr	18–8	4–3
Mar 28	at Furman	Furman Baseball Stadium • Greenville, SC	W 7–5	Montei	Doubleday	None	19–8	5–3
Mar 29	at Furman	Furman Baseball Stadium • Greenville, SC	L 4–5	Rodgers	Arnold	None	19–9	5–4

April
Date	Opponent	Site/Stadium	Score	Win	Loss	Save	Overall Record	SoCon Record
Apr 1	at Coastal Carolina*	Charles Watson Stadium • Conway, SC	L 5–9	Thomas	Bengel	Logue	19–10	
Apr 3	Augusta State*	College Park • Charleston, SC	W 16–5	Blanton	Long	None	20–10	
Apr 5	at Davidson	Wildcat Field • Davidson, NC	L 4–7	Condon	Cowsert	None	20–11	5–5
Apr 5	at Davidson	Wildcat Field • Davidson, NC	L 2–3	Fitzgerald	Montei	None	20–12	5–6
Apr 6	at Davidson	Wildcat Field • Davidson, NC	W 12–24	Blanton	Waitsman	None	21–12	6–6
Apr 7	Baptist*	College Park • Charleston, SC	L 1–12	Capozzi	Bengel	None	21–13	
Apr 12	Western Carolina	College Park • Charleston, SC	L 6–8	Tebo	Webb	Rickman	21–14	6–7
Apr 12	Western Carolina	College Park • Charleston, SC	L 0–5	Smith	Montei	None	21–15	6–8
Apr 13	Western Carolina	College Park • Charleston, SC	L 4–12	Rickman	Gore	None	21–16	6–9
Apr 16	at Armstrong State*	Pirate Field • Savannah, GA	W 20–8	Arnold	Michener	None	22–16	
Apr 17	South Carolina*	College Park • Charleston, SC	L 10–25	Whatley	Blanton	None	22–17	
Apr 19	Furman	College Park • Charleston, SC	W 6–1	Webb	Doubleday	None	23–17	7–9
Apr 19	Furman	College Park • Charleston, SC	W 11–1	Montei	Spencer	None	24–17	8–9
Apr 20	Furman	College Park • Charleston, SC	W 5–2	Blanton	Burdin	None	25–17	9–9
Apr 21	Coastal Carolina*	College Park • Charleston, SC	W 7–4	Gore	Hargett	None	26–17	
Apr 22	at South Carolina*	Sarge Frye Field • Columbia, SC	W 5–4	Arnold	Boley	Montei	27–17	
Apr 23	at Augusta State*	Augusta, GA	L 2–9	Mayberry	Webb	27–18		
Apr 30	at Baptist*	CSU Ballpark • North Charleston, SC	W 6–2	Montei	Hummel	None	28–18	

May
Date	Opponent	Site/Stadium	Score	Win	Loss	Save	Overall Record	SoCon Record
May 4	FIU*	College Park • Charleston, SC	W 11–6	Cowsert	Hall	None	29–18	
May 5	FIU*	College Park • Charleston, SC	L 2–9	Cook	Webb	None	29–19	
May 6	FIU*	College Park • Charleston, SC	L 5–19	Wiseman	Montei	None	30–19	

== 1987 ==
1987 The Citadel Bulldogs baseball
- Conference: Southern Conference
- Record: 19–31 (6–12 SoCon)
- Head coach: Chal Port (23rd season)
- Home stadium: College Park

1987 Southern Conference baseball standings
	Conf.				Overall
Team	W		L	PCT	W		L	PCT
Northern
Appalachian State ^{x}‍‍‍	10	–	2	.833	26	–	13	.667
VMI ‍‍‍	8	–	4	.667	16	–	16	.500
Marshall ‍‍‍	5	–	7	.417	16	–	17	.485
East Tennessee State ‍‍‍	1	–	11	.083	9	–	19	.321
Southern
No. 30 Western Carolina ^{x}‍‍‡‍^{y}	13	–	3	.813	36	–	20	.643
Davidson ‍‍‍	10	–	7	.588	25	–	17	.595
The Citadel ‍‍‍	6	–	12	.333	19	–	31	.380
Furman ‍‍‍	5	–	12	.294	11	–	26	.297
x – Division champion ‡ – SoCon Tournament champion y – Invited to the NCAA tournament As of June 30, 1987; Rankings from Collegiate Baseball

=== Roster ===
1987 The Citadel Bulldogs roster
Pitchers: 23 - Billy Baker - Freshman; - Russell Arnold; - Matt Barkley - Junior; - Chris Bengel - Senior; - Tripp Blanton - Sophomore; - Brian Cowsert - Junior; - Jamie Furr - Sophomore; - Matt Gore - Sophomore; - Mike Montei - Senior; - Johnny Wase	Catchers: - Kevin Vickery - Sophomore; Infielders: 11 - Chris Coker - Freshman; - John Stephens - Junior; - Billy Swails - Sophomore; Outfielders: 7 - Mike Branham - Freshman; 10 - Anthony Jenkins - Freshman	Unknown: - Andy Beecher; - Gavin Carr; - Johnny Gamble; - Ricky Green - Senior; - Donald Livingston; - George Pearre; - Danny Richardson - Sophomore; - Arnold Singleton; - Barkley Sipple; - Steve Sobczak - Senior; - Jim Steffey; - Joel Thompson - Senior; - Ricky Tillman; - Buddy Ward - Sophomore

=== Coaches ===
1987 The Citadel Bulldogs baseball coaching staff
- Chal Port - Head coach - 23rd year

=== Schedule ===
1987 The Citadel Bulldogs baseball game log
Regular season

February
Date	Opponent	Site/Stadium	Score	Win	Loss	Save	Overall Record	SoCon Record
Feb 14	North Carolina*	College Park • Charleston, SC	L 2–6^{10}	Comacchio	Blanton	None	0–1	
Feb 15	North Carolina*	College Park • Charleston, SC	W 5–3	Montei	Daugherty	None	1–1	
Feb 23	Clemson*	College Park • Charleston, SC	L 3–9	Steele	Gore	None	1–2	
Feb 23	Clemson*	College Park • Charleston, SC	L 0–12	Whitaker	Montei	None	1–3	

March
Date	Opponent	Site/Stadium	Score	Win	Loss	Save	Overall Record	SoCon Record
Mar 2	Gannon*	College Park • Charleston, SC	W 10–6	Baker	Santiago	None	2–3	
Mar 3	Gannon*	College Park • Charleston, SC	W 6–4	Furr	Dalton	Blanton	3–3	
Mar 4	NC State*	College Park • Charleston, SC	L 4–5^{11}	Price	Montei	None	3–4	
Mar 6	Elizabethtown*	College Park • Charleston, SC	W 3–0	Bengel	Bitting	Blanton	4–4	
Mar 7	Norfolk State*	College Park • Charleston, SC	W 7–6	Cowsert	Henderson	None	5–4	
Mar 8	Norfolk State*	College Park • Charleston, SC	L 1–2	Harrell	Baker	Snively	5–5	
Mar 9	Wingate*	College Park • Charleston, SC	W 10–4	Montei	Beatty	None	6–5	
Mar 11	at USC Upstate*	Spartanburg, SC	L 4–18	Hunter	Cowsert	None	6–6	
Mar 12	at USC Upstate*	Spartanburg, SC	L 2–3	Hawkins	Arnold	McKinney	6–7	
Mar 14	at Davidson	Wildcat Field • Davidson, NC	L 4–5	Condon	Gore	Turgeon	6–8	0–1
Mar 14	at Davidson	Wildcat Field • Davidson, NC	L 6–7		Blanton	None	6–9	0–2
Mar 15	at Davidson	Wildcat Field • Davidson, NC	L 2–6	Waitsman	Baker	None	6–10	0–3
Mar 16	North Carolina Wesleyan*	College Park • Charleston, SC	L 6–7	Moore	Furr	Appleton	6–11	
Mar 17	North Carolina Wesleyan*	College Park • Charleston, SC	L 6–8	Siletti	Cowsert	Appleton	6–12	
Mar 21	Western Carolina	College Park • Charleston, SC	L 2–11	Slaughter	Gore	None	6–13	0–4
Mar 21	Western Carolina	College Park • Charleston, SC	L 1–3^{10}	Withrow	Montei	None	6–14	0–5
Mar 22	Western Carolina	College Park • Charleston, SC	L 4–18	Stright	Baker	None	6–15	0–6
Mar 23	West Virginia State*	College Park • Charleston, SC	W 8–2				7–15	
Mar 24	Youngstown State*	College Park • Charleston, SC	W 7–3	Gore	Gump	Montei	8–15	
Mar 26	Northwestern*	College Park • Charleston, SC	L 7–11	Molak	Bengel	None	8–16	
Mar 28	Furman	College Park • Charleston, SC	W 9–5	Montei	Burdin	None	9–16	1–6
Mar 28	Furman	College Park • Charleston, SC	W 7–2	Baker	Burnett	None	10–16	2–6
Mar 29	Furman	College Park • Charleston, SC	W 5–2	Gore	Piekutowski	Montei	11–16	3–6
Mar 31	Salisbury State*	College Park • Charleston, SC	W 19–11	Bengel	Shreeves	None	12–16	

April
Date	Opponent	Site/Stadium	Score	Win	Loss	Save	Overall Record	SoCon Record
Apr 1	South Carolina*	College Park • Charleston, SC	L 3–8	Richey	Furr	None	12–17	
Apr 2	at Baptist*	CSU Ballpark • North Charleston, SC	L 6–8	Capozzi	Tillman	Shoemaker	12–18	
Apr 4	Davidson	College Park • Charleston, SC	L 0–5	Condon	Gore	None	12–19	3–7
Apr 4	Davidson	College Park • Charleston, SC	W 11–10	'Furr	Turgeon	None	13–19	4–7
Apr 5	Davidson	College Park • Charleston, SC	L 1–8	Fitzgerald	Baker	None	13–20	4–8
Apr 8	at Armstrong State*	Pirate Field • Savannah, GA	L 3–4	Hixon	Gore	Christopher	13–21	
Apr 11	at Western Carolina	Hennon Stadium • Cullowhee, NC	L 6–7	Withrow	Furr	None	13–22	4–9
Apr 11	at Western Carolina	Hennon Stadium • Cullowhee, NC	L 4–5	Sinicki	Montei	Withrow	13–23	4–10
Apr 12	at Western Carolina	Hennon Stadium • Cullowhee, NC	L 5–14	Slaughter	Gore	None	13–24	4–11
Apr 13	at Augusta State*	Augusta, GA	L 9–11	Thomason	Tillman	Chester	13–25	
Apr 14	Baptist*	College Park • Charleston, SC	L 3–4^{11}	Shoemaker	Montei	None	13–26	
Apr 17	at Furman	Furman Baseball Stadium • Greenville, SC	L 1–11	Ballard	Gore	None	13–27	4–12
Apr 17	at Furman	Furman Baseball Stadium • Greenville, SC	W 3–1	Montei	Burnett	None	14–27	5–12
Apr 18	at Furman	Furman Baseball Stadium • Greenville, SC	W 8–5	Furr	Wall	None	15–27	6–12
Apr 20	at Coastal Carolina*	Charles Watson Stadium • Conway, SC	L 2–15	Jolly	Tillman	None	15–28	
Apr 21	at Armstrong State*	Pirate Field • Savannah, GA	W 6–3	Montei	Floyd	None	16–28	
Apr 27	at South Carolina*	Sarge Frye Field • Columbia, SC	L 5–8	Richey	Gore	Whatley	16–29	
Apr 28	Coastal Carolina*	College Park • Charleston, SC	W 4–2	Montei	Stokes	None	17–29	
Apr 29	Augusta State*	College Park • Charleston, SC	W 10–9	Furr	McGibbons	None	18–29	

May
Date	Opponent	Site/Stadium	Score	Win	Loss	Save	Overall Record	SoCon Record
May 1	UCF*	College Park • Charleston, SC	L 3–7	Holland	Furr	None	18–30	
May 2	UCF*	College Park • Charleston, SC	W 6–3	Montei	Scott	None	19–30	
May 2	UCF*	College Park • Charleston, SC	L 5–6	Polak	Tillman	None	19–31	

== 1988 ==
1988 The Citadel Bulldogs baseball
- Conference: Southern Conference
- Record: 33–20 (12–6 SoCon)
- Head coach: Chal Port (24th season)
- Home stadium: College Park

1988 Southern Conference baseball standings
	Conf.				Overall
Team	W		L	PCT	W		L	PCT
Northern
VMI ^{x}‍‍‍	11	–	7	.611	20	–	20	.500
Appalachian State ‍‍‍	9	–	7	.563	29	–	17	.630
Marshall ‍‍‍	7	–	9	.438	23	–	17	.575
East Tennessee State ‍‍‍	7	–	11	.389	16	–	35	.314
Southern
Western Carolina ^{x}‍‍‡‍^{y}	14	–	3	.824	38	–	24	.613
The Citadel ‍‍‍	12	–	6	.667	33	–	20	.623
Davidson ‍‍‍	7	–	11	.389	28	–	26	.519
Furman ‍‍‍	2	–	15	.118	8	–	29	.216
x – Division champion ‡ – SoCon Tournament champion y – Invited to the NCAA tournament As of June 30, 1988; Rankings from Collegiate Baseball

=== Roster ===
1988 The Citadel Bulldogs roster
Pitchers: 14 - Richard Shirer; 22 - Brad Stowell - Freshman; 23 - Billy Baker - Sophomore; - Matt Barkley - Senior; - Tripp Blanton - Junior; - Brian Cowsert - Senior; - Jamie Furr - Junior; - Matt Gore - Junior; - Channing Proctor; - Steve Webb	Catchers: - Kevin Vickery - Junior; Infielders: 1 - Phillip Tobin - Freshman; 11 - Chris Coker - Sophomore; - John Stephens - Senior; - Billy Swails - Junior; Outfielders: 4 - Jason Rychlick - Freshman; 7 - Mike Branham - Sophomore; 10 - Anthony Jenkins - Sophomore; 13 - Mike Black; 20 - Bart Mays	Unknown: - Brandon Coker; - Jeff Kornegay; - Donald Livingston; - George Pearre; - Danny Richardson - Junior; - Buddy Ward - Junior

=== Coaches ===
1988 The Citadel Bulldogs baseball coaching staff
- Chal Port - Head coach - 24th year

=== Schedule ===
1988 The Citadel Bulldogs baseball game log
Regular season

February
Date	Opponent	Site/Stadium	Score	Win	Loss	Save	Overall Record	SoCon Record
Feb 17	at Coastal Carolina*	Charles Watson Stadium • Conway, SC	L 2–8	Stokes	Baker	None	0–1	
Feb 21	North Carolina*	College Park • Charleston, SC	L 2–15	Hoog	Gore	None	0–2	
Feb 22	North Carolina*	College Park • Charleston, SC	L 1–2	Gresham	Blanton	None	0–3	
Feb 27	Duke*	College Park • Charleston, SC	W 10–3	Baker	McNamara	None	1–3	
Feb 28	Duke*	College Park • Charleston, SC	L 3–7	Trombley	Shirer	None	1–4	

March
Date	Opponent	Site/Stadium	Score	Win	Loss	Save	Overall Record	SoCon Record
Mar 1	at Baptist*	CSU Ballpark • North Charleston, SC	W 4–2	Furr	Shoemaker	Blanton	2–4	
Mar 5	Norfolk State*	College Park • Charleston, SC	W 14–5	Baker	Harrell	None	3–4	
Mar 6	Norfolk State*	College Park • Charleston, SC	W 19–2	Gore	Johnson	None	4–4	
Mar 7	NC State*	College Park • Charleston, SC	L 3–15	Rhoades	Furr	None	4–5	
Mar 10	Wagner*	College Park • Charleston, SC	W 8–7	Blanton	Kohn	None	5–5	
Mar 11	Wagner*	College Park • Charleston, SC	W 8–0	Gore	Mineo	None	6–5	
Mar 11	Wagner*	College Park • Charleston, SC	W 6–3	Webb	Jewett	Stowell	7–5	
Mar 12	Clarion*	College Park • Charleston, SC	W 10–5	Furr	Marasco	None	8–5	
Mar 12	Clarion*	College Park • Charleston, SC	W 4–3	Blanton	Vanderburg	None	9–5	
Mar 13	Clarion*	College Park • Charleston, SC	W 8–6	Stowell	Roberts	None	10–5	
Mar 14	Wingate*	College Park • Charleston, SC	W 12–5	Baker	Marman	Blanton	11–5	
Mar 15	Wingate*	College Park • Charleston, SC	W 19–6	Gore	Jones	Furr	12–5	
Mar 19	Davidson	College Park • Charleston, SC	W 4–3	Blanton	Wanzenberg	None	13–5	1–0
Mar 19	Davidson	College Park • Charleston, SC	W 4–3	Blanton	Loser	None	14–5	2–0
Mar 20	Davidson	College Park • Charleston, SC	L 5–7	Wilcox	Gore	Wanzenberg	14–6	2–1
Mar 21	Howard*	College Park • Charleston, SC	W 17–2	Proctor	Caine	None	15–6	
Mar 22	Hiram*	College Park • Charleston, SC	W 8–2	Shirer	Brent	None	16–6	
Mar 24	Youngstown State*	College Park • Charleston, SC	W 5–0	Webb	Kortyna	None	17–6	
Mar 26	at Western Carolina	Hennon Stadium • Cullowhee, NC	L 2–8	Uzdilla	Baker	None	17–7	2–2
Mar 26	at Western Carolina	Hennon Stadium • Cullowhee, NC	W 9–2	Furr	Sinicki	None	18–7	3–2
Mar 27	at Western Carolina	Hennon Stadium • Cullowhee, NC	L 10–15	Menhart	Gore	Withrow	18–8	3–3
Mar 28	Salisbury State*	College Park • Charleston, SC	L 6–11	McNeal	Furr	None	18–9	
Mar 29	West Virginia State*	College Park • Charleston, SC	W 9–0	Forfeit			19–9	
Mar 30	West Virginia State*	College Park • Charleston, SC	W 11–4	Blanton	Marshall	None	20–9	
Mar 31	at Winthrop*	Rock Hill, SC	L 2–14	Lewis	Shirer	Rhodes	20–10	

April
Date	Opponent	Site/Stadium	Score	Win	Loss	Save	Overall Record	SoCon Record
Apr 1	at Furman	Furman Baseball Stadium • Greenville, SC	W 7–5	Blanton	Burdin	None	21–10	4–3
Apr 1	at Furman	Furman Baseball Stadium • Greenville, SC	W 7–0	Furr	Anderson	None	22–10	5–3
Apr 2	at Furman	Furman Baseball Stadium • Greenville, SC	W 7–4	Gore	Anderson	Blanton	23–10	6–3
Apr 4	at Augusta State*	Augusta, GA	L 4–6	Langeston	Webb	England	23–11	
Apr 5	Coastal Carolina*	College Park • Charleston, SC	L 6–15	Fortner	Blanton	None	23–12	
Apr 9	at Davidson	Wildcat Field • Davidson, NC	L 5–6	Wanzenberg	Blanton	None	23–13	6–4
Apr 9	at Davidson	Wildcat Field • Davidson, NC	W 3–2	Furr	Wilcox	None	24–13	7–4
Apr 10	at Davidson	Wildcat Field • Davidson, NC	W 12–11	Cowsert	Wanzenberg	Stowell	25–13	8–4
Apr 13	Charleston Southern*	College Park • Charleston, SC	W 12–2	Furr	Gigis	None	26–13	
Apr 14	at Armstrong State*	Pirate Field • Savannah, GA	W 6–3	Cowsert	Gearhart	Blanton	27–13	
Apr 16	Western Carolina	College Park • Charleston, SC	L 8–9	Withrow	Blanton	None	27–14	8–5
Apr 16	Western Carolina	College Park • Charleston, SC	W 4–2	Furr	Menhart	None	28–14	9–5
Apr 17	Western Carolina	College Park • Charleston, SC	L 4–5	Sinicki	Gore	WIthrow	28–15	9–6
Apr 19	South Carolina*	College Park • Charleston, SC	L 8–9^{11}	Williams	Stowell	None	28–16	
Apr 23	Furman	College Park • Charleston, SC	W 8–7	Blanton	Moore	None	29–16	10–6
Apr 23	Furman	College Park • Charleston, SC	W 9–6	Blanton	Dickens	None	30–16	11–6
Apr 24	Furman	College Park • Charleston, SC	W 6–5	Baker	Burdin	None	31–16	12–6
Apr 26	at South Carolina*	Sarge Frye Field • Columbia, SC	L 4–15	Roundtree	Webb	None	31–17	
Apr 27	Armstrong State*	College Park • Charleston, SC	L 7–13	Musser	Proctor	None	31–18	

Post-Season

SoCon Tournament
Date	Opponent	Seed	Site/Stadium	Score	Win	Loss	Save	Overall Record	SoConT Record
Apr 29	(1N) VMI	(2S)	Asheville, NC	W 9–8	Stowell	Tilley	Blanton	32–18	1–0
Apr 30	(1S) Western Carolina	(2S)	Asheville, NC	L 4–6	Menhart	Baker	Withrow	32–19	1–1
Apr 30	(2N) Appalachian State	(2S)	Asheville, NC	W 16–9	Gore	Lazarus	Blanton	33–19	2–1
May 1	(1S) Western Carolina	(2S)	Asheville, NC	L 6–22	Sinicki	Furr	Withrow	33–20	2–2

== 1989 ==
1989 The Citadel Bulldogs baseball
- Conference: Southern Conference
- Record: 30–20 (8–9 SoCon)
- Head coach: Chal Port (25th season)
- Home stadium: College Park

1989 Southern Conference baseball standings
	Conf.				Overall
Team	W		L	PCT	W		L	PCT
Western Carolina ‍†‍‡‍^{y}	10	–	5	.667	23	–	31	.426
Marshall ‍‍‍	8	–	5	.615	16	–	14	.533
Appalachian State ‍‍‍	9	–	7	.563	29	–	13	.690
VMI ‍‍‍	8	–	7	.533	16	–	23	.410
The Citadel ‍‍‍	8	–	9	.471	30	–	20	.600
Furman ‍‍‍	5	–	10	.333	13	–	21	.382
East Tennessee State ‍‍‍	5	–	10	.333	10	–	21	.323
† – Conference champion ‡ – SoCon Tournament champion y – Invited to the NCAA tournament As of June 30, 1989; Rankings from Collegiate Baseball

=== Roster ===
1989 The Citadel Bulldogs roster
Pitchers: 9 - Gettys Glaze - Freshman; 14 - Richard Shirer; 15 - Hank Kraft - Freshman; 22 - Brad Stowell - Sophomore; 23 - Billy Baker - Junior; 24 - Ken Britt - Freshman; - Tripp Blanton - Senior; - Jamie Furr - Senior; - Matt Gore - Senior; - Bobby Hartzog; - Channing Proctor	Catchers: - Kevin Vickery - Senior; Infielders: 1 - Phillip Tobin - Sophomore; 3 - Dan McDonnell - Freshman; 6 - Tony Skole - Freshman; 11 - Chris Coker - Junior; 12 - Scott Elvington - Freshman; 20 - Bart Mays; - Chris Lemonis - Freshman; - Billy Swails - Senior; Outfielders: 4 - Jason Rychlick - Sophomore; 7 - Mike Branham - Junior; 10 - Anthony Jenkins - Junior; 13 - Mike Black	Unknown: - Steven Ackles; - Stephen Burgess; - Chris Massa; - Danny Richardson - Senior; - Buddy Ward - Senior

=== Coaches ===
1989 The Citadel Bulldogs baseball coaching staff
- Chal Port - Head coach - 25th year

=== Schedule ===
1989 The Citadel Bulldogs baseball game log
Regular season

February
Date	Opponent	Site/Stadium	Score	Win	Loss	Save	Overall Record	SoCon Record
Feb 10	vs Campbell*	Pirate Field • Savannah, GA (Great Savannah Shootout)	L 6–8	Wilson	Furr	Milton	0–1	
Feb 11	at Armstrong State*	Pirate Field • Savannah, GA (Great Savannah Shootout)	L 2–3	Ewing	Blanton	None	0–2	
Feb 12	vs Mercer*	Pirate Field • Savannah, GA (Great Savannah Shootout)	W 10–4	Stowell	Ropp	None	1–2	
Feb 19	NC State*	College Park • Charleston, SC	L 4–13	Rhodes	Baker	None	1–3	
Feb 19	NC State	College Park • Charleston, SC	W 10–9	Furr	Rapp	Blanton	2–3	
Feb 23	Liberty*	College Park • Charleston, SC	W 5–4	Stowell	Lotspeich	Blanton	3–3	
Feb 25	North Carolina*	College Park • Charleston, SC	L 0–2	Thoden	Shirer	None	3–4	
Feb 25	North Carolina*	College Park • Charleston, SC	W 6–5	Stowell	Hoog	Blanton	4–4	
Feb 26	Presbyterian*	College Park • Charleston, SC	W 21–3	Baker	Canady	None	5–4	

March
Date	Opponent	Site/Stadium	Score	Win	Loss	Save	Overall Record	SoCon Record
Mar 1	at Baptist*	CSU Ballpark • North Charleston, SC	L 3–5	Brownlee	Stowell	None	5–6	
Mar 4	Longwood*	College Park • Charleston, SC	W 16–1	Baker	Gedro	None	6–5	
Mar 5	Longwood*	College Park • Charleston, SC	L 1–4	Carlisle	Shirer	None	6–6	
Mar 5	Longwood*	College Park • Charleston, SC	L 4–5	Hale	Furr	Bryant	6–7	
Mar 6	Wingate*	College Park • Charleston, SC	W 3–1	Gore	Morman	None	7–7	
Mar 7	Wingate*	College Park • Charleston, SC	W 11–4	Britt	Beal	None	8–7	
Mar 11	Marshall	College Park • Charleston, SC	L 7–12^{8}	Petersen	Blanton	None	8–8	0–1
Mar 11	Marshall	College Park • Charleston, SC	W 3–0	Shirer	Throckmorton	None	9–8	1–1
Mar 12	Marshall	College Park • Charleston, SC	W 1–0	Gore	Schafer	None	10–8	2–1
Mar 14	North Adams State*	College Park • Charleston, SC	W 7–0	'Furr	Laundry	None	11–8	
Mar 18	at Western Carolina	Hennon Stadium • Cullowhee, NC	L 10–11	Stevens	Britt	Thomas	11–9	2–2
Mar 19	at Western Carolina	Hennon Stadium • Cullowhee, NC	L 6–10	Hooper	Shirer	None	11–10	2–3
Mar 19	at Western Carolina	Hennon Stadium • Cullowhee, NC	W 5–1	Gore	Menhart	None	12–10	3–3
Mar 20	Hiram*	College Park • Charleston, SC	W 13–1	Britt	Jones	None	13–10	
Mar 21	USC Upstate*	College Park • Charleston, SC	W 10–5	Baker	DeRoos	None	14–10	
Mar 22	Gannon*	College Park • Charleston, SC	W 7–2	Stowell	Lincoln	None	15–10	
Mar 24	Appalachian State	College Park • Charleston, SC	W 6–1	Furr	Palmer	None	16–10	4–3
Mar 24	Appalachian State	College Park • Charleston, SC	W 13–6	Shirer	Riley	None	17–10	5–3
Mar 25	Appalachian State	College Park • Charleston, SC	L 5–8	Meadows	Baker	Norman	17–11	5–4
Mar 27	at Presbyterian*	Presbyterian Baseball Complex • Clinton, SC	W 6–5	Stowell	Canady	Blanton	18–11	
Mar 28	at Central Wesleyan*	Central, SC	W 13–2	Proctor	Epley	Kraft	19–11	
Mar 29	at Limestone*	Gaffney, SC	W 11–4	Baker	Denby	Blanton	20–11	

April
Date	Opponent	Site/Stadium	Score	Win	Loss	Save	Overall Record	SoCon Record
Apr 1	at Furman	Furman Baseball Stadium • Greenville, SC	W 5–3	Furr	Hartley	Blanton	21–11	6–4
Apr 1	at Furman	Furman Baseball Stadium • Greenville, SC	L 1–3	Brodnax	Shirer	None	21–12	6–5
Apr 2	at Furman	Furman Baseball Stadium • Greenville, SC	W 6–0	Gore	Clark	None	22–12	7–5
Apr 3	at South Carolina*	Sarge Frye Field • Columbia, SC	L 7–17	Beatson	Stowell	None	22–13	
Apr 4	at Armstrong State*	Pirate Field • Savannah, GA	W 6–2	Britt	Owens	Glaze	23–13	
Apr 6	Coastal Carolina*	College Park • Charleston, SC	L 2–5	Stone	Shirer	Logue	23–14	
Apr 7	Wofford*	College Park • Charleston, SC	W 13–6	Furr	Yancey	None	24–14	
Apr 7	Wofford*	College Park • Charleston, SC	W 6–5	Gore	Mathis	None	25–14	
Apr 12	at Augusta State*	Augusta, GA	L 6–17	Hunter	Baker	None	25–15	
Apr 13	Armstrong State*	College Park • Charleston, SC	W 4–1	Stowell	Owens	Glaze	26–15	
Apr 16	East Tennessee State	College Park • Charleston, SC	W 5–4	Gore	Campbell	None	27–15	8–5
Apr 16	East Tennessee State	College Park • Charleston, SC	L 2–4^{12}	Clark	Blanton	None	27–16	8–6
Apr 17	at Coastal Carolina*	Charles Watson Stadium • Conway, SC	W 5–3	Baker	Stone	None	28–16	
Apr 19	Baptist*	College Park • Charleston, SC	L 5–15	Inabinet	Stowell	None	28–17	
Apr 22	at VMI	Patchin Field • Lexington, VA	L 2–13	Johnson	Gore	None	28–18	8–7
Apr 22	at VMI	Patchin Field • Lexington, VA	L 4–6	Glover	Furr	Craft	28–19	8–8
Apr 23	at VMI	Patchin Field • Lexington, VA	L 4–5	Armbruster	Glaze	None	28–20	8–9
Apr 24	South Carolina*	College Park • Charleston, SC	W 6–5^{12}	Blanton	Beatson	None	29–20	

Post-Season

SoCon Tournament
Date	Opponent	Seed	Site/Stadium	Score	Win	Loss	Save	Overall Record	SoConT Record
Apr 27	(4) VMI	(5)	Asheville, NC	W 17–11	Stowell	Johnson	None	30–20	1–0
Tournament canceled due to inclement weather.

== MLB Draft picks ==
Year	Player	Round	Team
1982	Jeff Barkley	13	Indians
1982	Mike Knox	7	Braves
1982	Bill White	5	Dodgers
1983	Martin Blair	44	Rangers
1983	Mike Cherry	2	Dodgers
1984	John Murphy	23	Cardinals
1985	Tim Jones	2	Cardinals
1988	John Stephens	28	Cardinals
