= Southern Conference baseball tournament =

- Conference baseball championship
- Southern Conference logo
- Sport: Baseball
- Conference: Southern Conference
- Number of teams: 8
- Format: Single-elimination play-in, then six-team double-elimination tournament
- Current stadium: Fluor Field
- Current location: Greenville, South Carolina
- Played: 1950–1953, 1984–2019, 2021-present
- Last contest: 2026
- Current champion: The Citadel (1)
- Most championships: Western Carolina (10)
- TV partner: ESPN+
- Official website: SoConSports.com Baseball

The Southern Conference baseball tournament is the conference championship tournament in baseball for the Southern Conference. The winner of the tournament receives the conference's automatic bid to the NCAA Division I baseball tournament. The event is scheduled for the Wedneaday through Sunday before Memorial Day each year, five days prior to the NCAA Regionals.

== Tournament ==
The Southern Conference Baseball Tournament is held annually. Since 2022, all eight teams sponsoring baseball in the conference participate in the tournament. The bottom four teams play in a single-elimination play-in round, and the two play-in winners join the rest of the teams in a six-team double-elimination tournament. The previous format in 2021 included the eight teams competing in a two-bracket double-elimination tournament. Prior to 2020, when there were more than eight baseball teams in the conference, there was a single-elimination play-in round followed by an eight-team two-bracket double-elimination tournament. The winner receives an automatic bid to the NCAA Division I baseball tournament while the other teams must rely on an at-large bid.

== History ==
The Southern Conference first held a baseball tournament in 1950. Maryland and Virginia Tech from the North division, and Clemson and Wake Forest from the South played the inaugural year in Greensboro, North Carolina, with Wake Forest defeating Maryland for the title. In 1951, Clemson, Duke, Maryland, and West Virginia met, with Duke defeating Clemson in the final. Duke repeated their title in 1952, over N.C. State, George Washington, and Richmond. Duke, George Washington, Maryland, and North Carolina participated in 1953, with Duke again the winner.

The tournament was renewed in 1984 as a four-team tournament. The tournament was held at Joseph P. Riley Jr. Park in Charleston, South Carolina, from 1997 to 2008, and again in 2010 and 2011. In 2012 and 2013, the tournament was played at Fluor Field at the West End in Greenville, South Carolina, before returning to Charleston in 2014 and 2015. The tournament has been in Greenville every year since 2016, with the exception of the 2020 edition being canceled due to the COVID-19 pandemic.

== Champions ==
=== By year ===
Year	Champion	Runner-up	Venue	MVP
1950	Wake Forest	Maryland	Greensboro, North Carolina	
1951	Duke	Clemson	Greensboro, North Carolina	Bob Davis, Duke
1952	Duke	NC State	Devereux Meadow • Raleigh, North Carolina	Red Smith, Duke
1953	Duke	North Carolina	Devereux Meadow • Raleigh, North Carolina	
No tournament from 1954–1983.
1984	Appalachian State	The Citadel	Hennon Stadium • Cullowhee, North Carolina	Rusty Weaver, Appalachian State
1985	Western Carolina	Marshall	Boone, North Carolina	Mike Carson, Western Carolina
1986	Western Carolina	Appalachian State	Hennon Stadium • Cullowhee, North Carolina	David Hyatt, Western Carolina
1987	Western Carolina	VMI	Asheville, North Carolina	Clint Fairey, Western Carolina
1988	Western Carolina	The Citadel	Asheville, North Carolina	Keith LeClair, Western Carolina
1989	Western Carolina	Marshall	Asheville, North Carolina	Paul Menhart, Western Carolina
1990	The Citadel	Western Carolina	College Park • Charleston, South Carolina	Billy Baker, The Citadel
1991	Furman	Western Carolina	College Park • Charleston, South Carolina	Brent Williams, Furman
1992	Western Carolina	Georgia Southern	College Park • Charleston, South Carolina	Joey Cox, Western Carolina
1993	Western Carolina	VMI	College Park • Charleston, South Carolina	Phillip Grundy, Western Carolina
1994	The Citadel	Western Carolina	College Park • Charleston, South Carolina	Jermaine Shuler, The Citadel
1995	The Citadel	Georgia Southern	College Park • Charleston, South Carolina	Donald Morillo, The Citadel
1996	Georgia Southern	The Citadel	College Park • Charleston, South Carolina	Mark Hamlin, Georgia Southern
1997	Western Carolina	Furman	Riley Park • Charleston, South Carolina	J. P. Burwell, Western Carolina
1998	The Citadel	UNC Greensboro	Riley Park • Charleston, South Carolina	Brian Rogers, The Citadel
1999	The Citadel	Western Carolina	Riley Park • Charleston, South Carolina	Rodney Hancock, The Citadel
2000	Georgia Southern	Furman	Riley Park • Charleston, South Carolina	Matt Easterday, Georgia Southern
2001	The Citadel	UNC Greensboro	Riley Park • Charleston, South Carolina	Randy Corn, The Citadel
2002	Georgia Southern	College of Charleston	Riley Park • Charleston, South Carolina	Brett Lewis, Georgia Southern
2003	Western Carolina	Georgia Southern	Riley Park • Charleston, South Carolina	Brian Sigmon, Western Carolina
2004	The Citadel	Western Carolina	Riley Park • Charleston, South Carolina	Jonathan Ellis, The Citadel
2005	Furman	Georgia Southern	Riley Park • Charleston, South Carolina	Nick Hollstegge, Furman
2006	College of Charleston	The Citadel	Riley Park • Charleston, South Carolina	Nick Chigges & Jess Easterling, College of Charleston
2007	Wofford	The Citadel	Riley Park • Charleston, South Carolina	Brandon Waring, Wofford
2008	Elon	College of Charleston	Riley Park • Charleston, South Carolina	Cory Harrilchak, Elon
2009	Georgia Southern	Elon	Fluor Field • Greenville, South Carolina	Kyle Blackburn, Georgia Southern
2010	The Citadel	Western Carolina	Riley Park • Charleston, South Carolina	Justin Mackert, The Citadel
2011	Georgia Southern	Samford	Riley Park • Charleston, South Carolina	Chris Beck, Georgia Southern
2012	Samford	Georgia Southern	Fluor Field • Greenville, South Carolina	Josh Martin, Samford
2013	Elon	The Citadel	Fluor Field • Greenville, South Carolina	Joe Jackson, The Citadel
2014	Georgia Southern	Samford	Riley Park • Charleston, South Carolina	Jason Richman, Georgia Southern
2015	Mercer	Samford	Riley Park • Charleston, South Carolina	Eric Nyquist, Mercer
2016	Western Carolina	Mercer	Fluor Field • Greenville, South Carolina	Matt Smith, Western Carolina
2017	UNC Greensboro	Furman	Fluor Field • Greenville, South Carolina	Tripp Shelton, UNC Greensboro
2018	Samford	Mercer	Fluor Field • Greenville, South Carolina	Brooks Carlson, Samford
2019	Mercer	Wofford	Fluor Field • Greenville, South Carolina	Trevor Austin, Mercer
2020	Cancelled due to the coronavirus pandemic			
2021	Samford	Western Carolina	Fluor Field • Greenville, South Carolina	Towns King, Samford
2022	UNC Greensboro	Wofford	Fluor Field • Greenville, South Carolina	Kennedy Jones, UNC Greensboro
2023	Samford	Wofford	Fluor Field • Greenville, South Carolina	Heath Clevenger, Samford
2024	Wofford	Samford	Fluor Field • Greenville, South Carolina	Zac Cowan, Wofford
2025	East Tennessee State	Samford	Fluor Field • Greenville, South Carolina	Cooper Torres, East Tennessee State
2026	The Citadel	Samford	Fluor Field • Greenville, South Carolina	Michael Gibson, The Citadel

=== By school ===
Program	Championships	Years
Western Carolina	10	1985, 1986, 1987, 1988, 1989, 1992, 1993, 1997, 2003, 2016
The Citadel	9	1990, 1994, 1995, 1998, 1999, 2001, 2004, 2010, 2026
Georgia Southern	6	1996, 2000, 2002, 2009, 2011, 2014
Samford	4	2012, 2018, 2021, 2023
Duke	3	1951, 1952, 1953
Wofford	2	2007, 2024
UNC Greensboro	2	2017, 2022
Mercer	2	2015, 2019
Elon	2	2008, 2013
Furman	2	1991, 2005
Wake Forest	1	1950
Appalachian State	1	1984
College of Charleston (Note: Now athletically branded as Charleston.)	1	2006
East Tennessee State	1	2025

- Pink indicate the school no longer sponsors baseball or is no longer in the Southern Conference. VMI is the only member of the SoCon to have never won the conference tournament. Tennessee Tech will join the conference in 2026.

Of former members of the SoCon, Clemson, Davidson, George Washington, Marshall, Maryland, North Carolina, NC State, Richmond, Virginia Tech, and West Virginia all participated in the tournament but never won it.

== Composite Records ==
Current schools only, 1984 through 2025

Team	App.	Wins	Losses	Pct.
The Citadel	36	76	49	.608
East Tennessee State	26	27	47	.365
Mercer	9	24	17	.585
UNC Greensboro	22	36	40	.474
Samford	15	38	21	.644
VMI	23	16	40	.286
Western Carolina	40	82	64	.562
Wofford	16	30	27	.526

== See also ==
- List of Southern Conference football champions
- List of Southern Conference men's basketball champions
