= 1984 Southern Conference baseball tournament =

- Teams: 4
- Format: Double-elimination tournament
- Finals site: Hennon Stadium; Cullowhee, North Carolina
- Champions: Appalachian State (1st title)
- MVP: Rusty Weaver (Appalachian State)

1984 Southern Conference baseball standings
	Conf.				Overall
Team	W		L	PCT	W		L	PCT
Northern
Appalachian State ^{x}‍‍‡‍^{y}	12	–	2	.857	35	–	7	.833
VMI ‍‍‍	6	–	7	.462	16	–	18	.471
Marshall ‍‍‍	5	–	8	.385	11	–	16	.407
East Tennessee State ‍‍‍	3	–	9	.250	9	–	19	.321
Southern
Western Carolina ^{x}‍‍‍	13	–	3	.813	37	–	20	.649
The Citadel ‍‍‍	12	–	5	.706	26	–	21	.553
Davidson ‍‍‍	5	–	12	.294	12	–	16	.429
Furman ‍‍‍	4	–	14	.222	16	–	19	.457
x – Division champion ‡ – SoCon Tournament champion y – Invited to the NCAA tournament As of June 30, 1984; Rankings from Collegiate Baseball

The 1984 Southern Conference baseball tournament was held at Hennon Stadium on the campus of Western Carolina University in Cullowhee, North Carolina, from April 27 through 29. This was the league's first championship tournament to be held since 1953, when seven schools departed the conference to form the Atlantic Coast Conference. Modern conference baseball records begin with the 1954 baseball season. The North Division's top seed Appalachian State won the tournament and earned the Southern Conference's automatic bid to the 1984 NCAA Division I baseball tournament.

The tournament used a double-elimination format.

== Seeding ==
The top two teams from each division based on regular season conference winning percentage participated in the tournament. The top seed from the North Division played the second seed from the South in the first round, and vice versa. The winners of the first round then played, while the losers played an elimination game. There were no ties in the standings, so no tiebreakers were necessary.

Team	W	L	Pct	GB	Seed
North Division
Appalachian State	12	2	.857	–	1N
VMI	6	7	.462	5.5	2N
Marshall	5	8	.385	6.5	–
East Tennessee State	3	9	.250	8	–
South Division
Western Carolina	13	3	.813	–	1S
The Citadel	12	5	.706	1.5	2S
Davidson	5	12	.294	8.5	–
Furman	4	14	.222	10	–

== Bracket ==
First round
1N	Appalachian State	4
2S	The Citadel	1
1S	Western Carolina	10
2N	VMI	7
Lower round 1
2S	The Citadel	12
2N	VMI	7

Semi-finals
1N	Appalachian State	9
1S	Western Carolina	5
Lower final
1S	Western Carolina	0
2S	The Citadel	8

Finals
1N	Appalachian State	6	—
2S	The Citadel	1	—

== Most Outstanding Player ==
Tournament Most Outstanding Player
Rusty Weaver
Appalachian State
