= 1987 Southern Conference baseball tournament =

- Teams: 4
- Format: Double-elimination tournament
- Finals site: Asheville, North Carolina
- Champions: Western Carolina (3rd title)
- MVP: Clint Fairey (Western Carolina)

1987 Southern Conference baseball standings
	Conf.				Overall
Team	W		L	PCT	W		L	PCT
Northern
Appalachian State ^{x}‍‍‍	10	–	2	.833	26	–	13	.667
VMI ‍‍‍	8	–	4	.667	16	–	16	.500
Marshall ‍‍‍	5	–	7	.417	16	–	17	.485
East Tennessee State ‍‍‍	1	–	11	.083	9	–	19	.321
Southern
No. 30 Western Carolina ^{x}‍‍‡‍^{y}	13	–	3	.813	36	–	20	.643
Davidson ‍‍‍	10	–	7	.588	25	–	17	.595
The Citadel ‍‍‍	6	–	12	.333	19	–	31	.380
Furman ‍‍‍	5	–	12	.294	11	–	26	.297
x – Division champion ‡ – SoCon Tournament champion y – Invited to the NCAA tournament As of June 30, 1987; Rankings from Collegiate Baseball

The 1987 Southern Conference baseball tournament was held in Asheville, North Carolina, from April 27 through 29. The South Division's top seed Western Carolina won their third consecutive tournament and earned the Southern Conference's automatic bid to the 1987 NCAA Division I baseball tournament.

The tournament used a double-elimination format.

== Seeding ==
The top two teams from each division based on regular season conference winning percentage participated in the tournament. The top seed from the North Division played the second seed from the South in the first round, and vice versa. The winners of the first round then played, while the losers played an elimination game. There were no ties in the standings, so no tiebreakers were necessary.

Team	W	L	Pct	GB	Seed
North Division
Appalachian State	10	2	.833	–	1N
VMI	8	4	.667	2	2N
Marshall	5	7	.417	5	–
East Tennessee State	1	11	.083	9	–
South Division
Western Carolina	13	3		–	1S
Davidson	10	7	.588	3.5	2S
The Citadel	6	12	.333	7.5	–
Furman	5	12	.294	8.5	–

== Bracket ==
First round
1N	Appalachian State	8
2S	Davidson	5
1S	Western Carolina	16
2N	VMI	4
Lower round 1
2S	Davidson	7
2N	VMI	15

Semi-finals
1N	Appalachian State	7
1S	Western Carolina	8
Lower final
1N	Appalachian State	9*
2N	VMI	10*

Finals
1S	Western Carolina	9	–
2N	VMI	4	–

* - Indicates game required extra innings.

== Most Outstanding Player ==
Walt Nadzak Award, Tournament Most Outstanding Player
Clint Fairey
Western Carolina
