= 1989 Southern Conference baseball tournament =

- Teams: 7
- Format: Double-elimination tournament
- Finals site: Asheville, North Carolina
- Champions: Western Carolina (5th title)
- MVP: Paul Menhart (Western Carolina)

1989 Southern Conference baseball standings
	Conf.				Overall
Team	W		L	PCT	W		L	PCT
Western Carolina ‍†‍‡‍^{y}	10	–	5	.667	23	–	31	.426
Marshall ‍‍‍	8	–	5	.615	16	–	14	.533
Appalachian State ‍‍‍	9	–	7	.563	29	–	13	.690
VMI ‍‍‍	8	–	7	.533	16	–	23	.410
The Citadel ‍‍‍	8	–	9	.471	30	–	20	.600
Furman ‍‍‍	5	–	10	.333	13	–	21	.382
East Tennessee State ‍‍‍	5	–	10	.333	10	–	21	.323
† – Conference champion ‡ – SoCon Tournament champion y – Invited to the NCAA tournament As of June 30, 1989; Rankings from Collegiate Baseball

The 1989 Southern Conference baseball tournament was held in Asheville, North Carolina, from April 27 through 29. The South Division's top seed Western Carolina won their fifth consecutive tournament and earned the Southern Conference's automatic bid to the 1989 NCAA Division I baseball tournament. Western Carolina claimed its fifth tournament title of the first six in modern SoCon history.

The tournament used a double-elimination format. Heavy rains forced the cancellation of the tournament after five games. A three team playoff was held in Montreat, North Carolina, between Appalachian State, Marshall, and Western Carolina to determine the automatic qualifier in the NCAA tournament.

== Seeding ==
With Davidson's departure from the conference beginning with the 1989 season, the Southern Conference did away with the divisional structure for a seven-team league. All seven teams were in the tournament for the first time, with seeding based on conference winning percentage. Furman claimed more wins over East Tennessee State in the regular season, and were awarded the sixth seed.

Team	W	L	Pct	GB	Seed
Western Carolina	10	5	.667	–	1
Marshall	8	5	.615	1	2
Appalachian State	9	7	.563	1.5	3
VMI	8	7	.533	2	4
The Citadel	8	9	.471	3	5
Furman	5	10	.333	5	6
East Tennessee	5	10	.333	5	7

== Bracket ==
Upper round 1	Upper round 2	Upper final	Final
1	Western Carolina
4	The Citadel
4	VMI	11
5	The Citadel	17
3	Appalachian State
2	Marshall	12
7	East Tennessee	4
2	Marshall	9
3	Appalachian State	13
3	Appalachian State	8
6	Furman	2
Lower round 1	Lower round 2	Lower round 3	Lower final
7	East Tennessee
4	VMI	5	6	Furman
6	Furman	7
2	Marshall

Three team playoff at Montreat, NC

Semifinal			Final
			1	Western Carolina	4
1	Western Carolina	7	2	Marshall	2
3	Appalachian State	2

== Most Outstanding Player ==
Walt Nadzak Award, Tournament Most Outstanding Player
Paul Menhart
Western Carolina
