= 1988 Southern Conference baseball tournament =

- Teams: 4
- Format: Double-elimination tournament
- Finals site: Asheville, North Carolina
- Champions: Western Carolina (4th title)
- MVP: Keith LeClair (Western Carolina)

1988 Southern Conference baseball standings
	Conf.				Overall
Team	W		L	PCT	W		L	PCT
Northern
VMI ^{x}‍‍‍	11	–	7	.611	20	–	20	.500
Appalachian State ‍‍‍	9	–	7	.563	29	–	17	.630
Marshall ‍‍‍	7	–	9	.438	23	–	17	.575
East Tennessee State ‍‍‍	7	–	11	.389	16	–	35	.314
Southern
Western Carolina ^{x}‍‍‡‍^{y}	14	–	3	.824	38	–	24	.613
The Citadel ‍‍‍	12	–	6	.667	33	–	20	.623
Davidson ‍‍‍	7	–	11	.389	28	–	26	.519
Furman ‍‍‍	2	–	15	.118	8	–	29	.216
x – Division champion ‡ – SoCon Tournament champion y – Invited to the NCAA tournament As of June 30, 1988; Rankings from Collegiate Baseball

The 1988 Southern Conference baseball tournament was held in Asheville, North Carolina, from April 27 through 29. The South Division's top seed Western Carolina won their fourth consecutive tournament and earned the Southern Conference's automatic bid to the 1988 NCAA Division I baseball tournament.

The tournament used a double-elimination format.

== Seeding ==
The top two teams from each division based on regular season conference winning percentage participated in the tournament. The top seed from the North Division played the second seed from the South in the first round, and vice versa. The winners of the first round then played, while the losers played an elimination game. There were no ties in the standings, so no tiebreakers were necessary.

Team	W	L	Pct	GB	Seed
North Division
VMI	11	7	.611	–	1N
Appalachian State	9	7	.563	1	2N
Marshall	7	9	.438	3	–
East Tennessee State	7	11	.389	4	–
South Division
Western Carolina	14	3	.824	–	1S
The Citadel	12	6	.667	2.5	2S
Davidson	7	11	.389	7.5	–
Furman	2	15	.118	12	–

== Bracket ==
First round
1N	VMI	8
2S	The Citadel	9
1S	Western Carolina	18
2N	Appalachian State	8
Lower round 1
1N	VMI	4
2N	Appalachian State	11

Semi-finals
2S	The Citadel	4
1S	Western Carolina	6
Lower final
2S	The Citadel	16
2N	Appalachian State	9

Finals
1S	Western Carolina	22	—
2S	The Citadel	6	—

== Most Outstanding Player ==
Walt Nadzak Award, Tournament Most Outstanding Player
Keith LeClair
Western Carolina
