= 1985 Southern Conference baseball tournament =

- Teams: 4
- Format: Double-elimination tournament
- Finals site: Boone, North Carolina
- Champions: Western Carolina (1st title)
- MVP: Mike Carson (Western Carolina)

1985 Southern Conference baseball standings
	Conf.				Overall
Team	W		L	PCT	W		L	PCT
Northern
Appalachian State ^{x}‍‍‍	14	–	3	.824	35	–	13	.729
Marshall ‍‍‍	10	–	8	.556	26	–	18	.591
VMI ‍‍‍	8	–	10	.444	16	–	24	.400
East Tennessee State ‍‍‍	3	–	14	.176	10	–	31	.244
Southern
Davidson ^{x}‍‍‍	11	–	5	.688	24	–	19	.558
No. 26 Western Carolina ‍‍‡‍^{y}	11	–	6	.647	37	–	35	.514
The Citadel ‍‍‍	8	–	10	.444	29	–	20	.592
Furman ‍‍‍	4	–	13	.235	16	–	29	.356
x – Division champion ‡ – SoCon Tournament champion y – Invited to the NCAA tournament As of June 30, 1985; Rankings from Collegiate Baseball

The 1985 Southern Conference baseball tournament was held in Boone, North Carolina, from April 27 through 29. The South Division's second seed Western Carolina won the tournament and earned the Southern Conference's automatic bid to the 1985 NCAA Division I baseball tournament.

The tournament used a double-elimination format.

== Seeding ==
The top two teams from each division based on regular season conference winning percentage participated in the tournament. The top seed from the North Division played the second seed from the South in the first round, and vice versa. The winners of the first round then played, while the losers played an elimination game. There were no ties in the standings, so no tiebreakers were necessary.

Team	W	L	Pct	GB	Seed
North Division
Appalachian State	14	3	.824	–	1N
Marshall	10	8	.556	4.5	2N
VMI	8	10	.444	6.5	–
East Tennessee State	3	14	.176	11	–
South Division
Davidson	11	5	.688	–	1S
Western Carolina	11	6	.647	.5	2S
The Citadel	8	10	.444	4	–
Furman	4	13	.235	7.5	–

== Bracket ==
First round
1S	Davidson	1
2N	Marshall	9
1N	Appalachian State	2
2S	Western Carolina	3
Lower round 1
1S	Davidson	8
1N	Appalachian State	5

Semi-finals
2N	Marshall	5
2S	Western Carolina	2
Lower final
2S	Western Carolina	13
1S	Davidson	2

Finals
2N	Marshall	6	12
2S	Western Carolina	12	13

== Most Outstanding Player ==
Walt Nadzak Award, Tournament Most Outstanding Player
Mike Carson
Western Carolina
