= Mike Cherry =

Mike Cherry may refer to:

- Mike Cherry (baseball), American baseball player
- Mike Cherry (American football) (born 1973), American football quarterback
- Mike Cherry (Kentucky politician), former American politician
- Mike Cherry (Virginia politician), American politician

== See also ==
- Michael Cherry (disambiguation)
