= West Virginia State Yellow Jackets =

- University: West Virginia State University
- Nickname: Yellow Jackets
- NCAA: Division II
- Conference: Mountain East Conference
- Athletic director: David Hicks
- Location: Institute, West Virginia
- Varsity teams: 17
- Football stadium: Lakin-Ray Field at Dickerson Stadium
- Basketball arena: Walker Convocation Center
- Baseball stadium: Cal Bailey Field
- Softball stadium: Lady Jackets Field
- Soccer stadium: Lakin-Ray Field at Dickerson Stadium
- Tennis venue: Marvin D. Mills Tennis Complex
- Other venues: Fleming Hall
- Colors: Old gold and black
- Mascot: Stinger
- Website: www.wvsuyellowjackets.com
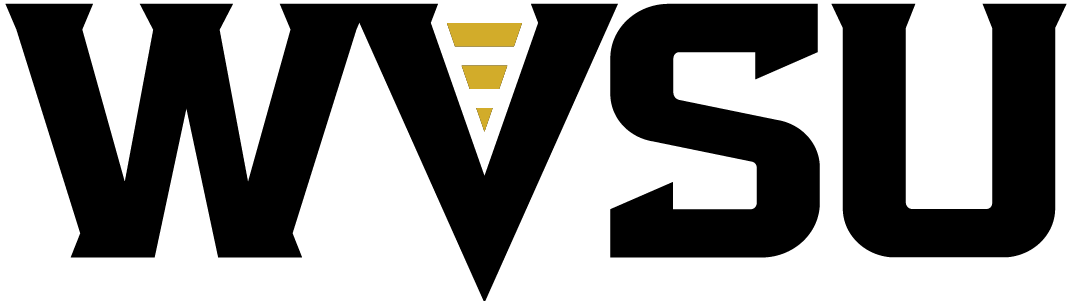

The West Virginia State Yellow Jackets (also WVSU) are the athletic teams that represent West Virginia State University, located in Institute, West Virginia, in NCAA Division II intercollegiate sports. The Yellow Jackets compete as members of the Mountain East Conference for all 15 varsity sports. West Virginia State was a founding member of the conference following the demise of the West Virginia Intercollegiate Athletic Conference in 2013. WVSU's main rivals are the University of Charleston (WV), Kentucky State University, and Central State University.

== History ==
During the segregation era, the school competed in athletics as "West Virginia" and played other segregated schools as a member of the Colored Intercollegiate Athletic Association. After desegregation, the school withdrew from the CIAA (today's Central Intercollegiate Athletic Association) and competed as "West Virginia State" to avoid confusion with West Virginia University. The school then moved to the formerly all-white West Virginia Intercollegiate Athletic Conference, which competed in the National Association of Intercollegiate Athletics, before moving to NCAA's Division II for the 1997-1998 athletic year. After the dissolution of the WVIAC, WVSU joined the new Mountain East Conference in 2013, which is part of Division II.

During the segregation era, black high schools were barred from competition in the West Virginia Secondary School Activities Commission, and State therefore sponsored an unofficial "state colored championship" from 1932 to 1959.

== Varsity teams ==
Sources: (Note: Acrobatics & Tumbling will begin competition in Spring 2024.) (Note: Cross Country, Indoor & Outdoor Track will begin competition in Fall 2023 for both men and women.)

Men's sports	Women's sports
Baseball	Acrobatics
Basketball	Basketball
Cross Country	Cross Country
Football	Soccer
Golf	Softball
Track and field^{1}	Track and field^{1}
Tennis	Tennis
	Volleyball
^{1} – includes both indoor and outdoor

=== Football ===
The football team was ranked in the NCAA's Division II Football Poll in 2008. They played in the Chicago Football Classic, which is for HBCU colleges and universities, at Chicago's Soldier Field in 2008. They defeated the Marauders of Central State University. The Yellow Jackets football team has also played in the Palmetto Capital City Classic against Benedict College and the Dayton Classic against Central State. In December 2012, Jon Anderson was named the 13th head football coach in Yellow Jackets history. Anderson came to WVSU after serving on the coaching staff of NAIA football powerhouse the University of Sioux Falls (USF). During Anderson's time on the coaching staff at USF, the school won three NAIA national championships.

== Facilities ==
Venue	Sport(s)	Open.	Capac.	Ref.
Lakin-Ray Field at Dickerson Stadium	Football	1963	5,000	
Walker Convocation Center	Basketball	2014	1,350	
Calvin L. Bailey Field	Baseball	1978	500	
Lady Jackets Field	Softball	2010	250	
Marvin D. Mills Tennis Complex	Tennis	1970	100	

== Accolades ==
Other accolades of the Yellow Jackets athletic teams include the men's basketball team ranking #24 in the U.S. on the NCAA's Division II preseason top 25 bulletin for 2009–10, the men's baseball team receiving the WVIAC Sportsmanship Award for 2008–09, the women's cheerleading squad taking third place for the WVIAC Presidents' Cup in 2007–08, the women's golf team finishing sixth place at the WVIAC Women's Golf Championship in 2009, and the 2009 WVIAC Coach Poll ranking the WVSU women's volleyball team at number 2 for the start of the 2009 season.

== Notable athletes ==
- Earl Lloyd (basketball)
- Dennis Gardeck (football)
