= Beaver Field at Jim and Bettie Smith Stadium =

Baseball stadium in Boone, North Carolina

Jim and Bettie Smith Stadium
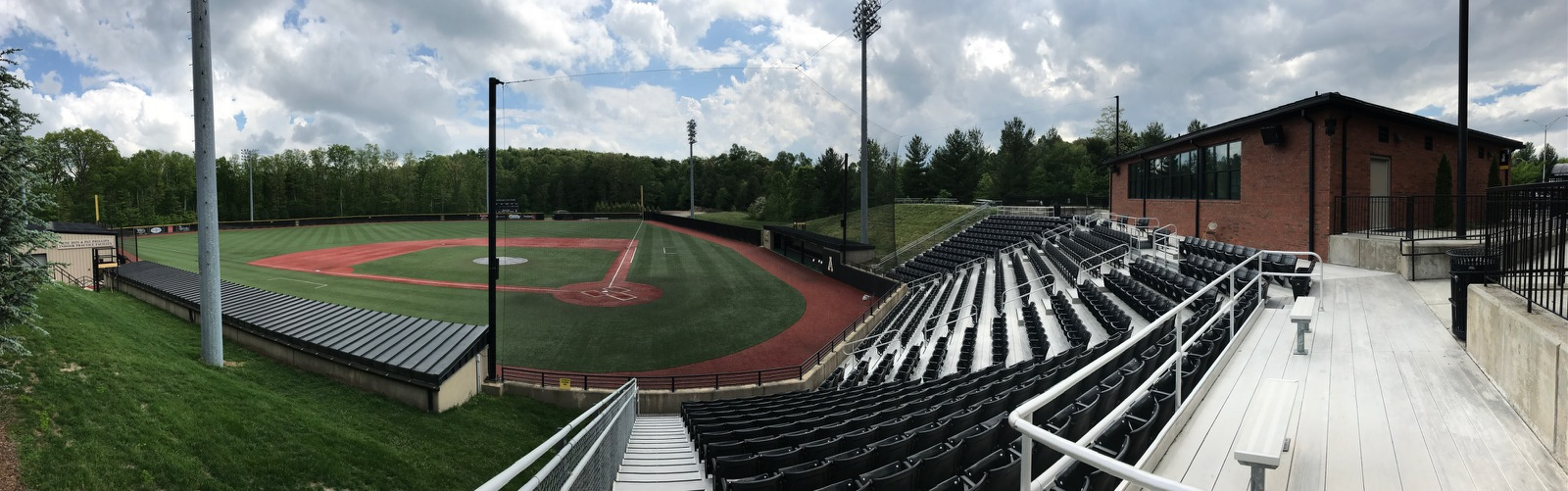

- Location within North Carolina Location within the United States
- Interactive map of Jim and Bettie Smith Stadium
- Full name: Beaver Field at Jim and Bettie Smith Stadium
- Location: Boone, North Carolina 28608
- Coordinates: 36°12′42″N 81°41′36″W
- Owner: Appalachian State University
- Operator: Appalachian State University
- Capacity: 1,000
- Surface: AstroTurf
- Record attendance: 1,376 (Baseball; Appalachian State vs. Wake Forest; April 11, 2023)
- Field size: Left field: 338 feet (103 m); Left center: 390 feet (120 m); Center field: 415 feet (126 m); Right center: 383 feet (117 m); Right field: 333 feet (101 m)

Construction
- Opened: April 10, 2007

Tenant
- Appalachian State Mountaineers (NCAA) 2007–present

Beaver Field at Jim and Bettie Smith Stadium is a baseball stadium in Boone, North Carolina, that is home to the Appalachian State baseball program. Prior to using Beaver Field, the Mountaineers used Lackey Field. The stadium was dedicated on April 10, 2007, with the Mountaineers claiming a 6–1 victory over Gardner-Webb. Appalachian selected AstroTurf as the playing surface for the new stadium, joining a select group of NCAA Division I and MLB programs to use the mix of silica sand and cryogenic rubber to emulate natural grass. The stadium has been mentioned in national publications for its beauty, especially during the fall season.

The stadium has seating for 1,000, including grandstands behind home plate, grass seating along the first base line, and fire pits that seat 4-6 people in the outfield. The student section at Smith Stadium is located in the grandstands on the first base side.

In addition to Beaver Field, Smith Stadium is also home to Beaver Clubhouse, Don and Pat Phillips Indoor Hitting Facility, and a press box.

== See also ==
- List of NCAA Division I baseball venues
