= Gulfview Park =

Baseball park in Galveston, Texas, US

- Pirate Field (1915-1920)
- Interactive map of Gulfview Park
- Full name: Gulfview Park
- Location: Galveston, Texas
- Coordinates: 29.2876409°N 94.7985657°W
- Capacity: 4,000
- Surface: Grass

Construction
- Opened: 1915
- Closed: 1924

Tenants
- Galveston Pirates (Texas League) (1915-1921); Galveston Sand Crabs (Texas League) (1922-1924)

Gulfview Park was a ballpark located in Galveston, Texas, United States, and existed for ten seasons use by the Texas League Galveston baseball clubs. From home plate to right field measured 260 feet, and the Blue Goose Saloon was located nearby to right field.

Gulfview Park/Pirate Field was located at 2802 Avenue R, Galveston, Texas, 77550. The ballpark had a capacity of 4,000. It had dimensions of 260 RF and was called Pirate Field when hosting the Pirates. The ballpark was damaged by a tropical storm on August 15, 1915, and the park was unusable for the remainder of the season.

== See also ==
- Pirate Field
- Beach Park (Galveston)
- Moody Stadium

== Sources ==
- "Baseball in the Lone Star State: Texas League's Greatest Hits," Tom Kayser and David King, Trinity University Press 2005
- "The Texas League 1888-1987: A Century of Baseball," Bill O'Neal, c.1987
