= Michael Cherry =

Michael Cherry may refer to:

- Michael Cherry (judge) (born 1944), American judge
- Michael Cherry (athlete) (born 1995), American track sprinter

== See also ==
- Mike Cherry (disambiguation)
