= 1951 Southern Conference baseball tournament =

- Teams: 4
- Format: Single-elimination tournament
- Finals site: Greensboro, North Carolina
- Champions: Duke (1st title)
- Winning coach: Jack Coombs (1st title)

The 1951 Southern Conference baseball tournament was held in Greensboro, North Carolina, from May 20 and 21. The South Division's second seed Duke won the tournament, the first of three tournament titles prior to the Atlantic Coast Conference creation for the 1954 season.

The tournament used a single-elimination format.

== Bracket ==
Semifinals
2S	Duke	11
1N	Maryland	0
2N	West Virginia	2
1S	Clemson	6

Finals
2S	Duke	5
1S	Clemson	0
Third place
1N	Maryland	3
2N	West Virginia	4
