= West Virginia State Yellow Jackets baseball =

College baseball team

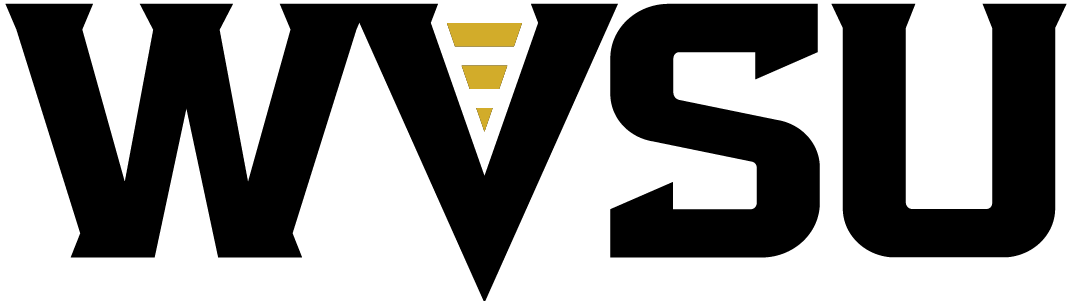
- Founded: 1949
- University: West Virginia State University
- Athletic director: David Hicks
- Head coach: Sean Loyd (12th season)
- Conference: MEC; South Division
- Location: Institute, West Virginia
- Home stadium: Calvin L. Bailey Field (capacity: 500)
- Nickname: Yellow Jackets
- Colors: Old gold and black

College World Series appearances
- 1999, 2005

NCAA regional champions
- 1999, 2005

NCAA tournament appearances
- 1998, 1999, 2000, 2001, 2002, 2004, 2005, 2006, 2007, 2008, 2009, 2010, 2015, 2021

Conference tournament champions
- 1998, 1999, 2000, 2002, 2003, 2005, 2007, 2008, 2014, 2015, 2021

Conference regular season champions
- 1959, 1978, 1979, 1982, 1986, 1993, 1994, 1997, 1999, 2000, 2002, 2003, 2005, 2007, 2008, 2014, 2016, 2021

Conference division regular season champions
- 2004, 2005, 2006, 2007, 2008, 2009, 2010, 2013, 2016, 2021

The West Virginia State Yellow Jackets baseball team represents the West Virginia State University in NCAA Division II college baseball. Along with the other WV State athletic teams, the baseball team participates in the Mountain East Conference. The Yellow Jackets play their home games in Calvin L. Bailey Field and they are currently coached by Sean Loyd.
