= Lackey Field =

Athletics field in Boone, North Carolina

Coordinates: 36.211°N 81.676°W

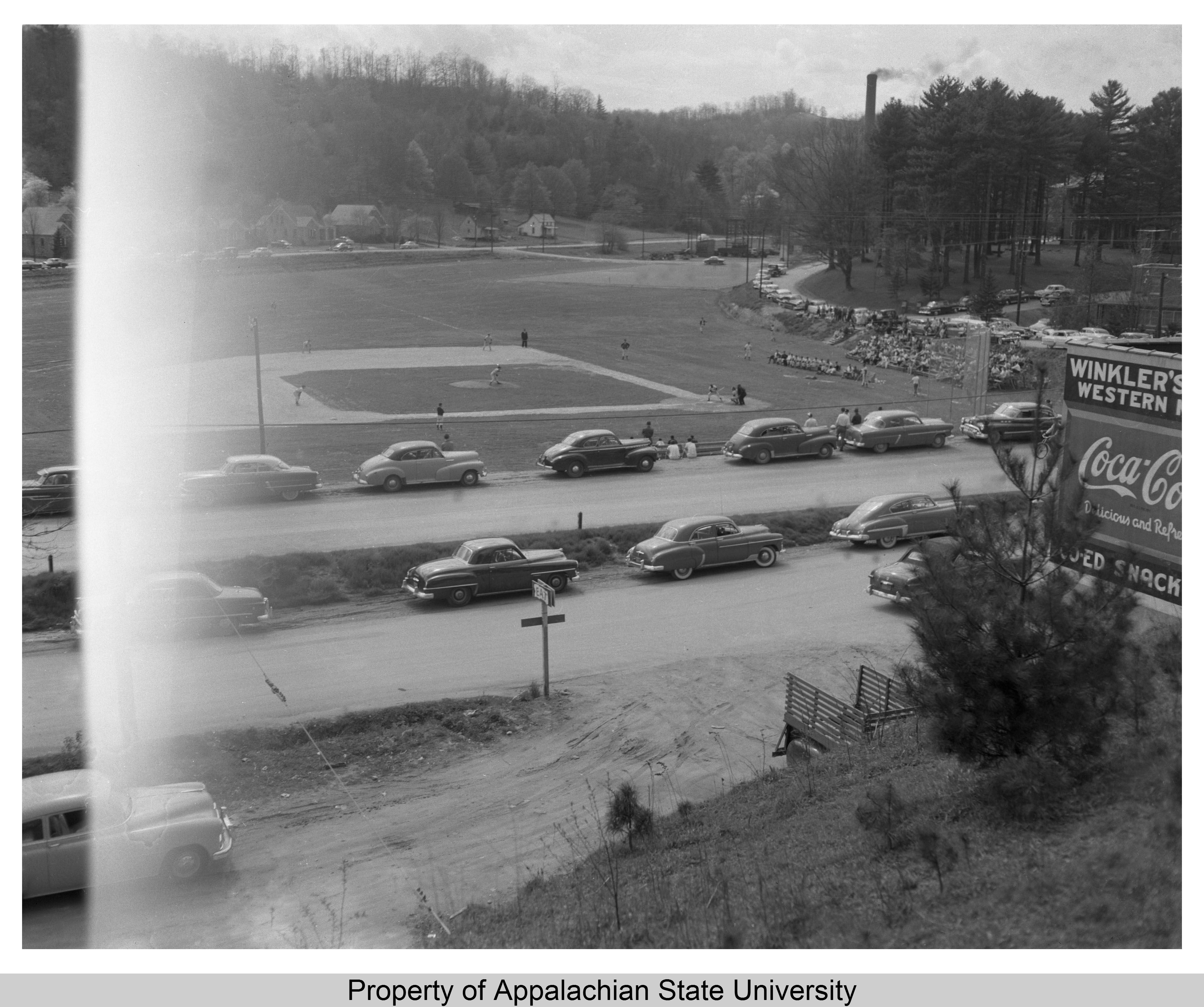
Shows the baseball team playing at Red Lackey Field, located approximately where Holmes Convocation Center, now stands.

Red Lackey Field was a baseball and athletics field at Appalachian State University. The field was renamed Red Lackey Field in 1987 and originally in the current location of Durham Park and Holmes Convocation Center. Pictures of Lackey Field date back to the early 1950s. Red Lackey Field was named for E. G. Lackey, who graduated from Appalachian State in 1937, and served on the Board of Trustees for eighteen years. The Mountaineers began playing at Beaver Field at Jim and Bettie Smith Stadium in 2007.
