= Sarge Frye Field =

Former baseball park at University of South Carolina

Coordinates: 33°59′7″N 81°1′22″W

- "The Sarge"
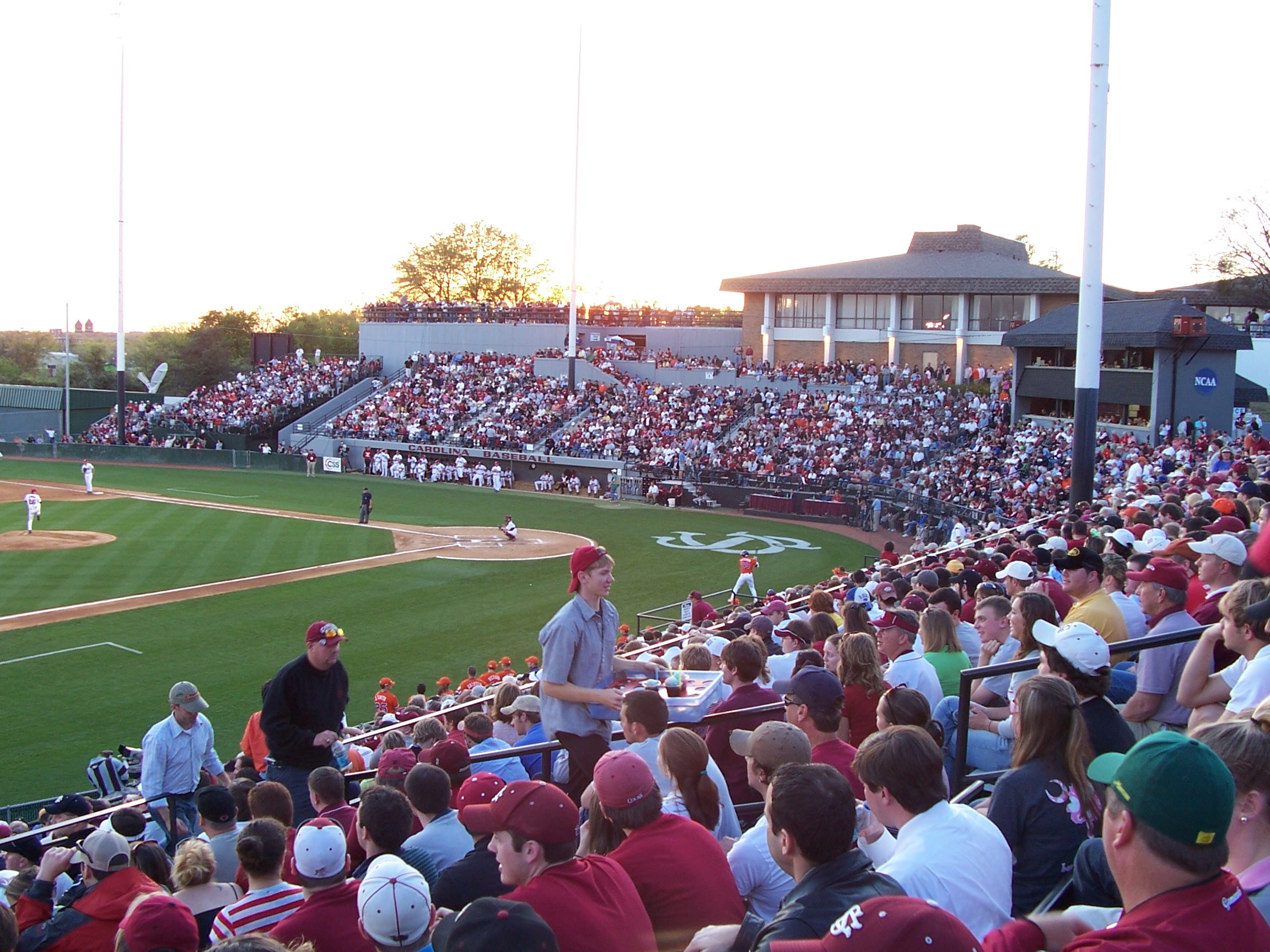
- Interactive map of Sarge Frye Field
- Former names: Unknown (1977–1980)
- Location: Columbia, South Carolina
- Capacity: 5,000

Construction
- Opened: March 1, 1977
- Closed: May 17, 2008
- Demolished: 2010

Tenant
- South Carolina Gamecocks Baseball Team (1977–2008)

Sarge Frye Field was a baseball stadium in Columbia, South Carolina and served as home field of the University of South Carolina Gamecock baseball team until the 2008 season. The stadium held 6,000 people and was named after a longtime grounds keeper of the school's athletic fields. On February 21, 2009, USC began playing at the new Carolina Stadium. The last game at Sarge Frye was played on May 17, 2008. The field was named after Weldon B. "Sarge" Frye on May 11, 1980. It was demolished in 2010.
