= Jeff Barkley =

American baseball player (born 1959)

- Pitcher
- Born: November 21, 1959 (age 66); Hickory, North Carolina, U.S.
- Batted: Both Threw: Right

MLB debut
- September 16, 1984, for the Cleveland Indians

Last MLB appearance
- July 26, 1985, for the Cleveland Indians

MLB statistics
- Win–loss record: 0–3
- Earned run average: 5.40
- Strikeouts: 34
- Stats at Baseball Reference

Teams
- Cleveland Indians (1984–1985)

Jeffrey Carver Barkley (born November 21, 1959) is an American former Major League Baseball pitcher who played for the Cleveland Indians for two seasons from 1984 to 1985.

Barkley played college baseball for The Citadel where he set a school record in strikeouts with 237. He was inducted into The Citadel's Athletics Hall of Fame in 2002.

Barkley made his Major League debut on September 16, 1984, against the Oakland Athletics. Manager Pat Corrales made the unconventional choice to pull pitcher Tom Waddell in the middle of a plate appearance and insert Barkley, who had been called up from the Maine Guides only two days earlier. Barkley inherited a two-strike count against Mike Davis and struck him out on the first pitch he threw in the Major Leagues.

Barkley never won a game at the major league level, but did pick up one career save. It came on July 1, 1985, against the Minnesota Twins. Barkley pitched 2 2/3 perfect innings to close out a 5-2 Indians victory. He saved the game for starter Vern Ruhle.
