= Latham Baseball Stadium =

Baseball stadium in Greenville, South Carolina

- Interactive map of Latham Baseball Stadium
- Full name: John T. and Gloria Latham Baseball Stadium
- Former names: Furman Baseball Stadium (1956–2008)
- Location: 1612 Duncan Chapel Road, Greenville, South Carolina, US
- Coordinates: 34.921472°N 82.44256°W
- Owner: Furman University
- Capacity: 2,000
- Surface: Natural grass
- Scoreboard: Electronic
- Field size: 330 ft. (LF); 350 ft. (LCF); 393 ft. (CF); 371 ft. (RCF); 330 ft. (RF)

Construction
- Built: 1956
- Opened: March 20, 1956
- Renovated: 1998, 2001

Tenant
- Furman University Paladins college baseball (SoCon) (1956–2020)

Latham Baseball Stadium is a baseball venue located in Greenville, South Carolina, US. It was home to the Furman Paladins college baseball team until it was discontinued in 2020. The venue opened in 1956 and has a capacity of 2,000 spectators.

== Naming ==
The stadium is named after Tommy Latham and his family. Latham was an All-Conference baseball player at Furman. The venue was renamed and dedicated to him and his family in May 2008 prior to a conference game against Davidson, with the park's full name becoming John T. and Gloria Latham Baseball Stadium (John and Gloria Latham are the parents of the Paladin baseball player Tommy). The Latham family made a contribution of $1 million for the park to be renamed. Prior to the renaming, the field had been known as Furman Baseball Stadium since its construction in 1956.

== Features ==
In 1997, the field's seating areas were renovated, with 300 permanent stadium seats being added behind home plate. In 2001, lights were added to the facility, allowing night games to be played for the first time. The first night game was played on April 13, 2001, against UNC Greensboro. In 2006, batting cage was added to the facility; it is located down the left field line. The stadium also features a press box, scoreboard, and expanded dugouts.

== See also ==
- List of NCAA Division I baseball venues
