= Galveston Pirates =

The Galveston Pirates were a Texas League baseball team based in Galveston, Texas, United States that existed from 1912 to 1917 and from 1919 to 1921.

Galveston was minor league baseball home to the Galveston White Caps (1950–1955), Galveston Buccaneers (1931–1937), the earlier Galveston Sand Crabs (1889–1890, 1892, 1897–99, 1907–1911, 1922–1924), Galveston Pirates (1912–17, 1919–1921) and Galveston Giants (1888).

== Home venues ==
=== Beach Park ===
Beach Park was the home venue of the Galveston Pirates from 1912 to 1914. On September 7, 1913, the final day of the baseball season, the San Antonio Bronchos and Galveston Pirates played a game that lasted 49 minutes, the fastest game in Texas League history in order to avoid rain in the area. Galveston won 4–1 over San Antonio.

=== Pirate Field ===
Pirate Field was the home of the Galveston Pirates from 1915 to 1920.

=== Gulfview Park ===
Gulfview Park existed for five years for the Texas League Galveston baseball clubs and was the home of the Pirates in 1921. From home plate to right field measured 260 feet, and the Blue Goose Saloon was located nearby to right field.

== Sources ==
- "Baseball in the Lone Star State: Texas League's Greatest Hits," Tom Kayser and David King, Trinity University Press 2005
- "The Texas League 1888-1987: A Century of Baseball," Bill O'Neal, c.1987
