= Tim Jones (infielder) =

American baseball player (born 1962)

- Shortstop
- Born: December 1, 1962 (age 63); Sumter, South Carolina, U.S.
- Batted: Left Threw: Right

MLB debut
- July 26, 1988, for the St. Louis Cardinals

Last MLB appearance
- October 2, 1993, for the St. Louis Cardinals

MLB statistics
- Batting average: .233
- Home runs: 1
- Runs batted in: 28
- Stats at Baseball Reference

Teams
- St. Louis Cardinals (1988–1993)

William Timothy Jones (born December 1, 1962) is an American former professional baseball infielder. He is an alumnus of The Citadel.

Drafted by the St. Louis Cardinals in the 2nd round of the 1985 Major League Baseball draft, Jones made his Major League Baseball debut with the St. Louis Cardinals on July 26, 1988, and appeared in his final game on October 2, 1993.
