= Mike Cherry (baseball) =

- Pitcher
- Born: August 1, 1962 (age 63)
- Throws: Right
- Stats at Baseball Reference

Mike Cherry (born August 1, 1962) is an American former baseball player who was named an All-American in 1983 by both the American Baseball Coaches Association and Baseball America, the only two recognized selectors in 1983. Cherry was a pitcher for The Citadel and was drafted in the second round (38th overall) of the 1983 Major League Baseball draft by the Los Angeles Dodgers.

A three-year letterwinner at The Citadel, Cherry earned Southern Conference Player of the Year honors in 1983 after leading the nation in strikeouts (132) and strikeouts per nine innings (13.7) en route to a 12–0 record for the 34–10 NCAA tournament participants. He went on to play four seasons in the minor leagues, reaching Class-AA with the Dodgers organization. He recently coached at Hilton Head Christian Academy with the baseball program.
