= Hennon Stadium =

Stadium in Cullowhee, North Carolina

Ronnie G. Childress Field at Hennon Stadium
- Interactive map of Ronnie G. Childress Field at Hennon Stadium
- Former names: Childress Field (1978–1994)
- Location: Cullowhee, NC
- Coordinates: 35°18′04″N 83°10′52″W
- Owner: Western Carolina University
- Operator: Western Carolina University
- Capacity: 1,500
- Surface: Natural Grass: Bermuda
- Field size: Left Field: 325 ft (99 m); Left-Center Field: 375 ft (114 m); Center Field: 390 ft (120 m); Right-Center Field: 375 ft (114 m); Right Field: 325 ft (99 m)

Construction
- Opened: 1978; 48 years ago
- Renovated: 1990, 1991, 2002, 2003, 2009
- Cost: Initial $125,000; $1 million in upgrades

Tenant
- Western Carolina Catamounts (NCAA) (1978–present)

Website
- Hennon Stadium

Ronnie G. Childress Field at Hennon Stadium is the home of the Western Carolina Catamounts baseball team in Cullowhee, North Carolina.

== Dimensions ==
The baseball field’s dimensions are 325 feet (99 m) down each line, 375 feet (114 m) to the right and left center power alleys and 390 feet (120 m) to straight away center field. The “Purple Monster” in left field is 100 feet (30 m) long and is divided into two 50-foot (15 m) levels. The first and tallest level is 20 feet (6.1 m) high and the second level is 14 feet (4.3 m) tall.

The “Purple Monster” Sec. I: 20’ tall & 50’ long – Sec. II: 14’ tall & 50’ long

== History ==
Hennon Stadium has been home to the Western Carolina University baseball program for 32 years. The baseball facility was officially renamed Childress Field at Hennon Stadium in a dedication ceremony on April 23, 1994.

In 1978, the WCU baseball program moved approximately 200 yards to the east from Haywood Field. Bill Haywood, head baseball coach from 1969 through 1981, and Mr. E.J. Whitmire, a baseball supporter and benefactor from Franklin, North Carolina were the driving forces behind the building of the facility. The initial cost of the facility in 1978 was $125,000. It was named in honor of the late Ronnie G. Childress, who was a special friend of the baseball program. The James B. Childress family established the Ronnie Childress Memorial Fund Scholarships in 1975 and scholarships have been awarded annually to select WCU baseball players since the fund's inception.

Hennon Stadium has been renovated several times since its construction and has become a showplace of Southern Conference baseball. Permanent bleacher seating, grandstand chair back seats, and a press box were installed prior to 1990 season. A new scoreboard, concession stands, rest rooms, and a new infield were added prior to the 1991 season.

Childress Field was refurbished in 2003 with nearly $500,000 worth of improvements that included new drainage and irrigation, a Bermuda grass playing surface, a new warning track, and a new infield playing surface. The baseball field and stadium received yet another renovation in 2011 (of approx. $600,000) which included dugout upgrades, the entire stadium painted, new lower-level seating as the stadium was moved 14 feet closer to home plate to accommodate two rows of new chair-back seats. A 36-inch red brick wall was built that stretches between the dugouts in front of the new Yankee Stadium-style slatted seats. A 48-inch brick wall stretches from each dugout to the outfield fence down the left and right field lines. A batter’s eye has been attached to the centerfield fence and the “purple monster” in left field was repainted.

A new clubhouse on the first-base side and stadium seating design are currently in planning stages.

== Southern Conference Tournament ==
Western Carolina hosted the 1984 and 1986 Southern Conference baseball tournaments at the facility.

== See also ==
- List of NCAA Division I baseball venues
