= Western Carolina Catamounts baseball =

College baseball team

Western Carolina Catamounts
- 2026 Western Carolina Catamounts baseball team
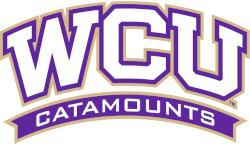
- Founded: 1928
- University: Western Carolina University
- Head coach: Alan Beck (4th season)
- Conference: Southern Conference
- Location: Cullowhee, North Carolina
- Home stadium: Hennon Stadium
- Nickname: Catamounts
- Colors: Purple and gold

NCAA tournament appearances
- 1985, 1986, 1987, 1988, 1989, 1992, 1993, 1994, 1997, 2003, 2007, 2016

Conference tournament champions
- 1985, 1986, 1987, 1988, 1989, 1992, 1993, 1997, 2003, 2016

Conference regular season champions
- 1981, 1984, 1986, 1987, 1988, 1989, 1992, 1994, 1997, 2003, 2007, 2013, 2014

The Western Carolina Catamounts baseball team represents Western Carolina University in NCAA Division I college baseball. The team participates in the Southern Conference.

== NCAA Tournament ==
Western Carolina has participated in the NCAA Division I baseball tournament twelve times. The 1992 team reached the Regional Final, losing in two games. They have a record of 13–25.

Year	Region	Opponent	Result
1985	East Regional	Old Dominion; La Salle; St. John's; South Carolina	W 5–3; L 12–13; W 9–6; L 3–14
1986	Atlantic Regional	Georgia Tech; Miami	L 7–8 (11); L 8–10
1987	Mideast Regional	Oklahoma State; Purdue; Mississippi State; Oklahoma State	L 3–6; W 8–7; W 8–1; L 6–9
1988	South Regional	Mississippi State; Texas A&M	L 4–7; L 6–8
1989	South Regional	Mississippi State; Indiana State	L 0–8; L 3–10
1992	South II Regional	Florida State; Kent State; Stanford; Florida State; Florida State	L 0–1; W 14–1; W 5–0; L 3–4; L 3–18
1993	South Regional	LSU; Miami; Kent State	L 2–7; W 10–5; L 5–8
1994	Mideast Regional	Arizona State; Tennessee	L 6–8; L 4–6
1997	East Regional	Auburn; Marist; South Florida	L 3–11; W 8–3; L 4–9
2003	Coral Gables Super Regional; Wilson Regional	VCU; Le Moyne; VCU; NC State	L 0–6; W 9–5; W 2–0; L 4–6 (14)
2007	Chapel Hill Super Regional; Chapel Hill Regional	East Carolina; Jacksonville; East Carolina; North Carolina	L 8–9; W 7–0; W 9–5; L 5–6
2016	Columbia Super Regional; Clemson Regional	Clemson; Nebraska; Clemson	L 10–24; W 4–1; L 3–15

== List of head coaches ==
Coach	Tenure	Record
Jim Gudger	1951–1960, 1963	140–83
Charles Seeger	1961–1962	20–21
Ron Blackburn	1964–1968	78–65
Bill Haywood	1969–81	216–158–2
David Wright	1982	28–12
Jack Leggett	1983–1991	302–226
Keith LeClair	1992–97	228–135–2
Rodney Hennon	1998–1999	81–38
Todd Raleigh	2000–07	257–209
Bobby Moranda	2008–2022	406–392–3
Alan Beck	2023–present	79–87
