= Appalachian State Mountaineers baseball =

- 2026 Appalachian State Mountaineers baseball team
- University: Appalachian State University
- Head coach: Kermit Smith (10th season)
- Conference: Sun Belt; East Division
- Location: Boone, North Carolina
- Home stadium: Beaver Field at Jim and Bettie Smith Stadium (Capacity: 2,000)
- Nickname: Mountaineers
- Colors: Black and gold

NCAA tournament appearances
- 1973, 1984, 1985, 1986, 1987, 2012

Conference tournament champions
- 1984

Conference regular season champions
- 1973, 1984, 1985, 1986, 1987, 2012

The Appalachian State Mountaineers baseball team is a varsity intercollegiate athletic team of Appalachian State University in Boone, North Carolina, United States. The team is a member of the Sun Belt Conference, which is part of NCAA Division I. Appalachian State's first baseball team was fielded in 1903. The team plays its home games at Beaver Field at Jim and Bettie Smith Stadium in Boone, North Carolina. The Mountaineers are coached by Kermit Smith.

== Appalachian State in the NCAA tournament ==
| Year | Record | Pct | Notes |
|---|---|---|---|
| 1973 | 2–2 | .500 | District 3 |
| 1984 | 0–2 | .000 | South II Regional |
| 1986 | 0–2 | .000 | Midwest Regional |
| 2012 | 2–2 | .500 | Charlottesville Regional |
| TOTALS | 4-8 | .333 | |

== Major League Baseball ==
Appalachian State has had 50 Major League Baseball draft selections since the draft began in 1965.

Mountaineers in the Major League Baseball Draft
| Year | Player | Round | Team |
|---|---|---|---|
| 1969 | Charlie Cromer | 23 | White Sox |
| 1970 | Samuel Miller | 31 | Senators |
| 1970 | Bobby Billings | 28 | Senators |
| 1970 | Ron Hodges | 6 | Orioles |
| 1971 | Ron Hodges | 1 | Braves |
| 1971 | Ron Hodges | 1 | Royals |
| 1972 | John Shermer | 9 | White Sox |
| 1972 | Ron Hodges | 2 | Mets |
| 1975 | Mike Ramsey | 3 | Cardinals |
| 1977 | Ronald Brower | 10 | Expos |
| 1979 | Randy Ingle | 14 | Braves |
| 1982 | Mark Poston | 22 | Padres |
| 1982 | Kirk Bailey | 13 | Yankees |
| 1984 | Richard Bosley | 25 | Orioles |
| 1984 | Amos Hardee | 21 | Expos |
| 1985 | Tony Welborn | 21 | Royals |
| 1985 | Richard Bosley | 10 | Brewers |
| 1985 | Todd Welborn | 4 | Mets |
| 1986 | Kent Alexander | 22 | Cubs |
| 1986 | Tony Welborn | 3 | Expos |
| 1990 | Steven Hollins | 41 | Phillies |
| 1996 | Scott Garrett | 23 | Reds |
| 1996 | Scott Musgrave | 11 | Red Sox |
| 2008 | Garrett Sherrill | 12 | Brewers |
| 2008 | Jason Rook | 12 | Orioles |
| 2008 | David Rubinstein | 11 | Pirates |
| 2009 | Josh Dowdy | 38 | Orioles |
| 2009 | Issac Harrow | 24 | Yankees |
| 2009 | Rand Smith | 20 | Marlins |
| 2009 | Zach Quate | 14 | Rays |
| 2010 | Wes Hobson | 40 | Giants |
| 2010 | Christopher Patterson | 29 | Cardinals |
| 2012 | Ryan Arrowood | 28 | Rockies |
| 2012 | Colton Grant | 26 | Marlins |
| 2012 | Tyler Tewell | 14 | Braves |
| 2012 | Nate Hyatt | 13 | Braves |
| 2013 | Will Callaway | 37 | Giants |
| 2013 | Hector Crespo | 34 | Yankees |
| 2013 | Sam Agnew-Wieland | 24 | Yankees |
| 2013 | Rob Marcello | 17 | Phillies |
| 2015 | Jeffrey Springs | 30 | Rangers |
| 2015 | Jaylin Davis | 24 | Twins |
| 2015 | Dillon Dobson | 23 | Giants |
| 2015 | Michael Pierson | 21 | Angels |
| 2017 | Chandler Seagle | 30 | Padres |
| 2017 | Matt Brill | 12 | Diamondbacks |
| 2018 | Colin Schmid | 13 | Cardinals |
| 2020 | Jack Hartman | 4 | Pirates |
| 2023 | Xander Hamilton | 14 | Twins |
| 2024 | Austin St. Laurent | 14 | Mariners |

== See also ==
- List of NCAA Division I baseball programs
