= Big South Conference baseball tournament =

Conference baseball championship

- Conference baseball championship
- Sport: Baseball
- Conference: Big South Conference
- Number of teams: 6
- Format: Double-elimination
- Current stadium: Truist Point
- Current location: High Point, NC
- Played: 1985–88, 1990–93, 1997–present
- Last contest: 2026
- Current champion: USC Upstate (2)
- Most championships: Coastal Carolina (14)
- Official website: BigSouthSports.com baseball

Host stadiums
- HomeTrust Park (2009, 2026); Truist Point (2022–2025); Segra Stadium (2019–2021); Lexington County Baseball Stadium (2016–18); John Henry Moss Stadium (2015); Winthrop Ballpark (2002, 2003, 2004, 2007, 2010, 2014); Liberty Baseball Stadium (2013); George S. Erath Field at Coy O. Williard Baseball Stadium (2012); Gray–Minor Stadium (2011); Dan Daniel Memorial Park (2001, 2008); Charles Watson Stadium (1990, 1991, 1992, 1993, 1999, 2000, 2005, 2006); Knights Stadium (1997, 1998); Taylor Field (1985, 1987, 1988); Augusta State University (1986)

Host locations
- Asheville, NC (2009, 2026); High Point, NC (2012, 2022–2025); Fayetteville, NC (2019–2021); Lexington, SC (2016–18); Boiling Springs, NC (2015); Rock Hill, SC (2002, 2003, 2004, 2007, 2010, 2014); Lynchburg, VA (2013); Lexington, VA (2011); Danville, VA (2001, 2008); Conway, SC (1990, 1991, 1992, 1993, 1999, 2000, 2005, 2006); Fort Mill, SC (1997, 1998); Buies Creek, NC (1985, 1987, 1988); Augusta, GA (1986)

The Big South Conference baseball tournament, sometimes referred to simply as the Big South tournament, is the conference baseball championship of the NCAA Division I Big South Conference. The top eight finishers in the regular season of the conference's 11 teams advance to the double-elimination tournament, which is currently held at a neutral site at Segra Stadium in Fayetteville, North Carolina, from 2019 to 2021. The winner of the tournament receives an automatic berth to the NCAA Division I Tournament.

== Champions ==
=== By year ===
The following is a list of conference champions and sites listed by year.

| Year | Champion | Venue | MVP |
|---|---|---|---|
| 1985 | Winthrop | Taylor Field • Buies Creek, NC | Jeff Dodig, Winthrop and John Posey, Campbell |
| 1986 | Coastal Carolina | Augusta State University • Augusta, GA | Terry Spires, Coastal Carolina |
| 1987 | Winthrop | Taylor Field • Buies Creek, NC | Mike Michener, Armstrong State |
| 1988 | Campbell | Taylor Field • Buies Creek, NC | Rob Palentchar, Campbell |
| 1989 | No Tournament | | |
| 1990 | Campbell | Charles Watson Stadium • Conway, SC | Chris Wagner, Campbell |
| 1991 | Coastal Carolina | Charles Watson Stadium • Conway, SC | Buddy Cribb, Coastal Carolina |
| 1992 | Coastal Carolina | Charles Watson Stadium • Conway, SC | Paul Leszcznski, Coastal Carolina |
| 1993 | Liberty | Charles Watson Stadium • Conway, SC | Rich Humphrey, Liberty |
| 1994–1996 | No Tournament | | |
| 1997 | UNC Greensboro | Knights Stadium • Fort Mill, SC | Jason Parsons, UNC Greensboro |
| 1998 | Liberty | Knights Stadium • Fort Mill, SC | David Dalton, Liberty |
| 1999 | Winthrop | Charles Watson Stadium • Conway, SC | Matt Kozaria, Winthrop |
| 2000 | Liberty | Charles Watson Stadium • Conway, SC | Jason Suitt, Liberty |
| 2001 | Coastal Carolina | Dan Daniel Memorial Park • Danville, VA | Randy McGarvey, Coastal Carolina |
| 2002 | Coastal Carolina | Winthrop Ballpark • Rock Hill, SC | Adam Keim, Coastal Carolina |
| 2003 | Coastal Carolina | Winthrop Ballpark • Rock Hill, SC | Steven Carter, Coastal Carolina |
| 2004 | Coastal Carolina | Winthrop Ballpark • Rock Hill, SC | Steven Carter, Coastal Carolina |
| 2005 | Winthrop | Charles Watson Stadium • Conway, SC | Daniel Carte, Winthrop |
| 2006 | UNC Asheville | Charles Watson Stadium • Conway, SC | Rob Vernon, UNC Asheville |
| 2007 | Coastal Carolina | Winthrop Ballpark • Rock Hill, SC | Tommy Baldridge, Coastal Carolina |
| 2008 | Coastal Carolina | Dan Daniel Memorial Park • Danville, VA | Tyler Bortnick, Coastal Carolina |
| 2009 | Coastal Carolina | McCormick Field • Asheville, NC | David Anderson, Coastal Carolina |
| 2010 | Coastal Carolina | Winthrop Ballpark • Rock Hill, SC | Daniel Bowman, Coastal Carolina |
| 2011 | Coastal Carolina | Gray–Minor Stadium • Lexington, VA | Keith Hardwick, Coastal Carolina |
| 2012 | Coastal Carolina | George S. Erath Field • High Point, NC | Ryan Connolly & Aaron Burke, Coastal Carolina |
| 2013 | Liberty | Liberty Baseball Stadium • Lynchburg, VA | Ashton Perritt, Liberty |
| 2014 | Campbell | Winthrop Ballpark • Rock Hill, SC | Ryan Thompson, Campbell |
| 2015 | Radford | John Henry Moss Stadium • Boiling Springs, NC | Hunter Higgerson, Radford |
| 2016 | Coastal Carolina | Lexington County Baseball Stadium • Lexington, SC | Mike Morrison, Coastal Carolina |
| 2017 | Radford | Lexington County Baseball Stadium • Lexington, SC | Kyle Zurak, Radford |
| 2018 | Campbell | Liberty Baseball Stadium • Lynchburg, VA | Matthew Barefoot, Campbell |
| 2019 | Campbell | Segra Stadium • Fayetteville, NC | Koby Collins, Campbell |
| 2020 | Cancelled due to the coronavirus pandemic | | |
| 2021 | Presbyterian College | Segra Stadium • Fayetteville, NC | Zacchaeus Rasberry, Presbyterian |
| 2022 | Campbell | Truist Point • High Point, NC | Zach Neto, Campbell |
| 2023 | Campbell | Truist Point • High Point, NC | Grant Knipp, Campbell |
| 2024 | High Point | Truist Point • High Point, NC | Eric Grintz, High Point |
| 2025 | USC Upstate | Truist Point • High Point, NC | Scott Campbell Jr., USC Upstate |
| 2026 | USC Upstate | HomeTrust Park • Asheville, NC | Wylie Waters, USC Upstate |

=== By school ===
The following is a list of conference champions listed by school.

| Program | Championships | Years |
|---|---|---|
| Coastal Carolina | 14 | 1986, 1991, 1992, 2001, 2002, 2003, 2004, 2007, 2008, 2009, 2010, 2011, 2012, 2016 |
| Campbell | 7 | 1988, 1990, 2014, 2018, 2019, 2022, 2023 |
| Liberty | 4 | 1993, 1998, 2000, 2013 |
| Winthrop | 4 | 1985, 1987, 1999, 2005 |
| Radford | 2 | 2015, 2017 |
| USC Upstate | 2 | 2025, 2026 |
| UNC Greensboro | 1 | 1997 |
| UNC Asheville | 1 | 2006 |
| Presbyterian | 1 | 2021 |
| High Point | 1 | 2024 |

- Italics indicate that the program is no longer a Big South member.
