= Big South Conference baseball awards =

The Big South Conference offers multiple annual baseball awards. These awards include the Coach of the Year, the Pitcher of the Year, the Player of the Year, the Freshmen of the year and the Newcomer of the year. The most recent winners are, respectively, Kane Sweeney, Clay Edmondson, Konni Durschlag, Wade Walton and Amp Phillips. The conference also has a yearly All-Big South first team and second team, as well as an All-Academic team.

== Coach of the Year ==
The Coach of the Year award was first presented in 1986. It is given annually to the conference's best head coach, as chosen by a vote of the Big South's coaches.

=== Winners by season ===
Below is a table of the award's winners.

| Season | Coach | School | Conf. (Rk.) | Overall |
|---|---|---|---|---|
| 1986 | Cal Koonce | Campbell | 14–3 (1st, East) | 31–20 |
| 1987 | Joe Roberts | Armstrong State | 9–3 (1st, West) | 47–15 |
| 1988 | John Vrooman | Coastal Carolina | 15–0 (1st) | 35–12 |
| 1989 | Scott Gines | Radford | 12–5 (2nd) | 27–19 |
| 1990 | John Vrooman (2) | Coastal Carolina | 14–2 (1st) | 40–19 |
| 1990 | Skip Fite | Augusta | 5–8 (6th) | 22–30 |
| 1991 | Horace Turbeville | Winthrop | 10–8 (T–3rd) | 22–22 |
| 1991 | Skip Fite (2) | Augusta | 13–5 (2nd) | 27–30 |
| 1992 | Dick Cooke | Davidson | 10–6 (2nd) | 28–25 |
| 1992 | Joe Hudak | Winthrop | 10–7 (3rd) | 29–29 |
| 1993 | John Jancuska | UMBC | 14–8 (2nd) | 26–17 |
| 1994 | Mike Gaski | UNC Greensboro | 20–6 (1st) | 39–18 |
| 1995 | Lew Kent | Radford | 17–7 (T–2nd) | 30–24 |
| 1995 | Joe Hudak (2) | Winthrop | 18–6 (1st) | 41–17 |
| 1996 | Randy Mazey | Charleston Southern | 17–4 (1st) | 30–24 |
| 1997 | Mike Gaski (2) | UNC Greensboro | 18–3 (1st) | 45–17 |
| 1998 | Dave Pastors | Liberty | 13–5 (1st) | 32–29 |
| 1999 | Gary Gilmore | Coastal Carolina | 10–2 (1st) | 43–15 |
| 2000 | Gary Murphy | Charleston Southern | 14–7 (2nd) | 31–31–1 |
| 2001 | Joe Hudak (3) | Winthrop | 18–3 (1st) | 48–16–1 |
| 2002 | Gary Gilmore (2) | Coastal Carolina | 16–5 (1st) | 44–19 |
| 2003 | Matt Myers | UNC Asheville | 12–9 (4th) | 27–28 |
| 2004 | Brian Shoop | Birmingham–Southern | 21–3 (1st) | 47–18 |
| 2005 | Gary Gilmore (3) | Coastal Carolina | 21–3 (1st) | 50–16 |
| 2006 | Sal Bando Jr. | High Point | 14–10 (4th) | 27–32 |
| 2007 | Gary Gilmore (4) | Coastal Carolina | 17–4 (1st) | 50–13 |
| 2008 | Gary Gilmore (5) | Coastal Carolina | 17–3 (1st) | 50–14 |
| 2009 | Gary Gilmore (6) | Coastal Carolina | 21–5 (1st) | 47–16 |
| 2010 | Gary Gilmore (7) | Coastal Carolina | 25–0 (1st) | 55–10 |
| 2011 | Stuart Lake | Charleston Southern | 15–12 (T–3rd) | 29–30 |
| 2012 | Gary Gilmore (8) | Coastal Carolina | 18–5 (1st) | 42–19 |
| 2013 | Greg Goff | Campbell | 19–5 (1st, North) | 49–10 |
| 2014 | Jim Toman | Liberty | 23–3 (1st, North) | 41–18 |
| 2015 | Joe Raccuia | Radford | 20–4 (1st) | 45–16 |
| 2016 | Gary Gilmore (9) | Coastal Carolina | 21–3 (1st) | 55–18 |
| 2017 | Tom Riginos | Winthrop | 17–7 (1st) | 34–24 |
| 2018 | Justin Haire | Campbell | 21–6 (1st) | 35–26 |
| 2019 | Rusty Stroupe | Gardner–Webb | 14–13 (T–5th) | 25–26 |
| 2021 | Jim Chester | Gardner–Webb | 27–13 (3rd) | 25–26 |
| 2021 | Justin Haire (2) | Campbell | 28–9 (1st) | 37–18 |
| 2022 | Justin Haire (3) | Campbell | 20–3 (1st) | 41–19 |
| 2023 | Justin Haire (4) | Campbell | 22–5 (1st) | 46–15 |
| 2024 | Elton Pollock | Presbyterian | 18–6 (1st) | 29–27 |
| 2025 | Kane Sweeney | USC Upstate | 19–5 (1st) | 36–25 |
| 2026 | Joey Hammond | High Point | 17–7 (1st) | 36–18 |

=== Winners by school ===
The following is a table of the schools whose coaches have won the award, along with the year each school joined the conference, the number of times it has won the award, and the years in which it has done so.

| School (year joined) | Awards | Seasons |
|---|---|---|
| Coastal Carolina (1986) (Note: Following the 2016 season, Coastal Carolina left to join the Sun Belt Conference.) | 11 | 1988, 1990, 1999, 2002, 2005, 2007, 2008, 2009, 2010, 2012, 2016 |
| Campbell (1986) (Note: Following the 2023 season, Campbell left to join the Coastal Athletic Association.) | 6 | 1986, 2013, 2018, 2021, 2022, 2023 |
| Winthrop (1986) | 5 | 1991, 1992, 1995, 2001, 2017 |
| Charleston Southern (1986) | 3 | 1996, 2000, 2011 |
| Radford (1986) | 3 | 1989, 1995, 2015 |
| Augusta (1986) (Note: Following the 1991 season, Augusta returned to Division II.) | 2 | 1990, 1991 |
| Gardner–Webb (2009) | 2 | 2019, 2021 |
| High Point (1999) | 2 | 2006, 2026 |
| Liberty (1992) (Note: Following the 2018 season, Liberty left to join the Atlantic Sun Conference.) | 2 | 1998, 2014 |
| UNC Greensboro (1993) (Note: Following the 1997 season, UNC Greensboro left to join the Southern Conference.) | 2 | 1994, 1997 |
| Armstrong State (1986) (Note: Following the 1987 season, Armstrong State returned to Division II.) | 1 | 1987 |
| Birmingham–Southern (2002) (Note: Following the 2006 season, Birmingham–Southern went to Division III.) | 1 | 2004 |
| Davidson (1991) (Note: Following the 1992 season, Davidson left to join the Southern Conference.) | 1 | 1992 |
| UMBC (1993) (Note: Following the 1998 season, UMBC left to join the Northeast Conference.) | 1 | 1993 |
| UNC Asheville (1986) | 1 | 2003 |
| Presbyterian (2009) | 1 | 2024 |
| USC Upstate (2019) | 1 | 2025 |

== Pitcher of the Year ==
The Pitcher of the Year award was first presented in 2007. It is given annually to the conference's best pitcher, as chosen by a vote of the Big South's coaches.

=== Winners by season ===
Below is a table of the award's winners.

| Season | Coach | School |
|---|---|---|
| 2007 | Bobby Gagg | Coastal Carolina |
| 2008 | Alan DeRatt | UNC Asheville |
| 2009 | Cody Wheeler | Coastal Carolina |
| 2010 | Anthony Meo | Coastal Carolina |
| 2011 | Matt Rein | Coastal Carolina |
| 2012 | Aaron Burke | Coastal Carolina |
| 2012 | Eddie Butler | Radford |
| 2013 | Ryan Thompson | Campbell |
| 2014 | Trey Lambert | Liberty |
| 2015 | Jared Lyons | Liberty |
| 2016 | Andrew Beckwith | Coastal Carolina |
| 2017 | Zack Ridgely | Radford |
| 2018 | Allan Winans | Campbell |
| 2019 | Michael Horrell | Campbell |
| 2021 | Jordan Marks | USC Upstate |
| 2022 | Thomas Harrington | Campbell |
| 2023 | Bobby Alcock | Gardner–Webb |
| 2024 | Daniel Eagen | Presbyterian |
| 2025 | Clay Edmondson | UNC Asheville |
| 2026 | Ty Brachbill | High Point |

=== Winners by school ===
The following is a table of the schools whose coaches have won the award, along with the year each school joined the conference, the number of times it has won the award, and the years in which it has done so.

| School (year joined) | Awards | Seasons |
|---|---|---|
| Coastal Carolina (1986) (Note: Following the 2016 season, Coastal Carolina left to join the Sun Belt Conference.) | 6 | 2007, 2009, 2010, 2011, 2012, 2016 |
| Campbell (1986) (Note: Following the 2023 season, Campbell left to join the Coastal Athletic Association.) | 4 | 2013, 2018, 2019, 2022 |
| Liberty (1992) (Note: Following the 2018 season, Liberty left to join the Atlantic Sun Conference.) | 2 | 2014, 2015 |
| UNC Asheville (1986) | 2 | 2008, 2025 |
| Radford (1986) | 2 | 2012, 2017 |
| Gardner–Webb (2009) | 1 | 2023 |
| High Point (1999) | 1 | 2026 |
| Presbyterian (2009) | 1 | 2024 |
| USC Upstate (2019) | 1 | 2021 |

== Player of the Year ==
The Player of the Year award was first presented in 1986. It is given annually to the conference's best player (non-pitcher as of 2007), as chosen by a vote of the Big South's coaches.

=== Winners by season ===
Below is a table of the award's winners.

| Season | Coach | School | Position |
|---|---|---|---|
| 1986 | Terry Spires | Coastal Carolina | SS |
| 1987 | Scott Goins | Winthrop | 2B |
| 1988 | no selection | | |
| 1989 | no selection | | |
| 1990 | Mark Romer | Coastal Carolina | OF |
| 1991 | J.C. Hendrix | Campbell | C |
| 1992 | Andy Paul | Davidson | P |
| 1993 | Kevin Loewe | UMBC | P |
| 1994 | Duane Filchner | Radford | OF |
| 1995 | Bryan Link | Winthrop | P |
| 1996 | Jeremy Keller | Winthrop | 1B |
| 1997 | Mark Cisar | Charleston Southern | P |
| 1998 | Jason Benham | Liberty | 3B |
| 1999 | Kevin Schnall | Coastal Carolina | C |
| 2000 | Keith Butler | Liberty | OF |
| 2001 | Jason Colson | Winthrop | 3B |
| 2002 | Justin Owens | Coastal Carolina | 1B |
| 2003 | R. J. Swindle | Charleston Southern | P |
| 2004 | Mike Costanzo | Coastal Carolina | DH |
| 2005 | Mike Costanzo (2) | Coastal Carolina | 1B/P |
| 2006 | Heath Rollins | Winthrop | P/1B |
| 2006 | Mark Shorey | High Point | OF |
| 2007 | Dave Sappelt | Coastal Carolina | OF |
| 2008 | Dock Doyle | Coastal Carolina | C |
| 2009 | David Anderson | Coastal Carolina | 1B |
| 2010 | Nate Roberts | High Point | OF |
| 2011 | Tommy La Stella | Coastal Carolina | 2B |
| 2012 | Daniel Bowman | Coastal Carolina | OF |
| 2013 | Rob Dickinson | VMI | OF |
| 2014 | Ryan Seiz | Liberty | 2B |
| 2015 | Cole Hallum | Campbell | UTL |
| 2016 | Connor Owings | Coastal Carolina | OF |
| 2017 | D.J. Artis | Liberty | OF |
| 2018 | Austen Zente | High Point | OF |
| 2019 | Chandler Redmond | Gardner–Webb | INF |
| 2021 | Zach Neto | Campbell | INF |
| 2022 | Zach Neto (2) | Campbell | INF |
| 2023 | Lawson Harrill | Campbell | OF |
| 2024 | Joel Dragoo | Presbyterian | OF |
| 2025 | Konni Durschlag | High Point | OF |
| 2026 | Seojun Oh | High Point | C |

=== Winners by school ===
The following is a table of the schools whose coaches have won the award, along with the year each school joined the conference, the number of times it has won the award, and the years in which it has done so.

| School (year joined) | Awards | Seasons |
|---|---|---|
| Coastal Carolina (1986) (Note: Following the 2016 season, Coastal Carolina left to join the Sun Belt Conference.) | 12 | 1986, 1990, 1999, 2002, 2004, 2005, 2007, 2008, 2009, 2011, 2012, 2016 |
| Campbell (1986) (Note: Following the 2023 season, Campbell left to join the Coastal Athletic Association.) | 5 | 1991, 2015, 2021, 2022, 2023 |
| High Point (1999) | 5 | 2006, 2010, 2018, 2025, 2026 |
| Winthrop (1986) | 5 | 1987, 1995, 1996, 2001, 2006 |
| Liberty (1992) (Note: Following the 2018 season, Liberty left to join the Atlantic Sun Conference.) | 4 | 1998, 2000, 2014, 2017 |
| Charleston Southern (1986) | 2 | 1997, 2003 |
| Davidson (1991) (Note: Following the 1992 season, Davidson left to join the Southern Conference.) | 1 | 1992 |
| Gardner–Webb (2009) | 1 | 2019 |
| UMBC (1993) (Note: Following the 1998 season, UMBC left to join the Northeast Conference.) | 1 | 1993 |
| Presbyterian (2009) | 1 | 2024 |
| Radford (1986) | 1 | 1994 |
| VMI (2004) (Note: Following the 2014 season, VMI left to join the Southern Conference.) | 1 | 2013 |

== Rookie/Freshman of the Year ==
The Rookie/Freshman of the Year award was first presented in 1994. It is given annually to the conference's best freshman, as chosen by a vote of the Big South's coaches.

=== Winners by season ===
Below is a table of the award's winners.

| Season | Coach | School | Position |
|---|---|---|---|
| 1994 | Reggie Davis | Campbell | C |
| 1995 | Tim Harrell | Liberty | P |
| 1996 | Jonathan Jackson | UNC Greensboro | P |
| 1997 | Scott Crandell | UMBC | OF |
| 1998 | Brooks Marzka | Coastal Carolina | OF |
| 1999 | Ryan Moffet | UNC Asheville | OF |
| 2000 | Keith Butler | Liberty | OF |
| 2001 | Jon Gore | Winthrop | INF |
| 2002 | R. J. Swindle | Charleston Southern | P |
| 2003 | Daniel Carte | Winthrop | OF |
| 2004 | David A. Williams | UNC Asheville | P |
| 2005 | Billy Froehlich | Birmingham–Southern | OF |
| 2006 | Alex Wilson | Winthrop | P |
| 2007 | Robby Kuzdale | High Point | OF |
| 2008 | Scott Woodward | Coastal Carolina | 3B |
| 2009 | Jeff Kemp | Radford | SS |
| 2010 | Cory Spangenberg | VMI | 2B |
| 2011 | Brad Zebedis | Presbyterian | DH/1B |
| 2012 | Alex Close | Liberty | 1B |
| 2013 | Seth Lamando | Coastal Carolina | P |
| 2014 | Parker Bean | Liberty | P |
| 2015 | Bobby Holmes | Coastal Carolina | P |
| 2016 | D.J. Artis | Liberty | OF |
| 2017 | Colten Rendon | Winthrop | P |
| 2018 | Logan Bender | Campbell | RP |
| 2019 | Ryan Chasse | Campbell | SP |
| 2021 | Thomas Harrington | Campbell | SP |
| 2022 | Noah Sullivan | USC Upstate | DH/P |
| 2023 | Jackson Roberts | Campbell | P |
| 2024 | Vance Sheahan | USC Upstate | INF |
| 2025 | Wade Walton | High Point | SP |
| 2026 | Bo Moody | Presbyterian | INF |

=== Winners by school ===
The following is a table of the schools whose coaches have won the award, along with the year each school joined the conference, the number of times it has won the award, and the years in which it has done so.

| School (year joined) | Awards | Seasons |
|---|---|---|
| Campbell (1986) (Note: Following the 2023 season, Campbell left to join the Coastal Athletic Association.) | 5 | 1994, 2018, 2019, 2021, 2023 |
| Liberty (1992) (Note: Following the 2018 season, Liberty left to join the Atlantic Sun Conference.) | 5 | 1995, 2000, 2012, 2014, 2016 |
| Coastal Carolina (1986) (Note: Following the 2016 season, Coastal Carolina left to join the Sun Belt Conference.) | 4 | 1998, 2008, 2013, 2015 |
| Winthrop (1986) | 4 | 2001, 2003, 2006, 2017 |
| High Point (1999) | 2 | 2007, 2025 |
| UNC Asheville (1986) | 2 | 1999, 2004 |
| Presbyterian (2009) | 2 | 2011, 2026 |
| USC Upstate (2019) | 2 | 2022, 2024 |
| Birmingham–Southern (2002) (Note: Following the 2006 season, Birmingham–Southern went to Division III.) | 1 | 2005 |
| Charleston Southern (1986) | 1 | 2002 |
| UMBC (1993) (Note: Following the 1998 season, UMBC left to join the Northeast Conference.) | 1 | 1997 |
| UNC Greensboro (1993) (Note: Following the 1997 season, UNC Greensboro left to join the Southern Conference.) | 1 | 1996 |
| Radford (1986) | 1 | 2009 |
| VMI (2004) (Note: Following the 2014 season, VMI left to join the Southern Conference.) | 1 | 2010 |

== Newcomer of the Year ==
The Newcomer of the Year award was first presented in 2024. It is given annually to the conference's best newcomer, as chosen by a vote of the Big South's coaches.

=== Winners by season ===
Below is a table of the award's winners.

| Season | Coach | School | Position |
|---|---|---|---|
| 2024 | Cade Conway | Charleston Southern | OF |
| 2025 | Amp Phillips | USC Upstate | SP |
| 2026 | Seojun Oh | High Point | C |

=== Winners by school ===
The following is a table of the schools whose coaches have won the award, along with the year each school joined the conference, the number of times it has won the award, and the years in which it has done so.

| School (year joined) | Awards | Seasons |
|---|---|---|
| Charleston Southern (1986) | 1 | 2024 |
| High Point (1999) | 1 | 2026 |
| USC Upstate (2019) | 1 | 2025 |
