= 2025 Big South Conference baseball tournament =

- Teams: 6
- Format: Double-elimination
- Finals site: Truist Point; High Point, North Carolina
- Champions: USC Upstate (1st title)
- Winning coach: Kane Sweeney (1st title)
- MVP: Scott Campbell (USC Upstate)
- Television: ESPN+

2025 Big South Conference baseball standings
	Conf.						Overall
Team	W		L		T	PCT	W		L		T	PCT
USC Upstate ‍†‍‡‍^{y}	19	–	5	–	0	.792	36	–	25	–	0	.590
High Point ‍‍‍	18	–	6	–	0	.750	39	–	19	–	0	.672
Charleston Southern ‍‍‍	14	–	10	–	0	.583	31	–	22	–	0	.585
Winthrop ‍‍‍	13	–	11	–	0	.542	31	–	29	–	0	.517
Radford ‍‍‍	13	–	11	–	0	.542	28	–	28	–	0	.500
Presbyterian ‍‍‍	9	–	15	–	0	.375	17	–	35	–	0	.327
UNC Asheville ‍‍‍	8	–	16	–	0	.333	15	–	35	–	1	.304
Longwood ‍‍‍	8	–	16	–	0	.333	14	–	38	–	0	.269
Gardner–Webb ‍‍‍	6	–	18	–	0	.250	17	–	36	–	0	.321
† – Conference champion ‡ – Tournament champion y – Invited to the NCAA Tournament; As of May 31, 2025; Rankings from D1Baseball

The 2025 Big South Conference baseball tournament was held from May 21 through 24 at Truist Point in High Point, North Carolina. The top six regular season finishers of the conference's nine teams met in the double-elimination tournament. This was a change from the previous year in which only the top four teams qualified for the conference tournament.

== Seeding and format ==
The top six finishers of the league's nine teams qualified for the double-elimination tournament. Teams were seeded based on conference winning percentage, with the first tiebreaker being head-to-head record.

== Results ==
Upper round 1	Upper round 2	Upper final	Final
5	Winthrop	0
5	Winthrop	6	1	USC Upstate	7
4	Radford	0	1	USC Upstate	13
2	High Point	9
3	Charleston Southern	14
6	Presbyterian	2	2	High Point	15 (10)
3	Charleston Southern	12
1	USC Upstate	14	–
3	Charleston Southern	2	–
Lower round 1	Lower round 2	Lower round 3	Lower final
2	High Point	8
3	Charleston Southern	13 (11)	3	Charleston Southern	18
5	Winthrop	13	5	Winthrop	12
4	Radford	9	4	Radford	4
6	Presbyterian	2

== Schedule ==
Game	Time*	Matchup^{#}	Score	Notes	Reference
Wednesday, May 21
1	11:00 am	No. 5 Winthrop vs No. 4 Radford	6−0		
2	3:00 pm	No. 6 Presbyterian vs No. 3 Charleston Southern	2−12		
3	7:00 pm	No. 4 Radford vs No. 6 Presbyterian	9−2	Presbyterian Eliminated	
Thursday, May 22
4	11:00 am	No. 5 Winthrop vs No. 1 USC Upstate	0−7		
5	3:00 pm	No. 3 Charleston Southern vs No. 2 High Point	14−15(10)		
6	7:00 pm	No. 5 Winthrop vs No. 4 Radford	13−4	Radford Eliminated	
Friday, May 23
7	11:00 am	No. 1 USC Upstate vs No. 2 High Point	13−9		
8	3:00 pm	No. 5 Winthrop vs No. 3 Charleston Southern	12–13(11)	Winthrop Eliminated	
9	7:00 pm	No. 3 Charleston Southern vs No. 2 High Point	18–8	High Point Eliminated	
Saturday, May 24
10	12:00 pm	No. 1 USC Upstate vs No. 3 Charleston Southern	14–2	USC Upstate wins championship	
*Game times in EDT. # – Rankings denote tournament seed.

== All–Tournament Team ==
Position	Player	Team
OF	Scott Campbell (MVP)	USC Upstate
OF	Henry Zenor	USC Upstate
OF	Jaylen Hernandez	Winthrop
OF	Lew Rice	Charleston Southern
C	Preston Lucas	USC Upstate
INF	Vance Sheahan	USC Upstate
INF	AJ Martin	Charleston Southern
INF	Chandler Tuupo	Charleston Southern
INF	Landen Johnson	High Point
DH	Kaden Smith	Charleston Southern
P	Amp Phillips	USC Upstate
P	Owen Sarna	Winthrop
UTL	Cooper Ellingworth	USC Upstate
