= Joe Raccuia =

American college baseball coach and former player

Biographical details
- Born: 1972 (age 52–53); Buffalo, New York, U.S.

Playing career
- 1992–1993: Edison CC
- 1994–1995: Radford

Coaching career (HC unless noted)
- 1996: Radford (asst)
- 1997–2000: George Washington (asst)
- 2001–2003: George Mason (asst)
- 2004–2005: Marist
- 2006–2007: Alabama (asst)
- 2008–2019: Radford

Head coaching record
- Overall: 406–380–1
- Tournaments: MAAC: 3–2; Big South: 19-20; NCAA: 2–4

Accomplishments and honors

Championships
- MAAC Tournament (2005); Big South Regular season (2015); 2× Big South Tournament (2015, 2017)

Awards
- Co-MAAC Coach of the Year (2005); Big South Coach of the Year (2015)

Joseph James Raccuia (born 1972) is an American college baseball coach and former player. Raccuia played college baseball at Edison Community College from 1992 to 1993 before transferring to Radford University where he played in 1994 and 1996. Raccuia was the head coach of Radford from 2008 to 2019.

== Early life ==
Raccuia enrolled at Edison Community College, where he played for the baseball team. In 1994, Raccuia accepted a scholarship to continue his playing career at Radford University.

As a junior at the Radford University in 1994, Raccuia had a .295 batting average, a .403 on-base percentage (OBP) and a .350 SLG.

As a senior in 1995, Raccuia batted .225 with a .316 SLG, 1 home run, and 18 RBIs.

== Coaching career ==
Upon graduation, Raccuia was named an assistant at Radford. From 1997 to 2000, he spent four seasons as an assistant for the George Washington Colonials baseball program. Raccuia then spent three seasons as an assistant for the George Mason Patriots baseball team.

=== Marist ===
On September 16, 2003, Raccuia left George Mason to become the head baseball coach for the Marist Red Foxes baseball program. In 2005, he led the Red Foxes to a 33–21 record, winning the Metro Atlantic Athletic Conference (MAAC) both regular season and tournament. He was named the Co-MAAC Coach of the Year along with Tony Rossi.

Raccuia left Marist after two seasons to become an assistant for the Alabama Crimson Tide baseball program.

=== Radford ===
On July 11, 2007, Raccuia was named the head coach at Radford. On August 15, 2019, Raccuia resigned from his position at head coach at Radford. Raccuia lead Radford to 348 wins and to the only two NCAA tournament appearances in the program's history.

== Head coaching record ==
Statistics overview
Season	Team	Overall	Conference	Standing	Postseason
Marist Red Foxes (Metro Atlantic Athletic Conference) (2004–2005)
2004	Marist	25–30	17–10	4th	MAAC tournament
2005	Marist	33–21	22–5	1st	NCAA Regional
Marist:		58–51	39–15		
Radford Highlanders (Big South Conference) (2008–2019)
2008	Radford	24–32	6–14		Big South tournament
2009	Radford	26–24	16–9	4th	Big South tournament
2010	Radford	29–26	15–11		Big South tournament
2011	Radford	31–25	14–13	6th	Big South tournament
2012	Radford	29–28–1	12–12	5th	Big South tournament
2013	Radford	30–26	14–10	3rd (North)	Big South tournament
2014	Radford	33–23	17–10	4th (North)	Big South tournament
2015	Radford	45–16	20–4	1st	NCAA Regional
2016	Radford	19–39	9–15	9th	Big South tournament
2017	Radford	27–32	11–13	5th	NCAA Regional
2018	Radford	25–32	14–13	6th	Big South tournament
2019	Radford	30–27	19–8	2nd	Big South tournament
Radford:		352–326–1	182–133		
Total:		406–380–1			
National champion Postseason invitational champion Conference regular season champion Conference regular season and conference tournament champion Division regular season champion Division regular season and conference tournament champion Conference tournament champion
