= 2010 Big South Conference baseball tournament =

- Teams: 8
- Format: Double-elimination
- Finals site: Winthrop Ballpark; Rock Hill, South Carolina
- Champions: Coastal Carolina (11th title)
- Winning coach: Gary Gilmore (8th title)
- MVP: Daniel Bowman (Coastal Carolina)

2010 Big South Conference baseball standings
	Conf.				Overall
Team	W		L	PCT	W		L	PCT
No. 11 Coastal Carolina ‍†‍‡‍^{y}	25	–	0	1.000	55	–	10	.846
Liberty ‍‍‍	19	–	8	.704	43	–	18	.705
Radford ‍‍‍	16	–	10	.615	34	–	24	.586
High Point ‍‍‍	1	–	26	.037	2	–	58	.033
Winthrop ‍‍‍	15	–	12	.556	29	–	28	.509
VMI ‍‍‍	14	–	13	.519	34	–	21	.618
UNC Asheville ‍‍‍	13	–	14	.481	20	–	32	.385
Gardner–Webb ‍‍‍	12	–	15	.444	27	–	28	.491
Presbyterian ‍‍‍	9	–	18	.333	17	–	37	.315
Charleston Southern ‍‍‍	9	–	17	.346	20	–	35	.364
† – Conference champion ‡ – Tournament champion y – Invited to the NCAA tournament High Point forfeited several games due to the use of an ineligible player. As of June 30, 2010; Rankings from Collegiate Baseball

The 2010 Big South Conference baseball tournament was the postseason baseball tournament for the Big South Conference, held from May 25 through 29 at Winthrop Ballpark, home field of Winthrop in Rock Hill, South Carolina. The top eight teams participated in the double-elimination tournament. The champion, Coastal Carolina, won the title for the eleventh time, and earned an invitation to the 2010 NCAA Division I baseball tournament.

== Format ==
The top eight finishers from the round-robin regular season qualified for the tournament. The teams were seeded one through eight based on conference winning percentage. The bottom seeds played a single elimination play-in round, with the two winners joining the top four seeds in a six team double-elimination tournament.

High Point forfeited several games due to the use of an ineligible player. The standings template at right reflects the results after the forfeits, while the table below shows the results of games played in order to accurately reflect seeding.

Team	W	L	Pct.	GB	Seed
Coastal Carolina	25	0	1.000	—	1
Liberty	19	8	.704	7	2
Radford	15	11	.577	10.5	3
High Point	15	12	.556	11	4
VMI	13	14	.481	13	5
Winthrop	13	14	.481	13	6
Gardner–Webb	10	17	.370	16	7
UNC Asheville	10	17	.370	16	8
Presbyterian	7	20	.259	19	—
Charleston Southern	6	20	.231	19.5	—

== Bracket and results ==
=== Play-in round ===
Team	R
7 Gardner–Webb	4
6 VMI	7

Team	R
8 UNC Asheville	3
5 Winthrop	4

=== Double-elimination rounds ===
First round
1	Coastal Carolina	11
6	VMI	2
3	Radford	8
4	High Point	10
2	Liberty	7
5	Winthrop	2

Second round
1	Coastal Carolina	11
3	Radford	9
4	High Point	2
2	Liberty	1
5	Winthrop	11
6	VMI	6

Third round
1	Coastal Carolina
4	High Point
2	Liberty	9
5	Winthrop	7

Semifinals
4	High Point	5
2	Liberty	9

Final
1	Coastal Carolina	8	—
2	Liberty	2	—

== All-Tournament Team ==
Name	School
Daniel Bowman	Coastal Carolina
Tyler Bream	Liberty
Chas Crane	Winthrop
Steven Evans	Liberty
Chance Gilmore	Coastal Carolina
Tommy La Stella	Coastal Carolina
Anthony Meo	Coastal Carolina
Mike Mercurio	High Point
Kenneth Negron	Liberty
Eddie Rohan	Winthrop
Pablo Rosario	High Point
Rich Witten	Coastal Carolina

=== Most Valuable Player ===
Daniel Bowman was named Tournament Most Valuable Player. Bowman was an outfielder for Coastal Carolina.
