= 2026 Big South Conference baseball tournament =

- Teams: 6
- Format: Double-elimination
- Finals site: HomeTrust Park; Asheville, North Carolina
- Champions: USC Upstate (2nd title)
- Winning coach: Kane Sweeney (2nd title)
- MVP: Wylie Waters (USC Upstate)
- Television: ESPN+

2026 Big South Conference baseball standings
	Conf.				Overall
Team	W		L	PCT	W		L	PCT
High Point ‍†‍‍	17	–	7	.708	36	–	18	.667
Winthrop ‍‍‍	15	–	9	.625	33	–	22	.600
USC Upstate ‍‍‡‍^{y}	13	–	11	.542	29	–	27	.518
Charleston Southern ‍‍‍	13	–	11	.542	29	–	21	.580
Radford ‍‍‍	12	–	12	.500	25	–	24	.510
Longwood ‍‍‍	11	–	13	.458	29	–	25	.537
Gardner–Webb ‍‍‍	10	–	14	.417	25	–	30	.455
UNC Asheville ‍‍‍	9	–	15	.375	21	–	34	.382
Presbyterian ‍‍‍	8	–	16	.333	12	–	44	.214
† – Conference champion ‡ – Tournament champion y – Invited to the NCAA Tournament; As of May 17, 2026; Rankings from D1Baseball

The 2026 Big South Conference baseball tournament will be held from May 20 through 23 at HomeTrust Park in Asheville, North Carolina. The top six regular season finishers of the conference's nine teams met in the double-elimination tournament. This was a change from the previous year in which only the top four teams qualified for the conference tournament.

== Seeding and format ==
The top six finishers of the league's nine teams will qualify for the double-elimination tournament. Teams will be seeded based on conference winning percentage, with the first tiebreaker being head-to-head record.

== Results ==
Upper round 1	Upper round 2	Upper final	Final
1	High Point	9
4	Charleston Southern	8	4	Charleston Southern	6
5	Radford	5	1	High Point	0
3	USC Upstate	5
2	Winthrop	6
3	USC Upstate	11	3	USC Upstate	18^{(7)}
6	Longwood	8
3	USC Upstate	1	8
6	Longwood	4	1
Lower round 1	Lower round 2	Lower round 3	Lower final
6	Longwood	7
2	Winthrop	3	1	High Point	4
6	Longwood	10	6	Longwood	4
5	Radford	7	4	Charleston Southern	4
6	Longwood	17

== Schedule ==
Game	Time*	Matchup^{#}	Score	Notes	Reference
Wednesday, May 20
1	11:00 am	No. 4 Charleston Southern vs No. 5 Radford	8–5		
2	3:00 pm	No. 3 USC Upstate vs No. 6 Longwood	11–8		
Thursday, May 21
3	9:00 am	No. 5 Radford vs No. 6 Longwood	7–17	Radford Eliminated	
5	3:00 pm	No. 2 Winthrop vs No. 3 USC Upstate	6–18 (7)		
Friday, May 22
4	9:00 am	No. 1 High Point vs No. 4 Charleston Southern	9–6	game suspended on 5/21 and resumed 5/22	
6	3:30 pm	No. 6 Longwood vs No. 4 Charleston Southern	10–4	Charleston Southern Eliminated	
Saturday, May 23
7	1:00 pm	No. 1 High Point vs No. 3 USC Upstate	–		
8	12:00 pm	No. 2 Winthrop vs No. 6 Longwood	–	Game location moved to Gardner-Webb; Elimination Game	
9	5:00 pm	Game 8 Winner vs Game 7 Loser	–	Elimination Game	
Sunday, May 24
10	12:00 pm	Game 7 Winner vs Game 9 Winner	–		
11	Following game 10	Game 7 Winner vs Game 9 Winner (if necessary)	–		
*Game times in EDT. # – Rankings denote tournament seed.

== All–Tournament Team ==
Position	Player	Team
