= 2007 Big South Conference baseball tournament =

- Teams: 8
- Format: Double-elimination
- Finals site: Winthrop Ballpark; Rock Hill, South Carolina
- Champions: Coastal Carolina (8th title)
- Winning coach: Gary Gilmore (5th title)
- MVP: Tommy Baldridge (Coastal Carolina)

2007 Big South Conference baseball standings
	Conf.				Overall
Team	W		L	PCT	W		L	PCT
No. 24 Coastal Carolina ‍†‍‡‍^{y}	17	–	4	.810	50	–	13	.794
Winthrop ‍‍‍	15	–	6	.714	33	–	27	.550
Liberty ‍‍‍	14	–	7	.667	36	–	25	.590
VMI ‍‍‍	10	–	11	.476	34	–	21	.618
High Point ‍‍‍	10	–	11	.476	27	–	30	.474
UNC Asheville ‍‍‍	9	–	12	.429	22	–	38	.367
Charleston Southern ‍‍‍	7	–	14	.333	22	–	34	.393
Radford ‍‍‍	2	–	19	.095	10	–	36	.217
† – Conference champion ‡ – Tournament champion y – Invited to the NCAA tournament As of June 30, 2007; Rankings from Collegiate Baseball

The 2007 Big South Conference baseball tournament was the postseason baseball tournament for the Big South Conference, held from May 22 through 26 at Winthrop Ballpark, home field of Winthrop in Rock Hill, South Carolina. All eight teams participated in the double-elimination tournament. The champion, Coastal Carolina, won the title for the eight time, and earned an invitation to the 2007 NCAA Division I baseball tournament.

== Format ==
All eight teams qualified for the tournament. The teams were seeded one through eight based on conference winning percentage. The bottom seeds played a single elimination play-in round, with the two winners joining the top four seeds in a six team double-elimination tournament.

Team	W	L	Pct.	GB	Seed
Coastal Carolina	17	4	.810	—	1
Winthrop	15	6	.714	2	2
Liberty	14	7	.667	3	3
VMI	10	11	.476	7	4
High Point	10	11	.476	7	5
UNC Asheville	9	12	.429	8	6
Charleston Southern	7	14	.333	10	7
Radford	2	19	.095	15	8

== Bracket and results ==
=== Play-in round ===
Team	R
8 Radford	3
5 High Point	8

Team	R
7 Charleston Southern	0
6 UNC Asheville	3

=== Double-elimination rounds ===
First round
1	Coastal Carolina	6
6	UNC Asheville	3
3	Liberty	4
4	VMI	3
2	Winthrop	6
5	High Point	5

Second round
1	Coastal Carolina	4
4	VMI	2
3	Liberty	1
2	Winthrop	4
6	UNC Asheville	9
5	High Point	7

Third round
1	Coastal Carolina	13
2	Winthrop	3
3	Liberty	12
6	UNC Asheville	8

Semifinals
2	Winthrop	0
3	Liberty	11

Final
1	Coastal Carolina	6	—
3	Liberty	5	—

== All-Tournament Team ==
Name	School
Tommy Baldridge	Coastal Carolina
Tyler Bortnick	Coastal Carolina
Phil Carey	Winthrop
Bobby Gagg	Coastal Carolina
Patrick Gaillard	Liberty
P.K. Keller	Liberty
Derek Martin	Coastal Carolina
Nick McCully	Coastal Carolina
Matt Rademacher	Coastal Carolina
Jonathan Settle	Winthrop
Michael Solbach	Liberty
Dustin Umberger	Liberty
Adam Vrable	Coastal Carolina
Garrett Young	Liberty

=== Most Valuable Player ===
Tommy Baldridge was named Tournament Most Valuable Player. Baldridge was an outfielder for Coastal Carolina.
