= 2009 Big South Conference baseball tournament =

- Teams: 8
- Format: Double-elimination
- Finals site: McCormick Field; Asheville, North Carolina
- Champions: Coastal Carolina (10th title)
- Winning coach: Gary Gilmore (7th title)
- MVP: David Anderson (Coastal Carolina)

2009 Big South Conference baseball standings
	Conf.				Overall
Team	W		L	PCT	W		L	PCT
No. 30 Coastal Carolina ‍†‍‡‍^{y}	21	–	5	.808	47	–	16	.746
Winthrop ‍‍‍	18	–	9	.667	35	–	25	.583
Liberty ‍‍‍	17	–	9	.654	33	–	21	.611
Radford ‍‍‍	16	–	9	.640	26	–	24	.520
Gardner–Webb ‍‍‍	13	–	14	.481	25	–	25	.500
High Point ‍‍‍	11	–	12	.478	21	–	32	.396
Charleston Southern ‍‍‍	10	–	15	.400	16	–	37	.302
VMI ‍‍‍	10	–	15	.400	18	–	35	.340
Presbyterian ‍‍‍	7	–	19	.269	13	–	38	.255
UNC Asheville ‍‍‍	5	–	21	.192	9	–	42	.176
† – Conference champion ‡ – Tournament champion y – Invited to the NCAA tournament As of June 30, 2009; Rankings from Collegiate Baseball

The 2009 Big South Conference baseball tournament was the postseason baseball tournament for the Big South Conference, held from May 19 through 23 at McCormick Field, home field of UNC Asheville in Asheville, North Carolina. The top eight teams participated in the double-elimination tournament. The champion, Coastal Carolina, won the title for the tenth time, and earned an invitation to the 2009 NCAA Division I baseball tournament.

== Format ==
The top eight finishers from the round-robin regular season qualified for the tournament. The teams were seeded one through eight based on conference winning percentage. The bottom seeds played a single elimination play-in round, with the two winners joining the top four seeds in a six team double-elimination tournament.

Team	W	L	Pct.	GB	Seed
Coastal Carolina	21	5	.808	—	1
Winthrop	18	9	.667	3.5	2
Liberty	17	9	.654	4	3
Radford	16	9	.640	4.5	4
Gardner–Webb	13	14	.481	8.5	5
High Point	11	12	.478	8.5	6
Charleston Southern	10	15	.400	10.5	7
VMI	10	15	.400	10.5	8
Presbyterian	7	19	.269	14	—
UNC Asheville	5	21	.192	16	—

== Bracket and results ==
=== Play-in round ===
Team	R
7 Charleston Southern	1
6 High Point	2

Team	R
8 VMI	13
5 Gardner–Webb	4

=== Double-elimination rounds ===
First round
1	Coastal Carolina	9
8	VMI	4
3	Liberty	10
4	Radford	3
2	Winthrop	4
6	High Point	7

Second round
1	Coastal Carolina	7
4	Radford	11
8	VMI	4
2	Winthrop	8
3	Liberty	20
6	High Point	10
1	Coastal Carolina	8
6	High Point	4

Third round
4	Radford	3
2	Winthrop	21
3	Liberty	0
1	Coastal Carolina	7

Semifinals
2	Winthrop	6
3	Liberty	1

Final
2	Winthrop	1
1	Coastal Carolina	7

== All-Tournament Team ==
Name	School
David Anderson	Coastal Carolina
Austin Fleet	Coastal Carolina
Alex Gregory	Radford
Bryn Henderson	Winthrop
Errol Hollinger	Liberty
P.J. Jimenez	Liberty
Robert Lake	Winthrop
Bill Manion	High Point
Nick McCully	Coastal Carolina
Rico Noel	Coastal Carolina
Eddie Rohan	Winthrop
Sean Sullivan	Winthrop
Eddie Tisdale	Winthrop
A.J. Yoder	VMI

=== Most Valuable Player ===
David Anderson was named Tournament Most Valuable Player. Anderson was a first baseman for Coastal Carolina.
