= 2005 Big South Conference baseball tournament =

- Teams: 6
- Format: Double-elimination
- Finals site: Charles Watson Stadium; Conway, South Carolina
- Champions: Winthrop (4th title)
- Winning coach: Joe Hudak (2nd title)
- MVP: Daniel Carte (Winthrop)

2005 Big South Conference baseball standings
	Conf.				Overall
Team	W		L	PCT	W		L	PCT
No. 25 Coastal Carolina ‍†‍‍^{y}	21	–	3	.875	50	–	16	.758
Winthrop ‍‍‡‍^{y}	19	–	5	.792	44	–	22	.667
Birmingham–Southern ‍‍‍	18	–	6	.750	36	–	21	.632
Liberty ‍‍‍	14	–	10	.583	36	–	19	.655
VMI ‍‍‍	11	–	13	.458	27	–	28	.491
Radford ‍‍‍	8	–	16	.333	15	–	40	.273
Charleston Southern ‍‍‍	8	–	16	.333	24	–	29	.453
High Point ‍‍‍	6	–	18	.250	19	–	36	.345
UNC Asheville ‍‍‍	3	–	21	.125	11	–	42	.208
† – Conference champion ‡ – Tournament champion y – Invited to the NCAA tournament As of June 30, 2005; Rankings from Collegiate Baseball

The 2005 Big South Conference baseball tournament was the postseason baseball tournament for the Big South Conference, held from May 25 through 28 at Charles Watson Stadium, home field of Coastal Carolina in Conway, South Carolina. The top six finishers participated in the double-elimination tournament. The champion, Winthrop, won the title for the fourth time, and earned an invitation to the 2005 NCAA Division I baseball tournament.

== Format ==
The top six finishers from the regular season qualified for the tournament. The teams were seeded one through six based on conference winning percentage and played a double-elimination tournament.

Team	W	L	Pct.	GB	Seed
Coastal Carolina	21	3	.875	—	1
Winthrop	19	5	.792	2	2
Birmingham–Southern	18	6	.750	3	3
Liberty	14	10	.583	7	4
VMI	11	13	.458	10	5
Radford	8	16	.333	13	6
Charleston Southern	8	16	.333	13	—
High Point	6	18	.250	15	—
UNC Asheville	3	21	.125	18	—

== Bracket and results ==
First round
1	Coastal Carolina	9
6	Radford	1
3	Birmingham–Southern	7
4	Liberty	8
2	Winthrop	11
5	VMI	1

Second round
1	Coastal Carolina	9
3	Birmingham–Southern	1
4	Liberty	2
2	Winthrop	7
6	Radford	8
5	VMI	7

Third round
1	Coastal Carolina	4
2	Winthrop	10
4	Liberty	10
6	Radford	4

Semifinals
1	Coastal Carolina	2
4	Liberty	1

Final
2	Winthrop	3	13
1	Coastal Carolina	4	7

== All-Tournament Team ==
Name	School
Daniel Carte	Winthrop
P.K. Keller	Liberty
Kellen Wohlford	Radford
Chris Carrara	Winthrop
Michael DeJesus	Coastal Carolina
Aaron Verrett	Coastal Carolina
Mike Costanzo	Coastal Carolina
Alan Robbins	Winthrop
Jeff Brown	Liberty
Jacob Dempsey	Winthrop
Ryan Page	Liberty
Heath Rollins	Winthrop
Ricky Shefka	Coastal Carolina
Mike Valter	Coastal Carolina

=== Most Valuable Player ===
Daniel Carte was named Tournament Most Valuable Player. Carter was an outfielder for Winthrop.
