= 2019 Big South Conference baseball tournament =

- Teams: 8
- Format: Double-elimination
- Finals site: Fayetteville Ballpark; Fayetteville, North Carolina
- Champions: Campbell (5th title)
- Winning coach: Justin Haire (2nd title)
- Television: ESPN3 (Tuesday-Wednesday); ESPN+ (Thursday-Friday); ESPNU (Championship)

2019 Big South Conference baseball standings
	Conf.				Overall
Team	W		L	PCT	W		L	PCT
Campbell ‍†‍‡‍^{y}	19	–	7	.731	37	–	21	.638
Radford ‍‍‍	19	–	8	.704	30	–	27	.526
Winthrop ‍‍‍	18	–	9	.667	34	–	23	.596
Presbyterian ‍‍‍	16	–	11	.593	30	–	29	.508
High Point ‍‍‍	14	–	13	.519	27	–	27	.500
Gardner–Webb ‍‍‍	14	–	13	.519	25	–	26	.490
Charleston Southern ‍‍‍	11	–	16	.407	23	–	36	.390
USC Upstate ‍‍‍	9	–	17	.346	23	–	30	.434
UNC Asheville ‍‍‍	9	–	18	.333	16	–	36	.308
Longwood ‍‍‍	5	–	22	.185	11	–	41	.212
† – Conference champion ‡ – Tournament champion y – Invited to the NCAA tournament As of June 4, 2019; Rankings from D1Baseball

The 2019 Big South Conference baseball tournament was held from May 21 through 25. The top eight regular season finishers of the conference's ten teams met in the double-elimination tournament held at Fayetteville Ballpark in Fayetteville, North Carolina. The tournament champion, Campbell, earned the conference's automatic bid to the 2019 NCAA Division I baseball tournament.

== Seeding and format ==
The top eight finishers of the league's ten teams qualified for the double-elimination tournament. Teams were seeded based on conference winning percentage, with the first tiebreaker being head-to-head record.

== Results ==
Play–in games
6	High Point	2
9	UNC Asheville	0
7	Charleston Southern	6
8	USC Upstate	1

Upper round 1	Upper round 2	Upper final	Final
1	Campbell	20
7	Charleston Southern	7
2	Radford	3^{13}
7	Charleston Southern	8
1	Campbell	13
3	Winthrop	5
4	Presbyterian	2
5	Gardner–Webb	1
4	Presbyterian	5
3	Winthrop	12
3	Winthrop	4
6	High Point	1
1	Campbell	8	–
3	Winthrop	6	–
Lower round 1	Lower round 2	Lower round 3	Lower final
4	Presbyterian	4
5	Gardner–Webb	2	6	High Point	15	6	High Point	2
6	High Point	6	6	High Point	6	3	Winthrop	6
2	Radford	4
2	Radford	8
7	Charleston Southern	1

== Conference championship ==
Big South Championship
(3) Winthrop Eagles	vs.	(1) Campbell Fighting Camels

May 25, 2019, 12:00 pm (EDT) at Segra Stadium in Fayetteville, North Carolina
Team	1	2	3	4	5	6	7	8	9	R	H	E
(3) Winthrop	1	0	0	1	2	1	0	0	1	6	6	1
(1) Campbell	0	0	0	1	3	0	3	1	X	8	14	3
WP: Phil Simpson (2–2) LP: Colten Rendon (3–3) Sv: Tyson Messer (5); Home runs: WIN: None; CAMP: Luis Gimenez; Tyler Anshaw; Matthew Barefoot
