= Craig Cozart =

American college baseball coach

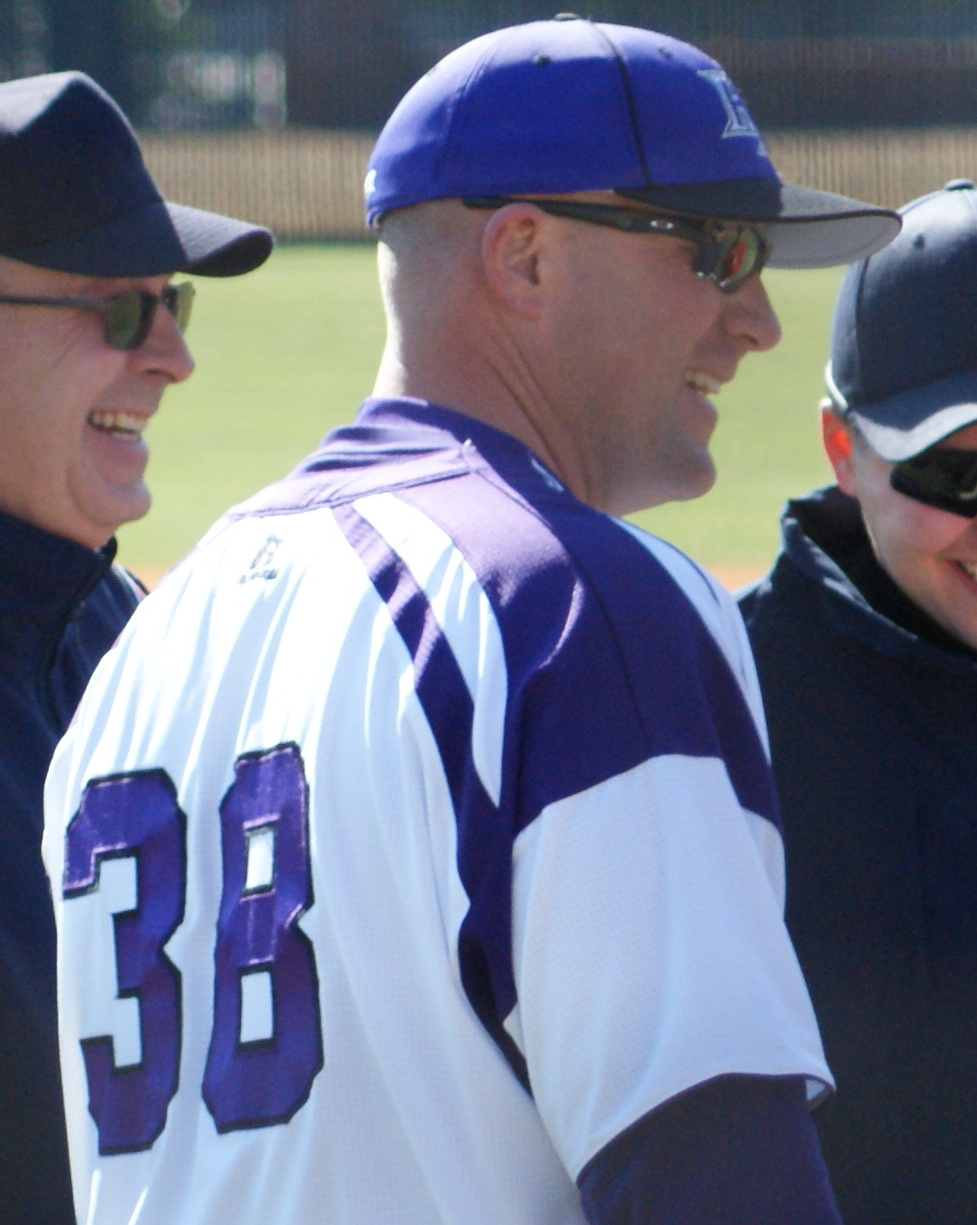
- Cozart before his first game as head coach at High Point

Biographical details
- Born: March 12, 1974 (age 52)
- Education: UCF '96 (B.A.)

Playing career
- 1993–1996: UCF

Coaching career (HC unless noted)
- 1997–2008: UCF (asst.)
- 2008: UCF (interim)
- 2009–2021: High Point

Head coaching record
- Overall: 343–345
- Tournaments: Big South: 14–15; C-USA: 0–2

Craig Cozart (born March 12, 1974) is an American baseball coach and former player. He played college baseball at UCF from 1993 to 1996. He then served as the head coach of the UCF Knights (2008) and High Point Panthers (2009–2021).

== Playing career ==
Cozart played at UCF under head coach Jay Bergman from 1993 to 1996. He was drafted twice, in the 42nd round by the Braves after his junior season and in the 28th round by the Giants after his senior season, but decided not to pursue a professional career. He earned his bachelor's degree from UCF in December 1996.

== Coaching career ==
=== UCF ===
Cozart began his coaching career under Bergman immediately after graduating, serving as a student assistant in 1997. In 1998, he became a full assistant coach, a position he held through the 2008 season. From 1997 to 2007, the Knights appeared in five NCAA Tournaments.

Partway through the 2008 season, Bergman resigned amid accusations of sexually harassing a UCF equipment manager. Cozart, by that point the associate head coach, served as the interim head coach for the final 12 games of the season. In that stretch, the team went 4–8, winning a C-USA series against UAB and going 0–2 in the C-USA Tournament.

UCF hired Terry Rooney to replace Bergman following the season. Cozart was told the following day that his contract would not be renewed. Cozart said to media members after he learned the news, "Really the last two months have been a difficult time because of everything that has been involved. But to get the word that 16 years of your life has ended – it's hard to handle still. ... I want to stay in the game. I'm just in the process of figuring out what capacity that will be."

=== High Point ===
Cozart became the head coach at High Point ahead of the 2009 season, after Sal Bando Jr. resigned. From 2009 to 2014, High Point has had two 30-win seasons. It has finished as high as third in the Big South Tournament, doing so in 2010, 2012, and 2014.

On June 2, 2021, High Point University announced that the university and Cozart had mutually agreed to, "a change in the leadership of the baseball program" effectively immediately.

== Head coaching record ==
Below is a table of Cozart's records as a collegiate head baseball coach.

Record table
Season	Team	Overall	Conference	Standing	Postseason
UCF Knights (Conference USA) (2008)
2008	UCF	4–8 (Note: Finished season as interim head coach.)	3–3		C-USA Tournament
UCF:		4–8	3–3		
High Point Panthers (Big South Conference) (2009–2021)
2009	High Point	21–32	11–12	6th	Big South Tournament
2010	High Point	31–29	15–12	4th	Big South Tournament
2011	High Point	24–32	9–18	T-8th	Big South Tournament
2012	High Point	28–31	11–13	T-7th	Big South Tournament
2013	High Point	29–29	15–9	2nd (North)	Big South Tournament
2014	High Point	33–22	18–9	3rd (North)	Big South Tournament
2015	High Point	29–26	14–10	5th	Big South Tournament
2016	High Point	32–24	14–10	T-2nd	Big South Tournament
2017	High Point	30–23	12–11	4th	Big South Tournament
2018	High Point	34–22	19–8	2nd	Big South Tournament
2019	High Point	27–27	14–13	T-5th	Big South Tournament
2020	High Point	7–9	0–0		Season canceled due to COVID-19
2021	High Point	14–31	12–25	9th	
High Point:		339–337	154–156		
Total:		343–345			
National champion Postseason invitational champion Conference regular season champion Conference regular season and conference tournament champion Division regular season champion Division regular season and conference tournament champion Conference tournament champion
