= 2002 Big South Conference baseball tournament =

College baseball tournament

- Teams: 8
- Format: Double-elimination
- Finals site: Winthrop Ballpark; Rock Hill, South Carolina
- Champions: Coastal Carolina (5th title)
- Winning coach: Gary Gilmore (2nd title)
- MVP: Adam Keim (Coastal Carolina)

2002 Big South Conference baseball standings
	Conf.						Overall
Team	W		L		T	PCT	W		L		T	PCT
Coastal Carolina ‍†‍‡‍^{y}	16	–	5	–	0	.762	44	–	19	–	0	.698
Elon ‍‍‍^{y}	13	–	8	–	0	.619	34	–	23	–	0	.596
Charleston Southern ‍‍‍	12	–	9	–	0	.571	25	–	34	–	0	.424
Liberty ‍‍‍	11	–	9	–	0	.550	33	–	24	–	2	.576
High Point ‍‍‍	9	–	11	–	0	.450	26	–	31	–	0	.456
Winthrop ‍‍‍	8	–	13	–	0	.381	29	–	30	–	0	.492
UNC Asheville ‍‍‍	7	–	14	–	0	.333	21	–	30	–	0	.412
Radford ‍‍‍	7	–	14	–	0	.333	18	–	33	–	0	.353
Birmingham–Southern ‍‍‍	0	–	0	–	0	–	32	–	20	–	0	.615
† – Conference champion ‡ – Tournament champion y – Invited to the NCAA tournament As of June 30, 2002; Rankings from Collegiate Baseball

The 2002 Big South Conference baseball tournament was the postseason baseball tournament for the Big South Conference, held from May 22 through 26 at Winthrop Ballpark, home field of Winthrop in Rock Hill, South Carolina. All eight eligible teams participated in the double-elimination tournament. The champion, Coastal Carolina, won the title for the fifth time, and second in a row, and earned an invitation to the 2002 NCAA Division I baseball tournament.

== Format ==
All teams qualified for the tournament. The teams were seeded one through eight based on conference winning percentage and played a double-elimination tournament. Birmingham–Southern was not eligible for championships as they completed their transition from NCAA Division II.

Team	W	L	Pct.	GB	Seed
Coastal Carolina	16	5	.762	—	1
Elon	13	8	.619	3	2
Charleston Southern	12	9	.571	4	3
Liberty	11	9	.550	4.5	4
High Point	9	11	.450	6.5	5
Winthrop	8	13	.381	8	6
UNC Asheville	7	14	.333	9	7
Radford	7	14	.333	9	8
Birmingham–Southern	0	0	—	—	—

== Bracket and results ==
Upper round 1	Upper round 2	Upper final	Final
1	Coastal Carolina	5
8	Radford	3
1	Coastal Carolina	14
5	High Point	2
4	Liberty	5
5	High Point	14
1	Coastal Carolina	4
6	Winthrop	3
3	Charleston Southern	1
6	Winthrop	4
6	Winthrop	9
2	Elon	5
2	Elon	10
7	UNC Asheville	5	1	Coastal Carolina	10	—
4	Liberty	1	—
Lower round 1	Lower round 2	Lower round 3	Lower final
2	Elon	3
8	Radford	1	4	Liberty	12	6	Winthrop	2
4	Liberty	4	4	Liberty	19	4	Liberty	8
3	Charleston Southern	6
5	High Point	1
3	Charleston Southern	7	3	Charleston Southern	2
7	UNC Asheville	2

== All-Tournament Team ==
Name	School
Keith Butler	Liberty
John Cavanaugh	High Point
Seamus Donovan	Coastal Carolina
Matt Hagen	Liberty
Adam Keim	Coastal Carolina
Marcus Maringola	Liberty
Randy McGarvey Jr.	Coastal Carolina
Ryan McGraw	Coastal Carolina
Brandon Powell	Coastal Carolina
Grant Rembert	UNC Asheville
Bennett Stapf	Winthrop
Ben Thurmond	Winthrop

=== Most Valuable Player ===
Adam Keim was named Tournament Most Valuable Player. Keim was a shortstop for Coastal Carolina.
