= 2008 Big South Conference baseball tournament =

- Teams: 8
- Format: Double-elimination
- Finals site: Dan Daniel Memorial Park; Danville, Virginia
- Champions: Coastal Carolina (9th title)
- Winning coach: Gary Gilmore (6th title)
- MVP: Tyler Bortnick (Coastal Carolina)

2008 Big South Conference baseball standings
	Conf.						Overall
Team	W		L		T	PCT	W		L		T	PCT
No. 16 Coastal Carolina ‍†‍‡‍^{y}	17	–	3	–	0	.850	50	–	14	–	0	.781
Liberty ‍‍‍	14	–	7	–	0	.667	35	–	26	–	1	.573
VMI ‍‍‍	14	–	7	–	0	.667	29	–	26	–	0	.527
Winthrop ‍‍‍	12	–	9	–	0	.571	27	–	33	–	0	.450
High Point ‍‍‍	3	–	18	–	0	.143	12	–	41	–	0	.226
Radford ‍‍‍	8	–	12	–	0	.400	26	–	30	–	0	.464
Charleston Southern ‍‍‍	7	–	14	–	0	.333	19	–	34	–	0	.358
UNC Asheville ‍‍‍	8	–	13	–	0	.381	26	–	33	–	0	.441
† – Conference champion ‡ – Tournament champion y – Invited to the NCAA tournament High Point forfeited several games due to the use of an ineligible player. As of June 30, 2008; Rankings from Collegiate Baseball

The 2008 Big South Conference baseball tournament was the postseason baseball tournament for the Big South Conference, held from May 20 through 24 at Dan Daniel Memorial Park in Danville, Virginia. All eight teams participated in the double-elimination tournament. The champion, Coastal Carolina, won the title for the ninth time, and earned an invitation to the 2008 NCAA Division I baseball tournament.

== Format ==
All eight teams qualified for the tournament. The teams were seeded one through eight based on conference winning percentage. The bottom seeds played a single elimination play-in round, with the two winners joining the top four seeds in a six team double-elimination tournament.

High Point forfeited several games due to the use of an ineligible player. The standings template at right reflects the results after the forfeits, while the table below shows the results of games played in order to accurately reflect seeding.

Team	W	L	Pct.	GB	Seed
Coastal Carolina	17	3	.850	—	1
Liberty	14	7	.667	3.5	2
VMI	14	7	.667	4.5	3
Winthrop	11	10	.571	6.5	4
High Point	9	12	.429	8.5	5
Radford	6	14	.300	11	6
Charleston Southern	6	15	.286	11.5	7
UNC Asheville	6	15	.286	11.5	8

== Bracket and results ==
=== Play-in round ===
Team	R
7 Charleston Southern	1
6 Radford	6

Team	R
8 UNC Asheville	3
5 High Point	2

=== Double-elimination rounds ===
First round
1	Coastal Carolina	20
8	UNC Asheville	4
3	VMI	2
4	Winthrop	7
2	Liberty	4
6	Radford	15

Second round
1	Coastal Carolina	3
3	VMI	1
4	Winthrop	13
6	Radford	9
8	UNC Asheville	1
2	Liberty	10

Third round
1	Coastal Carolina	8
4	Winthrop	6
6	Radford	2
2	Liberty	11

Semifinals
4	Winthrop	3
2	Liberty	15

Final
1	Coastal Carolina	1	9
2	Liberty	13	2

== All-Tournament Team ==
Name	School
Tommy Baldridge	Coastal Carolina
Tyler Bortnick	Coastal Carolina
Cody Brown	Liberty
Dock Doyle	Coastal Carolina
Steven Evans	Liberty
Alex Gregory	Radford
Joey Haug	Coastal Carolina
Bryn Henderson	Winthrop
Jeff Jefferson	Liberty
Reggie Keen	Radford
Ryan Mullins	Winthrop
John Murrian	Winthrop
David Sappelt	Coastal Carolina
Dustin Umberger	Liberty
Garrett Young	Liberty

=== Most Valuable Player ===
Tyler Bortnick was named Tournament Most Valuable Player. Bortnick was a shortstop for Coastal Carolina.
