= 2003 Big South Conference baseball tournament =

- Teams: 6
- Format: Double-elimination
- Finals site: Winthrop Ballpark; Rock Hill, South Carolina
- Champions: Coastal Carolina (6th title)
- Winning coach: Gary Gilmore (3rd title)
- MVP: Steven Carter (Coastal Carolina)

2003 Big South Conference baseball standings
	Conf.						Overall
Team	W		L		T	PCT	W		L		T	PCT
Winthrop ‍†‍‍	15	–	4	–	0	.789	35	–	22	–	0	.614
Coastal Carolina ‍‍‡‍^{y}	12	–	7	–	0	.632	45	–	18	–	0	.714
Elon ‍‍‍	12	–	7	–	0	.632	34	–	23	–	2	.593
UNC Asheville ‍‍‍	12	–	9	–	0	.571	27	–	28	–	0	.491
Charleston Southern ‍‍‍	9	–	12	–	0	.429	19	–	37	–	0	.339
Liberty ‍‍‍	7	–	12	–	0	.368	17	–	37	–	0	.315
High Point ‍‍‍	5	–	12	–	0	.294	14	–	37	–	0	.275
Radford ‍‍‍	5	–	14	–	0	.263	13	–	28	–	0	.317
Birmingham–Southern ‍‍‍	0	–	0	–	0	–	33	–	18	–	0	.647
† – Conference champion ‡ – Tournament champion y – Invited to the NCAA tournament As of June 30, 2003; Rankings from Collegiate Baseball

The 2003 Big South Conference baseball tournament was the postseason baseball tournament for the Big South Conference, held from May 21 through 25 at Winthrop Ballpark, home field of Winthrop in Rock Hill, South Carolina. The top six finishers participated in the double-elimination tournament. The champion, Coastal Carolina, won the title for the sixth time, and third in a row, and earned an invitation to the 2003 NCAA Division I baseball tournament.

== Format ==
The top six finishers from the regular season qualified for the tournament. The teams were seeded one through six based on conference winning percentage and played a double-elimination tournament. Birmingham–Southern was not eligible for championships as they completed their transition from NCAA Division II.

Team	W	L	Pct.	GB	Seed
Winthrop	15	4	.789	—	1
Coastal Carolina	12	7	.632	3	2
Elon	12	7	.632	3	3
UNC Asheville	12	9	.571	4	4
Charleston Southern	9	12	.429	7	5
Liberty	7	12	.368	8	6
High Point	5	12	.294	9	—
Radford	5	14	.263	10	—
Birmingham–Southern	0	0	—	—	—

== Bracket and results ==
First round
1	Winthrop	2
6	Liberty	1
3	Elon	9
4	UNC Asheville	4
2	Coastal Carolina	7
5	Charleston Southern	2

Second round
1	Winthrop	1
4	UNC Asheville	9
6	Liberty	8
5	Charleston Southern	2
3	Elon	4
2	Coastal Carolina	7
3	Elon	8
1	Winthrop	1

Third round
4	UNC Asheville	4
6	Liberty	5
2	Coastal Carolina	10
3	Elon	1

Final
6	Liberty	4	0
2	Coastal Carolina	1	10

== All-Tournament Team ==
Name	School
Chad Bryan	Liberty
Steven Carter	Coastal Carolina
Erich Cloninger	Liberty
Matt Garner	Elon
Phillip Laurent	Liberty
Ryan McGraw	Coastal Carolina
Holt Montgomery	Elon
Chris Price	Elon
Daniel Pruitt	UNC Asheville
Robert Rudder	UNC Asheville
Robbie Smith	Elon

=== Most Valuable Player ===
Steven Carter was named Tournament Most Valuable Player. Carter was a pitcher for Coastal Carolina, and won the award for the first of two consecutive years. Through 2020, Carter is the only player to earn the award twice.
