= 2004 Big South Conference baseball tournament =

- Teams: 6
- Format: Double-elimination
- Finals site: Winthrop Ballpark; Rock Hill, South Carolina
- Champions: Coastal Carolina (7th title)
- Winning coach: Gary Gilmore (4th title)
- MVP: Steven Carter (Coastal Carolina)

2004 Big South Conference baseball standings
	Conf.				Overall
Team	W		L	PCT	W		L	PCT
Birmingham–Southern ‍†‍‍^{y}	21	–	3	.875	47	–	18	.723
Winthrop ‍‍‍	16	–	8	.667	37	–	23	.617
Coastal Carolina ‍‍‡‍^{y}	16	–	8	.667	40	–	23	.635
Radford ‍‍‍	14	–	10	.583	23	–	30	.434
UNC Asheville ‍‍‍	13	–	11	.542	26	–	31	.456
Charleston Southern ‍‍‍	11	–	13	.458	24	–	34	.414
Liberty ‍‍‍	9	–	15	.375	25	–	30	.455
VMI ‍‍‍	4	–	20	.167	23	–	32	.418
High Point ‍‍‍	4	–	20	.167	11	–	44	.200
† – Conference champion ‡ – Tournament champion y – Invited to the NCAA tournament As of June 30, 2004; Rankings from Collegiate Baseball

The 2004 Big South Conference baseball tournament was the postseason baseball tournament for the Big South Conference, held from May 26 through 29 at Winthrop Ballpark, home field of Winthrop in Rock Hill, South Carolina. The top six finishers participated in the double-elimination tournament. The champion, Coastal Carolina, won the title for the seventh time, and fourth in a row, and earned an invitation to the 2004 NCAA Division I baseball tournament.

== Format ==
The top six finishers from the regular season qualified for the tournament. The teams were seeded one through six based on conference winning percentage and played a double-elimination tournament.

Team	W	L	Pct.	GB	Seed
Birmingham–Southern	21	3	.875	—	1
Winthrop	16	8	.667	5	2
Coastal Carolina	16	8	.667	5	3
Radford	14	10	.583	7	4
UNC Asheville	13	11	.542	8	5
Charleston Southern	11	13	.458	10	6
Liberty	9	15	.375	12	—
VMI	4	20	.167	17	—
High Point	4	20	.167	17	—

== Bracket and results ==
First round
1	Birmingham–Southern	2^{12}
6	Charleston Southern	1
3	Coastal Carolina	8
4	Radford	2
2	Winthrop	2
5	UNC Asheville	1

Second round
1	Birmingham–Southern	2
4	Radford	1
3	Coastal Carolina	8
2	Winthrop	4
5	UNC Asheville	9
6	Charleston Southern	2

Third round
1	Birmingham–Southern	3
3	Coastal Carolina	5
2	Winthrop	8
5	UNC Asheville	1

Semifinals
1	Birmingham–Southern	9
2	Winthrop	7

Final
3	Coastal Carolina	2	7
1	Birmingham–Southern	9	5

== All-Tournament Team ==
Name	School
Matt Barber	Birmingham-Southern
Daniel Carte	Winthrop
Steven Carter	Coastal Carolina
Mike Costanzo	Coastal Carolina
Brett Grandstrand	Coastal Carolina
Wes Letson	Birmingham-Southern
Grant Neidenfeuhr	Winthrop
Chad Oxendine	Coastal Carolina
Chris Raber	Coastal Carolina
Connor Robertson	Birmingham-Southern
Chris Todd	Coastal Carolina
Jared Walker	Birmingham-Southern

=== Most Valuable Player ===
Steven Carter was named Tournament Most Valuable Player. Carter was a pitcher for Coastal Carolina, and won the award for the second of two consecutive years. Through 2020, Carter is the only player to earn the award twice.
