= 2012 Big South Conference baseball tournament =

- Teams: 8
- Format: Double-elimination
- Finals site: George S. Erath Field at Coy O. Williard Baseball Stadium; High Point, NC
- Champions: Coastal Carolina (13th title)
- Winning coach: Gary Gilmore (10th title)
- MVP: Aaron Burke/Ryan Connolly (Coastal Carolina)

2012 Big South Conference baseball standings
	Conf.						Overall
Team	W		L		T	PCT	W		L		T	PCT
Coastal Carolina ‍†‍‡‍^{y}	18	–	5	–	0	.783	38	–	17	–	0	.691
Campbell ‍‍‍	15	–	9	–	0	.625	40	–	16	–	0	.714
Liberty ‍‍‍	14	–	10	–	0	.583	39	–	18	–	0	.684
Gardner–Webb ‍‍‍	12	–	12	–	0	.500	30	–	27	–	0	.526
Radford ‍‍‍	12	–	12	–	0	.500	29	–	26	–	1	.527
UNC Asheville ‍‍‍	12	–	12	–	0	.500	25	–	29	–	0	.463
High Point ‍‍‍	11	–	13	–	0	.458	26	–	29	–	0	.473
Charleston Southern ‍‍‍	11	–	13	–	0	.458	20	–	35	–	0	.364
Presbyterian ‍‍‍	10	–	14	–	0	.417	24	–	31	–	0	.436
Winthrop ‍‍‍	9	–	14	–	0	.391	17	–	35	–	0	.327
VMI ‍‍‍	7	–	17	–	0	.292	16	–	36	–	0	.308
† – Conference champion ‡ – Tournament champion y – Invited to the NCAA Division I Baseball Championship; As of May 22, 2012; Rankings from Coaches' Poll

The 2012 Big South Conference baseball tournament was held from May 22 through 26. The top eight regular season finishers of the ten eligible teams met in the double-elimination tournament. This tournament was held at George S. Erath Field at Coy O. Williard Baseball Stadium on the campus of High Point University, Located in High Point, NC. Presbyterian was not eligible for postseason play in any sport until the 2012–2013 academic year due to its transition to Division I. Top seeded Coastal Carolina won their thirteenth championship and earned the conference's automatic bid to the 2012 NCAA Division I baseball tournament.

== Seeding ==
The top eight finishers from the regular season will be seeded one through eight.

Team	W	L	Pct.	GB	Seed
Coastal Carolina	18	5	.783	–	1
Campbell	15	9	.625	3.5	2
Liberty	14	10	.583	4.5	3
Gardner–Webb	12	12	.500	6.5	4
Radford	12	12	.500	6.5	5
UNC Asheville	12	12	.500	6.5	6
High Point	11	13	.458	7.5	7
Charleston Southern	11	13	.458	7.5	8
Presbyterian	10	14	.417	8.5	–
Winthrop	9	14	.391	9.5	–
VMI	7	17	.292	11.5	–

== Results ==
First round
5	Radford	8
4	Gardner–Webb	2
8	Charleston Southern	8
1	Coastal Carolina	9
4	Gardner–Webb	4
8	Charleston Southern	3
6	UNC Asheville	2
3	Liberty	9
7	High Point	4
2	Campbell	10
7	High Point	7
6	UNC Asheville	1

Second round
1	Coastal Carolina	5
5	Radford	3
5	Radford	0
4	Gardner–Webb	11
3	Liberty	7
2	Campbell	0
2	Campbell	2
7	High Point	9

Semifinals
7	High Point	3
1	Coastal Carolina	4
4	Gardner Webb	3
3	Liberty	4

Final
3	Liberty	1
1	Coastal Carolina	4

== All-Tournament Team ==
The following players were named to the All-Tournament Team.

POS	Player	Team
P	Aaron Burke	Coastal Carolina
P	Ryan Connolly	Coastal Carolina
P	Patrick Eckelbarger	Liberty
P	Beau Hilton	Gardner-Webb
DH	Alex Buccilli	Coastal Carolina
OF	Daniel Bowman	Coastal Carolina
OF	Devin Bujnovsky	High Point
OF	Benji Jackson	Gardner-Webb
INF	Rich Witten	Coastal Carolina
INF	Alex Close	Liberty
INF	Ryan Retz	High Point
INF	Dusty Quattlebaum	Gardner-Webb
C	Trey Wimmer	Liberty
UTL	Spencer Angelis	High Point

=== Most Valuable Player ===
Aaron Burke and Ryan Connolly were named co-Most Valuable Players. Burke and Connolly were both pitchers for Coastal Carolina.
