= 2011 Big South Conference baseball tournament =

- Teams: 8
- Format: Double-elimination
- Finals site: Gray–Minor Stadium; Lexington, VA
- Champions: Coastal Carolina (12th title)
- Winning coach: Gary Gilmore (9th title)
- MVP: Keith Hardwick (Coastal Carolina)

2011 Big South Conference baseball standings
	Conf.						Overall
Team	W		L		T	PCT	W		L		T	PCT
Coastal Carolina ‍†‍‡‍^{y}	20	–	7	–	0	.741	42	–	20	–	0	.677
Liberty ‍‍‍	18	–	9	–	0	.667	35	–	24	–	0	.593
Charleston Southern ‍‍‍	15	–	9	–	0	.625	29	–	30	–	0	.492
Winthrop ‍‍‍	15	–	12	–	0	.556	27	–	30	–	0	.474
Gardner–Webb ‍‍‍	13	–	14	–	0	.481	34	–	23	–	1	.595
Radford ‍‍‍	14	–	13	–	0	.519	31	–	25	–	0	.554
VMI ‍‍‍	14	–	13	–	0	.519	27	–	24	–	1	.529
Presbyterian ‍‍‍	9	–	18	–	0	.333	24	–	32	–	0	.429
High Point ‍‍‍	9	–	18	–	0	.333	24	–	32	–	0	.429
UNC Asheville ‍‍‍	7	–	20	–	0	.259	15	–	37	–	0	.288
† – Conference champion ‡ – Tournament champion y – Invited to the NCAA Division I Baseball Championship; As of May 28, 2011; Rankings from Coaches' Poll

The 2011 Big South Conference baseball tournament was the postseason baseball tournament for the Big South Conference, held from May 24 through 28, 2011, at Gray–Minor Stadium on the campus of the Virginia Military Institute. The top eight regular season finishers of the ten eligible teams met in the double-elimination tournament. Presbyterian was not eligible for postseason play in any sport until the 2012–2013 academic year due to its transition to Division I. Top seeded Coastal Carolina won their twelfth championship and earned the conference's automatic bid to the 2011 NCAA Division I baseball tournament.

== Seeding ==
The top eight finishers from the regular season were seeded one through eight.

Team	W	L	Pct.	GB	Seed
Coastal Carolina	20	7	.741	–	1
Liberty	18	9	.667	2	2
Charleston Southern	15	12	.556	5	3
Winthrop	15	12	.556	5	4
Gardner–Webb	14	13	.519	6	5
Radford	14	13	.519	6	6
VMI	14	13	.519	6	7
Presbyterian	9	18	.333	11	–
High Point	9	18	.333	11	8
UNC Asheville	7	20	.259	13	–

== Bracket ==
=== Play-in Round ===
May 24, 2011 7:15 PM (EST) at Gray–Minor Stadium in Lexington, VA
Team	1	2	3	4	5	6	7	8	9	R	H	E
#8 High Point	3	0	1	0	0	0	0	0	0	4	9	4
#5 Gardner–Webb	2	4	5	0	3	0	0	0	x	14	16	1
WP: E. Pagan (4–3) LP: M. Caldwell (5–3); Attendance: 499; Boxscore

May 24 4:07 PM (EST) at Gray–Minor Stadium in Lexington, VA
Team	1	2	3	4	5	6	7	8	9	R	H	E
#7 VMI	0	0	0	0	0	0	0	0	1	1	6	0
#6 Radford	1	0	0	1	1	0	0	0	x	3	12	0
WP: E. Butler (9–2) LP: J. Farley (4–8) Sv: A. Williams (17); Attendance: 579; Boxscore

=== Double-Elimination ===
First round May 25
1	Coastal Carolina	5
6	Radford	0
2	Liberty	13
5	Gardner–Webb	5
3	Charl. Southern	9
4	Winthrop	3

Second round May 26
1	Coastal Carolina	10
4	Winthrop	6
2	Liberty	6
3	Charl. Southern	1
5	Gardner–Webb	11
6	Radford	5

Third round May 27
1	Coastal Carolina	3
2	Liberty	2
3	Charleston Southern	0
5	Gardner–Webb	5

Semifinals; May 27
2	Liberty	1
5	Gardner–Webb	5

Championship; May 28
1	Coastal Carolina	6
5	Gardner–Webb	1

== All-Tournament Team ==
The following players were named to the All-Tournament Team:

POS	Player	Team
P	Anthony Meo	Coastal Carolina
P	Brett Stackhouse	Gardner–Webb
P	Keegan Linza	Liberty
P	Stew Brase	Charleston Southern
P	Eddie Butler	Radford
DH	Keith Hardwick	Coastal Carolina
OF	Jake Watts	Gardner–Webb
OF	Adam McFarland	Gardner–Webb
OF	Daniel Bowman	Coastal Carolina
INF	Rich Witten	Coastal Carolina
INF	Taylor Motter	Coastal Carolina
INF	Aaron Miller	Gardner–Webb
INF	Walt Quattlebaum	Charleston Southern
C	Casey Rasmus	Liberty
UTL	Hayes Orton	Coastal Carolina

=== Most Valuable Player ===
Coastal Carolina designated hitter Keith Hardwick was awarded MVP honors with a .429 batting average and 4 RBI in the tournament.
