= 2006 Big South Conference baseball tournament =

- Teams: 6
- Format: Double-elimination
- Finals site: Charles Watson Stadium; Conway, South Carolina
- Champions: UNC Asheville (1st title)
- Winning coach: Willie Stewart (1st title)
- MVP: Rob Vernon (UNC Asheville)

2006 Big South Conference baseball standings
	Conf.				Overall
Team	W		L	PCT	W		L	PCT
Birmingham–Southern ‍†‍‍	18	–	6	.750	33	–	22	.600
Winthrop ‍‍‍^{y}	17	–	7	.708	46	–	18	.719
Coastal Carolina ‍‍‍	15	–	9	.625	30	–	27	.526
High Point ‍‍‍	14	–	10	.583	27	–	32	.458
Liberty ‍‍‍	13	–	11	.542	39	–	21	.650
UNC Asheville ‍‍‡‍^{y}	10	–	14	.417	28	–	35	.444
VMI ‍‍‍	9	–	15	.375	30	–	25	.545
Charleston Southern ‍‍‍	8	–	16	.333	18	–	38	.321
Radford ‍‍‍	4	–	20	.167	7	–	41	.146
† – Conference champion ‡ – Tournament champion y – Invited to the NCAA tournament As of June 30, 2006; Rankings from Collegiate Baseball

The 2006 Big South Conference baseball tournament was the postseason baseball tournament for the Big South Conference, held from May 24 through 27 at Charles Watson Stadium, home field of Coastal Carolina in Conway, South Carolina. The top six finishers participated in the double-elimination tournament. The champion, UNC Asheville, won the title for the first time, and earned an invitation to the 2006 NCAA Division I baseball tournament.

== Format ==
The top six finishers from the regular season qualified for the tournament. The teams were seeded one through six based on conference winning percentage and played a double-elimination tournament.

Team	W	L	Pct.	GB	Seed
Birmingham–Southern	18	6	.750	—	1
Winthrop	17	7	.708	1	2
Coastal Carolina	15	9	.625	3	3
High Point	14	10	.583	4	4
Liberty	13	11	.542	5	5
UNC Asheville	10	14	.417	8	6
VMI	9	15	.375	9	—
Charleston Southern	8	16	.333	10	—
Radford	4	20	.167	14	—

== Bracket and results ==
First round
1	Birmingham–Southern	0
6	UNC Asheville	2
3	Coastal Carolina	0
4	High Point	1
2	Winthrop	6
5	Liberty	9

Second round
6	UNC Asheville	1
3	Coastal Carolina	6
1	Birmingham–Southern	3
2	Winthrop	4
4	High Point	7
5	Liberty	9
6	UNC Asheville	12
4	High Point	2

Third round
3	Coastal Carolina	3
2	Winthrop	4^{10}
5	Liberty	1
6	UNC Asheville	4

Semifinals
2	Winthrop	7
5	Liberty	11

Final
5	Liberty	1
6	UNC Asheville	16

== All-Tournament Team ==
Name	School
Rob Vernon	UNC Asheville
Phillip Laurent	Liberty
Elliott Arrington	UNC Asheville
Aaron Grijalva	Liberty
Jeff Cowan	High Point
Matt Repec	Winthrop
Matt Henson	UNC Asheville
Billy Alvino	High Point
Brant Peacher	Coastal Carolina
Phil Carey	Winthrop
Alan DeRatt	UNC Asheville
Phillip Thompson	Liberty

=== Most Valuable Player ===
Rob Vernon was named Tournament Most Valuable Player. Vernon was an outfielder for UNC Asheville.
