= Matt Myers (baseball) =

American baseball coach (born 1974)

- Pitching coach
- Born: November 15, 1974 (age 51); Carmichael, California, U.S.
- Bats: Left Throws: Left

Teams
- As player: Sacramento State (1994); Sacramento City (1995); Tennessee (1996–1997); As coach: Greensboro Grasshoppers (2024–present) (Pitching)
Coaching career
Coaching career (HC unless noted)
1999	Tennessee (Asst.)
2000	UNC Asheville (Asst.)
2001–2004	UNC Asheville
2005–2007	Auburn (Asst.)
2008–2011	Western Kentucky (Asst.)
2012–2015	Western Kentucky
2018–2021	UNC Wilmington (Asst.)
2022–2023	Lipscomb (Pitching)
Head coaching record
Overall	195–246 (.442)

Matt Myers (born November 15, 1974) is an American baseball coach and former pitcher who is the current pitching coach for the Greensboro Grasshoppers, the High-A affiliate of the Pittsburgh Pirates. He served as the head coach of UNC Asheville Bulldogs (2001–2004) and Western Kentucky (2012–2015). He also served as pitching coach at UNC Wilmington, with his most recent collegiate coaching job being the pitching coach at Lipscomb.

== Playing career ==
Myers played one season each at Sacramento State and Sacramento City before completing his college career at Tennessee. His 13–4 record gives him one of the top 10 winning percentages in Volunteer history.

== Coaching career ==
After completing his degree in 1998, Myers served as a graduate assistant at Tennessee for the 1999 season. He also completed a master's degree in that year. He then earned a position as a full-time assistant coach at UNC Asheville for the 2000 season, and was elevated to head coach the following year. He helped rebuild a struggling program, leading the Bulldogs to the top half of the Big South Conference as one of the youngest coaches in Division I. He earned Big South Conference Coach of the Year honors in 2003 and a 4th-place finish. He then moved to Auburn as an assistant for three seasons. His pitching staff ranked among the program's best in his three years in ERA and also recorded strong results in saves and walks. In June 2007, Myers moved to WKU, and added associate head coach duties two years later. He was named head coach prior to the 2012 season. In four seasons, Myers's teams failed to reach the 30-win mark or finish better than 16-14 in conference play, and he was fired at the end of the 2015 season. After a three-season stint as head coach at Bowling Green High School in Bowling Green, Kentucky, Myers was hired as an assistant at UNC Wilmington following the 2018 season. In January 2022, Lipscomb University announced the hiring of Myers as their pitching coach. In January 2024, it was announced that Myers was hired as the pitching coach for the Greensboro Grasshoppers, the High-A affiliate of the Pittsburgh Pirates.

== Head coaching record ==
The following table shows Myers' record as a head coach.

Statistics overview
Season	Team	Overall	Conference	Standing	Postseason
UNC Asheville Bulldogs (Big South Conference) (2001–2004)
2001	UNC Asheville	15–39	8–12	5th (7)	Big South Tournament (Note: The top six finishers of the Big South's seven teams qualified for the tournament in 2001.)
2002	UNC Asheville	21–30	7–14	7th (8)	Big South Tournament (Note: All of the Big South's eight eligible teams qualified for the tournament in 2002.)
2003	UNC Asheville	27–28	12–9	4th (8)	Big South Tournament (Note: The top six finishers of the Big South's eight eligible teams qualified for the tournament in 2003.)
2004	UNC Asheville	26–31	13–11	5th (9)	Big South Tournament (Note: The top six finishers of the Big South's nine teams qualified for the tournament in 2004.)
UNC Asheville:		89–128 (.410)	40–46 (.465)		
Western Kentucky Hilltoppers (Sun Belt Conference) (2012–2014)
2012	Western Kentucky	25–33	13–17	8th	Sun Belt Tournament (Note: The top 8 finishers of the Sun Belt's 10 teams qualified for the tournament in 2012)
2013	Western Kentucky	28–29	16–14	5th	Sun Belt Tournament
2014	Western Kentucky	29–28	15–15	5th	Sun Belt Tournament
Western Kentucky Hilltoppers (Conference USA) (2015)
2015	Western Kentucky	24–28	10–19	11th	
Western Kentucky:		106–118 (.473)	54–65 (.454)		
Total:		195–246 (.442)			
National champion Postseason invitational champion Conference regular season champion Conference regular season and conference tournament champion Division regular season champion Division regular season and conference tournament champion Conference tournament champion
