= Stuart Lake (baseball) =

American college baseball coach (born 1971)

Current position
- Title: Coordinator of Baseball Administration / Director of Player Development
- Team: South Carolina
- Conference: SEC

Biographical details
- Born: August 29, 1971 (age 55); Prosperity, South Carolina, U.S.
- Education: Charleston Southern University '94 (B.S.); University of South Carolina '98 (M.A.)

Coaching career (HC unless noted)
- 1999–2002: South Carolina (asst.)
- 2003: College of Charleston (asst.)
- 2004–2006: Ole Miss (asst.)
- 2007–2008: The Citadel (asst.)
- 2009–2016: Charleston Southern
- 2020–Present: South Carolina (asst.)

Administrative career (AD unless noted)
- 2017–2019: South Carolina (CBA/DPD)

Head coaching record
- Overall: 179–262
- Tournaments: Big South: 1–11

Accomplishments and honors

Awards
- Big South Coach of the Year: 2011

Stuart Daniel Lake (born August 29, 1971) is an American college baseball coach who is currently the Coordinator of Baseball Administration / Director of Player Development for South Carolina Gamecocks baseball. He was named the Big South Coach of the Year in 2011, when the Charleston Southern Buccaneers went 29–30 and tied for third place in the conference after finishing last in 2010.

== Playing career ==
In the early 1990s, Lake played baseball at USC Salkehatchie and Newberry College and graduated from Charleston Southern University in 1994.

== Coaching career ==
=== Assistant coaching ===
After graduating from Charleston Southern in 1994, Lake spent four years as a high school baseball coach. His first collegiate coaching experience came in four seasons with South Carolina (1999–2002). During his tenure, the Gamecocks appeared in three NCAA Tournaments and were national runners-up once. Lake then spent one season at College of Charleston (2003), three at Ole Miss (2004–2006), and two at The Citadel (2007–2008).

=== Charleston Southern ===
Lake was hired to replace Jason Murray as Charleston Southern's head coach for the start of the 2009 season. After finishing 7th and 10th in the Big South in his first two seasons, the Buccaneers tied for 3rd in 2011, earning Lake the Big South Coach of the Year award. In 2014, Charleston Southern had its first winning season under Lake, going 30–26.

== Head coaching record ==
Below is a table of Lake's yearly records as a collegiate head baseball coach.

Record table
Season	Team	Overall	Conference	Standing	Postseason
Charleston Southern (Big South Conference) (2009–2016)
2009	Charleston Southern	16–37	10–15	7th	Big South Tournament
2010	Charleston Southern	20–35	9–17	10th	
2011	Charleston Southern	29–30	15–12	T-3rd	Big South Tournament
2012	Charleston Southern	20–36	11–13	T-7th	Big South Tournament
2013	Charleston Southern	22–34	11–13	3rd (South)	Big South Tournament
2014	Charleston Southern	30–26	12–14	3rd (South)	Big South Tournament
2015	Charleston Southern	23–30	10–14	7th	Big South Tournament
2016	Charleston Southern	19–34	6–18	10th	
Charleston Southern:		179–262	84–98		
Total:		179–262			
National champion Postseason invitational champion Conference regular season champion Conference regular season and conference tournament champion Division regular season champion Division regular season and conference tournament champion Conference tournament champion

== See also ==
- Charleston Southern Buccaneers
