= Alex Guerra =

Baseball coach and former infielder

Current position
- Title: Head coach
- Team: Radford
- Conference: Big South
- Record: 79–133

Biographical details
- Born: September 3, 1988 (age 38); Wantagh, New York, U.S.

Playing career
- 2007–2008: Greensboro
- 2009–2011: Radford
- Position: Infielder

Coaching career (HC unless noted)
- 2012–2013: UCF (C)
- 2014–2015: Radford (H/RC)
- 2016–2022: James Madison (H/RC)
- 2023–present: Radford

Head coaching record
- Overall: 79–133
- Tournaments: NCAA: 0–0

Alexander Joseph Guerra (born September 3, 1988) is an American baseball coach and former infielder, who is the current head baseball coach of the Radford Highlanders. He played college baseball at Greensboro in 2007 and 2008 before transferring to Radford from 2009 to 2011.

== Playing career ==
Guerra grew up in Wantagh, New York, where he attended Wantagh High School, where he was a letterwinner in baseball and football. Guerra would go on to play college baseball for the Greensboro College Pride. He appeared in 16 games for the Pride in 2007. After sitting out the 2009 season due to transferring, Guerra had a .305 batting average, a .394 on-base percentage (OBP), and a .440 SLG, with five home runs. As a senior in 2011, Guerra batted .317 with a .486 SLG, 6 home runs, and 47 RBIs.

== Coaching career ==
Guerra started his coaching career as director of baseball operations for the UCF Knights in 2012, before moving into a volunteer role in 2013, working with Knights hitters and catchers. He would return to Radford in the summer of 2013, joining the team as an assistant coach. After two seasons, at his alma mater, he took the top assistant role at James Madison.

Guerra was named the head coach of the Radford Highlanders in late June, 2022.

== Head coaching record ==
Record table
Season	Team	Overall	Conference	Standing	Postseason
Radford Highlanders (Big South Conference) (2023–present)
2023	Radford	10–45	2–25	10th	
2024	Radford	16–34	7–16	9th	
2025	Radford	28–28	13–11	T–4th	Big South tournament
2026	Radford	25–26	12–12	5th	Big South tournament
Radford:		79–133	34–64		
Total:		79–133			
National champion Postseason invitational champion Conference regular season champion Conference regular season and conference tournament champion Division regular season champion Division regular season and conference tournament champion Conference tournament champion
