= 1985 Big South Conference baseball tournament =

- Teams: 4
- Format: Double-elimination
- Finals site: Taylor Stadium; Buies Creek, North Carolina
- Champions: Winthrop (1st title)
- MVP: Jeff Dodig, Winthrop & John Posey (Campbell)

The 1985 Big South Conference baseball tournament was the postseason baseball tournament for the Big South Conference, held from May 13 through 15, 1985, at Taylor Stadium on the campus of Campbell University in Buies Creek, North Carolina. In this, the first year of existence for the conference, four teams participated in the double-elimination tournament. The conference was composed of teams playing at the NCAA Division I, NCAA Division II, and NAIA levels, and had yet to be certified as an NCAA Division I conference. No automatic bids were awarded, although teams could participate in tournaments with at-large invitations.

== Format ==
The four teams that participated were matched in a blind draw, as no conference standings were kept in the inaugural season.

== Bracket and results ==
First round
Winthrop	10
Columbus State	9
Armstrong State	6
Campbell	5
Lower round 1
Columbus State	5
Campbell	10

Semi-finals
Winthrop	7
Armstrong State	5
Lower final
Armstrong State	5
Campbell	11

Finals
Winthrop	12	—
Campbell	5	—

== All-Tournament Team ==
Name	School
Chuck Christopher	Armstrong State
Jeff Dodig	Winthrop
Bill Fortner	Armstrong State
Scott Goins	Winthrop
Dave Patterson	Winthrop
John Posey	Campbell
J.D. Scott	Armstrong State
Waine Shipman	Winthrop
James White	Campbell
Bill Wilkes	Campbell

=== Most Valuable Player ===
Jeff Dodig and John Posey were named co-Most Valuable Players. Dodig was an outfielder for Winthrop and Posey was a third-baseman for Campbell.
