= Danville Otterbots =

Collegiate summer baseball team based in Danville, Virginia, United States

- Logo

Information
- League: Appalachian League
- Location: Danville, Virginia
- Ballpark: American Legion Field
- Founded: 2021
- League championships: 1 (2024)
- Division championships: 1 (2024)
- Colors: Blue, black, orange, gray, white
- Retired numbers: 34 (Wendell Scott); 42 (Jackie Robinson)
- Ownership: Ryan Keur
- General manager: Matt McLaughlin
- Manager: Mickey Tettleton
- Coach: Tommy Williams
- Website: Official website

The Danville Otterbots are a summer collegiate baseball team of the Appalachian League. They are located in Danville, Virginia, and play their home games at American Legion Field.

== History ==
=== Previous Danville teams ===
From 1993 to 2020, Danville, Virginia, hosted the Danville Braves. On September 3, 2006, Danville won their first Appalachian League championship, defeating the Elizabethton Twins, two games to one, in a best-of-three series. On September 3, 2009, the Braves won their second Appalachian League championship, again defeating Elizabethton, this time two games to zero.

=== Collegiate summer team ===
In conjunction with a contraction of Minor League Baseball beginning with the 2021 season, the Appalachian League was reorganized as a collegiate summer baseball league, and the Danville Braves franchise continued under a new name, the Danville Otterbots, in the revamped league designed for rising college freshmen and sophomores.

=== Ballpark sensory room ===
In April 2022, the Otterbots held a ribbon cutting ceremony for Luca's Place, their Ballpark Sensory Room. They became the first team in Appalachian League history to have a sensory room inside their gates, joining less than 15 other ballparks across the country with such a feature.

=== Awards and recognition ===
Following the Otterbots' inaugural season, they were named Danville's Favorite Family Fun Spot by Showcase Magazine readers. Following the 2022 season, General Manager Austin Scher was named Appalachian League Executive of the Year.
