= Danville Braves =

Former Minor League Baseball team based in Danville, Virginia

- 1993–2020; Danville, Virginia
Team logo
Cap insignia

Minor league affiliations
- Class: Rookie (1993–2020)
- League: Appalachian League (1993–2020)

Major league affiliations
- Team: Atlanta Braves (1993–2020)

Minor league titles
- League titles (4): 2009; 2006; 1991; 1986
- Division titles (10): 2009; 2007; 2006; 2005; 2004; 2000; 1991; 1989; 1986; 1984

Team data
- Name: Danville Braves (1993–2020)
- Ballpark: American Legion Field (1993–2020)

The Danville Braves were a Minor League Baseball team in Danville, Virginia. They were an Advanced Rookie-level team in the Appalachian League and were a farm team of the Atlanta Braves. The Braves have played home games at American Legion Post 325 Field. Opened in 1993, Legion Field held 2,588 fans. Before coming to Danville, they played at Calfee Park in Pulaski, Virginia.

On September 3, 2006, Danville won their first ever Appalachian League championship, defeating the Elizabethton Twins 2 games to 1, in a best of three series. On September 3, 2009, Danville won their second Appalachian League championship, again defeating the Elizabethton Twins, this time two games to zero.

The Danville Braves mascot was a large, green bird named Blooper.

In 2019, they had an attendance of 30,000.

The start of the 2020 season was postponed due to the COVID-19 pandemic before ultimately being cancelled on June 30. In conjunction with a contraction of Minor League Baseball beginning with the 2021 season, the Appalachian League was reorganized as a collegiate summer baseball league designed for rising college freshmen and sophomores. The Braves franchise continued as the Danville Otterbots in the revamped league.

== Notable players ==
Notable players who have played for Danville include:

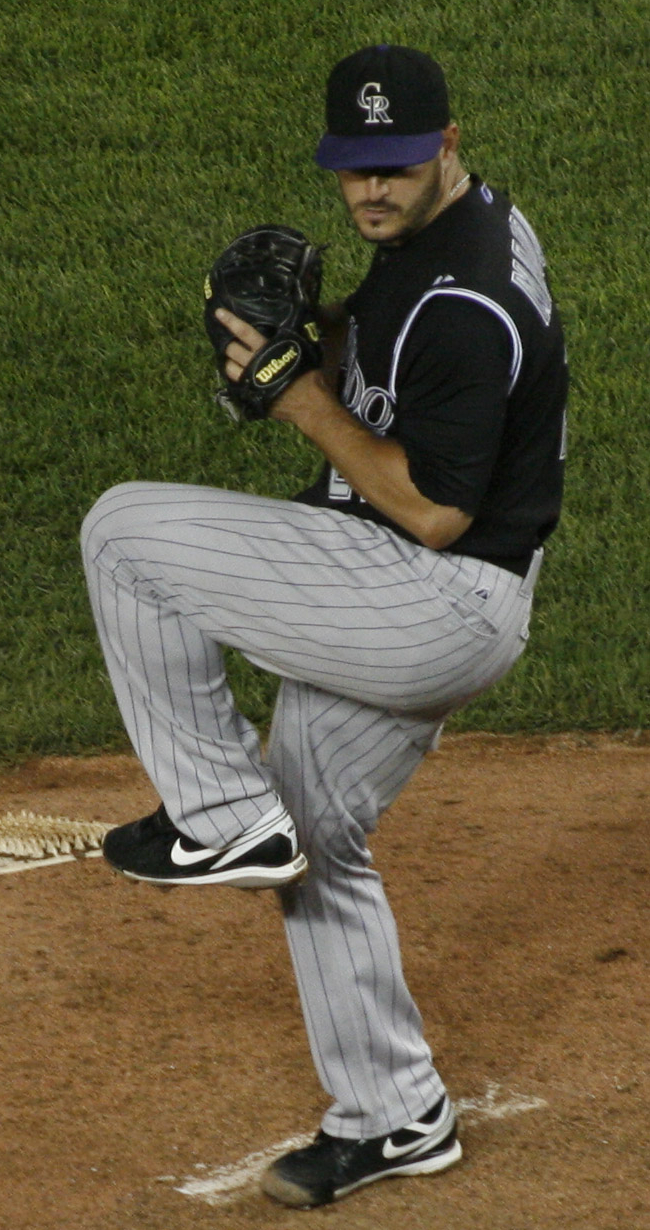
Jason Marquis

- Manny Acosta (2005)
- Ronald Acuña Jr. (2015)
- Ian Anderson (2016)
- Elvis Andrus (2005)
- Wilson Betemit (1999)
- Kyle Davies (2002)
- Jermaine Dye (1993)
- Jeff Francoeur (2002)
- Rafael Furcal (1998)
- Evan Gattis (2010)
- Marcus Giles (1997)
- Tommy Hanson (2006)
- Matt Harrison (2004)
- Jason Heyward (2007)
- Andruw Jones (1994)
- Craig Kimbrel (2008)
- Adam LaRoche (2000)
- Jason Marquis (1996)
- Andy Marte (2001)
- Kris Medlen (2006)
- Kevin Millwood (1994)
- John Rocker (1994)
- Andrelton Simmons (2010)
- Randall Simon (1993)
- Julio Teherán (2008)
- Joey Terdoslavich (2010)
- Adam Wainwright (2000)
- Esteban Yan (1993)

== Playoffs ==
- 2014: Defeated Princeton 2–0 in semifinals; lost to Johnson City 2–1 in finals.
- 2012: Lost to Elizabethton 2–1 in semifinals.
- 2011: Lost to Johnson City 2–1 in semifinals.
- 2009: Defeated Elizabethton 2–0 to win championship.
- 2007: Lost to Elizabethton 2–0 in finals.
- 2006: Defeated Elizabethton 2–1 to win championship.
- 2005: Lost to Elizabethton 2–1 in finals.
- 2004: Lost to Greeneville 2–1 in finals.
- 2000: Lost to Elizabethton 2–0 in finals.
