= Jim Perry Stadium =

Baseball stadium in Buies Creek, North Carolina, US

Coordinates: 35.41049°N 78.73546°W

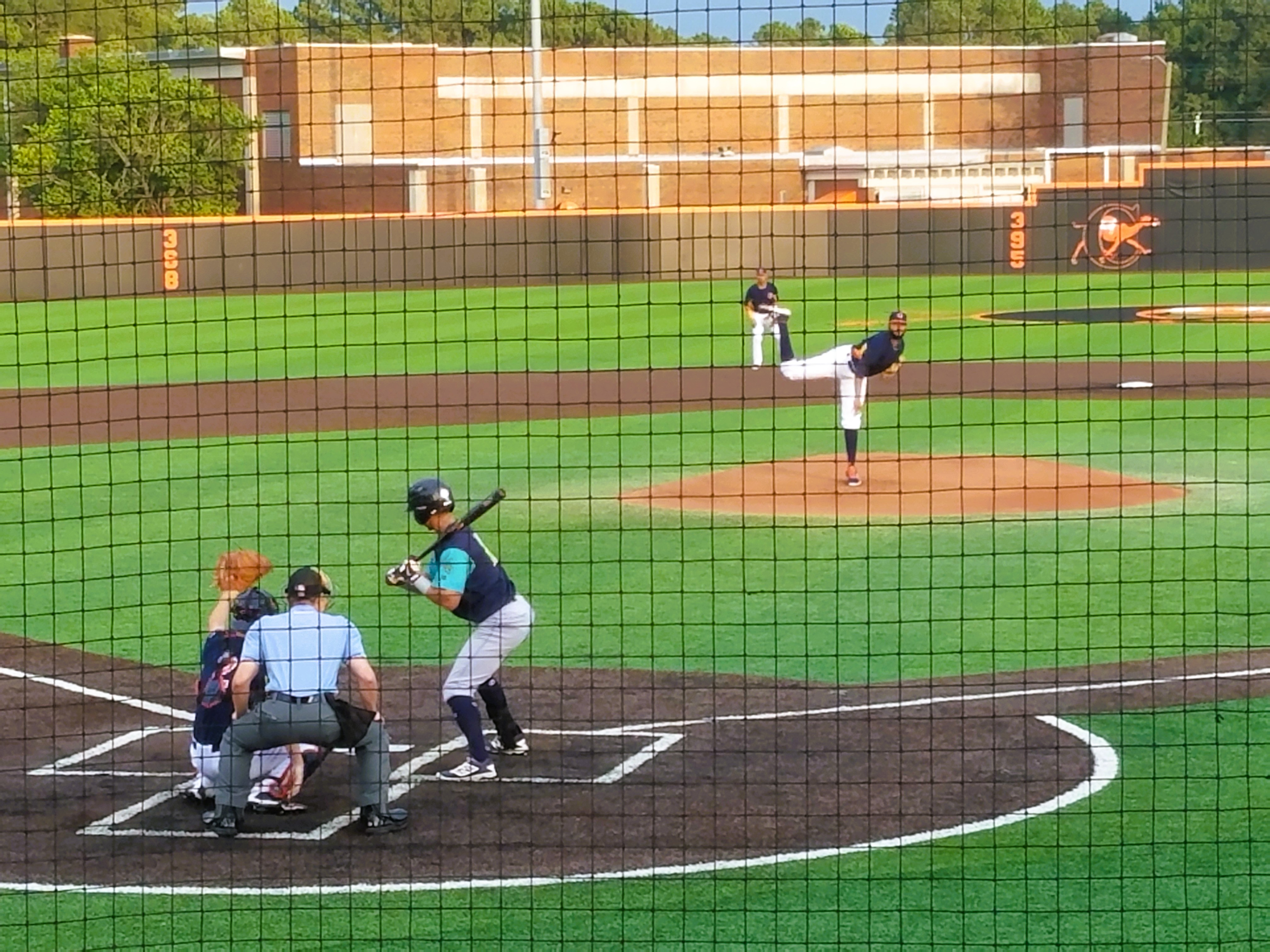
- Lynchburg Hillcats at Buies Creek Astros, August 24, 2017

- Location within North Carolina Location within the United States
- Interactive map of Jim Perry Stadium
- Former names: Taylor Field (?–2012)
- Capacity: 1,250 total
- Field size: Left field: 337 feet (103 m); Left center field: 368 feet (112 m); Center field: 395 feet (120 m); Right center field: 375 feet (114 m); Right field: 328 feet (100 m)

Construction
- Renovated: 2011–2012, 2017-2018

Tenants
- Campbell Fighting Camels (NCAA CAA); Buies Creek Astros (CL) 2017–2018

Jim Perry Stadium is a baseball stadium in Buies Creek, North Carolina. It is home to the Campbell Fighting Camels baseball team. Previously known as Taylor Field, the venue dates back to the 1940s and Campbell's junior college baseball days. Taylor Field was named for Herbert B. Taylor, a supporter of Campbell University's athletics programs. Following the 2012 season, the field was renamed for Jim Perry, who played baseball and basketball for Campbell from 1956 to 1959. Perry later pitched for 17 seasons in Major League Baseball, earning the 1970 American League Cy Young Award with the Minnesota Twins.

The field dimensions are 337 feet down the left field line, 368 feet in left-center, 395 feet to straight-away center, 375 feet to the right-center, and 328 feet down the right field line. Renovations began in 2011, and included a new entrance and ticket booth, restrooms and concession stand, as well as improved exterior landscaping. The stadium was dedicated prior to a 6–3 victory over in-state rival Duke on March 26, 2013.

A later addition was a new grandstand that stretches from dugout to dugout and featured 310 chairback seats, with an overall seating capacity then of 630. New dugouts were constructed, with the home dugout built in-ground. A pavilion was also added, dedicated to Jim and Daphne Perry. Prior to the 2017 seasons, ProGrass Turf installed a complete turf playing surface, and new chair seat backs were added, bringing the stadiums' capacity to over 1,000 seats. This newest addition also provided a state-of-the-art locker room, and new offices for the entire Campbell baseball operation. An HD video board has been added, the largest in the Big South Conference, measuring 35' 7 1/2" tall and 42' 6 1/2" wide.

Taylor Field hosted the 1985, 1987, and 1988 Big South Conference baseball tournaments. Winthrop won in 1985 and 1987, while Campbell won on its home field in 1988.

In 2017 and 2018, Jim Perry Stadium was home to the Houston Astros' new Carolina League affiliate, the Buies Creek Astros, an A-Advanced league team, who played there during construction of a new ballpark in Fayetteville. The Astros won the 2018 Carolina League championship at Jim Perry Stadium.

== See also ==
- List of NCAA Division I baseball venues
