= American Legion Field (Danville) =

Stadium in Danville, Virginia

Coordinates: 36°34′33″N 79°22′21″W

- Interactive map of American Legion Field
- Location: 302 River Park Dr; Danville, VA 24540
- Capacity: 2,588
- Surface: Grass
- Field size: LF 330; CF 400; RF 330

Construction
- Opened: 1993

Tenants
- Danville Braves (1993–2020); Danville Otterbots (2021-present)

American Legion Field is a stadium in Danville, Virginia. Located in this Southside Virginia city's Dan Daniel Memorial Park, just north of the Dan River, it is primarily used for baseball and is the home field of Danville Otterbots in the Appalachian League, a summer collegiate baseball league. It previously hosted the Danville Braves Minor League Baseball team from 1993 to 2020. It was built in 1993 and was named for American Legion Memorial Post 325, which serves the city's northern half. It holds 2,588 people, in a V-shaped configuration of several disconnected units running from the first to third base side.

The venue hosted the 2002 American Legion Baseball World Series won by West Point, MS Post 212. It also hosted the 2001 and 2008 Big South Conference baseball tournaments, both won by Coastal Carolina.
