= Charles Watson Stadium =

Baseball stadium in Conway, South Carolina, US

Coordinates: 33.793557°N 79.015399°W

Charles Watson Stadium was a baseball stadium located on the campus of Coastal Carolina University in Conway, South Carolina, which opened in 1930. It has since been replaced with Springs Brooks Stadium.

== History ==
Stadium capacity was expanded to nearly 2,200 during the 2008 season, with the addition of a right field deck dubbed "The Rooster's Nest". With the addition of temporary seating down the base lines, the stadium played host to an NCAA Regional for the first time in 2008. In 2007, the Chanticleers hosted an NCAA Regional for the first time, but due to the limited seating capacity at Charles Watson Stadium, the event was hosted at nearby BB&T Coastal Field.

The field has hosted eight Big South tournaments, more than any other venue. It hosted the event in 1990–93, 1999–2000, and 2005–06.

In 2010, the Chanticleers ranked 42nd among Division I baseball programs in attendance, averaging 1,318 per home game.

== See also ==
- List of NCAA Division I baseball venues
