= Winthrop Ballpark =

Baseball venue in Rock Hill, South Carolina, US

Founders Field
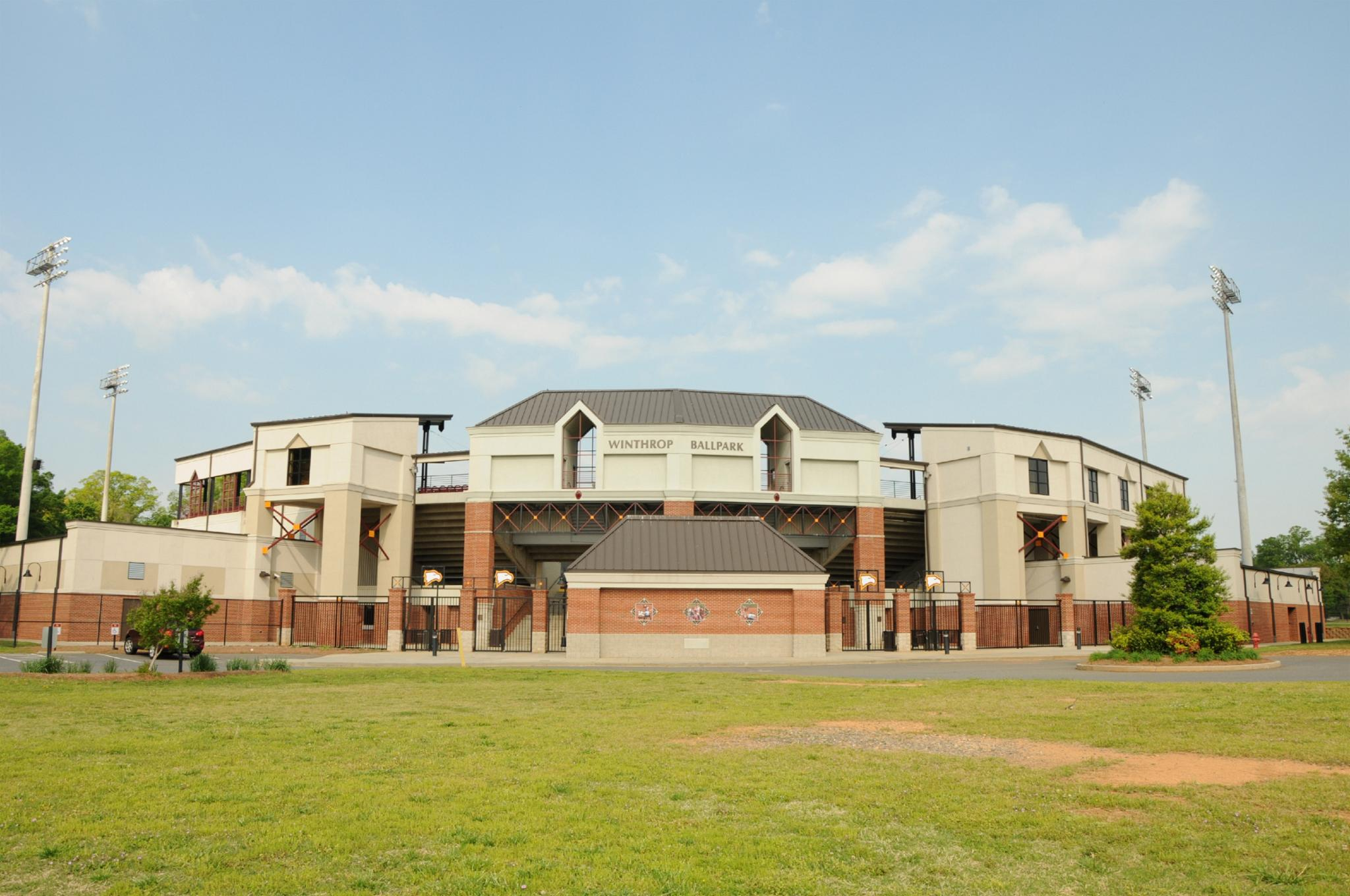
- Interactive map of Founders Field
- Location: 290 University Lake Drive, Rock Hill, South Carolina, U.S.
- Coordinates: 34.945794°N 81.018575°W
- Owner: Winthrop University
- Operator: Winthrop University
- Capacity: 1,989
- Executive suites: 1
- Surface: Natural grass (infield and outfield), artificial turf basepaths and behind home plate
- Scoreboard: Electronic

Construction
- Renovated: 2000–01, 2008
- Cost: $2.2 million (2000–01 renovations)

Tenant
- Winthrop Eagles (NCAA)

Founders Field, formerly Winthrop Ballpark, is a baseball venue in Rock Hill, South Carolina. It is home to the Winthrop Eagles baseball team of the NCAA Division I Big South Conference. The venue has a capacity of 1,989 spectators.

== History ==
Renovations between the 2000 and 2001 season added the Wayne Patrick Press Box, stadium lightning, dugouts, and concessions. In 2008, further renovations added offices, practice facilities, a weight room, a dugout, a players lounge, and a luxury box.

The venue has hosted five Big South Conference baseball tournaments, in 2002, 2003, 2004, 2007, and 2010. Coastal Carolina has won all of them.

In 2025, Winthrop University Athletics and Founders Federal Credit Union announced a 5-year, $1.5 million investment for naming rights to the ballpark.

== See also ==
- List of NCAA Division I baseball venues
