= USC Upstate Spartans baseball =

Big South Conference NCAA Division I baseball team

USC Upstate Spartans
- 2026 USC Upstate Spartans baseball team
- Founded: 1986
- University: University of South Carolina Upstate
- Head coach: Kane Sweeney (2nd season)
- Conference: Big South Conference
- Location: Spartanburg, South Carolina
- Home stadium: Cleveland S. Harley Baseball Park (capacity: 500)
- Nickname: Spartans
- Colors: Green, white, and black

NCAA tournament appearances
- 2025, 2026

Conference tournament champions
- 1987, 1988, 1990, 2025, 2026

Conference regular season champions
- 1988, 2021, 2025, 2026

The USC Upstate Spartans baseball team is a varsity intercollegiate athletic team of the University of South Carolina Upstate in Spartanburg, South Carolina, United States. The team is a member of the Big South Conference, which is part of the National Collegiate Athletic Association's Division I. The team plays its home games at Harley Park in Spartanburg, South Carolina. The Spartans are coached by Kane Sweeney.

== USC Upstate in the NCAA Tournament ==
Year	Region	Opponent	Result
2025	0–2	.000	Clemson Regional
2026	1–2	.333	Tuscaloosa Regional
TOTALS	1–4	.200	

== MLB Draft Selections ==
USC Upstate has had 18 Major League Baseball draft selections since the draft began in 1965.

Spartans in the Major League Baseball Draft

Year	Player	Round	Team
Trent Hodgdon	2024	17	Cincinnati Reds
Alex Garbrick	2021	17	Philadelphia Phillies
Jordan Marks	2021	8	Detroit Tigers
Blake Whitney	2018	24	Chicago Cubs
Chad Sobotka	2015	4	Atlanta Braves
David Roseboom	2014	17	New York Mets
Gaither Bumgardner	2013	23	Anaheim Angels
Scott DeCecco	2012	21	Seattle Mariners
Matt Branham	2010	27	San Diego Padres
Teddy Fallon	2009	43	Pittsburgh Pirates
Brandon Williams	2006	29	Pittsburgh Pirates
Kenneth Penland	1988	40	Texas Rangers
Jerry Brock	1988	35	San Francisco Giants
Dwayne Van Horne	1988	34	Cincinnati Reds
Lindsey Robinson	1988	32	Texas Rangers
Eric Given	1988	20	Houston Astros
Pat Tilmon	1987	26	Toronto Blue Jays
Chris Hawkins	1987	15	Houston Astros
