= Gary Gilmore (baseball) =

American baseball coach

Playing career
- 1979–1980: Coastal Carolina
- Position: Center fielder

Coaching career (HC unless noted)
- 1986–1989: USC Aiken (assistant)
- 1990–1995: USC Aiken
- 1996–2024: Coastal Carolina

Head coaching record
- Overall: 1,371–699–5 (.662)
- Tournaments: NCAA: 37–35; Big South: 63–19; Sun Belt: 13–8

Accomplishments and honors

Championships
- 2016 College World Series

Awards
- ABCA Hall of Fame (2022); ABCA Division II South Atlantic Region Coach of the Year (1993); ABCA Division II Coach of the Year (1993); ABCA Division I Atlantic Region Coach of the Year (2005); 8x Big South Coach of the Year (1999, 2002, 2005, 2007–2010, 2012); 2x Sun Belt Coach of the Year (2018, 2023); Salem-Roanoke Baseball Hall of Fame; USC Aiken Athletic Hall of Fame

Gary R. Gilmore is an American college baseball coach who was the head coach of the Coastal Carolina Chanticleers. He coached the team from 1996 through 2024. Under Gilmore, Coastal Carolina qualified for 19 NCAA tournaments, most recently in 2024. In 2016, the team made its first appearance in the College World Series and won the NCAA title. He was elected to the ABCA Hall of Fame in 2022.

== Playing and scouting careers ==
A native of Franklin County, Virginia, Gilmore played two seasons (1979–1980) of baseball at Coastal Carolina. A center fielder, Gilmore had a .353 career batting average. He also played minor league baseball in the Philadelphia Phillies organization for a short time.

In the early 1980s, Gilmore served as a scout for both the Seattle Mariners and Cleveland Indians. In 1982, Gilmore became a physical education teacher at Deep Creek Elementary School in Georgetown County, South Carolina. He later joined Pleasant Hill High School as an assistant baseball coach in the spring of 1983. Following the retirement of the head coach, Pleasant Hill promoted Gilmore to head coach for the 1984 season.

== Coaching career ==
=== USC Aiken ===
In 1986, Gilmore left scouting to become an assistant coach at USC Aiken. Prior to the start of the 1990 season, he was named the program's head coach. In his first two seasons, the Pacers had a combined winning percentage of over .800 as an NAIA program. The school's athletic programs moved to NCAA Division II for the start of the 1991–1992 academic year. In 1992, the program's first NCAA season, the Pacers went 45–18–2 and qualified for the NCAA tournament. In 1993, Gilmore was named the Division II ABCA National Coach of the Year after USC Aiken went 46–18 and reached the Division II College World Series. In 1994 and 1995, Gilmore's final two seasons at USC Aiken, his teams had a combined record of 69–46, but both failed to qualify for the NCAA tournament.

Two future Major League Baseball (MLB) players, Adam Riggs and Bryan Ward, played under Gilmore at USC Aiken.

=== Coastal Carolina ===
Gilmore became the head coach of Division I Coastal Carolina for the start of the 1996 season. After losing seasons in 1996 and 1997, the Chanticleers qualified for the postseason under Gilmore for the first time in 1998. With an 11–7 conference record, the team finished second in the Big South and qualified for the Big South Tournament. There, Coastal Carolina finished as the runner-up to Liberty. In 1999, the team won the Big South regular season championship with a 10–2 conference record. It hosted the Big South Tournament, but lost to Winthrop in the championship game. Gilmore was named the 1999 Big South Coach of the Year. In 2000, the team finished tied for fourth in the Big South and was eliminated early in the conference tournament.

In 2001, the team finished second and won the Big South Tournament to qualify for its first NCAA tournament during Gilmore's tenure. The team won its first two games in the double-elimination Athens Regional, but host Georgia came out of the loser's bracket to defeat the Chanticleers twice and advance to the Super Regionals.

From 2001 to 2005, Coastal Carolina made five consecutive appearances in the NCAA tournament. In that time span, the team won four consecutive Big South Tournaments from 2001 to 2004, and Gilmore was named conference Coach of the Year in both 2002 and 2005. In the three NCAA tournaments from 2002 to 2004, the team finished no higher than third in a regional. In 2005 season, the team lost to Winthrop in the Big South Tournament championship game but received an at-large bid to the NCAA tournament, its first such bid in Gilmore's tenure. In the Tempe Regional, the Chanticleers lost in the regional final to Arizona State.

In 2006, Coastal Carolina went 30–27 and finished third in the Big South. At the conference tournament, which it hosted, the team went 1–2, and it did not receive a bid to the NCAA tournament.

From 2007 to 2012, Coastal Carolina won six consecutive Big South regular season and tournament titles; the program qualified for the NCAA tournament in each season. Gilmore won the Big South Coach of the Year award in five of the six seasons (2007–2010, 2012). The program won at least 40 games in each season and at least 50 in 2007, 2008, and 2010.

The Chanticleers hosted three NCAA regionals in the six-year span and advanced to the Super Regional round twice. In 2007, the program hosted an NCAA regional for the first time but lost to second-seeded Clemson in the regional final. The team finished with a 50–13 record, and Gilmore signed a contract through the 2015 season following the season. In 2008, the Chanticleers hosted and won the Conway Regional, scoring at least 10 runs in wins over fourth-seeded Columbia, third-seeded Alabama, and second-seeded East Carolina. In the Cary Super Regional, Coastal Carolina lost to No. 2 national seed North Carolina, two games to none. In 2010, Coastal Carolina had a 25–0 Big South record and went 4–0 at the Big South Tournament to earn an automatic bid to the NCAA tournament. It was selected as the No. 4 national seed and hosted the Myrtle Beach Regional. There, after losing its second game to College of Charleston, the team won three consecutive games to win the regional from the loser's bracket. It then hosted the best-of-three Myrtle Beach Super Regional against eventual national champion South Carolina. In it, Coastal Carolina lost both games, 4–3 and 10–9, respectively, and was eliminated from the tournament.

In 2013, the Big South split into two divisions. Coastal Carolina won the South Division. After being eliminated from the Big South Tournament, the team received an at-large bid to the NCAA tournament but went 0–2 at the Blacksburg Regional.

Under Gilmore, Coastal Carolina's home field, Charles Watson Stadium, was renovated several times during the early 2000s. During the 2013 season, it was rebuilt as part of a $10.2 million project to rebuild Coastal Carolina's baseball and softball facilities.

On April 17, 2014, Gilmore earned his 1,000th career victory as the Chanticleers defeated Presbyterian College 4–3 in 13 innings at TicketReturn.com Field in Myrtle Beach, SC.

On June 30, 2016, Gilmore led Coastal to the National Championship, with a 4–3 victory over Arizona. It was Coastal's first trip to the CWS in program history. Coastal was the second school in South Carolina to win the CWS, following South Carolina in 2010 and 2011.

On May 30, 2023, Gilmore announced that the 2024 season would be his last. He was diagnosed with cancer in his liver and pancreas in 2020.

Ten of Gilmore's players at Coastal Carolina have played in Major League Baseball: Mike Costanzo, Dave Sappelt, Tommy La Stella, Keith Hessler, Rico Noel, Taylor Motter, Jacob May, Zach Remillard, Anthony Veneziano, and Austin Kitchen. His players have been selected in the MLB draft 89 times, with several players drafted multiple times.

== Head coaching records ==
Below is a table of Gilmore's yearly records as an NCAA head baseball coach.

Record table
Season	Team	Overall	Conference	Standing	Postseason
USC Aiken Pacers (NAIA) (1990)
1990	USC Aiken	45–10			
USC Aiken Pacers (NCAA Division II independent) (1991)
1991	USC Aiken	48–13			
USC Aiken Pacers (Peach Belt Conference) (1992–1995)
1992	USC Aiken	45–15–2	10–2–1		NCAA regional
1993	USC Aiken	46–18	13–7		College World Series
1994	USC Aiken	35–22	16–5	1st	
1995	USC Aiken	34–24	14–10		
USC Aiken:		253–102–2	53–24–1		
Coastal Carolina Chanticleers (Big South Conference) (1996–2016)
1996	Coastal Carolina	24–29	11–10	4th	
1997	Coastal Carolina	23–31	5–16	t-7th	
1998	Coastal Carolina	31–29	11–7	2nd	
1999	Coastal Carolina	43–15	10–2	1st	
2000	Coastal Carolina	34–24	11–10	t-4th	
2001	Coastal Carolina	42–20	16–4	2nd	NCAA regional
2002	Coastal Carolina	44–19	16–5	1st	NCAA regional
2003	Coastal Carolina	45–18	12–7	t-2nd	NCAA regional
2004	Coastal Carolina	40–23	16–8	t-2nd	NCAA regional
2005	Coastal Carolina	50–16	21–3	1st	NCAA regional
2006	Coastal Carolina	30–27	15–9	3rd	
2007	Coastal Carolina	50–13	17–4	1st	NCAA regional
2008	Coastal Carolina	50–14	17–3	1st	NCAA Super Regional
2009	Coastal Carolina	47–16	21–5	1st	NCAA regional
2010	Coastal Carolina	55–10	25–0	1st	NCAA Super Regional
2011	Coastal Carolina	42–20	20–7	1st	NCAA regional
2012	Coastal Carolina	42–19	18–5	1st	NCAA regional
2013	Coastal Carolina	37–23	18–6	1st (South)	NCAA regional
2014	Coastal Carolina	24–33	13–13	2nd (South)	
2015	Coastal Carolina	39–21	17–7	2nd	NCAA regional
2016	Coastal Carolina	55–18	21–3	1st	College World Series Champion
Coastal Carolina:			331–134		
Coastal Carolina (Sun Belt Conference) (2017–2024)
2017	Coastal Carolina	37–19–1	22–7–1	1st (East)	
2018	Coastal Carolina	43–19	23–7	1st(East)	NCAA regional
2019	Coastal Carolina	36–26–1	15–13	2nd (East)	NCAA regional
2020	Coastal Carolina	11–5	0–0	(East)	Season canceled due to COVID-19
2021	Coastal Carolina	27–24	9–12	6th (East)	
2022	Coastal Carolina	39–20–1	21–8–1	3rd	NCAA regional
2023	Coastal Carolina	42–21	23–7	1st (East)	NCAA regional
2024	Coastal Carolina	36–25	16–14	7th	NCAA regional
Coastal Carolina:		1,118–597–3	130–68–2		
Total:		1,371–699–5			
National champion Postseason invitational champion Conference regular season champion Conference regular season and conference tournament champion Division regular season champion Division regular season and conference tournament champion Conference tournament champion

== Hall of fame inductions ==
Gilmore was inducted into the Salem-Roanoke Baseball Hall of Fame in 2010 and the USC Aiken Athletic Hall of Fame in 2013.

== See also ==
- List of college baseball career coaching wins leaders
