= Gardner–Webb Runnin' Bulldogs baseball =

Gardner–Webb Runnin' Bulldogs
- 2026 Gardner–Webb Runnin' Bulldogs baseball team
- University: Gardner–Webb University
- Head coach: Jim Chester (7th season)
- Conference: Big South Conference
- Location: Boiling Springs, North Carolina
- Home stadium: John Henry Moss Stadium (capacity: 700)
- Nickname: Runnin' Bulldogs
- Colors: Red and black

NCAA tournament appearances
- Division II: 2000

The Gardner–Webb Runnin' Bulldogs baseball team is the varsity intercollegiate athletic team of the Gardner–Webb University in Boiling Springs, North Carolina, United States. The team competes in the National Collegiate Athletic Association's Division I and is a member of the Big South Conference. The team joined NCAA Division I in 2003.

== Major League Baseball ==
Gardner–Webb has had 18 Major League Baseball draft selections.

Bulldogs in the Major League Baseball Draft
Year	Player	Round	Team
1967	Wayne Church	68th	Cincinnati Reds
1967	Luis Flores	7th	Atlanta Braves
1972	Roger McSwain	3rd	Chicago White Sox
1974	Dave Heffner	27th	Detroit Tigers
1985	Neal Cargile	12th	New York Yankees
2003	Samuel Bradford	16th	Seattle Mariners
2004	Jeff Long	12th	Atlanta Braves
2005	Zach Ward	3rd	Cincinnati Reds
2008	Adam Bullard	43rd	Atlanta Braves
2016	Jeremy Walker	22nd	Atlanta Braves
2016	Brad Haymes	17th	Chicago White Sox
2016	Ryan Boelter	33rd	Chicago White Sox
2018	Mason Fox	21st	San Diego Padres
2018	Tyler Johnson	30th	New York Yankees
2019	Chandler Redmond	32nd	St. Louis Cardinals
2019	Justin Kunz	33rd	Los Angeles Angels
2021	Mason Miller	3rd	Oakland Athletics
