= Presbyterian Blue Hose baseball =

American college baseball team

Presbyterian Blue Hose
- 2026 Presbyterian Blue Hose baseball team
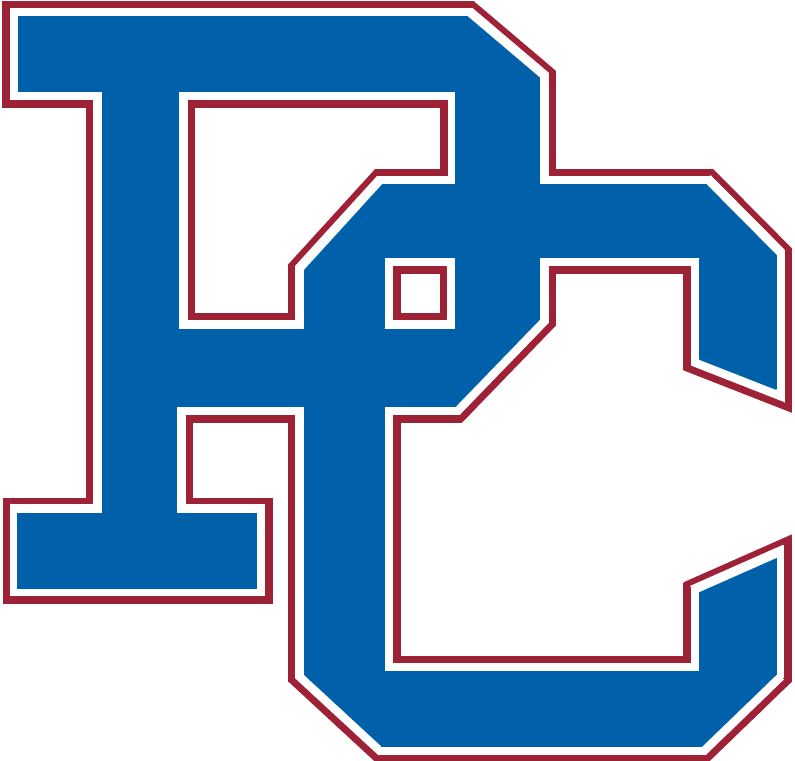
- University: Presbyterian College
- Head coach: Elton Pollock (22nd season)
- Conference: Big South
- Location: Clinton, South Carolina
- Home stadium: Presbyterian Baseball Complex
- Nickname: Blue Hose
- Colors: Blue and garnet

NCAA tournament appearances
- Division II: 1998, 2003; Division I: 2021

Conference tournament champions
- 2021

Conference regular season champions
- 2003, 2024

The Presbyterian College Blue Hose baseball team is a varsity intercollegiate athletic team of Presbyterian College in Clinton, South Carolina. The team is a member of the Big South Conference, which is part of the National Collegiate Athletic Association's Division I. The team plays its home games at Presbyterian Baseball Complex in Clinton, South Carolina. The Blue Hose are coached by Elton Pollock.

== Presbyterian in the NCAA tournament ==
Year	Record	Pct	Notes
2021	0–2	.000	Nashville Regional
TOTALS	0–2	.000	

== Major League Baseball ==
Presbyterian College has had 8 Major League Baseball draft selections since the draft began in 1965.

Blue Hose in the Major League Baseball Draft
Year	Player	Round	Team
1993	Joe Berube	24	Mariners
1995	Elton Pollock	15	Pirates
1995	Ryan Kane	6	Angels
1998	Gene Gobbel	24	Mets
2000	Matt Martunas	18	Devil Rays
2013	Bud Jeter	25	Diamondbacks
2024	Daniel Eagen	3	Diamondbacks
2024	Joel Dragoo	7	Phillies

== See also ==
- List of NCAA Division I baseball programs
