= High Point Panthers baseball =

Big South NCAA Division I baseball team

- 2026 High Point Panthers baseball team
- Founded: 1933
- Overall record: 603–741–1
- University: High Point University
- Head coach: Joey Hammond (5th season)
- Conference: Big South Conference
- Location: High Point, North Carolina, United States
- Home stadium: George S. Erath Field (capacity: 500)
- Nickname: Panthers
- Colors: Purple and white

NCAA tournament appearances
- 2024

Conference tournament champions
- 2024

Conference regular season champions
- 2026

The High Point Panthers baseball team represents High Point University, which is located in High Point, North Carolina. The Panthers are an NCAA Division I college baseball program that competes in the Big South Conference. They began competing in Division I in 2000 and joined the Big South Conference the same season.

The High Point Panthers play all home games on campus at George S. Erath Field. Over their 24 seasons in the Big South Conference, they have played in 19 Big South Tournaments, advancing to the finals twice and winning once in 2024.

Since the program's inception in 1933, four Panthers have gone on to play in Major League Baseball: infielder Dick Culler and relief pitchers Cody Allen, Jaime Schultz and Andre Scrubb.

== Conference membership history (Division I only) ==
- 2000–present: Big South Conference

== High Point in the NCAA Tournament ==
Year	Record	Pct	Notes
2024	1–2	.333	Clemson Regional
TOTALS	1–2	.333	

== George S. Erath Field ==
George S. Erath Field is a baseball stadium on the High Point campus in High Point, North Carolina that seats 550 people.

== Head coaches (Division I only) ==
Records taken from the 2019 High Point baseball media guide.

Season	Coach	Years	Record	Pct.
2000–2001	Jim Speight	2	43–69–1	.384
2002–2008	Sal Bando	7	144–243	.372
2009–2021	Craig Cozart	13	339–337	.501
2022–present	Joey Hammond	3	77–92	.456
Totals	4 coaches	25 seasons	603–741–1	.449

== Year-by-year NCAA Division I results ==
Records taken from the 2024 High Point baseball history and record book.

Record table
Season	Coach	Overall	Conference	Standing	Postseason
Big South Conference (2000–present)
2000	Jim Speight	22–36–1	6–15	8th	Big South Tournament
2001	Jim Speight	21–33	5–14	6th	Big South Tournament
2002	Sal Bando	26–31	9–11	5th	Big South Tournament
2003	Sal Bando	14–37	5–12	7th	
2004	Sal Bando	11–44	4–20	T-8th	
2005	Sal Bando	19–36	6–18	8th	
2006	Sal Bando	27–32	14–10	4th	Big South Tournament
2007	Sal Bando	27–30	10–11	T-4th	Big South Tournament
2008	Sal Bando	20–33	9–12	5th	Big South Tournament
2009	Craig Cozart	21–32	11–12	6th	Big South Tournament
2010	Craig Cozart	31–29	15–12	T-4th	Big South Tournament
2011	Craig Cozart	24–32	9–18	T-8th	Big South Tournament
2012	Craig Cozart	28–31	11–13	T-7th	Big South Tournament
2013	Craig Cozart	29–29	15–9	3rd	Big South Tournament
2014	Craig Cozart	33–22	18–9	3rd	Big South Tournament
2015	Craig Cozart	29–26	14–10	5th	Big South Tournament
2016	Craig Cozart	32–24	14–10	T-2nd	Big South Tournament
2017	Craig Cozart	30–23	13–11	4th	Big South Tournament
2018	Craig Cozart	34–22	19–8	2nd	Big South Tournament
2019	Craig Cozart	27–27	14–13	T-5th	Big South Tournament
2020	Craig Cozart	7–9	0–0	N/A	Cancelled due to the coronavirus pandemic
2021	Craig Cozart	14–31	12–25	9th	Big South Tournament
2022	Joey Hammond	23–33	14–10	4th	Big South Tournament
2023	Joey Hammond	20–34	12–14	T-6th	Big South Tournament
2024	Joey Hammond	34–25	17–7	2nd	Big South Tournament
Total:		603–741–1			
National champion Postseason invitational champion Conference regular season champion Conference regular season and conference tournament champion Division regular season champion Division regular season and conference tournament champion Conference tournament champion

== Appearances in the NCAA tournament ==
Season	Regional	Record	Results
2024	Clemson	1–2 (.333)	eliminated by Coastal Carolina in Clemson Regional
Tournament Record: 1–2 (.333)			Total NCAA tournament Appearances: 1

== Awards and honors (Division I only) ==
- Over their 20 seasons in Division I, two Panthers have been named to an NCAA-recognized All-America team.
- Over their 20 seasons in the Big South Conference, 16 different Panthers have been named to the all-conference first-team.

=== All-Americans ===
Year	Position	Name	Team	Selector
2006	OF	Mark Shorey	3rd	ABCA
2006	OF	Mark Shorey	3rd	CB
2010	OF	Nate Roberts	2nd	ABCA
2010	OF	Nate Roberts	3rd	BA
2010	OF	Nate Roberts	3rd	NCBWA

=== Freshman First-Team All-Americans ===
Year	Position	Name	Selector
2006	C	Billy Alvino	CB
2007	OF	Robby Kuzdale	CB
2012	RP	Joe Goodman	CB
2012	3B	Ryne Rush	CB

=== Big South Conference Player of the Year ===
Year	Position	Name
2006	OF	Mark Shorey
2010	OF	Nate Roberts
2018	OF	Austen Zente

=== Big South Conference Coach of the Year ===
Year	Name
2006	Sal Bando

=== Big South Conference Rookie/Freshman of the Year ===
Year	Position	Name
2007	OF	Robby Kuzdale

Taken from the 2019 High Point baseball media guide. Updated March 11, 2020.

== Panthers in the Major Leagues ==
= All-Star	= Baseball Hall of Famer

Athlete	Years in MLB	MLB teams
Dick Culler	1936, 1943–1949	Philadelphia Athletics, Chicago White Sox, Boston Braves, Chicago Cubs, New York Giants
Cody Allen	2012–2019	Cleveland Indians, Los Angeles Angels
Jaime Schultz	2018–2019	Tampa Bay Rays, Los Angeles Dodgers
Andre Scrubb	2020–2021	Houston Astros

Taken from Baseball Reference. Updated May 29, 2024.

== See also ==
- List of NCAA Division I baseball programs
