= Charleston Southern Buccaneers baseball =

Collegiate baseball team in South Carolina

Charleston Southern Buccaneers
- 2026 Charleston Southern Buccaneers baseball team
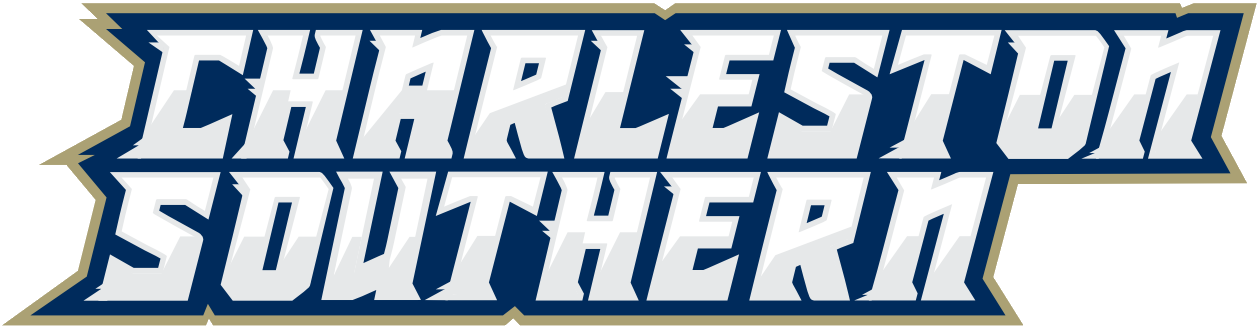
- Founded: 1967
- University: Charleston Southern University
- Head coach: Karl Kuhn (2nd season)
- Conference: Big South Conference
- Location: North Charleston, South Carolina
- Home stadium: CSU Ballpark (Capacity: 1,000)
- Nickname: Buccaneers
- Colors: Blue and gold

NCAA tournament appearances
- 1996

Conference tournament champions
- 1996

The Charleston Southern Buccaneers baseball team is the varsity intercollegiate athletic team of the Charleston Southern University in North Charleston, South Carolina, United States. The team competes in the National Collegiate Athletic Association's Division I and is a member of the Big South Conference, having served as a founding member in 1986.

== NCAA Tournament ==
Charleston Southern has played in the NCAA tournament once.

Season	Region	Opponent	Result
1996	Atlantic Regional	Clemson; Tennessee	L 1–9; L 4–8
