= UNC Asheville Bulldogs baseball =

- 2026 UNC Asheville Bulldogs baseball team
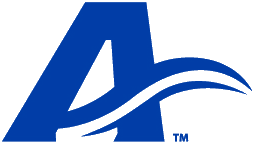
- University: University of North Carolina at Asheville
- Head coach: Alex Raburn (interim)
- Conference: Big South Conference
- Location: Asheville, North Carolina
- Home stadium: Greenwood Baseball Field
- Nickname: Bulldogs
- Colors: Royal blue and white

NCAA tournament appearances
- 2006

Conference regular season champions
- 2006

The UNC Asheville Bulldogs baseball team represents University of North Carolina at Asheville, which is located in Asheville, North Carolina. The Bulldogs began play in 1985. They are an NCAA Division I college baseball program that competes in the Big South Conference. The Bulldogs have never finished a regular season with a record above .500, having only reached .500 in two seasons (1990, 2023) as of 2024.

It was in the 2006 season, when they went into the Big South Tournament with a record of 28-35 (making them the sixth seed of a six-team tournament), that they pulled off a remarkable run, winning four of five tournament games to win the conference, which included a 16-11 victory over Liberty in the championship game where the Bulldogs were down 10-0 after four innings.

== NCAA Tournament ==
UNC Asheville has participated in the NCAA Division I baseball tournament once.

Year	Region	Round	Opponent	Result
2006	Clemson Regional	First Round; Lower Round 1	Clemson; Mississippi State	L 0–3; L 4–5
