= Radford Highlanders baseball =

Radford Highlanders
- 2026 Radford Highlanders baseball team
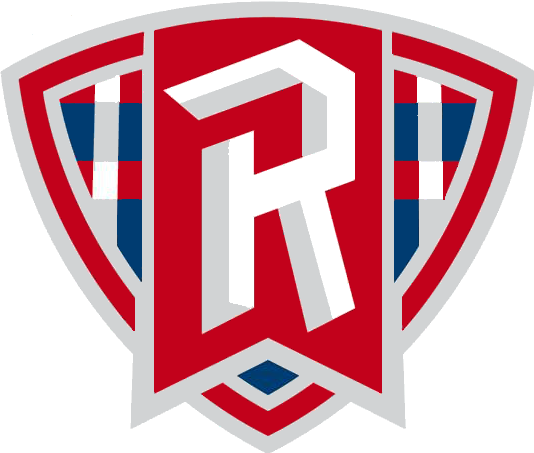
- Founded: 1985
- University: Radford University
- Head coach: Alex Guerra (4th season)
- Conference: Big South Conference
- Location: Radford, Virginia
- Home stadium: Carter Memorial Stadium (Capacity: 800)
- Nickname: Highlanders
- Colors: Red, gray, and white

NCAA tournament appearances
- 2015, 2017

Conference tournament champions
- 2015, 2017

Conference regular season champions
- 2015

The Radford Highlanders baseball team is the varsity intercollegiate athletic team of the Radford University in Radford, Virginia, United States. The team competes in the National Collegiate Athletic Association's Division I and is a member of the Big South Conference, having served as a founding member in 1986.

== NCAA Tournament ==
Radford has played in the NCAA tournament twice.

Season	Region	Opponent	Result
2015	Nashville Regional	Indiana; Lipscomb; Indiana; Vanderbilt	L 1–7; W 5–2; W 5–3; L 0–21
2017	Louisville Regional	Louisville; Xavier	L 6–11; L 1–3
Totals	2–4	.333	
