= 2024 NCAA Division I baseball season =

2024 NCAA Division I season

- Duration: February 16 – June 24, 2024
- Number of teams: 300
- Preseason No. 1: Wake Forest

Tournament
- Duration: May 31–June 24

Men's College World Series
- Champions: Tennessee (1st title)
- Runners-up: Texas A&M (8th CWS Appearance)
- Winning coach: Tony Vitello (1st title)
- MOP: Dylan Dreiling, Tennessee

Seasons
- ← 2023 2025 →

The 2024 NCAA Division I baseball season was a college baseball season in the United States organized by the National Collegiate Athletic Association (NCAA) at the Division I level. It began on February 16, 2024, with play progressing through the regular season, various conference tournaments and championship series, and concluded with the 2024 NCAA Division I baseball tournament and 2024 Men's College World Series (MCWS). The MCWS, consisted of the eight remaining teams in the NCAA Tournament and held annually in Omaha, Nebraska at Charles Schwab Field Omaha, ended on June 24, 2024, with Tennessee winning the title.

== Realignment ==
Fifteen D-I baseball schools joined new conferences for the 2024 season, and one baseball-sponsoring school started a transition from NCAA Division II for the 2024 season.

- BYU, Cincinnati, Houston, and UCF joined the Big 12 Conference. BYU left the West Coast Conference, and the others left the American Athletic Conference (The American).
- Campbell left the Big South Conference for the Colonial Athletic Association, which adopted the new name of Coastal Athletic Association (CAA) after the 2023 baseball season.
- Charlotte, Florida Atlantic, Rice, UAB, and UTSA left Conference USA (CUSA) for The American.
- Jacksonville State, Liberty, New Mexico State, and Sam Houston joined CUSA. Jacksonville State and Liberty left the Atlantic Sun Conference (ASUN), and New Mexico State and Sam Houston the Western Athletic Conference.
- Le Moyne, previously a member of the D-II Northeast-10 Conference, joined the Northeast Conference (NEC).
- Western Illinois left the Summit League for the Ohio Valley Conference.

In addition to the above, Hartford, which had played the 2023 season as a Division I independent, joined the Commonwealth Coast Conference, now known as the Conference of New England, as part of the school's transition to NCAA Division III.

The 2024 season was the last for 18 baseball schools in their current conferences.

- All 11 baseball-sponsoring members of the Pac-12 Conference left for other conferences or became independent:
  - Arizona, Arizona State and Utah joined the Big 12 Conference.
  - California and Stanford joined the Atlantic Coast Conference.
  - Oregon, Washington, UCLA, and USC joined the Big Ten Conference.
  - Oregon State chose to compete as an independent.
  - Washington State became an affiliate of the Mountain West Conference.
- Kennesaw State left the ASUN for CUSA.
- Merrimack and Sacred Heart left the Northeast Conference for the Metro Atlantic Athletic Conference.
- Oklahoma and Texas left the Big 12 Conference for the Southeastern Conference.
- Stephen F. Austin and UTRGV left the Western Athletic Conference (WAC) for the Southland Conference.

In addition to the above:

- Two baseball-sponsoring Division II schools, Mercyhurst and West Georgia, announced they would start transitions to Division I after the 2024 season. Mercyhurst joined the NEC and West Georgia the ASUN.
- Delaware announced on November 28, 2023 that it would leave the CAA after the 2025 season to join CUSA.
- UMass announced on February 29, 2024 that it would leave the Atlantic 10 Conference (A-10) for the Mid-American Conference after the 2025 season.
- La Salle announced on April 16, 2024 that it would reinstate baseball in the 2026 season, returning to its primary home of the A-10. It had dropped the sport after the 2021 season.
- On May 10, 2024, three baseball schools announced they would change conferences after the 2025 season:
  - Grand Canyon and Seattle will leave the WAC for the West Coast Conference.
  - Missouri State will leave the Missouri Valley Conference and join CUSA alongside Delaware.

== Ballpark changes ==
- The 2024 season was the first for Marshall at Jack Cook Field, replacing GoMart Ballpark.

== Season outlook ==
ESPN/USA Today Coaches
Ranking	Team
1	Wake Forest (15)
2	LSU (11)
3	Florida (5)
4	Arkansas
5	TCU
6	Vanderbilt
7	Oregon State
8	Tennessee
9	Clemson
10	Texas A&M
11	Virginia
12	East Carolina
13	Texas
14	Duke
15	North Carolina
16	NC State
17	Alabama
18	UC Santa Barbara
19	Coastal Carolina
20	Iowa
21	South Carolina
22	Texas Tech
23	Stanford
24	UCLA
25	Northeastern

Perfect Game
Ranking	Team
1	Wake Forest
2	Arkansas
3	LSU
4	Florida
5	TCU
6	Vanderbilt
7	Texas A&M
8	Texas
9	Oregon State
10	Virginia
11	Tennessee
12	Stanford
13	South Carolina
14	North Carolina
15	Auburn
16	Iowa
17	East Carolina
18	UCLA
19	NC State
20	Kansas State
21	Clemson
22	Oklahoma State
23	Duke
24	UC Santa Barbara
25	Coastal Carolina

D1Baseball
Ranking	Team
1	Wake Forest
2	Florida
3	Arkansas
4	LSU
5	TCU
6	Vanderbilt
7	Oregon State
8	Texas A&M
9	Tennessee
10	Clemson
11	East Carolina
12	Duke
13	NC State
14	Virginia
15	North Carolina
16	Texas
17	UC Santa Barbara
18	Coastal Carolina
19	Alabama
20	Iowa
21	Texas Tech
22	UCLA
23	Northeastern
24	Kansas State
25	South Carolina

Baseball America
Ranking	Team
1	Wake Forest
2	LSU
3	Arkansas
4	Florida
5	Oregon State
6	TCU
7	Vanderbilt
8	Tennessee
9	Clemson
10	Virginia
11	Texas A&M
12	South Carolina
13	Texas
14	East Carolina
15	Stanford
16	Duke
17	North Carolina
18	Texas Tech
19	Coastal Carolina
20	Iowa
21	Oklahoma State
22	NC State
23	Auburn
24	Northeastern
25	UC Irvine

NCBWA
Ranking	Team
1	Wake Forest
2	LSU
3	Florida
4	Arkansas
5	Tennessee
6	TCU
7	Vanderbilt
8	Oregon State
9	Texas
10	Texas A&M
11	Virginia
12	Clemson
13	East Carolina
14	Duke
15	South Carolina
16	North Carolina
17	Stanford
18	NC State
19	Coastal Carolina
20	Texas Tech
21	Iowa
22	UCLA
23	Alabama
24	UC Santa Barbara
25	Auburn

== Conference standings ==
2024 America East Conference baseball standings
	Conf.						Overall
Team	W		L		T	PCT	W		L		T	PCT
Bryant ‍†‍‡‍^{y}	17	–	7	–	0	.708	36	–	21	–	0	.632
UMBC ‍‍‍	14	–	10	–	0	.583	27	–	25	–	0	.519
NJIT ‍‍‍	12	–	11	–	0	.522	26	–	28	–	0	.481
UMass Lowell ‍‍‍	11	–	12	–	0	.478	24	–	31	–	0	.436
Albany ‍‍‍	10	–	13	–	0	.435	15	–	34	–	1	.310
Binghamton ‍‍‍	10	–	14	–	0	.417	21	–	29	–	0	.420
Maine ‍‍‍	8	–	15	–	0	.348	12	–	37	–	0	.245
† – Conference champion ‡ – Tournament champion y – Invited to the NCAA tournament As of June 1, 2024; Rankings from D1Baseball

2024 American Athletic Conference baseball standings
	Conf.				Overall
Team	W		L	PCT	W		L	PCT
No. 14 East Carolina ‍†‍‍^{y}	19	–	8	.704	43	–	15	.741
UTSA ‍‍‍	17	–	10	.630	32	–	24	.571
Tulane ‍‍‡‍^{y}	15	–	12	.556	35	–	24	.593
Wichita State ‍‍‍	15	–	12	.556	32	–	29	.525
UAB ‍‍‍	13	–	14	.481	26	–	29	.473
Florida Atlantic ‍‍‍	12	–	15	.444	28	–	29	.491
Charlotte ‍‍‍	12	–	15	.444	24	–	34	.414
Rice ‍‍‍	11	–	16	.407	23	–	36	.390
South Florida ‍‍‍	11	–	16	.407	26	–	29	.473
Memphis ‍‍‍	10	–	17	.370	23	–	32	.418
† – Conference champion ‡ – Tournament champion y – Invited to the NCAA tournament As of May 26, 2024; Rankings from D1Baseball

2024 Atlantic 10 Conference baseball standings
	Conf.				Overall
Team	W		L	PCT	W		L	PCT
Saint Louis ‍†‍‍	16	–	8	.667	37	–	16	.698
VCU ‍‍‡‍^{y}	15	–	8	.652	37	–	21	.638
Dayton ‍‍‍	14	–	9	.609	33	–	22	.600
George Washington ‍‍‍	13	–	11	.542	31	–	26	.544
Saint Joseph's ‍‍‍	13	–	11	.542	29	–	26	.527
Richmond ‍‍‍	13	–	11	.542	27	–	32	.458
UMass ‍‍‍	13	–	11	.542	24	–	29	.453
Rhode Island ‍‍‍	11	–	13	.458	19	–	28	.404
Davidson ‍‍‍	10	–	14	.417	24	–	28	.462
Fordham ‍‍‍	10	–	14	.417	19	–	33	.365
St. Bonaventure ‍‍‍	8	–	16	.333	18	–	31	.367
George Mason ‍‍‍	7	–	17	.292	21	–	32	.396
† – Conference champion ‡ – Tournament champion y – Invited to the NCAA tournament As of May 25, 2024; Rankings from D1Baseball

2024 Atlantic Coast Conference baseball standings
	Conf.				Overall
Team	W		L	PCT	W		L	PCT
Atlantic
No. 9 Clemson ^{x}‍‍‍^{y}	20	–	10	.667	44	–	16	.733
No. 6 NC State ‍‍‍^{y}	18	–	11	.621	38	–	23	.623
No. 4 Florida State ‍‍‍^{y}	17	–	12	.586	49	–	17	.742
Louisville ‍‍‍	16	–	14	.533	32	–	24	.571
No. 19 Wake Forest ‍‍‍^{y}	15	–	15	.500	38	–	22	.633
Notre Dame ‍‍‍	9	–	21	.300	27	–	25	.519
Boston College ‍‍‍	8	–	22	.267	22	–	31	.415
Coastal
No. 5 North Carolina ^{x}‍‍‍^{y}	22	–	8	.733	48	–	16	.750
No. 7 Virginia ‍‍‍^{y}	18	–	12	.600	46	–	17	.730
No. 24 Duke ‍‍‡‍^{y}	16	–	14	.533	40	–	20	.667
Georgia Tech ‍‍‍^{y}	15	–	15	.500	33	–	25	.569
Virginia Tech ‍‍‍	14	–	16	.467	32	–	22	.593
Miami (FL) ‍‍‍	11	–	19	.367	26	–	30	.464
Pittsburgh ‍‍‍	10	–	20	.333	26	–	28	.481
x – Division champion ‡ – Tournament champion y – Invited to the NCAA Tournament; As of June 26, 2024; Rankings from D1Baseball

2024 ASUN Conference baseball standings
	Conf.						Overall
Team	W		L		T	PCT	W		L		T	PCT
Austin Peay ‍†‍‍	20	–	10	–	0	.667	36	–	21	–	0	.632
Stetson ‍†‍‡‍^{y}	20	–	10	–	0	.667	40	–	20	–	0	.667
Florida Gulf Coast ‍†‍‍	20	–	10	–	0	.667	30	–	26	–	0	.536
Kennesaw State ‍‍‍	19	–	10	–	0	.655	32	–	24	–	0	.571
Jacksonville ‍‍‍	18	–	12	–	0	.600	27	–	31	–	0	.466
Lipscomb ‍‍‍	15	–	15	–	0	.500	22	–	34	–	0	.393
Eastern Kentucky ‍‍‍	14	–	16	–	0	.467	20	–	37	–	0	.351
Central Arkansas ‍‍‍	12	–	18	–	0	.400	26	–	30	–	0	.464
North Florida ‍‍‍	11	–	17	–	1	.397	21	–	30	–	1	.413
North Alabama ‍‍‍	10	–	19	–	1	.350	18	–	35	–	1	.343
Queens* ‍‍‍	10	–	20	–	0	.333	14	–	41	–	0	.255
Bellarmine* ‍‍‍	9	–	21	–	0	.300	10	–	45	–	0	.182
† – Conference champion ‡ – Tournament champion y – Invited to the NCAA tournament * Ineligible for the 2024 NCAA tournament due to transition from Division II; As of May 26, 2024; Rankings from D1Baseball

2024 Big 12 Conference baseball standings
	Conf.				Overall
Team	W		L	PCT	W		L	PCT
No. 18 Oklahoma ‍†‍‍^{y}	23	–	7	.767	40	–	21	.656
No. 21 Oklahoma State ‍‍‡‍^{y}	19	–	9	.679	42	–	19	.689
Texas ‍‍‍^{y}	20	–	10	.667	36	–	24	.600
No. 13 West Virginia ‍‍‍^{y}	19	–	11	.633	36	–	24	.600
Cincinnati ‍‍‍	17	–	13	.567	32	–	25	.561
No. 14 Kansas State ‍‍‍^{y}	15	–	15	.500	35	–	26	.574
Kansas ‍‍‍	15	–	15	.500	31	–	23	.574
UCF ‍‍‍^{y}	14	–	15	.483	37	–	21	.638
TCU ‍‍‍	14	–	16	.467	33	–	21	.611
Texas Tech ‍‍‍	12	–	17	.414	33	–	26	.559
Baylor ‍‍‍	10	–	20	.333	22	–	31	.415
Houston ‍‍‍	7	–	21	.250	26	–	28	.481
BYU ‍‍‍	7	–	23	.233	21	–	31	.404
† – Conference champion ‡ – Tournament champion y – Invited to the NCAA tournament As of June 26, 2024; Rankings from D1baseball

2024 Big East Conference baseball standings
	Conf.						Overall
Team	W		L		T	PCT	W		L		T	PCT
UConn ‍†‍‍^{y}	17	–	4	–	0	.810	32	–	23	–	0	.582
St. John's ‍‍‡‍^{y}	14	–	7	–	0	.667	37	–	16	–	1	.694
Georgetown ‍‍‍	13	–	7	–	0	.650	36	–	21	–	0	.632
Xavier ‍‍‍	12	–	9	–	0	.571	30	–	27	–	0	.526
Villanova ‍‍‍	8	–	13	–	0	.381	18	–	33	–	0	.353
Creighton ‍‍‍	7	–	13	–	0	.350	35	–	17	–	0	.673
Seton Hall ‍‍‍	7	–	14	–	0	.333	24	–	30	–	0	.444
Butler ‍‍‍	5	–	16	–	0	.238	20	–	35	–	0	.364
† – Conference champion ‡ – Tournament champion y – Invited to the NCAA tournament As of May 25, 2024; Rankings from D1Baseball

2024 Big South Conference baseball standings
	Conf.						Overall
Team	W		L		T	PCT	W		L		T	PCT
Presbyterian ‍†‍‍	18	–	6	–	0	.750	29	–	27	–	0	.518
High Point ‍‍‡‍^{y}	17	–	7	–	0	.708	34	–	25	–	0	.576
USC Upstate ‍‍‍	16	–	8	–	0	.667	36	–	24	–	0	.600
Charleston Southern ‍‍‍	12	–	12	–	0	.500	22	–	32	–	0	.407
Longwood ‍‍‍	10	–	14	–	0	.417	23	–	29	–	0	.442
UNC Asheville ‍‍‍	10	–	14	–	0	.417	22	–	28	–	0	.440
Gardner-Webb ‍‍‍	9	–	15	–	0	.375	22	–	31	–	0	.415
Winthrop ‍‍‍	8	–	15	–	0	.348	19	–	29	–	1	.398
Radford ‍‍‍	7	–	16	–	0	.304	16	–	34	–	0	.320
† – Conference champion ‡ – Tournament champion y – Invited to the NCAA Tournament; As of May 25, 2024; Rankings from D1Baseball

2024 Big Ten Conference baseball standings
	Conf.						Overall
Team	W		L		T	PCT	W		L		T	PCT
Illinois ‍†‍‍^{y}	18	–	6	–	0	.750	35	–	21	–	0	.625
Nebraska ‍‍‡‍^{y}	16	–	8	–	0	.667	40	–	22	–	0	.645
Indiana ‍‍‍^{y}	15	–	9	–	0	.625	33	–	26	–	1	.558
Iowa ‍‍‍	14	–	10	–	0	.583	31	–	23	–	0	.574
Michigan ‍‍‍	14	–	10	–	0	.583	32	–	28	–	0	.533
Purdue ‍‍‍	13	–	11	–	0	.542	33	–	24	–	0	.579
Ohio State ‍‍‍	12	–	12	–	0	.500	29	–	26	–	0	.527
Penn State ‍‍‍	12	–	12	–	0	.500	29	–	24	–	0	.547
Minnesota ‍‍‍	11	–	13	–	0	.458	25	–	23	–	0	.521
Michigan State ‍‍‍	11	–	13	–	0	.458	24	–	27	–	0	.471
Maryland ‍‍‍	10	–	14	–	0	.417	34	–	22	–	0	.607
Rutgers ‍‍‍	6	–	18	–	0	.250	28	–	25	–	0	.528
Northwestern ‍‍‍	4	–	20	–	0	.167	18	–	34	–	0	.346
† – Conference champion ‡ – Tournament champion y – Invited to the NCAA tournament As of May 26, 2024; Rankings from D1Baseball

2024 Big West Conference baseball standings
	Conf.						Overall
Team	W		L		T	PCT	W		L		T	PCT
No. 19 UC Santa Barbara ‍†‍‍^{y}	26	–	4	–	0	.867	44	–	14	–	0	.759
No. 23 UC Irvine ‍‍‍^{y}	22	–	8	–	0	.733	45	–	14	–	0	.763
Hawai'i ‍‍‍	20	–	10	–	0	.667	37	–	16	–	0	.698
Cal Poly ‍‍‍	20	–	10	–	0	.667	35	–	22	–	0	.614
UC San Diego* ‍‍‍	17	–	13	–	0	.567	30	–	23	–	0	.566
Cal State Northridge ‍‍‍	16	–	14	–	0	.533	30	–	24	–	0	.556
UC Davis ‍‍‍	13	–	17	–	0	.433	29	–	27	–	0	.518
Long Beach State ‍‍‍	10	–	20	–	0	.333	25	–	29	–	1	.464
Cal State Bakersfield ‍‍‍	8	–	22	–	0	.267	15	–	38	–	0	.283
Cal State Fullerton ‍‍‍	7	–	23	–	0	.233	16	–	38	–	0	.296
UC Riverside ‍‍‍	6	–	24	–	0	.200	16	–	36	–	0	.308
† – Conference champion y – Invited to the NCAA tournament * Ineligible for the 2024 NCAA tournament due to transition from Division II; As of June 24, 2024; Rankings from D1Baseball

2024 Coastal Athletic Association baseball standings
	Conf.				Overall
Team	W		L	PCT	W		L	PCT
Charleston ‍†‍‍	21	–	5	.808	41	–	14	.745
UNC Wilmington ‍‍‡‍^{y}	20	–	7	.741	39	–	19	.672
Northeastern ‍‍‍	18	–	9	.667	38	–	17	.691
Delaware ‍‍‍	16	–	11	.593	31	–	26	.544
William & Mary ‍‍‍	13	–	14	.481	32	–	26	.552
Hofstra ‍‍‍	13	–	14	.481	24	–	33	.421
Campbell ‍‍‍	12	–	15	.444	31	–	22	.585
Stony Brook ‍‍‍	12	–	15	.444	24	–	28	.462
Monmouth ‍‍‍	11	–	16	.407	18	–	30	.375
Elon ‍‍‍	10	–	17	.370	21	–	32	.396
North Carolina A&T ‍‍‍	9	–	17	.346	25	–	28	.472
Towson ‍‍‍	5	–	20	.200	15	–	39	.278
† – Conference champion ‡ – Tournament champion y – Invited to the NCAA Tournament; As of May 26, 2024; Rankings from D1Baseball

2024 Conference USA baseball standings
	Conf.				Overall
Team	W		L	PCT	W		L	PCT
Louisiana Tech ‍†‍‍^{y}	18	–	6	.750	45	–	17	.726
No. 25 Dallas Baptist ‍‍‡‍^{y}	17	–	7	.708	44	–	13	.772
Western Kentucky ‍‍‍	15	–	9	.625	36	–	22	.621
Sam Houston ‍‍‍	13	–	11	.542	34	–	24	.586
Liberty ‍‍‍	11	–	13	.458	24	–	34	.414
FIU ‍‍‍	11	–	13	.458	27	–	30	.474
New Mexico State ‍‍‍	10	–	14	.417	25	–	29	.463
Middle Tennessee ‍‍‍	8	–	16	.333	20	–	36	.357
Jacksonville State ‍‍‍	5	–	19	.208	18	–	34	.346
† – Conference champion ‡ – Tournament champion y – Invited to the NCAA Tournament; As of May 26, 2024; Rankings from D1Baseball

2024 Horizon League baseball standings
	Conf.				Overall
Team	W		L	PCT	W		L	PCT
Wright State ‍†‍‍	20	–	10	.667	32	–	24	.571
Northern Kentucky ‍‍‡‍^{y}	19	–	11	.633	35	–	22	.614
Oakland ‍‍‍	18	–	12	.600	31	–	27	.534
Milwaukee ‍‍‍	13	–	17	.433	19	–	36	.345
Purdue Fort Wayne ‍‍‍	11	–	19	.367	19	–	37	.339
Youngstown State ‍‍‍	9	–	21	.300	16	–	44	.267
† – Conference champion ‡ – Tournament champion y – Invited to the NCAA Tournament; As of May 25, 2024; Rankings from D1Baseball

2024 Ivy League baseball standings
	Conf.				Overall
Team	W		L	PCT	W		L	PCT
Columbia ‍†‍‍	17	–	4	.810	26	–	18	.591
Princeton ‍‍‍	12	–	9	.571	18	–	26	.409
Cornell ‍‍‍	11	–	10	.524	17	–	21	.447
Penn ‍‍‡‍^{y}	11	–	10	.524	24	–	23	.511
Yale ‍‍‍	11	–	10	.524	18	–	23	.439
Harvard ‍‍‍	9	–	12	.429	13	–	26	.333
Dartmouth ‍‍‍	7	–	14	.333	13	–	26	.333
Brown ‍‍‍	6	–	15	.286	11	–	28	.282
† – Conference champion ‡ – Tournament champion y – Invited to the NCAA Tournament; As of May 20, 2024; Rankings from D1Baseball

2024 Metro Atlantic Athletic Conference baseball standings
	Conf.						Overall
Team	W		L		T	PCT	W		L		T	PCT
Fairfield ‍†‍‍	20	–	4	–	0	.833	34	–	24	–	0	.586
Niagara ‍†‍‡‍^{y}	20	–	4	–	0	.833	38	–	15	–	0	.717
Rider ‍‍‍	18	–	6	–	0	.750	28	–	23	–	0	.549
Mount St. Mary's ‍‍‍	13	–	11	–	0	.542	22	–	34	–	1	.395
Canisius ‍‍‍	11	–	13	–	0	.458	18	–	30	–	0	.375
Marist ‍‍‍	10	–	14	–	0	.417	19	–	35	–	0	.352
Manhattan ‍‍‍	10	–	14	–	0	.417	22	–	30	–	0	.423
Quinnipiac ‍‍‍	10	–	14	–	0	.417	20	–	30	–	0	.400
Siena ‍‍‍	8	–	16	–	0	.333	12	–	40	–	0	.231
Iona ‍‍‍	6	–	18	–	0	.250	12	–	38	–	0	.240
Saint Peter's ‍‍‍	6	–	18	–	0	.250	12	–	40	–	0	.231
† – Conference champion ‡ – Tournament champion y – Invited to the NCAA Tournament; As of May 25, 2024; Rankings from D1Baseball

2024 Mid-American Conference baseball standings
	Conf.						Overall
Team	W		L		T	PCT	W		L		T	PCT
Bowling Green ‍†‍‍	25	–	6	–	0	.806	33	–	20	–	0	.623
Western Michigan ‍‍‡‍^{y}	19	–	11	–	0	.633	32	–	21	–	0	.604
Ball State ‍‍‍	18	–	12	–	0	.600	35	–	23	–	1	.602
Miami (OH) ‍‍‍	17	–	13	–	0	.567	27	–	27	–	0	.500
Kent State ‍‍‍	16	–	13	–	0	.552	26	–	27	–	0	.491
Toledo ‍‍‍	16	–	15	–	0	.516	27	–	32	–	0	.458
Northern Illinois ‍‍‍	14	–	16	–	0	.467	21	–	33	–	0	.389
Ohio ‍‍‍	13	–	17	–	0	.433	18	–	32	–	0	.360
Akron ‍‍‍	10	–	19	–	0	.345	15	–	38	–	0	.283
Eastern Michigan ‍‍‍	9	–	21	–	0	.300	14	–	38	–	0	.269
Central Michigan ‍‍‍	8	–	22	–	0	.267	17	–	38	–	0	.309
† – Conference champion ‡ – Tournament champion y – Invited to the NCAA Tournament; As of May 25, 2024; Rankings from D1Baseball

2024 Missouri Valley Conference baseball standings
	Conf.						Overall
Team	W		L		T	PCT	W		L		T	PCT
Indiana State ‍†‍‍^{y}	22	–	5	–	0	.815	44	–	15	–	0	.746
Murray State ‍‍‍	17	–	10	–	0	.630	37	–	20	–	0	.649
No. 16 Evansville ‍‍‡‍^{y}	17	–	10	–	0	.630	39	–	26	–	0	.600
UIC ‍‍‍	16	–	11	–	0	.593	35	–	20	–	0	.636
Illinois State ‍‍‍	16	–	11	–	0	.593	30	–	27	–	0	.526
Southern Illinois ‍‍‍	12	–	15	–	0	.444	33	–	27	–	0	.550
Belmont ‍‍‍	12	–	15	–	0	.444	26	–	32	–	0	.448
Missouri State ‍‍‍	11	–	16	–	0	.407	23	–	34	–	0	.404
Valparaiso ‍‍‍	6	–	21	–	0	.222	14	–	38	–	0	.269
Bradley ‍‍‍	6	–	21	–	0	.222	13	–	37	–	1	.265
† – Conference champion ‡ – Tournament champion y – Invited to the NCAA Tournament; As of June 8, 2024; Rankings from D1Baseball

2024 Mountain West Conference baseball standings
	Conf.				Overall
Team	W		L	PCT	W		L	PCT
Air Force ‍†‍‍	18	–	12	.600	27	–	28	.491
New Mexico ‍‍‍	17	–	13	.567	28	–	26	.519
Fresno State ‍‍‡‍^{y}	16	–	14	.533	33	–	27	.550
Nevada ‍‍‍	16	–	14	.533	25	–	26	.490
San Jose State ‍‍‍	16	–	14	.533	24	–	32	.429
UNLV ‍‍‍	12	–	18	.400	26	–	26	.500
San Diego State ‍‍‍	10	–	20	.333	17	–	37	.315
† – Conference champion ‡ – Tournament champion y – Invited to the NCAA Tournament; As of May 26, 2024; Rankings from D1Baseball

2024 Northeast Conference baseball standings
	Conf.						Overall
Team	W		L		T	PCT	W		L		T	PCT
Sacred Heart ‍†‍‍	25	–	8	–	0	.758	35	–	23	–	0	.603
LIU ‍‍‡‍^{y}	24	–	9	–	0	.727	33	–	23	–	0	.589
Merrimack ‍‍‍	22	–	11	–	0	.667	33	–	26	–	0	.559
Wagner ‍‍‍	21	–	12	–	0	.636	26	–	30	–	0	.464
Delaware State ‍‍‍	20	–	13	–	0	.606	22	–	27	–	0	.449
Fairleigh Dickinson ‍‍‍	18	–	14	–	0	.563	26	–	30	–	0	.464
Central Connecticut ‍‍‍	17	–	15	–	0	.531	18	–	24	–	0	.429
Le Moyne ‍‍‍	15	–	17	–	0	.469	22	–	27	–	1	.450
Stonehill ‍‍‍	13	–	17	–	0	.433	18	–	29	–	0	.383
Coppin State ‍‍‍	11	–	21	–	0	.344	12	–	33	–	0	.267
Norfolk State ‍‍‍	7	–	26	–	0	.212	12	–	41	–	0	.226
Maryland Eastern Shore ‍‍‍	0	–	30	–	0	.000	0	–	48	–	0	.000
† – Conference champion ‡ – Tournament champion y – Invited to the NCAA Tournament; As of May 26, 2024; Rankings from D1Baseball

2024 Ohio Valley Conference baseball standings
	Conf.						Overall
Team	W		L		T	PCT	W		L		T	PCT
Little Rock ‍†‍‍	19	–	8	–	0	.704	32	–	24	–	0	.571
Southeast Missouri State ‍‍‡‍^{y}	18	–	9	–	0	.667	34	–	25	–	0	.576
Morehead State ‍‍‍	17	–	10	–	0	.630	37	–	24	–	0	.607
Southern Indiana ‍‍‍	14	–	13	–	0	.519	27	–	32	–	0	.458
Tennessee Tech ‍‍‍	13	–	14	–	0	.481	29	–	26	–	0	.527
Eastern Illinois ‍‍‍	13	–	14	–	0	.481	20	–	33	–	0	.377
SIU Edwardsville ‍‍‍	12	–	15	–	0	.444	21	–	34	–	1	.384
UT Martin ‍‍‍	12	–	15	–	0	.444	21	–	35	–	0	.375
Lindenwood ‍‍‍	9	–	18	–	0	.333	16	–	38	–	0	.296
Western Illinois ‍‍‍	8	–	19	–	0	.296	13	–	37	–	0	.260
† – Conference champion ‡ – Tournament champion y – Invited to the NCAA Tournament; As of May 25, 2024; Rankings from D1Baseball

2024 Pac-12 Conference baseball standings
	Conf.						Overall
Team	W		L		T	PCT	W		L		T	PCT
No. 25 Arizona ‍†‍‡‍^{y}	20	–	10	–	0	.667	36	–	23	–	0	.610
No. 10 Oregon State ‍‍‍^{y}	19	–	10	–	0	.655	42	–	14	–	0	.750
No. 12 Oregon ‍‍‍^{y}	19	–	11	–	0	.633	37	–	18	–	0	.673
USC ‍‍‍	17	–	12	–	0	.586	31	–	28	–	0	.525
California ‍‍‍	17	–	13	–	0	.567	36	–	19	–	0	.655
Arizona State ‍‍‍	17	–	13	–	0	.567	32	–	26	–	0	.552
Utah ‍‍‍	16	–	14	–	0	.533	33	–	22	–	0	.600
Stanford ‍‍‍	11	–	19	–	0	.367	22	–	32	–	0	.407
Washington ‍‍‍	10	–	20	–	0	.333	19	–	31	–	1	.382
Washington State ‍‍‍	9	–	21	–	0	.300	21	–	32	–	0	.396
UCLA ‍‍‍	9	–	21	–	0	.300	19	–	33	–	0	.365
† – Conference champion ‡ – Tournament champion y – Invited to the NCAA Tournament; As of May 25, 2024; Rankings from D1Baseball

2024 Patriot League baseball standings
	Conf.						Overall
Team	W		L		T	PCT	W		L		T	PCT
Army ‍†‍‡‍^{y}	16	–	8	–	0	.667	31	–	21	–	0	.596
Navy ‍‍‍	15	–	10	–	0	.600	28	–	23	–	0	.549
Holy Cross ‍‍‍	14	–	11	–	0	.560	26	–	27	–	0	.491
Bucknell ‍‍‍	12	–	13	–	0	.480	22	–	24	–	0	.478
Lehigh ‍‍‍	9	–	16	–	0	.360	24	–	23	–	1	.510
Lafayette ‍‍‍	8	–	16	–	0	.333	14	–	35	–	0	.286
† – Conference champion ‡ – Tournament champion y – Invited to the NCAA Tournament; As of May 20, 2024; Rankings from D1Baseball

2024 Southeastern Conference baseball standings
	Conf.				Overall
Team	W		L	PCT	W		L	PCT
Eastern
No. 1 Tennessee ^{x}‍†‍‡‍^{y}	22	–	8	.733	60	–	13	.822
No. 3 Kentucky ^{x}‍†‍‍^{y}	22	–	8	.733	46	–	16	.742
No. 11 Georgia ‍‍‍^{y}	17	–	13	.567	43	–	17	.717
Vanderbilt ‍‍‍^{y}	13	–	17	.433	38	–	23	.623
No. 8 Florida ‍‍‍^{y}	13	–	17	.433	36	–	30	.545
South Carolina ‍‍‍^{y}	13	–	17	.433	37	–	25	.597
Missouri ‍‍‍	9	–	21	.300	23	–	32	.418
Western
No. 17 Arkansas ^{x}‍‍‍^{y}	20	–	10	.667	44	–	16	.733
No. 2 Texas A&M ‍‍‍^{y}	19	–	11	.633	53	–	15	.779
No. 22 Mississippi State ‍‍‍^{y}	17	–	13	.567	40	–	23	.635
Alabama ‍‍‍^{y}	13	–	17	.433	33	–	24	.579
LSU ‍‍‍^{y}	13	–	17	.433	43	–	23	.652
Ole Miss ‍‍‍	11	–	19	.367	27	–	29	.482
Auburn ‍‍‍	8	–	22	.267	27	–	26	.509
x – Division champion † – Conference champion ‡ – Tournament champion y – Invited to the NCAA Tournament; As of June 24, 2024; Rankings from D1Baseball

2024 Southern Conference baseball standings
	Conf.				Overall
Team	W		L	PCT	W		L	PCT
UNC Greensboro ‍†‍‍	15	–	6	.714	33	–	21	.611
Samford ‍‍‍	14	–	7	.667	36	–	22	.621
East Tennessee State ‍‍‍	13	–	8	.619	36	–	20	.643
Western Carolina ‍‍‍	13	–	8	.619	28	–	26	.519
Wofford ‍‍‡‍^{y}	12	–	8	.600	41	–	18	.695
VMI ‍‍‍	7	–	14	.333	27	–	29	.482
Mercer ‍‍‍	6	–	14	.300	29	–	29	.500
The Citadel ‍‍‍	3	–	18	.143	21	–	32	.396
† – Conference champion ‡ – Tournament champion y – Invited to the NCAA tournament As of May 26, 2024; Rankings from D1Baseball

2024 Southland Conference baseball standings
	Conf.				Overall
Team	W		L	PCT	W		L	PCT
Lamar ‍†‍‍	17	–	7	.708	44	–	15	.746
Nicholls ‍‍‡‍^{y}	16	–	8	.667	38	–	22	.633
New Orleans ‍‍‍	14	–	10	.583	31	–	26	.544
McNeese ‍‍‍	11	–	13	.458	32	–	27	.542
Northwestern State ‍‍‍	11	–	13	.458	22	–	33	.400
Southeastern Louisiana ‍‍‍	10	–	14	.417	30	–	28	.517
Texas A&M–Corpus Christi ‍‍‍	10	–	14	.417	22	–	35	.386
Incarnate Word ‍‍‍	10	–	14	.417	26	–	31	.456
Houston Christian ‍‍‍	9	–	15	.375	18	–	31	.367
† – Conference champion ‡ – Tournament champion y – Invited to the NCAA Tournament; As of June 1, 2024; Rankings from D1Baseball

2024 Southwestern Athletic Conference baseball standings
	Conf.				Overall
Team	W		L	PCT	W		L	PCT
East
Florida A&M ^{x}‍‍‍	22	–	8	.733	29	–	27	.518
Bethune–Cookman ‍‍‍	19	–	10	.655	32	–	27	.542
Jackson State ‍‍‍	17	–	11	.607	36	–	20	.643
Alabama State ‍‍‍	17	–	12	.586	29	–	27	.518
Alabama A&M ‍‍‍	9	–	20	.310	14	–	37	.275
Mississippi Valley State ‍‍‍	4	–	26	.133	10	–	32	.238
West
Texas Southern ^{x}‍‍‍	17	–	6	.739	22	–	25	.468
Grambling State ‍‍‡‍^{y}	17	–	7	.708	25	–	25	.500
Prairie View A&M ‍‍‍	18	–	9	.667	29	–	26	.527
Southern ‍‍‍	15	–	12	.556	20	–	29	.408
Arkansas–Pine Bluff ‍‍‍	6	–	21	.222	14	–	35	.286
Alcorn State ‍‍‍	5	–	24	.172	6	–	42	.125
x – Division champion ‡ – Tournament champion y – Invited to the NCAA Tournament; As of May 26, 2024; Rankings from Collegiate Baseball

2024 Summit League baseball standings
	Conf.						Overall
Team	W		L		T	PCT	W		L		T	PCT
St. Thomas* ‍†‍‍	16	–	10	–	0	.615	22	–	23	–	0	.489
Omaha ‍‍‍	16	–	13	–	1	.550	18	–	32	–	1	.363
North Dakota State ‍‍‍	14	–	12	–	1	.537	20	–	30	–	1	.402
Oral Roberts ‍‍‡‍^{y}	13	–	15	–	1	.466	27	–	30	–	1	.474
Northern Colorado ‍‍‍	13	–	16	–	1	.450	14	–	36	–	1	.284
South Dakota State ‍‍‍	11	–	17	–	0	.393	20	–	29	–	0	.408
† – Conference champion ‡ – Tournament champion y – Invited to the NCAA Tournament * Ineligible for the 2024 NCAA tournament due to transition from Division III; As of May 25, 2024; Rankings from D1Baseball

2024 Sun Belt Conference baseball standings
	Conf.						Overall
Team	W		L		T	PCT	W		L		T	PCT
No. 22 Louisiana ‍†‍‍^{y}	23	–	7	–	0	.767	40	–	18	–	0	.690
No. 23 Southern Miss ‍‍‡‍^{y}	20	–	10	–	0	.667	40	–	18	–	0	.690
Troy ‍‍‍	18	–	12	–	0	.600	37	–	22	–	0	.627
James Madison ‍‍‍^{y}	17	–	13	–	0	.567	34	–	23	–	0	.596
Georgia Southern ‍‍‍	17	–	13	–	0	.567	33	–	25	–	0	.569
Appalachian State ‍‍‍	16	–	13	–	1	.550	33	–	21	–	1	.609
Coastal Carolina ‍‍‍^{y}	16	–	14	–	0	.533	34	–	23	–	0	.596
Old Dominion ‍‍‍	15	–	15	–	0	.500	31	–	26	–	0	.544
South Alabama ‍‍‍	14	–	16	–	0	.467	31	–	24	–	0	.564
Texas State ‍‍‍	13	–	17	–	0	.433	27	–	29	–	0	.482
Georgia State ‍‍‍	13	–	17	–	0	.433	25	–	32	–	0	.439
Louisiana–Monroe ‍‍‍	11	–	19	–	0	.367	25	–	30	–	0	.455
Marshall ‍‍‍	9	–	21	–	0	.300	18	–	37	–	0	.327
Arkansas State ‍‍‍	7	–	22	–	1	.250	21	–	32	–	1	.398
† – Conference champion ‡ – Tournament champion y – Invited to the NCAA Tournament; As of May 26, 2024; Rankings from D1Baseball

2024 West Coast Conference baseball standings
	Conf.				Overall
Team	W		L	PCT	W		L	PCT
San Diego ‍†‍‡‍^{y}	20	–	4	.833	40	–	13	.755
Portland ‍‍‍	19	–	5	.792	37	–	19	.661
Saint Mary's ‍‍‍	16	–	8	.667	34	–	22	.607
Gonzaga ‍‍‍	14	–	10	.583	21	–	32	.396
Santa Clara ‍‍‍	12	–	12	.500	26	–	26	.500
Loyola Marymount ‍‍‍	9	–	15	.375	24	–	30	.444
Pepperdine ‍‍‍	9	–	15	.375	15	–	38	.283
Pacific ‍‍‍	5	–	19	.208	11	–	44	.200
San Francisco ‍‍‍	4	–	20	.167	21	–	34	.382
† – Conference champion ‡ – Tournament champion y – Invited to the NCAA Tournament; As of May 25, 2024; Rankings from D1Baseball

2024 Western Athletic Conference baseball standings
	Conf.				Overall
Team	W		L	PCT	W		L	PCT
Grand Canyon ‍†‍‍^{y}	23	–	7	.767	34	–	23	.596
Abilene Christian ‍‍‍	18	–	12	.600	33	–	25	.569
California Baptist ‍‍‍	18	–	12	.600	37	–	25	.597
Utah Valley ‍‍‍	18	–	12	.600	29	–	29	.500
Tarleton* ‍‍‡‍	17	–	14	.548	32	–	29	.525
UT Arlington ‍‍‍	16	–	14	.533	22	–	34	.393
UT Rio Grande Valley ‍‍‍	15	–	15	.500	29	–	25	.537
Sacramento State ‍‍‍	14	–	16	.467	26	–	31	.456
Seattle ‍‍‍	10	–	20	.333	17	–	36	.321
Utah Tech* ‍‍‍	10	–	20	.333	14	–	42	.250
Stephen F. Austin ‍‍‍	6	–	24	.200	10	–	44	.185
† – Conference champion ‡ – Tournament champion y – Invited to the NCAA Tournament * Ineligible for the 2024 NCAA tournament due to transition from Division II; As of May 25, 2024; Rankings from D1Baseball

=== Conference winners and tournaments ===
Thirty athletic conferences each end their regular seasons with a single-elimination tournament or a double-elimination tournament. The teams in each conference that win their regular season title are given the number one seed in each tournament. The winners of these tournaments receive automatic invitations to the 2024 NCAA Division I baseball tournament.

Conference	Regular Season Winner	Conference Player of the Year	Conference Pitcher of the Year	Conference Coach of the Year	Conference Tournament	Tournament Venue (City)	Tournament Winner
America East Conference	Bryant	Gavin Noriega, Bryant	Luke Johnson, UMBC	Ryan Klosterman, Bryant	2024 America East Conference baseball tournament	Baseball Complex • Vestal, NY	Bryant
American Athletic Conference	East Carolina	Carter Cunningham, East Carolina	Trey Yesavage, East Carolina	Cliff Godwin, East Carolina	2024 American Athletic Conference baseball tournament	BayCare Ballpark • Clearwater, FL	Tulane
Atlantic 10 Conference	Saint Louis	Brandon Eike, VCU	Nick Wissman, Dayton	Darin Hendrickson, Saint Louis	2024 Atlantic 10 Conference baseball tournament	Capital One Park • Tysons, VA	VCU
Atlantic Coast Conference	Atlantic - Clemson; Coastal - North Carolina (Note: Top seed in conference tournament.)	James Tibbs III, Florida State	Chase Burns, Wake Forest	Scott Forbes, North Carolina	2024 Atlantic Coast Conference baseball tournament	Truist Field • Charlotte, NC	Duke
Atlantic Sun Conference	Austin Peay; Florida Gulf Coast; Stetson	Lyle Miller-Green, Austin Peay	Jesse Barker, Central Arkansas	Roland Fanning, Austin Peay	2024 Atlantic Sun Conference baseball tournament	Melching Field at Conrad Park • DeLand, FL	Stetson
Big 12 Conference	Oklahoma	Max Belyeu, Texas	Payton Tolle, TCU	Skip Johnson, Oklahoma	2024 Big 12 Conference baseball tournament	Globe Life Field • Arlington, TX	Oklahoma State
Big East Conference	UConn	Christian Ficca, Georgetown	Ian Cooke, UConn	St. John's (Mike Hampton, head coach (Note: The Big East's end-of-season coaching award is officially styled as the "Coaching Staff of the Year" award and is presented to the entire honored staff. The head coach is specifically named in the award announcement.)	2024 Big East Conference baseball tournament	Prasco Park • Mason, OH	St. John's
Big South Conference	Presbyterian	Joel Dragoo, Presbyterian	Daniel Eagen, Presbyterian	Elton Pollock, Presbyterian	2024 Big South Conference baseball tournament	Truist Point • High Point, NC	High Point
Big Ten Conference	Illinois	Josh Kuroda-Grauer, Rutgers	Brett Sears, Nebraska	Dan Hartleb, Illinois	2024 Big Ten baseball tournament	Charles Schwab Field Omaha • Omaha, NE	Nebraska
Big West Conference	UC Santa Barbara	Myles Smith, UC Irvine	Ryan Gallagher, UC Santa Barbara	Andrew Checketts, UC Santa Barbara	No tournament; regular-season champion earns auto bid		
Coastal Athletic Association	Charleston	Tyler MacGregor, Northeastern & Tanner Thach, UNCW	Nate Knowles, William & Mary	Chad Holbrook, Charleston	2024 Coastal Athletic Association baseball tournament	Brooks Field • Wilmington, NC	UNC Wilmington
Conference USA	Louisiana Tech	Ethan Bates, Louisiana Tech	Ryan Johnson, Dallas Baptist	Dan Heefner, Dallas Baptist & Lane Burroughs, Louisiana Tech	2024 Conference USA baseball tournament	J. C. Love Field at Pat Patterson Park • Ruston, LA	Dallas Baptist
Horizon League	Wright State	Liam McFadden-Ackman, Northern Kentucky	SP: Brandon Decker, Oakland; RP: Kevin Fee, Purdue Fort Wayne (Note: The Horizon League's Pitcher of the Year award specifically honors starting pitchers. The conference presents a separate Relief Pitcher of the Year award.)	Dizzy Peyton, Northern Kentucky & Alex Sogard, Wright State	2024 Horizon League baseball tournament	Hosted by regular-season champion	Northern Kentucky
Ivy League	Columbia	Wyatt Henseler, Penn	Callan Fang, Harvard	Brett Boretti, Columbia	2024 Ivy League baseball championship series	Robertson Field at Satow Stadium • New York, NY	Penn
Metro Atlantic Athletic Conference	Fairfield; Niagara	Eric Rataczak, Niagara	Colin McVeigh, Fairfield	Rob McCoy, Niagara	2024 Metro Atlantic Athletic Conference baseball tournament	Clover Stadium • Pomona, NY	Niagara
Mid-American Conference	Bowling Green	Nathan Archer, Bowling Green	Merritt Beeker, Ball State	Kyle Hallock, Bowling Green	2024 Mid-American Conference baseball tournament	Mercy Health Stadium • Avon, OH	Western Michigan
Missouri Valley Conference	Indiana State	Kendal Ewell, UIC	Brennyn Cutts, Indiana State	Mitch Hannahs, Indiana State	2024 Missouri Valley Conference baseball tournament	Charles H. Braun Stadium • Evansville, IN	Evansville
Mountain West Conference	Air Force	Jay Thomason, Air Force & Jake Holland, New Mexico	Seungmin Shim, Air Force	Mike Kazlausky, Air Force	2024 Mountain West Conference baseball tournament	Tony Gwynn Stadium • San Diego, CA	Fresno State
Northeast Conference	Sacred Heart	Evan Bouldin, Delaware State	Kieran Etwaru, Delaware State	Pat Egan, Sacred Heart	2024 Northeast Conference baseball tournament	Heritage Financial Park • Fishkill, NY	LIU
Ohio Valley Conference	Little Rock	Roman Kuntz, Morehead State	Jacob Weatherley, Little Rock	Chris Curry, Little Rock	2024 Ohio Valley Conference baseball tournament	Marion Stadium • Marion, IL	Southeast Missouri State
Pac-12 Conference	Arizona	Travis Bazzana, Oregon State	Bryson Van Sickle, Utah	Chip Hale, Arizona	2024 Pac-12 Conference baseball tournament	Scottsdale Stadium • Scottsdale, AZ	Arizona
Patriot League	Army	Sean Keys, Bucknell	Justin Lehman, Army	Ed Kahovec, Holy Cross	2024 Patriot League baseball tournament	Campus sites	Army
Southeastern Conference	Eastern – Kentucky; Tennessee; Western – Arkansas	Charlie Condon, Georgia	Hagen Smith, Arkansas	Nick Mingione, Kentucky	2024 Southeastern Conference baseball tournament	Hoover Metropolitan Stadium • Hoover, AL	Tennessee
Southern Conference	UNC Greensboro	Caleb Cozart, UNC Greensboro	Michael Ross, Samford	Cody Ellis, UNC Greensboro	2024 Southern Conference baseball tournament	Fluor Field at the West End • Greenville, SC	Wofford
Southland Conference	Lamar	Edgar Alvarez Nicholls	Brooks Caple Lamar	Will Davis Lamar	2024 Southland Conference baseball tournament	Pat Kenelly Diamond at Alumni Field • Hammond, LA	Nicholls
Southwestern Athletic Conference	East - Florida A&M; West - Texas Southern	Ali LaPread, Alabama State	Caleb Granger, Florida A&M	Jamey Shouppe, Florida A&M & Michael Robertson, Texas Southern	2024 Southwestern Athletic Conference baseball tournament	Russ Chandler Stadium • Atlanta, GA	Grambling State
The Summit League	St. Thomas (Note: St. Thomas ineligible due to transition from NCAA Division III, Omaha top seed in tournament)	Cael Frost; South Dakota State	Jakob Hall; Oral Roberts	Evan Porter; Omaha	2024 Summit League baseball tournament	J. L. Johnson Stadium • Tulsa, OK	Oral Roberts
Sun Belt Conference	Louisiana	Kyle DeBarge, Louisiana	LP Langevin, Louisiana	Matt Deggs, Louisiana	2024 Sun Belt Conference baseball tournament	Montgomery Riverwalk Stadium • Montgomery, AL	Southern Miss
West Coast Conference	San Diego	Jakob Christian, San Diego	Carter Gaston, Portland	Brock Ungricht, San Diego	2024 West Coast Conference baseball tournament	Las Vegas Ballpark • Las Vegas, NV	San Diego
Western Athletic Conference	Grand Canyon	Tyler Wilson, Grand Canyon	Brett Lanman, Abilene Christian	Gregg Wallis, Grand Canyon	2024 Western Athletic Conference baseball tournament	Hohokam Stadium • Mesa, AZ	Tarleton (Note: Tarleton ineligible for the NCAA tournament due to transition from NCAA Division II, Grand Canyon received tournament berth)

== Award winners ==
Award	Player	Position	School
Golden Spikes Award	Charlie Condon	1B/OF	Georgia
Dick Howser Trophy	Charlie Condon	1B/OF	Georgia
Bobby Bragan Collegiate Slugger Award	Charlie Condon	1B/OF	Georgia
Baseball America College Player of the Year Award	Charlie Condon	1B/OF	Georgia
National Pitcher of the Year Award	Hagen Smith	P	Arkansas
Buster Posey Award	Walker Janek	C	Sam Houston State
Brooks Wallace Award	Griff O'Ferrall	SS	Virginia
John Olerud Award	Jac Caglianone	1B/DH/P	Florida
Stopper of the Year Award	Evan Aschenbeck	RP	Texas A&M
College World Series Most Outstanding Player	Dylan Dreiling	OF	Tennessee

== Coaching changes ==
This table lists programs that changed head coaches at any point from the first day of the 2024 season until the day before the first day of the 2025 season.

Team	Former coach	Interim coach	New coach	Reason
Alabama A&M	Elliot Jones	Louis Whitlow		Resigned
Alcorn State	Reggie Williams		Carlton Hardy	Fired
Arkansas–Pine Bluff	Carlos James		Logan Stout	Resigned
Arkansas State	Tommy Raffo		Mike Silva	Fired
Bellarmine	Chris Dominguez		Ben Reel	Became assistant coach at Miami (FL)
Cal State Bakersfield	Jeremy Beard		Jordon Banfield	Fired
Campbell	Justin Haire		Chris Marx	Became head coach at Ohio State
Charleston Southern	Marc MacMillan		Karl Kuhn	Fired
The Citadel	Tony Skole		Russell Triplett	Mutually agreed to part ways
Coastal Carolina	Gary Gilmore		Kevin Schnall	Retired at end of 2024 season
Dayton	Jayson King		Scott Loiseau	Became assistant coach at Vanderbilt
Delaware State	J. P. Blandin		Pedro Swann	Retired
Eastern Kentucky	Chris Prothro		Walt Jones	Resigned
Houston Christian	Lance Berkman		Clay VanderLaan	Resigned
Indiana State	Mitch Hannahs		Tracy Archuleta	Became head coach at South Florida
Liberty	Scott Jackson		Bradley LeCroy	Became assistant coach at North Carolina
Longwood	Chad Oxendine		Ray Noe	Became associate head coach at Coastal Carolina
Manhattan	David Miller	Steven Rosen		Became head coach at La Salle
Minnesota	John Anderson		Ty McDevitt	Retired at end of 2024 season
Missouri State	Keith Guttin		Joey Hawkins	Retired at end of 2024 season
Morehead State	Brady Ward		Chris Rose	Resigned
New Orleans	Blake Dean	Dax Norris	Andrew Gipson	Resigned
Niagara	Rob McCoy		Matt Spatafora	Became head coach at William & Mary
Nicholls	Mike Silva		Brent Haring	Became head coach at Arkansas State
Oakland	Jordon Banfield	Brian Nelson		Became head coach at Bakersfield
Ohio State	Bill Mosiello		Justin Haire	Became assistant coach at TCU
Pacific	Chris Rodriguez		Reed Peters	Fired
Pepperdine	Rick Hirtensteiner		Tyler LaTorre	Contract not renewed
Rider	Barry Davis	Lee Lipinski		Resigned
South Carolina	Mark Kingston		Paul Mainieri	Fired
South Florida	Billy Mohl		Mitch Hannahs	Fired
Southern Indiana	Tracy Archuleta		Chris Ramirez	Became head coach at Indiana State
Stephen F. Austin	Johnny Cardenas		Matt Vanderburg	Retired
Texas	David Pierce		Jim Schlossnagle	Mutually agreed to part ways
Texas A&M	Jim Schlossnagle		Michael Earley	Became head coach at Texas
USC Upstate	Mike McGuire		Kane Sweeney	Became head coach at Winthrop
UT Arlington	Clay Van Hook		Mike Trapasso	Became recruiting coordinator at Houston
Utah Valley	Eddie Smith		Nate Rasmussen	Became head coach at Washington
VCU	Bradley LeCroy		Sean Thompson	Became head coach at Liberty
Washington	Jason Kelly		Eddie Smith	Became pitching coach at Texas A&M
West Virginia	Randy Mazey		Steve Sabins	Retired at end of 2024 season
William & Mary	Mike McRae		Rob McCoy	Contract not renewed
Winthrop	Tom Riginos		Mike McGuire	Contract not renewed
Youngstown State	Dan Bertolini		Trevor Charpie	Fired

== See also ==
- 2024 NCAA Division I softball season
