= 2024 UT Arlington Mavericks baseball team =

American college baseball season

2024 UT Arlington Mavericks baseball
- Conference: Western Athletic Conference
- Record: 22–34 (16–14 WAC)
- Head coach: Clay Van Hook (2nd season)
- Assistant coaches: Mike Trapasso; Mike Taylor; Ben Breazeale
- Home stadium: Clay Gould Ballpark

2024 Western Athletic Conference baseball standings
	Conf.				Overall
Team	W		L	PCT	W		L	PCT
Grand Canyon ‍†‍‍^{y}	23	–	7	.767	34	–	23	.596
Abilene Christian ‍‍‍	18	–	12	.600	33	–	25	.569
California Baptist ‍‍‍	18	–	12	.600	37	–	25	.597
Utah Valley ‍‍‍	18	–	12	.600	29	–	29	.500
Tarleton* ‍‍‡‍	17	–	14	.548	32	–	29	.525
UT Arlington ‍‍‍	16	–	14	.533	22	–	34	.393
UT Rio Grande Valley ‍‍‍	15	–	15	.500	29	–	25	.537
Sacramento State ‍‍‍	14	–	16	.467	26	–	31	.456
Seattle ‍‍‍	10	–	20	.333	17	–	36	.321
Utah Tech* ‍‍‍	10	–	20	.333	14	–	42	.250
Stephen F. Austin ‍‍‍	6	–	24	.200	10	–	44	.185
† – Conference champion ‡ – Tournament champion y – Invited to the NCAA Tournament * Ineligible for the 2024 NCAA tournament due to transition from Division II; As of May 25, 2024; Rankings from D1Baseball

The 2024 UT Arlington Mavericks baseball team represented the University of Texas at Arlington during the 2024 NCAA Division I baseball season. The Mavericks played their home games at Clay Gould Ballpark and were led by second-year head coach Clay Van Hook. They were members of the Western Athletic Conference.

== Preseason ==
=== Western Athletic Conference Coaches Poll ===
The Western Athletic Conference Coaches Poll was released on February 6, 2024. UT Arlington was picked to finish fifth with 68 votes.

Coaches poll
Predicted finish	Team	Votes (1st place)
1	Grand Canyon	99 (9)
2	Utah Valley	75 (1)
3	California Baptist	74 (1)
4	Abilene Christian	70
5	UT Arlington	68
6	UTRGV	59
7	Sacramento State	54
8	Seattle U	39
9	Tarleton State	34
10	Stephen F. Austin	19
11	Utah Tech	16

== Personnel ==
2024 UT Arlington Mavericks baseball team
Players
Coaches

#	Pos.	Name	B/T	Height	Weight	Year	Home town
0	RHP	Tate Bethel	R/R	6 ft 1 in (1.85 m)	195 lb (88 kg)	Jr	Sherman, Texas
2		Cason Gregory (redshirt)	R/R	5 ft 11 in (1.8 m)	170 lb (77 kg)	Jr	Cleburne, Texas
3	INF	Kyzer Harrington	R/R	6 ft 0 in (1.83 m)	165 lb (75 kg)	Fr	Midlothian, Texas
4	OF	Zach Henry (redshirt)	L/R	6 ft 0 in (1.83 m)	195 lb (88 kg)	Jr	Rockwall, Texas
6		Cade Sumbler (redshirt)	R/R	5 ft 11 in (1.8 m)	180 lb (82 kg)	Jr	Midlothian, Texas
7	INF	William Johnson	R/R	6 ft 1 in (1.85 m)	170 lb (77 kg)	Fr	Plano, Texas
9	RHP	Caylon Dygert	R/R	6 ft 1 in (1.85 m)	195 lb (88 kg)	Fr	Magnolia, Texas
10	C	Parker Airhart	R/R	6 ft 0 in (1.83 m)	210 lb (95 kg)	Jr	Sugar Land, Texas
11	INF	Tyce Armstrong (redshirt)	R/R	6 ft 4 in (1.93 m)	220 lb (100 kg)	So	Conroe, Texas
12	RHP	Zach Norris (redshirt)	R/R	6 ft 1 in (1.85 m)	200 lb (91 kg)	Sr	Paris, Texas
13	INF	Ryan Black	L/R	6 ft 1 in (1.85 m)	195 lb (88 kg)	So	Grand Prairie, Texas
14	OF	Jackson Hill	L/R	6 ft 2 in (1.88 m)	170 lb (77 kg)	Fr	Keller, Texas
15	OF	Garrison Berkley (redshirt)	R/R	6 ft 2 in (1.88 m)	195 lb (88 kg)	Jr	Aledo, Texas
16	RHP	Nicholas Robb	R/R	6 ft 3 in (1.91 m)	175 lb (79 kg)	Fr	Keller, Texas
17	RHP	Matt Hudspeth	R/R	6 ft 3 in (1.91 m)	180 lb (82 kg)	Fr	Arlington, Texas
18	LHP	Austin Wallace (redshirt)	L/L	6 ft 4 in (1.93 m)	220 lb (100 kg)	Jr	Flower Mound, Texas
20	RHP	Jason Scrantom	R/R	6 ft 3 in (1.91 m)	215 lb (98 kg)	Jr	Sachse, Texas
21	RHP	Garrett Gearner (redshirt)	R/R	6 ft 4 in (1.93 m)	180 lb (82 kg)	So	Winnsboro, Texas
22	OF	Tyson Pointer	R/R	6 ft 1 in (1.85 m)	200 lb (91 kg)	Sr	Dallas, Texas
23	INF	Jordan Medellin (redshirt)	/	6 ft 1 in (1.85 m)	—	Fr	League City, Texas
24	LHP	Dante Cano (redshirt)	L/L	6 ft 4 in (1.93 m)	180 lb (82 kg)	Fr	Abilene, Texas
25	INF	Ryan Ellis (redshirt)	L/R	5 ft 9 in (1.75 m)	160 lb (73 kg)	So	Peoria, Arizona
26	RHP	Armani Knipper	R/R	5 ft 11 in (1.8 m)	190 lb (86 kg)	Fr	Southlake, Texas
27	LHP	Cade McGlade (redshirt)	L/L	6 ft 3 in (1.91 m)	210 lb (95 kg)	Jr	McKinney, Texas
28	RHP	Aaron Calhoun	R/R	5 ft 10 in (1.78 m)	170 lb (77 kg)	Jr	Pearland, Texas
29	OF	JD Moreno	L/L	5 ft 9 in (1.75 m)	175 lb (79 kg)	Jr	Grand Prairie, Texas
31	OF	Logan Myers	R/R	6 ft 2 in (1.88 m)	170 lb (77 kg)	Fr	Arlington, Texas
32	RHP	Joe Steeber (redshirt)	R/R	6 ft 4 in (1.93 m)	215 lb (98 kg)	Jr	Southlake, Texas
33	RHP	Trevor Eby	R/R	6 ft 1 in (1.85 m)	170 lb (77 kg)	Jr	Palm Desert, California
34	RHP	Jack Hagan	R/R	6 ft 3 in (1.91 m)	200 lb (91 kg)	Sr	McKinney, Texas
36	C	Reed Thomas	L/R	6 ft 0 in (1.83 m)	185 lb (84 kg)	Sr	Mansfield, Texas
37	LHP	Tristan Wittau (redshirt)	L/L	6 ft 2 in (1.88 m)	190 lb (86 kg)	Jr	Denton, Texas
38	LHP	Caden Noah (redshirt)	L/L	5 ft 10 in (1.78 m)	185 lb (84 kg)	Jr	Longview, Texas
40	C	Jake Curtis	R/R	5 ft 11 in (1.8 m)	175 lb (79 kg)	Jr	Ladera Ranch, California
41	RHP	Tripp Bernethy	R/R	5 ft 10 in (1.78 m)	170 lb (77 kg)	Sr	Burleson, Texas
44	RHP	Collin Horton	R/R	6 ft 0 in (1.83 m)	210 lb (95 kg)	Sr	Keller, Texas
47	LHP	Jacob Hasty	L/L	6 ft 2 in (1.88 m)	230 lb (104 kg)	Sr	Keller, Texas
50	LHP	Sam Collins (redshirt)	R/L	6 ft 1 in (1.85 m)	220 lb (100 kg)	Sr	Azle, Texas
54	LHP	Harrison Hammond	L/L	5 ft 10 in (1.78 m)	180 lb (82 kg)	Sr	Arlington, Texas

Head coach

Clay Van Hook (UT Austin)

Assistant coach(es)

Mike Trapasso
Mike Taylor
Ben Breazeale

Legend

- (C) Team captain
- (S) Suspended
- (I) Ineligible
- Injured
- Current redshirt

Roster
Last update: August 30, 2024

== Schedule and results ==
The UT Arlington Mavericks played 56 games (1 post-season) and went 22–34.

Legend
	UT Arlington win
	UT Arlington loss
	Postponement/Cancelation/Suspensions
**Bold**	UT Arlington team member

2024 UT Arlington Mavericks baseball game log
Regular season (22–34)

February (3–6)
Date	Opponent	Rank	Site/stadium	Score	Win	Loss	Save	TV	Attendance	Overall record	WAC record
Feb 16.	at UTSA		Roadrunner Field • San Antonio, TX	**W** 10–9	**Zach Norris** (1–0)	Robert Orloski (0–1)	**Garrett Gearner** (1)	ESPN+	785	1-0	0-0
Feb 17.	at UTSA		Roadrunner Field • San Antonio, TX	**L** 2–7	Ruger Riojas (1–0)	**Aaron Calhoun** (0–1)		ESPN+	0	1-1	0-0
Feb 17.	at UTSA		Roadrunner Field • San Antonio, TX	**L** 1–2	Braylon Owens (1–0)	**Austin Wallace** (0–1)		ESPN+	737	1-2	0-0
Feb 18.	at UTSA		Roadrunner Field • San Antonio, TX	**W** 5–4	**Nicholas Robb** (1–0)	Fischer Kingsbery (0–1)	**Jacob Hasty** (1)	ESPN+	702	2-2	0-0
Feb 20.	Texas Tech		Globe Life Field • Arlington, TX	**L** 1–13	T. Trombello (1–0)	**Austin Wallace** (0–2)			1094	2-3	0-0
Feb 23.	Boston College		Clay Gould Ballpark • Arlington, Texas	**W** 11–6	**Zach Norris** (2–0)	John West (0–1)		ESPN+	449	3-3	0-0
Feb 24.	Boston College		Clay Gould Ballpark • Arlington, Texas	**L** 0–3	A.J. Colarusso (1-1)	Caylon Dygert (0–1)	Tyler Mudd (1)	ESPN+	338	3-4	0-0
Feb 25.	Boston College		Clay Gould Ballpark • Arlington, Texas	**L** 8–17	Jordan Fisse (2–0)	Garrett Gearner (0–1)		ESPN+	290	3-5	0-0
Feb 28.	at Sam Houston		Don Sanders Stadium • Huntsville, Texas	**L** 2–3	Malachi Lott (1–0)	**Joe Steeber** (0–1)	Chandler David (1)	ESPN+	781	3-6	0-0

March (9-9)
Date	Opponent	Rank	Site/stadium	Score	Win	Loss	Save	TV	Attendance	Overall record	WAC record
Mar 1.	at Lamar		Vincent-Beck Stadium • Beaumont, Texas	**L** 2–4	Jacob Ellis (1–0)	**Zach Norris** (2–1)	Andres Perez (2)	ESPN+	1673	3-7	0-0
Mar 2.	at Lamar		Vincent-Beck Stadium • Beaumont, Texas	**W** 3–1	**Caylon Dygert** (1-1)	Brooks Caple (1–2)			1253	4-7	0-0
Mar 3.	at Lamar		Vincent-Beck Stadium • Beaumont, Texas	**L** 3–7	Jackson Cleveland (1–0)	**Austin Wallace** (0–3)		ESPN+	1103	4-8	0-0
Mar 5.	Arizona State		Clay Gould Ballpark • Arlington, Texas	**L** 3–6	Hunter Omlid (1–2)	**Jacob Hasty** (0–1)		ESPN+	748	4-9	0-0
Mar 8.	Utah Tech		Clay Gould Ballpark • Arlington, Texas	**W** 4–3	**Zach Norris** (3–1)	Dylan Gardner (0–4)	**Caden Noah** (1)	ESPN+	249	5-9	1-0
Mar 9.	Utah Tech		Clay Gould Ballpark • Arlington, Texas	**W** 5–3	**Caylon Dygert** (2–1)	Carston Herman (0–3)	**Nicholas Robb** (1)	ESPN+	301	6-9	2-0
Mar 10.	Utah Tech		Clay Gould Ballpark • Arlington, Texas	**L** 5–6	Ryan Hardman (2–0)	**Caden Noah** (0–1)		ESPN+	307	6-10	2-1
Mar 13.	Oklahoma		Clay Gould Ballpark • Arlington, Texas	**L** 1–5	Grant Stevens (3–0)	**Austin Wallace** (0–4)		ESPN+	571	6-11	2-1
Mar 15.	at Abilene Christian		Crutcher Scott Field • Abilene, Texas	**W** 12–11	**Caden Noah** (1-1)	Brett Garcia (0–2)			357	7-11	3-1
Mar 16.	at Abilene Christian		Crutcher Scott Field • Abilene, Texas	**L** 7–8	Chandler Benson (1–0)	**Caylon Dygert** (2-2)	Cade McGarrh (2)		328	7-12	3-2
Mar 17.	at Abilene Christian		Crutcher Scott Field • Abilene, Texas	**L** 3–7	Brett Lanman (3–1)	**Aaron Calhoun** (0–2)		ESPN+	318	7-13	3-3
Mar 19.	TCU		Lupton Stadium • Fort Worth, Texas	**L** 3–7	Bixby (1–0)	**Austin Wallace** (0–5)			4307	7-14	3-3
Mar 22.	Stephen F. Austin		Clay Gould Ballpark • Arlington, Texas	**W** 16–3	**Zach Norris** (4–1)	Reid Boyett (0–5)		ESPN+	346	8-14	4-3
Mar 23.	Stephen F. Austin		Clay Gould Ballpark • Arlington, Texas	**W** 9–2	**Caylon Dygert** (3–2)	Jack James (0–2)	**Joe Steeber** (1)	ESPN+	431	9-14	5-3
Mar 24.	Stephen F. Austin		Clay Gould Ballpark • Arlington, Texas	**W** 11–7	**Caden Noah** (2–1)	Elian Balmaceda (1–4)		ESPN+	372	10-14	6-3
Mar 26.	Dallas Baptist		Clay Gould Ballpark • Arlington, Texas	**L** 3–5	Jerrod Jenkins (2–0)	**Harrison Hammond** (0–1)	Conner Mackay (1)	ESPN+	423	10-15	6-3
Mar 28.	at California Baptist		Totman Stadium • Riverside, CA	**W** 14–2	**Caden Noah** (3–1)	Jacob Wilson (2–4)		ESPN+	342	11-15	7-3
Mar 29.	at California Baptist		Totman STadium • Riverside, CA	**W** 5–3	**Joe Steeber** (1-1)	Ryan Hetzler (4–1)	**Nicholas Robb** (2)	ESPN+	410	12-15	8-3
Mar 29.	at California Baptist		Totman Stadium • Riverside, CA	**L** 1–7	Ryan Kittredge (1–0)	**Zach Norris** (4–2)		ESPN+	312	12-16	8-4

April (6–11)
Date	Opponent	Rank	Site/stadium	Score	Win	Loss	Save	TV	Attendance	Overall record	WAC record
Apr 2.	TCU		Clay Gould Ballpark • Arlington, Texas	**W** 6–4	**Austin Wallace** (1–5)	Mosiello (0–1)	**Joe Steeber** (2)	ESPN+	592	13-16	8-4
Apr 5.	at UT Rio Grande Valley		UTRGV Baseball St. • Edinburg, TX	**L** 2–8	Isiah Campa (2–0)	**Zach Norris** (4–3)		ESPN+	2044	13-17	8-5
Apr 6.	at UTRGV		UTRGV Baseball St. • Edinburg, TX	**W** 9–5	**Jacob Hasty** (1-1)	Francisco Hernandez (2–3)		ESPN+	6044	14-17	9-5
Apr 7.	at UTRGV		UTRGV Baseball Stad • Edinburg, Texas	**L** 2–3	Nico Rodriguez (3–0)	**Nicholas Robb** (1-1)		ESPN+	818	14-18	9-6
Apr 9.	at Oklahoma		L Dale Mitchell Park • Norman, OK	**L** 9–11	Ryan Lambert (1–0)	**Austin Wallace** (1–6)	Brendan Girton (1)	ESPN+	845	14-19	9-6
Apr 12.	Grand Canyon		Clay Gould Ballpark • Arlington, Texas	**L** 5–7	Hunter Watkins (1–0)	**Zach Norris** (4-4)	Nathan Ward (7)	ESPN+	238	14-20	9-7
Apr 13.	Grand Canyon		Clay Gould Ballpark • Arlington, Texas	**W** 12–4	**Caylon Dygert** (4–2)	Connor Mattison (4–3)		ESPN+	323	15-20	10-7
Apr 14.	Grand Canyon		Clay Gould Ballpark • Arlington, Texas	**L** 5–7	Walter Quinn (2–3)	**Nicholas Robb** (1–2)		ESPN+	387	15-21	10-8
Apr 16.	Baylor		Clay Gould Ballpark • Arlington, Texas	**L** 1–3	Ethan Calder (4–1)	**Aaron Calhoun** (0–3)	**Kobe Andrade** (2)	ESPN+	487	15-22	10-8
Apr 19.	at Utah Valley		UCCU Ballpark • Orem, Utah	**W** 16–5				ESPN+	759	16-22	11-8
Apr 20.	at Utah Valley		UCCU Ballpark • Orem, Utah	**W** 9–4	**Nicholas Robb** (2-2)	Mitch Mueller (3–1)	**Joe Steeber** (3)	ESPN+	717	17-22	12-8
Apr 21.	at Utah Valley		UCCU Ballpark • Orem, Utah	**L** 1–5	Robby Butenschoen (3–0)	**Jason Scrantom** (0–1)	Ethan Fowlks (2)	ESPN+	600	17-23	12-9
Apr 23.	at Texas		UFCU DischFalk Field • Austin, Texas	**L** 0–11	Charlie Hurley (3–0)	**Aaron Calhoun** (0–4)		ESPN+	6977	17-24	12-9
Apr 26.	at Houston		Schroeder Park • Houston, TX	**L** 7–17	Cade Citelli (3–1)	**Zach Norris** (4–0)		ESPN+	1272	17-25	12-9
Apr 27.	at Houston		Schroeder Park • Houston, TX	**W** 7–3	Jacob Hasty (2–1)	Kyle LaCalameto (2–3)		ESPN+	1719	18-25	12-9
Apr 28.	at Houston		Schroeder Park • Houston, TX	**L** 4–10	Antoine Jean (3–2)	**Caden Noah** (3–2)	Jose Torrealba (3)	ESPN+	1341	18-26	12-9
Apr 30.	at Baylor		Baylor Ballpark • Waco, Texas	**L** 3–5	Tanner Duke (1–2)	**Aaron Calhoun** (0–5)	Patrick Hail (1)	ESPN+	1528	18-27	12-9

May (4–6)
Date	Opponent	Rank	Site/stadium	Score	Win	Loss	Save	TV	Attendance	Overall record	WAC record
May 3.	Sacramento State		Clay Gould Ballpark • Arlington, Texas	**L** 2–13	Evan Gibbons (0-0)	**Caylon Dygert** (4–3)			185	18-28	12-10
May 3.	Sacramento State		Clay Gould Ballpark • Arlington, Texas	**W** 5–0	**Zach Norris** (5-5)	Andrew Monson (0–1)			228	19-28	13-10
May 4.	Sacramento State		Clay Gould Ballpark • Arlington, Texas	**L** 5–7	Kade Brown (3-3)	**Joe Steeber** (1–2)			372	19-29	13-11
May 7.	at Dallas Baptist		Horner Ballpark • Dallas, Texas	**L** 6–7	Conner Mackay (3–1)	**Harrison Hammond** (0–2)		ESPN+	1093	19-30	13-11
May 10.	at Seattle U		Bannerwood Park • Bellevue, WA	**W** 13–10	**Caylon Dygert** (5–3)	Luke Alwood (1–6)	**Nicholas Robb** (3)		102	20-30	14-11
May 11.	at Seattle U		Bannerwood Park • Bellevue, WA	**L** 0–4	Blake Smith (5-5)	**Zach Norris** (5–6)	Cameron Dayton (5)		156	20-31	14-12
May 12.	at Seattle U		Bannerwood Park • Bellevue, WA	**L** 4–10	Jarek Woodward (3–6)	**Caden Noah** (3-3)			138	20-32	14-13
May 17.	Tarleton State		Clay Gould Ballpark • Arlington, Texas	**W** 6–2	**Caylon Dygert** (6–3)	Piercen McElyea (3–1)	**Nicholas Robb** (4)		192	21-32	15-13
May 17.	Tarleton State		Clay Gould Ballpark • Arlington, Texas	**W** 9–5	Jacob Hasty (3–1)	Matt Haley (2–9)	Joe Steeber (4)		402	22-32	16-13
May 18.	Tarleton State		Clay Gould Ballpark • Arlington, Texas	**L** 9–19	Parrish Beagle (3–1)	**Aaron Calhoun** (0–6)			471	22-33	16-14

Postseason (0–1)

WAC Tournament (0–1)
Date	Opponent	Seed/Rank	Site/stadium	Score	Win	Loss	Save	TV	Attendance	Overall record	WAC record
May 21.	vs UTRGV		Hohokam Stadium • Mesa, Arizona	**L** 5–8	Zach Tjelmeland (6–3)	**Caden Noah** (3–4)		ESPN+	0	22-34	16-14
