= Elton Pollock =

American college baseball coach (born 1973)

Current position
- Title: Head coach
- Team: Presbyterian
- Conference: Big South
- Record: 444–723–1

Biographical details
- Born: April 17, 1973 (age 53); Columbia, South Carolina, U.S.

Playing career
- 1992–1995: Presbyterian
- 1995: Erie SeaWolves
- 1995–1996: Augusta GreenJackets
- Position: Outfielder

Coaching career (HC unless noted)
- 2002–2004: Presbyterian (asst.)
- 2005–present: Presbyterian

Head coaching record
- Overall: 444–723–1
- Tournaments: SAC: 3–3; Big South: 6–8; NCAA: 0–2

Accomplishments and honors

Championships
- Big South Tournament (2021); Big South regular season (2024)

Awards
- Big South Coach of the Year (2024)

Elton Lewis Pollock (born April 17, 1973) is an American college baseball coach and former center fielder. Pollock is the head coach of the Presbyterian Blue Hose baseball team.

== Amateur career ==
Pollock attended Irmo High School in Columbia, South Carolina. Pollock played for the school's varsity baseball and football teams as well. Pollock then enrolled at Presbyterian College, where he played baseball and football for the Presbyterian Blue Hose.

Pollock finished his career at Presbyterian with 34 home runs, a .616 slugging percentage, 11 triples, 169 runs scored and 382 total bases.

== Professional career ==
Pollock was drafted in the 1995 Major League Baseball draft 405th overall by the Pittsburgh Pirates.

Pollock began his professional career with the Erie SeaWolves of the Class A Short Season New York–Penn League, where he batted .299 with two home runs. He was promoted to the Augusta GreenJackets of the Class A South Atlantic League in the summer of 1995. He hit .234 with five doubles for Augusta. Pollock started 1996 with the GreenJackets. He completed the season batting .235 with 5 home runs and 47 RBIs in 132 games. Pollock retired after the season.

== Coaching career ==
Pollock began his coaching career as a full-time assistant at Presbyterian in 2002. Following the 2003 season, he moved to a volunteer assistant position while working at baseball training facility nearby. In the fall of 2004, Pollock was named the head coach of Presbyterian. He helped guide the team from Division II to Division I in 2008. In 2017, he guided the Blue Hose to their best season in their brief Division I history, finishing 32–29 and in 3rd placed in the Big South Conference.

== Head coaching record ==
Record table
Season	Team	Overall	Conference	Standing	Postseason
Presbyterian Blue Hose (South Atlantic Conference) (2005–2007)
2005	Presbyterian	17–40	6–15	8th	SAC Tournament
2006	Presbyterian	19–39	7–14	6th	SAC Tournament
2007	Presbyterian	18–36	7–17	9th	SAC Tournament
Presbyterian:			20-46		
Presbyterian Blue Hose (Division I Independent) (2008)
2008	Presbyterian	13–40			
Presbyterian Blue Hose (Big South Conference) (2009–present)
2009	Presbyterian	13–38	7–19	9th	ineligible
2010	Presbyterian	17–37	9–18	9th	ineligible
2011	Presbyterian	24–32	9–18	8th	ineligible
2012	Presbyterian	24–31	10–14	9th	ineligible
2013	Presbyterian	24–32	10–14	4th (South)	
2014	Presbyterian	19–34–1	9–18	5th (South)	
2015	Presbyterian	27–28	6–18	10th	
2016	Presbyterian	27–30	12–12	6th	Big South tournament
2017	Presbyterian	32–29	15–9	3rd	Big South tournament
2018	Presbyterian	15–39	8–19	9th	
2019	Presbyterian	30–29	16–11	4th	Big South tournament
2020	Presbyterian	2–14	0–0		Season canceled due to COVID-19
2021	Presbyterian	22–23	18–16	4th	NCAA Regional
2022	Presbyterian	22–32	9–15	9th	
2023	Presbyterian	21–34	12–15	T-6th	
2024	Presbyterian	29–27	18–6	1st	Big South tournament
2025	Presbyterian	17–35	9–15	6th	Big South tournament
2026	Presbyterian	12–44	8–16	9th	
Presbyterian:		444–723–1	185–253		
Total:		444–723–1			
National champion Postseason invitational champion Conference regular season champion Conference regular season and conference tournament champion Division regular season champion Division regular season and conference tournament champion Conference tournament champion

== Personal life ==
Pollock is married with four children, living in irmo, South Carolina.

== See also ==
- List of current NCAA Division I baseball coaches
