= Rob McCoy =

American baseball coach

Current position
- Title: Head coach
- Team: William & Mary
- Conference: CAA
- Record: 42–67 (.385)

Biographical details
- Born: Halfway, Oregon
- Education: Dakota Wesleyan University, University of Virginia

Playing career
- 1999–2000: Clackamas CC
- 2001–2002: Dakota Wesleyan

Coaching career (HC unless noted)
- 2003: Dakota Wesleyan (assistant)
- 2006: James Madison (assistant)
- 2007–2008: Niagara (assistant)
- 2009–2024: Niagara
- 2025–present: William & Mary

Head coaching record
- Overall: 341–527–3 (.393)
- Tournaments: NCAA: 0–2

Accomplishments and honors

Championships
- MAAC regular season (2024); MAAC Tournament (2024)

Awards
- MAAC Coach of the Year (2024)

Rob McCoy is an American baseball coach who is currently the head coach at the College of William & Mary.

== Playing career ==
McCoy spent his first two years playing at Clackamas Community College before transferring to Dakota Wesleyan University. At Wesleyan, he was a captain of the 2002 team that won the Great Plains Athletic Conference championship team, the program's first conference championship in 83 years. He was also named an NAIA Academic All-American Scholar Athlete in 2001.

He would later go on to earn a Master of Education degree in sport and exercise psychology at the University of Virginia while working as a prep coach.

== Coaching career ==
After graduating from Dakota Wesleyan, McCoy got his first job as an assistant at Dakota Wesleyan in 2003. He later worked as an assistant at James Madison in 2006 and at Niagara from 2007 to 2008. Following the resignation of head coach Chris Chernisky prior the start of the 2009 season, McCoy was named the Purple Eagles' interim head coach. Following the conclusion of the 2009 season, he was named Niagara's head coach on a permanent basis.

McCoy led Niagara to its first MAAC Championship and NCAA Tournament appearance in 2024, for which he would earn MAAC Coach of the Year honors. He amassed 299 wins in his 16 seasons at Niagara, leaving as the school's all-time winningest coach.

The following summer, McCoy was hired as head coach at William & Mary. He recorded his first win as the Tribe's head coach on February 14, 2025, against Rhode Island, which was also his 300th career win.

== Head coaching record ==
Record table
Season	Team	Overall	Conference	Standing	Postseason
Niagara Purple Eagles (Metro Atlantic Athletic Conference) (2009–2024)
2009	Niagara	20–35	14–10	T-4th	
2010	Niagara	17–36	13–11	T-5th	
2011	Niagara	8–40	5–19	9th	
2012	Niagara	19–29	7–16	9th	
2013	Niagara	16–38	9–15	T-7th	
2014	Niagara	20–31	8–14	9th	
2015	Niagara	13–32–2	8–16	10th	
2016	Niagara	16–37–1	11–13	7th	
2017	Niagara	24–24	12–12	T-5th	
2018	Niagara	24–27	13–11	6th	MAAC Tournament
2019	Niagara	15–33	9–15	8th	
2020	Niagara	6–10	0–0		Season canceled due to COVID-19
2021	Niagara	17–17	17–15	6th	MAAC Tournament
2022	Niagara	22–32	13–11	6th	MAAC Tournament
2023	Niagara	24–22–1	13–11	5th	MAAC Tournament
2024	Niagara	38–17	20–4	T-1st	NCAA Regional
Niagara:		299–460–4 (.394)	172–193 (.471)		
William & Mary Tribe (Coastal Athletic Association) (2025–present)
2025	William & Mary	21–35	14–13	5th	CAA tournament
2026	William & Mary	21–32	12–18	8th	
William & Mary:		42–67 (.385)	26–31 (.456)		
Total:		341–527–4			
National champion Postseason invitational champion Conference regular season champion Conference regular season and conference tournament champion Division regular season champion Division regular season and conference tournament champion Conference tournament champion
