= Justin Haire =

American college baseball coach

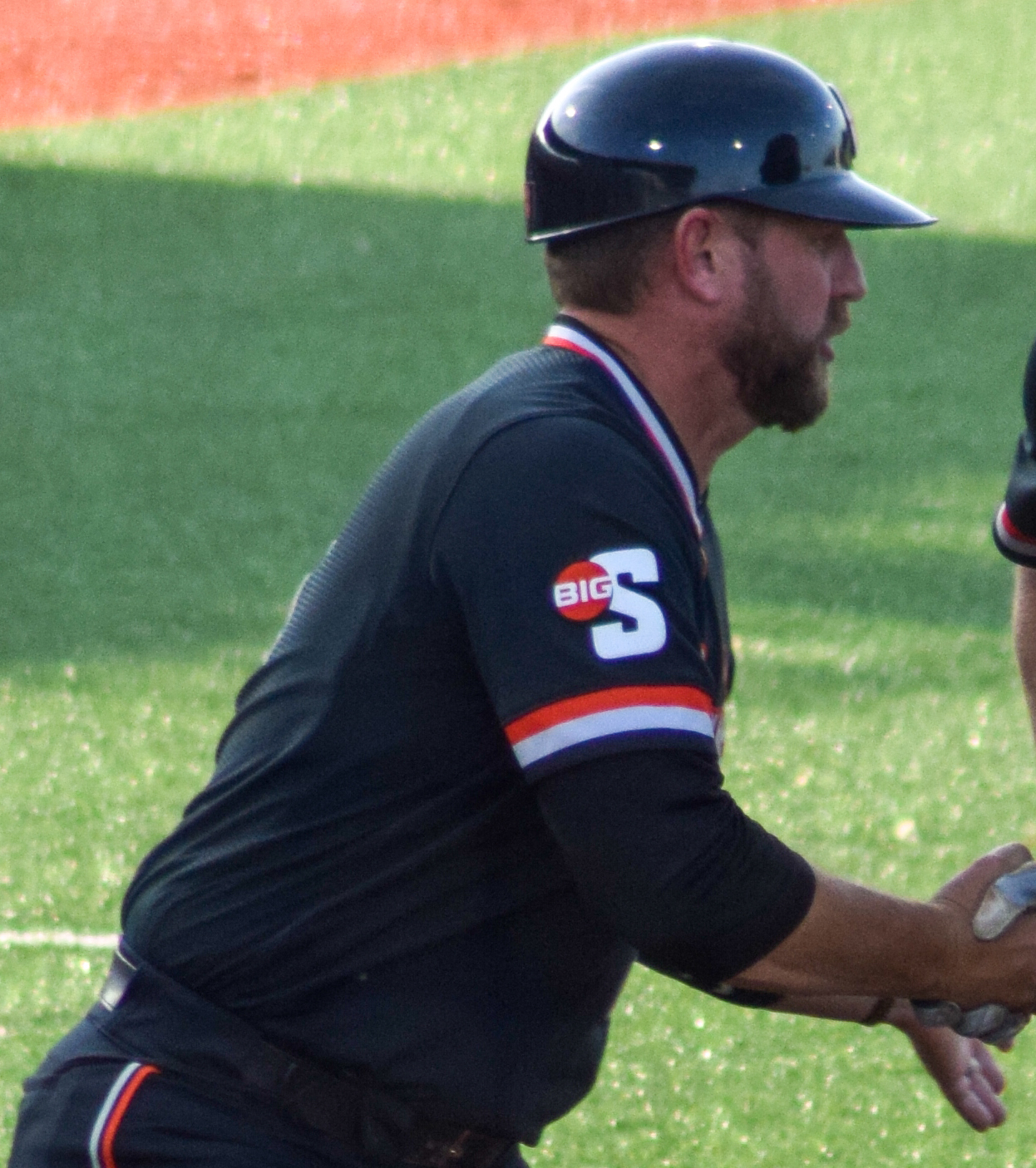
- Haire with Campbell in 2022

Current position
- Title: Head coach
- Team: Ohio State
- Conference: Big 10
- Record: 43–62 (.410)

Biographical details
- Born: November 25, 1980 (age 45); Hamilton, Ohio, U.S.

Playing career
- 2000–2001: Bowling Green
- 2002–2003: Indianapolis
- Position: Catcher

Coaching career (HC unless noted)
- 2004: Sterling (assistant)
- 2005–2007: Ouachita Baptist (assistant)
- 2008–2014: Campbell (assistant)
- 2015–2024: Campbell
- 2025–present: Ohio State

Head coaching record
- Overall: 360–274 (.568)
- Tournaments: Big South: 18–8; NCAA: 7–10; Big Ten: 1-2

Accomplishments and honors

Championships
- 5x Big South (2018, 2019, 2021–2023); 4x Big South Tournament (2018, 2019, 2022, 2023)

Awards
- 4× Big South Coach of the Year (2018, 2021–2023)

Justin Haire (born November 25, 1980) is in American college baseball coach, currently serving as head coach of the Ohio State Buckeyes. He has held that position since the beginning of the 2025 season. He was catcher at Bowling Green and Indianapolis prior to his coaching career. After one season as a pitching coach at Sterling College, he moved to Ouachita Baptist where he remained as an assistant for three seasons. In 2008, he arrived at Campbell as an assistant to Greg Goff, and was elevated to head coach upon Goff's departure after the 2014 season.

== Head coaching record ==
Below is a table of Haire's yearly records as an NCAA baseball coach.

Record table
Season	Team	Overall	Conference	Standing	Postseason
Campbell Fighting Camels (Big South Conference) (2015–2023)
2015	Campbell	32–25	12–12	6th	
2016	Campbell	26–27	13–11	5th	Ineligible
2017	Campbell	25–32	10–14	8th	
2018	Campbell	35–24	21–6	1st	NCAA Regional
2019	Campbell	37–21	19–7	1st	NCAA Regional
2020	Campbell	7–9	0–0		Season canceled due to COVID-19
2021	Campbell	37–18	28–9	1st	NCAA Regional
2022	Campbell	41–19	20–3	1st	NCAA Regional
2023	Campbell	46–15	22–5	1st	NCAA Regional
Campbell:			145–67		
Campbell Fighting Camels (Coastal Athletic Association) (2024)
2024	Campbell	31–22	12–15	T–7th	
Campbell:		317–212	12–15		
Ohio State Buckeyes (Big Ten Conference) (2025–present)
2025	Ohio State	13–37	5–25	17th	
2026	Ohio State	30–25	18–12	T-5th	Big Ten Tournament
Ohio State:		43–62	23–37		
Total:		360–274			
National champion Postseason invitational champion Conference regular season champion Conference regular season and conference tournament champion Division regular season champion Division regular season and conference tournament champion Conference tournament champion

== See also ==
- List of current NCAA Division I baseball coaches
