= Eddie Smith (baseball coach) =

American baseball coach

Current position
- Title: Head coach
- Team: Washington
- Conference: Big Ten
- Record: 29–28 (.509)

Biographical details
- Born: February 8, 1984 (age 41)

Playing career
- 2003–2004: Centralia CC
- 2005–2006: Notre Dame
- Position(s): Infielder

Coaching career (HC unless noted)
- 2007–2011: Virginia (assistant)
- 2012: Santa Clara (assistant)
- 2013: Notre Dame (assistant)
- 2014–2017: Lower Columbia CC
- 2018–2019: Tulane (assistant/RC)
- 2020–2021: LSU (hitting)
- 2022–2024: Utah Valley
- 2025–present: Washington

Head coaching record
- Overall: 111–118 (.485) (college); 146–49 (.749) (junior college)

Accomplishments and honors

Championships
- 3x West Region regular season (2015-17); 2x NWAC conference tournament (2015,17)

Eddie Smith (born February 8, 1984) is an American baseball coach who is currently the head coach at the University of Washington, a role he has held since 2024. He was previously the head coach at Utah Valley University. Prior to Utah Valley, he was the hitting coach at Louisiana State University, where he earned the reputation of being one of the top hitting coaches in college baseball.

== Head coaching record ==
=== College ===
Statistics overview
Season	Team	Overall	Conference	Standing	Postseason
Utah Valley Wolverines (Western Athletic Conference) (2022–2024)
2022	Utah Valley	19–37	10–20	6th (West)	
2023	Utah Valley	34–24	16–12	3rd	WAC Championship Finalists
2024	Utah Valley	29–29	18–12	2nd	
Utah Valley:		82–90 (.477)	44–44 (.500)		
Washington Huskies (Big Ten Conference) (2025–present)
2025	Washington	29–28	17–13	5th	Big Ten tournament
Washington:		29–28 (.509)	17–13 (.567)		
Total:		111–118 (.485)			
National champion Postseason invitational champion Conference regular season champion Conference regular season and conference tournament champion Division regular season champion Division regular season and conference tournament champion Conference tournament champion

=== Junior college ===
Statistics overview
Season	Team	Overall	Conference	Standing	Postseason
Lower Columbia Red Devils (Northwest Athletic Conference) (2014–2017)
2014	Lower Columbia	30–15	17–8		
2015	Lower Columbia	41–10	24–1	West Region Champion	NWAC Champion
2016	Lower Columbia	35–14	21–4	West Region Champion	
2017	Lower Columbia	40–10	21–4	West Region Champion	NWAC Champion
Lower Columbia:		146–49 (.749)	83–17 (.830)		
Total:		146–49 (.749)			
National champion Postseason invitational champion Conference regular season champion Conference regular season and conference tournament champion Division regular season champion Division regular season and conference tournament champion Conference tournament champion
