= 2024 Ivy League baseball tournament =

- Teams: 4
- Format: Double elimination
- Finals site: Robertson Field at Satow Stadium (Games 1–3) Yogi Berra Stadium (Games 4-7); New York, NY & Little Falls, NJ
- Champions: Penn (3rd title)
- Winning coach: John Yurkow (2nd title)
- Television: ESPN+ (first 3 & last 2 games only)

2024 Ivy League baseball standings
	Conf.				Overall
Team	W		L	PCT	W		L	PCT
Columbia ‍†‍‍	17	–	4	.810	26	–	18	.591
Princeton ‍‍‍	12	–	9	.571	18	–	26	.409
Cornell ‍‍‍	11	–	10	.524	17	–	21	.447
Penn ‍‍‡‍^{y}	11	–	10	.524	24	–	23	.511
Yale ‍‍‍	11	–	10	.524	18	–	23	.439
Harvard ‍‍‍	9	–	12	.429	13	–	26	.333
Dartmouth ‍‍‍	7	–	14	.333	13	–	26	.333
Brown ‍‍‍	6	–	15	.286	11	–	28	.282
† – Conference champion ‡ – Tournament champion y – Invited to the NCAA Tournament; As of May 20, 2024; Rankings from D1Baseball

The 2024 Ivy League baseball tournament was a postseason baseball tournament for the Ivy League in the 2024 NCAA Division I baseball season. The tournament took place from May 17–20, 2024 and was held at Robertson Field at Satow Stadium and Yogi Berra Stadium. The 30th annual Ivy tournament, Penn won the tournament for the second straight year and earned the automatic berth to the 2024 NCAA Division I baseball tournament.

Due to a field maintenance issue at Robertson Field at Satow Stadium following the third game of the tournament deeming the field unplayable, the final four games of the tournament was played at Yogi Berra Stadium on the campus of Montclair State University in Little Falls, New Jersey.

== Format ==
The top four teams in the Ivy League were seeded based on their records in league play. Ties in the standings were broken based on head-to-head record. The tournament was a double elimination tournament played at the site of the regular season champion.

== Bracket ==
First Round
1	Columbia	4
4	Penn	8
Winner's bracket
2	Princeton	7
3	Cornell	9
1	Columbia	6
2	Princeton	16
Loser's bracket

Semifinal
4	Penn	6
3	Cornell	7
2	Princeton	4
4	Penn	9

Final
3	Cornell	9	6
4	Penn	11	12

== Results ==
=== Game 1 ===
May 17, 2024 11:00 AM at Robertson Field at Satow Stadium
Team	1	2	3	4	5	6	7	8	9	R	H	E
Cornell	3	0	0	4	0	0	0	0	2	9	9	1
Princeton	0	2	0	0	0	3	2	0	0	7	10	0
WP: Chris Ellison (4–0) LP: Andrew D'Alessio (3–2); Home runs: Cornell: Mark Quatrani; Princeton: Matt Scannell, Kyle Vinci; Boxscore

=== Game 2 ===
May 17, 2024 3:00 PM at Robertson Field at Satow Stadium
Team	1	2	3	4	5	6	7	8	9	R	H	E
Penn	0	1	0	1	0	0	2	3	1	8	14	0
Columbia	0	0	0	0	4	0	0	0	0	4	5	2
WP: Carson Ozmer (2–1) LP: Thomas Santana (4–1); Home runs: Penn: None; Columbia: Wyatt Henseler; Boxscore

=== Game 3 ===
May 18, 2024 11:00 AM at Robertson Field at Satow Stadium
Team	1	2	3	4	5	6	7	8	9	R	H	E
Princeton	3	0	0	0	4	5	0	0	4	16	15	4
Columbia	0	2	3	0	0	0	0	0	1	6	11	1
WP: Jacob Faulkner (8–1) LP: Joe Sheets (4–4); Home runs: Princeton: Caden Shapiro, Jake Kernodle; Columbia: EJ Kreutzmann; Notes: Columbia eliminated Boxscore

=== Game 4 ===
May 19, 2024 12:30 PM at Yogi Berra Stadium
Team	1	2	3	4	5	6	7	8	9	R	H	E
Penn	0	2	0	0	0	1	3	0	0	6	9	1
Cornell	0	0	1	0	0	0	6	0	X	7	9	2
WP: Von Baker (2–0) LP: Will Tobin (2–3) Sv: Chris Ellison (1); Home runs: Penn: Wyatt Henseler, Davis Baker; Cornell: Mark Quatrani, Kevin Hager; Boxscore

=== Game 5 ===
May 19, 2024 4:30 PM at Yogi Berra Stadium
Team	1	2	3	4	5	6	7	8	9	R	H	E
Princeton	0	0	2	0	0	2	0	0	0	4	9	2
Penn	2	0	0	0	1	0	3	3	X	9	12	0
WP: Danny Heintz (1–0) LP: Max Zdimal (1–2); Home runs: Princeton: Matt Scannell, Caden Shapiro; Penn: Nick Spaventa; Notes: Princeton eliminated Boxscore

=== Game 6 ===
May 20, 2024 1:30 PM at Yogi Berra Stadium
Team	1	2	3	4	5	6	7	8	9	R	H	E
Cornell	0	0	5	1	0	2	0	0	1	9	13	3
Penn	2	4	0	1	0	1	3	0	X	11	12	0
WP: Cole Zaffiro (5–4) LP: Noah Keller (1–6); Home runs: Cornell: Kevin Hager, Caden Wildman; Penn: Connor Chavez; Boxscore

=== Game 7 ===
Ivy League Championship
(4) Penn Quakers	vs.	(3) Cornell Big Red

May 20, 2024 5:30 PM at Yogi Berra Stadium
Team	1	2	3	4	5	6	7	8	9	R	H	E
Penn	3	0	0	3	1	0	0	5	0	12	11	2
Cornell	0	0	1	1	0	4	0	0	0	6	12	0
WP: Marty Coyne (1–0) LP: Ryan Porter (0–2); Home runs: Penn: Davis Baker, Gavin Collins; Cornell: Max Jensen; Notes: Penn wins Ivy League tournament Boxscore
