= 2024 The Citadel Bulldogs baseball team =

American college baseball season

2024 The Citadel Bulldogs baseball
- Conference: Southern Conference
- Record: 21–32 (3–18 SoCon)
- Head coach: Tony Skole (7th season)
- Hitting coach: Zach Lucas (5th season)
- Pitching coach: Blake Cooper (7th season)
- Home stadium: Joseph P. Riley Jr. Park

2024 Southern Conference baseball standings
	Conf.				Overall
Team	W		L	PCT	W		L	PCT
UNC Greensboro ‍†‍‍	15	–	6	.714	33	–	21	.611
Samford ‍‍‍	14	–	7	.667	36	–	22	.621
East Tennessee State ‍‍‍	13	–	8	.619	36	–	20	.643
Western Carolina ‍‍‍	13	–	8	.619	28	–	26	.519
Wofford ‍‍‡‍^{y}	12	–	8	.600	41	–	18	.695
VMI ‍‍‍	7	–	14	.333	27	–	29	.482
Mercer ‍‍‍	6	–	14	.300	29	–	29	.500
The Citadel ‍‍‍	3	–	18	.143	21	–	32	.396
† – Conference champion ‡ – Tournament champion y – Invited to the NCAA tournament As of May 26, 2024; Rankings from D1Baseball

2024 The Citadel Bulldogs baseball team represented The Citadel in the 2024 NCAA Division I baseball season. The Bulldogs played their home games at Joseph P. Riley Jr. Park in Charleston, South Carolina. The team were coached by Tony Skole, in his 7th season at The Citadel.

The Citadel recorded an overall record of 21–32, and finished in 8th place with a record of 3–18 in the Southern Conference.

== Previous season ==
The Bulldogs finished 22–29 overall, and 7–14 in the Southern Conference in 2023.

== Personnel ==
=== Roster ===
2024 The Citadel Bulldogs baseball roster
Pitchers: 9 - Ben Hutchins - Senior; 12 - Sam Swygert - Senior; 13 - George Derrick Floyd - Junior; 15 - Landon Slemp - Junior; 17 - Fisher Paulsen - Junior; 19 - Maddox Webb - Freshman; 23 - Will Holmes - Junior; 24 - Will Morris - Junior; 28 - Anthony Hausner - Sophomore; 29 - Aryan Patel - Sophomore; 30 - Luke Kissenberth - Senior; 32 - Ben Brash - Freshman; 33 - CJ Van Slooten - Sophomore; 35 - Ethan Fewell - Senior; 38 - Conner Cummiskey - Senior; 42 - Matthew Polk - Junior; 44 - Yates Bland - Sophomore; 55 - Jack Thunberg - Junior	Catchers: 4 - Garrett Fulmer - Freshman; 14 - Travis Lott - Graduate Student; 21 - Phillips Daniels - Sophomore; Infielders: 1 - Lane Tobin - Junior; 2 - Thomas Rollauer - Junior; 5 - Sawyer Reeves - Senior; 8 - Garrett Dill - Junior; 10 - Javier Crespo - Junior; 20 - Travis Elliott - Senior	Outfielders: 0 - Wells Sykes - Junior; 18 - Matthew Lively - Sophomore; 22 - Chase Loggins - Junior; 31 - Paul Taylor - Freshman; Utility: 3 - Tyler Christmas - (redshirt) Freshman; 6 - Landon Kahl - Freshman; 25 - Antonio Colon - Senior; 50 - Billy Holmes - Sophomore

=== Coaches ===
2024 The Citadel Bulldogs baseball coaching staff
- Tony Skole – Head coach – 7th year
- Zach Lucas – Assistant coach (hitting/recruiting) – 5th year
- Blake Cooper – Assistant coach (pitching) – 7th year
