= 2024 UConn Huskies baseball team =

American college baseball season

2024 UConn Huskies baseball

Big East Conference regular season champions

Tallahassee Super Regional
- Conference: Big East Conference
- Record: 35–26 (17–4 Big East)
- Head coach: Jim Penders (21st season)
- Assistant coaches: Jeff Hourigan (13th season); Joshua McDonald (13th season); Chris Podeszwa (21st season)
- Home stadium: Elliot Ballpark

2024 Big East Conference baseball standings
	Conf.						Overall
Team	W		L		T	PCT	W		L		T	PCT
UConn ‍†‍‍^{y}	17	–	4	–	0	.810	32	–	23	–	0	.582
St. John's ‍‍‡‍^{y}	14	–	7	–	0	.667	37	–	16	–	1	.694
Georgetown ‍‍‍	13	–	7	–	0	.650	36	–	21	–	0	.632
Xavier ‍‍‍	12	–	9	–	0	.571	30	–	27	–	0	.526
Villanova ‍‍‍	8	–	13	–	0	.381	18	–	33	–	0	.353
Creighton ‍‍‍	7	–	13	–	0	.350	35	–	17	–	0	.673
Seton Hall ‍‍‍	7	–	14	–	0	.333	24	–	30	–	0	.444
Butler ‍‍‍	5	–	16	–	0	.238	20	–	35	–	0	.364
† – Conference champion ‡ – Tournament champion y – Invited to the NCAA tournament As of May 25, 2024; Rankings from D1Baseball

The 2024 UConn Huskies baseball team represented the University of Connecticut in the 2024 NCAA Division I baseball season. They played their home games at Elliot Ballpark on campus in Storrs, Connecticut. The team was coached by Jim Penders, in his 21st season at UConn and played as a member of the Big East Conference.

== Previous season ==
The 2023 Huskies finished with a record of 43–15, 15–5 in the Big East. They won the Big East regular season title and were seeded second in the NCAA Gainesville Regional, in which they were beaten by 3rd seed Texas Tech, but won against 4th seed Florida A&M, but lose to 1st seed Florida.

== Coaches ==
2024 Connecticut Huskies baseball coaching staff
- 16 – Jim Penders – head coach – 21st season
- 29 – Jeff Hourigan – assistant coach/recruiting coordinator – 13th season
- 33 – Joshua MacDonald – assistant coach – 13th season
- 14 – Chris Podeszwa – volunteer assistant coach – 21st season

== Schedule ==
Legend
	UConn win
	UConn loss
	Cancellation
**Bold**	UConn team member
*	Non-Conference game
+	Conference game

2023 Connecticut Huskies baseball game log
Regular season

February
Date	Opponent	Rank	Site/stadium	Score	Win	Loss	Save	Attendance	Overall record	BE Record
February 16th (Note: Part of a doubleheader.)	Louisville*		USF Baseball Stadium • Tampa, Florida	**W 4-3**	**Ben Schild (1-0)**	Kayden Cambell (0-1)	None	404	1-0	--
February 16	at South Florida*		USF Baseball Stadium • Tampa, Florida	**W 2-1**	**Garrett Coe (1-0)**	Hunter Mink (0-1)	**Brady Afthim (1)**	1,153	2-0	--
February 17th	Indiana State*		USF Baseball Stadium • Tampa Florida	**L** 1-2	Jacob Pruitt (1-0)	**Stephen Quigley (0-1)**	Adam Berghorst (1)	242	2-1	--
February 23rd	at. California*		Stu Gordon Stadium • Berkeley, California	**L** 4-8	Christian Becerra (2-0)	**Garrett Coe (1-1)**	None	393	2-2	--
February 24th	at California*		Stu Gordon Stadium • Berkeley, California	**L** 12-15	Robert Aivazian (1-0)	**Joe Cinnella (0-1)**	Tyler Stasiowski (2)	625	2-3	--
February 25th	at California*		Stu Gordon Stadium • Berkeley, California	**L** 4-5	Austin Turkington (1-0)	**Brady Afthim (0-1)**	None	375	2-4	--

March
Date	Opponent	Rank	Site/stadium	Score	Win	Loss	Save	Attendance	Overall record	BE Record
March 2nd	at No. 23 Auburn*		Plainsman Park • Auburn, Alabama	**L** 1-8	Chase Allsup (1-0)	**Garrett Coe (1-2)**	John Armstrong (1)	4,239	2-5	--
March 2nd	at No. 23 Auburn*		Plainsman Park • Auburn, Alabama	**W 8-4**	**Gabe Van Emon (1-0)**	Joseph Gonzalez (2-1)	**Brady Afthim (2)**	4,239	3-5	--
March 3rd	at No. 23 Auburn*		Plainsman Park • Auburn, Alabama	**L** 2-8	Cam Tilly (2-0)	**Stephen Quigley (0-2)**	None	3,497	3-6	--
March 8th	at No. 25 UC Santa Barbara*		Caesar Uyesaka Stadium • Santa Barbara, California	**L** 3-13	M. Ager (2-1)	**Garrett Coe (1-3)**	None	609	3-7	--
March 9th	at No.25 UC Santa Barbara*		Caesar Uyesaka Stadium • Santa Barbara, California	**L** 3-4	T. Bremner (1-0)	**Braden Quinn (0-1)**	None	497	3-8	--
March 10th	at No. 25 UC Santa Barbara*		Caesar Uyesaka Stadium • Santa Barbara, California	**L** 1-12	R. Gallagher (2-0)	**Stephen Quigley (0-3)**	None	4-3	3-9	--
March 12th	at UCLA*		Jackie Robinson Stadium • Los Angeles, California	**W 5-2**	**Garrett Coe (2-3)**	Cedon Kottinger (0-1)	**Braden Quinn (1)**	332	4-9	--
March 13th	at UC Irvine*		Anteater Ballpark • Irvine, California	**W 5-0**	**Ben Schild (2-0)**	David Vizcaino (0-1)	None	622	5-9	--
March 15th	at California Baptist*		James W. Totman Stadium • Riverside, California	**L** 1-8	Lukas Priko (3-0)	**Gabe Van Emon (1-1)**	None	44	5-10	--
March 16th	at California Baptist*		James W. Totman Stadium • Riverside, California	**W 8-0**	**Garrett Coe (3-3)**	Brandon Downer (1-2)	None	219	6-10	--
March 17th	at California Baptist*		James W. Totman Stadium • Riverside, California	**w 6-2**	**Jack Sullivan (1-0)**	Nathan Hemmerling (2-1)'	None	410	7-10	--
March 19th	at Rhode Island*		Bill Beck Field • Kingston, Rhode Island	**L** 1-4	Brandon Hsu (1-1)	**Joe Cinnella (0-2)**	Kenny Heon (1)	142	7-11	--
March 20th	vs LIU*		Elliot Ballpark • Storrs, Connecticut	**W 14-8**	**Ian Cooke (1-0)**	Latkowski (0-2)	None	340	8-11	--
March 22nd	at Rutgers*		Bainton Field • Piscataway, New Jersey	**L** 0-3	Justin Sinibaldi (4-0)	**Gabe Van Emon (1-2)**	None	427	8-12	--
March 23rd	at Rutgers*		Bainton Field • Piscataway, New Jersey	**L** 6-13	Christian Coppola (4-1)	**Garrett Coe (3-4)**	Jake Marshall (3)	423	8-13	--
March 24th	at Rutgers*		Bainton Field • Piscataway, New Jersey	**W 5-1**	**Stephen Quigley (1-3)**	Zack Konstantinovsky (0-3)'	None	619	9-13	--
March 26th	vs Boston College*		Elliot Ballpark • Storrs, Connecticut	**L** 7-4	Kyle Kipp (1-0)	**Ian Cooks (1-1)**	Eric Schroeder (1)	451	9-14	--
March 27th	vs Northestern*		Elliot Ballpark • Storrs, Connecticut	**L** 7-6	Michael Gemma (3-0)	**Gabe Van Emon (1-3)**	Jack Beauchesne (2)	396	9-15	--

April
Date	Opponent	Rank	Site/stadium	Score	Win	Loss	Save	Attendance	Overall record	BE Record
April 1st	vs Central Connecticut*		Elliot Ballpark • Storrs, Connecticut	**W 14-6**	**Joe Cinnella (1-2)**	R. Guzman (0-1)	None	441	10-15	--
April 2nd	vs Columbia*		Elliot Ballpark • Storrs, Connecticut	Canceled (inclement weather)						
April 5th	vs Xavier+		Elliot Ballpark • Storrs, Connecticut	**L** 5-9	Luke Hoskins (4-3)	**Gabe Van Emon (1-4)**	Alex Vera (3)	339	10-16	0-1
April 6th	vs Xavier+		Elliot Ballpark • Storrs, Connecticut	**W 8-2**	**Garrett Coe (4-4)**	Logan Schmidt (4-3)	None	669	11-16	1-1
April 7th	vs Xavier+		Elliot Ballpark • Storrs, Connecticut	**W 1-0**	**Braden Quinn (1-1)**	Nick Boyle (3-3)	**Brady Afthim (3)**	689	12-16	2-1
	*		•						13-16	--
	*		•						14-16	--

May
Date	Opponent	Rank	Site/stadium	Score	Win	Loss	Save	Attendance	Overall record	BE Record

Postseason

Big East Tournament
Date	Opponent	Rank	Site/stadium	Score	Win	Loss	Save	Attendance	Overall record	BET Record

Norman Regional
Date	Opponent	Rank	Site/stadium	Score	Win	Loss	Save	TV	Attendance	Overall record	NCAA record

Tallahassee Super Regional
Date	Opponent	Rank	Site/stadium	Score	Win	Loss	Save	TV	Attendance	Overall record	NCAA record

Rankings from D1Baseball. Parentheses indicate tournament seedings.
