= Chris Rodriguez (baseball, born 1976) =

American baseball player and coach

Biographical details
- Born: May 10, 1976 (age 49); West Covina, California, U.S.

Playing career
- 1995–1996: Modesto
- 1996: AZL Rockies
- 1997: Portland Rockies
- 1997: Asheville Tourists
- Position(s): Catcher

Coaching career (HC unless noted)
- 2005–2008: Modesto (asst.)
- 2009–2012: Modesto
- 2013–2018: San Joaquin Delta (asst.)
- 2019: Pacific (asst.)
- 2020–2024: Pacific

Head coaching record
- Overall: 64–159

Christopher C. Rodriguez (born May 10, 1976) is an American college baseball coach and former catcher. He is the former head baseball coach at the University of the Pacific. Rodridguez played college baseball at Modesto Junior College from 1995 to 1996 before pursuing a professional career from 1996 to 1997. He was the head baseball coach at Modesto Junior College from 2009 to 2012.

== Playing career ==
After graduation from high school, Rodriguez choose to attend Modesto Junior College. After two seasons at Modesto, Rodriguez was drafted in the 52nd round of the 1996 Major League Baseball draft by the Colorado Rockies. Rodriguez began his professional career with the Arizona League Rockies of the rookie league Arizona League, where he batted .173 with six runs batted in. The next year, Rodriguez started the year with the Asheville Tourists of the Class A South Atlantic League, where he would play two games before being demoted to the Portland Rockies, where he batted .264, helping the Rockies to a Northwest League championship.

== Coaching career ==
On October 26, 2018, Rodriguez joined Ryan Garko's staff at the University of the Pacific.

On January 8, 2020, Rodriguez was promoted to interim head coach when Garko left the school to take a job with the Los Angeles Angels. On June 5, 2020, the University of Pacific removed the interim tag, officially naming Rodriguez the 19th head baseball coach in school history.

On May 20, 2024, Pacific announced that they had parted ways with Rodriguez after 5 years.

== Head coaching record ==
Statistics overview
Season	Team	Overall	Conference	Standing	Postseason
Pacific Tigers (West Coast Conference) (2020–2024)
2020	Pacific	8–8	0–0		Season canceled due to COVID-19
2021	Pacific	17–34	7–20	10th	
2022	Pacific	14–38	5–22	10th	
2023	Pacific	14–35	6–21	10th	
2024	Pacific	11–44	5–19	8th	
Pacific:		64–159	23–82		
Total:		64–159			
National champion Postseason invitational champion Conference regular season champion Conference regular season and conference tournament champion Division regular season champion Division regular season and conference tournament champion Conference tournament champion
