= 2024 West Coast Conference baseball tournament =

- Teams: 6
- Format: Double-elimination
- Finals site: Las Vegas Ballpark; Summerlin South, NV
- Television: ESPN+ ESPNU

2024 West Coast Conference baseball standings
	Conf.				Overall
Team	W		L	PCT	W		L	PCT
San Diego ‍†‍‡‍^{y}	20	–	4	.833	40	–	13	.755
Portland ‍‍‍	19	–	5	.792	37	–	19	.661
Saint Mary's ‍‍‍	16	–	8	.667	34	–	22	.607
Gonzaga ‍‍‍	14	–	10	.583	21	–	32	.396
Santa Clara ‍‍‍	12	–	12	.500	26	–	26	.500
Loyola Marymount ‍‍‍	9	–	15	.375	24	–	30	.444
Pepperdine ‍‍‍	9	–	15	.375	15	–	38	.283
Pacific ‍‍‍	5	–	19	.208	11	–	44	.200
San Francisco ‍‍‍	4	–	20	.167	21	–	34	.382
† – Conference champion ‡ – Tournament champion y – Invited to the NCAA Tournament; As of May 25, 2024; Rankings from D1Baseball

The 2024 West Coast Conference baseball tournament was held from May 22 through 25 at Las Vegas Ballpark in Summerlin South, Nevada. It was the second of four baseball tournaments the WCC has scheduled for the venue. The six team tournament winner, the San Diego Toreros, earned the league's automatic bid to the 2024 NCAA Division I baseball tournament.

The tournament used the 6-team format adapted in 2022 where 3 plays 6 and 4 plays 5 in first day elimination games.

== Seeding ==
The top six finishers from the regular season were seeded one through six based on conference winning percentage. Teams 1 and 2 had a bye into the double elimination bracket while 3 played 6 and 4 played 5 in a single elimination first round.

Team	W	L	Pct.	GB	Seed
San Diego	20	4	.833	-	1
Portland	19	5	.792	1	2
Saint Mary's	17	8	.680	3	3
Gonzaga	14	10	.583	6	4
Santa Clara	12	12	.500	8	5
Pepperdine	9	15	.375	11	6
Loyola Marymount	9	15	.375	11	-
San Francisco	4	20	.167	16	—
Pacific	5	19	.208	15	—

Tiebreakers:

Pepperdine is the #6 position because they went 2-1 vs. Loyola Marymount.

== Results ==
=== Play-in round ===
Wednesday, May 22
Team	R
#6 Pepperdine	10
#3 Saint Mary's	14

Wednesday, May 22
Team	R
#5 Santa Clara	4
#4 Gonzaga	9

=== Double-elimination round ===
First round
1	San Diego	10
4	Gonzaga	7
2	Portland	16
3	Saint Mary's	7
Lower round 1
4	Gonzaga	11
3	Saint Mary's	5

Semi-finals
1	San Diego	7
2	Portland	5
Lower final
2	Portland	21
4	Gonzaga	3

Finals
1	San Diego	8	—
2	Portland	6	—

== Schedule ==
All matches except the championship game were broadcast on ESPN+. The championship game was televised on ESPNU.

Game	Time*	Matchup^{#}	Television	Attendance
Wednesday, May 22
1	3:00 p.m.	#3 Saint Mary's 14, #6 Pepperdine 10	ESPN+	
2	7:40 p.m.	#4 Gonzaga 9, #5 Santa Clara 4	ESPN+	812
Thursday, May 23
3	3:00 p.m.	#1 San Diego 10, #4 Gonzaga 7	ESPN+	
4	7:30 p.m.	#2 Portland 16, #3 Saint Mary's 7	ESPN+	1225
Friday, May 24
5	12:00 p.m.	#4 Gonzaga 11, #3 Saint Mary's 5	ESPN+	
6	4:25 p.m.	#1 San Diego 7, #2 Portland 5	ESPN+	
7	8:40 p.m.	#2 Portland 21, #4 Gonzaga 3	ESPN+	430
Championship – Saturday, May 25
8	1:00 p.m.	#1 San Diego 8, #2 Portland 6	ESPNU	803
*Game times in Pacific Time. # – Rankings denote tournament seed.
