= 2024 Southern Conference baseball season =

- League: Southern Conference
- Sport: Baseball
- Teams: 8
- TV partner: ESPN+

Regular Season
- Season champions: UNC Greensboro
- Season MVP: Caleb Cozart (UNCG) (Coaches); Cameron Sisneros (ETSU) (Media)

Tournament
- Champions: Wofford
- Runners-up: Samford
- Tournament MVP: Zac Cowan (WOF)

Seasons
- ← 2023 2025 →

2024 Southern Conference baseball standings
	Conf.				Overall
Team	W		L	PCT	W		L	PCT
UNC Greensboro ‍†‍‍	15	–	6	.714	33	–	21	.611
Samford ‍‍‍	14	–	7	.667	36	–	22	.621
East Tennessee State ‍‍‍	13	–	8	.619	36	–	20	.643
Western Carolina ‍‍‍	13	–	8	.619	28	–	26	.519
Wofford ‍‍‡‍^{y}	12	–	8	.600	41	–	18	.695
VMI ‍‍‍	7	–	14	.333	27	–	29	.482
Mercer ‍‍‍	6	–	14	.300	29	–	29	.500
The Citadel ‍‍‍	3	–	18	.143	21	–	32	.396
† – Conference champion ‡ – Tournament champion y – Invited to the NCAA tournament As of May 26, 2024; Rankings from D1Baseball

The 2024 Southern Conference baseball season was the baseball season for the Southern Conference as part of the 2024 NCAA Division I baseball season. Samford was predicted to win the conference in the preseason poll. The conference tournament was played from May 22 to May 26 at Fluor Field at the West End in Greenville, South Carolina.

== Regular season ==
The Southern Conference began conference play on March 22, and conference play ended on May 18. Each team was scheduled to play 21 conference games, barring any cancellations.

In regular season play, UNC Greensboro won the outright SoCon regular season title by one game. The eight SoCon baseball coaches voted Caleb Cozart of UNC Greensboro as 2024 SoCon Player of the Year, while the SoCon Sports Media Association voted Cameron Sisneros of East Tennessee State as 2024 SoCon Baseball Player of the Year. Both the coaches and media selected Michael Ross of Samford as 2024 SoCon Baseball Pitcher of the Year, Daniel Jackson of Wofford as 2024 SoCon Baseball Freshman of the Year, and Cody Ellis of UNC Greensboro was voted 2024 SoCon Baseball Coach of the Year.

=== Standings ===
Pos	Team	Pld	CW	CL	CPCT	GB	W	L	PCT	Qualification
1	UNC Greensboro (C)	52	15	6	.714	—	33	19	.635	Qualification for the third round
2	Samford	54	14	7	.667	1	34	20	.630	Qualification for the third round
3	East Tennessee State	52	13	8	.619	2	34	18	.654	Qualification for the second round
4	Western Carolina	52	13	8	.619	2	28	24	.538	Qualification for the second round
5	Wofford (T)	52	12	8	.600	2.5	35	17	.673	Qualification for the play-in round & NCAA tournament
6	VMI	55	7	14	.333	8	27	28	.491	Qualification for the play-in round
7	Mercer	53	6	14	.300	8.5	26	27	.491	Qualification for the play-in round
8	The Citadel	52	3	18	.143	12	21	31	.404	Qualification for the play-in round

Source: Southern Conference
(C) Regular season champion(s); (T) Tournament champion

=== Conference Game Results ===
Home \ Away	CIT	ETSU	MER	SAM	UNCG	VMI	WCU	WOF
The Citadel				0–3	0–3		0–3	
East Tennessee State	3–0		2–1			3–0		
Mercer	1–2					1–2		1–1 (Note: The final game of the MER-WOF series was cancelled due to inclement weather.)
Samford		2–1	2–1			3–0		1–2
UNC Greensboro		2–1	2–1	2–1		3–0		
VMI	2–1						1–2	2–1
Western Carolina		1–2	3–0	1–2	1–2			
Wofford	3–0	2–1			2–1		1–2	

Updated to match(es) played on May 19, 2024. Source: Southern Conference
Legend: Blue = home team win; Red = away team win.

== Tournament ==
2024 Southern Conference baseball tournament
- Teams: 8
- Format: Single-elimination play-in, then six-team double-elimination tournament
- Finals site: Fluor Field at the West End; Greenville, SC
- Champions: Wofford (2nd title)
- Winning coach: J.J. Edwards (1st title)
- MVP: Zac Cowan (WOF)
- Television: ESPN+

The 2024 Southern Conference baseball tournament was held from May 22 through May 26 at Fluor Field at the West End in Greenville, South Carolina. The winner of the conference tournament received an automatic bid to the 2024 NCAA Division I baseball tournament.

All eight SoCon baseball teams participated in the tournament, with the bottom four seeds playing in a single-elimination play-in round. The remaining teams then played a six-team double-elimination tournament, with the top two seeds receiving byes into the third round, and the third and fourth placed teams playing the play-in round winners in the second round. The Samford Bulldogs were defending champions, having won the 2023 edition of the tournament.

Both play-in round winners, the Wofford Terriers and Mercer Bears, made it to at least the second-to-last day of the tournament, with Mercer losing in the third round and the lower semifinal, and Wofford losing their semifinal matchup to Samford before beating the Bulldogs twice in the championship.

The East Tennessee State Buccaneers and Western Carolina Catamounts both received byes into the second round, but fell to their opponents from the play-in round. The Buccaneers made it all the way to the lower final after their initial defeat, but the Catamounts fell to Mercer in their next game.

The UNC Greensboro Spartans and Samford Bulldogs received byes into the third round as the top two regular season teams. The Spartans lost both of their games, while the Bulldogs won all of their games up until the championship series against Wofford, where they lost two games to the Terriers.

With these two wins in the championship, Wofford won their first SoCon tournament title since 2007, which until this year, was their only SoCon tournament victory and NCAA tournament berth in program history. Wofford right-handed pitcher Zac Cowan received the Walt Nadzak Award, which is named after Walt Nadzak and awarded to the tournament's most outstanding player.

=== Bracket ===
Play-in round
Game 1
5	Wofford	8
8	The Citadel	3
Game 2
6	VMI	14
7	Mercer	19

Second round
Game 3
4	Western Carolina	1
5	Wofford	12^{7}
Game 4
3	East Tennessee State	4
7	Mercer	7
Lower third round
Game 7
3	East Tennessee State	10
1	UNC Greensboro	7
Game 8
4	Western Carolina	8
7	Mercer	10

Third round
Game 5
1	UNC Greensboro	2
5	Wofford	5
Game 6
2	Samford	9
7	Mercer	7
Lower semifinal
Game 10
3	East Tennessee State	12
7	Mercer	4

Semifinals
Game 9
5	Wofford	1
2	Samford	10
Lower final
Game 11
5	Wofford	13
3	East Tennessee State	10

Final
Games 12 and 13
2	Samford	9	9
5	Wofford	10	15

Source: Southern Conference

=== Schedule ===
Game	Time^{*}	Matchup^{#}	Score	Reference
Day 1 (Wednesday, May 22)
1	3:00 p.m.	No. 5 Wofford vs. No. 8 The Citadel	8-3	
2	7:00 p.m.	No. 6 VMI vs. No. 7 Mercer	14-19	
Day 2 (Thursday, May 23)
3	3:00 p.m.	No. 5 Wofford vs. No. 4 Western Carolina	12-1^{7}	
4	7:00 p.m.	No. 7 Mercer vs. No. 3 East Tennessee State	7-4	
Day 3 (Friday, May 24)
5	9:00 a.m.	No. 5 Wofford vs. No. 1 UNC Greensboro	5-2	
6	12:30 p.m.	No. 7 Mercer vs. No. 2 Samford	7-9	
7	4:00 p.m.	No. 3 East Tennessee State vs. No. 1 UNC Greensboro	10-7	
8	7:30 p.m.	No. 4 Western Carolina vs. No. 7 Mercer	8-10	
Day 4 (Saturday, May 25)
9	12:00 p.m.	No. 5 Wofford vs. No. 2 Samford	1-10	
10	3:30 p.m.	No. 3 East Tennessee State vs. No. 7 Mercer	12-4	
11	7:00 p.m.	No. 5 Wofford vs. No. 3 East Tennessee State	13-10	
Day 5 (Sunday, May 26)
12	12:00 p.m.	No. 2 Samford vs. No. 5 Wofford	9-10	
13	3:40 p.m.	No. 2 Samford vs. No. 5 Wofford	9-15	
* Game times are in EDT. # Rankings denote tournament seed. Superscripted number next to scores denote games that use extra innings or the run rule. Source: Southern Conference

== Conference leaders ==
Hitting leaders
Stat	Player	Total
AVG	Nick Iannantone (ETSU)	.387
HR	Cameron Sisneros (ETSU)	23
RBI	Cameron Sisneros (ETSU)	86
R	Marshall Toole (WOF)	83
H	Brice Martinez (WOF)	97
SB	Marshall Toole (WOF)	43

Pitching leaders
Stat	Player	Total
W	Michael Ross (SAM)	13
L	Trey Morgan (VMI)	7
ERA	Michael Ross (SAM)	3.27
K	Zac Cowan (WOF)	124
IP	Zac Cowan (WOF)	110.0
SV	Bryant Olson (MER); Carson Lore (SAM)	8

Final update provided on June 24, 2024.

== See also ==
- 2024 in baseball
