= 2024 Patriot League baseball tournament =

- Teams: 4
- Format: Best-of-three series
- Finals site: Johnson Stadium at Doubleday Field; West Point, New York
- Champions: Army (13th title)
- Winning coach: Chris Tracz (2nd title)
- MVP: Matthew Ronnebaum (Army)
- Television: ESPN+

2024 Patriot League baseball standings
	Conf.						Overall
Team	W		L		T	PCT	W		L		T	PCT
Army ‍†‍‡‍^{y}	16	–	8	–	0	.667	31	–	21	–	0	.596
Navy ‍‍‍	15	–	10	–	0	.600	28	–	23	–	0	.549
Holy Cross ‍‍‍	14	–	11	–	0	.560	26	–	27	–	0	.491
Bucknell ‍‍‍	12	–	13	–	0	.480	22	–	24	–	0	.478
Lehigh ‍‍‍	9	–	16	–	0	.360	24	–	23	–	1	.510
Lafayette ‍‍‍	8	–	16	–	0	.333	14	–	35	–	0	.286
† – Conference champion ‡ – Tournament champion y – Invited to the NCAA Tournament; As of May 20, 2024; Rankings from D1Baseball

The 2024 Patriot League baseball tournament took place on consecutive weekends, with the semifinals held on May 11–13 and the finals on May 19–20. The higher seeded teams hosted each best of three series. The winner, Army, earned the conference's automatic bid to the 2024 NCAA Division I baseball tournament.

== Seeding ==
The top four finishers from the regular season are seeded one through four, with the top seed hosting the fourth seed and second seed hosting the third. The higher seeded team was designated as the home team for each game of the series.

Team	W	L	Pct.	GB	Seed
Army	16	8	.667	—	1
Navy	15	10	.600	1.5	2
Holy Cross	14	11	.560	2.5	3
Bucknell	12	13	.480	4.5	4
Lehigh	9	16	.360	7.5	—
Lafayette	8	16	.333	8	—

== Bracket ==
Semifinals
1	Army	3	9	6
4	Bucknell	4	7	5
2	Navy	5	7	6
3	Holy Cross	10	3	2

Championship
1	Army	11	3	–
2	Navy	8	0	–

== Results ==
=== Semifinal Series ===
==== #4 Bucknell at #1 Army ====
May 11, 2024 1:00 PM at Johnson Stadium at Doubleday Field Game 1
Team	1	2	3	4	5	6	7	8	9	R	H	E
Bucknell	0	1	0	0	1	0	2	0	0	4	8	1
Army	0	0	0	0	0	0	2	0	1	3	6	0
WP: Tyler O'Neill (5–5) LP: Justin Lehman (5–3); Home runs: Bucknell: Jacob Corson, Michael Trommer; Army: None; Boxscore

May 13, 2024 1:00 PM at Johnson Stadium at Doubleday Field Game 2
Team	1	2	3	4	5	6	7	8	9	R	H	E
Bucknell	3	0	0	4	0	0	0	0	0	7	7	1
Army	2	0	0	0	0	0	5	2	X	9	8	4
WP: Tanner Gresham (1–0) LP: Johnathan Adelmann (1–5); Home runs: Bucknell: None; Army: Sam Ruta; Boxscore

May 13, 2024 4:45 PM at Johnson Stadium at Doubleday Field Game 3
Team	1	2	3	4	5	6	7	8	9	R	H	E
Bucknell	0	0	2	0	2	0	1	0	0	5	6	2
Army	0	0	1	1	0	0	0	4	X	6	8	0
WP: Steven Graver (4–1) LP: Nick Mulvey (0–2); Home runs: Bucknell: Jacob Corson, Grant Voytovich; Army: Derek Berg; Notes: Army wins series 2–1; Boxscore

==== #3 Holy Cross at #2 Navy ====
May 11, 2024 1:00 PM at Terwilliger Brothers Field at Max Bishop Stadium Game 1
Team	1	2	3	4	5	6	7	8	9	R	H	E
Holy Cross	0	2	2	3	0	1	0	2	0	10	11	1
Navy	5	0	0	0	0	0	0	0	0	5	13	1
WP: Alex Bryant (5–3) LP: Tyler Grenn (6–4) Sv: Nick Harnisch (3); Home runs: Holy Cross: Jack Toomey; Navy: None; Boxscore

May 12, 2024 1:20 PM at Terwilliger Brothers Field at Max Bishop Stadium Game 2
Team	1	2	3	4	5	6	7	8	9	R	H	E
Holy Cross	0	1	0	0	0	0	0	0	2	3	6	1
Navy	5	0	2	0	0	0	0	0	X	7	11	1
WP: Brady Bendik (6–3) LP: Danny Macchiarola (6–5) Sv: Landon Kruer (8); Boxscore

May 12, 2024 5:00 PM at Terwilliger Brothers Field at Max Bishop Stadium Game 3
Team	1	2	3	4	5	6	7	8	9	R	H	E
Holy Cross	0	0	0	0	1	0	1	0	0	2	4	0
Navy	0	0	3	0	2	0	0	1	X	6	14	0
WP: Matthew Shirah (3–4) LP: Jaden Wywoda (4–5) Sv: Landon Kruer (9); Notes: Navy wins series 2–1; Boxscore

=== Championship Series ===
May 19, 2024 1:00 PM at Johnson Stadium at Doubleday Field Game 1
Team	1	2	3	4	5	6	7	8	9	R	H	E
Navy	2	0	0	4	0	0	0	2	0	8	14	0
Army	0	7	0	1	3	0	0	0	X	11	11	1
WP: Andrew Berg (5–2) LP: Tyler Grenn (6–5) Sv: Steven Graver (1); Home runs: Navy: Eduardo Diaz; Army: William Parker, Braden Golinski; Boxscore

May 20, 2024 1:00 PM at Johnson Stadium at Doubleday Field Game 2
Team	1	2	3	4	5	6	7	8	9	R	H	E
Navy	0	0	0	0	0	0	0	0	0	0	2	0
Army	0	0	3	0	0	0	0	0	0	3	2	0
WP: Matthew Ronnebaum (6–3) LP: Matthew Shirah (3–5) Sv: Tanner Gresham (1); Notes: Army wins Patriot League tournament Boxscore
