= Mike Trapasso =

American baseball coach (born 1963)

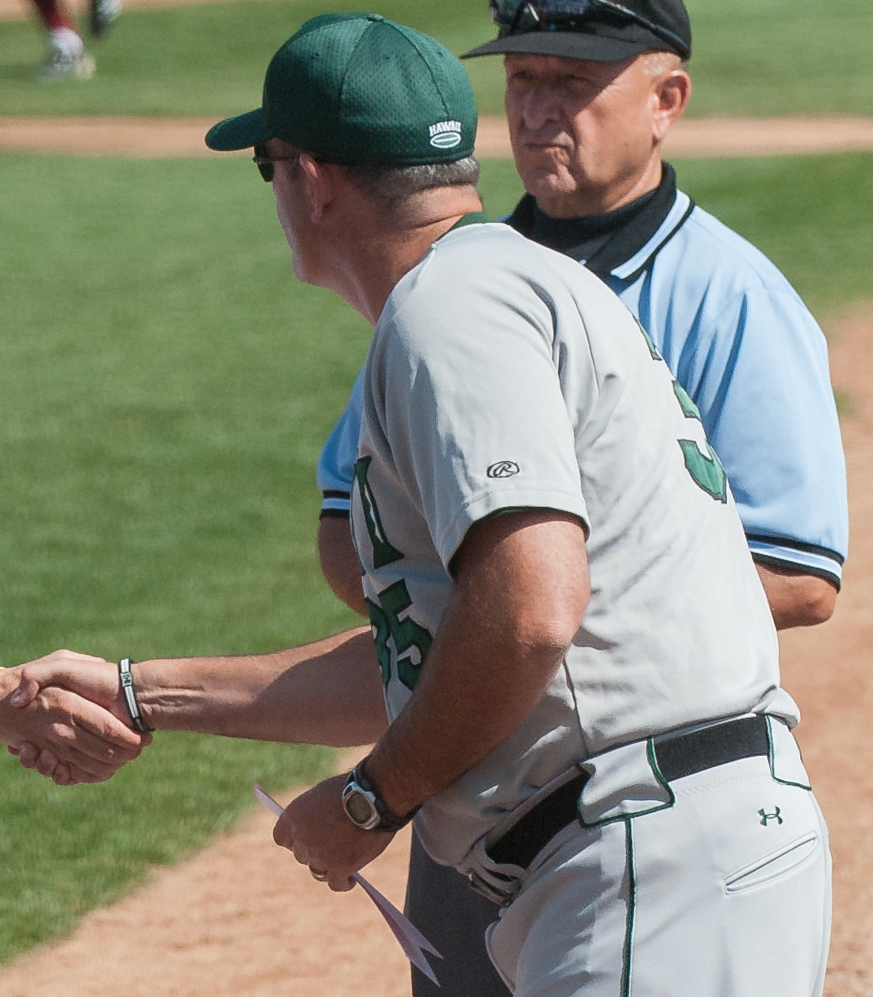
- Trapasso with Hawaii in 2011

Current position
- Title: Head coach
- Team: UT Arlington
- Conference: WAC
- Record: 21–33 (.389)

Biographical details
- Born: September 18, 1963 (age 63); St. Louis, Missouri, U.S.

Playing career
- 1982–1983: Jefferson College
- 1984–1985: Oklahoma State
- Position: Pitcher

Coaching career (HC unless noted)
- 1989–1991: Missouri (asst.)
- 1992–1994: South Florida (asst.)
- 1995–2001: Georgia Tech (asst.)
- 2002–2021: Hawaii
- 2022: Navy (asst.)
- 2023–2024: UT Arlington (asst.)
- 2025–present: UT Arlington

Head coaching record
- Overall: 557–564 (.497)
- Tournaments: 4–4 (NCAA)

Accomplishments and honors

Championships
- WAC regular season (2011); WAC tournament (2010)

Awards
- 3× WAC Coach of the Year (2004, 2006, 2011)

Michel Trapasso (born September 18, 1963) is an American college baseball coach and former pitcher who is currently the head coach for the UT Arlington Mavericks of the Western Athletic Conference. He played college baseball at Jefferson College before transferring to Oklahoma State. He then served as head coach of the Hawaii Rainbow Warriors (2002–2021).

== Playing career ==
Trapasso played two years at Jefferson College before completing his career and degree at Oklahoma State. He pitched in the 1984 College World Series, claiming the win in game 1, and finished with the top ERA in the Big 8 Conference and in the top five in the nation. He faced arm injuries during his senior season, but was signed by the Atlanta Braves after completing his college career. Trapasso played for three years in the minors, reaching low Class A in the St. Louis Cardinals organization. Trapasso's playing career ended with the 1987 season.

== Coaching career ==
Trapasso's coaching days began at Missouri as an assistant for three years, while earning a master's degree. He then moved to South Florida where he served as pitching coach, helping the Bulls to a conference title and ranking in the top 20 nationally in ERA in 1993. He then moved to Georgia Tech where he served as the top assistant and recruiting coordinator, building a young pitching staff that would deliver two Atlantic Coast Conference titles in his seven seasons. In those seven seasons, his recruiting classes all ranked in the top 20 nationally, including a top ranked class and two others in the top 10, according to Collegiate Baseball Newspaper. He was named the top national recruiter by Baseball America in 2001.

Following his success with the Yellow Jackets, Trapasso became head coach at Hawaii beginning with the 2002 season. The 2003 team improved by 14 wins over his inaugural season. In 2004, he was named Western Athletic Conference Coach of the Year after leading the Rainbows to their second consecutive 30 win season. Trapasso then led Hawaii to the 2006 NCAA Division I baseball tournament and a 45–17 record, a performance that landed him another WAC Coach of the Year award, along with several national honors. Since then, he has claimed another WAC Coach of the Year award, a conference title, conference tournament championship, and another NCAA appearance. He also signed a three-year extension after the 2011 season. Prior to the 2014 season, Trepasso would receive another 3-year contract extension. On February 6, 2017, University of Hawaii athletics announced a one-year contract extension for Trapasso, through the end of the 2018 season.

Trapasso's contract was not renewed after the 2021 season, ending his twenty-year tenure with the Rainbow Warriors. His 536 wins are second in program history, only behind Les Murakami.

Trapasso was named the pitching coach at Navy in 2021. He joined the coaching staff at UT Arlington in 2022. Following Clay Van Hook's resignation in August 2024, UTA promoted Trapasso to head coach.

== Head coaching record ==
Record table
| Season | Team | Overall | Conference | Standing | Postseason |
|---|---|---|---|---|---|
Hawaii Rainbows (Western Athletic Conference) (2002–2012)
| 2002 | Hawaii | 16–40 | 5–25 | 6th | |
| 2003 | Hawaii | 30–26 | 11–19 | 4th | |
| 2004 | Hawaii | 31–24 | 13–16 | 4th | |
| 2005 | Hawaii | 28–27 | 15–14 | 3rd | |
| 2006 | Hawaii | 45–17 | 17–6 | 2nd | NCAA Regional |
| 2007 | Hawaii | 34–25 | 11–13 | t-4th | WAC Tournament |
| 2008 | Hawaii | 29–31 | 18–14 | t-2nd | WAC Tournament |
| 2009 | Hawaii | 32–26 | 11–12 | 5th | WAC Tournament |
| 2010 | Hawaii | 35–28 | 12–12 | 4th | NCAA Regional |
| 2011 | Hawaii | 34–25 | 17–7 | t-1st | WAC Tournament |
| 2012 | Hawaii | 30–25 | 10–8 | 4th | WAC Tournament |
| Hawaii: | | – (–) | 140–146 (.490) | | |
Hawaii Rainbow Warriors (Big West Conference) (2013–2021)
| 2013 | Hawaii | 16–35 | 11–16 | 7th | |
| 2014 | Hawaii | 22–31 | 6–18 | T-8th | |
| 2015 | Hawaii | 21–32 | 12–12 | 5th | |
| 2016 | Hawaii | 23–30 | 12–12 | 5th | |
| 2017 | Hawaii | 28–23 | 10–14 | T-5th | |
| 2018 | Hawaii | 27–24 | 11–13 | 6th | |
| 2019 | Hawaii | 20–30 | 8–16 | T-7th | |
| 2020 | Hawaii | 11–6 | 0–0 | | Season canceled due to COVID-19 |
| 2021 | Hawaii | 24–26 | 16–24 | 8th | |
| Hawaii: | | 536–531 (.502) | 86–125 (.408) | | |
UT Arlington Mavericks (Western Athletic Conference) (2025–present)
| 2025 | UT Arlington | 21–33 | 11–13 | 7th | WAC Tournament |
| UT Arlington: | | 21–33 (.389) | 11–13 (.458) | | |
| Total: | | 557–564 (.497) | | | |
National champion Postseason invitational champion Conference regular season champion Conference regular season and conference tournament champion Division regular season champion Division regular season and conference tournament champion Conference tournament champion
