= 2024 Big East Conference baseball tournament =

American college baseball tournament

- Teams: 4
- Format: Double-elimination tournament
- Finals site: Prasco Park; Mason, Ohio
- Champions: St. John's (10th title)
- Television: Big East DN; FS2 (final)

2024 Big East Conference baseball standings
	Conf.						Overall
Team	W		L		T	PCT	W		L		T	PCT
UConn ‍†‍‍^{y}	17	–	4	–	0	.810	32	–	23	–	0	.582
St. John's ‍‍‡‍^{y}	14	–	7	–	0	.667	37	–	16	–	1	.694
Georgetown ‍‍‍	13	–	7	–	0	.650	36	–	21	–	0	.632
Xavier ‍‍‍	12	–	9	–	0	.571	30	–	27	–	0	.526
Villanova ‍‍‍	8	–	13	–	0	.381	18	–	33	–	0	.353
Creighton ‍‍‍	7	–	13	–	0	.350	35	–	17	–	0	.673
Seton Hall ‍‍‍	7	–	14	–	0	.333	24	–	30	–	0	.444
Butler ‍‍‍	5	–	16	–	0	.238	20	–	35	–	0	.364
† – Conference champion ‡ – Tournament champion y – Invited to the NCAA tournament As of May 25, 2024; Rankings from D1Baseball

The 2024 Big East Conference Baseball Tournament was held at Prasco Park in Mason, Ohio from May 22 through May 25. The event, held at the end of the conference regular season, determined the champion of the Big East Conference for the 2024 season. St. John's won the tournament for the league-leading 10th time to receive the conference's automatic bid to the 2024 NCAA Division I baseball tournament.

== Format and seeding ==
The tournament used a double-elimination format and feature the top four finishers of the Big East's eight teams, seeded by conference winning percentage in the round-robin regular season.

Team	W	L	Pct.	GB	Seed
UConn	17	4	.810	—	1
St. John's	14	7	.667	3	2
Georgetown	13	7	.650	3.5	3
Xavier	12	9	.571	5	4
Villanova	8	13	.381	9	—
Creighton	7	13	.350	9.5	—
Seton Hall	7	14	.333	10	—
Butler	5	16	.238	12	—

== Bracket ==
First round
1	UConn	2
4	Xavier	3 ^{(11)}
Winner's bracket
3	Georgetown	9
2	St. John's	11
1	UConn	9
3	Georgetown	10 ^{(10)}
Loser's bracket

Semi-finals
4	Xavier	7
2	St. John's	8
4	Xavier	6
3	Georgetown	9

Finals
2	St. John's	4	—
3	Georgetown	2	—

== Game Results ==
Date	Game	Winning team	Score	Losing team	Notes
May 22	Game 1	(2) St. John's	11–9	(3) Georgetown	
May 23	Game 2	(4) Xavier	3–2 ^{(11)}	(1) UConn	
May 23	Game 3	(3) Georgetown	10–9 ^{(10)}	(1) UConn	UConn eliminated
May 23	Game 4	(2) St. John's	8–7	(4) Xavier	
May 24	Game 5	(3) Georgetown	9–6	(4) Xavier	Xavier eliminated
May 25	Game 6	(2) St. John's	4–2	(3) Georgetown	St. John's wins Big East tournament

== All-Tournament team ==
The following players were named to the All-Tournament Team.

Pos	Name	School	Class
P	Xavier Kolhosser	St. John's	R-So.
P	Alex Vera	Xavier	Gr.
P	Evan Chaffee	St. John's	So.
C	Jimmy Keenan	St. John's	So.
C	Matt DePrey	Xavier	Sr.
IF	Josh Rolling	Georgetown	Sr.
IF	Luke Orbon	St. John's	So.
OF	Jake Hyde	Georgetown	Sr.
OF	Kavi Caster	Georgetown	Sr.
OF	Garrett Scavelli	St. John's	Sr.
DH	Tyler Minick	UConn	Fr.

=== Jack Kaiser Award ===
Jimmy Keenan won the Jack Kaiser Award as Tournament Most Outstanding Player. Keenan was a sophomore catcher for St. John's who batted 7–14 with two home runs, six RBI, and three runs scored for the tournament.
