= Pacific Tigers baseball =

- 2026 Pacific Tigers baseball team
- Founded: 1945; 81 years ago
- University: University of the Pacific (United States)
- Head coach: Toby DeMello (1st season)
- Conference: West Coast Conference
- Location: Stockton, California
- Home stadium: Klein Family Field (capacity: 2,500)
- Nickname: Tigers
- Colors: Black and orange

The Pacific Tigers baseball team represents the University of the Pacific, which is located in Stockton, California. The Tigers are an NCAA Division I college baseball program that competes in the West Coast Conference.

== NCAA Tournament ==
Pacific has never participated in the NCAA Division I baseball tournament.

== List of coaches ==
Coach	Tenure	Record	Pct.
Larry Siemering	1945	15–5	.750
Hugh McWilliams	1946–1952	91–77–3	.532
Van Sweet	1953–1954	13–32–1	.293
Chuck Melick	1955	0–19–1	.025
Skip Rowland	1956–1957	13–24	.351
Sid Hall	1958–1959	17–22	.436
Chuck Chatfield	1960	8–12	.400
Bill Tunnell	1961	12–8	.600
Bob Mazzuca	1962	6–21	.222
Bob Vanderwall	1963	7–17	.292
Tom Stubbs	1964–1971; 1973–1981	410–383–5	.514
John Gunther	1972	21–28	.429
John Picone	1982–1987	126–187–1	.403
Keith Snider	1988–1989	34–74	.315
Quincey Noble	1990–2003	355–388–1	.477
Ed Sprague Jr.	2004–2015	250–406	.381
Mike Neu	2016–2017	40–65	.381
Ryan Garko	2018–2019	45–55	.450
Chris Rodriguez	2020–2024	64–160	.286
Reed Peters	2025–2026	44–66–1	.340

== See also ==
- List of NCAA Division I baseball programs
