= Clay Van Hook =

American baseball coach (born 1985)

Current position
- Title: Assistant coach/Recruiting coordinator
- Team: Houston
- Conference: Big 12

Biographical details
- Born: January 18, 1985 (age 41); Austin, Texas, U.S.

Playing career
- 2004: Navarro College
- 2005–2007: Texas
- Position: Infielder

Coaching career (HC unless noted)
- 2008: Texas (SA)
- 2009–2011: McNeese State (H)
- 2012–2017: Rice (H)
- 2018–2022: Oklahoma (H)
- 2023–2024: UT Arlington
- 2025–present: Houston (asst.)

Head coaching record
- Overall: 51–63 (.447)

Clay Van Hook (born January 18, 1985) is an American baseball coach and former infielder, who is currently an assistant coach and recruiting coordinator for the Houston Cougars. He previously was the head baseball coach of the UT Arlington Mavericks. He played college baseball at Navarro College and Texas from 2004 to 2007.

== Coaching career ==
On July 1, 2022, Van Hook was named the head coach of the UT Arlington Mavericks. On August 9, 2024, he resigned as head coach and accepted an assistant coach position at Houston.

== Head coaching record ==
Record table
Season	Team	Overall	Conference	Standing	Postseason
UT Arlington Mavericks (Western Athletic Conference) (2023–2024)
2023	UT Arlington	29–29	16–14	6th	
2024	UT Arlington	22–34	16–14	6th	
UT Arlington:		51–63 (.447)	32–28 (.533)		
Total:		51–63 (.447)			
National champion Postseason invitational champion Conference regular season champion Conference regular season and conference tournament champion Division regular season champion Division regular season and conference tournament champion Conference tournament champion
