= 2024 Big South Conference baseball tournament =

- Teams: 4
- Format: Double-elimination
- Finals site: Truist Point; High Point, North Carolina
- Champions: High Point Panthers (1st title)
- Winning coach: Joey Hammond (1st title)
- MVP: Eric Grintz (High Point)
- Television: ESPN+

2024 Big South Conference baseball standings
	Conf.						Overall
Team	W		L		T	PCT	W		L		T	PCT
Presbyterian ‍†‍‍	18	–	6	–	0	.750	29	–	27	–	0	.518
High Point ‍‍‡‍^{y}	17	–	7	–	0	.708	34	–	25	–	0	.576
USC Upstate ‍‍‍	16	–	8	–	0	.667	36	–	24	–	0	.600
Charleston Southern ‍‍‍	12	–	12	–	0	.500	22	–	32	–	0	.407
Longwood ‍‍‍	10	–	14	–	0	.417	23	–	29	–	0	.442
UNC Asheville ‍‍‍	10	–	14	–	0	.417	22	–	28	–	0	.440
Gardner-Webb ‍‍‍	9	–	15	–	0	.375	22	–	31	–	0	.415
Winthrop ‍‍‍	8	–	15	–	0	.348	19	–	29	–	1	.398
Radford ‍‍‍	7	–	16	–	0	.304	16	–	34	–	0	.320
† – Conference champion ‡ – Tournament champion y – Invited to the NCAA Tournament; As of May 25, 2024; Rankings from D1Baseball

The 2024 Big South Conference baseball tournament was held from May 23 through 25 at Truist Point in High Point, North Carolina. The top four regular season finishers of the conference's nine teams met in the double-elimination tournament. The tournament champion, High Point, earned the conference's automatic bid to the 2024 NCAA Division I baseball tournament. This was the first ever conference championship and appearance in the NCAA tournament for High Point.

== Seeding and format ==
The top four finishers of the league's nine teams qualify for the double-elimination tournament. Teams are seeded based on conference winning percentage, with the first tiebreaker being head-to-head record.

== Results ==
First round
1	Presbyterian	4
4	Charleston Southern	5
Winner's bracket
3	USC Upstate	8
2	High Point	10
1	Presbyterian	8
3	USC Upstate	9
Loser's bracket

Semi-finals
4	Charleston Southern	11
2	High Point	12
3	USC Upstate	4
4	Charleston Southern	2

Finals
2	High Point	6	–
3	USC Upstate	0	–

== Schedule ==
Game	Time*	Matchup^{#}	Score	Notes	Reference
Thursday, May 23
1	1:00pm	No. 4 Charleston Southern vs No. 1 Presbyterian	5–4		
2	5:00pm	No. 2 High Point vs No. 3 USC Upstate	10–8		
Friday, May 24
3	11:00am	No. 1 Presbyterian vs No. 3 USC Upstate	8–9	Presbyterian eliminated	
4	3:00pm	No. 2 High Point vs No. 4 Charleston Southern	12–11		
5	7:00pm	No. 4 Charleston Southern vs No. 3 USC Upstate	2–4	Charleston Southern eliminated	
Saturday, May 25
6	12:00pm	No. 2 High Point vs No. 3 USC Upstate	6–0	High Point wins championship	
7	4:00pm	Rematch (not necessary)			
*Game times in EDT. # – Rankings denote tournament seed.

== All–Tournament Team ==
Position	Player	Team
C	Eric Grintz (MVP)	High Point
INF	Vance Sheahan	USC Upstate
INF	Troy Hamilton	USC Upstate
INF	Brayden Simpson	High Point
INF	Jack Gorman	Presbyterian
OF	Jace Rinehart	USC Upstate
OF	Konni Durschlag	High Point
OF	Cade Conway	Charleston Southern
DH	Noah Sullivan	USC Upstate
P	Mathieu Curtis	USC Upstate
P	Brett Wozniak	High Point
UTL	Sam Massey	Charleston Southern
