= 1991 NCAA Division I baseball season =

Baseball season

- Number of teams: 271

NCAA tournament

College World Series
- Champions: LSU (1st title)
- Runners-up: Wichita State (2nd CWS Appearance)
- Winning coach: Skip Bertman (1st title)
- MOP: Gary Hymel (LSU)

Seasons
- ← 1990 1992 →

The 1991 NCAA Division I baseball season, play of college baseball in the United States organized by the National Collegiate Athletic Association (NCAA) began in the spring of 1991. The season progressed through the regular season and concluded with the 1991 College World Series. The College World Series, held for the 45th time in 1991, consisted of one team from each of eight regional competitions and was held in Omaha, Nebraska, at Johnny Rosenblatt Stadium as a double-elimination tournament. LSU claimed the championship for the first time.

== Realignment ==
- Hardin–Simmons departed the Trans America Athletic Conference (TAAC) and NCAA Division I, reclassifying as NCAA Division III and joining the Texas Intercollegiate Athletic Association.
- FIU joined the TAAC, departing the ranks of Independents.

=== Format changes ===
- The Metro Conference dissolved their divisions and played as a single eight team conference.
- The TAAC retained its divisions, but shifted Samford to the West Division. FIU joined the East Division.

== Conference winners ==
This is a partial list of conference champions from the 1991 season. The NCAA sponsored regional competitions to determine the College World Series participants. Each of the eight regionals consisted of six teams competing in double-elimination tournaments, with the winners advancing to Omaha. 25 teams earned automatic bids by winning their conference championship while 23 teams earned at-large selections.

Conference	Regular season winner	Conference Tournament	Tournament Venue • City	Tournament Winner
Atlantic 10 Conference	East - Rutgers; West - Penn State	1991 Atlantic 10 Conference baseball tournament	Bear Stadium • Boyertown, PA	Rutgers
Atlantic Coast Conference	Clemson	1991 Atlantic Coast Conference baseball tournament	Greenville Municipal Stadium • Greenville, SC	Clemson
Big East Conference	St. John's	1991 Big East Conference baseball tournament	Muzzy Field • Bristol, CT	Villanova
Big Eight Conference	Oklahoma State	1991 Big Eight Conference baseball tournament	All Sports Stadium • Oklahoma City, OK	Oklahoma State
Big South Conference	Coastal Carolina	1991 Big South Conference baseball tournament	Charles Watson Stadium • Conway, SC	Coastal Carolina
Big Ten Conference	Ohio State	1991 Big Ten Conference baseball tournament	Trautman Field • Columbus, OH	Ohio State
Big West Conference	Cal State Fullerton/Fresno State	no tournament		
Colonial Athletic Association	Richmond	1991 Colonial Athletic Association baseball tournament	Harrington Field • Greenville, NC	East Carolina
EIBL	Princeton	no tournament		
Metro Conference	Florida State	1991 Metro Conference baseball tournament	Salem Municipal Field • Salem, VA	Florida State/Southern Miss (Note: Florida State and Southern Miss were declared co-champions after the championship game was canceled due to rain.)
Mid-American Conference	Ohio	no tournament		
Midwestern Collegiate Conference	Evansville	1991 Midwestern Collegiate Conference baseball tournament	Stanley Coveleski Regional Stadium • South Bend, IN	Notre Dame
Mid-Continent Conference	Blue - Akron; Gray - Eastern Illinois	1991 Mid-Continent Conference baseball tournament	Chicago, IL	Akron
Pacific-10 Conference	North - Washington State; South - Southern California	no tournament		
Southeastern Conference	LSU	1991 Southeastern Conference baseball tournament	Alex Box Stadium • Baton Rouge, LA	Florida
Southern Conference	The Citadel	1991 Southern Conference baseball tournament	College Park • Charleston, SC	Furman
Southwest Conference	Texas	1991 Southwest Conference baseball tournament	Olsen Field • College Station, TX	Texas
Trans America Athletic Conference	East - Stetson; West - Samford	1991 Trans America Athletic Conference baseball tournament	Conrad Park • DeLand, FL	FIU

== Conference standings ==
The following is an incomplete list of conference standings:

1991 Atlantic Coast Conference baseball standings
	Conf.				Overall
Team	W		L	PCT	W		L	PCT
No. 8 Clemson ‍†‍‡‍^{y}	18	–	3	.857	60	–	10	.857
No. 26 Georgia Tech ‍‍‍^{y}	12	–	8	.600	42	–	26	.618
No. 27 NC State ‍‍‍^{y}	11	–	10	.524	48	–	20	.706
North Carolina ‍‍‍	10	–	10	.500	36	–	23	.610
Wake Forest ‍‍‍	10	–	10	.500	37	–	22	.627
Virginia ‍‍‍	10	–	11	.476	28	–	27	.509
Duke ‍‍‍	6	–	15	.286	24	–	27	.471
Maryland ‍‍‍	5	–	15	.250	29	–	27	.518
† – Conference champion ‡ – Tournament champion y – Invited to the NCAA tournament As of June 30, 1991; Rankings from Collegiate Baseball

1991 Big East Conference baseball standings
	Conf.						Overall
Team	W		L		T	PCT	W		L		T	PCT
No. 30 St. John's ‍†‍‍^{y}	18	–	2	–	0	.900	34	–	14	–	1	.704
Villanova ‍‍‡‍^{y}	12	–	8	–	0	.600	37	–	15	–	1	.708
Providence ‍‍‍	12	–	8	–	0	.600	35	–	16	–	1	.683
Boston College ‍‍‍	12	–	9	–	0	.571	23	–	19	–	0	.548
Seton Hall ‍‍‍	10	–	9	–	0	.526	26	–	19	–	1	.576
Connecticut ‍‍‍	8	–	12	–	0	.400	16	–	25	–	1	.393
Pittsburgh ‍‍‍	4	–	15	–	0	.211	15	–	30	–	0	.333
Georgetown ‍‍‍	4	–	17	–	0	.190	10	–	32	–	0	.238
† – Conference champion ‡ – Tournament champion y – Invited to the NCAA tournament As of June 30, 1991; Rankings from Collegiate Baseball

1991 Big South Conference baseball standings
	Conf.						Overall
Team	W		L		T	PCT	W		L		T	PCT
Coastal Carolina ‍†‍‡‍^{y}	15	–	5	–	0	.750	36	–	29	–	0	.554
Augusta State ‍‍‍	13	–	5	–	0	.722	27	–	30	–	0	.474
Davidson ‍‍‍	10	–	8	–	0	.556	23	–	29	–	0	.442
Winthrop ‍‍‍	10	–	8	–	0	.556	22	–	22	–	0	.500
UNC Asheville ‍‍‍	7	–	8	–	0	.467	19	–	29	–	0	.396
Radford ‍‍‍	8	–	11	–	0	.421	19	–	33	–	4	.375
Charleston Southern ‍‍‍	5	–	14	–	0	.263	17	–	30	–	0	.362
Campbell ‍‍‍	5	–	14	–	0	.263	11	–	40	–	1	.221
† – Conference champion ‡ – Tournament champion y – Invited to the NCAA tournament As of June 30, 1991; Rankings from Collegiate Baseball

1991 Big Ten Conference baseball standings
	Conf.				Overall
Team	W		L	PCT	W		L	PCT
No. 21 Ohio State ‍†‍‡‍^{y}	20	–	8	.714	53	–	13	.803
Minnesota ‍‍‍^{y}	18	–	10	.643	37	–	27	.578
Indiana ‍‍‍	15	–	12	.556	38	–	23	.623
Northwestern ‍‍‍	15	–	12	.556	27	–	28	.491
Michigan ‍‍‍	15	–	13	.536	34	–	23	.596
Purdue ‍‍‍	14	–	14	.500	35	–	21	.625
Illinois ‍‍‍	13	–	15	.464	26	–	30	.464
Michigan State ‍‍‍	12	–	16	.429	28	–	25	.528
Iowa ‍‍‍	11	–	17	.393	26	–	28	.481
Wisconsin ‍‍‍	6	–	22	.214	16	–	36	.308
x – Division champion ‡ – Tournament champion y – Invited to the NCAA tournament As of June 30, 1991; Rankings from Collegiate Baseball

1991 Big West Conference baseball standings
	Conf.						Overall
Team	W		L		T	PCT	W		L		T	PCT
No. 6 Fresno State ‍†‍‍^{y}	15	–	6	–	0	.714	42	–	23	–	0	.646
Cal State Fullerton ‍‍‍^{y}	15	–	6	–	0	.714	34	–	22	–	0	.607
No. 5 Long Beach State ‍‍‍^{y}	14	–	7	–	0	.667	45	–	22	–	0	.672
UNLV ‍‍‍	11	–	10	–	0	.524	30	–	25	–	0	.545
UC Santa Barbara ‍‍‍	8	–	13	–	0	.381	33	–	25	–	1	.568
Pacific ‍‍‍	8	–	13	–	0	.381	22	–	31	–	0	.415
San Jose State ‍‍‍	7	–	14	–	0	.333	25	–	30	–	0	.455
UC Irvine ‍‍‍	6	–	15	–	0	.286	24	–	32	–	0	.429
† – Conference champion y – Invited to the NCAA tournament As of June 30, 1991; Rankings from Collegiate Baseball

1991 Colonial Athletic Association baseball standings
	Conf.						Overall
Team	W		L		T	PCT	W		L		T	PCT
Richmond ‍†‍‍	15	–	2	–	0	.882	31	–	20	–	0	.608
UNC Wilmington ‍‍‍	11	–	9	–	0	.550	25	–	27	–	0	.481
East Carolina ‍‍‡‍^{y}	9	–	8	–	0	.529	30	–	24	–	1	.555
James Madison ‍‍‍	7	–	9	–	0	.438	25	–	23	–	0	.521
George Mason ‍‍‍	4	–	11	–	0	.267	30	–	27	–	0	.526
William & Mary ‍‍‍	4	–	11	–	0	.267	13	–	27	–	0	.325
† – Conference champion ‡ – Tournament champion y – Invited to the NCAA tournament As of June 30, 1991; Rankings from Collegiate Baseball

1991 Metro Conference baseball standings
	Conf.				Overall
Team	W		L	PCT	W		L	PCT
No. 3 Florida State ‍†‍‡‍^{y}	15	–	5	.750	57	–	14	.803
No. 24 Southern Miss ‍‍‡‍^{y}	15	–	6	.714	42	–	24	.636
Tulane ‍‍‍	12	–	8	.600	36	–	18	.667
South Carolina ‍‍‍	11	–	9	.550	42	–	20	.677
Virginia Tech ‍‍‍	9	–	11	.450	24	–	30	.444
Memphis State ‍‍‍	8	–	10	.444	30	–	24	.556
Louisville ‍‍‍	8	–	12	.400	32	–	30	.516
Cincinnati ‍‍‍	2	–	19	.095	28	–	30	.483
† – Conference champion ‡ – Tournament champion y – Invited to the NCAA tournament As of June 30, 1991; Rankings from Collegiate Baseball

1991 Mid-Continent Conference baseball standings
	Conf.						Overall
Team	W		L		T	PCT	W		L		T	PCT
Blue Division
Akron ^{x}‍‍‡‍	12	–	5	–	0	.706	38	–	21	–	1	.642
UIC ‍‍‍	11	–	6	–	0	.647	25	–	30	–	0	.455
Valparaiso ‍‍‍	7	–	8	–	0	.467	20	–	39	–	2	.344
Cleveland State ‍‍‍	2	–	10	–	0	.167	19	–	22	–	0	.463
Gray Division
Eastern Illinois ^{x}‍‍‍	9	–	2	–	0	.818	27	–	32	–	0	.458
Western Illinois ‍‍‍	5	–	5	–	0	.500	21	–	23	–	0	.477
Northern Iowa ‍‍‍	1	–	9	–	0	.100	13	–	44	–	0	.228
‡ – Tournament champion As of June 30, 1991; Rankings from Collegiate Baseball

1991 Midwestern Collegiate Conference baseball standings
	Conf.						Overall
Team	W		L		T	PCT	W		L		T	PCT
Evansville ‍†‍‍	19	–	5	–	0	.792	40	–	18	–	1	.686
Notre Dame ‍‍‡‍^{y}	18	–	5	–	0	.783	45	–	16	–	0	.738
Detroit ‍‍‍	18	–	6	–	0	.750	36	–	19	–	1	.652
Saint Louis ‍‍‍	9	–	14	–	0	.391	21	–	40	–	0	.344
Butler ‍‍‍	8	–	15	–	0	.348	16	–	36	–	0	.308
Xavier ‍‍‍	6	–	17	–	0	.261	23	–	39	–	0	.371
Dayton ‍‍‍	4	–	20	–	0	.167	21	–	38	–	1	.358
† – Conference champion ‡ – Tournament champion y – Invited to the NCAA Tournament; As of June 30, 1991; Rankings from Collegiate Baseball

1991 Missouri Valley Conference baseball standings
	Conf.				Overall
Team	W		L	PCT	W		L	PCT
No. 2 Wichita State ‍†‍‡‍^{y}	21	–	3	.875	66	–	13	.835
No. 3 Creighton ‍‍‍^{y}	16	–	8	.667	51	–	22	.699
Indiana State ‍‍‍	15	–	9	.625	42	–	23	.646
Southwest Missouri State ‍‍‍	14	–	10	.583	40	–	22	.645
Bradley ‍‍‍	7	–	17	.292	26	–	36	.419
Southern Illinois ‍‍‍	6	–	18	.250	27	–	36	.429
Illinois State ‍‍‍	5	–	19	.208	27	–	33	.450
† – Conference champion ‡ – Tournament champion y – Invited to the NCAA tournament As of June 30, 1991; Rankings from Collegiate Baseball

1991 Pacific-10 Conference baseball standings
	Conf.				Overall
Team	W		L	PCT	W		L	PCT
Northern
Washington State ^{x}‍‍‍	14	–	6	.700	37	–	25	.597
Oregon State ‍‍‍	12	–	8	.600	28	–	20	.583
Portland ‍‍‍	11	–	9	.550	32	–	19	.627
Gonzaga ‍‍‍	8	–	12	.400	23	–	25	.479
Washington ‍‍‍	8	–	12	.400	39	–	21	.650
Portland State ‍‍‍	7	–	13	.350	29	–	24	.547
Southern
No. 7 Southern California ^{x}‍‍‍^{y}	23	–	7	.767	46	–	17	.730
No. 15 Stanford ‍‍‍^{y}	18	–	12	.600	39	–	23	.629
No. 23 California ‍‍‍^{y}	14	–	16	.467	35	–	28	.556
UCLA ‍‍‍	14	–	16	.467	37	–	27	.578
Arizona State ‍‍‍	12	–	18	.400	35	–	27	.565
Arizona ‍‍‍	10	–	20	.333	27	–	32	.458
x – Division champion y – Invited to the NCAA tournament As of June 30, 1991; Rankings from Collegiate Baseball

1991 Southeastern Conference baseball standings
	Conf.				Overall
Team	W		L	PCT	W		L	PCT
No. 1 LSU ‍†‍‍^{y}	19	–	7	.731	55	–	18	.753
No. 4 Florida ‍‍‡‍^{y}	16	–	8	.667	51	–	21	.708
No. 22 Mississippi State ‍‍‍^{y}	12	–	9	.571	42	–	21	.667
No. 25 Alabama ‍‍‍^{y}	14	–	11	.560	42	–	20	.677
Auburn ‍‍‍	14	–	12	.538	35	–	24	.593
Kentucky ‍‍‍	13	–	12	.520	41	–	20	.672
Tennessee ‍‍‍	13	–	13	.500	41	–	19	.683
Ole Miss ‍‍‍	9	–	15	.375	31	–	24	.564
Vanderbilt ‍‍‍	8	–	19	.296	29	–	28	.509
Georgia ‍‍‍	7	–	19	.269	27	–	31	.466
† – Conference champion ‡ – Tournament champion y – Invited to the NCAA tournament As of June 30, 1991; Rankings from Collegiate Baseball

1991 Southern Conference baseball standings
	Conf.				Overall
Team	W		L	PCT	W		L	PCT
The Citadel ‍†‍‍	16	–	2	.889	34	–	19	.642
Western Carolina ‍‍‍	11	–	3	.786	36	–	26	.581
Marshall ‍‍‍	9	–	7	.563	16	–	26	.381
Furman ‍‍‡‍^{y}	6	–	5	.545	26	–	26	.500
Appalachian State ‍‍‍	5	–	8	.385	28	–	21	.571
East Tennessee State ‍‍‍	5	–	13	.278	23	–	29	.442
VMI ‍‍‍	1	–	15	.063	2	–	35	.054
† – Conference champion ‡ – SoCon Tournament champion y – Invited to the NCAA tournament As of June 30, 1991; Rankings from Collegiate Baseball

1991 Southwest Conference baseball standings
	Conf.				Overall
Team	W		L	PCT	W		L	PCT
No. 11 Texas ‍†‍‡‍^{y}	14	–	7	.667	48	–	18	.727
No. 16 Texas A&M ‍‍‍^{y}	13	–	8	.619	44	–	23	.657
No. 29 Baylor ‍‍‍^{y}	12	–	9	.571	40	–	20	.667
TCU ‍‍‍	10	–	11	.476	34	–	25	.576
Arkansas ‍‍‍	10	–	11	.476	40	–	22	.645
Houston ‍‍‍	10	–	11	.476	37	–	19	.661
Texas Tech ‍‍‍	9	–	12	.429	42	–	18	.700
Rice ‍‍‍	6	–	15	.286	16	–	34	.320
† – Conference champion ‡ – Tournament champion y – Invited to the NCAA tournament As of June 30, 1991; Rankings from Collegiate Baseball

1991 Trans America Athletic Conference baseball standings
	Conf.						Overall
Team	W		L		T	PCT	W		L		T	PCT
East
Stetson ^{x}‍†‍‍	13	–	5	–	0	.722	36	–	22	–	1	.619
FIU ‍‍‡‍^{y}	11	–	7	–	0	.611	43	–	23	–	0	.652
Georgia Southern ‍‍‍	10	–	8	–	0	.556	33	–	27	–	0	.550
Mercer ‍‍‍	2	–	16	–	0	.111	15	–	31	–	0	.326
West
Samford ^{x}‍‍‍	9	–	5	–	0	.643	23	–	26	–	0	.469
Centenary ‍‍‍	7	–	7	–	0	.500	28	–	23	–	0	.549
Arkansas–Little Rock ‍‍‍	6	–	10	–	0	.375	28	–	27	–	0	.509
x – Division champion † – Conference champion ‡ – Tournament champion y – Invited to the NCAA tournament As of June 30, 1991; Rankings from Collegiate Baseball

== College World Series ==
The 1991 season marked the forty fifth NCAA baseball tournament, which culminated with the eight team College World Series. The College World Series was held in Omaha, Nebraska. The eight teams played a double-elimination format, with LSU claiming their first championship with a 6–3 win over Wichita State in the final.

First round	Second round
1	Florida State	3
8	Fresno State	6
8	Fresno State	3
4	LSU	15
4	LSU	8
5	Florida	1
Bracket One
1	Florida State	0
5	Florida	5
8	Fresno State	1
5	Florida	2
2	Clemson	4
7	Creighton	8
7	Creighton	2
3	Wichita State	3^{12}
3	Wichita State	8
6	Long Beach State	5
Bracket Two
6	Long Beach State	12
2	Clemson	11
7	Creighton	13
6	Long Beach State	4

Semifinals
4	LSU	19	—
5	Florida	8	—
3	Wichita State	11	—
7	Creighton	3	—

Finals
4	LSU	6
3	Wichita State	3
