= Hymel =

Hymel is both a surname and a given name. Notable people with the name include:

- Bryan Hymel (born 1979), American opera singer
- Gary Hymel, American baseball player
- Hymel Hunt (born 1993), Australian rugby player
- Shelley Hymel, Canadian psychologist
