= 1991 Midwestern Collegiate Conference baseball tournament =

- Teams: 7
- Format: Double-elimination
- Finals site: Stanley Coveleski Regional Stadium; South Bend, Indiana
- Champions: Notre Dame (2nd title)
- Winning coach: Pat Murphy (2nd title)

1991 Midwestern Collegiate Conference baseball standings
	Conf.						Overall
Team	W		L		T	PCT	W		L		T	PCT
Evansville ‍†‍‍	19	–	5	–	0	.792	40	–	18	–	1	.686
Notre Dame ‍‍‡‍^{y}	18	–	5	–	0	.783	45	–	16	–	0	.738
Detroit ‍‍‍	18	–	6	–	0	.750	36	–	19	–	1	.652
Saint Louis ‍‍‍	9	–	14	–	0	.391	21	–	40	–	0	.344
Butler ‍‍‍	8	–	15	–	0	.348	16	–	36	–	0	.308
Xavier ‍‍‍	6	–	17	–	0	.261	23	–	39	–	0	.371
Dayton ‍‍‍	4	–	20	–	0	.167	21	–	38	–	1	.358
† – Conference champion ‡ – Tournament champion y – Invited to the NCAA Tournament; As of June 30, 1991; Rankings from Collegiate Baseball

The 1991 Midwestern Collegiate Conference baseball tournament took place in May 1991, near the close of the 1991 NCAA Division I baseball season. All seven of the league's teams met in the double-elimination tournament held at Stanley Coveleski Regional Stadium home stadium of Notre Dame in South Bend, Indiana. Top seeded Notre Dame won their second league championship, also their first of four in a row. The Irish were defeated in the play-in round ahead of the 1991 NCAA Division I baseball tournament.

== Seeding and format ==
The league's teams are seeded one through seven based on winning percentage, using conference games only. The top seed received a single bye, with remaining teams facing off in the opening round.

Team	W	L	PCT	GB	Seed
Evansville	19	5	.792	—	1
Notre Dame	18	5	.783	0.5	2
Detroit	18	6	.750	1	3
Saint Louis	9	14	.391	9.5	4
Butler	8	15	.348	10.5	5
Xavier	6	17	.261	12.5	6
Dayton	4	20	.167	15	7

== Bracket and results ==
Upper round 1	Upper round 2	Upper final	Final
1	Evansville	5
5	Butler	4
4	Saint Louis	2
5	Butler	5
1	Evansville	9
2	Notre Dame	12
3	Detroit	4
6	Xavier	3
3	Detroit	7
2	Notre Dame	9
2	Notre Dame	8
7	Dayton	2
2	Notre Dame	12
1	Evansville	6
Lower round 1	Lower round 2	Lower round 3	Lower final
5	Butler	6
6	Xavier	7	6	Xavier	13	1	Evansville	6
7	Dayton	6	6	Xavier	7	6	Xavier	3
4	Saint Louis	5
3	Detroit	4
4	Saint Louis	6
