= 1991 Big South Conference baseball tournament =

- Teams: 8
- Format: Double-elimination
- Finals site: Charles Watson Stadium; Conway, South Carolina
- Champions: Coastal Carolina (2nd title)
- Winning coach: John Vrooman (2nd title)
- MVP: Buddy Cribb (Coastal Carolina)

1991 Big South Conference baseball standings
	Conf.						Overall
Team	W		L		T	PCT	W		L		T	PCT
Coastal Carolina ‍†‍‡‍^{y}	15	–	5	–	0	.750	36	–	29	–	0	.554
Augusta State ‍‍‍	13	–	5	–	0	.722	27	–	30	–	0	.474
Davidson ‍‍‍	10	–	8	–	0	.556	23	–	29	–	0	.442
Winthrop ‍‍‍	10	–	8	–	0	.556	22	–	22	–	0	.500
UNC Asheville ‍‍‍	7	–	8	–	0	.467	19	–	29	–	0	.396
Radford ‍‍‍	8	–	11	–	0	.421	19	–	33	–	4	.375
Charleston Southern ‍‍‍	5	–	14	–	0	.263	17	–	30	–	0	.362
Campbell ‍‍‍	5	–	14	–	0	.263	11	–	40	–	1	.221
† – Conference champion ‡ – Tournament champion y – Invited to the NCAA tournament As of June 30, 1991; Rankings from Collegiate Baseball

The 1991 Big South Conference baseball tournament was the postseason baseball tournament for the Big South Conference, held from May 11 through 16 at Charles Watson Stadium home field of Coastal Carolina in Conway, South Carolina. All eight teams participated in the double-elimination tournament. The champion, Coastal Carolina, won the title for the second time and received an automatic bid to the 1991 NCAA Division I baseball tournament.

== Format ==
All eight teams qualified for the tournament. The teams played a double-elimination bracket.

Team	W	L	Pct.	GB	Seed
Coastal Carolina	15	5	.750	—	1
Augusta State	13	5	.722	1	2
Winthrop	10	8	.556	4	3
Davidson	10	8	.556	4	4
Radford	8	11	.421	6.5	5
UNC Asheville	7	8	.467	5.5	6
Charleston Southern	5	14	.263	9.5	7
Campbell	5	14	.263	9.5	8

== Bracket and results ==
Upper round 1	Upper round 2	Upper final	Final
1	Coastal Carolina	7
8	Campbell	3
1	Coastal Carolina	2
4	Davidson	6
4	Davidson	6
5	Radford	5
4	Davidson	2
6	UNC Asheville	5
3	Winthrop	0
6	UNC Asheville	5
2	Augusta State	3
6	UNC Asheville	6
2	Augusta State	6
7	Baptist	4	6	UNC Asheville	3	1
1	Coastal Carolina	13	8
Lower round 1	Lower round 2	Lower round 3	Lower final
2	Augusta State	3
8	Campbell	4	5	Radford	0	4	Davidson	2
5	Radford	5	2	Augusta State	1	1	Coastal Carolina	11
1	Coastal Carolina	3
1	Coastal Carolina	3
2	Winthrop	13	2	Winthrop	2
7	Baptist	3

=== Game results ===
Date	Game	Winner	Score	Loser	Note
May 11	1	(1) Coastal Carolina	7 – 3	(8) Campbell	
May 11	2	(4) Davidson	6 – 5	(5) Radford	
May 11	3	(2) Augusta State	6 – 4	(7) Baptist	
May 11	4	(6) UNC Asheville	5 – 0	(3) Winthrop	
May 12	5	(4) Davidson	6 – 2	(1) Coastal Carolina	
May 12	6	(3) Winthrop	13 – 3	(7) Baptist	Baptist eliminated
May 12	7	(5) Radford	5 – 4	(8) Campbell	Campbell eliminated
May 13	8	(6) UNC Asheville	6 – 3	(2) Augusta State	
May 13	9	(1) Coastal Carolina	2 – 1	(3) Winthrop	Winthrop eliminated
May 13	10	(2) Augusta State	3 – 0	(5) Radford	Radford eliminated
May 13	11	(6) UNC Asheville	5 – 2	(4) Davidson	
May 14	13	(1) Coastal Carolina	3 –1	(2) Augusta State	Augusta State eliminated
May 14	14	(1) Coastal Carolina	11 – 2	(4) Davidson	Davidson eliminated
May 15	16	(1) Coastal Carolina	13 – 3	(6) UNC Asheville	
May 15	17	(1) Coastal Carolina	8 – 1	(6) UNC Asheville	Coastal Carolina wins Big South Tournament

== All-Tournament Team ==
Name	School
Chris Hodge	Augusta State
Rob Jackson	Augusta State
Mo Montenegro	Augusta State
J.C. Hendrix	Campbell
Buddy Cribb	Coastal Carolina
Chris Hanrahan	Coastal Carolina
Chris Missler	Coastal Carolina
Pearce Taylor	Coastal Carolina
Rick Bender	Davidson
Ralph Isernia	Davidson
Dave Williams	Davidson
Donnie Just	Radford
Marc Rosenbalm	UNC Asheville
Donald Gilbert	Winthrop
Tim Sherif	Winthrop
Erik Violette	Winthrop

=== Most Valuable Player ===
Buddy Cribb was named Tournament Most Valuable Player. Cribb was a first baseman for Coastal Carolina.
