= Kennie =

Kennie is both a masculine given name and a surname. Notable people with the name include:

- Kennie Childers, American NASCAR team owner
- Kennie Chopart (born 1990), Danish footballer
- Kennie MacAskill (born 1933), Canadian politician
- Kennie Steenstra (born 1970), American baseball player and coach
- George Kennie (1904–1994), English cricketer
