= 1991 Colonial Athletic Association baseball tournament =

American college baseball tournament

- Teams: 6
- Format: Double-elimination tournament
- Finals site: Harrington Field; Greenville, North Carolina
- Champions: East Carolina (4th title)
- Winning coach: Gary Overton (4th title)
- MVP: David Leisten (East Carolina)

1991 Colonial Athletic Association baseball standings
	Conf.						Overall
Team	W		L		T	PCT	W		L		T	PCT
Richmond ‍†‍‍	15	–	2	–	0	.882	31	–	20	–	0	.608
UNC Wilmington ‍‍‍	11	–	9	–	0	.550	25	–	27	–	0	.481
East Carolina ‍‍‡‍^{y}	9	–	8	–	0	.529	30	–	24	–	1	.555
James Madison ‍‍‍	7	–	9	–	0	.438	25	–	23	–	0	.521
George Mason ‍‍‍	4	–	11	–	0	.267	30	–	27	–	0	.526
William & Mary ‍‍‍	4	–	11	–	0	.267	13	–	27	–	0	.325
† – Conference champion ‡ – Tournament champion y – Invited to the NCAA tournament As of June 30, 1991; Rankings from Collegiate Baseball

The 1991 Colonial Athletic Association baseball tournament was held at Harrington Field on the campus of East Carolina in Greenville, North Carolina, from May 14 through 17. The event determined the champion of the Colonial Athletic Association for the 1991 season. Third-seeded East Carolina won the tournament for the fourth time, and third in a row, and earned the CAA's automatic bid to the 1991 NCAA Division I baseball tournament.

Entering the event, East Carolina had won the most championships, with three, including the previous two. George Mason and Richmond had each won once.

== Format and seeding ==
The CAA's six teams were seeded one to six based on winning percentage from the conference's round robin regular season. They played a double-elimination tournament with first round matchups of the top and bottom seeds, second and fifth seeds, and third and fourth seeds.

Team	W	L	Pct.	GB	Seed
Richmond	15	2	.882	—	1
UNC Wilmington	11	9	.550	5.5	2
East Carolina	9	8	.529	6	3
James Madison	7	9	.438	6.5	4
George Mason	4	11	.267	10	5
William & Mary	4	11	.267	10	6

== Bracket and results ==
First round
1	Richmond	6
6	William & Mary	5
3	East Carolina	9
4	James Madison	8
2	UNC Wilmington	7
5	George Mason	9^{10}

Second round
1	Richmond	11
2	UNC Wilmington	6
3	East Carolina	6
5	George Mason	13
6	William & Mary	7
4	James Madison	12

Third round
1	Richmond	9
5	George Mason	8
3	East Carolina	9
4	James Madison	6

Semifinals
5	George Mason	5
3	East Carolina	8

Final
1	Richmond	2	7
3	East Carolina	4	14

== Most Valuable Player ==
David Leisten was named Tournament Most Valuable Player. Leisten was an outfielder for East Carolina.
