= 1991 Trans America Athletic Conference baseball tournament =

American college baseball tournament

- Teams: 4
- Format: Double-elimination
- Finals site: Conrad Park; DeLand, Florida
- Champions: FIU (1st title)
- Winning coach: Danny Price (1st title)
- MVP: Kevin Lucero (FIU)

1991 Trans America Athletic Conference baseball standings
| | Conf. | | | | | | Overall |
| Team | W | | L | | T | PCT | W | | L | | T | PCT |
|---|---|---|---|---|---|---|---|---|---|---|---|---|
East
| Stetson ^{x}‍†‍‍ | 13 | – | 5 | – | 0 | .722 | 36 | – | 22 | – | 1 | .619 |
| FIU ‍‍‡‍^{y} | 11 | – | 7 | – | 0 | .611 | 43 | – | 23 | – | 0 | .652 |
| Georgia Southern ‍‍‍ | 10 | – | 8 | – | 0 | .556 | 33 | – | 27 | – | 0 | .550 |
| Mercer ‍‍‍ | 2 | – | 16 | – | 0 | .111 | 15 | – | 31 | – | 0 | .326 |
West
| Samford ^{x}‍‍‍ | 9 | – | 5 | – | 0 | .643 | 23 | – | 26 | – | 0 | .469 |
| Centenary ‍‍‍ | 7 | – | 7 | – | 0 | .500 | 28 | – | 23 | – | 0 | .549 |
| Arkansas–Little Rock ‍‍‍ | 6 | – | 10 | – | 0 | .375 | 28 | – | 27 | – | 0 | .509 |
x – Division champion † – Conference champion ‡ – Tournament champion y – Invited to the NCAA tournament As of June 30, 1991; Rankings from Collegiate Baseball

The 1991 Trans America Athletic Conference baseball tournament was held at Conrad Park on the campus of Stetson University in DeLand, Florida. This was the thirteenth tournament championship held by the Trans America Athletic Conference, in its thirteenth year of existence. FIU won their first tournament championship in their first year in the conference and earned the conference's automatic bid to the 1991 NCAA Division I baseball tournament.

== Format and seeding ==
The top two finishers from each division by conference winning percentage qualified for the tournament, with the top seed from one division playing the second seed from the opposite in the first round.

| Team | W | L | Pct. | GB | Seed |
|---|---|---|---|---|---|
East
| Stetson | 13 | 5 | .722 | — | 1E |
| FIU | 11 | 7 | .611 | 2 | 2E |
| Georgia Southern | 10 | 8 | .556 | 3 | — |
| Mercer | 2 | 16 | .111 | 11 | — |

| Team | W | L | Pct. | GB | Seed |
|---|---|---|---|---|---|
West
| Samford | 9 | 5 | .643 | — | 1W |
| Centenary | 7 | 7 | .500 | 2 | 2W |
| Arkansas–Little Rock | 6 | 10 | .375 | 4 | — |

== Bracket ==
Upper round 1
1E | Stetson | 9
2W | Centenary | 3
1W | Samford | 4
2E | FIU | 6
Lower round 1
2W | Centenary | 5
1W | Samford | 8

Upper final
1E | Stetson | 9
2E | FIU | 5
Lower final
2E | FIU | 10
1W | Samford | 1

Final
1E | Stetson | 7 | 2
2E | FIU | 9 | 10

== All-Tournament Team ==
The following players were named to the All-Tournament Team.

| POS | Player | School |
|---|---|---|
| P | Kevin Lucero | FIU |
| P | Jerry Santos | FIU |
| C | Bill Scalzitti | FIU |
| 1B | Mike Kash | Samford |
| 2B | Eric Cruz | FIU |
| 3B | Gary Haight | FIU |
| SS | Wes Weger | Stetson |
| DH | Nathan Harvey | FIU |
| OF | Mike Sempeles | Stetson |
| OF | Aaron Iatarola | Stetson |
| OF | Chad Ott | Samford |

=== Most Valuable Player ===
Kevin Lucero was named Tournament Most Valuable Player. Lucero was a pitcher for FIU.
