= 1991 ACC tournament =

1991 ACC tournament may refer to:

- 1991 ACC men's basketball tournament
- 1991 ACC women's basketball tournament
- 1991 ACC men's soccer tournament
- 1991 ACC women's soccer tournament
- 1991 Atlantic Coast Conference baseball tournament
