= 1991 Clemson Tigers baseball team =

American college baseball season

1991 Clemson Tigers baseball

ACC tournament champions Northeast Regional champions

College World Series, 0–2
- Conference: Atlantic Coast Conference
- CB: No. 8
- Record: 60–10 (18–3 ACC)
- Head coach: Bill Wilhelm (34th season)
- Assistant coaches: Kurt Seibert (3rd season); Dick Grapenthin (2nd season); Randy Mazey (2nd season)
- Home stadium: Beautiful Tiger Field

1991 Atlantic Coast Conference baseball standings
	Conf.				Overall
Team	W		L	PCT	W		L	PCT
No. 8 Clemson ‍†‍‡‍^{y}	18	–	3	.857	60	–	10	.857
No. 26 Georgia Tech ‍‍‍^{y}	12	–	8	.600	42	–	26	.618
No. 27 NC State ‍‍‍^{y}	11	–	10	.524	48	–	20	.706
North Carolina ‍‍‍	10	–	10	.500	36	–	23	.610
Wake Forest ‍‍‍	10	–	10	.500	37	–	22	.627
Virginia ‍‍‍	10	–	11	.476	28	–	27	.509
Duke ‍‍‍	6	–	15	.286	24	–	27	.471
Maryland ‍‍‍	5	–	15	.250	29	–	27	.518
† – Conference champion ‡ – Tournament champion y – Invited to the NCAA tournament As of June 30, 1991; Rankings from Collegiate Baseball

The 1991 Clemson Tigers baseball team represented Clemson University in the 1991 NCAA Division I baseball season. The team played their home games at Beautiful Tiger Field in Clemson, South Carolina.

The team was coached by Bill Wilhelm, who completed his thirty-fourth season at Clemson. The Tigers reached the 1991 College World Series, their sixth appearance in Omaha.

== Roster ==
1991 Clemson Tigers roster
Pitchers: - Jason Angel - Sophomore; - Eric Bradford; - Paxton Briley; - Mike Holtz; - Aaron Jersild - Junior; - Chet Kendall; - Mike Kimbrell - Senior; - Scott Miller; - Mike Moschella; - John A. Pawloski; - Tim Peele; - Chad Phillips	Catchers: - Jim Anderson - Senior; Infielders: - Jim Crowley - Senior; - Eric Macrina - Senior; - Jeff Miller - Sophomore; - Todd Stefan - Senior; Outfielders: - Billy McMillon - Freshman; - Kevin Northrup - Junior; - Michael Spiers - Senior	Unknown: - Fred Daniels; - Joe DeBerry - Junior; - Chuck Foster; - Trent Hackle; - Mike Lockhart; - Scott Melzer; - Jeff Morris; - Tad Smith; - Ryan Stidham; - Keith Williams

== Schedule ==
Legend
	Clemson win
	Clemson loss
**Bold**	Clemson team member
*	Non-Conference game

1991 Clemson Tigers baseball game log
Regular season

February
Date	Opponent	Site/stadium	Score	Overall record	ACC record
Feb 16	at Georgia Southern*	J. I. Clements Stadium • Statesboro, GA	**W** 10–4	1–0	
Feb 17	at Georgia Southern*	J. I. Clements Stadium • Statesboro, GA	**W** 16–3	2–0	
Feb 23	Auburn*	Beautiful Tiger Field • Clemson, SC	**W** 6–4	3–0	
Feb 24	Auburn*	Beautiful Tiger Field • Clemson, SC	**W** 7–3	4–0	
Feb 25	East Tennessee State*	Beautiful Tiger Field • Clemson, SC	**W** 13–0	5–0	
Feb 28	vs Oklahoma State*	Roger Barnson Field • Paradise, NV	**W** 6–0	6–0	

March
Date	Opponent	Site/stadium	Score	Overall record	ACC record
Mar 2	vs Southwestern Louisiana*	Roger Barnson Field • Paradise, NV	**L** 8–13	6–1	
Mar 2	at UNLV*	Roger Barnson Field • Paradise, NV	**W** 14–3	7–1	
Mar 3	vs Southwestern Louisiana*	Roger Barnson Field • Paradise, NV	**W** 17–5	8–1	
Mar 7	Georgia Regents*	Beautiful Tiger Field • Clemson, SC	**W** 9–0	9–1	
Mar 9	at Wake Forest	Gene Hooks Stadium • Winston-Salem, NC	**L** 10–11^{7}	9–2	0–1
Mar 9	at Wake Forest	Gene Hooks Stadium • Winston-Salem, NC	**W** 13–7^{7}	10–2	1–1
Mar 10	at Wake Forest	Gene Hooks Stadium • Winston-Salem, NC	**W** 11–5	11–2	2–1
Mar 15	Virginia	Beautiful Tiger Field • Clemson, SC	**W** 5–2	12–2	3–1
Mar 16	Virginia	Beautiful Tiger Field • Clemson, SC	**W** 15–1	13–2	4–1
Mar 17	Virginia	Beautiful Tiger Field • Clemson, SC	**W** 12–8	14–2	5–1
Mar 19	at Coastal Carolina*	Charles Watson Stadium • Conway, SC	**W** 23–7	15–2	
Mar 20	at Coastal Carolina*	Charles Watson Stadium • Conway, SC	**W** 10–3	16–2	
Mar 21	at Coastal Carolina*	Charles Watson Stadium • Conway, SC	**W** 11–7	17–2	
Mar 22	at South Carolina*	Sarge Frye Field • Columbia, SC	**L** 4–12	17–3	
Mar 23	at South Carolina*	Sarge Frye Field • Columbia, SC	**L** 10–11	17–4	
Mar 24	at South Carolina*	Sarge Frye Field • Columbia, SC	**W** 5–3	18–4	
Mar 26	The Citadel*	Beautiful Tiger Field • Clemson, SC	**W** 10–0	19–4	
Mar 27	The Citadel*	Beautiful Tiger Field • Clemson, SC	**W** 12–3	20–4	
Mar 28	South Carolina*	Beautiful Tiger Field • Clemson, SC	**W** 7–5^{7}	21–4	
Mar 30	Columbus*	Beautiful Tiger Field • Clemson, SC	**W** 12–1	22–4	
Mar 30	Columbus*	Beautiful Tiger Field • Clemson, SC	**W** 2–1	23–4	
Mar 31	at Western Carolina*	Hennon Stadium • Cullowhee, NC	**L** 7–9	23–5	

April
Date	Opponent	Site/stadium	Score	Overall record	ACC record
Apr 2	Furman*	Beautiful Tiger Field • Clemson, SC	**W** 16–6	24–5	
Apr 3	Western Carolina*	Beautiful Tiger Field • Clemson, SC	**W** 13–3	25–5	
Apr 4	South Carolina*	Beautiful Tiger Field • Clemson, SC	**W** 10–1	26–5	
Apr 5	North Carolina	Beautiful Tiger Field • Clemson, SC	**W** 15–6	27–5	6–1
Apr 6	North Carolina	Beautiful Tiger Field • Clemson, SC	**W** 6–5^{12}	28–5	7–1
Apr 7	North Carolina	Beautiful Tiger Field • Clemson, SC	**W** 6–2	29–5	8–1
Apr 8	Winthrop*	Beautiful Tiger Field • Clemson, SC	**W** 5–0^{5}	30–5	
Apr 9	Georgia*	Beautiful Tiger Field • Clemson, SC	**W** 4–3	31–5	
Apr 10	at Georgia*	Foley Field • Athens, GA	**W** 9–1	32–5	
Apr 12	at NC State	Doak Field • Raleigh, NC	**W** 14–3	33–5	9–1
Apr 13	at NC State	Doak Field • Raleigh, NC	**L** 7–8	33–6	9–2
Apr 14	at NC State	Doak Field • Raleigh, NC	**W** 16–6	34–6	10–2
Apr 16	Appalachian State*	Beautiful Tiger Field • Clemson, SC	**W** 10–5	35–6	
Apr 17	Appalachian State*	Beautiful Tiger Field • Clemson, SC	**W** 13–0	36–6	
Apr 19	at Maryland	Shipley Field • College Park, MD	**W** 11–4	37–6	11–2
Apr 20	at Maryland	Shipley Field • College Park, MD	**W** 7–2	38–6	12–2
Apr 21	at Maryland	Shipley Field • College Park, MD	**W** 17–2	39–6	13–2
Apr 23	at Furman*	Latham Baseball Stadium • Greenville, SC	**W** 8–3	40–6	
Apr 24	Georgia*	Beautiful Tiger Field • Clemson, SC	**W** 11–8	41–6	
Apr 25	South Carolina*	Beautiful Tiger Field • Clemson, SC	**W** 7–6	42–6	
Apr 26	Georgia Tech	Beautiful Tiger Field • Clemson, SC	**W** 9–8^{10}	43–6	14–2
Apr 27	at Georgia Tech	Russ Chandler Stadium • Atlanta, GA	**W** 8–0	44–6	15–2
Apr 28	Georgia Tech	Beautiful Tiger Field • Clemson, SC	**L** 6–1	44–7	15–3

May
Date	Opponent	Site/stadium	Score	Overall record	ACC record
May 5	Duke	Beautiful Tiger Field • Clemson, SC	**W** 17–4	45–7	16–3
May 6	Duke	Beautiful Tiger Field • Clemson, SC	**W** 3–2^{7}	46–7	17–3
May 7	Duke	Beautiful Tiger Field • Clemson, SC	**W** 6–4	47–7	18–3
May 8	at Tennessee*	Lower Hudson Field • Knoxville, TN	**L** 1–11	47–8	
May 9	at Tennessee*	Lower Hudson Field • Knoxville, TN	**W** 6–3	48–8	

Postseason

ACC Tournament
Date	Opponent	Site/stadium	Score	Overall record	ACCT record
May 11	Maryland	Greenville Municipal Stadium • Greenville, SC	**W** 13–1	49–8	1–0
May 12	Wake Forest	Greenville Municipal Stadium • Greenville, SC	**W** 7–2	50–8	2–0
May 13	Georgia Tech	Greenville Municipal Stadium • Greenville, SC	**W** 6–5	51–8	3–0
May 14	Virginia	Greenville Municipal Stadium • Greenville, SC	**W** 7–4^{11}	52–8	4–0
May 14	Georgia Tech	Greenville Municipal Stadium • Greenville, SC	**W** 24–8	53–8	5–0

May
Date	Opponent	Site/stadium	Score	Overall record	ACC record
May 17	Furman*	Beautiful Tiger Field • Clemson, SC	**W** 7–2	54–8	
May 18	Furman*	Beautiful Tiger Field • Clemson, SC	**W** 8–0^{8}	55–8	
May 19	Furman*	Beautiful Tiger Field • Clemson, SC	**W** 21–1	56–8	

NCAA Northeast Regional
Date	Opponent	Site/stadium	Score	Overall record	Regional record
May 23	Princeton	Mahaney Diamond • Orono, ME	**W** 13–5	57–8	1–0
May 24	Villanova	Mahaney Diamond • Orono, ME	**W** 8–3	58–8	2–0
May 25	Mississippi State	Mahaney Diamond • Orono, ME	**W** 10–9	59–8	3–0
May 26	Maine	Mahaney Diamond • Orono, ME	**W** 13–5	60–8	4–0

NCAA College World Series
Date	Opponent	Site/stadium	Score	Overall record	CWS record
June 1	Creighton	Johnny Rosenblatt Stadium • Omaha, NE	**L** 4–8	60–9	0–1
June 4	Long Beach State	Johnny Rosenblatt Stadium • Omaha, NE	**L** 11–12	60–10	0–2
