= 1991 Florida State Seminoles baseball team =

American college baseball season

1991 Florida State Seminoles baseball

NCAA Atlantic Regional champions Metro tournament co-champions

College World Series, 0–2
- Conference: Metro Conference (1975–1995)
- Record: 54–16 (14–4 Metro)
- Head coach: Mike Martin (12th year)
- Home stadium: Dick Howser Stadium

1991 Metro Conference baseball standings
	Conf.				Overall
Team	W		L	PCT	W		L	PCT
No. 3 Florida State ‍†‍‡‍^{y}	15	–	5	.750	57	–	14	.803
No. 24 Southern Miss ‍‍‡‍^{y}	15	–	6	.714	42	–	24	.636
Tulane ‍‍‍	12	–	8	.600	36	–	18	.667
South Carolina ‍‍‍	11	–	9	.550	42	–	20	.677
Virginia Tech ‍‍‍	9	–	11	.450	24	–	30	.444
Memphis State ‍‍‍	8	–	10	.444	30	–	24	.556
Louisville ‍‍‍	8	–	12	.400	32	–	30	.516
Cincinnati ‍‍‍	2	–	19	.095	28	–	30	.483
† – Conference champion ‡ – Tournament champion y – Invited to the NCAA tournament As of June 30, 1991; Rankings from Collegiate Baseball

The 1991 Florida State Seminoles baseball team represented Florida State University in the 1991 NCAA Division I baseball season. The Seminoles played their home games at Dick Howser Stadium. The team was coached by Mike Martin in his twelfth season as head coach at Florida State.

The Seminoles reached the College World Series, their eleventh appearance in Omaha, where they finished tied for seventh place after losses to Fresno State and Florida.

== Personnel ==
=== Roster ===
1991 Florida State Seminoles roster
Pitchers: 2 - Kenny Robinson - Junior; 4 - Roger Bailey - Sophomore; 6 - Bobby Fernandes - Junior; 7 - Tim Davis - Junior; 14 - Chris Roberts - Sophomore; 16 - Ricky Kimball - Senior; 17 - John Wasdin - Freshman; 18 - John McNeese - Freshman; 29 - LaWhit Lizzmore - Junior; 31 - Bryan Harris - (redshirt) Freshman; 32 - Dave Schumacher - Freshman; 35 - Jimmy Lewis - Junior; 39 - Jeff Tibbitts - Freshman; 44 - John Nedeau - Sophomore; 77 - Matt Morgan - Freshman	Catchers: 5 - Pedro Grifol - Junior; 19 - Michele Bertoldi - Junior; 21 - Marc Dunbar - (redshirt) Sophomore; 26 - Jon Bolin - Senior; Outfielders: 12 - Garrett Blanton - Junior; 15 - Kenny Felder - Sophomore; 30 - Ty Mueller - (redshirt) Sophomore; 45 - Chris Brock - Junior	Infielders: 1 - Allen Bevis - Junior; 9 - Tony Liebsack - Junior; 10 - Link Jarrett - Freshman; 23 - Nandy Serrano - Junior; 24 - Eduardo Perez - Junior; 27 - Terrell Buckley - Sophomore; 42 - Sid Cash - Sophomore

=== Coaches ===
1991 Florida State Seminoles baseball coaching staff
- Mike Martin - Head coach - 12th year

== Schedule and results ==
Legend
Florida State win
Florida State loss
Cancelled

1991 Florida State Seminoles baseball game log
Regular season

February
Date	Opponent	Site/stadium	Score	Overall record	Metro record
Feb 1	Duke*	Dick Howser Stadium • Tallahassee, FL	W 8–5	1–0	
Feb 2	Duke*	Dick Howser Stadium • Tallahassee, FL	W 10–4	2–0	
Feb 3	Duke*	Dick Howser Stadium • Tallahassee, FL	W 9–3	3–0	
Feb 8	Arizona State*	Dick Howser Stadium • Tallahassee, FL	W 6–5^{10}	4–0	
Feb 9	Arizona State*	Dick Howser Stadium • Tallahassee, FL	W 21–5	5–0	
Feb 10	Arizona State*	Dick Howser Stadium • Tallahassee, FL	W 4–3^{10}	6–0	
Feb 14	at Arizona*	Frank Sancet Stadium • Tucson, AZ	W 15–8	7–0	
Feb 15	at Arizona*	Frank Sancet Stadium • Tucson, AZ	L 3–7	7–1	
Feb 16	at Arizona*	Frank Sancet Stadium • Tucson, AZ	L 2–3	7–2	
Feb 22	Minnesota*	Dick Howser Stadium • Tallahassee, FL	W 8–4	8–2	
Feb 23	Minnesota*	Dick Howser Stadium • Tallahassee, FL	W 12–4	9–2	
Feb 24	Minnesota*	Dick Howser Stadium • Tallahassee, FL	W 8–5	10–2	

March
Date	Opponent	Site/stadium	Score	Overall record	Metro record
Mar 1	vs New Orleans*	Louisiana Superdome • New Orleans, LA	L 0–6	10–3	
Mar 2	vs Tulane*	Louisiana Superdome • New Orleans, LA	W 3–0	11–3	
Mar 3	vs LSU*	Louisiana Superdome • New Orleans, LA	W 8–0	12–3	
Mar 5	Ball State*	Dick Howser Stadium • Tallahassee, FL	W 56–4	13–3	
Mar 6	Ball State*	Dick Howser Stadium • Tallahassee, FL	W 17–2	14–3	
Mar 7	Ball State*	Dick Howser Stadium • Tallahassee, FL	W 12–2	15–3	
Mar 9	Florida*	Dick Howser Stadium • Tallahassee, FL	W 8–3	16–3	
Mar 10	Florida*	Dick Howser Stadium • Tallahassee, FL	W 5–3	17–3	
Mar 12	Richmond*	Dick Howser Stadium • Tallahassee, FL	W 10–3	18–3	
Mar 13	Richmond*	Dick Howser Stadium • Tallahassee, FL	W 6–2	19–3	
Mar 14	Richmond*	Dick Howser Stadium • Tallahassee, FL	W 12–4	20–3	
Mar 15	Michigan*	Dick Howser Stadium • Tallahassee, FL	W 11–6	21–3	
Mar 16	Michigan*	Dick Howser Stadium • Tallahassee, FL	W 3–0	22–3	
Mar 19	Northern Iowa*	Dick Howser Stadium • Tallahassee, FL	W 11–2	23–3	
Mar 20	Northern Iowa*	Dick Howser Stadium • Tallahassee, FL	W 9–0	24–3	
Mar 21	Northern Iowa*	Dick Howser Stadium • Tallahassee, FL	W 3–0	25–3	
Mar 22	Southern Miss	Dick Howser Stadium • Tallahassee, FL	W 8–4	26–3	1–0
Mar 23	Southern Miss	Dick Howser Stadium • Tallahassee, FL	W 5–0	27–3	2–0
Mar 24	Southern Miss	Dick Howser Stadium • Tallahassee, FL	W 6–4	28–3	3–0
Mar 26	Mercer*	Dick Howser Stadium • Tallahassee, FL	W 6–2	29–3	
Mar 27	Mercer*	Dick Howser Stadium • Tallahassee, FL	W 14–5	30–3	
Mar 30	at Memphis State	Nat Buring Stadium • Memphis, TN	W 6–5	31–3	4–0
Mar 30	at Memphis State	Nat Buring Stadium • Memphis, TN	W 4–3^{11}	32–3	5–0
Mar 31	at Memphis State	Nat Buring Stadium • Memphis, TN	L 7–8	32–4	5–1

April
Date	Opponent	Site/stadium	Score	Overall record	Metro record
Apr 2	at South Alabama*	Eddie Stanky Field • Mobile, AL	L 5–6^{15}	32–5	
Apr 5	at South Carolina	Sarge Frye Field • Columbia, SC	W 4–2	33–5	6–1
Apr 6	at South Carolina	Sarge Frye Field • Columbia, SC	W 7–3	34–5	7–1
Apr 7	at South Carolina	Sarge Frye Field • Columbia, SC	L 4–9	34–6	7–2
Apr 12	Miami (FL)*	Dick Howser Stadium • Tallahassee, FL	W 5–2	35–6	
Apr 13	Miami (FL)*	Dick Howser Stadium • Tallahassee, FL	W 12–4	36–6	
Apr 14	Miami (FL)*	Dick Howser Stadium • Tallahassee, FL	W 8–5	37–6	
Apr 16	at Florida*	Alfred A. McKethan Stadium • Gainesville, FL	W 4–2	38–6	
Apr 17	at Florida*	Alfred A. McKethan Stadium • Gainesville, FL	L 3–4	38–7	
Apr 19	Louisville	Dick Howser Stadium • Tallahassee, FL	W 6–3	39–7	8–2
Apr 20	Louisville	Dick Howser Stadium • Tallahassee, FL	W 5–1	40–7	9–2
Apr 21	Louisville	Dick Howser Stadium • Tallahassee, FL	W 14–6	41–7	9–3 (Note: The Metro Conference recorded this as a forfeit.)
Apr 28	at Tulane	Tulane Diamond • New Orleans, LA	L 10–11	41–8	9–4
Apr 28	at Tulane	Tulane Diamond • New Orleans, LA	L 1–2	41–9	9–5
Apr 29	Jacksonville*	Dick Howser Stadium • Tallahassee, FL	L 4–7	41–10	

May
Date	Opponent	Site/stadium	Score	Overall record	Metro record
May 3	at Miami (FL)*	Mark Light Field • Coral Gables, FL	W 3–2	42–10	
May 4	at Miami (FL)*	Mark Light Field • Coral Gables, FL	W 4–1	43–10	
May 5	at Miami (FL)*	Mark Light Field • Coral Gables, FL	L 6–8	43–11	
May 7	Virginia Tech	Dick Howser Stadium • Tallahassee, FL	W 3–2^{12}	44–11	10–5
May 7	Virginia Tech	Dick Howser Stadium • Tallahassee, FL	W 4–1^{7}	45–11	11–5
May 8	Virginia Tech	Dick Howser Stadium • Tallahassee, FL	W 11–1	46–11	12–5
May 10	at Cincinnati	Meyers Field • Cincinnati, OH	W 15–5	47–11	13–5
May 11	at Cincinnati	Meyers Field • Cincinnati, OH	W 10–5	48–11	14–5
May 12	at Cincinnati	Meyers Field • Cincinnati, OH	W 13–9	49–11	15–5

Postseason

Metro Conference Tournament
Date	Opponent	Seed	Site/stadium	Score	Overall record	Tourn Record
May 15	(8) Cincinnati	(1)	Salem Municipal Field • Salem, VA	W 9–3	50–11	1–0
May 16	(5) South Carolina	(1)	Salem Municipal Field • Salem, VA	W 17–0	51–11	2–0
May 17	(2) Southern Miss	(1)	Salem Municipal Field • Salem, VA	L 1–3	51–12	2–1
May 18	(8) Cincinnati	(1)	Salem Municipal Field • Salem, VA	W 13–12	52–12	3–1
May 18	(5) South Carolina	(1)	Salem Municipal Field • Salem, VA	W 10–9	53–12	4–1
May 19	(2) Southern Miss	(1)	Salem Municipal Field • Salem, VA	Rained out (Note: Florida State and Southern Miss were declared co-champions of the Tournament after rain forced the cancellation of the final game.)		

NCAA Atlantic Regional
Date	Opponent	Seed	Site/stadium	Score	Overall record	NCAAT record
May 23	(6) Coastal Carolina	(1)	Dick Howser Stadium • Tallahassee, FL	W 7–0	54–12	1–0
May 24	(5) FIU	(1)	Dick Howser Stadium • Tallahassee, FL	W 6–3	55–12	2–0
May 25	(2) Alabama	(1)	Dick Howser Stadium • Tallahassee, FL	W 5–2	56–12	3–0
May 26	(2) Alabama	(1)	Dick Howser Stadium • Tallahassee, FL	W 6–5	57–12	4–0

College World Series
Date	Opponent	Seed	Site/stadium	Score	Overall record	CWS record
May 31	(8) Fresno State	(1)	Johnny Rosenblatt Stadium • Omaha, NE	L 3–6	57–13	0–1
June 2	(5) Florida	(1)	Johnny Rosenblatt Stadium • Omaha, NE	L 0–5	57–14	0–2
