= 1991 Southwest Conference baseball tournament =

- Teams: 4
- Format: Double-elimination tournament
- Finals site: Olsen Field; College Station, TX
- Champions: Texas (10th title)
- Winning coach: Cliff Gustafson (10th title)

1991 Southwest Conference baseball standings
| | Conf. | | | | Overall |
| Team | W | | L | PCT | W | | L | PCT |
|---|---|---|---|---|---|---|---|---|
| No. 11 Texas ‍†‍‡‍^{y} | 14 | – | 7 | .667 | 48 | – | 18 | .727 |
| No. 16 Texas A&M ‍‍‍^{y} | 13 | – | 8 | .619 | 44 | – | 23 | .657 |
| No. 29 Baylor ‍‍‍^{y} | 12 | – | 9 | .571 | 40 | – | 20 | .667 |
| TCU ‍‍‍ | 10 | – | 11 | .476 | 34 | – | 25 | .576 |
| Arkansas ‍‍‍ | 10 | – | 11 | .476 | 40 | – | 22 | .645 |
| Houston ‍‍‍ | 10 | – | 11 | .476 | 37 | – | 19 | .661 |
| Texas Tech ‍‍‍ | 9 | – | 12 | .429 | 42 | – | 18 | .700 |
| Rice ‍‍‍ | 6 | – | 15 | .286 | 16 | – | 34 | .320 |
† – Conference champion ‡ – Tournament champion y – Invited to the NCAA tournament As of June 30, 1991; Rankings from Collegiate Baseball

The 1991 Southwest Conference baseball tournament was the league's annual postseason tournament used to determine the Southwest Conference's (SWC) automatic bid to the 1991 NCAA Division I baseball tournament. The tournament was held from May 16 through 18 at Olsen Field on the campus of Texas A&M University in College Station, Texas.

The number 1 seed Texas Longhorns went 3–0 to win the team's 10th SWC tournament under head coach Cliff Gustafson.

== Format and seeding ==
The tournament featured the top four finishers of the SWC's 8 teams in a double-elimination tournament.

| Place | Team | Conference | | | | Overall | | | Seed |
| Place | Team | W | L | % | GB | W | L | % | Seed |
|---|---|---|---|---|---|---|---|---|---|
| 1 | Texas | 14 | 7 | .667 | - | 48 | 18 | .727 | 1 |
| 2 | Texas A&M | 13 | 8 | .619 | 1 | 44 | 23 | .657 | 2 |
| 3 | Baylor | 12 | 9 | .571 | 2 | 40 | 20 | .667 | 3 |
| 4 | TCU | 10 | 11 | .476 | 4 | 34 | 25 | .576 | 4 |
| 5 | Arkansas | 10 | 11 | .476 | 4 | 40 | 22 | .645 | - |
| 6 | Houston | 10 | 11 | .476 | 4 | 37 | 19 | .661 | - |
| 7 | Texas Tech | 9 | 12 | .429 | 5 | 42 | 18 | .700 | - |
| 8 | Rice | 6 | 15 | .286 | 8 | 16 | 34 | .320 | - |

== Tournament ==
Upper round 1
1 | Texas | 13
4 | TCU | 5
2 | Texas A&M | 9
3 | Baylor | 3
Lower round 1
4 | TCU | 3
3 | Baylor | 0

Upper final
1 | Texas | 5
2 | Texas A&M | 4
Lower final
2 | Texas A&M | 2
4 | TCU | 4

Final
1 | Texas | 8 | –
4 | TCU | 6 | –
