= 1991 Southeastern Conference baseball tournament =

- Teams: 6
- Format: Six-team double elimination tournament
- Finals site: Alex Box Stadium (1938); Baton Rouge, Louisiana
- Champions: Florida (5th title)
- Winning coach: Joe Arnold (3rd title)
- MVP: Herbert Perry, Brian Purvis (Florida)
- Attendance: 21,563

1991 Southeastern Conference baseball standings
	Conf.				Overall
Team	W		L	PCT	W		L	PCT
No. 1 LSU ‍†‍‍^{y}	19	–	7	.731	55	–	18	.753
No. 4 Florida ‍‍‡‍^{y}	16	–	8	.667	51	–	21	.708
No. 22 Mississippi State ‍‍‍^{y}	12	–	9	.571	42	–	21	.667
No. 25 Alabama ‍‍‍^{y}	14	–	11	.560	42	–	20	.677
Auburn ‍‍‍	14	–	12	.538	35	–	24	.593
Kentucky ‍‍‍	13	–	12	.520	41	–	20	.672
Tennessee ‍‍‍	13	–	13	.500	41	–	19	.683
Ole Miss ‍‍‍	9	–	15	.375	31	–	24	.564
Vanderbilt ‍‍‍	8	–	19	.296	29	–	28	.509
Georgia ‍‍‍	7	–	19	.269	27	–	31	.466
† – Conference champion ‡ – Tournament champion y – Invited to the NCAA tournament As of June 30, 1991; Rankings from Collegiate Baseball

The 1991 Southeastern Conference baseball tournament was held at Alex Box Stadium in Baton Rouge, LA from May 16 through 19. Florida won the tournament and earned the Southeastern Conference's automatic bid to the 1991 NCAA tournament.

== Regular-season results ==
Team	W	L	Pct	GB	Seed
LSU	19	7	.731	—	1
Florida	16	8	.667	2	2
Mississippi State	12	9	.571	4.5	3
Alabama	14	11	.560	4.5	4
Auburn	14	12	.538	5	5
Kentucky	13	12	.520	5.5	6
Tennessee	13	13	.500	6	—
Ole Miss	9	15	.375	9	—
Vanderbilt	8	19	.296	11.5	—
Georgia	7	19	.269	12	—

== Tournament ==
First round
2	Florida	8
5	Auburn	7
1	LSU	8
6	Kentucky	7
3	Mississippi State	15
4	Alabama	10

Second round
2	Florida	4
4	Alabama	3
1	LSU	8
3	Mississippi State	2
5	Auburn	8
6	Kentucky	5

Third round
2	Florida	7
1	LSU	1
5	Auburn	0
3	Mississippi State	1

Semifinals
3	Mississippi State	4
1	LSU	9

Final
2	Florida	8	—
1	LSU	4	—

- Georgia, Tennessee, Ole Miss, and Vanderbilt did not make the tournament.
- Due to rain that caused numerous delays, all games following the first round were shortened to seven innings.

== All-Tournament Team ==
Position	Player	School
1B	Brent Killen	Florida
2B	Paul Petrulis	Mississippi State
SS	Kevin Polcovich	Florida
3B	Chuck Daniel	Mississippi State
C	Mario Linares	Florida
OF	Brian Duva	Florida
OF	Brian Purvis	Florida
OF	Chris Moock	LSU
DH	Herbert Perry	Florida
P	B.J. Wallace	Mississippi State
P	John Pricher	Florida
Co-MVP	Herbert Perry	Florida
Co-MVP	Brian Purvis	Florida

== See also ==
- College World Series
- NCAA Division I Baseball Championship
- Southeastern Conference baseball tournament
