= 1991 Big Ten baseball tournament =

1991 Big Ten Conference baseball tournament
- Teams: 4
- Format: Double-elimination
- Finals site: Trautman Field; Columbus, OH
- Champions: Ohio State (1st title)
- Winning coach: Bob Todd (1st title)
- MVP: Keith Klodnick (Ohio State)

1991 Big Ten Conference baseball standings
	Conf.				Overall
Team	W		L	PCT	W		L	PCT
No. 21 Ohio State ‍†‍‡‍^{y}	20	–	8	.714	53	–	13	.803
Minnesota ‍‍‍^{y}	18	–	10	.643	37	–	27	.578
Indiana ‍‍‍	15	–	12	.556	38	–	23	.623
Northwestern ‍‍‍	15	–	12	.556	27	–	28	.491
Michigan ‍‍‍	15	–	13	.536	34	–	23	.596
Purdue ‍‍‍	14	–	14	.500	35	–	21	.625
Illinois ‍‍‍	13	–	15	.464	26	–	30	.464
Michigan State ‍‍‍	12	–	16	.429	28	–	25	.528
Iowa ‍‍‍	11	–	17	.393	26	–	28	.481
Wisconsin ‍‍‍	6	–	22	.214	16	–	36	.308
x – Division champion ‡ – Tournament champion y – Invited to the NCAA tournament As of June 30, 1991; Rankings from Collegiate Baseball

The 1991 Big Ten Conference baseball tournament was held at Trautman Field on the campus of Ohio State University in Columbus, Ohio, from May 15 through 19. The top four teams from the regular season participated in the double-elimination tournament, the eleventh annual tournament sponsored by the Big Ten Conference to determine the league champion. Ohio State won their first tournament championship and earned the Big Ten Conference's automatic bid to the 1991 NCAA Division I baseball tournament

== Format and seeding ==
The 1991 tournament was a 4-team double-elimination tournament, with seeds determined by conference regular season winning percentage only. Indiana claimed the third seed and Northwestern earned the fourth seed by tiebreakers over Michigan.

Team	W	L	PCT	GB	Seed
Ohio State	20	8	.714	–	1
Minnesota	18	10	.643	2	2
Indiana	15	12	.554	4.5	3
Northwestern	15	12	.554	4.5	4
Michigan	15	13	.554	4.5	–
Purdue	14	14	.500	6	–
Illinois	13	15	.464	7	–
Michigan State	12	16	.429	8	–
Iowa	11	17	.393	9	–
Wisconsin	6	22	.214	14	–

== Tournament ==
Upper round 1
1	Ohio State	10
4	Northwestern	9
2	Minnesota	15
3	Indiana	11
Lower round 1
4	Northwestern	10
3	Indiana	6

Upper final
1	Ohio State	15
2	Minnesota	5
Lower final
3	Minnesota	7
4	Northwestern	5

Final
1	Ohio State	3
2	Minnesota	2

== All-Tournament Team ==
The following players were named to the All-Tournament Team.

Pos	Name	School
P	Tim Smith	Ohio State
P	Tom Schwarber	Ohio State
C	Joe Perona	Northwestern
1B	Jeff Monson	Minnesota
2B	Jeff Anderson	Ohio State
SS	Brent Gates	Minnesota
3B	Jamie Taylor	Ohio State
OF	Jeff Kopfer	Minnesota
OF	Darren Schwankl	Minnesota
OF	Mike Stein	Northwestern
OF	Keith Klodnick	Ohio State
DH	Tom Sandt	Northwestern

=== Most Outstanding Player ===
Keith Klodnick was named Most Outstanding Player. Klodnick was an outfielder for Ohio State.
