= 1991 Fresno State Bulldogs baseball team =

American college baseball season

1991 Fresno State Bulldogs baseball

Big West champions West I Regional champions

College World Series, T-5th
- Conference: Big West
- CB: No. 6
- Record: 42–23 (15–6 Big West)
- Head coach: Bob Bennett (24th season)
- Home stadium: Pete Beiden Field

1991 Big West Conference baseball standings
| | Conf. | | | | | | Overall |
| Team | W | | L | | T | PCT | W | | L | | T | PCT |
|---|---|---|---|---|---|---|---|---|---|---|---|---|
| No. 6 Fresno State ‍†‍‍^{y} | 15 | – | 6 | – | 0 | .714 | 42 | – | 23 | – | 0 | .646 |
| Cal State Fullerton ‍‍‍^{y} | 15 | – | 6 | – | 0 | .714 | 34 | – | 22 | – | 0 | .607 |
| No. 5 Long Beach State ‍‍‍^{y} | 14 | – | 7 | – | 0 | .667 | 45 | – | 22 | – | 0 | .672 |
| UNLV ‍‍‍ | 11 | – | 10 | – | 0 | .524 | 30 | – | 25 | – | 0 | .545 |
| UC Santa Barbara ‍‍‍ | 8 | – | 13 | – | 0 | .381 | 33 | – | 25 | – | 1 | .568 |
| Pacific ‍‍‍ | 8 | – | 13 | – | 0 | .381 | 22 | – | 31 | – | 0 | .415 |
| San Jose State ‍‍‍ | 7 | – | 14 | – | 0 | .333 | 25 | – | 30 | – | 0 | .455 |
| UC Irvine ‍‍‍ | 6 | – | 15 | – | 0 | .286 | 24 | – | 32 | – | 0 | .429 |
† – Conference champion y – Invited to the NCAA tournament As of June 30, 1991; Rankings from Collegiate Baseball

The 1991 Fresno State Bulldogs baseball team represented Fresno State College in the 1991 NCAA Division I baseball season. The Bulldogs played their home games at Pete Beiden Field. The team was coached by Bob Bennett in his 24th year as head coach at Fresno State.

The Bulldogs won the West I Regional to advance to the College World Series, where they were defeated by the Florida Gators.

== Roster ==
1991 Fresno State Bulldogs baseball team
Players
Coaches

| # | Pos. | Name | B/T | Height | Weight | Year | Home town |
|---|---|---|---|---|---|---|---|
| | OF | Anthony Bonifazio | R/R | 6 ft 2 in (1.88 m) | 205 lb (93 kg) | Jr | Las Vegas, Nevada |
| | INF | Brant Brown | L/L | 6 ft 3 in (1.91 m) | 220 lb (100 kg) | RS Fr | Porterville, California |
| | | Kelly Champlin | / | — | — | Sr |
| | OF | Tim Costic | L/L | 6 ft 2 in (1.88 m) | 176 lb (80 kg) | So |
| | INF | John DaSilva | / | 5 ft 9 in (1.75 m) | 180 lb (82 kg) | Jr |
| | INF | Chris Falco | / | — | — | Sr |
| | | Eric Greene | / | — | — |
| | | Jim Greenlee | / | — | — |
| | | Jesse Hernandez | / | — | — |
| | C | Todd Johnson | R/R | 5 ft 11 in (1.8 m) | 195 lb (88 kg) | So | Fresno, California |
| 23 | RHP | Bobby Jones | R/R | 6 ft 4 in (1.93 m) | 210 lb (95 kg) | Jr | Fresno, California |
| | | Bryce Judice | / | — | — |
| | P | Bobby Kazmirski | / | — | — | Fr |
| | | Robert Marsh | / | — | — |
| | C | Wade Maxwell | / | — | — | Fr | San Jose, California |
| | | Tommy Minor | R/R | 6 ft 3 in (1.91 m) | 195 lb (88 kg) | Fr |
| | P | Johnny Najar | / | — | — | Fr |
| | OF | Mike Noel | / | — | — | Sr |
| | RHP | Jim Patterson | R/R | 6 ft 2 in (1.88 m) | 190 lb (86 kg) | Jr | Riverside, California |
| | OF | Jeff Pintar | R/R | 6 ft 2 in (1.88 m) | 185 lb (84 kg) | Jr | Tigard, Oregon |
| | INF | Phillip Romero | R/R | 5 ft 8 in (1.73 m) | 160 lb (73 kg) | Jr |
| | RHP | Robbie Saitz | R/R | 6 ft 4 in (1.93 m) | 220 lb (100 kg) | Sr |
| | LHP | Mike Salazar | L/L | 6 ft 4 in (1.93 m) | 200 lb (91 kg) |
| | RHP | Steve Soderstrom | R/R | 6 ft 3 in (1.91 m) | 215 lb (98 kg) | Fr | Turlock, California |
| | OF | Vernon Spearman | L/L | 5 ft 10 in (1.78 m) | 160 lb (73 kg) | Jr | Oakland, California |
| | INF | Martin Togher | / | — | — | Jr |
| | OF | James Wheaton | / | — | — | Sr |
| | INF | Jason Wood | R/R | 6 ft 2 in (1.88 m) | 200 lb (91 kg) | Jr | Fresno, California |

Head coach

26 Bob Bennett

Assistant coach(es)

Legend

- (C) Team captain
- (S) Suspended
- (I) Ineligible
- Injured
- Current redshirt

== Schedule ==
1991 Fresno State Bulldogs baseball game log
Regular season
February (10–5)

| # | Date | Opponent | Site/stadium | Score | Overall record | Big West record |
|---|---|---|---|---|---|---|
| 1 | February 3 | San Diego | Pete Beiden Field • Fresno, California | 5–2 | 1–0 | – |
| 2 | February 3 | San Diego | Pete Beiden Field • Fresno, California | 12–2 | 2–0 | – |
| 3 | February 5 | San Francisco | Pete Beiden Field • Fresno, California | 10–6 | 3–0 | – |
| 4 | February 8 | at Stanford | Sunken Diamond • Stanford, California | 7–1 | 4–0 | – |
| 5 | February 9 | at Stanford | Sunken Diamond • Stanford, California | 5–4 | 5–0 | – |
| 6 | February 10 | at Stanford | Sunken Diamond • Stanford, California | 3–6 | 5–1 | – |
| 7 | February 12 | US International | Pete Beiden Field • Fresno, California | 5–3 | 6–1 | – |
| 8 | February 13 | at San Diego | Pete Beiden Field • Fresno, California | 7–1 | 7–1 | – |
| 9 | February 15 | California | Pete Beiden Field • Fresno, California | 8–10 | 7–2 | – |
| 10 | February 16 | California | Pete Beiden Field • Fresno, California | 14–15 | 7–3 | – |
| 11 | February 17 | California | Pete Beiden Field • Fresno, California | 17–9 | 8–3 | – |
| 12 | February 19 | Cal Poly | Pete Beiden Field • Fresno, California | 6–5 | 9–3 | – |
| 13 | February 22 | at Hawaii | Rainbow Stadium • Honolulu, Hawaii | 8–9 | 9–4 | – |
| 14 | February 23 | at Hawaii | Rainbow Stadium • Honolulu, Hawaii | 4–5 | 9–5 | – |
| 15 | February 24 | at Hawaii | Rainbow Stadium • Honolulu, Hawaii | 17–8 | 10–5 | – |

March (11–6)

| # | Date | Opponent | Site/stadium | Score | Overall record | Big West record |
|---|---|---|---|---|---|---|
| 16 | March 2 | New Mexico State | Pete Beiden Field • Fresno, California | 4–0 | 11–5 | – |
| 17 | March 2 | New Mexico State | Pete Beiden Field • Fresno, California | 5–4 | 12–5 | – |
| 18 | March 7 | St. Mary's | Pete Beiden Field • Fresno, California | 5–0 | 13–5 | – |
| 19 | March 8 | St. Mary's | Pete Beiden Field • Fresno, California | 9–13 | 13–6 | – |
| 20 | March 9 | St. Mary's | Pete Beiden Field • Fresno, California | 10–4 | 14–6 | – |
| 21 | March 11 | St. John's | Pete Beiden Field • Fresno, California | 5–3 | 15–6 | – |
| 22 | March 12 | Indiana State | Pete Beiden Field • Fresno, California | 9–5 | 16–6 | – |
| 23 | March 13 | Iowa State | Pete Beiden Field • Fresno, California | 4–5 | 16–7 | – |
| 24 | March 15 | Virginia Tech | Pete Beiden Field • Fresno, California | 0–4 | 16–8 | – |
| 25 | March 15 | Cal State Northridge | Pete Beiden Field • Fresno, California | 1–4 | 16–9 | – |
| 26 | March 16 | Iowa State | Pete Beiden Field • Fresno, California | 4–2 | 17–9 | – |
| 27 | March 21 | Oregon State | Pete Beiden Field • Fresno, California | 3–1 | 18–9 | – |
| 28 | March 22 | Oregon State | Pete Beiden Field • Fresno, California | 3–9 | 18–10 | – |
| 29 | March 23 | Oregon State | Pete Beiden Field • Fresno, California | 2–5 | 18–11 | – |
| 30 | March 28 | at Pacific | Billy Hebert Field • Stockton, California | 6–1 | 19–11 | 1–0 |
| 31 | March 29 | at Pacific | Billy Hebert Field • Stockton, California | 6–3 | 20–11 | 2–0 |
| 32 | March 30 | at Pacific | Billy Hebert Field • Stockton, California | 18–2 | 21–11 | 3–0 |

April (12–4)

| # | Date | Opponent | Site/stadium | Score | Overall record | Big West record |
|---|---|---|---|---|---|---|
| 33 | April 5 | at UC Irvine | Anteater Field • Irvine, California | 4–1 | 22–11 | 4–0 |
| 34 | April 6 | at UC Irvine | Anteater Field • Irvine, California | 8–2 | 23–11 | 5–0 |
| 35 | April 7 | at UC Irvine | Anteater Field • Irvine, California | 6–3 | 24–11 | 6–0 |
| 36 | April 9 | Cal Poly | Pete Beiden Field • Fresno, California | 7–8 | 24–12 | 6–0 |
| 37 | April 12 | Cal State Fullerton | Pete Beiden Field • Fresno, California | 1–0 | 25–12 | 7–0 |
| 38 | April 13 | Cal State Fullerton | Pete Beiden Field • Fresno, California | 6–4 | 26–12 | 8–0 |
| 39 | April 14 | Cal State Fullerton | Pete Beiden Field • Fresno, California | 5–20 | 26–13 | 8–1 |
| 40 | April 16 | Loyola Marymount | Pete Beiden Field • Fresno, California | 4–3 | 27–13 | 8–1 |
| 41 | April 19 | at San Jose State | San Jose Municipal Stadium • San Jose, California | 4–0 | 28–13 | 9–1 |
| 42 | April 20 | at San Jose State | San Jose Municipal Stadium • San Jose, California | 0–1 | 28–14 | 9–2 |
| 43 | April 21 | at San Jose State | San Jose Municipal Stadium • San Jose, California | 9–1 | 29–14 | 10–2 |
| 44 | April 22 | at Nevada | William Peccole Park • Reno, Nevada | 4–7 | 29–15 | 10–2 |
| 45 | April 23 | at Nevada | William Peccole Park • Reno, Nevada | 11–6 | 30–15 | 10–2 |
| 46 | April 26 | UNLV | Pete Beiden Field • Fresno, California | 6–1 | 31–15 | 11–2 |
| 47 | April 27 | UNLV | Pete Beiden Field • Fresno, California | 8–5 | 32–15 | 12–2 |
| 48 | April 28 | UNLV | Pete Beiden Field • Fresno, California | 11–7 | 33–15 | 13–2 |

May (4–5)

| # | Date | Opponent | Site/stadium | Score | Overall record | Big West record |
|---|---|---|---|---|---|---|
| 49 | May 3 | at Long Beach State | Blair Field • Long Beach, California | 2–1 | 34–15 | 14–2 |
| 50 | May 4 | at Long Beach State | Blair Field • Long Beach, California | 2–6 | 34–16 | 14–3 |
| 51 | May 5 | at Long Beach State | Blair Field • Long Beach, California | 2–6 | 34–17 | 14–4 |
| 52 | May 10 | UC Santa Barbara | Pete Beiden Field • Fresno, California | 10–6 | 35–17 | 15–4 |
| 53 | May 11 | UC Santa Barbara | Pete Beiden Field • Fresno, California | 13–14 | 35–18 | 15–5 |
| 54 | May 12 | UC Santa Barbara | Pete Beiden Field • Fresno, California | 3–8 | 35–19 | 15–6 |
| 55 | May 16 | Southwestern Louisiana | Pete Beiden Field • Fresno, California | 8–6 | 36–19 | 15–6 |
| 56 | May 17 | Southwestern Louisiana | Pete Beiden Field • Fresno, California | 3–9 | 36–20 | 15–6 |
| 57 | May 18 | Southwestern Louisiana | Pete Beiden Field • Fresno, California | 10–1 | 37–20 | 15–6 |

Postseason
West II Regional (4–1)

| # | Date | Opponent | Site/stadium | Score | Overall record | Big West record |
|---|---|---|---|---|---|---|
| 58 | May 23 | Cal State Northridge | Pete Beiden Field • Fresno, California | 7–2 | 38–20 | 15–6 |
| 59 | May 24 | Stanford | Pete Beiden Field • Fresno, California | 4–2 | 39–20 | 15–6 |
| 60 | May 25 | Stanford | Pete Beiden Field • Fresno, California | 7–2 | 40–20 | 15–6 |
| 61 | May 26 | Cal State Northridge | Pete Beiden Field • Fresno, California | 2–6 | 40–21 | 15–6 |
| 62 | May 26 | Cal State Northridge | Pete Beiden Field • Fresno, California | 6–5 | 41–21 | 15–6 |

College World Series (1–2)

| # | Date | Opponent | Site/stadium | Score | Overall record | Big West record |
|---|---|---|---|---|---|---|
| 63 | May 31 | vs Florida State | Johnny Rosenblatt Stadium • Omaha, Nebraska | 6–3 | 42–21 | 15–6 |
| 64 | June 2 | vs LSU | Johnny Rosenblatt Stadium • Omaha, Nebraska | 3–15 | 42–22 | 15–6 |
| 65 | June 4 | vs Florida | Johnny Rosenblatt Stadium • Omaha, Nebraska | 1–2 | 42–23 | 15–6 |

== Awards and honors ==
Todd Johnson

- First Team All-Big West

Bobby Jones

- First Team All-American American Baseball Coaches Association
- First Team All-American Collegiate Baseball Newspaper
- First Team All-American Baseball America
- Rotary Smith Award
- Collegiate Baseball Player of the Year
- First Team All-West II Regional
- First Team All-Big West
- Big West Pitcher of the Year

Mike Noel

- Second Team All-Big West

Phil Romero

- Second Team All-Big West

Jason Wood

- Third Team All-American American Baseball Coaches Association
- First Team All-West II Regional
- First Team All-Big West
