= 1991 Wichita State Shockers baseball team =

American college baseball season

1991 Wichita State Shockers baseball

MVC champion MVC Tournament champion Midwest Regional champion

College World Series, 2nd
- Conference: Missouri Valley Conference
- CB: No. 2
- Record: 66–13 (21–3 MVC)
- Head coach: Gene Stephenson (14th season)
- Home stadium: Eck Stadium

1991 Missouri Valley Conference baseball standings
	Conf.				Overall
Team	W		L	PCT	W		L	PCT
No. 2 Wichita State ‍†‍‡‍^{y}	21	–	3	.875	66	–	13	.835
No. 3 Creighton ‍‍‍^{y}	16	–	8	.667	51	–	22	.699
Indiana State ‍‍‍	15	–	9	.625	42	–	23	.646
Southwest Missouri State ‍‍‍	14	–	10	.583	40	–	22	.645
Bradley ‍‍‍	7	–	17	.292	26	–	36	.419
Southern Illinois ‍‍‍	6	–	18	.250	27	–	36	.429
Illinois State ‍‍‍	5	–	19	.208	27	–	33	.450
† – Conference champion ‡ – Tournament champion y – Invited to the NCAA tournament As of June 30, 1991; Rankings from Collegiate Baseball

The 1991 Wichita State Shockers baseball team represented Wichita State University in the 1991 NCAA Division I baseball season. The Shockers played their home games at Eck Stadium in Wichita, Kansas. The team was coached by Gene Stephenson in his fourteenth season as head coach at Wichita State.

The Shockers reached the College World Series, finishing as the runner up to LSU.

== Personnel ==
=== Roster ===
1991 Wichita State Shockers roster
4 - Tony Mills; 5 - John Lewallen; 6 - Jose Ramos; 12 - Joey Jackson; 14 - Kevin O'Leary; 18 - Charlie Giaudrone; 20 - Spike Anderson; 21 - Kennie Steenstra; 25 - Dan Tannahill; 26 - Carl Hall	27 - Matt Klusener; 29 - Darrin Paxton; 30 - Brian Buzard; 31 - Steve Smith; 33 - John Bacon; 35 - Morgan LeClair; 36 - Matt Criss; 38 - Brian Morrow; 39 - Chad Bontrager	Pitchers: 19 - Jaime Bluma; 28 - Tyler Green; 34 - Shane Dennis; 37 - Darren Dreifort; Infielders: 1 - Billy Hall; 2 - Mike Jones; 8 - Chris Wimmer; 23 - Jason White	Catchers: 15 - Doug Mirabelli; Outfielders: 3 - Jim Audley; 9 - Todd Dreifort; 11 - Tommy Tilma; 13 - Scot McCloughan

=== Coaches ===
1991 Wichita State Shockers baseball coaching staff
- 10 - Gene Stephenson - Head coach
- 24 - Brent Kemnitz - Pitching coach
- 32 - Loren Hibbs - Assistant coach
- 42 - Gregg Miller - Assistant coach
- 16 - David Chad - Graduate Assistant Coach

== Schedule ==
Legend
Wichita State win
Wichita State loss

1991 Wichita State Shockers baseball game log
Regular season (56–12)

February (5–0)
Date	Opponent	Site/stadium	Score	Overall record	MVC Record
Feb 23	Saint Louis*	Eck Stadium • Wichita, KS	W 28–4	1–0	
Feb 23	Saint Louis*	Eck Stadium • Wichita, KS	W 11–3	2–0	
Feb 24	Saint Louis*	Eck Stadium • Wichita, KS	W 10–0	3–0	
Feb 27	Emporia State*	Eck Stadium • Wichita, KS	W 23–5	4–0	
Feb 28	Washburn*	Eck Stadium • Wichita, KS	W 27–5	5–0	

March (19–7)
Date	Opponent	Site/stadium	Score	Overall record	MVC Record
Mar 2	Eastern Illinois*	Eck Stadium • Wichita, KS	W 11–5	6–0	
Mar 3	Eastern Illinois*	Eck Stadium • Wichita, KS	W 5–0	7–0	
Mar 4	Eastern Illinois*	Eck Stadium • Wichita, KS	W 11–2	8–0	
Mar 6	Eastern Michigan*	Eck Stadium • Wichita, KS	W 6–0	9–0	
Mar 7	at Kansas State*	KSU Baseball Stadium • Manhattan, KS	L 2–3	9–1	
Mar 7	Oklahoma City*	Eck Stadium • Wichita, KS	L 7–10	9–2	
Mar 9	at Texas Tech*	Dan Law Field • Lubbock, TX	W 8–3	10–2	
Mar 10	at Texas Tech*	Dan Law Field • Lubbock, TX	L 2–4	10–3	
Mar 12	at New Mexico*	Lobo Field • Albuquerque, NM	L 6–7^{10}	10–4	
Mar 13	at New Mexico*	Lobo Field • Albuquerque, NM	W 13–10	11–4	
Mar 13	at New Mexico*	Lobo Field • Albuquerque, NM	W 11–7	12–4	
Mar 14	at New Mexico*	Lobo Field • Albuquerque, NM	L 3–6	12–5	
Mar 16	Austin Peay*	Eck Stadium • Wichita, KS	W 13–1	13–5	
Mar 17	Austin Peay*	Eck Stadium • Wichita, KS	W 16–3	14–5	
Mar 19	at Southwest Missouri State	Springfield, MO	L 6–7	14–6	0–1
Mar 19	at Southwest Missouri State	Springfield, MO	W 13–4	15–6	1–1
Mar 20	at Oklahoma State*	Allie P. Reynolds Stadium • Stillwater, OK	W 10–8	16–6	
Mar 22	at Hawaii*	Rainbow Stadium • Honolulu, HI	L 5–6	16–7	
Mar 23	vs Washington State*	Rainbow Stadium • Honolulu, HI	W 5–3	17–7	
Mar 24	vs Lewis–Clark State*	Rainbow Stadium • Honolulu, HI	W 5–0	18–7	
Mar 25	vs Hawaii–Hilo*	Rainbow Stadium • Honolulu, HI	W 5–4^{10}	19–7	
Mar 26	vs Davidson*	Rainbow Stadium • Honolulu, HI	W 3–2	20–7	
Mar 27	vs Portland State*	Rainbow Stadium • Honolulu, HI	W 11–4	21–7	
Mar 28	vs Sacramento State*	Rainbow Stadium • Honolulu, HI	W 3–2	22–7	
Mar 29	vs Portland State*	Rainbow Stadium • Honolulu, HI	W 5–0	23–7	
Mar 30	at Hawaii*	Rainbow Stadium • Honolulu, HI	W 5–2	24–7	

April (24–3)
Date	Opponent	Site/stadium	Score	Overall record	MVC Record
Apr 2	Minnesota*	Eck Stadium • Wichita, KS	W 9–7	25–7	
Apr 3	Minnesota*	Eck Stadium • Wichita, KS	W 2–0	26–7	
Apr 5	Illinois State	Eck Stadium • Wichita, KS	W 9–2	27–7	2–1
Apr 6	Illinois State	Eck Stadium • Wichita, KS	W 7–1	28–7	3–1
Apr 6	Illinois State	Eck Stadium • Wichita, KS	W 5–1	29–7	4–1
Apr 7	Illinois State	Eck Stadium • Wichita, KS	W 7–2	30–7	5–1
Apr 9	Baker*	Eck Stadium • Wichita, KS	W 14–3	31–7	
Apr 10	Oklahoma State*	Eck Stadium • Wichita, KS	W 12–0	32–7	
Apr 11	at Kansas*	Hoglund Ballpark • Lawrence, KS	L 2–6	32–8	
Apr 12	Indiana State	Eck Stadium • Wichita, KS	W 17–1	33–8	6–1
Apr 13	Indiana State	Eck Stadium • Wichita, KS	L 3–4	33–9	6–2
Apr 13	Indiana State	Eck Stadium • Wichita, KS	W 4–1	34–9	7–2
Apr 14	Indiana State	Eck Stadium • Wichita, KS	W 7–6	35–9	8–2
Apr 16	South Carolina*	Eck Stadium • Wichita, KS	W 17–6	36–9	
Apr 18	South Carolina*	Eck Stadium • Wichita, KS	W 16–2	37–9	
Apr 19	at Southern Illinois	Abe Martin Field • Carbondale, IL	W 14–3	38–9	9–2
Apr 20	at Southern Illinois	Abe Martin Field • Carbondale, IL	W 5–1	39–9	10–2
Apr 20	at Southern Illinois	Abe Martin Field • Carbondale, IL	L 2–4	39–10	10–3
Apr 21	at Southern Illinois	Abe Martin Field • Carbondale, IL	W 7–5	40–10	11–3
Apr 23	Kansas*	Eck Stadium • Wichita, KS	W 15–6	41–10	
Apr 24	at Kansas*	Hoglund Ballpark • Lawrence, KS	W 6–3	42–10	
Apr 25	Benedictine*	Eck Stadium • Wichita, KS	W 7–2	43–10	
Apr 27	Creighton	Eck Stadium • Wichita, KS	W 8–4	44–10	12–3
Apr 27	Creighton	Eck Stadium • Wichita, KS	W 8–1	45–10	13–3
Apr 28	Creighton	Eck Stadium • Wichita, KS	W 12–3	46–10	14–3
Apr 28	Creighton	Eck Stadium • Wichita, KS	W 15–5	47–10	15–3
Apr 30	Kansas*	Eck Stadium • Wichita, KS	W 11–3	48–10	

May (8–2)
Date	Opponent	Site/stadium	Score	Overall record	MVC Record
May 1	Oklahoma*	Eck Stadium • Wichita, KS	W 5–2	49–10	
May 4	at Bradley	Shea Stadium • Peoria, IL	W 8–1	50–10	16–3
May 4	at Bradley	Shea Stadium • Peoria, IL	W 4–0	51–10	17–3
May 5	at Bradley	Shea Stadium • Peoria, IL	W 14–8	52–10	18–3
May 5	at Bradley	Shea Stadium • Peoria, IL	W 7–3	53–10	19–3
May 7	Kansas State*	Eck Stadium • Wichita, KS	W 17–3	54–10	
May 9	at Southwest Missouri State	Springfield, MO	W 12–2	55–10	20–3
May 10	at Southwest Missouri State	Springfield, MO	W 3–0	56–10	21–3
May 11	at Arkansas*	George Cole Field • Fayetteville, AR	L 1–10	56–11	
May 12	at Arkansas*	George Cole Field • Fayetteville, AR	L 5–6	56–12	

Post-season (10–1)

MVC Tournament (3–0)
Date	Opponent	Site/stadium	Score	Overall record	Regional Record
May 16	Bradley	Eck Stadium • Wichita, KS	W 8–1	57–12	1–0
May 17	Creighton	Eck Stadium • Wichita, KS	W 14–1	58–12	2–0
May 18	Creighton	Eck Stadium • Wichita, KS	W 13–1	59–12	3–0

NCAA Midwest Regional (4–0)
Date	Opponent	Site/stadium	Score	Overall record	Regional Record
May 24	East Carolina	Eck Stadium • Wichita, KS	W 10–5	60–12	1–0
May 25	Baylor	Eck Stadium • Wichita, KS	W 13–7	61–12	2–0
May 26	California	Eck Stadium • Wichita, KS	W 8–1	62–12	3–0
May 27	California	Eck Stadium • Wichita, KS	W 11–5	63–12	4–0

College World Series (3–1)
Date	Opponent	Site/stadium	Score	Overall record	CWS record
June 1	Long Beach State	Johnny Rosenblatt Stadium • Omaha, NE	W 8–5	64–12	1–0
June 3	Creighton	Johnny Rosenblatt Stadium • Omaha, NE	W 3–2^{12}	65–12	2–0
June 5	Creighton	Johnny Rosenblatt Stadium • Omaha, NE	W 11–3	66–12	3–0
June 12	LSU	Johnny Rosenblatt Stadium • Omaha, NE	L 3–6	66–13	3–1
