= 1991 LSU Tigers baseball team =

American college baseball season

1991 LSU Tigers baseball

National champions Southeastern Conference champions
- Conference: Southeastern Conference
- Record: 55-18 (19-7 SEC)
- Head coach: Skip Bertman (8th year)
- Assistant coaches: Smoke Laval (8th year); Dane Canevari (1st year)
- Home stadium: Alex Box Stadium

1991 Southeastern Conference baseball standings
	Conf.				Overall
Team	W		L	PCT	W		L	PCT
No. 1 LSU ‍†‍‍^{y}	19	–	7	.731	55	–	18	.753
No. 4 Florida ‍‍‡‍^{y}	16	–	8	.667	51	–	21	.708
No. 22 Mississippi State ‍‍‍^{y}	12	–	9	.571	42	–	21	.667
No. 25 Alabama ‍‍‍^{y}	14	–	11	.560	42	–	20	.677
Auburn ‍‍‍	14	–	12	.538	35	–	24	.593
Kentucky ‍‍‍	13	–	12	.520	41	–	20	.672
Tennessee ‍‍‍	13	–	13	.500	41	–	19	.683
Ole Miss ‍‍‍	9	–	15	.375	31	–	24	.564
Vanderbilt ‍‍‍	8	–	19	.296	29	–	28	.509
Georgia ‍‍‍	7	–	19	.269	27	–	31	.466
† – Conference champion ‡ – Tournament champion y – Invited to the NCAA tournament As of June 30, 1991; Rankings from Collegiate Baseball

The 1991 LSU Tigers baseball team represented Louisiana State University in the 1991 NCAA Division I baseball season. The Tigers played their home games at Alex Box Stadium. The team was coached by Skip Bertman in his 8th season at LSU.

The Tigers won the College World Series, defeating Wichita State in the championship game.

== Roster ==
1991 LSU Tigers roster
Pitchers: 10 Mike Sirotka - Sophomore; 14 Gregg Moock - Sophomore; 23 Rick Greene - Sophomore; 28 Matt Chamberlain - Freshman; 30 Chad Ogea - Junior; 32 David Herry - Junior; 36 Ronnie Rantz - Freshman; 37 Mark LaRosa - Senior; 39 Jeff Naquin - Freshman; 41 Bhrett McCabe - Freshman; 42 Henri Saunders - Junior; 44 Paul Byrd - Junior	Infielders: 1 Tookie Johnson - Senior; 3 Andy Sheets - Sophomore; 4 Mike Neal - Freshman; 5 Luis Garcia - Junior; 12 Pat Garrity - Senior; 20 Johnny Tellechea - Senior; 24 Keyaan Cook - Freshman; Catchers: 6 Adrian Antonini - Freshman; 8 Gary Hymel - Senior; 31 Dale Adams - Freshman; 40 Tim Bauer - Junior	Outfielders: 7 Danny Zahl - Junior; 9 Chris Moock - Junior; 17 Tiger Blackwell - Freshman; 18 Jared Mula - Sophomore; 21 Lyle Mouton - Junior; 27 Rich Cordani - Senior; 29 Mike Graham - Sophomore; 33 Harry Berrios - Freshman; 35 Armando Rios - Sophomore; 23 Tracy Woodburn Freshman; Coaches: 15 Skip Bertman - 8th Season; 22 Smoke Laval - 8th Season; 11 Dane Canevari - 1st Season

== Schedule ==
1991 LSU Tigers baseball game log

Regular season

February
Date	Opponent	Site/stadium	Score	Overall record	SEC Record
February 9	Mississippi State	Alex Box Stadium	6-4	1–0	–
February 10	Oklahoma State	Alex Box Stadium	6-0	2–0	–
February 12	Louisiana Tech	Alex Box Stadium	10-3	3–0	–
February 15	Stephen F. Austin	Alex Box Stadium	5-0	4–0	–
February 15	Stephen F. Austin	Alex Box Stadium	14-3	5–0	–
February 16	Stephen F. Austin	Alex Box Stadium	9-0	6–0	–
February 22	Texas A&M	Alex Box Stadium	1-3	6–1	–
February 23	Texas A&M	Alex Box Stadium	13-8	7–1	–
February 23	Texas A&M	Alex Box Stadium	5-0	8–1	–
February 26	SE Louisiana	Alex Box Stadium	8-3	9–1	–
February 27	Southern	Alex Box Stadium	8-1	10–1	–

March
Date	Opponent	Site/stadium	Score	Overall record	SEC Record
March 1	vs. Miami (FL)	Superdome	4-3	11–1	–
March 2	vs. Florida	Superdome	6-5	12–1	–
March 3	vs. Florida State	Superdome	0-8	12–2	–
March 4	Northwestern State	Alex Box Stadium	3-7	12–3	–
March 5	Tulane	Alex Box Stadium	6-7	12–4	–
March 6	New Orleans	Maestri Field	7-5	13-4	–
March 8	at UNLV	Rebel Stadium	14-4	14–4	–
March 9	at UNLV	Rebel Stadium	1-5	14–5	–
March 9	at UNLV	Rebel Stadium	9-4	15–5	–
March 12	Notre Dame	Alex Box Stadium	3-6	15–6	–
March 13	Saint Louis	Alex Box Stadium	6-4	16–6	–
March 17	Mississippi State	Alex Box Stadium	4-2	17–6	1–0
March 17	Mississippi State	Alex Box Stadium	6-5	18–6	2–0
March 19	at Southern	Lee-Hines Field	5-2	19–6	–
March 20	at Tulane	Turchin Stadium	1-5	19-7	–
March 23	at Mississippi	Swayze Field	4-0	20–7	3–0
March 23	at Mississippi	Swayze Field	3-2	21–7	4–0
March 24	at Mississippi	Swayze Field	7-3	22–7	5–0
March 26	Louisiana College	Alex Box Stadium	2-1	23–7	–
March 27	Jackson State	Alex Box Stadium	14-4	24–7	–
March 30	at Auburn	Plainsman Park	6-2	25–7	6–0
March 30	at Auburn	Plainsman Park	3-2	26–7	7–0
March 31	at Auburn	Plainsman Park	13-8	27–7	8–0

April
Date	Opponent	Site/stadium	Score	Overall record	SEC Record
April 2	McNeese State	Alex Box Stadium	3-6	27–8	–
April 3	Nicholls State	Alex Box Stadium	6-5	28-8	–
April 6	Florida	Alex Box Stadium	6-5	29-8	9–0
April 6	Florida	Alex Box Stadium	5-3	30-8	10–0
April 7	Florida	Alex Box Stadium	12-6	31-8	11–0
April 9	at Northwestern State	H. Alvin Brown–C. C. Stroud Field	7-3	32-8	–
April 10	at Louisiana Tech	J. C. Love Field	13-6	33-8	–
April 13	at Tennessee	Lindsey Nelson Stadium	3-5	33-9	11–1
April 13	at Tennessee	Lindsey Nelson Stadium	5-6	33-10	11–2
April 14	at Tennessee	Lindsey Nelson Stadium	11-4	34-10	12–2
April 16	Centenary	Alex Box Stadium	15-2	35-10	–
April 17	at New Orleans	Maestri Field	5-2	36-10	–
April 20	at Kentucky	Cliff Hagan Stadium	7-17	36-11	12–3
April 20	at Kentucky	Cliff Hagan Stadium	7-11	36-12	12–4
April 21	at Kentucky	Cliff Hagan Stadium	3-7	36-13	12–5
April 24	NE Louisiana	Alex Box Stadium	12-3	37-13	–
April 25	SE Louisiana	Alex Box Stadium	2-15	37-14	–
April 27	Alabama	Alex Box Stadium	15-4	38-14	13–5
April 27	Alabama	Alex Box Stadium	6-8	38-15	13–6
April 28	Alabama	Alex Box Stadium	11-6	39-15	14–6

May
Date	Opponent	Site/stadium	Score	Overall record	SEC Record
May 4	Vanderbilt	Alex Box Stadium	21-5	40-15	15–6
May 4	Vanderbilt	Alex Box Stadium	8-5	41-15	16–6
May 5	Vanderbilt	Alex Box Stadium	6-11	41-16	16–7
May 11	at Georgia	Foley Field	10-4	42-16	17–7
May 11	at Georgia	Foley Field	5-0	43-16	18–7
May 12	at Georgia	Foley Field	16-7	44-16	19–7

Post-season

1991 Southeastern Conference baseball tournament
Date	Opponent	Site/stadium	Score	Overall record
May 16	vs. Kentucky	Alex Box Stadium	8-7	45–16
May 18	vs. Mississippi State	Alex Box Stadium	8-2	46–16
May 18	vs. Florida	Alex Box Stadium	1-7	46–17
May 19	vs. Mississippi State	Alex Box Stadium	9-4	47–17
May 18	vs. Florida	Alex Box Stadium	4-8	47–18

NCAA tournament: South Regional
Date	Opponent	Site/stadium	Score	Overall record
May 24	vs. Northwestern State	Alex Box Stadium	13-2	48–18
May 26	vs. Oklahoma	Alex Box Stadium	4-3	49–18
May 27	vs. Texas A&M	Alex Box Stadium	7-1	50–18
May 28	vs. Louisiana	Alex Box Stadium	8-5	51–18

NCAA tournament: College World Series
Date	Opponent	Site/stadium	Score	Overall record
May 31	vs. Florida	Rosenblatt Stadium	8–1	52–18
June 2	vs. Fresno State	Rosenblatt Stadium	15–3	53–18
June 5	vs. Florida	Rosenblatt Stadium	19–8	54–18
June 8	vs. Wichita State	Rosenblatt Stadium	6–3	55–18

== Awards and honors ==
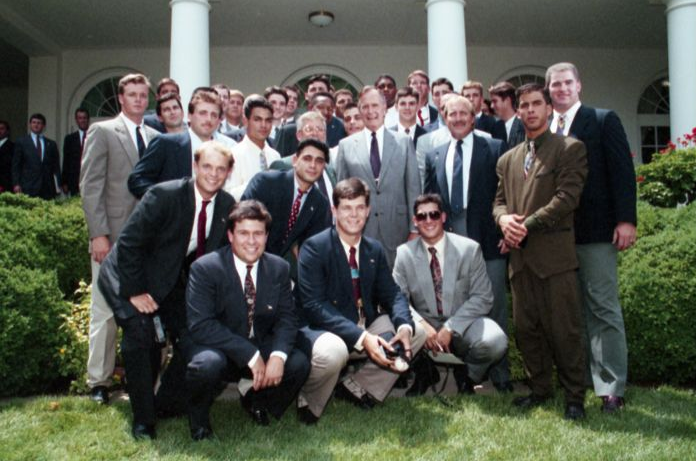
The 1991 Tigers with President George H. W. Bush at the White House

Rich Cordani

- All-SEC Second Team

Rick Greene

- All-America Second Team

Gary Hymel

- College World Series Most Outstanding Player
- College World Series All-Tournament Team
- All-SEC Second Team

Tookie Johnson

- All-SEC First Team

Chris Moock

- SEC Tournament All-Tournament Team

Lyle Mouton

- College World Series All-Tournament Team
- All-America Third Team
- All-SEC Second Team

Chad Ogea

- College World Series All-Tournament Team
- All-America Second Team

John Tellechea

- College World Series All-Tournament Team

== Tigers in the 1991 MLB draft ==
The following members of the LSU Tigers baseball program were drafted in the 1991 Major League Baseball draft.

Player	Position	Round	Overall	MLB team
Chad Ogea	RHP	3rd	86th	Cleveland Indians
Paul Byrd	RHP	4th	112th	Cleveland Indians
Lyle Mouton	OF	5th	126th	New York Yankees
Mark Larosa	RHP	8th	217th	Montreal Expos
Gary Hymel	C	14th	373rd	Montreal Expos
Chris Moock	3B	79th	1565th	New York Yankees
