= Creighton Sports Complex =

Baseball and softball venue in Omaha, Nebraska

- Interactive map of Creighton Sports Complex
- Location: Omaha, Nebraska, USA
- Coordinates: 41.265862°N 95.945047°W
- Owner: Creighton University
- Operator: Creighton University
- Capacity: 2,000 (baseball); 1,000 (softball)
- Surface: FieldTurf (baseball); SafePlay Turf (softball)
- Field size: Left Field: 330 feet (100 m); Left Center Field: 390 feet (120 m); Center Field: 400 feet (120 m); Right Center Field: 390 feet (120 m); Right Field: 330 feet (100 m) (Baseball)

Construction
- Built: 1988
- Renovated: 2000
- Closed: July 2025
- Demolished: 2026

Tenant
- Creighton Bluejays baseball (1988-2011) Creighton Bluejays softball (1988-2025)

The Creighton Sports Complex was a baseball and softball venue located on the campus of Creighton University in Omaha, Nebraska, United States. It is the former home to the softball team, members of the NCAA Division I Big East Conference, and former home of the Creighton University baseball team. The baseball team moved to TD Ameritrade Park Omaha in 2011. The softball team moved to a new facility in 2026.

The facility opened in 1988 and had a capacity of 2,000 at the baseball diamond and 1,000 at the softball diamond. Both fields were surfaced with synthetic turf.

Later in 2026, the complex was demolished to create the Creighton quad, 5.7 acres of green space for staff and students to gather outdoors.

== Layout ==
The facility contains both a baseball and softball diamond. A photo of the facility is available here. Also part of the facility is the Kitty Gaughan Pavilion, which contains offices and indoor training areas for both sports, as well as additional facilities for other Creighton sports.

== See also ==
- List of NCAA Division I baseball venues
