= 1991 Atlantic Coast Conference baseball tournament =

American college baseball tournament

- Teams: 8
- Format: Eight-team double elimination
- Finals site: Greenville Municipal Stadium; Greenville, South Carolina
- Champions: Clemson (6th title)
- Winning coach: Bill Wilhelm (6th title)
- MVP: Michael Spiers (Clemson)
- Attendance: 37,561

1991 Atlantic Coast Conference baseball standings
	Conf.				Overall
Team	W		L	PCT	W		L	PCT
No. 8 Clemson ‍†‍‡‍^{y}	18	–	3	.857	60	–	10	.857
No. 26 Georgia Tech ‍‍‍^{y}	12	–	8	.600	42	–	26	.618
No. 27 NC State ‍‍‍^{y}	11	–	10	.524	48	–	20	.706
North Carolina ‍‍‍	10	–	10	.500	36	–	23	.610
Wake Forest ‍‍‍	10	–	10	.500	37	–	22	.627
Virginia ‍‍‍	10	–	11	.476	28	–	27	.509
Duke ‍‍‍	6	–	15	.286	24	–	27	.471
Maryland ‍‍‍	5	–	15	.250	29	–	27	.518
† – Conference champion ‡ – Tournament champion y – Invited to the NCAA tournament As of June 30, 1991; Rankings from Collegiate Baseball

The 1991 Atlantic Coast Conference baseball tournament was held in Greenville, SC from May 11 through 14. Clemson won the tournament and earned the Atlantic Coast Conference's automatic bid to the 1991 NCAA Division I baseball tournament.

== Seeding ==
Team	W	L	Pct.	GB	Seed
Clemson	18	3	.857	–	1
Georgia Tech	12	8	.600	5.5	2
NC State	11	10	.524	7	3
North Carolina	10	10	.500	7.5	4
Wake Forest	10	10	.500	7.5	5
Virginia	10	11	.476	8	6
Duke	6	15	.286	12	7
Maryland	6	15	.286	12	8

== Tournament ==
Upper round 1
8	Maryland	1
1	Clemson	13
5	Wake Forest	7
4	North Carolina	2
6	Virginia	4
3	NC State	3
7	Duke	7
2	Georgia Tech	9

Upper round 2
1	Clemson	7
5	Wake Forest	2
2	Georgia Tech	9
6	Virginia	3
Lower round 1
4	North Carolina	3
8	Maryland	1
3	NC State	14
7	Duke	1

Upper final
2	Georgia Tech	5
1	Clemson	6
Lower round 2
6	Virginia	5
4	North Carolina	1
3	NC State	9
5	Wake Forest	4

Semifinals
1	Clemson	7
6	Virginia	4
3	NC State	3
2	Georgia Tech	4

Final
1	Clemson	24
2	Georgia Tech	8

== All-Tournament Team ==
Position	Player	School
1B	Pat Clougherty	NC State
2B	Jim Crowley	Clemson
3B	Andy Bruce	Georgia Tech
SS	Jason Cook	Virginia
C	Kevin O'Sullivan	Virginia
OF	Michael Spiers	Clemson
OF	Jeff Pierce	NC State
OF	Anthony Byrd	Georgia Tech
DH	Eric Macrina	Clemson
SP	Jason Angel	Clemson
RP	Scott Miller	Clemson
MVP	Michael Spiers	Clemson

(*)Denotes Unanimous Selection

== See also ==
- College World Series
- NCAA Division I Baseball Championship
