= George Kennie =

English cricketer

George Kennie (17 May 1904 – 11 April 1994) was an English first-class cricketer, who played one match for Yorkshire County Cricket Club in the Roses Match against Lancashire at Old Trafford in 1927. He also appeared for the Yorkshire Second XI from 1925 to 1927.

Born in Bradford, Yorkshire, Kennie was a right-handed middle order batsman, who was out for a duck, LBW to Dick Tyldesley in Yorkshire's first innings, and scored six runs in the second, before being bowled by Ted McDonald. Kennie took one catch in the match.

Kennie died in April 1994 in Poole, Dorset, England, aged 89.
