= Shelley Hymel =

Canadian psychologist and academic

Shelley Hymel is a developmental/educational psychologist and professor at the University of British Columbia (UBC) in Vancouver, British Columbia, Canada. Her research focuses on issues related to school bullying, children's peer relationships, and social-emotional learning.

== Biography ==
Hymel earned her Ph.D. in educational psychology from the University of Illinois in 1982. She was a faculty member at the University of Waterloo before joining the Department of Education at UBC in 1993.

Hymel is the co-founder, along with Susan Swearer, of the Bullying Research Network, a group that links more 200 researchers from more than 17 countries in the field of bullying and peer victimization.

== Awards ==
- 2015: UBC Killam Research Prize
- 2015: University of Illinois Education Alumni Association (EAA) Distinguished Alumni Award

== Selected works ==
- Hymel, S., & Swearer, S.M. (2015). Four decades of research on school bullying: An introduction. American Psychologist, 70 (4), 300–310.
- Swearer, S.M., & Hymel, S. (2015). Understanding the bullying dynamic: Moving toward a social-ecological diathesis-stress model. American Psychologist, 70 (4),344-353.
- Hymel, S. & Bonanno, R. (2014). Moral disengagement processes in bullying. Theory into Practice. 53, 278–285.
- Hymel, S., Rocke-Henderson, N. & Bonanno, R.A. (2005). Moral disengagement: A framework for understanding bullying among adolescents. Journal of Social Sciences, 8, 1-11.
- Vaillancourt, T., Hymel, S., & McDougall, P. (2003). Bullying is power: Implications for school-based intervention strategies. Special issue: Journal of Applied School Psychology, 19, 157–175.
