= Creighton Bluejays baseball =

Baseball team representing Creighton University

- 2026 Creighton Bluejays baseball team
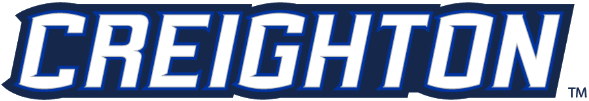
- Founded: 1951; 75 years ago
- University: Creighton University
- Head coach: Mark Kingston (1st season)
- Conference: Big East
- Location: Omaha, Nebraska
- Home stadium: Creighton Sports Complex (Capacity: 2,000) or Charles Schwab Field Omaha (capacity: 24,505)
- Nickname: Bluejays
- Colors: Blue, white, and navy blue

College World Series appearances
- 1991

NCAA regional champions
- 1991

NCAA tournament appearances
- 1973, 1990, 1991, 1992, 1999, 2000, 2005, 2007, 2011, 2012, 2019, 2025

Conference tournament champions
- MVC: 2007, 2011, 2012; Big East: 2019, 2025

Conference regular season champions
- MVC: 2005, 2011; Big East: 2014, 2017, 2019, 2025

The Creighton Bluejays baseball team represents the Creighton University in NCAA Division I college baseball, and competes as a member of the Big East Conference. Home games are played off campus at nearby Charles Schwab Field Omaha, which annually hosts the College World Series in June. The Bluejays played their first Big East baseball season in 2014, and are led by head coach Mark Kingston.

As the official host school for the College World Series (CWS), Creighton provides each of the eight participating programs with practice facilities, training assistance, and assists with game scoring. Prior to the opening of TD Ameritrade Park, the program played games at the Creighton Sports Complex and Johnny Rosenblatt Stadium in South Omaha, which was also the home of the CWS and the Triple-A Omaha Royals (now the Omaha Storm Chasers of the International League).

== 1991 College World Series ==
Creighton made its sole appearance in the College World Series in 1991; the Jays advanced to the CWS by defeating the Hawaii Rainbows 15–8 in finals of the West I Regional in Los Angeles. Prior to the victory over Hawaii, the Jays swept the four-game regional by beating Pepperdine, Minnesota, and host USC (8–7 in ten innings).

The seventh-seeded Bluejays (49–20) opened play against the second seeded Clemson Tigers in front of then record crowd of more than 16,000 at Rosenblatt Stadium. The game ended with an 8–4 Creighton victory, setting up a second round match with MVC rival Wichita State.

The Jays had finished the 1991 regular season with an overall record of 46–18, and a 16–8 record in the Missouri Valley Conference, good enough for second place behind league champion Wichita State. The Shockers had swept the regular season four-game series with the Jays, and had also defeated the Jays twice in the 1991 Missouri Valley Conference Baseball Tournament.

In one of the more memorable games in College World Series history, the Shockers defeated the Jays 3–2 in 12 innings. With one out in the bottom of the twelfth inning Wichita State center fielder Jim Audley threw out Creighton's pinch-runner Steve Bruns at home plate in a play known to Bluejay and Shocker fans alike as "the throw." The game was recently ranked third in the list of the 25 greatest games in College World Series history by the Omaha World-Herald.

The Jays bounced back to defeat Long Beach State 13–4 in an elimination game, to set up a rematch with Wichita State in the National Semifinals. A trip to the title game for Creighton was not to be, however, as Wichita State advanced to the National Championship game after defeating Creighton for the eighth time that season, 11–3.

LSU defeated Wichita State 6–3 to win the 1991 NCAA Baseball National Championship.

The Bluejays Head Coach during the 1991 season, Jim Hendry, is a former General Manager of the Chicago Cubs. Jim Hendry is also the only former Creighton Bluejay to have his number retired. His name and number (25) hang on the center field fence of Creighton Sports Complex.

== Creighton in the NCAA Tournament ==
Year	Record	Pct	Notes
1973	0–2	.000	District 5
1990	2–2	.500	Central Regional
1991	6–2	.750	West I Regional Champions, College World Series 3rd place
1992	1–2	.333	Central Regional
1999	0–2	.000	South Bend Regional
2000	0–2	.000	Tempe Regional
2005	2–2	.500	Lincoln Regional
2007	1–2	.333	Fayetteville Regional
2011	1–2	.333	Corvallis Regional
2012	2–2	.500	Los Angeles Regional
2019	3–2	.600	Corvallis Regional
2025	2–2	.500	Fayetteville Regional
TOTALS	20–24	.455	

== Alumni ==
Notable Bluejays include hall of fame pitcher Bob Gibson, Dave McKay, Pat Venditte, Dennis Rasmussen, Scott Stahoviak, Scott Servais, Zach Daeges, Chad McConnell, Alan Benes, Kimera Bartee, and Nicky Lopez. Brian O'Connor, who has led the University of Virginia to 7 College World Series appearances and the 2015 National title, pitched at Creighton from 1990-1993.

== Team Honors ==
Big East Conference Regular Season Champions (4): 2014*, 2017, 2019*, 2025

* Outright

Big East Conference Tournament Champions (1): 2019

Missouri Valley Conference Regular Season Champions (2): 2005*, 2011*

* Outright

Missouri Valley Conference Tournament Champions (3): 2007, 2011, 2012

NCAA Regionals Appearances (10): 1973, 1990, 1991, 1992, 1999, 2000, 2005, 2007, 2011, 2012, 2019

College World Series Appearances (1): 1991

== Yearly records ==
The table below reflects the yearly history of the Creighton baseball team. (note that official results were not kept until 1966)

Year	Coach	W-L	Conference	Tournament	Postseason	Other
1966	Herb Millard	12–12				
1967	Herb Millard	15–8				
1968	Herb Millard	14–8				
1969	Tony Trvdik	11–24				
1970	Larry Cochell	25–7				
1971	Larry Cochell	24–21				
1972	Dave Baker	16–17				
1973	Dave Baker	25–16			NCAA District 5 Playoffs (0–2)	
1974	Dave Baker	30–18				
1975	Dave Baker	32–12				
1976	Dave Baker	22–27–1				
1977	Dave Baker	15–16	4th	6th		
1978	Jerry Bartee	16–17	6th	5th		
1979	Jerry Bartee	17–27–1	7th	T-6th		
1980	Jerry Bartee	26–22–1	4th	T-6th		
1981	Dave Underwood	37–30	2nd (West)			
1982	Dave Underwood	32–23	2nd (West)	4th		
1983	Dave Underwood	39–17	2nd (West)	4th		
1984	Dave Underwood / Jim Hendry	23–21	6th			
1985	Jim Hendry	35–27	5th			
1986	Jim Hendry	33–29–1	5th	6th		
1987	Jim Hendry	35–24	5th	3rd		
1988	Jim Hendry	43–21–1	2nd	T-1st		All-American Catcher Scott Servais Drafted in 3rd Round by Houston Astros
1989	Jim Hendry	37–26	4th	4th		
1990	Jim Hendry	48–22	3rd	2nd	NCAA Central Regional (2–2)	
1991	Jim Hendry	51–22	2nd	2nd	NCAA West Regional I (4–0) 1991 College World Series (2–2)	All-American Scott Stahoviak Named National Player of the Year, Bluejays finish 3rd in NCAA
1992	Todd Wenberg	41–19–1	2nd	2nd	NCAA Central Regional (1–2)	
1993	Todd Wenberg	32–25	T-5th	3rd		
1994	Jack Dahm	28–29	3rd	4th		
1995	Jack Dahm	35–22	2nd	3rd		
1996	Jack Dahm	19–31–1	7th			
1997	Jack Dahm	27–27	7th			
1998	Jack Dahm	27–27–1	6th	T-5th		
1999	Jack Dahm	38–25	3rd	2nd	NCAA South Bend Regional (0–2)	
2000	Jack Dahm	38–22	3rd	4th	NCAA Tempe Regional (0–2)	
2001	Jack Dahm	21–31	7th			
2002	Jack Dahm	30–24	2nd	T-5th		Catcher Tim Gradoville 37th Round Draft Pick of Philadelphia Phillies
2003	Jack Dahm	20–37	T-6th	T-5th		LHP Tom Oldham 6th Round Draft Pick of Seattle Mariners
2004	Ed Servais	35–24	2nd	4th		RHP Steve Grasley named All-American; signs with Seattle Mariners
2005	Ed Servais	48–17	1st	2nd	NCAA Lincoln Regional (2–2)	Bluejays win first conference regular season title in school history, RHP Eric Wordekemper 46th Round Draft of New York Yankees, LHP Scott Reese named All-American
2006	Ed Servais	31–21	4th	4th		OF Zach Daeges named All-American; 6th Round Draft Pick of Boston Red Sox, LHP Marc Lewis 26th Round Draft Pick of Milwaukee Brewers, RHP Adam Schaecher 31st Round Draft Pick of Texas Rangers, OF Chase Odenreider 49th Round Draft Pick of New York Yankees
2007	Ed Servais	45–17	2nd	1st	NCAA Fayetteville Regional (1–2)	Creighton Wins Conference Tournament, Pitchers Pat Venditte and Ben Mancuso named All-Americans, LHP Marc Lewis 20th Round Draft Pick of Florida Marlins, Catcher Chris Gradoville 24th Round Draft Pick of Texas Rangers, Pat Venditte 45th Round Draft Pick of New York Yankees
2008	Ed Servais	37–21	3rd	T-4th		Pitcher Pat Venditte 20th Round Draft Pick of New York Yankees
2009	Ed Servais	31–25	4th	2nd		1B Darin Ruf 20th Round Draft Pick of Philadelphia Phillies
2010	Ed Servais	27–25	6th	6th		SS Elliot Soto 15th Round Draft Pick of Chicago Cubs, C Carson Vitale 38th Round Draft Pick of Texas Rangers
2011	Ed Servais	45–16	1st	1st	NCAA Corvallis Regional (1–2)	First Creighton baseball team to win both the MVC regular season title and MVC tournament title. P Jonas Dufek 9th Round Draft Pick of Houston Astros, OF Trever Adams 16th Round Draft Pick of Texas Rangers
2012	Ed Servais	28–30	8th	1st	NCAA Los Angeles Regional (2–2)	Creighton goes from "worst to first" in one week by going undefeated in the 2012 MVC Tournament. One of only three "four seeds" to make the regional finals of the 2012 NCAA Division I baseball tournament, before falling to No. 2 national seed UCLA. P Ty Blach 5th Round Draft Pick of San Francisco Giants, C Anthony Bemboom 22nd Round Draft Pick of Los Angeles Angels
2013	Ed Servais	30-18	3rd	8th		Final season in the MVC.
2014	Ed Servais	32-17	1st	2nd		First year in the Big East.
2015	Ed Servais	27-14	2nd	2nd		
2016	Ed Servais	38-17	2nd	2nd		
2017	Ed Servais	24-25	1st	3rd		
2018	Ed Servais	34-16	5th			Failed to make the BIG EAST or NCAA tournaments -- but swept Nebraska in the season series.
2019	Ed Servais	41-13	1st	1st	NCAA Corvallis Regional (3–2)	First Creighton baseball team to win both the Big East regular season and conference titles. Big East Pitcher of the Year, Mitch Ragan; Big East Player of the Year, Jake Holton; Big East coaching staff of the year. Took 2 out of 3 in the season series against Nebraska. Earned the #2 seed in the Corvallis Regional of the NCAA tournament. Lost their opening game versus Michigan, but then eliminated defending national champion Oregon State on their home field, Cincinnati in the first game of the regional final, and pushed Michigan to a winner-take-all final game by overcoming a 7-4 deficit in the ninth inning, plating seven runs to win 11–7. The Jays fell to Michigan 17-6 in the final game.
2020	Ed Servais	5-10				Season cancelled due to the COVID-19 pandemic
2021	Ed Servais	24-15	2nd	3rd		
2022	Ed Servais	31-18	2nd			
2023	Ed Servais	25-24	5th			
2024	Ed Servais	35-17	6th			
