= Kennie Steenstra =

American baseball player & coach (born 1970)

- Pitcher / Coach
- Born: October 13, 1970 (age 55); Springfield, Missouri, U.S.
- Batted: Right Threw: Right

MLB debut
- May 21, 1998, for the Chicago Cubs

Last MLB appearance
- June 7, 1998, for the Chicago Cubs

MLB statistics
- Win–loss record: 0–0
- Earned run average: 10.80
- Strikeouts: 4
- Stats at Baseball Reference

Teams
- Chicago Cubs (1998)
Medals
Men's baseball
Representing United States
Pan American Games
Bronze medal – third place	1991 Havana	Team

Kenneth Gregory Steenstra (born October 13, 1970) is an American former professional baseball pitcher and current coach. He played in Major League Baseball (MLB) for the Chicago Cubs. He attended Wichita State University.

== High school ==
Kennie attended Plato High School, in south central Missouri. Steenstra broke the record for being the winningest high school pitcher with 65 victories.

== Draft ==
Steenstra was selected in the 12th round, 331st overall by the Cubs in the 1992 MLB draft.

== Minor leagues ==
Steenstra was used almost entirely as a starter in his pre-major league pro career. In fact, he was used as a reliever only four times. He saw quite a bit of success in the minors, with a string of three very successful seasons between 1992 and 1994. In 1992, with the Geneva Cubs and Peoria Chiefs, he went a combined 9-3 with a 1.89 earned run average. In 1993 he went 14-6, and in 1994 he went 9-7 with a 2.61 ERA for the Orlando Cubs.

== Major leagues ==
On May 21, 1998 at the age of 27, Steenstra made his MLB debut wearing number 49 for the Cubs. In one inning against the Los Angeles Dodgers, he gave up one hit, one walk, struck out one and surrendered no runs. Overall, he finished with a 10.80 ERA in 3⅓ innings, striking out four, but giving up two home runs (the first to Javy López and the second to Magglio Ordóñez). In total, he gave up seven hits and allowed two runners to steal against him. He played his final game on June 7. During the 1998 season, Steenstra earned $170,000.

== After the majors ==
After his brief stint in the majors, Steenstra bounced around in the minors until 2002 in the Atlanta Braves, Seattle Mariners, Arizona Diamondbacks, St. Louis Cardinals, Baltimore Orioles and Florida Marlins organizations.

In between, he played winter ball with the Águilas del Zulia and Leones del Caracas clubs of the Venezuelan League during two seasons spanning 1995–1998.

Following his playing days, he has worked as a pitching coach for the Lincoln Saltdogs (2004), Delmarva Shorebirds (2005–2006) and Frederick Keys (2014).

Steenstra was hired to be the pitching coach for the Bowie Baysox, the Double-A affiliate of the Baltimore Orioles, for the 2018 season. He was promoted to pitching coach of the Triple-A Norfolk Tides prior to the 2020 season. On October 4, 2021, the Orioles dismissed Steenstra from his position.
