= Gary Hymel =

American baseball player

Greg Hymel
- Catcher

Career highlights and awards
- College World Series Most Outstanding Player (1991)

Gary Hymel is a former catcher for the LSU Tigers baseball team. He was a member of the LSU team that won the 1991 College World Series. He was voted to the 1991 CWS All-Star Tournament Team and was named the 1991 CWS Most Outstanding Player. After his college baseball career, he played from 1991-1997 for various Minor League teams.

== Amateur career ==
Prior to playing professionally, he attended Belaire High School. In 1989, he played collegiate summer baseball with the Falmouth Commodores of the Cape Cod Baseball League. He was drafted twice - the first time by the Kansas City Royals in the 8th round of the 1987 amateur draft; the second time, he was drafted by the Montreal Expos in the 8th round of the 1991 amateur draft.

== Professional career ==
Hymel played professionally from 1991 to 1997. He began his career with the Sumter Flyers, hitting .298 in 116 at-bats in 1991. in 1992, he played for the Albany Polecats, hitting .289 in 286 at-bats. He split the 1993 season with three teams - the West Palm Beach Expos, the AAA Ottawa Lynx and the Burlington Bees. He hit a combined .266 with 24 home runs and 51 RBI in 297 at-bats, he struck out 93 times but he walked only 10 times. He played the final two seasons of his career with the Harrisburg Senators and Ottawa Lynx. In 1994, he hit .249 with 12 home runs and only nine walks in 233 at-bats. In 1995, he hit .289 with 11 home runs in 302 at-bats. Overall, Hymel hit .320 with 63 home runs and 300 strikeouts in 1234 minor league at-bats. He walked only 77 times.
