= 1991 NCAA Division I baseball rankings =

1991 NCAA Division I baseball season

Tournament

College World Series
- Champions: LSU
- Runners-up: Wichita State
- MOP: Gary Hymel (LSU)

Seasons
- ← 1990 1992 →

The following polls make up the 1991 NCAA Division I baseball rankings. Baseball America began publishing its poll of the top 20 teams in college baseball in 1981. Beginning with the 1985 season, it expanded to the top 25. Collegiate Baseball Newspaper published its first human poll of the top 20 teams in college baseball in 1957, and expanded to rank the top 30 teams in 1961.

== Baseball America ==
Currently, only the final poll from the 1991 season is available.

Rank	Team
1	LSU
2	Wichita State
3	Florida
4	Clemson
5	Florida State
6	Creighton
7	Southern California
8	Long Beach State
9	Fresno State
10	Texas
11	Cal State Northridge
12	Oklahoma State
13	Ohio State
14	Hawaii
15	Stanford
16	Miami (FL)
17	Pepperdine
18	Southwestern Louisiana
19	Texas A&M
20	Maine
21	NC State
22	Notre Dame
23	California
24	Alabama
25	Southern Miss

== Collegiate Baseball ==
Currently, only the final poll from the 1991 season is available.

Rank	Team
1	LSU
2	Wichita State
3	Creighton
4	Florida
5	Long Beach State
6	Fresno State
7	Florida State
8	Clemson
9	Oklahoma State
10	Cal State Northridge
11	Texas
12	Hawaii
13	Southern California
14	Miami (FL)
15	Southwestern Louisiana
16	Texas A&M
17	Maine
18	Stanford
19	Pepperdine
20	California
21	Ohio State
22	Mississippi State
23	South Alabama
24	Southern Miss
25	Alabama
26	Georgia Tech
27	NC State
28	Missouri
29	Baylor
30	St. John's
