= Coastal Carolina Chanticleers baseball =

Baseball team of Coastal Carolina University

Coastal Carolina Chanticleers
- 2026 Coastal Carolina Chanticleers baseball team
- Founded: 1963 (62 years ago)
- University: Coastal Carolina University
- Head coach: Chris Lemonis (1st season)
- Conference: Sun Belt; East Division
- Location: Conway, South Carolina
- Home stadium: Springs Brooks Stadium (capacity: 5,400)
- Nickname: Chanticleers
- Colors: Teal, bronze, and black

College World Series champions
- 2016

College World Series runner-up
- 2025

College World Series appearances
- 2016, 2025

NCAA regional champions
- 2008, 2010, 2016, 2025

NCAA tournament appearances
- 1991, 2001, 2002, 2003, 2004, 2005, 2007, 2008, 2009, 2010, 2011, 2012, 2013, 2015, 2016, 2018, 2019, 2022, 2023, 2024, 2025, 2026

Conference tournament champions
- Big South: 1986, 1991, 1992, 2001, 2002, 2003, 2004, 2007, 2008, 2009, 2010, 2011, 2012, 2016; Sun Belt: 2018, 2019, 2025

Conference regular season champions
- Big South: 1989, 1990, 1991, 1992, 1993, 1998, 1999, 2002, 2005, 2007, 2008, 2009, 2010, 2011, 2012, 2016; Sun Belt: 2017, 2018, 2023, 2025

The Coastal Carolina Chanticleers baseball program is the college baseball team for Coastal Carolina University located in Conway, South Carolina. The program are one-time national champions, winning the 2016 College World Series.

It has been the university's most consistent program in terms of success. Former Head Coach Gary Gilmore (1,118–597–3 at CCU, 1,371–699–5 overall) led the Chanticleers to 19 NCAA Regional appearances and three Super Regional appearances since being hired in 1996. The program has hosted a regional after being a #1 seed on six occasions (2005, 2007, 2008, 2010, 2018, 2023). They have won 50+ games in 2005, 2007, 2008, 2010, and 2016. The program hosted a Super Regional in 2010.

Future Chicago White Sox major league pitcher Brad Goldberg played for the team in 2009-10, making 18 appearances (17 in relief) in those two seasons.

In 2010 Coastal went 29-0 in Big South play, winning both the regular season Big South Championship and the Big South Tournament Championship plus the Regional, but lost in the Super Regionals 2-0 to the University of South Carolina.

In 2016, Coastal went 21-3 in Big South play, winning the regular season Conference Championship and the Conference Tournament. In the 2016 post-season, Coastal won the Raleigh Regional by beating the NC State Wolfpack 2-1. The Chanticleers went on to beat the LSU Tigers 2-0 in the Baton Rouge Super Regionals, and ultimately got to the 2016 CWS Final and defeated Arizona two games to one to win the National Championship. The title game finished mere hours before Coastal officially left the Big South Conference, the school's home since 1983 (1984 baseball season), for the Sun Belt Conference. The state's governor Nikki Haley proclaimed July 1, 2016, the day after the title game and also Coastal's first official day as a Sun Belt member, "Chanticleer Baseball National Championship Day" throughout South Carolina.

Historically, Coastal's primary baseball rivals have been Winthrop, Liberty, and Charleston.

== NCAA Regional appearances ==
NCAA Regional Results
1991 Tallahassee, FL Regional

Lost to Florida State, 7–0
Lost to Georgia Tech, 11–7

2001 Athens, GA Regional

Defeated Georgia Tech, 5–3
Defeated Georgia Southern, 15–3
Lost to Georgia, 9–3
Lost to Georgia, 8–7

2002 Atlanta, GA Regional

Lost to Georgia Tech, 6–0
Defeated Louisville, 9–1
Lost to Georgia, 9–7

2003 Lincoln, NE Regional

Lost to Missouri State, 8–3
Lost to Eastern Michigan, 9–8

2004 Columbia, SC Regional

Lost to North Carolina, 6–5
Lost to The Citadel, 10–1

2005 Tempe, AZ Regional

Defeated UNLV, 12–8
Lost to Arizona State, 11–3
Defeated UNLV, 14–10
Lost to Arizona State, 9–5

* Coastal Carolina receives first ever #1 seed

2007 Myrtle Beach, SC Regional at BB&T Coastal Field

Defeated Virginia Commonwealth, 7–1
Lost to Clemson, 11–8
Defeated St. John's, 6–5
Lost to Clemson, 15–3

CCU receives #1 seed and hosts regional for first time

2008 Conway, SC Regional

Defeated Columbia University, 10–2
Defeated Alabama, 13–10
Defeated East Carolina, 24–11

CCU receives #1 seed and hosts regional on-campus at Charles Watson Stadium for first time

2009 Chapel Hill, NC Regional

Defeated Kansas, 11–3
Lost to North Carolina, 14–5
Lost to Kansas, 5–1

2010 Myrtle Beach, SC Regional

Defeated Stony Brook, 6–0
Lost to College of Charleston, 16–6
Defeated Stony Brook, 25–7
Defeated College of Charleston, 8–7
Defeated College of Charleston, 11–10

CCU receives #1 seed and hosts regional at BB&T Coastal Field

2011 Clemson, SC Regional

Defeated Connecticut, 13–1
Lost to Clemson, 12–7
Lost to Connecticut, 12–6

2012 Columbia, SC Regional

Lost to Clemson, 10–3
Defeated Manhattan, 11–1
Lost to Clemson, 5–3

2013 Blacksburg, VA Regional

Lost to Oklahoma, 7–3
Lost to Virginia Tech, 9–1

2015 College Station, TX Regional

Lost to California, 9–3
Defeated Texas Southern, 4–1
Lost to Texas A&M, 8–1

2016 Raleigh, NC Regional

Defeated Saint Mary's, 5–2
Defeated NC State, 4–0
Lost to NC State, 8–1
Defeated NC State, 7–5

2018 Conway, SC Regional

Defeated LIU Brooklyn, 16–1
Lost to Washington, 11–6
Lost to UConn, 6–5

CCU receives #1 seed and hosts regional at Springs Brooks Stadium for first time

2019 Atlanta, GA Regional

Lost to Auburn, 16–7
Defeated Florida A&M, 9–4
Lost to Georgia Tech, 10–8

2022 Greenville, NC Regional

Lost to Virginia, 7–2
Defeated Coppin State, 10–8
Defeated Virginia, 7–6
Defeated East Carolina, 9–1
Lost to East Carolina, 13–4

2023 Conway, SC Regional

Lost to Rider, 11–10
Defeated UNCW, 12–2
Defeated Rider, 13-5
Defeated Duke, 8–6
Lost to Duke, 12–3

2024 Clemson, SC Regional

Defeated Vanderbilt, 13–3
Lost to Clemson, 4–3
Defeated High Point, 6–5
Lost to Clemson, 12–5

2025 Conway, SC Regional

Defeated Fairfield, 10–2
Defeated East Carolina, 18–7
Defeated East Carolina 1–0

2026 Tallahassee, FL Regional

Lost to Northern Illinois, 12–10
Lost to Florida State, 2–1

== NCAA Super Regional appearances ==
NCAA Super Regional Results
2008 Cary, NC Super Regional at USA Baseball National Training Complex

Lost to North Carolina, 9–4
Lost to North Carolina, 14–4

2010 Myrtle Beach, SC Super Regional at BB&T Coastal Field

Lost to South Carolina, 4–3
Lost to South Carolina, 10–9
CCU hosts Super Regional for first time

2016 Baton Rouge, LA Super Regional at Alex Box Stadium

Defeated LSU, 11–8
Defeated LSU, 4–3
Advances to College World Series

2025 Auburn, AL Super Regional at Plainsman Park

Defeated Auburn 7–6
Defeated Auburn 4–1
Advances to College World Series

== NCAA College World Series appearances ==
On June 19, 2016, the Chanticleers baseball program made their first ever appearance in the CWS defeating #1 ranked Florida Gators. The Chanticleers made it through the double elimination bracket with one loss. In the Best of 3 Series against Arizona, the Chanticleers lost game 1 but rallied back to win games 2 and 3. On June 30, 2016 the Coastal Carolina Chanticleers defeated Arizona 4–3 in game 3 to become the 2016 NCAA Men's Baseball Champions.

NCAA College World Series Results
2016 College World Series at TD Ameritrade Park, Omaha, NE

Defeated No. 1 Florida, 2–1
Lost to TCU, 6–1
Defeated No. 5 Texas Tech, 7–5
Defeated TCU, 4–1
Defeated TCU, 7–5
CWS National Championship Series (Best of 3)
Lost to Arizona, 3–0
Defeated Arizona, 5–4
Defeated Arizona, 4–3

2025 College World Series at Charles Schwab Field Omaha, Omaha, NE

Defeated Arizona, 7–4
Defeated Oregon State, 6–2
Defeated Louisville, 11–3
CWS National Championship Series (Best of 3)
Lost to LSU, 0–1
Lost to LSU, 3–5

== Alumni on MLB Rosters ==
In 2017, Coastal Carolina has had 3 former players on active MLB rosters.

- Taylor Motter, SS – St. Louis Cardinals
- Tommy LaStella, 2B – Los Angeles Angels
- Jacob May, CF – Chicago White Sox, currently a free agent

In all, the university has produced 11 players on active MLB rosters, beginning with Mickey Brantley in 1987.

== NCAA vs MLB Exhibition Game ==
On March 29, 2011, the Coastal Carolina baseball team scheduled an exhibition game against MLB's Texas Rangers at the Chanticleers home field for 2013, BB&T Coastal Field in Myrtle Beach, SC. The Rangers won the game 6–2.

== See also ==
- List of NCAA Division I baseball programs
