= 1991 NCAA Division I baseball tournament =

- Season: 1991
- Teams: 48
- Finals site: Johnny Rosenblatt Stadium; Omaha, NE
- Champions: LSU (1st title)
- Runner-up: Wichita State (4th CWS Appearance)
- Winning coach: Skip Bertman (1st title)
- MOP: Gary Hymel (LSU)

The 1991 NCAA Division I baseball tournament was played at the end of the 1991 NCAA Division I baseball season to determine the national champion of college baseball. The tournament concluded with eight teams competing in the College World Series, a double-elimination tournament in its forty fifth year. Eight regional competitions were held to determine the participants in the final event. Each region was composed of six teams, resulting in 48 teams participating in the tournament at the conclusion of their regular season, and in some cases, after a conference tournament. The forty-fifth tournament's champion was LSU, coached by Skip Bertman. The Most Outstanding Player was Gary Hymel of LSU.

== Regionals ==
The opening rounds of the tournament were played across eight regional sites across the country, each consisting of a six-team field. Each regional tournament is double-elimination, however region brackets are variable depending on the number of teams remaining after each round. The winners of each regional advanced to the College World Series.

Bold indicates winner.

=== Atlantic Regional ===
at Tallahassee, FL

First round
1	**Florida State**	**6**
6	Coastal Carolina	0
2	Georgia Tech	5
5	**St. John's**	**6**
3	**Alabama**	**5**
4	FIU	1

Second round
1	**Florida State**	**6**
4	FIU	3
5	St. John's	2
3	**Alabama**	**5**
6	Coastal Carolina	7
2	**Georgia Tech**	**11**

Third round
1	**Florida State**	**5**
3	Alabama	2
5	St. John's	4
2	**Georgia Tech**	**5**

Semifinals
3	**Alabama**	**8**
2	Georgia Tech	4

Final
1	**Florida State**	**6**	–
3	Alabama	5	–

=== Central Regional ===
at Austin, TX

First round
1	**Texas**	**3**
6	UAB	1
2	**Oklahoma State**	**9**
5	Rutgers	4
3	**Long Beach State**	**6**^{11}
4	Southern Miss	5

Second round
1	**Texas**	**18**
4	Southern Miss	2
2	Oklahoma State	5
3	**Long Beach State**	**7**
6	**UAB**	10
5	Rutgers	9

Third round
1	Texas	10
3	**Long Beach State**	**17**
2	**Oklahoma State**	**8**^{10}
6	UAB	7

Semifinals
1	Texas	1
2	**Oklahoma State**	**6**

Final
3	**Long Beach State**	8	**8**
2	Oklahoma State	**12**	4

=== East Regional ===
at Gainesville, FL

First round
1	**Florida**	**2**
6	Furman	0
2	**NC State**	**11**
5	Ohio	5
3	Jacksonville	2
4	**Missouri**	**5**

Second round
1	**Florida**	**3**
3	Jacksonville	0
2	**NC State**	**3**
4	Missouri	1
6	**Furman**	**7**
5	Ohio	2

Third round
1	**Florida**	**9**
2	NC State	4
4	**Missouri**	**8**
6	Furman	4

Semifinals
2	**NC State**	**8**
4	Missouri	5

Final
1	**Florida**	**3**^{10}	–
2	NC State	2	–

=== Midwest Regional ===
at Wichita, KS

First round
1	**Wichita State**	**10**
6	East Carolina	5
2	**Ohio State**	**7**
5	Rider	4
3	Baylor	3
4	**California**	**4**

Second round
1	**Wichita State**	**13**
3	Baylor	7
2	Ohio State	8
4	**California**	**10**
6	**East Carolina**	**6**
5	Rider	5

Third round
1	**Wichita State**	**8**
4	California	1
2	**Ohio State**	**6**
6	East Carolina	5

Semifinals
4	**California**	**6**
2	Ohio State	5

Final
1	**Wichita State**	**11**	–
4	California	5	–

=== Northeast Regional ===
at Orono, ME

First round
1	**Clemson**	**13**
6	Princeton	5
2	**Mississippi State**	**10**
5	Towson	4
3	**Maine**	**10**
4	Villanova	3

Second round
1	**Clemson**	**8**
4	Villanova	3
2	**Mississippi State**	**6**
3	Maine	5
6	Princeton	0
5	**Towson**	**5**

Third round
1	**Clemson**	**10**
2	Mississippi State	9
3	**Maine**	**8**
5	Towson	0

Semifinals
2	Mississippi State	5
3	**Maine**	**8**

Final
1	**Clemson**	**13**	—
3	Maine	5	—

=== South Regional ===
at Baton Rouge, LA

First round
1	**LSU**	**13**
6	Northwestern State	2
2	**Texas A&M**	**16**
5	Louisiana	4
3	Oklahoma	4
4	**South Alabama**	**5**^{10}

Second round
1	**LSU**	**4**
3	Oklahoma	3
2	**Texas A&M**	**12**
4	South Alabama	0
6	Northwestern State	7
5	**Louisiana**	**11**

Third round
1	**LSU**	**7**
2	Texas A&M	1
4	South Alabama	3
5	**Louisiana**	**6**

Semifinals
2	Texas A&M	10
5	**Louisiana**	**13**

Final
1	**LSU**	**8**	–
5	Louisiana	5	–

=== West I Regional ===
at Los Angeles, CA

First round
1	**USC**	**7**
6	Middle Tennessee	5
2	Hawaii	3
5	**Minnesota**	**5**
3	Pepperdine	3
4	**Creighton**	**5**

Second round
1	**USC**	**17**
3	Pepperdine	7
5	Minnesota	3
4	**Creighton**	**8**
6	Middle Tennessee	3
2	**Hawaii**	**7**

Third round
1	USC	7
4	**Creighton**	**8**^{10}
5	Minnesota	9
2	**Hawaii**	**12**

Semifinals
1	USC	3
2	**Hawaii**	**7**

Final
4	**Creighton**	**15**	—
2	Hawaii	8	—

=== West II Regional ===
at Fresno, CA

First round
1	**Miami (FL)**	**13**
6	Portland	1
2	**Stanford**	**12**
5	San Diego State	5
3	**Fresno State**	**7**
4	Cal State Northridge	2

Second round
1	Miami (FL)	6
4	**Cal State Northridge**	**13**
6	**Portland**	**12**
5	San Diego State	5
2	Stanford	2
3	**Fresno State**	6
1	Miami (FL)	7
2	**Stanford**	**15**

Third round
4	**Cal State Northridge**	**12**
6	Portland	7
3	**Fresno State**	**4**
2	Stanford	2

Final
4	Cal State Northridge	**6**	5
3	**Fresno State**	2	**6**

== College World Series ==
=== Participants ===
Seeding	School	Conference	Record (conference)	Head coach	CWS appearances	CWS best finish	CWS record
1	Florida State	Metro	57–12 (15–5)	Mike Martin	10 (last: 1989)	2nd (1970, 1986)	15–20
2	Clemson	ACC	60–8 (18–3)	Bill Wilhelm	5 (last: 1980)	5th (1958, 1959, 1976)	4–10
3	Wichita State	MVC	63–12 (21–3)	Gene Stephenson	3 (last: 1989)	1st (1989)	10–5
4	LSU	SEC	51–18 (19–7)	Skip Bertman	4 (last: 1990)	4th (1987, 1989, 1990)	7–8
5	Florida	SEC	49–19 (16–8)	Joe Arnold	1 (last: 1988)	5th (1988)	1–2
6	Long Beach State	Big West	44–20 (14–7)	Dave Snow	1 (last: 1989)	8th (1989)	0–2
7	Creighton	MVC	49–20 (16–8)	Jim Hendry	1st appearance	N/A	0–0
8	Fresno State	Big West	41–21 (15–6)	Bob Bennett	2 (last: 1988)	3rd (1959)	3–4

=== Results ===
==== Bracket ====
First round	Second round
1	Florida State	3
8	Fresno State	6
8	Fresno State	3
4	LSU	15
4	LSU	8
5	Florida	1
Bracket One
1	Florida State	0
5	Florida	5
8	Fresno State	1
5	Florida	2
2	Clemson	4
7	Creighton	8
7	Creighton	2
3	Wichita State	3^{12}
3	Wichita State	8
6	Long Beach State	5
Bracket Two
6	Long Beach State	12
2	Clemson	11
7	Creighton	13
6	Long Beach State	4

Semifinals
4	LSU	19	—
5	Florida	8	—
3	Wichita State	11	—
7	Creighton	3	—

Finals
4	LSU	6
3	Wichita State	3

==== Game results ====
Date	Game	Winner	Score	Loser	Notes
May 31	Game 1	Fresno State	6–3	Florida State	
May 31	Game 2	LSU	8–1	Florida	
June 1	Game 3	Creighton	8–4	Clemson	
June 1	Game 4	Wichita State	8–5	Long Beach State	
June 2	Game 5	Florida	5–0	Florida State	Florida State eliminated
June 2	Game 6	LSU	15–3	Fresno State	
June 3	Game 7	Long Beach State	12–11	Clemson	Clemson eliminated
June 3	Game 8	Wichita State	3–2 (12 innings)	Creighton	
June 4	Game 9	Florida	2–1	Fresno State	Fresno State eliminated
June 4	Game 10	Creighton	13–4	Long Beach State	Long Beach State eliminated
June 5	Game 11	LSU	19–8	Florida	Florida eliminated
June 5	Game 12	Wichita State	11–3	Creighton	Creighton eliminated
June 8	Final	LSU	6–3	Wichita State	LSU wins CWS

== All-Tournament Team ==
The following players were members of the College World Series All-Tournament Team.

Position	Player	School
P	Chad Ogea	LSU
P	Kennie Steenstra	Wichita State
C	Gary Hymel (MOP)	LSU
1B	John Tellechea	LSU
2B	Mike McCafferty	Creighton
3B	Jason Giambi	Long Beach State
SS	Kevin Polcovich	Florida
OF	Jim Audley	Wichita State
OF	Steve Hinton	Creighton
OF	Lyle Mouton	LSU
DH	Mario Linares	Florida

=== Notable players ===
- Clemson: Mike Holtz, Billy McMillon, Keith Williams
- Creighton: Kimera Bartee, Alan Benes, Mike Heathcott, Dax Jones, Scott Stahoviak
- Florida: John Burke, Herb Perry, Kevin Polcovich, Marc Valdes, Rob Bonanno
- Florida State: Roger Bailey, Chris Brock, Tim Davis, Eduardo Pérez, Kenny Robinson, John Wasdin
- Fresno State: Brant Brown, Bobby Jones, Steve Soderstrom, Jason Wood
- Long Beach State: Brent Cookson, Jason Giambi, Steve Trachsel
- LSU: Paul Byrd, Rick Greene, Lyle Mouton, Chad Ogea, Armando Ríos, Andy Sheets, Mike Sirotka
- Wichita State: Jaime Bluma, Darren Dreifort, Tyler Green, Doug Mirabelli, Kennie Steenstra, Scot McCloughan

== See also ==
- 1991 NCAA Division II baseball tournament
- 1991 NCAA Division III baseball tournament
- 1991 NAIA World Series
