= 2016 Coastal Carolina Chanticleers baseball team =

American college baseball season

2016 Coastal Carolina Chanticleers baseball

National champions Big South Champions Big South tournament Champions

Baton Rouge Super Regional champions Raleigh Regional champions
- Conference: Big South Conference

Ranking
- Coaches: No. 1
- CB: No. 1
- Record: 55–18 (21–3 Big South)
- Head coach: Gary Gilmore (21st season)
- Assistant coaches: Kevin Schnall (13th season); Drew Thomas (10th season); Matt Schilling (9th season)
- Home stadium: Springs Brooks Stadium

2016 Big South Conference baseball standings
	Conf.				Overall
Team	W		L	PCT	W		L	PCT
#1 Coastal Carolina †‡^{y} ‍‍‍	21	–	3	.875	53	–	17	.757
High Point ‍‍‍	14	–	10	.583	32	–	24	.571
Longwood ‍‍‍	14	–	10	.583	32	–	27	.542
Gardner–Webb ‍‍‍	14	–	10	.583	37	–	21	.638
Campbell* ‍‍‍	13	–	11	.542	26	–	27	.491
Presbyterian ‍‍‍	12	–	12	.500	27	–	30	.474
Liberty ‍‍‍	12	–	12	.500	31	–	28	.525
Winthrop ‍‍‍	12	–	12	.500	28	–	27	.509
Radford ‍‍‍	9	–	15	.375	19	–	39	.328
Charleston Southern ‍‍‍	6	–	18	.250	19	–	34	.358
UNC Asheville ‍‍‍	5	–	19	.208	16	–	38	.296
† – Conference champion ‡ – Tournament champion y – Invited to the NCAA tournament *Ineligible for postseason play due to APR penalties As of June 5, 2016; Rankings from Collegiate Baseball

The 2016 Coastal Carolina Chanticleers baseball team represented Coastal Carolina University in the 2016 NCAA Division I baseball season. The Chanticleers played their home games at Springs Brooks Stadium, on campus in Conway, South Carolina. Gary Gilmore was in his 21st season as the Chanticleers' coach. They won the 2016 College World Series, and with it the 2016 NCAA Division I National Championship, at TD Ameritrade Park in Omaha, Nebraska over Arizona.

== Personnel ==
=== Roster ===
2016 Coastal Carolina Chanticleers roster
Pitchers: 2 - Zack Hopeck - Sophomore; 10 - Jason Bilous - Freshman; 18 - Alex Cunningham - Junior; 25 - Mike Morrison - Senior; 27 - Adam Hall - Senior; 31 - Bobby Holmes - Sophomore; 33 - Tyler Poole - Senior; 34 - Cole Schaefer - Junior; 39 - Austin Kitchen - Freshman; 40 - Brandon Miller - Freshman; 41 - Andrew Beckwith - Junior	Catchers: 12 - David Parrett - Senior; 13 - Peyton Isaacson - Freshman; 16 - Matt Beaird - Sophomore; 37 - G.K. Young - Junior; 42 - Kyle Skeels - Freshman; Infielders: 1 - Michael Paez - Junior; 5 - Kieton Rivers - Freshman; 7 - Zach Remillard - Senior; 8 - Tyler Chadwick - Senior; 11 - Jordan Gore - Junior; 19 - Kevin Woodall Jr. - Sophomore; 26 - Seth Lancaster - Sophomore; 38 - Cameron Pearcey - Freshman	Outfielders: 3 - Josh Crump - Sophomore; 6 - Connor Owings - Senior; 17 - Billy Cooke - Sophomore; 24 - Dalton Ewing - Sophomore; 29 - Anthony Marks - Senior

=== Coaches ===
2016 Coastal Carolina Chanticleers baseball coaching staff
- 14 - Gary Gilmore – Head coach
- 9 - Kevin Schnall – Associate head coach
- 22 - Drew Thomas – Assistant coach
- 4 - Matt Schilling – Volunteer assistant coach

== Schedule ==
Legend
	Coastal win
	Coastal loss
	Cancellation
**Bold**	Coastal team member
*	Non-Conference game

2016 Coastal Carolina Chanticleers baseball game log
Regular season

February
Date	Opponent	Rank	Site/stadium	Score	Win	Loss	Save	Attendance	Overall record	BSC Record
Feb 19	Appalachian State*	#33	Springs Brooks Stadium • Conway, SC (Caravelle Resort Tournament)	**W** 17–2	**Poole (1–0)**	Hampton (0–1)	None	2,003	1–0	
Feb 20	NC State*	#33	Springs Brooks Stadium • Conway, SC (Caravelle Resort Tournament)	**L** 10–13	Gilbert (1–0)	**Holmes (0–1)**	None	2,179	1–1	
Feb 21	#9 Virginia*	#33	Springs Brooks Stadium • Conway, SC (Caravelle Resort Tournament)	**W** 5–4	**Beckwith (1–0)**	Bettinger (0–1)	None	3,136	2–1	
Feb 23	at UNC Wilmington*		Brooks Field • Wilmington, NC	**Cancelled**						
Feb 26	Marshall*		Springs Brooks Stadium • Conway, SC (Caravelle Resort's Baseball at the Beach)	**W** 9–3	**Morrison (1–0)**	Hammer (0–2)	None	1,221	3–1	
Feb 27	Ohio State*		Springs Brooks Stadium • Conway, SC (Caravelle Resort's Baseball at the Beach)	**L** 4–6	Tully (2–0)	**Cunningham (0–1)**	Pavlopoulos (1)	2,136	3–2	
Feb 28	Duke*		Springs Brooks Stadium • Conway, SC (Caravelle Resort's Baseball at the Beach)	**W** 10–6	**Poole (2–0)**	McAfee (0–1)	**Holmes (1)**	2,062	4–2	
Feb 29	Ohio State*		Springs Brooks Stadium • Conway, SC (Caravelle Resort's Baseball at the Beach)	**W** 3–2^{10}	**Morrison (2–0)**	Kinker (0–1)	None	1,831	5–2	

March
Date	Opponent	Rank	Site/stadium	Score	Win	Loss	Save	Attendance	Overall record	BSC Record
Mar 2	at College of Charleston*		CofC Baseball Stadium at Patriot's Point • Mount Pleasant, SC	**L** 4–9	Carpin (2–0)	**Corbett (0–1)**	None	722	5–3	
Mar 4	Cincinnati*		Springs Brooks Stadium • Conway, SC (Chanticleer Classic)	**L** 7–10	Zellner (1–1)	**Bilous (0–1)**	Lowe II (1)	1,417	5–4	
Mar 5	#17 Ole Miss*		Springs Brooks Stadium • Conway, SC (Chanticleer Classic)	**L** 2–8	Smith (1–1)	**Poole (2–1)**	None	1,789	5–5	
Mar 6	Ball State*		Springs Brooks Stadium • Conway, SC (Chanticleer Classic)	**W** 12–5	**Morrison (3–0)**	Gibson (0–1)	None	1,416	6–5	
Mar 8	Wake Forest*		Springs Brooks Stadium • Conway, SC	**L** 0–11	Bartholemew (3–0)	**Davidson (0–1)**	None	1,326	6–6	
Mar 9	Wake Forest*		Springs Brooks Stadium • Conway, SC	**W** 7–6	**Cunningham (1–1)**	Johnson (0–1)	None	1,301	7–6	
Mar 11	UNC Greensboro*		Springs Brooks Stadium • Conway, SC (Coastal Carolina Invitational)	**L** 2–4	Smith (2–0)	**Beckwith (1–1)**	Sykes (2)	1,176	7–7	
Mar 12	Illinois*		Springs Brooks Stadium • Conway, SC (Coastal Carolina Invitational)	**W** 10–4	**Holmes (1–1)**	Hayes (2–2)	None	1,516	8–7	
Mar 13	Illinois*		Springs Brooks Stadium • Conway, SC (Coastal Carolina Invitational)	**W** 12–4	**Poole (3–1)**	Mamlic (2–2)	**Morrison (1)**	1,196	9–7	
Mar 13	UNC Greensboro*		Springs Brooks Stadium • Conway, SC (Coastal Carolina Invitational)	**W** 7–4	**Cunningham (2–1)**	Frisbee (0–2)	None	1,285	10–7	
Mar 16	at UNC Wilmington*		Brooks Field • Wilmington, NC	**W** 6–4	**Kitchen (1–0)**	Magestro (2–2)	**Beckwith (1)**	1,157	11–7	
Mar 18	at Longwood		Bolding Stadium • Farmville, VA	**L** 2–5	Burnette (3–1)	**Poole (3–2)**	Jones (1)	143	11–8	0–1
Mar 18	at Longwood		Bolding Stadium • Farmville, VA	**W** 7–2	**Schaefer (1–0)**	Farkas (0–1)	**Morrison (2)**	127	12–8	1–1
Mar 19	at Longwood		Bolding Stadium • Farmville, VA	**W** 11–2	**Cunningham (3–1)**	SImpson (0–1)	**Kitchen (1)**	119	13–8	2–1
Mar 22	at College of Charleston*		CofC Baseball Stadium at Patriot's Point • Mount Pleasant, SC	**L** 2–4	Bauer (2–0)	**Hopeck (0–1)**	Love (6)	455	13–9	
Mar 24	Stetson*		Springs Brooks Stadium • Conway, SC	**W** 11–2	**Holmes (2–1)**	Jordan (2–3)	None	1,532	14–9	
Mar 25	Stetson*		Springs Brooks Stadium • Conway, SC	**W** 17–5	**Cunningham (4–1)**	Wilson (2–4)	None	1,267	15–9	
Mar 26	Stetson*		Springs Brooks Stadium • Conway, SC	**W** 12–2	**Poole (4–2)**	Perkins (0–1)	None	1,342	16–9	
Mar 30	The Citadel*		Springs Brooks Stadium • Conway, SC	**W** 4–3	**Hopeck (1–1)**	Bialakis (1–1)	**Morrison (3)**	2,793	17–9	

April
Date	Opponent	Rank	Site/stadium	Score	Win	Loss	Save	Attendance	Overall record	BSC Record
Apr 1	Gardner-Webb		Springs Brooks Stadium • Conway, SC	**W** 16–4	**Beckwith (2–1)**	Haymes (5–1)	None	1,282	18–9	3–1
Apr 2	Gardner-Webb		Springs Brooks Stadium • Conway, SC	**W** 10–4	**Holmes (3–1)**	Walker (4–3)	None	1,431	19–9	4–1
Apr 3	Gardner-Webb		Springs Brooks Stadium • Conway, SC	**W** 10–6	**Beckwith (3–1)**	Hallman (3–2)	**Morrison (4)**	1,693	20–9	5–1
Apr 5	at #6 South Carolina*	#23	Founders Park • Columbia, SC	**L** 2–4	Widener (1–1)	**Hopeck (1–2)**	Reagan (8)	7,275	20–10	
Apr 8	at Radford	#23	Radford Baseball Stadium • Radford, VA	**W** 13–6	**Cunningham (5–1)**	Ridgely (2–3)	None	217	21–10	6–1
Apr 10	at Radford	#23	Radford Baseball Stadium • Radford, VA	**W** 7–4	**Beckwith (4–1)**	Nelson (0–7)	None		22–10	7–1
Apr 10	at Radford	#23	Radford Baseball Stadium • Radford, VA	**W** 7–2	**Kitchen (2–0)**	MacKeith (3–2)	None	27	23–10	8–1
Apr 13	College of Charleston*	#22	Springs Brooks Stadium • Conway, SC	**W** 5–3	**Mirrison (4–0)**	Carpin (3–2)	None	1,291	24–10	
Apr 15	Presbyterian	#22	Springs Brooks Stadium • Conway, SC	**W** 5–2	**Cunningham (6–1)**	Kehner (4–3)	None	1,251	25–10	9–1
Apr 16	Presbyterian	#22	Springs Brooks Stadium • Conway, SC	**W** 4–2	**Morrison (5–0)**	Springs (1–2)	None	1,407	26–10	10–1
Apr 17	Presbyterian	#22	Springs Brooks Stadium • Conway, SC	**W** 12–3	**Beckwith (5–1)**	Norwood (0–1)	None	1,400	27–10	11–1
Apr 19	at North Carolina*	#18	Boshamer Stadium • Chapel Hill, NC	**W** 6–3	**Kitchen (3–0)**	Williams (3–1)	**Morrison (5)**	1,789	28–10	
Apr 20	College of Charleston*	#18	Springs Brooks Stadium • Conway, SC	**W** 9–5	**Beckwith (6–1)**	Carpin (3–3)	None	1,406	29–10	
Apr 23	High Point	#18	Springs Brooks Stadium • Conway, SC	**L** 2–5	Hoffman (4–3)	**Cunningham (6–2)**	Britton (3)	1,476	29–11	11–2
Apr 24	High Point	#18	Springs Brooks Stadium • Conway, SC	**W** 17–5	**Holmes (4–1)**	Scrubb (6–4)	None	1,372	30–11	12–2
Apr 25	High Point	#13	Springs Brooks Stadium • Conway, SC	**W** 4–0	**Beckwith (7–1)**	Gottfired (4–3)	None	1,221	31–11	13–2
Apr 29	at Georgia Tech*	#13	Russ Chandler Stadium • Atlanta, GA	**L** 1–9	Gold (5–2)	**Cunningham (6–3)**	None	1,169	31–12	
Apr 30	at Georgia Tech*	#13	Russ Chandler Stadium • Atlanta, GA	**L** 8–9	Ryan (2–2)	**Morrison (5–1)**	None	1,293	31–13	

May
Date	Opponent	Rank	Site/stadium	Score	Win	Loss	Save	Attendance	Overall record	BSC Record
May 1	at Georgia Tech*	#13	Russ Chandler Stadium • Atlanta, GA	**L** 2–4^{7}	Lee (3–0)	**Poole (4–3)**	Dulaney (3)	1,001	31–14	
May 6	at Liberty	#25	Liberty Baseball Stadium • Lynchburg, VA	**W** 14–6	**Cunningham (7–3)**	Herndon (3–3)	None	1,549	32–14	14–2
May 7	at Liberty	#25	Liberty Baseball Stadium • Lynchburg, VA	**W** 12–3	**Beckwith (8–1)**	Bean (1–1)	**Hopeck (1)**	1,484	33–14	15–2
May 8	at Liberty	#25	Liberty Baseball Stadium • Lynchburg, VA	**W** 17–3	**Kitchen (4–0)**	Degroat (2–3)	None	1,208	34–14	16–2
May 13	at Charleston Southern	#24	Buccaneer Ballpark • North Charleston, SC	**L** 4–6	Maw (1–2)	**Holmes (4–2)**	None	254	34–15	16–3
May 14	at Charleston Southern	#24	Buccaneer Ballpark • North Charleston, SC	**W** 9–3	**Beckwith (9–1)**	Johnson (4–5)	None	265	35–15	17–3
May 15	at Charleston Southern	#24	Buccaneer Ballpark • North Charleston, SC	**W** 6–0	**Bilous (1–0)**	Nations (1–6)	**Kitchen (2)**	331	36–15	18–3
May 17	UNC Wilmington*	#25	Springs Brooks Stadium • Conway, SC	**W** 4–1	**Hopeck (2–2)**	Barnes (2–1)	**Morrison (6)**	1,146	37–15	
May 19	Campbell	#25	Springs Brooks Stadium • Conway, SC	**W** 9–1	**Cunningham (8–3)**	Thayer (8–6)	**Beckwith (2)**	1,114	38–15	19–3
May 20	Campbell	#25	Springs Brooks Stadium • Conway, SC	**W** 6–5	**Morrison (6–1)**	Dowse (2–2)	None	1,158	39–15	20–3
May 21	Campbell	#25	Springs Brooks Stadium • Conway, SC	**W** 23–4^{7}	**Bilous (2–1)**	Horrell (5–6)	None	1,782	40–15	21–3

Postseason

Big South Tournament
Date	Opponent	Rank	Site/stadium	Score	Win	Loss	Save	Attendance	Overall record	BSCT Record
May 24	(8) Radford	(1) #19	Lexington County Baseball Stadium • Lexington, SC	**W** 7–5	**Morrison (7–1)**	Zurak (0–2)	None	767	41–15	1–0
May 25	(4) Gardner-Webb	(1) #19	Lexington County Baseball Stadium • Lexington, SC	**W** 4–3	**Beckwith (10–1)**	Walker (9–5)	**Morrison (7)**	767	42–15	2–0
May 27	(3) Longwood	(1) #19	Lexington County Baseball Stadium • Lexington, SC	**W** 5–1	**Hopeck (3–2)**	Burnette (8–2)	**Holmes (2)**	812	43–15	3–0
May 28	(7) Liberty	(1) #19	Lexington County Baseball Stadium • Lexington, SC	**W** 1–0	**Bilous (3–1)**	Degroat (4–4)	**Morrisonn (8)**	1,512	44–15	4–0

NCAA Raleigh Regional
Date	Opponent	Rank	Site/stadium	Score	Win	Loss	Save	Attendance	Overall record	NCAAT record
June 3	(3) Saint Mary's	(2) #15	Doak Field • Raleigh, NC	**W** 5–2	**Beckwith (11–1)**	Burnes (9–2)	**Holmes (3)**	2,240	45–15	1–0
June 5	(1) #17 NC State	(2) #15	Doak Field • Raleigh, NC	**W** 4–0	**Cunningham (9–3)**	Wilder (3–4)	**Morrison (9)**	3,048	46–15	2–0
June 6	(1) #17 NC State	(2) #15	Doak Field • Raleigh, NC	**L** 1–8	Gilbert (5–1)	**Hopeck (3–3)**	None	2,627	46–16	2–1
June 7	(1) #17 NC State	(2) #15	Doak Field • Raleigh, NC	**W** 7–5	**Beckwith (12–1)**	Brabrand (1–1)	**Morrison (10)**	2,918	47–16	3–1

NCAA Baton Rouge Super Regional
Date	Opponent	Rank	Site/stadium	Score	Win	Loss	Save	Attendance	Overall record	NCAAT record
June 11	#8 LSU	#11	Alex Box Stadium/Skip Bertman Field • Baton Rouge, LA	**W** 11–8	**Holmes (5–2)**	Lange (8–4)	**Morrison (11)**	11,516	48–16	4–1
June 12	#8 LSU	#11	Alex Box Stadium/Skip Bertman Field • Baton Rouge, LA	**W** 4–3	**Holmes (6–2)**	Newman (1–1)	None	11,606	49–16	5–1

College World Series
Date	Team	Rank	Site/stadium	Score	Win	Loss	Save	Attendance	Overall record	CWS record
June 19	(1) #1 Florida*	#5	TD Ameritrade Park • Omaha, NE	**W** 2–1	**Beckwith (13–1)**	Shore (11–6)	None	19,696	50–16	1–0
June 21	#3 TCU	#5	TD Ameritrade Park • Omaha, NE	**L** 1–6	Howard (10–2)	**Cunningham (9–4)**	Burnett (1)	22,704	50–17	1–1
June 23	(5) #4 Texas Tech	#5	TD Ameritrade Park • Omaha, NE	**W** 7–5	**Morrison (8–1)**	Lanning (3–3)	**Holmes (4)**	25,367	51–17	2–1
June 24	#3 TCU	#5	TD Ameritrade Park • Omaha, NE	**W** 4–1	**Beckwith (14–1)**	Traver (1–3)	None	24,904	52–17	3–1
June 25	#3 TCU	#5	TD Ameritrade Park • Omaha, NE	**W** 7–5	**Cunningham (10–4)**	Janczak (7–4)	None	14,561	53–17	4–1
June 27	#7 Arizona	#5	TD Ameritrade Park • Omaha, NE	**L** 0–3	Cloney (8–4)	**Hopeck (3–4)**	None	20,789	53–18	4–2
June 28	#7 Arizona	#5	TD Ameritrade Park • Omaha, NE	**W** 5–4	**Holmes (7–2)**	Ming (3–3)	None	24,716	54–18	5–2
June 30	#7 Arizona	#5	TD Ameritrade Park • Omaha, NE	**W** 4–3	**Beckwith (15–1)**	Dalbec (11–6)	**Cunningham (1)**	18,823	55–18	6–2

== NCAA Tournament ==
=== Raleigh Regional ===
Raleigh Regional Teams
(1) NC State	(2) Coastal Carolina Chanticleers	(3) Saint Mary's Gaels	(4) Navy Midshipmen

First Round
1	No. 9 NC State	13
4	Navy	8
3	Saint Mary's (CA)	2
2	Coastal Carolina	5
Lower round 1
4	Navy	8
3	Saint Mary's (CA)	5^{13}

Semi-Finals
1	NC State	0
2	Coastal Carolina	4
Lower final
4	Navy	1
1	NC State	17

Finals
2	Coastal Carolina	1	7
1	NC State	8	5

=== Baton Rouge Super Regional ===
Baton Rouge Super Regional Teams
Coastal Carolina	vs.	(8) LSU Tigers

- ◆ Ranking based on NCAA tournament seeding

Championship Series
Coastal Carolina	11	4	-
No. 8 LSU Tigers	8	3	-

=== College World Series ===
Seeds listed below indicate national seeds only

First round
1	Florida	1
Coastal Carolina	2
TCU	5
5	Texas Tech	3
1	Florida	2
5	Texas Tech	3
3	Miami (FL)	1
Arizona	5
UC Santa Barbara	0
Oklahoma State	1
3	Miami (FL)	3
UC Santa Barbara	5

Second round
Coastal Carolina	1
TCU	6
5	Texas Tech	5
Coastal Carolina	7
Arizona	0
Oklahoma State	1
UC Santa Barbara	0
Arizona	3

Semifinals
TCU	1	5
Coastal Carolina	4	7
Oklahoma State	3	1
Arizona	9	5

Championship series
Coastal Carolina	0	5	4
Arizona	3	4	3

== Rankings ==
Ranking movements Legend: ██ Increase in ranking ██ Decrease in ranking — = Not ranked
	Week																		
Poll	Pre	1	2	3	4	5	6	7	8	9	10	11	12	13	14	15	16	17	Final
Coaches'	—	—*	—*	—	—	—	—	—	—	—	15	24	23	21	19	16	16*	16*	1
Baseball America	23	19	19	—	—	—	—	—	—	25	19	—	—	22	19	15	15*	15*	1
Collegiate Baseball^	33	—	—	—	—	—	—	23	22	18	13	25	24	25	19	15	11	5	1
NCBWA†	23	22	23	—	—	—	—	—	—	28	22	27	26	23	20	17	11	11*	1

^ Collegiate Baseball ranked 40 teams in their preseason poll, but only ranked 30 teams weekly during the season.
† NCBWA ranks 30 teams in their preseason poll, but only ranks 25 teams weekly during the season.
* A new poll was not released for this week, so for comparison purposes, the previous week's ranking is inserted in this week's slot.
