= Tom Riginos =

American baseball coach and former player

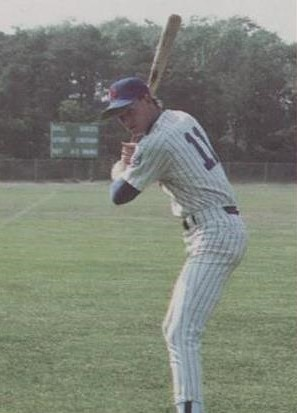
- Riginos with the Chatham A's in 1988

Biographical details
- Born: April 5, 1968 (age 58); Tampa, Florida, U.S.

Playing career
- 1987–1990: Stetson

Coaching career (HC unless noted)
- 1992–1993: Eastern Kentucky (assistant)
- 1994–2002: Stetson (assistant)
- 2003–2010: Clemson (assistant)
- 2011–2024: Winthrop

Head coaching record
- Overall: 348–377–1
- Tournaments: Big South: 13–15

Accomplishments and honors

Championships
- Big South (2017)

Thomas Anthony Riginos (born April 5, 1968) is an American baseball coach and former player, who is the former head baseball coach of the Winthrop Eagles. He played college baseball at Stetson University for coach Pete Dunn from 1987 to 1990.

== Playing career ==
Riginos played at Stetson, earning four letters and serving as team captain in his senior season of 1990. He stole 61 bases in his college career and helped lead the team to three conference titles and three NCAA Regionals. In 1988, he played collegiate summer baseball with the Chatham A's of the Cape Cod Baseball League, where he was a teammate of Baseball Hall of Famer Jeff Bagwell.

== Early coaching career ==
Riginos spent the 1991 season as an assistant at Countryside High School before earning an assistant coaching position at Eastern Kentucky. While working with the Colonel's hitters and outfielders, he earned a master's degree in Physical Education/Sports Administration. He then worked at Stetson as an assistant and recruiting coordinator. In his time with the Hatters under Pete Dunn, he recruited six future All-Americans and ten Freshman All-Americans.

== Clemson and Winthrop ==
In 2003, Riginos was hired as an assistant to Jack Leggett at Clemson. He again served as hitting coach and later added recruiting coordinator duties. Each of his recruiting classes with the Tigers was ranked highly by Collegiate Baseball, and Clemson's batting average routinely topped .300. The Tigers also ranked highly in home runs and several other offensive categories in Riginos' tenure, and advanced to a pair of College World Series, five Super Regionals, and seven NCAA Regionals in his eight seasons. He was hired as head coach at Winthrop after the 2010 CWS run, and has seen three players sign professional contracts, including a pair of draft picks.

On May 20, 2024, Winthrop announced that Riginos' contract will not be renewed after 14 seasons.

== Head coaching record ==
Record table
| Season | Team | Overall | Conference | Standing | Postseason |
|---|---|---|---|---|---|
Winthrop Eagles (Big South Conference) (2011–2024)
| 2011 | Winthrop | 27–30 | 15–12 | 4th (10) | Big South Tournament |
| 2012 | Winthrop | 17–35 | 9–14 | 10th (11) | |
| 2013 | Winthrop | 21–33 | 8–15 | 5th (South) (6) | |
| 2014 | Winthrop | 27–33 | 14–13 | 1st (South) (6) | Big South Tournament |
| 2015 | Winthrop | 40–19 | 16–8 | t-3rd | Big South Tournament |
| 2016 | Winthrop | 28–27 | 12–12 | t-4th | Big South Tournament |
| 2017 | Winthrop | 34–24 | 17–7 | 1st | Big South Tournament |
| 2018 | Winthrop | 25–31 | 15–12 | 4th | Big South Tournament |
| 2019 | Winthrop | 34–23 | 18–9 | 3rd | Big South Tournament |
| 2020 | Winthrop | 11–4 | 0–0 | | Season canceled due to COVID-19 |
| 2021 | Winthrop | 19–27 | 16–21 | 7th | |
| 2022 | Winthrop | 18–34 | 11–13 | T-6th | |
| 2023 | Winthrop | 28–28 | 15–12 | T-3rd | Big South Tournament |
| 2024 | Winthrop | 19–29–1 | 8–15 | 8th | |
| Winthrop: | | 348–377–1 | 166–148 | | |
| Total: | | 348–377–1 | | | |
National champion Postseason invitational champion Conference regular season champion Conference regular season and conference tournament champion Division regular season champion Division regular season and conference tournament champion Conference tournament champion
