= Ryan Mau =

American baseball coach (born 1978)

Biographical details
- Born: November 27, 1978 (age 47); Chicago, Illinois

Playing career
- 1997: Flagler
- 1998–2001: College of Charleston
- Position: Pitcher

Coaching career (HC unless noted)
- 2003: Charleston Southern (assistant)
- 2004–2005: Marist (assistant)
- 2006–2010: VMI (assistant)
- 2011–2014: Navy (assistant)
- 2015–2021: Longwood

Head coaching record
- Overall: 122–219
- Tournaments: Big South: 3–6; NCAA: 0–0

Ryan Mau (born November 27, 1978) is an American college baseball coach. He pitched one season at Flagler and three at College of Charleston before two seasons in the Miami Marlins organization and one in independent baseball. His coaching career began at Charleston Southern, where he served as pitching coach for one year. He next moved to Marist for two seasons, guiding the Metro Atlantic Athletic Conference pitcher and relief pitcher of the year en route to the MAAC regular season and tournament championship and an NCAA Regional appearance. Next, he moved to VMI where he rose to associate head coach. He helped the Keydets to a school record in wins and their first national rankings, while his pitching staff set school records and ranked among the nation's leaders is several categories. He next moved to Navy, where he served as recruiting coordinator and pitching and catching coach. He helped the Midshipmen to an NCAA Regional appearance. He then served as the head coach of the Longwood Lancers (2015–2021).

== Head coaching record ==
Record table
Season	Team	Overall	Conference	Standing	Postseason
Longwood Lancers (Big South Conference) (2015–2021)
2015	Longwood	22–34	9–15	8th	Big South Tournament
2016	Longwood	32–27	14–10	T-2nd	Big South Tournament
2017	Longwood	19–34	7–17	10th	
2018	Longwood	17–38	9–18	7th	Big South Tournament
2019	Longwood	11–41	5–22	10th	
2020	Longwood	4–13	0–0		Season canceled due to COVID-19
2021	Longwood	17–32	10–24	10th	
Longwood:		122–219	54–106		
Total:		122–219			
National champion Postseason invitational champion Conference regular season champion Conference regular season and conference tournament champion Division regular season champion Division regular season and conference tournament champion Conference tournament champion
