= Al Worthington =

American baseball player (1929–2026)

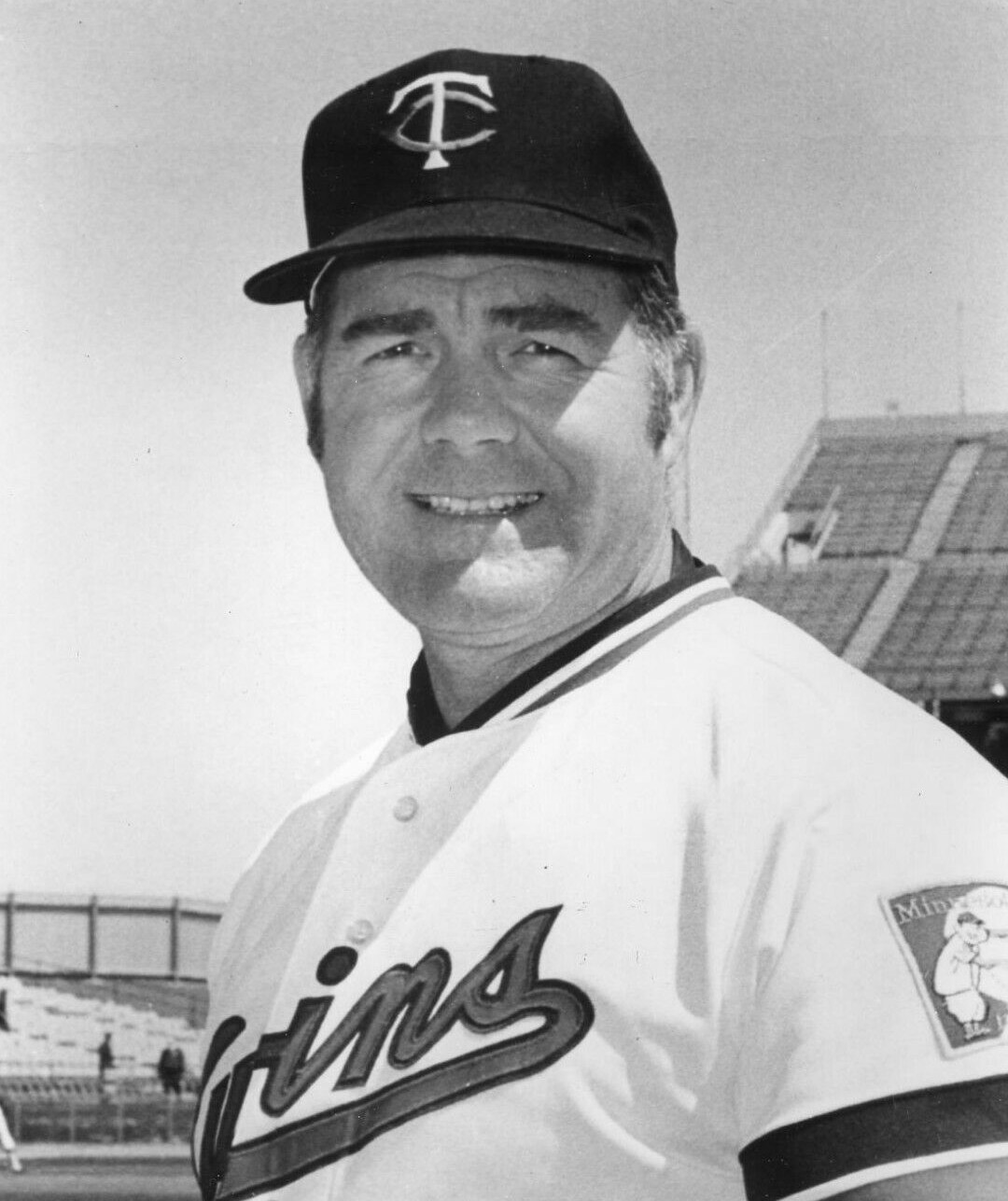
- Worthington in 1972 as a coach for the Minnesota Twins
- Pitcher
- Born: February 5, 1929; Birmingham, Alabama, U.S.
- Died: June 18, 2026 (aged 97); Sterrett, Alabama, U.S.
- Batted: Right Threw: Right

MLB debut
- July 6, 1953, for the New York Giants

Last MLB appearance
- October 2, 1969, for the Minnesota Twins

MLB statistics
- Win–loss record: 75–82
- Earned run average: 3.39
- Strikeouts: 834
- Saves: 111
- Stats at Baseball Reference

Teams
- New York / San Francisco Giants (1953–1954, 1956–1959); Boston Red Sox (1960); Chicago White Sox (1960); Cincinnati Reds (1963–1964); Minnesota Twins (1964–1969)

Career highlights and awards
- World Series champion (1954)

Allan Fulton Worthington (February 5, 1929 – June 18, 2026), nicknamed "Red", was an American professional baseball pitcher. He played all or part of 14 seasons in Major League Baseball (MLB) for the New York / San Francisco Giants (1953–1954, 1956–1959), Boston Red Sox (1960), Chicago White Sox (1960), Cincinnati Reds (1963–1964), and Minnesota Twins (1964–1969). Worthington batted and threw right-handed.

Raised in Birmingham, Alabama, Worthington played baseball at the University of Alabama before becoming a professional. Acquired by the Giants in 1953, he began his career with the ballclub as a starter, pitching shutouts in his first two major league games. After spending most of 1954 and all of 1955 in the minor leagues, he became a full-time starter again in 1956. During 1957–58, he split his time between the rotation and the bullpen, and by 1959 he was almost exclusively used as a relief pitcher. He split 1960 between the Red Sox, the minor leagues, and the White Sox, retiring with about a month left in the season because the White Sox were engaged in ruses to steal opposing team's signs, and he could not play for the team with a clear conscience. He completed his degree at Howard College, then decided to return to baseball and spent two years in the minor leagues for the White Sox. The Reds acquired him in 1963, and Worthington posted a 2.99 earned run average (ERA) out of the bullpen for them that year. He began 1964 with Cincinnati, was sent to the minor leagues, and had his contract purchased by the Twins, with whom he would spend the rest of his career. Sports Illustrated called his 1.37 ERA with the team that year "impressive". In 1965, Worthington had a career-high 21 saves and a career-low 2.13 ERA, also winning 10 games. From 1966 to 1967 he saved 32 games, and in 1968 he led American League (AL) relievers with 18 saves. In a 14-year career, Worthington compiled a 75–82 record with 834 strikeouts, a 3.39 ERA, and 110 saves in 1,246 2/3 innings pitched.

Worthington continued with his career in baseball after his retirement as a player. In 1972 and 1973, he served as the pitching coach for the Twins. Then, in 1973, he heard a radio commercial for Liberty University. Worthington contacted Liberty president Jerry Falwell and told him that the school should have a good Christian baseball coach; he was hired to create the school's baseball team. After their first season, the ballclub never had a losing record under Worthington again. He coached them until after the 1986 season, when Bobby Richardson replaced him. While he was still coaching, he became Liberty's Athletic Director, a position he held until his retirement in 1989. In May 2011, he was inducted into the Alabama Sports Hall of Fame. Worthington died in June 2026 at the age of 97.

== Early life ==
Allan Fulton Worthington was born on February 5, 1929, in Birmingham, Alabama. He was the seventh of ten children of newspaper compositor Walter B. Worthington and his wife, Lake Worthington. Walter played amateur baseball locally, and two of Al's older brothers, Robert and Walter, played Minor League baseball as well. Growing up, Al went to Inglenook Elementary School and Phillips High School in Birmingham. He attended the University of Alabama, where he played baseball and football. The football team used him sparingly, though, and he stopped playing football during his sophomore year because he suffered a left arm and shoulder injury that was not healing quickly. The Advocate considered him "lanky" for a baseball pitcher, but Worthington caught the eye of Birmingham railroad employee Dickey Martin while pitching against a local team in 1951. Martin recommended Worthington to his friend Larry Gilbert, manager of the Nashville Volunteers of the Double-A Southern Association, who signed the Alabama pitcher to a $1,500 contract in 1951.

== Nashville Volunteers (1951–1952) ==
With Nashville in 1951, Worthington won his first two starts. He appeared in 23 games (21 starts), posting a 7–10 record and a 4.57 earned run average (ERA) in 124 innings pitched. He did not pitch well to begin the 1952 season; new manager Hugh Poland said the pitcher was "trying to throw too hard for his own good." As the season went on, he improved, evidenced on August 24 when he allowed one run and six hits in 14 innings against the Little Rock Travelers. He finished the year making 30 starts in 41 appearances, posting a 13–13 record and a 3.54 ERA in 221 innings pitched.

== New York/San Francisco Giants (1953–1959) ==
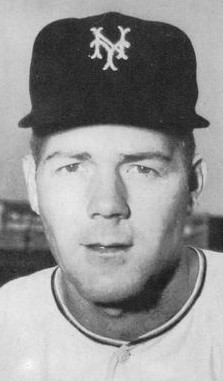
Worthington played for the New York / San Francisco Giants from 1953 to 1954 and 1956 to 1959.

In April 1953, the New York Giants purchased Worthington's contract and assigned him to their Triple-A affiliate, the Minneapolis Millers of the American Association (AA), where he had a 9–5 record and a 2.90 ERA. In July, he was called up by the Giants, who added him to their starting rotation. Making his major league debut on July 6, he allowed two hits in a complete game shutout over the Philadelphia Phillies. He allowed four hits in his next start against the Brooklyn Dodgers on July 11, also a shutout, becoming the first National League (NL) pitcher to start his career with consecutive shutouts since Jay Hughes did so for the Baltimore Orioles in 1898. Worthington then lost his next three starts, but his ERA remained under 1.00; in one of the games, he allowed seven runs, but only one was earned. He would go on to lose eight straight decisions, however, before picking up a win on September 19, allowing one run in 8 1/3 innings pitched in the first game of a doubleheader against the Pittsburgh Pirates. He won his final start of the season, also against the Pirates, on September 25, allowing two unearned runs in a complete game, 6–2 victory. In 20 games (17 starts), he had a 4–8 record, a 3.44 ERA, 52 strikeouts, 54 walks, and 103 hits allowed in 102 innings pitched.

Worthington failed to make the Giants' roster out of spring training in 1954, but he was the top pitcher at Minneapolis, posting an 11–7 record, a 4.32 ERA, and 93 strikeouts in 152 innings pitched for the Millers through July 29. On that date, he was promoted by the Giants to bolster their pitching staff. Worthington mainly pitched out of the bullpen for the Giants in 1954, though he made one start in the second game of a doubleheader against the St. Louis Cardinals on August 29, allowing three runs in four innings and taking a no decision in a 7–4 Giants victory. In 10 games for New York, Worthington had an 0–2 record, a 3.50 ERA, eight strikeouts, 15 walks, and 21 hits allowed in 18 innings pitched. The Giants won the NL pennant that year, and though Worthington did not pitch in the 1954 World Series, he on New York's roster as the Giants swept the Cleveland Indians in four games.

In 1955, Worthington spent the entire season with Minneapolis. He led the American Association with 19 wins, losing 10 games and tying for fifth in the league in strikeouts (150) while posting a 3.58 ERA. With his help, the Millers defeated the Rochester Red Wings to win the Junior World Series.

The Giants hoped for improvement from Worthington in 1956; manager Bill Rigney, discussing him and two other young players, said, "If these three come through, we could go places." In his second start on April 28, he allowed six hits and three runs (one earned) in a complete game, 5–3 victory over the Phillies. On June 16, he pitched 11 innings and allowed just five singles but suffered the loss in a 3–1 defeat to the Cincinnati Redlegs. Four days later, he allowed one run in a complete game and was rewarded for his efforts in a 4–1 victory over the Chicago Cubs. Later in the season, he missed over a month, not pitching between July 25 and August 28 because of a sore arm. With a 5–14 record after September 17, he won his last two starts of the year, including a game against Philadelphia on September 22 when he allowed one run in a complete game, 2–1 victory. Worthington appeared in 28 games for the Giants in 1956, making what would be a career-high 20 starts. He tied for sixth in the NL in losses (14, tied with Sam Jones, Tom Poholsky, and Vinegar Bend Mizell), posted a 3.97 ERA, struck out 95 batters, walked 74 batters, and allowed 158 hits in 165 2/3 innings.

Worthington started three of his first four games for the Giants in 1957, but after posting a 12.75 ERA, he was then used mostly out of the bullpen, though he still made occasional starts. On May 11, relieving Joe Margoneri to start the ninth inning of a 5–5 tie against the Brooklyn Dodgers, Worthington threw seven shutout innings, picking up the win as the Giants prevailed in the 15th on a Valmy Thomas home run. Four days later, he allowed two runs in 8 1/3 innings, but the first allowed the Cardinals to tie the game in the seventh, and the second allowed them to win the game 6–5 in the 14th. Used for a start in the second game of a doubleheader on August 18, he held the Phillies to three hits in a 1–0, shutout victory. Five days later, he pitched 10 innings and held the Cubs to two runs, getting a no decision in an eventual 3–2 Giants victory. He made three more starts through September 5 before moving back to the bullpen for the rest of the year. In 55 games (12 starts), he had an 8–11 record, a 4.22 ERA, 90 strikeouts, 56 walks, and 140 hits allowed in 157 2/3 innings pitched.

In 1958, the Giants moved to San Francisco; Worthington started the fourth game of the year for the ballclub, then worked out of the bullpen after that. Against the Los Angeles Dodgers on May 13, he worked six innings of relief, blowing a 7–6 lead when Gil Hodges hit a home run against him in the third inning but earning the win as the Giants prevailed 16–9. Given a start on June 15, he allowed eight hits but just one unearned run in a 3–1 victory over the Phillies. From that day forth, he was used mainly as a starter until August 6, after which he was exclusively used out of the bullpen for the rest of the year. He held the Pirates to one run over nine innings in the first game of a doubleheader on July 27 but got a no-decision in a 14-inning, 2–1 loss. In 54 games (12 starts), he had an 11–7 record, a 3.63 ERA, 76 strikeouts, 57 walks, and 152 hits allowed in 151 1/3 innings.

Worthington held out during 1959 spring training hoping for a salary raise, which he was granted, but he was pitching for the Giants again by the time they played their first game. He made starts on August 22 and 27, a day after and the day of a Giants doubleheader, respectively. In the August 22 start, he allowed one run and three hits in six innings, earning the win as the Giants beat the Phillies 8–1. Other than that, except for a June 18 start, he pitched exclusively out of the bullpen. Between June 24 and August 8, he made only three appearances. Discovering in September that the Giants were having an employee steal opposing team's signs, observing them from the grandstands with binoculars and relaying them to the Giants' dugout, he confronted Rigney about the fact. "I told Bill that I had been talking to church groups, telling people you don't have to lie or cheat in this world if you trust Jesus Christ," said Worthington. "How could I go on saying those things if I was winning games because my team was cheating?" Rigney, who had been friends with Worthington since the pitcher's minor league tenure, promised to stop the practice. In 42 games (three starts), Worthington had a 2–3 record, a 3.68 ERA, 45 strikeouts, 37 walks, and 68 hits in 73 1/3 innings pitched.

== Boston Red Sox/Chicago White Sox (1960) ==
In 1960, Worthington attended spring training with the Giants but was traded to the Boston Red Sox for Jim Marshall on March 29. The Red Sox planned to use him as a relief pitcher but sent him to their Triple-A team (which happened to be the Millers) in early May after he posted a 7.71 ERA in six games. When Boston's manager, Billy Jurges, was asked why Worthington had made so many appearances, he responded, "I had to find out about him." Grimacing, he continued, "I guess I found out." At Minneapolis, Worthington had what Bill Nowlin of the Society for American Baseball Research called an "excellent" 2.04 ERA, posting an 11–9 record and striking out 100 over 150 innings pitched in 37 games (11 starts). On August 29, the Chicago White Sox purchased his contract.

Worthington made four relief appearances for the White Sox, posting a 1–1 record and a 3.38 ERA. Shortly after he arrived, he discovered the team was using a flashing light on the Comiskey Park scoreboard to steal signs. The Chicago Tribune reported (in 1987) that he had been asked to sit in the stands and steal signs himself as well with binoculars. Though he complained to manager Al López and general manager Hank Greenberg, the scheme continued. Not able to continue playing for the team with a clear conscience, Worthington voluntarily retired with a month left in the season. "A coach picking up signs, that's part of the game," he said, "but this other now ... Baseball ought to be played on the up and up. When it's not, that's the time to quit."

== Retirement, return (1961–1962) ==
Returning to Birmingham, Worthington enrolled at Howard College in the fall of 1960, hoping to finish his degree and pursue a coaching career. In May 1961, he decided to return to baseball. According to Greenberg, the White Sox (who still had Worthington's rights) had tried unsuccessfully to trade him. They permitted him to play for the San Diego Padres, their Triple-A team in the Pacific Coast League. On August 26, 1961, Worthington threw the first no-hitter ever for San Diego, shutting out the Hawaii Islanders in a 5–0 victory. In 23 games (12 starts), he had a 9–10 record, a 3.55 ERA, 74 strikeouts, 49 walks, and 86 hits allowed in 109 innings pitched. The White Sox made their Triple-A affiliate the Indianapolis Indians of the AA in 1962; used as a starter this time, Worthington had a 15–4 record, ranking among the AA leaders in several categories. His 15 wins tied with Frank Kreutzer's total for third, his .789 winning percentage led the league, his 2.94 ERA was second to Connie Grob's 2.86 mark (among pitchers who threw at least 150 innings), his three shutouts were tied with Kreutzer and Gary Peters for second, his 217 innings pitched ranked third, and his 149 strikeouts were two behind Chi-Chi Olivo's total. This attracted interest from other teams, and the New York Mets were prematurely and erroneously reported by The New York Times and the Associated Press to have purchased his contract in October.

== Cincinnati Reds (1963–1964) ==
Worthington was selected by the Cincinnati Reds in the Rule 5 draft on November 26, 1962 instead. A part of Cincinnati's bullpen in 1963, he made his first appearance in the major leagues in three years on April 10, allowing four runs (three earned) in one inning in a 10–7 loss to the Phillies. On May 15, he relieved Jim Maloney to begin the sixth inning and threw four scoreless innings, earning the save in a 10–2 victory over the Cubs. (Note: The save did not become an official statistic until 1969, but using the definition of the statistic, statisticians have been able to retroactively award them.) Exactly two months later, he entered in the ninth and struck out six in four scoreless innings, earning the win as the Reds defeated the Milwaukee Braves 4–3 in 12 innings. On September 17, with one out in the second and the Reds trailing the Houston Colt .45s by a score of 3–2, Worthington relieved Joe Nuxhall and pitched 7 1/3 scoreless innings, earning the win in a 4–3 victory. At a team party late in the year, his teammates gave him a pair of binoculars as a joke. In 50 games, he had a 4–4 record, a 2.99 ERA, 55 strikeouts, 31 walks, and 75 hits allowed in 81 1/3 innings pitched.

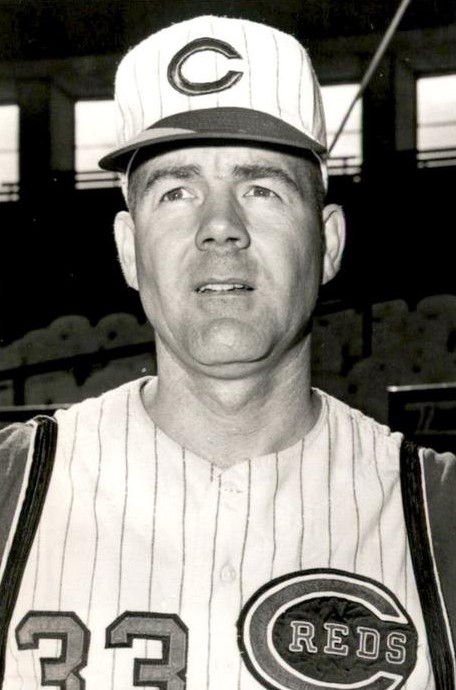
Worthington with the Cincinnati Reds in 1963.

Worthington began 1964 with the Reds as well but was sent to San Diego (now Cincinnati's Triple-A affiliate) after posting a 10.29 ERA in six games. "It always takes me a while to get going in the spring," he said. With San Diego, he made 10 appearances (two starts), posting a 4–1 record, a 3.18 ERA, 30 strikeouts, eight walks, and 29 hits allowed in 34 innings. On June 26, his contract was purchased by the Minnesota Twins.

== Minnesota Twins (1964–1969) ==
"It was in Minnesota that Worthington enjoyed his greatest success, working as the team's top relief pitcher for most of the next six seasons," reporter Creg Stephenson wrote. With Minnesota, Worthington was often used at the end of games, accumulating 14 saves in approximately half a season. He gave up no earned runs in his first 20 appearances with the ballclub, though he did allow three unearned runs and take the loss in the first game of a doubleheader against the New York Yankees on July 4. Ultimately, he allowed earned runs in just five of the 41 games he appeared in for Minnesota and had a 1.37 ERA with the Twins in 1964, which Sports Illustrated called "impressive". He had a 5–6 record, struck out 59 batters, walked 27 hitters, and allowed 47 hits in 72 1/3 innings.

With Minnesota in 1965, Worthington had the lowest ERA of any Twins pitcher (2.13, the lowest of his career) for a team that won 102 games and the American League (AL) pennant. From July 25 through July 31, he won three straight appearances without allowing a run, pitching three scoreless innings against the Washington Senators in the second game of a July 27 doubleheader. On August 30, he entered in the seventh after Jim Kaat had allowed a run and threw three scoreless innings in an eventual 11-inning, 3–2 victory over the Detroit Tigers. In 62 games, he had a 10–7 record, a 2.13 ERA, 59 strikeouts, 41 walks, and 57 hits in 80 1/3 innings. He had a career-high 21 saves, which ranked sixth in the AL. The Twins faced the Dodgers in the 1965 World Series, and Worthington was used twice. He relieved Mudcat Grant in the sixth inning of Game 4 with no outs, runners on second and third, and the Twins trailing 3–2. The first batter, Ron Fairly, had an RBI single that scored both runners, and he scored on the next play when Worthington made an errant throw to first base on a Lou Johnson sacrifice bunt. He finished the inning and threw a scoreless seventh, but the Twins lost 7–2. After Kaat allowed three hits and two runs to start the fourth inning of Game 7, Worthington relieved him, this time not allowing any runners to score in his two innings of work. The Twins lost 2–0 as the Dodgers became World Series champions.

On April 24, 1966, Worthington struck out six batters in 2 2/3 innings, allowing a run but earning the save as the Twins beat the California Angels 5–3. 12 days later, he gave up a home run to George Scott that tied a game against the Red Sox but struck out five in three innings and picked up the win as Minnesota defeated Boston 4–3. In a game against the Baltimore Orioles on May 30, he entered with two outs in the sixth after Dwight Siebler had allowed three runs in the inning. Following a walk to Brooks Robinson, Worthington induced a foul pop fly from Curt Blefary to end the inning, but he gave up a run in the eighth, allowing the Orioles to tie the game. However, the Twins scored three times in the bottom of the inning, and Worthington pitched a scoreless ninth as the Twins prevailed by a score of 7–4. In 65 games, he had a 6–3 record, 16 saves, a 2.46 ERA, 93 strikeouts, 27 walks, and 66 hits allowed in 91 1/3 innings.

After the Red Sox scored twice in the ninth inning of a game on May 5, 1967, Worthington faced the tying run with two outs and runners on first and third but struck out Mike Andrews to end the ballgame. In the second game of a doubleheader against the Orioles on July 11, he allowed three runs in three innings but got the save in a 10–7 triumph, striking out five hitters, his second-highest total of the season. On August 9, he entered in the eighth and threw a season-long 8 2/3 innings, allowing just two hits and no runs but getting a no-decision as the Senators beat the Twins 9–7 in 20 innings. He threw a scoreless eighth and ninth inning on August 28, preserving a 3–2 victory over Baltimore. The Twins were in a close pennant race with the Red Sox, with the outcome hanging on the final game of the year on October 1, where Minnesota faced Boston. The Red Sox were already winning 3–2 in the ninth when Worthington entered and threw two wild pitches, allowing another run to score. The Twins lost 5–3. In 59 games, Worthington had an 8–9 record, 16 saves, a 2.84 ERA, 80 strikeouts, 38 walks (though 10 were intentional), and 77 hits allowed in 92 innings.

On April 25, 1968, Worthington pitched 3 2/3 scoreless innings to finish the game and earn the save as the Twins defeated the Chicago White Sox by a score of 3–2. In both that outing and his next on April 30, he struck out a season-high five batters. He entered a game against the Oakland Athletics on May 16, pitching three scoreless innings to finish the game as the Twins rallied from a 3–2 deficit to win 4–3. After the Athletics scored three runs in the eighth inning, putting runners on first and second with two outs and the Twins leading 7–5, Worthington relieved Kaat and got John Donaldson to ground out, then pitched a scoreless ninth as the Twins won 7–5. In 1968, he led the AL with 18 saves. Worthington made 54 appearances, posting a 4–5 record, a 2.71 ERA, 57 strikeouts, 32 walks (nine of which were intentional), and 67 strikeouts in 76 1/3 innings pitched.

Worthington retired for a second time after the 1968 season, but in May 1969, Twins' manager Billy Martin convinced him to come back. "It took me a while to get back in shape," Worthington said, but he made scoreless appearances in his first three games, starting June 8. He allowed a run on June 14, though, then saw his ERA shoot up to 17.18 as he gave up six runs in 2/3 in an inning on June 17, in a 13–1 loss to the Angels. Over his next 25 games through August 7, he had a 2.20 ERA before posting a 7.71 ERA in his final 16 games. In the first game of a doubleheader against the White Sox on July 16, he allowed one run in four innings and earned the win as the Twins prevailed by a score of 9–8. On July 25, he relieved Jim Perry with two outs and a runner on third in the seventh inning of a game against the Indians, striking out Chuck Hinton to keep the score 2–0. Tasked with finishing the game, he blew the lead in the ninth when Duke Sims hit a tying two-run home run against him. However, he threw a scoreless 10th and 11th innings, and the Twins ultimately prevailed 4–2 in 16 innings. In 46 games, Worthington had a 4–1 record, though his 4.57 ERA was his highest since 1960 and he only had three saves. He struck out 51 batters and walked 20, giving up 65 hits in 61 innings. The Twins won the newly created AL West division title and faced the Orioles in the inaugural AL Championship Series. Worthington relieved Tom Hall with the Twins trailing 5–1 and pitched a scoreless fifth inning. However, after retiring Jim Palmer to start the sixth, he allowed three straight hits, including an RBI single to Frank Robinson, before he was replaced on the mound by Joe Grzenda. It was his last major league appearance, as the Orioles swept the Twins in three games.

In a 14-year career, Worthington compiled a 75–82 record with 834 strikeouts, a 3.39 ERA, and 110 saves in 1,246 2/3 innings pitched.

== Pitching style ==
Worthington was a sinkerball pitcher who also threw a slider and curveball. "The best pitches I had? My fastball slid and sank. It was a natural slider that also sunk. I didn't have a thing to do with that. Just put my hand on it. God gave me that. It just sunk. Then I had a curveball. Those were my two pitches," Worthington said. Sal Maglie, a teammate of Worthington with the Giants and later his pitching coach with Boston, told The Boston Globe that the pitcher was "pretty quick and had a good sinker .... He has developed a good slider and curve to go with his fast sinker, and I believe he will help [the Red Sox]." The Associated Press called his slider "elegant". Earl Battey, who caught Worthington with the Twins, said, "He gives you that big motion and keeps the ball down and throws at the corners ... an amazing pitcher."

== Coaching career ==
Following his major league career, Worthington sold life insurance for two years. After that, he replaced the retired Marv Grissom as the pitching coach for the Twins, serving in that capacity from 1972 through 1973. In 1974, he joined Liberty University in Lynchburg, Virginia, where he helped start the Liberty University Flames baseball team, becoming the ballclub's first head coach. Worthington first found out about Liberty in 1973 when he heard Jerry Falwell speaking about it on the radio. Calling him, Worthington said the school should have a good Christian baseball coach; he wanted the job no matter what the salary. He served 13 seasons as the Flames' head coach, and the team's first season was its only losing one under his tenure. As of 2010, he was the winningest head coach in Liberty's history, with a 343–189–1 record (64.4 winning percentage). Future major leaguers Sid Bream, Lee Guetterman, and Randy Tomlin all played for him at Liberty. He was named Liberty's athletic director on December 19, 1983. Bobby Richardson succeeded him as head coach in 1987, but Worthington remained involved with the team as its pitching coach. Under his tenure as athletic director, the baseball team achieved NCAA Division I status in 1988. Worthington retired in 1989. Liberty Field, the team's first permanent home which opened in 1979, was renamed Al Worthington Field in 1986. In 1995, it was again renamed, this time to Al Worthington Stadium. It was replaced by Liberty Baseball Stadium in 2013, but the new ballpark was rededicated as Worthington Field at Liberty Baseball Stadium in 2019. In 1980, Worthington managed the Falmouth Commodores, a collegiate summer baseball team in the prestigious Cape Cod Baseball League. He led the Commodores to the league title with a team featuring future major leaguers Steve Lombardozzi and Bream. After his retirement from Liberty, Worthington returned to Birmingham and served as the pitching coach for Briarwood Christian School. In 2011, he was inducted into the Alabama Sports Hall of Fame.

== Personal life and death ==
Worthington's nickname was "Red". He married Shirley Reusse in December 1950, while still in college. The couple had five children, three boys and two girls. Like his father, the oldest son played baseball at Alabama. Though Worthington grew up going to church, he and Shirley became born-again Christians in 1958 on the second night of attending a Billy Graham Crusade at the Cow Palace in San Francisco. "I'd been going to church since I was six," he said, "and I'd always wanted to go to heaven, but I'd never understood how." In an interview with Al.com in 2020, he said, "I have to give God all the credit. He's the one who's blessed me all these years. Ever since I've been saved, it's been a great life." Worthington and Shirley were married for 73 years until her death from cancer in 2024.

Worthington died on June 18, 2026, at the age of 97.

== See also ==
- List of Major League Baseball annual saves leaders
