= Bolding =

Bolding may refer to:

== People ==
- Bolding (surname)

== Places ==
- Bolding, Arkansas, United States, an unincorporated community
- Bolding Stadium, a baseball venue in Farmville, Virginia, United States

== Other uses ==
- Bolding, the present participle of bold; see emphasis (typography)
