= Al Worthington Stadium =

Baseball venue in Lynchburg, Virginia

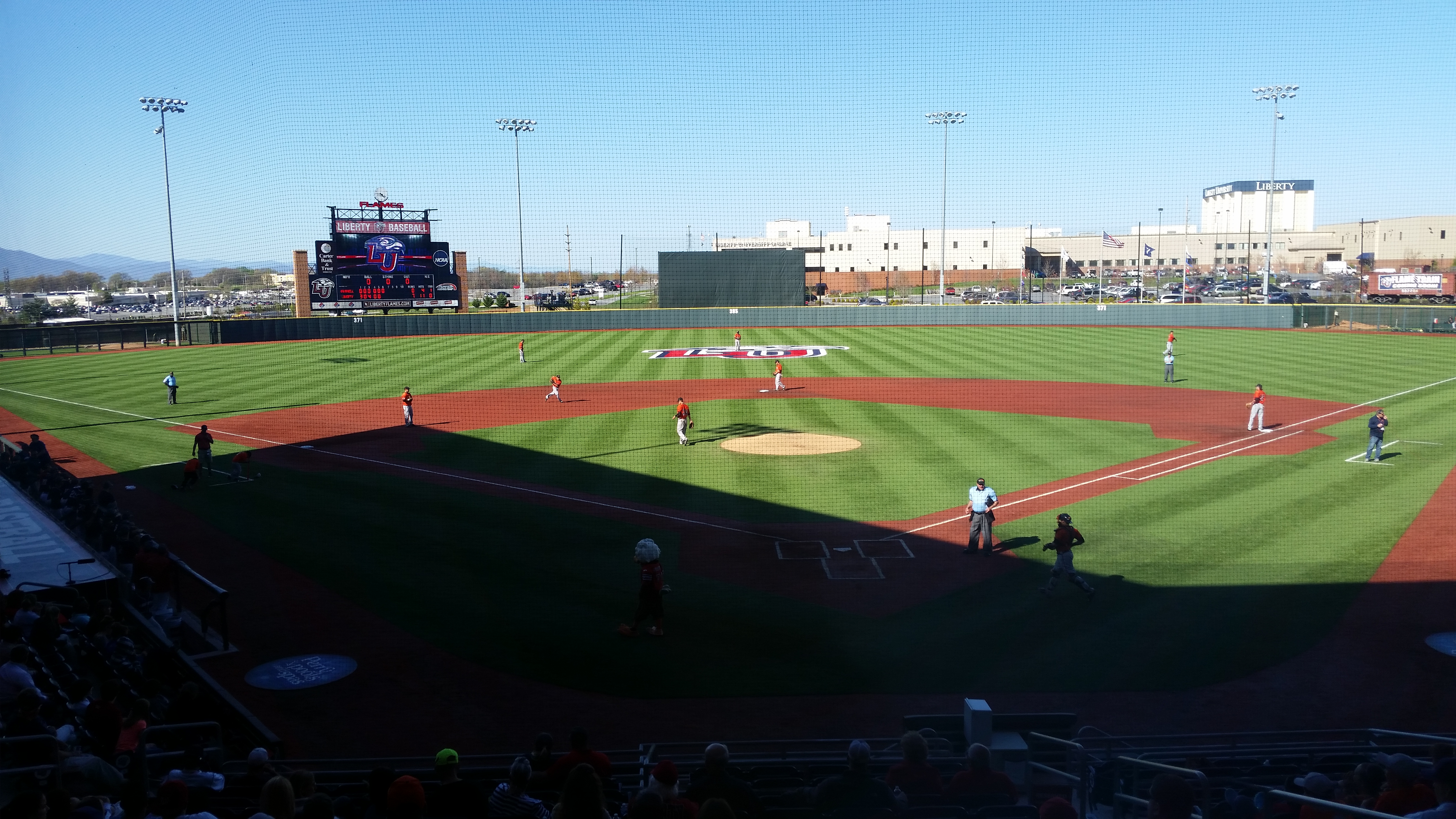
- LibertyBaseballStadium
- Interactive map of Al Worthington Stadium
- Former names: Liberty Field (1979-1986), Al Worthington Field (1986-1995)
- Location: Wards Road, Lynchburg, VA, United States
- Coordinates: 37.353588°N 79.180379°W
- Owner: Liberty University
- Operator: Liberty University
- Capacity: 2,500
- Executive suites: Yes
- Surface: FieldTurf collar around home plate, bermuda grass infield (1999-present), natural grass outfield
- Scoreboard: Electronic
- Record attendance: 3,183 (March 28, 2008, vs. Coastal Carolina)

Construction
- Opened: 1979
- Renovated: 1999, 2000, 2003, 2006, 2008
- Expanded: 2008
- Closed: 2012
- Demolished: 2013

Tenant
- Liberty Flames baseball (NCAA DI Big South) (1979-2012)

Al Worthington Stadium was a baseball venue on the campus of Liberty University in Lynchburg, Virginia, United States. It was home to the Liberty Flames of the Division I Big South Conference. Opened in 1979, the facility was named for former Liberty baseball coach and athletic director Al Worthington. It had a capacity of 2,500 spectators. Plans for a new Liberty baseball venue were announced in August 2011, and Liberty Baseball Stadium opened prior to the 2013 season. Worthington Stadium was demolished in 2013.

== History ==
The venue opened in 1979 as Liberty Field. Al Worthington was Liberty's head coach at the time. On May 3, 1986, the field was dedicated Al Worthington Field.

In 1995, the venue's name was again changed, this time to Al Worthington Stadium. In 1998, the stadium won Sports Turf Magazine's "Diamond of the Year" award.

Beginning in 1999, the stadium underwent a series of renovations. In that year, a 5,200 ft.² hitting complex was added, located down the left field line. Also, in 1999, the infield was resurfaced with bermuda grass. A new PA system and backstop were installed in 2000. 2003 construction added an indoor hitting facility, luxury boxes, and a clubhouse. Renovations completed in 2008 added stadium lighting and additional seating, which raised capacity by 600-700 spectators.

With the addition of stadium lighting, Worthington Stadium's first night game was played on March 28, 2008. On the same night, the stadium set a new attendance record of 3,183 spectators. Liberty lost the game to Coastal Carolina 5-3 in 11 innings.

In August 2011, the university announced plans for a new baseball venue. The plans called for the venue to be built near Williams Stadium, the university's football venue, and to hold 3,000 spectators. The project was projected to cost roughly $5 million. The announcement included plans for Worthington Stadium to become a softball venue.

The stadium closed following the 2012 season. Its final game was played on May 13, 2012, in which High Point defeated Liberty 13-11. It was demolished in 2013.

== Naming ==
The venue was named for Al Worthington. Following a fourteen-season major league career, Worthington came to Liberty in 1974. As the Flames' baseball coach from 1974 to 1986, Worthington compiled a 343-189-1 record. In each of the last 12 of Worthington's 13 seasons, the program had a winning record.

After being named Liberty's athletic director in 1983, Worthington continued to coach baseball until 1986. On May 3, 1986, Liberty's baseball field was dedicated to Worthington during his final home game as baseball coach. The Flames defeated Maryland 19-3.
