= 2013 Big South Conference baseball tournament =

- Teams: 8
- Format: Double-elimination
- Finals site: Liberty Baseball Stadium; Lynchburg, VA
- Champions: Liberty (4th title)
- Winning coach: Jim Toman (1st title)
- MVP: Ashton Perritt (Liberty)

2013 Big South Conference baseball standings
	Conf.						Overall
Team	W		L		T	PCT	W		L		T	PCT
North
Campbell ^{x}‍‍‍	19	–	5	–	0	.792	49	–	10	–	0	.831
High Point ‍‍‍	15	–	9	–	0	.625	29	–	29	–	0	.500
Radford ‍‍‍	14	–	10	–	0	.583	30	–	26	–	0	.536
Liberty ‍‍‡‍^{y}	13	–	11	–	0	.542	36	–	29	–	0	.554
Longwood ‍‍‍	12	–	12	–	0	.500	26	–	28	–	0	.481
VMI ‍‍‍	6	–	18	–	0	.250	20	–	35	–	0	.364
South
Coastal Carolina ^{x}‍‍‍^{y}	18	–	6	–	0	.750	37	–	23	–	0	.617
Gardner-Webb ‍‍‍	12	–	11	–	0	.522	29	–	27	–	1	.518
Charleston Southern ‍‍‍	11	–	13	–	0	.458	22	–	34	–	0	.393
Presbyterian ‍‍‍	10	–	14	–	0	.417	24	–	32	–	0	.429
Winthrop ‍‍‍	8	–	15	–	0	.348	21	–	33	–	0	.389
UNC Asheville ‍‍‍	4	–	18	–	0	.182	16	–	35	–	0	.314
x – Division champion ‡ – Tournament champion y – Invited to the NCAA tournament As of June 30, 2013; Rankings from Collegiate Baseball

The 2013 Big South Conference baseball tournament was held from May 21 through 25. The top eight regular season finishers of the conference's twelve teams met in the double-elimination tournament, which was held at Liberty Baseball Stadium on the campus of Liberty University in Lynchburg, Virginia. In the championship game, fifth-seeded Liberty defeated first-seeded Campbell, 2-1, to win its fourth tournament championship. As a result, Liberty earned the conference's automatic bid to the 2013 NCAA Division I baseball tournament.

== Seeding and format ==
With the introduction of division play in 2013, the division winners were seeded one and two, and the next six finishers from the regular season, regardless of division, were seeded three through eight based on conference winning percentage only. The teams played a two bracket, double-elimination tournament, with the winners of each bracket facing off in a single elimination final.

Team	W	L	Pct.	GB	Seed
North Division
Campbell	19	5	.792	–	1
High Point	15	9	.625	4	3
Radford	14	10	.583	5	4
Liberty	13	11	.542	6	5
Longwood	12	12	.500	7	7
VMI	6	18	.250	13	–
South Division
Coastal Carolina	18	6	.750	–	2
Gardner-Webb	12	11	.522	5.5	6
Charleston Southern	11	13	.458	7	8
Presbyterian	10	14	.417	8	–
Winthrop	8	15	.348	9.5	–
UNC Asheville	4	18	.182	13	–

== Results ==
First round
1	Campbell	4
8	Charleston Southern	0
4	Radford	6
5	Liberty	3
8	Charleston Southern	1
5	Liberty	2
2	Coastal Carolina	6
7	Longwood	1
3	High Point	2
6	Gardner-Webb	8
7	Longwood	11
3	High Point	3

Second round
1	Campbell	4
4	Radford	3
4	Radford	2
5	Liberty	3
2	Coastal Carolina	3
6	Gardner-Webb	2
6	Gardner-Webb	5
7	Longwood	6

Semifinals
2	Coastal Carolina	8
5	Liberty	9
1	Campbell	8
7	Longwood	6

Final
5	Liberty	2
1	Campbell	1

== All-Tournament Team ==
The following players were named to the All-Tournament Team.

POS	Player	Team
INF	Michael Felton	Campbell
INF	Dalton Britt	Liberty
INF	Jake Kimble	Liberty
INF	Matt Dickason	Longwood
OF	Alex Buccilli	Coastal Carolina
OF	Colton Convicka	Longwood
OF	Justin Sizemore	Liberty
C	Trey Wimmer	Liberty
P	Ryan Thompson	Campbell
P	Blake Fulghum	Liberty
DH	Ted Blackman	Coastal Carolina
UTL	Ashton Perritt	Liberty

=== Most Valuable Player ===
Liberty outfielder/pitcher Ashton Perritt was named the tournament's Most Valuable Player.
