= Jim Toman =

American baseball coach (1961–2026)

- Toman in 2014

Biographical details
- Born: November 28, 1961; Monroeville, Pennsylvania, U.S.
- Died: August 4, 2026 (aged 64); Columbia, South Carolina, U.S.
- Education: North Carolina State University '85

Playing career
- 1981–1984: NC State

Coaching career (HC unless noted)
- 1989: FIU (asst.)
- 1990–1996: NC State (asst.)
- 1997–2007: South Carolina (asst.)
- 2008–2016: Liberty
- 2017–2018: College of Charleston (AHC)
- 2019–2022: Middle Tennessee

Head coaching record
- Overall: 406–308–2 (.568)
- Tournaments: NCAA DI: 2–4; Big South: 20–13; C-USA: 1–4

Accomplishments and honors

Championships
- Big South, North Division: 2014; Big South Tournament: 2013

Awards
- Big South Coach of the Year: 2014

James Michael Andrew Toman (November 28, 1961 – August 4, 2026) was an American college baseball player. He was the head coach of Liberty from the 2008 season until 2016. Under Toman, Liberty has qualified for two NCAA tournaments. He also served as the head coach of the Middle Tennessee Blue Raiders (2019–2022). He died on August 4, 2026 from brain cancer that he had been battling since first having been diagnosed in 2025.

== Playing career ==
Toman, a 1985 graduate of NC State, played baseball for the Wolfpack from 1981–1984. He served as a team captain in 1983 and 1984 and was named to the All-Tournament Team at the 1984 ACC tournament. His teammates included Doug Davis, Dan Plesac, Doug Strange, and Tracy Woodson. When Woodson became the head coach at Richmond ahead of the 2014 season, the two coached against each other.

== Coaching career ==
=== Assistant positions ===
After graduating, Toman worked as a high school coach for several years before starting his college coaching career in 1989 with a one-year stint at FIU. From 1989 to 1991 he was the pitching coach of the Brewster Whitecaps, a collegiate summer baseball team in the Cape Cod Baseball League. Toman returned to his alma mater to serve as an assistant to Ray Tanner at NC State; he held the position from 1990–1996. When Tanner left for South Carolina for the 1997 season, Toman went with him and worked as an assistant for the Gamecocks from 1997–2007. In 2002, he was named the ABCA/Baseball America Assistant Coach of the Year.

=== Liberty ===
Toman left South Carolina to become the head coach at Liberty for the 2008 season. At his introductory press conference, Toman said, "I am very honored and excited to accept the head coaching position at Liberty University. My wife and family are also very excited to join the Liberty family and work in a Christian environment. I have enjoyed my 11 years at the University of South Carolina and take away many fond memories. I appreciate the opportunity Ray Tanner gave me to be a member of his staff. I am ready to get started on putting a quality staff together and continuing to move the program forward, having success both in conference and nationally."

From 2008–2014, Toman's first seven seasons, Liberty won at least 30 games each year and at least 40 games three times. After losing in the Big South championship game in 2008, 2010, and 2012, the Flames reached their first NCAA tournament under Toman in 2013. In the Big South tournament, which Liberty hosted at the newly built Liberty Baseball Stadium, the Flames went 4–0 to win the championship; in the championship game, Liberty defeated top-seeded Campbell, 2–1, after an Ashton Perritt RBI single broke a 1–1 tie in the top of the ninth. At the Columbia Regional, the Flames went 2–2, beating second-seeded Clemson twice and losing to host South Carolina twice.

In 2014, Liberty qualified for the NCAA tournament with an at-large bid. The Flames won the Big South's North Division and swept the conference's major awards, with Toman winning Coach of the Year. At the Charlottesville Regional, the team went 0–2, losing games to Arkansas and Bucknell.

In 2011, Liberty set a Big South record with seven draftees. In 2012, the Flames had two players drafted in the top ten rounds.

On June 24, 2016, Toman resigned from Liberty as their baseball coach.

=== After Liberty ===
On August 4, 2017, it was announced that Toman would become the assistant head coach for the College of Charleston Cougars baseball team.

=== Middle Tennessee ===
On June 20, 2018, Toman was named the head coach of the Middle Tennessee Blue Raiders baseball program.

In August 2022, Toman resigned as MTSU's head coach.

== Death ==
Toman died of glioblastoma on August 4, 2026, at the age of 64.

== Head coaching record ==
Below is a table of Toman's yearly records as a collegiate head baseball coach.

Record table
Season	Team	Overall	Conference	Standing	Postseason
Liberty Flames (Big South Conference) (2008–2016)
2008	Liberty	35–26–1	14–7	T–2nd	
2009	Liberty	33–21	17–9	3rd	
2010	Liberty	43–18	19–8	2nd	
2011	Liberty	35–24	18–9	2nd	
2012	Liberty	41–19	14–10	3rd	
2013	Liberty	36–29	13–11	4th (North)	NCAA Regional
2014	Liberty	41–18	23–3	1st (North)	NCAA Regional
2015	Liberty	33–23	16–8	T–3rd	
2016	Liberty	31–28	12–12	6th	
Liberty:		328–206–1 (.614)	146–77 (.655)		
Middle Tennessee Blue Raiders (Conference USA) (2019–2022)
2019	Middle Tennessee	18–37	11–19	12th	
2020	Middle Tennessee	7–10	0–0		Season canceled due to COVID-19
2021	Middle Tennessee	24–29–1	12–19–1	4th (West)	C-USA tournament
2022	Middle Tennessee	29–26	17–13	T–6th	
Middle Tennessee:		78–102–1 (.434)	40–51–1 (.440)		
Total:		406–308–2 (.568)			
National champion Postseason invitational champion Conference regular season champion Conference regular season and conference tournament champion Division regular season champion Division regular season and conference tournament champion Conference tournament champion
