= Brian McCullough =

Biographical details
- Born: July 5, 1985 (age 41); Virginia Beach, Virginia, U.S.

Playing career
- 2004–2007: Longwood
- Position: Pitcher

Coaching career (HC unless noted)
- 2010–2013: Longwood (assistant)
- 2014: Longwood
- 2015: Siena (assistant)
- 2016–2017: Manhattan (assistant)

Head coaching record
- Overall: 22–33

Brian McCullough (born July 5, 1985) is an American former college baseball coach. He was Longwood's head coach in 2014. The Lancers went 22–33.

McCullough pitched for Longwood while it transitioned to Division I, setting Lancer records for innings pitched and strikeouts. He then played five seasons in independent baseball leagues, including the Frontier League, Northern League, and Atlantic League from 2007 through 2011. He accepted a position as an assistant coach at Longwood beginning with the 2010 season, serving as pitching coach and recruiting coordinator under Buddy Bolding, the 32-year head coach of the Lancers. After Bolding's retirement following the 2013 season, McCullough was elevated to the head coaching position.

McCullough was named the pitching coach for the Manhattan Jaspers baseball on July 10, 2015.

== Head coaching record ==
The following is a table of McCullough's yearly records as an NCAA head coach.

Record table
Season	Team	Overall	Conference	Standing	Postseason
Longwood Lancers (Big South Conference) (2014)
2014	Longwood	22–33	9–18	6th (North)	
Longwood:		22–33	9–18		
Total:		22–33			
National champion Postseason invitational champion Conference regular season champion Conference regular season and conference tournament champion Division regular season champion Division regular season and conference tournament champion Conference tournament champion
