= Bolding (surname) =

Bolding is a surname, and may refer to:

- Buddy Bolding, American baseball coach
- Cees Bolding (1897–1979), Dutch painter
- Jim Bolding (1949–2011), American track and field athlete
- John Bolding (c.1824–1876), American enslaved and freed man
- Mark Bolding (born 1970), American ice hockey coach
- Morgan Bolding (born 1995), British rower
- Reginald Bolding, American politician
- Tysen Bolding, stage name Money Man (born 1986), American rapper

== See also ==
- Balding (surname)
