= Balding (surname) =

Balding is a surname. Notable people with the surname include:

- Adam Balding (born 1979), English rugby union player
- Al Balding (1924–2006), Canadian golfer
- Clare Balding (born 1971), BBC sports presenter and journalist
- David Balding, Australian statistician
- Gerald Balding (disambiguation), several people
- Ian Balding (1938–2026), American horse trainer
- Ivor G. Balding (1908–2005), British champion polo player
- Rebecca Balding (1955–2022), American actress
- Toby Balding (1936–2014), British racehorse trainer

== See also ==
- Baldinger, another surname
- Bolding (surname), another surname
