= Baldinger =

Baldinger is a surname. Notable people with the surname include:

- Brian Baldinger (born 1960), American football player
- Dirk Baldinger (born 1971), German racing cyclist
- Ernst Gottfried Baldinger (1738–1804), German physician
- Gary Baldinger (born 1963), American football player
- Kurt Baldinger (1919–2007), Swiss linguist and philologist
- Rich Baldinger (born 1959), American football player

== See also ==
- Balding (surname), another surname
