= 2018 Big South Conference baseball tournament =

- Teams: 8
- Format: Double-elimination
- Finals site: Liberty Baseball Stadium; Lynchburg, Virginia
- Champions: Campbell (4th title)
- Winning coach: Justin Haire (1st title)
- Television: Big South Network (Days 1, 3); ESPN+ (Day 2); ESPN3 (Day 4); ESPNU (Championship)

2018 Big South Conference baseball standings
	Conf.				Overall
Team	W		L	PCT	W		L	PCT
Campbell ‍‍‍	21	–	6	.778	31	–	23	.574
High Point ‍‍‍	19	–	8	.704	32	–	21	.604
Liberty ‍‍‍	17	–	10	.630	29	–	24	.547
Winthrop ‍‍‍	15	–	12	.556	24	–	29	.453
Gardner–Webb ‍‍‍	14	–	13	.519	29	–	25	.537
Radford ‍‍‍	14	–	13	.519	24	–	30	.444
Charleston Southern ‍‍‍	10	–	17	.370	19	–	34	.358
Longwood ‍‍‍	9	–	18	.333	17	–	36	.321
Presbyterian ‍‍‍	8	–	19	.296	15	–	39	.278
UNC Asheville ‍‍‍	8	–	19	.296	13	–	38	.255
‡ – Tournament champion As of May 22, 2018; Rankings from Collegiate Baseball

The 2018 Big South Conference baseball tournament was held from May 22 through 26. The top eight regular season finishers of the conference's ten teams met in the double-elimination tournament, which was held at Liberty Baseball Stadium in Lynchburg, Virginia. The tournament champion, Campbell, earned the conference's automatic bid to the 2018 NCAA Division I baseball tournament.

== Seeding and format ==
The top eight finishers of the league's ten teams qualified for the double-elimination tournament. Teams were seeded based on conference winning percentage, with the first tiebreaker being head-to-head record.

== Results ==
First round
1	Campbell	8
8	Longwood	1
4	Winthrop	5
5	Gardner Webb	7
8	Longwood	4
4	Winthrop	7
2	High Point	6 ^{11}
7	Charleston Southern	5
3	Liberty	1
6	Radford	4
7	Charleston Southern	2
3	Liberty	4

Second round
1	Campbell	8
5	Gardner-Webb	3
4	Winthrop	4
5	Gardner-Webb	5
2	High Point	6
6	Radford	3
3	Liberty	3^{10}
6	Radford	2

Semifinals
1	Campbell	5	6
3	Liberty	10	4
2	High Point	4	X
5	Gardner-Webb	1	X

Finals
1	Campbell	7
2	High Point	5
