= Longwood Lancers baseball =

Big South NCAA Division I baseball team

Longwood Lancers
- 2026 Longwood Lancers baseball team
- Founded: 1978
- University: Longwood University
- Head coach: Ray Noe (2nd season)
- Conference: Big South Conference
- Location: Farmville, Virginia
- Home stadium: Bolding Stadium (Capacity: 500)
- Nickname: Lancers
- Colors: Blue and white

College World Series appearances
- Division II: 1982

NCAA regional champions
- Division II: 1982

NCAA tournament appearances
- Division II: 1982, 1984, 1987, 1991, 1992, 1993

The Longwood Lancers baseball team represents Longwood University, which is located in Farmville, Virginia. The Lancers are an NCAA Division I college baseball program that competes in the Big South Conference. They began competing in Division I in 2005 and joined the Big South Conference in 2013 after 8 seasons as an independent.

The Longwood Lancers play all home games on campus at Buddy Bolding Stadium. The Lancers have played in 4 Big South Tournaments, reaching the semifinals in 2016 where they would lose to eventual Big South Conference and national champion Coastal Carolina.

Since the program's inception in 1978, one Lancer have gone on to play in Major League Baseball, outfielder Michael Tucker. Ten Lancers have been drafted, including Michael Tucker who was selected tenth overall in the 1992 Major League Baseball draft.

== Conference membership history (Division I only) ==
- 2005–2012: Independent
- 2013–present: Big South Conference

== Buddy Bolding Stadium ==
Buddy Bolding Stadium is a baseball stadium on the Longwood University campus in Farmville, Virginia that seats approximately 500 people. It was opened on March 12, 1994 with an 8–3 win over Davis & Elkins (WV).

== Head coaches (Division I only) ==
Records taken from the 2020 Longwood Year-by-Year Results

Season	Coach	Years	Record	Pct.
2005–2013	Buddy Bolding	9	231–213–1	.520
2014	Brian McCullough	1	22–33	.400
2015–2021	Ryan Mau	7	122–219	.358
2022–2024	Chad Oxendine	3	66–93	.415
Totals	4 coaches	20 seasons	420–513–1	.450

== Year-by-year NCAA Division I results ==
Records taken from the 2020 Longwood Year-by-Year Results

Statistics overview
Season	Coach	Overall	Conference	Standing	Postseason
Independent (2005–2012)
2005	Buddy Bolding	16–32			
2006	Buddy Bolding	23–27			
2007	Buddy Bolding	34–19			
2008	Buddy Bolding	23–26–1			
2009	Buddy Bolding	26–22			
2010	Buddy Bolding	28–20			
2011	Buddy Bolding	28–18			
2012	Buddy Bolding	27–21			
Big South Conference (2013–present)
2013	Buddy Bolding	26–28	12–12	7th	Big South Tournament
2014	Brian McCullough	22–33	9–18	T-10th	
2015	Ryan Mau	22–34	9–15	8th	Big South Tournament
2016	Ryan Mau	32–27	14–10	T-2nd	Big South Tournament
2017	Ryan Mau	19–34	7–17	10th	
2018	Ryan Mau	17–38	9–18	8th	Big South Tournament
2019	Ryan Mau	11–41	5–22	10th	
Total:		354–420–1			
National champion Postseason invitational champion Conference regular season champion Conference regular season and conference tournament champion Division regular season champion Division regular season and conference tournament champion Conference tournament champion

== Awards and honors (Division I only) ==
=== Big South First-Team All-Conference ===
Year	Position	Name
2013	3B	Alex Owens
2014	SP	Aaron Myers
2016	SP	Travis Burnette

Taken from the 2019 Longwood Baseball Stat Records - DI Awards. Updated March 11, 2020.

== Lancers in the Major Leagues ==
= All-Star	= Baseball Hall of Famer

Athlete	Years in MLB	MLB teams
Michael Tucker	1995–2006	Kansas City Royals, Atlanta Braves, Cincinnati Reds, Chicago Cubs, San Francisco Giants, Philadelphia Phillies, New York Mets

Taken from Baseball Reference. Updated March 11, 2020.

== See also ==
- List of NCAA Division I baseball programs
