= Gerald Balding =

Gerald Balding may refer to:

- Gerald Barnard Balding Sr. (1909–1957), British polo player
- Toby Balding (Gerald Barnard Balding Jr., 1936–2014), British racehorse trainer, his son
