= 2016 Big South Conference baseball tournament =

Baseball tournament

- Teams: 8
- Format: Double-elimination
- Finals site: Lexington County Baseball Stadium; Lexington, SC
- Champions: Coastal Carolina (14th title)

2016 Big South Conference baseball standings
	Conf.				Overall
Team	W		L	PCT	W		L	PCT
#1 Coastal Carolina †‡^{y} ‍‍‍	21	–	3	.875	53	–	17	.757
High Point ‍‍‍	14	–	10	.583	32	–	24	.571
Longwood ‍‍‍	14	–	10	.583	32	–	27	.542
Gardner–Webb ‍‍‍	14	–	10	.583	37	–	21	.638
Campbell* ‍‍‍	13	–	11	.542	26	–	27	.491
Presbyterian ‍‍‍	12	–	12	.500	27	–	30	.474
Liberty ‍‍‍	12	–	12	.500	31	–	28	.525
Winthrop ‍‍‍	12	–	12	.500	28	–	27	.509
Radford ‍‍‍	9	–	15	.375	19	–	39	.328
Charleston Southern ‍‍‍	6	–	18	.250	19	–	34	.358
UNC Asheville ‍‍‍	5	–	19	.208	16	–	38	.296
† – Conference champion ‡ – Tournament champion y – Invited to the NCAA tournament *Ineligible for postseason play due to APR penalties As of June 5, 2016; Rankings from Collegiate Baseball

The 2016 Big South Conference baseball tournament was held from May 24 through 28 of 2016. The top eight regular season finishers of the conference's twelve teams met in the double-elimination tournament to be held at Lexington County Baseball Stadium in Lexington, South Carolina. The tournament champion, Coastal Carolina, earned the conference's automatic bid to the 2016 NCAA Division I baseball tournament. Coastal Carolina went on to win the 2016 Men’s College World Series in Omaha, Nebraska.

== Seeding and format ==
The top eight finishers of the league's eleven teams qualify for the double-elimination tournament. Teams are seeded based on conference winning percentage, with the first tiebreaker being head-to-head record. Campbell is ineligible for postseason play due to APR penalties.

Team	W	L	Pct	GB	Seed
Coastal Carolina	21	3	.875	—	1
High Point	14	10	.583	7	2
Longwood	14	10	.583	7	3
Gardner–Webb	14	10	.583	7	4
Campbell	13	11	.542	8	—
Presbyterian	12	12	.500	9	5
Winthrop	12	12	.500	9	6
Liberty	12	12	.500	9	7
Radford	9	15	.375	9	8
Charleston Southern	6	18	.250	12	—
UNC Asheville	5	19	.208	13	—

== Results ==
First round
1	Coastal Carolina	7
8	Radford	5
4	Gardner–Webb	5
5	Presbyterian	3
5	Presbyterian	8
8	Radford	16
2	High Point	1
7	Liberty	6
3	Longwood	8
6	Winthrop	6
2	High Point	6
6	Winthrop	2

Second round
1	Coastal Carolina	4
4	Gardner–Webb	3
4	Gardner-Webb	4
8	Radford	8
3	Longwood	3
7	Liberty	9
3	Longwood	18
2	High Point	13

Semifinals
1	Coastal Carolina	5
3	Longwood	1
7	Liberty	11
3	Radford	10

Final
1	Coastal Carolina	1
7	Liberty	0
