= Andrew Beckwith =

American baseball player (born 1995)

- Pitcher
- Born: March 22, 1995 (age 31); Blythewood, South Carolina, U.S.
- Bats: Right Throws: Right
- Stats at Baseball Reference

Career highlights and awards
- College World Series Most Outstanding Player (2016)

Andrew Beckwith (born March 22, 1995) is an American former professional baseball pitcher.

== Career ==
Beckwith attended Blythewood High School in Blythewood, South Carolina, prior to enrolling at Coastal Carolina University. In 2016, he was named the Big South Conference Pitcher of the Year. In the 2016 College World Series, Beckwith started three games for Coastal Carolina, allowing two earned runs in 23 2/3 innings pitched. Beckwith was named the College World Series Most Outstanding Player, finishing his junior season with a 15–1 win–loss record and a 1.85 earned run average in 117 innings pitched. Beckwith returned to relief for the Chanticleers in his senior year.

The Kansas City Royals selected Beckwith in the 32nd round (960th overall) of the 2017 Major League Baseball draft. Beckwith signed with the Royals and spent the 2017 season with both the rookie–level Arizona League Royals and rookie–level Idaho Falls Chukars, posting a combined 1–0 record and 3.29 ERA in 16 games between both affiliates.

Beckwith began 2019 with the Double–A Northwest Arkansas Naturals. In July, the Royals demoted him to the High–A Wilmington Blue Rocks. In 35 games split between the Naturals and Wilmington, Beckwith posted a cumulative 4-0 record and 4.58 ERA with 45 strikeouts and two saves in 53 innings pitched. On March 3, 2020, Beckwith retired from professional baseball.
