= John Bolding =

American slave

John A. Bolding
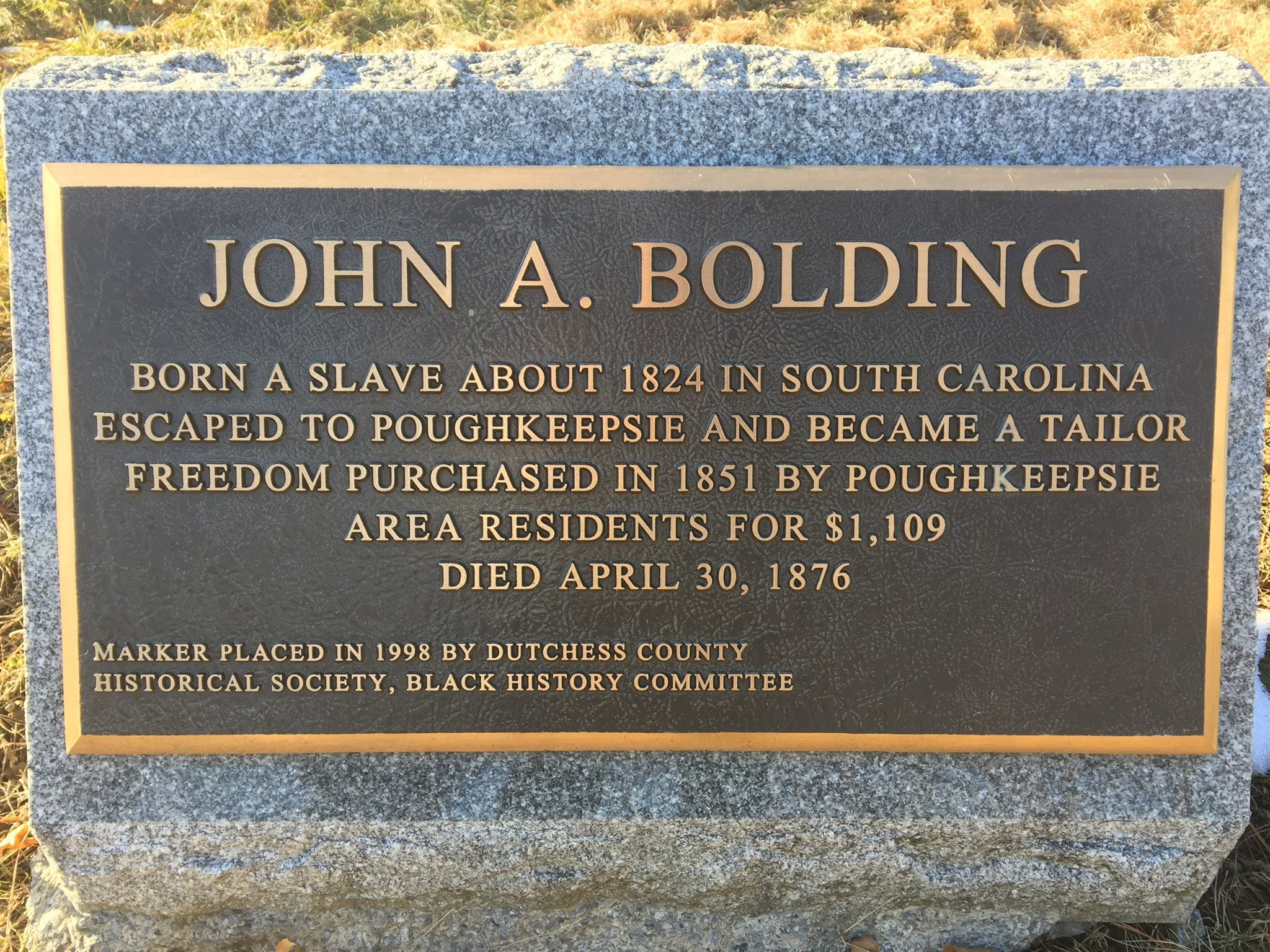
- Bronze memorial stone marking the grave of John A. Bolding in Poughkeepsie Rural Cemetery.
- Born: Approximately 1824; South Carolina
- Died: April 30, 1876 (aged 51–52); Poughkeepsie, New York (if accurate)
- Resting place: Poughkeepsie Rural Cemetery
- Occupation: Tailor
- Known for: Escape from slavery, establishing a successful tailoring business, activism against slavery
- Spouse(s): Henrietta; Nellie

John A. Bolding (approximately 1824 – April 30, 1876) was an affluent black tailor and former slave who became an influential figure in Poughkeepsie, New York.

== Early life ==
Bolding was born into slavery in approximately 1824 in South Carolina. With the aid of the Underground Railroad, he arrived in Poughkeepsie, New York, around 1840, where he began working as a tailor at 4 Liberty Street alongside fellow black tailor Francis J. Moore. His skills and work ethic earned him a reputation in the town, and locals patronized his shop for their tailoring needs.

== Marriage and abduction ==
In 1851, Bolding married a woman named Henrietta and intended to start a family. However, he was recognized by a fellow South Carolinian woman who informed his owner, Barnet Anderson, leading to Bolding's arrest. U.S. Marshal Benjamin Tallmadge, a local, promptly seized Bolding. According the New York Herald, news of John Bolding's abduction spread rapidly. A group of black protesters trying to rescue Bolding, raced to intercept him and Tallmadge at the train station but arrived too late. Bolding had been swiftly moved to a prisoner compartment on a train destined for New York City to await his trial.

The court ruled that Bolding was indeed a slave, and he was returned to Anderson's custody.

== Community response ==
As outlined in a journal kept by John S. Grubb; at least 178 individual citizens and families of Poughkeepsie, outraged by Bolding's arrest, raised funds to secure his release. A committee was formed, and the locals raised over $1,000, with additional funds coming from Albany and New York City. Within a week, Anderson's demands were met, and John Bolding returned to Poughkeepsie as a free man.

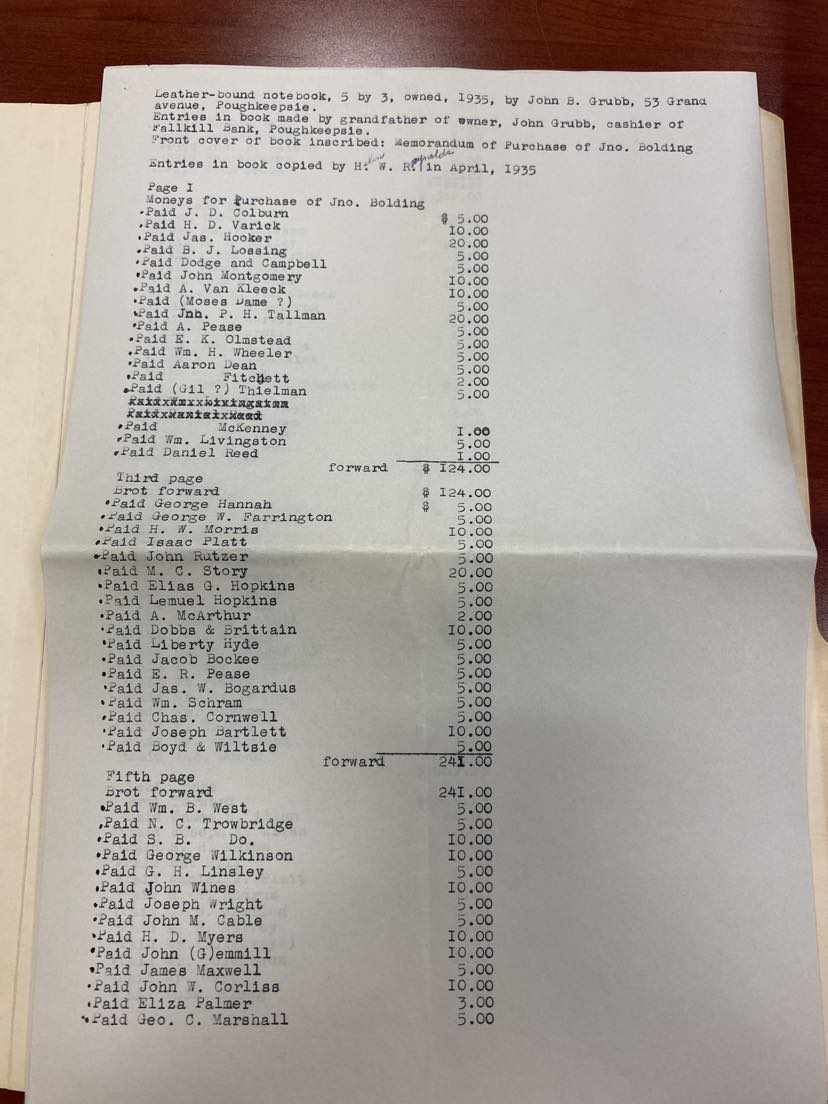

== Later life ==
According to notes taken from Grubb's notebook, John Bolding remarried a woman named Nellie at some point. Bolding continued to work as a tailor until his death on April 30, 1876, at the age of 52. Mrs. Nellie Bolding lived at 129 Pine Street until at least 1883, when she was last mentioned as having moved to 8 North Bridge Street.

Bolding died on April 30, 1876 and was buried in the Poughkeespie Rural Cemetery, in a plot for which he paid $11.25. Although he paid for his own burial plot, his grave was unmarked, a common practice at the time.

== Legacy ==
Citizens of Poughkeepsie memorialized his life and odyssey with a bronze memorial, unveiled on May 16, 1998.
