= 2015 Big South Conference baseball tournament =

- Teams: 8
- Format: Double-elimination
- Finals site: John Henry Moss Stadium; Boiling Springs, NC
- Champions: Radford (1st title)

2015 Big South Conference baseball standings
	Conf.				Overall
Team	W		L	PCT	W		L	PCT
Radford ‍‍‍	20	–	4	.833	39	–	14	.736
Coastal Carolina ‍‍‍	17	–	7	.708	35	–	18	.660
Winthrop ‍‍‍	16	–	8	.667	38	–	17	.691
Liberty ‍‍‍	16	–	8	.667	33	–	21	.611
High Point ‍‍‍	14	–	10	.583	27	–	24	.529
Campbell ‍‍‍	12	–	12	.500	31	–	23	.574
Charleston Southern ‍‍‍	10	–	14	.417	23	–	28	.451
Longwood ‍‍‍	9	–	15	.375	21	–	32	.396
Gardner–Webb ‍‍‍	7	–	17	.292	22	–	31	.415
Presbyterian ‍‍‍	6	–	18	.250	27	–	28	.491
UNC Asheville ‍‍‍	5	–	19	.208	21	–	34	.382
‡ – Tournament champion As of May 17, 2015; Rankings from Collegiate Baseball

The 2015 Big South Conference baseball tournament was held from May 19 through 23. The top eight regular season finishers of the conference's twelve teams met in the double-elimination tournament held at John Henry Moss Stadium on the campus of Gardner–Webb University in Boiling Springs, North Carolina. The tournament champion earned the conference's automatic bid to the 2015 NCAA Division I baseball tournament.

== Seeding and format ==
The top eight finishers of the league's eleven teams qualify for the double-elimination tournament. Teams are seeded based on conference winning percentage, with the first tiebreaker being head-to-head record.

Team	W	L	Pct.	GB	Seed	Tiebreaker
Radford	20	4	.833	–	1	
Coastal Carolina	17	7	.708	3	2	
Winthrop	16	8	.667	4	3	3–0 vs. Longwood
Liberty	16	8	.667	4	4	2–1 vs. Longwood
High Point	14	10	.583	6	5	
Campbell	12	12	.500	8	6	
Charleston Southern	10	14	.417	10	7	
Longwood	9	15	.375	11	8	
Gardner–Webb	7	17	.292	13	–	
Presbyterian	6	18	.250	14	–	
UNC Asheville	5	19	.208	15	–	

== Bracket ==
First round
1	Radford	5
8	Longwood	3
4	Liberty	3
5	High Point	8
8	Longwood	4
4	Liberty	3
3	Winthrop	8
6	Campbell	5
2	Coastal Carolina	10
7	Charleston Southern	0
6	Campbell	8
7	Charleston Southern	1

Second round
1	Radford	4
5	High Point	0
8	Longwood	0
5	High Point	1
3	Winthrop	0
2	Coastal Carolina	8
6	Campbell	1
3	Winthrop	2

Semifinals
1	Radford	4	–
3	Winthrop	2	–
2	Coastal Carolina	9	–
5	High Point	3	–

Final
1	Radford	5
2	Coastal Carolina	4
