= Buddy Bolding =

American baseball player and coach

Current position
- Record: 953–544–4 (.640) (35 seasons)

Biographical details
- Born: Norfolk, Virginia

Coaching career (HC unless noted)
- 1978–2013: Longwood

Accomplishments and honors

Awards
- 2 NCAA Division II South Atlantic Region Coach of the Year (1982, 1991); 4 Virginia College Division Coach of the Year 1984, 1991, 1993, 1997; 7 Longwood Male Coach of the Year. Milligan University Athletics Hall Of Fame 2012. Salem-Roanoke Baseball Hall Of Fame 2017. Longwood University Athletics Hall Of Fame 2018. Staunton River High School Athletics Hall Of Fame 2019. Virginia Baseball Coaches Association Hall Of Fame 2023.

Buddy Bolding is a former American coach of the Longwood Lancers baseball team, a member of the NCAA Division I Big South Conference. Longwood's home baseball venue, Bolding Stadium, is named after him.

== Playing career ==
Bolding played college baseball under Sam Holt and Bobby Wilson at Carson–Newman College in Tennessee. After serving as a United States Army Combat Medic in Vietnam, he played in the minor leagues for the Twins. He also ran Track & Field at Milligan College for renowned Tennessee Sports Hall of Fame coach Duard B. Walker. Milligan College inducted Bolding into its Athletics Hall of Fame for his multi-event Track and Field exploits while a Buffalo, where he set school records in the 440, pole vault, discus, and javelin. His 1972 47.6 second 440 time at the Davidson Relays still stands.

== Coaching career ==
Bolding was the head coach of Longwood from 1978 until his retirement in 2013. During his tenure, the team moved from Division III to Division II (in 1981) and again to Division I in 2005. Noted to be men of high character and purpose, many of Bolding's players have gone on to high achievement after their playing days: He produced Longwood University's first and only Olympic athlete when future major league outfielder, Michael Tucker, hit clean-up for Team U.S.A in Barcelona (1992). Also, Scott Abell, Head Football Coach at Rice University, is a Bolding product. His coaching tree is broad, including former Lancer pitchers, Steve Gedro (who was major leaguer David Wright's H.S. coach), and Mickey Roberts (who was major leaguer Jackie Bradley's H.S. coach). The 35 year Longwood skipper also coached the nephew of former undefeated Heavyweight boxing Champion Of The World, Rocky Marciano. Additionally, the Old-School coach's former players have distinguished themselves in many professions (law enforcement; medicine; law; business; education; clergy) outside of sports: Marine Corps Colonel, Patrick Richardson, flew Marine One for President Barack Obama, after winning combat decorations for flying attack helicopter gun-ships in Afghanistan. Bolding published his memoir "Top Half, get on base dammit!" in 2014. The 630 page book is a colorful and intensely personal narrative of his formative years, personal life, his Vietnam War service, and his subsequent highly successful 40 year coaching career. A critical review labeled this book of the legendary coach a poignant and "hard-hitting" American success story.

=== Longwood University ===
Longwood had winning records in 31 of Bolding's 35 seasons. His career coaching record is 953–544–4.

Longwood appeared six times in the NCAA Division II Tournament and made two trips to the Division II College World Series under Bolding. In 1982, Longwood reached the national championship with a 31–10–1 overall record. In 1991, the team won a program-record 41 games and advanced to the Division II College World Series. In Division I play in 2007, 2009, 2010, 2011, and 2012, the team finished with an above-.500 record, with records of 34–19, 26–22, 28–20, 28–18, and 27–21, respectively. His final Longwood team finished in the final four of the 2013 Big South Conference tournament.

In 2009, the Longwood Board of Visitors renamed the university's baseball complex in honor of Bolding, and established the Charles B. and Andrea G. Bolding scholarship in his and his wife's name.

Prior to the start of the 2013 season, Longwood announced that Bolding would retire following the season.

=== Staunton River High School ===
Bolding graduated from Staunton River High School in Moneta, Virginia, where he played football and baseball, and also excelled in track & field. In 1965, he was named Bedford County's Athlete of the Year. Bolding later coached his high school's varsity teams to championships in cross country and baseball before moving to the college coaching ranks. Bolding was inducted into Staunton River High School's Athletic Hall Of Fame in 2019 where he excelled first as a multi-sport athlete, and later as a Championship-winning coach.
