= Bolding Stadium =

Baseball venue in Farmville, Virginia, U.S.

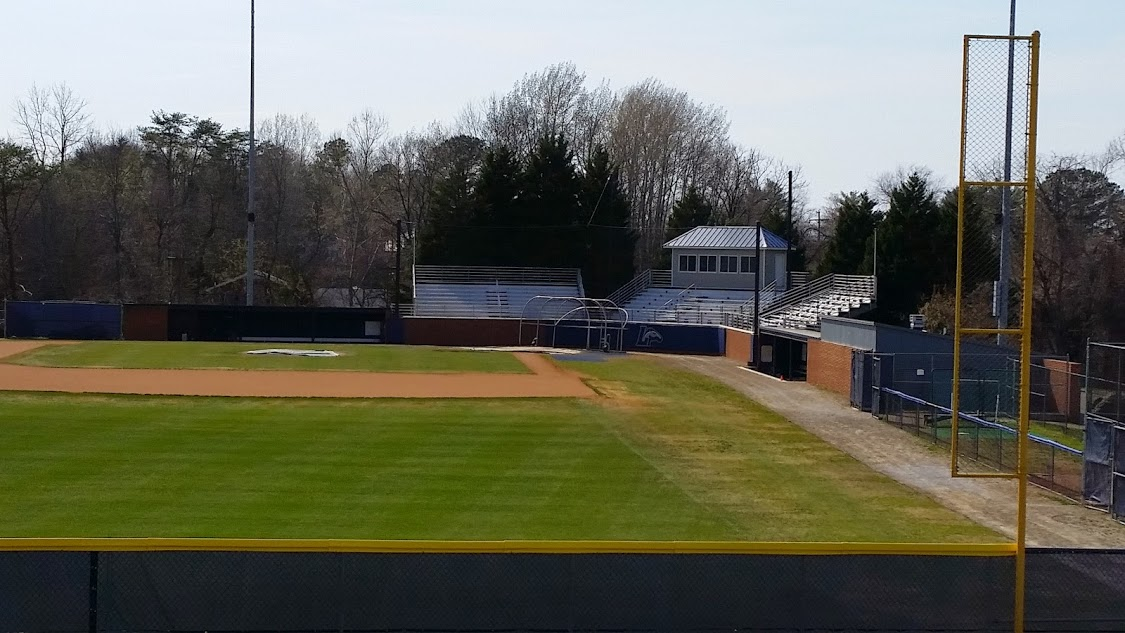
- Interactive map of Bolding Stadium
- Full name: Charles "Buddy" Bolding Stadium
- Former names: Lancer Stadium (1994–2009)
- Location: Race Street south of Franklin Street, Farmville, Virginia, USA
- Coordinates: 37.293989°N 78.396745°W
- Owner: Longwood University
- Operator: Longwood University
- Capacity: 500
- Surface: Natural grass
- Scoreboard: Electronic
- Field size: 335 feet (Left field); 375 feet (LCF); 400 feet (Center field); 375 feet (RCF); 335 feet (Right field)

Construction
- Built: 1993
- Opened: March 12, 1994
- Renovated: 2007, 2008

Tenant
- Longwood Lancers baseball (NCAA D1 Big South) (1994–present)

Charles "Buddy" Bolding Stadium is a baseball stadium in Farmville, Virginia, United States. It is home to the Longwood Lancers baseball team, a member of the Big South Conference. Opened in 1994, the venue has a capacity of 500. It is named for Buddy Bolding, who was the first head coach of the Lancers' baseball team, who served for 35 seasons from 1978 until his retirement after the 2013 season.

Features of the stadium include a recessed dugouts, a press box, batting cages, and irrigation.

== History ==
Construction completed in 1993 and the stadium was dedicated October 5 of that year. The facility's first game, March 12, 1994, saw Longwood best Davis & Elkins College 8-3. In 1996 and 1997, the stadium hosted the Carolinas-Virginia Athletic Conference Baseball Tournament.

The stadium, known as Lancers Stadium from its 1994 opening until 2009, was renamed Charles "Buddy" Bolding Stadium in October 2009.

=== Renovations ===
In 2007, the university added stadium lighting and a new drainage system and in 2008, it constructed a new team clubhouse.

== Naming ==
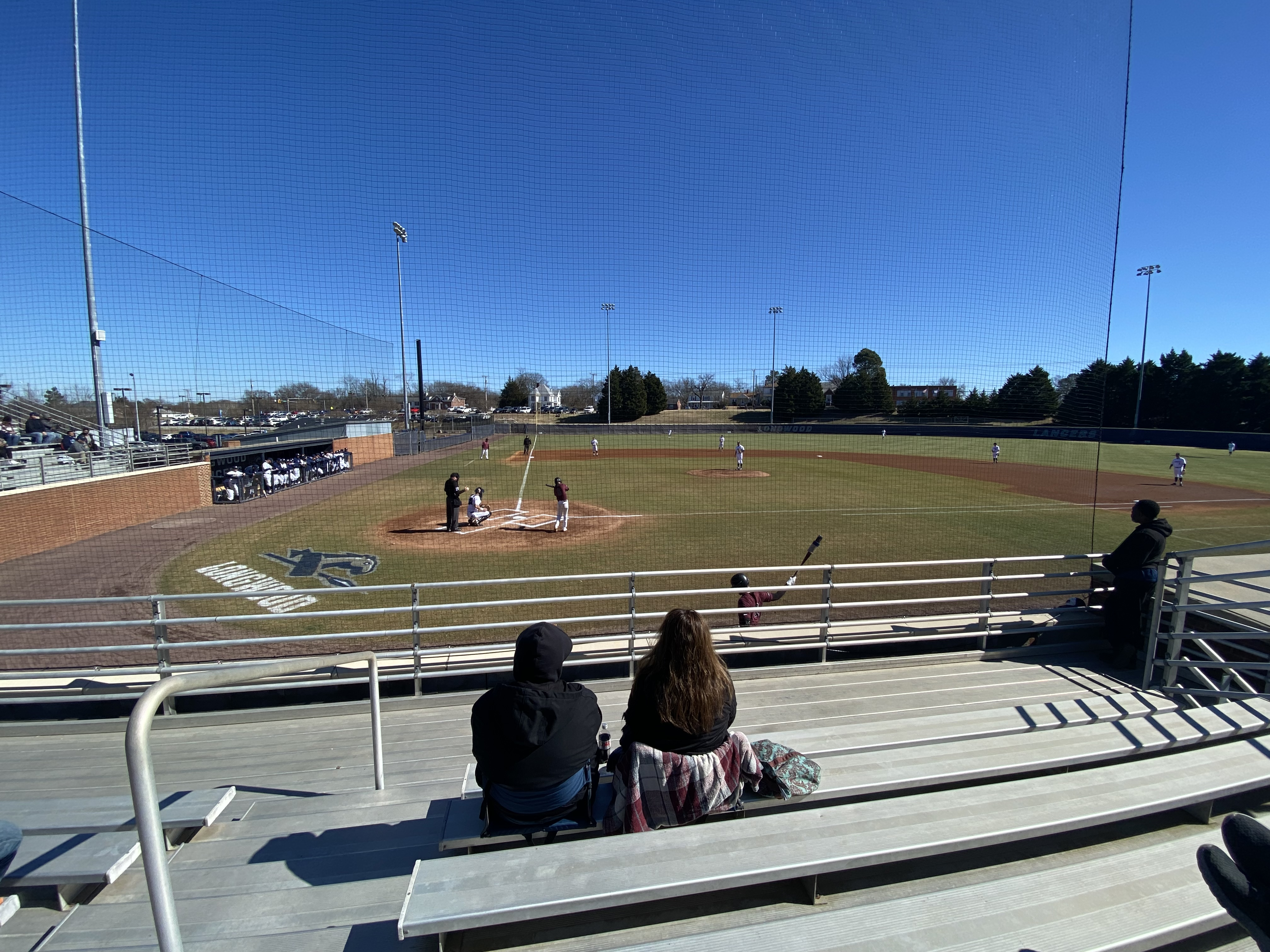
The stadium during a game in February 2022

The stadium is named for Charles "Buddy" Bolding, Longwood's head baseball coach from 1978 through 2013. The field was dedicated to Bolding, October 3, 2009. During Bolding's tenure the Lancers have qualified for six NCAA Division II baseball tournaments and reached the Division II College World Series twice (1982, 1991).

== Replacement ==
The Longwood University master plan states that by 2025 Bolding Stadium should be replaced with a new park north of campus, adjacent to High Bridge Trail State Park. The stadium is also planned to be used by a Minor League Baseball affiliate.

== See also ==
- List of NCAA Division I baseball venues
