= Liberty Baseball Stadium =

Baseball venue in Lynchburg, Virginia

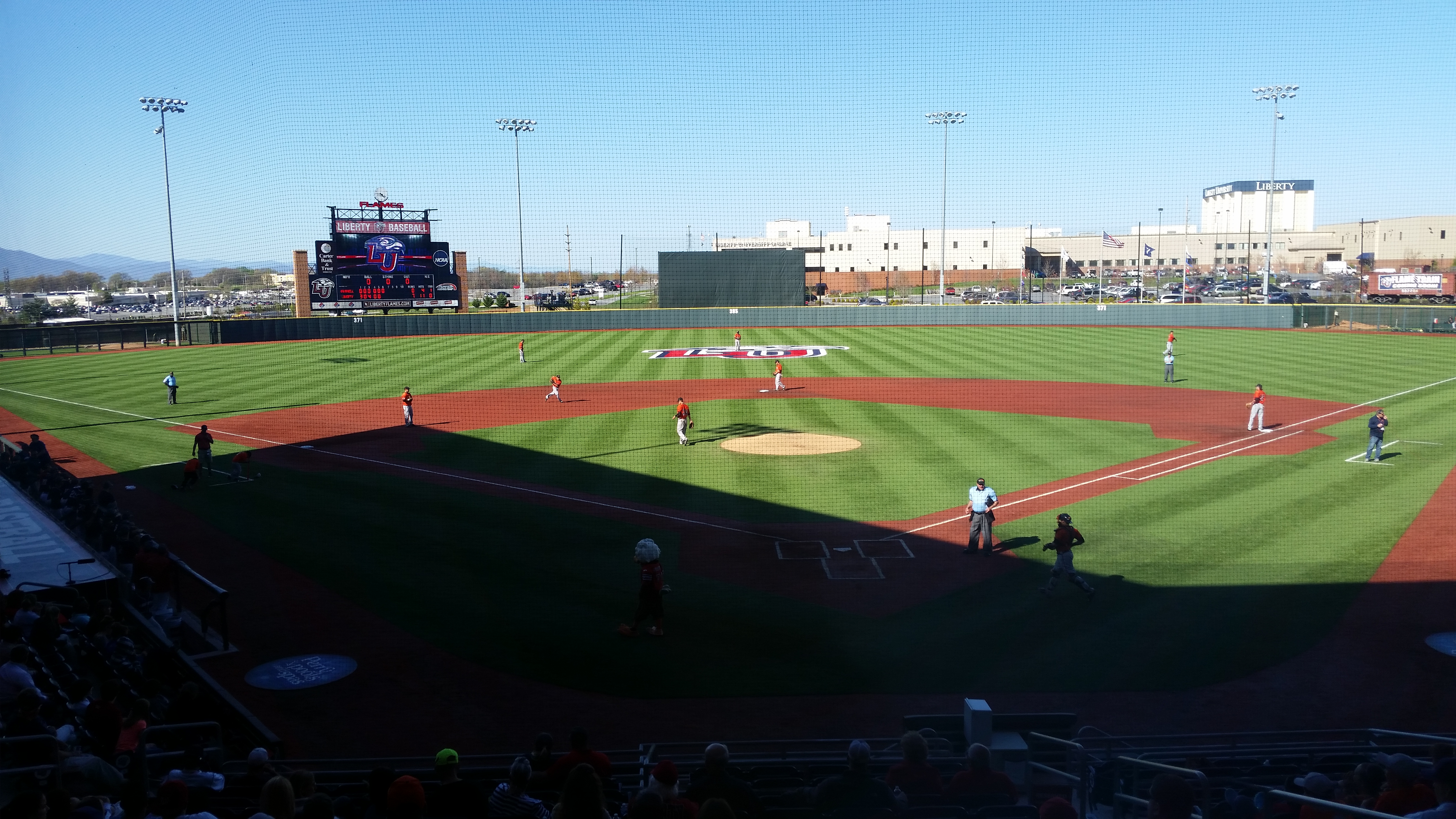
- Liberty Baseball Stadium in 2015
- Interactive map of Liberty Baseball Stadium
- Location: Campus of Liberty University, Lynchburg, Virginia, United States
- Coordinates: 37.356456°N 79.177507°W
- Owner: Liberty University
- Operator: Liberty University
- Capacity: 2,500
- Executive suites: 3
- Surface: AstroTurf
- Scoreboard: Electronic with video board
- Record attendance: 3,983 (April 10, 2015 vs. Campbell University)
- Field size: Left Field: 325 ft (99 m); Center Field: 390 ft (120 m); Right Field: 325 ft (99 m)

Construction
- Built: 2012–2013
- Opened: February 23, 2013
- Cost: $9 million+

Tenants
- Liberty Flames baseball (NCAA DI CUSA) (2013–present)

Website
- Liberty Baseball Stadium

Liberty Baseball Stadium is a baseball venue in Lynchburg, Virginia. It is the home field of the Liberty Flames baseball team, a member of the NCAA Division I Conference USA. The stadium opened in February 2013 and has a capacity of 2,500 spectators. It hosted the 2013 Big South Tournament.

== History ==
In August 2011, Liberty University announced plans for a new baseball venue, which would be built next to Williams Stadium, the school's football venue. The venue was planned to replace Al Worthington Stadium, the Liberty baseball program's home field since the 1979 season. When the venue was initially announced, it was planned to have a capacity of roughly 3,000 spectators and construction costs of roughly $5 million. Construction on the venue began in 2012. It was completed in February 2013, immediately before the start of the 2013 season, with a capacity of 2,500 spectators and construction costs of more than $9 million.

The stadium's first game was played on February 23, 2013. Liberty defeated Penn State, 4-1, and a then stadium-record 2,565 spectators attended the game. Liberty won its first seven games in the venue, with the team's first loss coming against William & Mary on March 5. Liberty's regular season home record in 2013 was 20-9.

The new ballpark was rededicated as Worthington Field at Liberty Baseball Stadium in 2019.

== Features ==
The stadium features an AstroTurf field. Its capacity of 2,500 spectators consists of chairback seats, berm seating, and standing room. It has a press box, three private suites, a concourse, concession stands, and an electronic scoreboard and video board. Practice areas and player lounges were also built with the stadium.

== Events ==
The stadium hosted the 2013 Big South Tournament May 21–25. Liberty, the fifth seed, won the tournament. Liberty was the first host school to win the Big South Tournament since 1992.

== Attendance ==
Total Attendance- Regular Season
Season	Dates	Attendance	Average	Home Record	Pct
2023	25	32,204	1,288	15-10	.600
2022	28	35,4620	1,266	20-8	.714
2021*	26	12,980	497	24-2	.923
2020*	12	17,225	1,425	10-2	.833
2019	27	37,432	1,386	25-5	.833
2018	23	40,461	1,759	18-8	.692
2017	25	31,232	1,249	15-11	.577
2016	28	44,584	1,592	18-11	.620
2015	29	39,334	1,356	21-9	.700
2014	25	33,145	1,441	22-5	.815
2013	25	29,425	1,177	20-8	.714

*Attendance impacted by COVID-19 restrictions

== See also ==
- List of NCAA Division I baseball venues
