= Liberty Flames baseball =

- 2026 Liberty Flames baseball team
- Founded: 1974
- University: Liberty University
- Head coach: Bradley LeCroy (2nd season)
- Conference: C-USA
- Location: Lynchburg, Virginia
- Home stadium: Liberty Baseball Stadium (capacity: 2,500)
- Nickname: Flames
- Colors: Red, white, and blue

NCAA tournament appearances
- 1993, 1998, 2000, 2013, 2014, 2019, 2021, 2022, 2026

Conference tournament champions
- Big South: 2013; Atlantic Sun: 2019

Conference regular season champions
- Atlantic Sun: 2021

The Liberty Flames baseball team is a varsity intercollegiate athletic team of Liberty University in Lynchburg, Virginia, United States. The team is a member of Conference USA, which is part of the National Collegiate Athletic Association's Division I. Liberty's first baseball team was fielded in 1974. The team plays its home games at Liberty Baseball Stadium in Lynchburg, Virginia. The Flames are coached by Bradley LeCroy. The team colors are red, white and blue.

== Liberty in the NCAA Tournament ==
Year	Record	Pct	Notes
1993	0–2	.000	Atlantic Regional
1998	0–2	.000	Atlantic II Regional
2000	1–2	.333	Columbia Regional
2013	2–2	.500	Columbia Regional
2014	0–2	.000	Charlottesville Regional
2019	1–2	.333	Chapel Hill Regional
2021	2–2	.500	Knoxville Regional
2022	0–2	.000	Gainesville Regional
2026	2–2	.500	Athens Regional
TOTALS	8–18	.308	

== Year-by-year results ==
Record table
Season	Coach	Overall	Conference	Standing	Postseason
NAIA Independent (1974–1983)
D1 Independent (1984–1991)
1984	Al Worthington	23-19			
1985	Al Worthington	25-17			
1986	Al Worthington	26-14			
Al Worthington:		343-189-1			
1987	Bobby Richardson	12-26			
1988	Bobby Richardson	18-32			
1989	Bobby Richardson	25-24			
1990	Bobby Richardson	23-24-1			
Bobby Richardson:		78-106-1			
1991	Johnny Hunton	32-14-1			
Big South Conference (1992–2018)
1992	Johnny Hunton	20-27-1	5-11-1		
1993	Johnny Hunton	23-25	10-11		NCAA Regional
1994	Johnny Hunton	21-30-1	9-18		
1995	Johnny Hunton	33-20	15-9		
1996	Johnny Hunton	21-27	8-13		
1997	Johnny Hunton	25-32	11-10		
Johnny Hunton:		175-175-3	58-72		
1998	Dave Pastors	32-29	13-5		NCAA Regional
1999	Dave Pastors	26-28	7-8		
2000	Dave Pastors	36-23	14-5	1st	NCAA Regional
2001	Dave Pastors	35-21	13-7		
2002	Dave Pastors	33-24-2	11-9		
Dave Pastors:		162-125-2	58-34		
2003	Matt Royer	17-37	7-12		
2004	Matt Royer	25-30	9-15		
2005	Matt Royer	36-19	14-10		
2006	Matt Royer	39–21	13–11		
2007	Matt Royer	36–25	14–7		
Matt Royer:		153-132	57-55		
2008	Jim Toman	35–26–1	14–7		
2009	Jim Toman	33–21	17–9		
2010	Jim Toman	42–19	19–8		
2011	Jim Toman	35–24	18–9		
2012	Jim Toman	41–19	14–10		
2013	Jim Toman	36–29	13–10		NCAA Regional
2014	Jim Toman	41–18	23–3	1st (North)	NCAA Regional
2015	Jim Toman	33–23	16–8		
2016	Jim Toman	31–28	12–12		
Jim Toman:		329-205-1	100-76		
2017	Scott Jackson	32–23	16–8	2nd	
2018	Scott Jackson	32–26	17–10	3rd	
Big South:		830-672-6	306-255		
ASUN Conference (2019–2023)
2019	Scott Jackson	40–19	15–9		NCAA Regional
2020	Scott Jackson	10–7			Season canceled on March 12 due to COVID-19
2021	Scott Jackson	41–16	19–2	1st (North)	NCAA Regional
2022	Scott Jackson	37–23	19–12	1st (East)	NCAA Regional
2023	Scott Jackson	27–31	16–14	6th	
ASUN:		155–68	69–37		
Conference USA (2024–present)
2024	Scott Jackson	24-34	11-13	5th	
Scott Jackson:		246–181	80-49		
2025	Bradley LeCroy				
Total:		1,156–949			
National champion Postseason invitational champion Conference regular season champion Conference regular season and conference tournament champion Division regular season champion Division regular season and conference tournament champion Conference tournament champion

== Major League Baseball ==
As of the 2022 Major League Baseball season, 79 former Flames have been drafted by MLB teams. Nine players have made it to the majors: Sid Bream, Randy Tomlin, Doug Brady, Lee Guetterman, Josh Rupe, Ian Parmley, Ryan Cordell, Fraser Ellard, and Will Wagner. Additionally, Tony Beasley, a former infielder with the Flames, served as the interim manager of the Texas Rangers during the 2022 season.

== See also ==
- List of NCAA Division I baseball programs
