= 2022 Texas State Bobcats baseball team =

College Baseball Season

2022 Texas State Bobcats baseball

Sun Belt regular season champions

Stanford Regional, 2–2
- Conference: Sun Belt Conference

Ranking
- Coaches: No. 14
- CB: No. 11
- Record: 47–14 (26–4 SBC)
- Head coach: Steven Trout (3rd season)
- Assistant coaches: Josh Blakley; Chad Massengale
- Home stadium: Bobcat Ballpark

2022 Sun Belt Conference baseball standings
	Conf.						Overall
Team	W		L		T	PCT	W		L		T	PCT
No. 13 Texas State ‍†‍‍^{y}	26	–	4	–	0	.867	47	–	14	–	0	.770
No. 21 Georgia Southern ‍‍‍^{y}	23	–	7	–	0	.767	41	–	20	–	0	.672
Coastal Carolina ‍‍‍^{y}	21	–	8	–	1	.717	39	–	20	–	1	.658
Louisiana ‍‍‡‍^{y}	19	–	11	–	0	.633	37	–	23	–	0	.617
South Alabama ‍‍‍	17	–	13	–	0	.567	31	–	23	–	0	.574
Troy ‍‍‍	15	–	15	–	0	.500	32	–	24	–	0	.571
Georgia State ‍‍‍	15	–	15	–	0	.500	30	–	27	–	0	.526
Little Rock ‍‍‍	11	–	18	–	0	.379	24	–	27	–	0	.471
Appalachian State ‍‍‍	10	–	20	–	0	.333	20	–	33	–	0	.377
Louisiana–Monroe ‍‍‍	9	–	20	–	1	.317	20	–	35	–	1	.366
UT Arlington ‍‍‍	7	–	23	–	0	.233	15	–	39	–	0	.278
Arkansas State ‍‍‍	5	–	24	–	0	.172	11	–	38	–	0	.224
† – Conference champion ‡ – Tournament champion y – Invited to the NCAA tournament Rankings from D1Baseball

The 2022 Texas State Bobcats baseball team represented Texas State University during the 2022 NCAA Division I baseball season. The Bobcats played their home games at Bobcat Ballpark and were led by third-year head coach Steven Trout. They were members of the Sun Belt Conference.

== Preseason ==
=== Signing Day Recruits ===
Player	Hometown	Previous Team
Pitchers
Colby Diaz	Leander, Texas	Rouse HS
Adrian Najar	Grand Prairie, Texas	South Grand Prairie HS
Brian Panneton	Tomball, Texas	Tomball Memorial HS
Sam Peterson	Lindale, Texas	Lindale HS
Jack Stroud	Amarillo, Texas	Weatherford
Mark Zapata	Pearland, Texas	Pearland HS
Hitters
Collin Coker	Sweeny, Texas	Sweeny HS
Rashawn Galloway	Boerne, Texas	Boerne HS
Coldon Kiser	Lubbock, Texas	Frenship HS
Davis Powell	Lufkin, Texas	Lufkin HS
Kameron Weil	Arlington, Texas	Weatherford

=== Sun Belt Conference Coaches Poll ===
The Sun Belt Conference Coaches Poll was released on February 9, 2022. Texas State was picked to finish seventh with 71 votes.

Coaches poll
Predicted finish	Team	Votes (1st place)
1	South Alabama	139 (7)
2	Georgia Southern	118
T3	Coastal Carolina	117 (3)
T3	Louisiana	117 (2)
5	UT Arlington	78
6	Troy	74
7	Texas State	71
8	Little Rock	63
9	Louisiana–Monroe	59
10	Appalachian State	38
11	Georgia State	34
12	Arkansas State	28

=== Preseason All-Sun Belt Team & Honors ===
No players were chosen from the Bobcats.

== Personnel ==
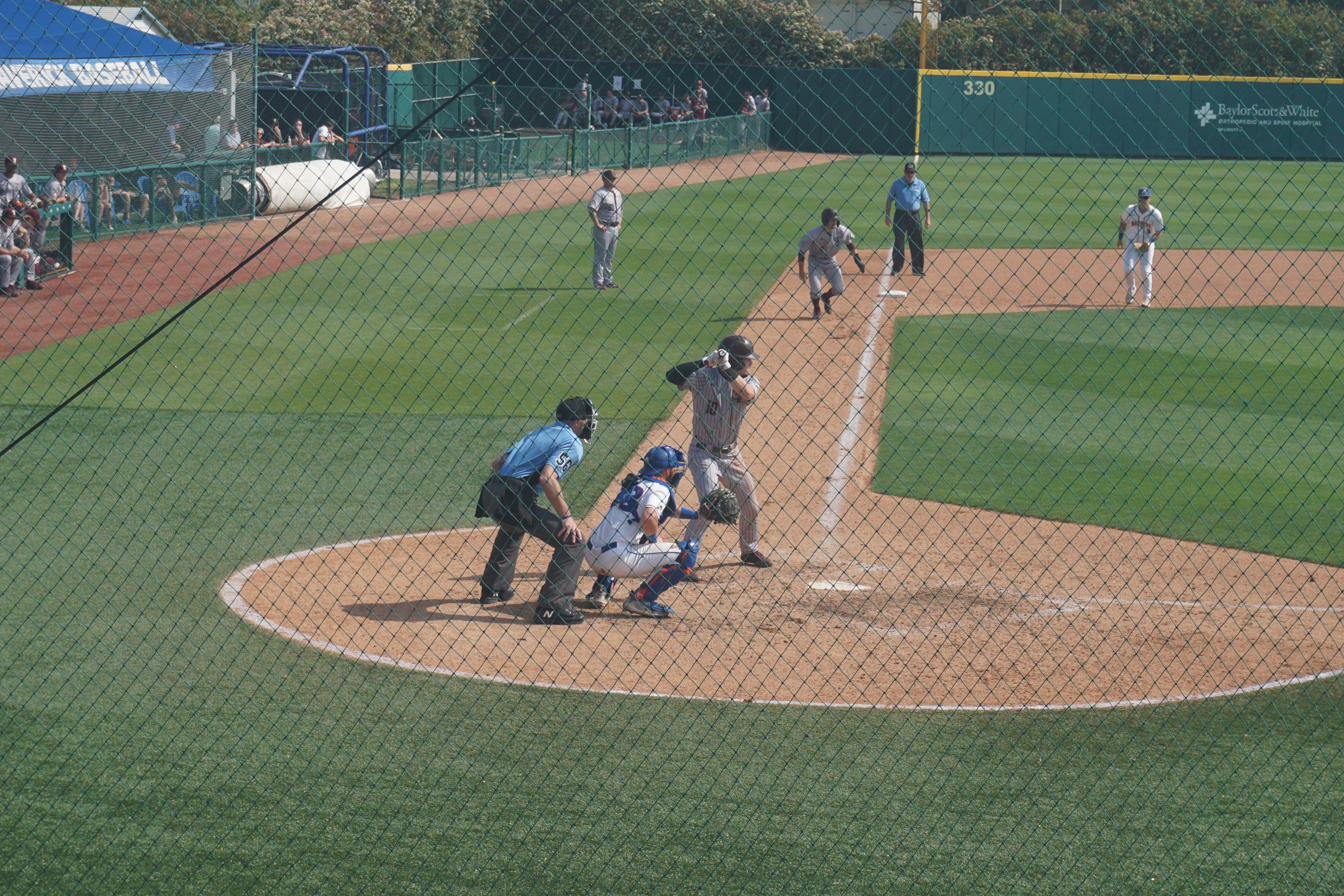
Texas State in action at UT Arlington

2022 Texas State Bobcats baseball team
Players
Coaches

#	Pos.	Name	B/T	Height	Weight	Year	Home town
1	LHP	Carson Keithley (redshirt)	L/L	6 ft 0 in (1.83 m)	174 lb (79 kg)	Fr	Alvin, Texas
2	RHP	Triston Dixon	R/R	6 ft 0 in (1.83 m)	183 lb (83 kg)	Jr	Conroe, Texas
3	RHP	Trevis Sundgren	R/R	6 ft 0 in (1.83 m)	184 lb (83 kg)	Sr	Silsbee, Texas
4	OF	Ben McClain (redshirt)	L/L	5 ft 10 in (1.78 m)	207 lb (94 kg)	Jr	Pearland, Texas
6	OF	Kyle Atkinson	L/L	6 ft 0 in (1.83 m)	177 lb (80 kg)	Fr	New Boston, Texas
7	OF	John Wuthrich	R/R	6 ft 1 in (1.85 m)	197 lb (89 kg)	Sr	Midland, Texas
8	INF	Dalton Shuffield	R/R	5 ft 9 in (1.75 m)	170 lb (77 kg)	Sr	San Antonio, Texas
9	INF	Cade Manning	L/R	6 ft 1 in (1.85 m)	207 lb (94 kg)	So	Southlake, Texas
10	INF	Justin Thompson	R/R	6 ft 1 in (1.85 m)	188 lb (85 kg)	Sr	Frisco, Texas
11	INF	Cameron Gibbons	R/R	6 ft 2 in (1.88 m)	175 lb (79 kg)	Sr	Houston, Texas
12	INF	Ryan Leary	R/R	6 ft 0 in (1.83 m)	194 lb (88 kg)	Fr	Liberty Hill, Texas
13	RHP	Tristan Stivors	R/R	6 ft 4 in (1.93 m)	220 lb (100 kg)	Sr	Castroville, Texas
14	RHP	Hayden Vanderroest	R/R	6 ft 0 in (1.83 m)	202 lb (92 kg)	So	Shallowater, Texas
15	LHP	Austin Smith (redshirt)	L/L	5 ft 11 in (1.8 m)	197 lb (89 kg)	Jr	Abilene, Texas
16	INF	Daylan Pena	R/R	6 ft 0 in (1.83 m)	205 lb (93 kg)	Fr	Corpus Christi, Texas
17	OF	Isaiah Ortega-Jones	R/R	5 ft 11 in (1.8 m)	188 lb (85 kg)	Sr	Fort Worth, Texas
18	C	August Ramirez (redshirt)	L/R	5 ft 9 in (1.75 m)	207 lb (94 kg)	So	Helotes, Texas
19	RHP	Dylan Kerbow	L/R	6 ft 0 in (1.83 m)	187 lb (85 kg)	Fr	The Woodlands, Texas
20	RHP	Reece Gould	R/R	6 ft 4 in (1.93 m)	207 lb (94 kg)	Jr	Hurst, Texas
21	C	Peyton Lewis	L/R	6 ft 2 in (1.88 m)	199 lb (90 kg)	Jr	Cypress, Texas
23	INF	Jose Gonzalez	L/L	6 ft 0 in (1.83 m)	215 lb (98 kg)	Jr	Spring, Texas
24	INF	Wesley Faison	R/R	6 ft 4 in (1.93 m)	236 lb (107 kg)	Sr	Richmond, Texas
25	RHP	Levi Wells	R/R	6 ft 0 in (1.83 m)	191 lb (87 kg)	So	La Porte, Texas
27	RHP	Otto Wofford	R/R	6 ft 2 in (1.88 m)	166 lb (75 kg)	So	Mason, Texas
28	RHP	Matthew Nicholas (redshirt)	R/R	6 ft 0 in (1.83 m)	204 lb (93 kg)	Jr	San Marcos, Texas
29	LHP	Tyler Cooper	L/L	6 ft 0 in (1.83 m)	202 lb (92 kg)	Fr	Kyle, Texas
31	RHP	Nick Moore	R/R	6 ft 1 in (1.85 m)	184 lb (83 kg)	Fr	Plano, Texas
32	LHP	Victor Loa	L/L	5 ft 8 in (1.73 m)	178 lb (81 kg)	Fr	Los Fresnos, Texas
34	RHP	Zeke Wood	R/R	6 ft 4 in (1.93 m)	210 lb (95 kg)	Jr	Paris, Texas
35	RHP	Cameron Bush (redshirt)	R/R	6 ft 2 in (1.88 m)	198 lb (90 kg)	So	Round Rock, Texas
36	LHP	Jeb Drewery	L/L	6 ft 1 in (1.85 m)	198 lb (90 kg)	Fr	Hallsville, Texas
38	RHP	Kyler Kirkpatrick	R/R	6 ft 1 in (1.85 m)	239 lb (108 kg)	Fr	Round Rock, Texas
39	RHP	Tony Robie	R/R	6 ft 5 in (1.96 m)	210 lb (95 kg)	So	Mansfield, Texas
40	RHP	Peyton Zabel (redshirt)	R/R	6 ft 6 in (1.98 m)	242 lb (110 kg)	So	Pierre, South Dakota
41	INF	Ryder Hernandez	R/R	5 ft 10 in (1.78 m)	196 lb (89 kg)	Fr	Cedar Park, Texas
42	OF	Damien Whitfield	L/L	6 ft 0 in (1.83 m)	181 lb (82 kg)	Fr	Atlanta, Georgia
43	RHP	Edward Mendoza	R/R	5 ft 11 in (1.8 m)	188 lb (85 kg)	Fr	Eagle Pass, Texas
44	C	Chris Bernal	R/R	5 ft 8 in (1.73 m)	185 lb (84 kg)	Fr	McAllen, Texas
45	RHP	Jonathan Martinez	R/R	5 ft 11 in (1.8 m)	230 lb (104 kg)	So	Mission, Texas
46	RHP	McCray Gann	R/R	5 ft 11 in (1.8 m)	212 lb (96 kg)	Fr	Odessa, Texas
	LHP	Joel Burgess	L/L	6 ft 3 in (1.91 m)	205 lb (93 kg)	Fr	Humble, Texas
	LHP	Rhett McCaffety	L/L	6 ft 0 in (1.83 m)	200 lb (91 kg)	So	Houston, Texas

Head coach

Steven Trout (TCU)

Assistant coach(es)

Josh Blakely (UTSA)
Chad Massengale (Texas State)

Legend

- (C) Team captain
- (S) Suspended
- (I) Ineligible
- Injured
- Current redshirt

Roster
Last update: 31 March 2022

== Schedule and results ==
Legend
	Texas State win
	Texas State loss
	Postponement/Cancelation/Suspensions
**Bold**	Texas State team member

2022 Texas State Bobcats baseball game log
Regular season (44–11)

February (7–1)
Date	Opponent	Rank	Site/stadium	Score	Win	Loss	Save	TV	Attendance	Overall record	SBC record
Feb. 18	Utah Valley		Bobcat Ballpark • San Marcos, TX	**W** 5–3	**Stivors** (1-0)	Voortmeyer (0-1)	None	ESPN+	1,278	1–0	
Feb. 19	Utah Valley		Bobcat Ballpark • San Marcos, TX	**W** 14–4^{8}	**Keithley** (1-0)	McCollough (0-1)	None	ESPN+	1,318	2–0	
Feb. 19	Utah Valley		Bobcat Ballpark • San Marcos, TX	**L** 3–5	Hauck (1-0)	**Bush** (0-1)	Sims (1)	ESPN+	1,318	2–1	
Feb. 20	Utah Valley		Bobcat Ballpark • San Marcos, TX	**W** 14–2^{8}	**Robie** (1-0)	Yocum (0-1)	None	ESPN+	1,090	3–1	
Feb. 23	vs. Wichita State		Globe Life Field • Arlington, TX	Game postponed							
Feb. 24	Wichita State		Bobcat Ballpark • San Marcos, TX	**W** 9–2	**Sundgren** (1-0)	Cranz (0-1)	None		283	4–1	
Feb. 25	Ohio State		Bobcat Ballpark • San Marcos, TX	**W** 9–1	**Wood** (1-0)	Coupet (1-1)	None		900	5–1	
Feb. 26	Ohio State		Bobcat Ballpark • San Marcos, TX	**W** 8–5	**Dixon** (1-0)	Haberthier (0-1)	**Stivors** (1)		1,079	6–1	
Feb. 27	Ohio State		Bobcat Ballpark • San Marcos, TX	**W** 6–4	**Nicholas** (1-0)	Loncar (0-1)	**Stivors** (2)		1,147	7–1	

March (13–5)
Date	Opponent	Rank	Site/stadium	Score	Win	Loss	Save	TV	Attendance	Overall record	SBC record
Mar. 1	Texas–Rio Grande Valley		Bobcat Ballpark • San Marcos, TX	**W** 7–3	**Bush** (1-2)	Serbantez (0-1)	None	ESPN+	985	8–1	
Mar. 4	at No. 11 Arizona		Hi Corbett Field • Tucson, Arizona	**L** 2–7	Nichols (2-0)	**Wood** (1-1)	None	P12N-AZ	2,244	8–2	
Mar. 5	at No. 11 Arizona		Hi Corbett Field • Tucson, AZ	**W** 6-2	**Wells** (1-0)	Irvin (1-1)	**Stivors** (3)	P12N-AZ	2,737	9-2	
Mar. 6	at No. 11 Arizona		Hi Corbett Field • Tucson, AZ	**W** 7-3	**Robie** (2-0)	Flanagan (1-1)	None	P12N-AZ	2,518	10-2	
Mar. 8	vs. No. 1 Texas		Bobcat Ballpark • San Marcos, TX	**L** 8-9	Cobb (1-0)	**Sundgren** (1-1)	Nixon (3)	ESPN+	3,283 (Note: New attendance record for Bobcat Ballpark)	10-3	
Mar. 9	at No. 1 Texas		UFCU Disch–Falk Field • Austin, TX	**W** 6-4	**Wofford** (1-0)	Blair (0-1)	**Stivors** (4)	LHN	7,469	11-3	
Mar. 11	Southern		Bobcat Ballpark • San Marcos, TX	**W** 6–2	**Wood** (2-1)	Battaglia (0-3)	None		333	12–3	
Mar. 12	Southern		Bobcat Ballpark • San Marcos, TX	**W** 15–5	**Wells** (2-0)	Davis (0-2)	None		1,195	13–3	
Mar. 13	Southern		Bobcat Ballpark • San Marcos, TX	**W** 9–5	**Keithley** (2-0)	Fidanza (2-1)	None		1,129	14–3	
Mar. 15	Prairie View A&M	No. 22	Bobcat Ballpark • San Marcos, TX	**W** 8–2	**Sundgren** (2-1)	Curry (0-2)	None		1,405	15–3	
Mar. 18	at Arkansas State	No. 22	Tomlinson Stadium–Kell Field • Jonesboro, AR	**W** 13–7	**Dixon** (2-0)	Anderson (0-2)	None		188	16–3	1–0
Mar. 19	at Arkansas State	No. 22	Tomlinson Stadium–Kell Field • Jonesboro, AR	**W** 2–1	**Wells** (3-0)	Nash (1-1)	**Stivors** (5)		249	17–3	2–0
Mar. 20	at Arkansas State	No. 22	Tomlinson Stadium–Kell Field • Jonesboro, AR	**W** 5–4	**Stivors** (2-0)	Wiseman (0-1)	None		246	18–3	3–0
Mar. 22	at Incarnate Word	No. 20	Sullivan Field • San Antonio, TX	**L** 2–4	Rollins (1-0)	**Sundgren** (2-2)	David (4)		275	18–4	
Mar. 25	Coastal Carolina	No. 20	Bobcat Ballpark • San Marcos, TX	**W** 7–4	**Dixon** (3-0)	Joyce (4-1)	**Stivors** (6)	ESPN+	1,451	19–4	4–0
Mar. 26	Coastal Carolina	No. 20	Bobcat Ballpark • San Marcos, TX	**L** 5–7	VanScoter (4-1)	**Wells** (3-1)	Yablonski (1)	ESPN+	1,608	19–5	4–1
Mar. 27	Coastal Carolina	No. 20	Bobcat Ballpark • San Marcos, TX	**W** 13–9	**Wofford** (2-0)	Maton (1-1)	**Stivors** (7)	ESPN+	1,372	20–5	5–1
Mar. 29	at Sam Houston State	No. 20	Don Sanders Stadium • Huntsville, TX	**L** 9–12	Atkinson (3-0)	**Sundgren** (2-3)	None	ESPN+	1,036	20–6	

April (14–4)
Date	Opponent	Rank	Site/stadium	Score	Win	Loss	Save	TV	Attendance	Overall record	SBC record
Apr. 1	at Appalachian State	No. 20	Beaver Field at Jim and Bettie Smith Stadium • Boone, NC	**W** 7–4	**Stivors** (3-0)	Carter (1-2)	None	ESPN+	385	21–6	6–1
Apr. 2	at Appalachian State	No. 20	Beaver Field at Jim and Bettie Smith Stadium • Boone, NC	**W** 6–2	**Wells** (4-1)	Hamilton (1-4)	None	ESPN+	706	22–6	7–1
Apr. 3	at Appalachian State	No. 20	Beaver Field at Jim and Bettie Smith Stadium • Boone, NC	**W** 7–2	**Dixon** (4-0)	Tujetsch (2-1)	None	ESPN+	286	23–6	8–1
Apr. 5	at Texas A&M	No. 10	Olsen Field at Blue Bell Park • College Station, TX	**L** 4—8	Cortez (4-1)	**Sundgren** (2-4)	None	SECN+	5,371	23—7	
Apr. 8	Georgia Southern	No. 10	Bobcat Ballpark • San Marcos, TX	**L** 4–7	Johnson (3-2)	**Stivors** (3-1)	None	ESPN+	1,608	23–8	8–2
Apr. 9	Georgia Southern	No. 10	Bobcat Ballpark • San Marcos, TX	**L** 11–13	Martin (1-0)	**Zabel** (0-1)	Wray (1)	ESPN+	1,662	23–9	8–3
Apr. 10	Georgia Southern	No. 10	Bobcat Ballpark • San Marcos, TX	**W** 10–9	**Stivors** (4-1)	Johnson (3-3)	None	ESPN+	1,095	24–9	9–3
Apr. 12	Baylor	No. 19	Bobcat Ballpark • San Marcos, TX	**W** 11–4	**Wofford** (3-0)	Cone (0-1)	None	ESPN+	2,047	25–9	
Apr. 14	at UT Arlington	No. 19	Clay Gould Ballpark • Arlington, TX	**W** 6–1	**Wood** (3-1)	King (2-4)	None	ESPN+	585	26–9	10–3
Apr. 15	at UT Arlington	No. 19	Clay Gould Ballpark • Arlington, TX	**W** 5–3	**Stivors** (5-1)	Moffat (0-5)	None	ESPN+	568	27–9	11–3
Apr. 16	at UT Arlington	No. 19	Clay Gould Ballpark • Arlington, TX	**W** 17–6^{7}	**Dixon** (5-0)	Winquest (1-2)	None	ESPN+	619	28–9	12–3
Apr. 19	UTSA	No. 17	Bobcat Ballpark • San Marcos, TX	**W** 14–12	**Dixon** (6-0)	Beaird (1-1)	**Stivors** (8)		1,517	29–9	
Apr. 22	Little Rock	No. 17	Bobcat Ballpark • San Marcos, TX	**W** 3–2	**Wood** (4-1)	Arnold (4-4)	**Stivors** (9)	ESPN+	1,236	30–9	13–3
Apr. 23	Little Rock	No. 17	Bobcat Ballpark • San Marcos, TX	**W** 30–4	**Wells** (5-1)	Weatherley (1-1)	None	ESPN+	1,307	31–9	14–3
Apr. 24	Little Rock	No. 17	Bobcat Ballpark • San Marcos, TX	**W** 9–2	**Dixon** (7-0)	Brewer (2-2)	None	ESPN+	1,176	32–9	15–3
Apr. 26	at UTSA	No. 17	Roadrunner Field • San Antonio, TX	**L** 8–14	Beaird (2-1)	**Nicholas** (1-1)	None	CUSA.tv	563	32–10	
Apr. 29	South Alabama	No. 17	Bobcat Ballpark • San Marcos, TX	**W** 10–2	**Wood** (5-1)	Boswell (5-3)	None		1,204	33–10	16–3
Apr. 30	South Alabama	No. 17	Bobcat Ballpark • San Marcos, TX	**W** 11–10	**Stivors** (6-1)	Carter (0-1)	None		1,324	34–10	17–3

May (10–1)
Date	Opponent	Rank	Site/stadium	Score	Win	Loss	Save	TV	Attendance	Overall record	SBC record
May 1	South Alabama	No. 17	Bobcat Ballpark • San Marcos, TX	**L** 8–21^{7}	Boyd (1-1)	**Bush** (1-2)	None	ESPN+	1,209	34–11	17–4
May 3	Incarnate Word	No. 17	Bobcat Ballpark • San Marcos, TX	**W** 3–1	**Smith** (1-0)	David (2-2)	**Stivors** (10)	ESPN+	1,088	35–11	
May 6	at Louisiana–Monroe	No. 17	Warhawk Field • Monroe, LA	**W** 5–4	**Dixon** (8-0)	Orton (1-1)	**Stivors** (11)	ESPN+	1,046	36–11	18–4
May 7	at Louisiana–Monroe	No. 17	Warhawk Field • Monroe, LA	**W** 9–1	**Wells** (6-1)	Cressend (3-5)	None		1,066	37–11	19–4
May 8	at Louisiana–Monroe	No. 17	Warhawk Field • Monroe, LA	**W** 5–4	**Smith** (2-0)	Judice (2-1)	**Stivors** (12)		982	38–11	20–4
May 13	Louisiana	No. 15	Bobcat Ballpark • San Marcos, TX	**W** 7–5	**Wood** (6-1)	Talley (3-3)	**Stivors** (13)	ESPN+	1,656	39–11	21–4
May 14	Louisiana	No. 15	Bobcat Ballpark • San Marcos, TX	**W** 6–4	**Bush** (2-2)	Hammond (2-1)	**Stivors** (14)	ESPN+	1,487	40–11	22–4
May 15	Louisiana	No. 15	Bobcat Ballpark • San Marcos, TX	**W** 11–9	**Robie** (3-0)	Wilson (4-3)	**Stivors** (15)	ESPN+	1,296	41–11	23–4
May 17	Houston Baptist	No. 13	Bobcat Ballpark • San Marcos, TX	Game cancelled							
May 19	at Georgia State	No. 13	Georgia State Baseball Complex • Decatur, GA	**W** 8–7	**Nicholas** (2-1)	Clark (5-1)	**Stivors** (16)		389	42–11	24–4
May 20	at Georgia State	No. 13	Georgia State Baseball Complex • Decatur, GA	**W** 5–4	**Wells** (7-1)	Patel (2-3)	**Stivors** (17)		392	43–11	25–4
May 21	at Georgia State	No. 13	Georgia State Baseball Complex • Decatur, GA	**W** 4–3	**Robie** (4-0)	Clark (5-2)	**Martinez** (1)		398	44–11	26–4

Postseason (3–3)

SBC Tournament (1–1)
Date	Opponent	(Seed)/Rank	Site/stadium	Score	Win	Loss	Save	TV	Attendance	Overall record	Tournament record
May 27	vs. (10) Louisiana–Monroe	(1)/No. 11	Montgomery Riverwalk Stadium • Montgomery, AL	**W** 8–2	**Stivors** (7-1)	Barlow (2-7)	None	ESPN+		45–11	1–0
May 28	vs. (4) Louisiana	(1)/No. 11	Montgomery Riverwalk Stadium • Montgomery, AL	**L** 2–3	Schultz (4-3)	**Wells** (7-2)	None	ESPN+		45–12	1–1

NCAA tournament (2–2)
Date	Opponent	(Seed)/Rank	Site/stadium	Score	Win	Loss	Save	TV	Attendance	Overall record	Tournament record
Jun. 3	vs. (3)/No. 20 UC Santa Barbara	(2)/No. 13	Klein Field at Sunken Diamond • Stanford, CA	**W** 7–3	**Wood** (7-1)	Lewis (9-1)	None	ESPN+	1,596	46–12	1–0
Jun. 4	vs. (1)/No. 2 Stanford	(2)/No. 13	Klein Field at Sunken Diamond • Stanford, CA	**W** 5–2	**Wells** (8-2)	Williams (8-2)	**Stivors** (18)	ESPNU	2,456	47–12	2–0
Jun. 5	vs. (1)/No. 2 Stanford	(2)/No. 13	Klein Field at Sunken Diamond • Stanford, CA	**L** 4–8	Uber (4-1)	**Robie** (4-1)	None	ESPNU	1,615	47–13	2–1
Jun. 6	vs. (1)/No. 2 Stanford	(2)/No. 13	Klein Field at Sunken Diamond • Stanford, CA	**L** 3–4	Pancer (2-0)	**Wells** (8-3)	None	ESPN2	2,647	47–14	2–2

Schedule source:

*Rankings are based on the team's current ranking in the D1Baseball poll.

== Stanford Regional ==
Stanford Regional Teams
(1) Stanford Cardinal	(2) Texas State Bobcats	(3) UC Santa Barbara Gauchos	(4) Binghamton Bearcats

First Round
1	No. 2 Stanford	20
4	Binghamton	7
3	No. 20 UC Santa Barbara	3
2	No. 13 Texas State	7
Lower round 1
4	Binghamton	4
3	No. 20 UC Santa Barbara	9

Semi-Finals
1	No. 2 Stanford	2
2	No. 13 Texas State	5
Lower final
3	No. 20 UC Santa Barbara	4
1	No. 2 Stanford	8

Finals
2	No. 13 Texas State	4	3
1	No. 2 Stanford	8	4

== Postseason ==
=== Conference Awards ===
- Player of the Year: Dalton Shuffield – TXST
- Ron Maestri Coach of the Year: Steven Trout – TXST

All Conference First Team

- Reid VanScoter (CCU, RS-Sr, P)
- Levi Wells (TXST, So, P)
- Zeke Woods (TXST, Jr, P)
- Tristan Stivors (TXST, Sr, RP)
- Julian Brock (LA, So, C)
- Carson Roccaforte (LA, So, 1B)
- Jesse Sherrill (GASO, Jr, 2B)
- Dalton Shuffield (TXST, Sr, SS)
- Justin Thompson (TXST, Sr, 3B)
- Max Ryerson (GSU, Jr, OF)
- Mason Holt (ULM, Sr, OF)
- Miles Simington (USA, Sr, OF)
- Cameron Jones (GSU, So, UT)
- Noah Ledford (GASO, RS-Jr, DH)

All Conference Second Team

- Hayden Arnold (LR, Sr, P)
- Michael Knorr (CCU, Sr, P)
- Matt Boswell (USA, Sr, P)
- Jay Thomspon (GASO, Jr, RP)
- Hayden Cross (APP, Jr, C)
- Jason Swan (GASO, Sr, 1B)
- Erick Orbeta (USA, RS-So, 2B)
- Griffin Cheney (GSU, Gr, SS)
- Dale Thomas (CCU, Jr, 3B)
- Noah Dickerson (LR, RS-Jr, OF)
- Jose Gonzalez (TXST, Jr, OF)
- John Wuthrich (TXST, Sr, OF)
- Rigsby Mosley (TROY, Sr, UT)
- Tyler Johnson (CCU, Sr, DH)

=== National & Regional ===
Accolade	Recipient	Reference
Collegiate Baseball First Team All-American	Tristan Stivors, P	
Collegiate Baseball Second Team All-American	Dalton Shuffield, INF	
NCBWA First Team All-American	Tristan Stivors, P	
NCBWA Stopper of the Year	Tristan Stivors, P	
ABCA First Team All-American	Tristan Stivors, P	
ABCA First Team All-Region	Tristan Stivors, P	
ABCA Second Team All-Region	Dalton Shuffield, INF; Zeke Wood, P	

== Rankings ==
Ranking movements Legend: ██ Increase in ranking ██ Decrease in ranking — = Not ranked RV = Received votes
	Week																
Poll	Pre	1	2	3	4	5	6	7	8	9	10	11	12	13	14	15	Final
Coaches'	—	—*	RV	RV	23	21	20	15	20	17	18	22	19	17	14	14	19
Baseball America	—	—	—	—	22	22	19	16	18	21	19	18	16	16	15	16	21
Collegiate Baseball^	—	—	—	17	15	9	9	8	18	9	7	15	12	10	9	11	17
NCBWA†	—	—	—	—	26	21	23	23	24	18	20	20	17	11	12	15	18
D1Baseball	—	—	—	—	22	20	20	10	19	17	17	17	15	13	11	13	19

^ Collegiate Baseball ranked 40 teams in their preseason poll, but only ranked 30 teams weekly during the season.
† NCBWA ranks 30 teams in their preseason poll, but only ranks 25 teams weekly during the season.
* A new poll was not released for this week, so for comparison purposes, the previous week's ranking is inserted in this week's slot.
