= 2022 Troy Trojans baseball team =

American college baseball team

2022 Troy Trojans baseball
- Conference: Sun Belt Conference
- Record: 32–24 (15–15 SBC)
- Head coach: Skylar Meade (1st season)
- Assistant coaches: Ben Wolgamot; Adam Godwin; Riley McCauley
- Home stadium: Riddle–Pace Field

2022 Sun Belt Conference baseball standings
	Conf.						Overall
Team	W		L		T	PCT	W		L		T	PCT
No. 13 Texas State ‍†‍‍^{y}	26	–	4	–	0	.867	47	–	14	–	0	.770
No. 21 Georgia Southern ‍‍‍^{y}	23	–	7	–	0	.767	41	–	20	–	0	.672
Coastal Carolina ‍‍‍^{y}	21	–	8	–	1	.717	39	–	20	–	1	.658
Louisiana ‍‍‡‍^{y}	19	–	11	–	0	.633	37	–	23	–	0	.617
South Alabama ‍‍‍	17	–	13	–	0	.567	31	–	23	–	0	.574
Troy ‍‍‍	15	–	15	–	0	.500	32	–	24	–	0	.571
Georgia State ‍‍‍	15	–	15	–	0	.500	30	–	27	–	0	.526
Little Rock ‍‍‍	11	–	18	–	0	.379	24	–	27	–	0	.471
Appalachian State ‍‍‍	10	–	20	–	0	.333	20	–	33	–	0	.377
Louisiana–Monroe ‍‍‍	9	–	20	–	1	.317	20	–	35	–	1	.366
UT Arlington ‍‍‍	7	–	23	–	0	.233	15	–	39	–	0	.278
Arkansas State ‍‍‍	5	–	24	–	0	.172	11	–	38	–	0	.224
† – Conference champion ‡ – Tournament champion y – Invited to the NCAA tournament Rankings from D1Baseball

The 2022 Troy Trojans baseball team represented Troy University during the 2022 NCAA Division I baseball season. The Trojans played their home games at Riddle–Pace Field and were led by first-year head coach Skylar Meade. They were members of the Sun Belt Conference.

== Preseason ==
=== Signing Day Recruits ===
Player	Hometown	Previous Team
Pitchers
Dakota Copeland	Jackson, Georgia	Wallace CC
Grady Gorgen	Mineral Point, Wisconsin	McHenry County
Noah Manning	Minooka, Illinois	Iowa Western CC
Zak Szabo	Ontario, Canada	Sinclair HS
Jeff Wilson	Pensacola, Florida	Pensacola State
Slade Wood	Prattville, Alabama	Prattville HS
Hitters
Ayden Amis	Andalusia, Alabama	Andalusia HS
Brooks Bryan	Opelika, Alabama	Opelika HS
Shane Lewis	Vicksburg, Mississippi	Chipola
Matt Mercer	Richton, Mississippi	Pearl River CC
Brannon Mondragon	Stuart, Florida	Palm Beach State
Kyle Morrison	Wetumpka, Alabama	Wetumpka HS
Jake Smith	Dothan, Alabama	Providence Christian
Witt Wetherington	Boston, Georgia	Thomasville HS

=== Sun Belt Conference Coaches Poll ===
The Sun Belt Conference Coaches Poll was released on February 9, 2022. Troy was picked to finish sixth with 74 votes.

Coaches poll
Predicted finish	Team	Votes (1st place)
1	South Alabama	139 (7)
2	Georgia Southern	118
T3	Coastal Carolina	117 (3)
T3	Louisiana	117 (2)
5	UT Arlington	78
6	Troy	74
7	Texas State	71
8	Little Rock	63
9	Louisiana–Monroe	59
10	Appalachian State	38
11	Georgia State	34
12	Arkansas State	28

=== Preseason All-Sun Belt Team & Honors ===
- Miles Smith (USA Sr, Pitcher)
- Hayden Arnold (LR Sr, Pitcher)
- Tyler Tuthill (APP Jr, Pitcher)
- Brandon Talley (LA Sr, Pitcher)
- Caleb Bartolero (TROY Jr, Catcher)
- Jason Swan (GASO Sr, 1st Base)
- Luke Drumheller (APP Jr, 2nd Base)
- Eric Brown (CCU Jr, Shortstop)
- Ben Klutts (ARST Sr, 3rd Base)
- Christian Avant (GASO Sr, Outfielder)
- Josh Smith (GSU Jr, Outfielder)
- Rigsby Mosley (TROY Sr, Outfielder)
- Cameron Jones (GSU, So, Utility)
- Noah Ledford (GASO Jr, Designated Hitter)

== Personnel ==
2022 Troy Trojans baseball team
Players
Coaches

#	Pos.	Name	B/T	Height	Weight	Year	Home town
2	INF	Jesse Hall	/	5 ft 9 in (1.75 m)	175 lb (79 kg)	Sr	Tallahassee, Florida
4	OF	Trey Leonard	/	6 ft 1 in (1.85 m)	180 lb (82 kg)	Gr	Cedar Rapids, Iowa
5	OF	Cameron Gray	/	6 ft 4 in (1.93 m)	215 lb (98 kg)	So	Marianna, Florida
6	INF	Brady Moore (redshirt)	/	6 ft 1 in (1.85 m)	200 lb (91 kg)	Fr	Talking Rock, Georgia
7	OF	Kyle Mock	/	6 ft 0 in (1.83 m)	208 lb (94 kg)	So	Orlando, Florida
8	C	Caleb Bartolero	/	6 ft 0 in (1.83 m)	215 lb (98 kg)	Jr	Woodstock, Georgia
10	RHP	Matt Snell	/	6 ft 1 in (1.85 m)	197 lb (89 kg)	So	Dothan, Alabama
11	LHP	Ryan Pettys	/	6 ft 2 in (1.88 m)	183 lb (83 kg)	So	Panama City Beach, Florida
12	OF	Seth Johnson	/	6 ft 6 in (1.98 m)	217 lb (98 kg)	So	Wetumpka, Alabama
13	RHP	Brady Fuller	/	6 ft 3 in (1.91 m)	212 lb (96 kg)	Fr	Auburn, Alabama
14	RHP	Bay Witcher	/	6 ft 5 in (1.96 m)	220 lb (100 kg)	Jr	Loganville, Georgia
16	C	Colin Summerhill	/	6 ft 3 in (1.91 m)	205 lb (93 kg)	So	Chicago, Illinois
17	UTL	Justin Kelly	/	6 ft 0 in (1.83 m)	213 lb (97 kg)	Jr	Lynn Haven, Florida
19	INF	Will Mangurian	/	6 ft 1 in (1.85 m)	205 lb (93 kg)	Jr	Johns Creek, Georgia
21	OF	Rigsby Mosley	/	6 ft 2 in (1.88 m)	190 lb (86 kg)	Sr	Maitland, Florida
22	RHP	Marquez Oates	/	6 ft 0 in (1.83 m)	247 lb (112 kg)	Sr	Panama City, Florida
23	INF	Eric Day	/	5 ft 11 in (1.8 m)	187 lb (85 kg)	Fr	Oviedo, Florida
27	RHP	Grayson Stewart (redshirt)	/	5 ft 11 in (1.8 m)	195 lb (88 kg)	Fr	Dothan, Alabama
29	RHP	Mason Kenney	/	6 ft 1 in (1.85 m)	206 lb (93 kg)	Jr	Milton, Georgia
30	INF	William Sullivan	/	6 ft 4 in (1.93 m)	232 lb (105 kg)	So	Orlando, Florida
31	INF	Donovan Whibbs	/	6 ft 1 in (1.85 m)	180 lb (82 kg)	Jr	Pensacola, Florida
32	LHP	Kyle Gamble	/	6 ft 1 in (1.85 m)	202 lb (92 kg)	Jr	Live Oak, Florida
33	OF	Brandon Schrepf	/	6 ft 2 in (1.88 m)	200 lb (91 kg)	Jr	Pensacola, Florida
34	OF	Michael Furry	/	6 ft 0 in (1.83 m)	170 lb (77 kg)	Fr	Orlando, Florida
35	RHP	Dawson Hamilton	/	6 ft 3 in (1.91 m)	200 lb (91 kg)	Fr	Dothan, Alabama
36	LHP	Logan Ross	/	6 ft 1 in (1.85 m)	183 lb (83 kg)	So	Opp, Alabama
37	RHP	Noah Janney	/	6 ft 0 in (1.83 m)	177 lb (80 kg)	So	Windermere, Florida
39	LHP	Dillon Cook	/	6 ft 3 in (1.91 m)	208 lb (94 kg)	Fr	Huntsville, Alabama
40	C	Clay Stearns	/	6 ft 0 in (1.83 m)	222 lb (101 kg)	Jr	Mountain Brook, Alabama
43	OF	Hudson Hartsfield	/	6 ft 0 in (1.83 m)	180 lb (82 kg)	So	Birmingham, Alabama
44	RHP	Garrett Gainous	/	6 ft 4 in (1.93 m)	220 lb (100 kg)	So	Cairo, Georgia
47	RHP	Keaton Fuller	/	5 ft 11 in (1.8 m)	170 lb (77 kg)	Fr	Fairhope, Alabama
49	RHP	Beau Fletcher (redshirt)	/	6 ft 1 in (1.85 m)	229 lb (104 kg)	Fr	Hartselle, Alabama
51	INF	Easton Kirk	/	6 ft 0 in (1.83 m)	220 lb (100 kg)	Sr	Piedmont, Alabama
55	RHP	Judson Hershiser (redshirt)	/	6 ft 0 in (1.83 m)	183 lb (83 kg)	Fr	Windermere, Florida

Head coach

Skylar Meade (Eastern Illinois)

Assistant coach(es)

Ben Wolgamot (Purdue)
Adam Godwin (Troy)
Riley McCauley (Michigan State)

Legend

- (C) Team captain
- (S) Suspended
- (I) Ineligible
- Injured
- Current redshirt

Roster
Last update: 3 June 2022

== Schedule and results ==
Legend
	Troy win
	Troy loss
	Postponement/Cancelation/Suspensions
**Bold**	Troy team member

2022 Troy Trojans baseball game log
Regular season (31–23)

February (5–3)
Date	Opponent	Rank	Site/stadium	Score	Win	Loss	Save	TV	Attendance	Overall record	SBC record
Feb. 18	Holy Cross		Riddle–Pace Field • Troy, AL	**W** 2–1	**Stewart** (1–0)	Fox (0–1)	**Oates** (1)		1,953	1–0	
Feb. 19	Holy Cross		Riddle–Pace Field • Troy, AL	**W** 23–3	**Fuller** (1–0)	Mudd (0–1)	None		2,087	2–0	
Feb. 19	Holy Cross		Riddle–Pace Field • Troy, AL	**W** 11–3	**Witcher** (1–0)	Remley (0–1)	None		2,087	3–0	
Feb. 20	Holy Cross		Riddle–Pace Field • Troy, AL	**W** 8–1	**Ross** (1–0)	McOsker (0–1)	None		1,616	4–0	
Feb. 23	at Auburn		Plainsman Park • Auburn, AL	**L** 1–13	Mullins (1-1)	**Fletcher** (0–1)	None		3,759	4–1	
Feb. 25	at Jacksonville		John Sessions Stadium • Jacksonville, FL	**L** 5–6	Adams (1–0)	**Gainous** (0–1)	Vogel (3)		416	4–2	
Feb. 26	at Jacksonville		John Sessions Stadium • Jacksonville, FL	**W** 5–3	**Stewart** (2–0)	Murphy (1-1)	**Oates** (2)		434	5–2	
Feb. 27	at Jacksonville		John Sessions Stadium • Jacksonville, FL	**L** 3–5	Graham (1–0)	**Witcher** (1–0)	Vogel (4)		416	5–3	

March (12–4)
Date	Opponent	Rank	Site/stadium	Score	Win	Loss	Save	TV	Attendance	Overall record	SBC record
Mar. 2	at Alabama		Sewell–Thomas Stadium • Tuscaloosa, AL	**L** 1–8	McNairy (2–0)	**Stewart** (2–1)	None	ESPN+	2,719	5–4	
Mar. 4	Kennesaw State		Riddle–Pace Field • Troy, AL	**W** 7–2	**Gainous** (1-1)	Myers (0–1)	**Oates** (3)	ESPN+	1,774	6–4	
Mar. 5	Kennesaw State		Riddle–Pace Field • Troy, AL	**L** 4–9	Bezdicek (3–0)	**Fuller** (1-1)	None		1,827	6–5	
Mar. 6	Kennesaw State		Riddle–Pace Field • Troy, AL	**W** 9–6	**Oates** (1–0)	Holler (2–1)	None	ESPN+	1,603	7–5	
Mar. 8	at Jacksonville State		Rudy Abbott Field • Jacksonville, AL	**W** 14–6	**Mosley** (1–0)	Fortner (0–2)	None		509	8–5	
Mar. 11	Indiana		Riddle–Pace Field • Troy, AL	**W** 2–1	**Gainous** (2–1)	Perkins (2–1)	**Oates** (4)	ESPN+	1,458	9–5	
Mar. 13	Indiana		Riddle–Pace Field • Troy, AL	**W** 6–4	**Fuller** (2–1)	Brehmer (1-1)	**Gamble** (1)	ESPN+	1,627	10–5	
Mar. 13	Indiana		Riddle–Pace Field • Troy, AL	**W** 7–4	**Pettys** (1–0)	Sharp (0–3)	**Mosley** (1)	ESPN+	1,626	11–5	
Mar. 15	Samford		Riddle–Pace Field • Troy, AL	Game postponed							
Mar. 18	Louisiana		Riddle–Pace Field • Troy, AL	**W** 7–1	**Gainous** (3–1)	Ray (1–2)	**Gamble** (2)	ESPN+	1,532	12–5	1–0
Mar. 19	Louisiana		Riddle–Pace Field • Troy, AL	**W** 4–3	**Stewart** (3–1)	Schultz (1-1)	None	ESPN+	1,821	13–5	2–0
Mar. 20	Louisiana		Riddle–Pace Field • Troy, AL	**W** 8–3	**Witcher** (2–1)	Wilson (1-1)	**Stewart** (1)	ESPN+	1,729	14–5	3–0
Mar. 22	Alabama State		Riddle–Pace Field • Troy, AL	**W** 11–1	**Mosley** (2–0)	Matos (0–2)	None	ESPN+	1,706	15–5	
Mar. 25	at UT Arlington		Clay Gould Ballpark • Arlington, TX	**L** 5–8	King (1–2)	**Gainous** (3–2)	Moffat (1)		355	15–6	3–1
Mar. 26	at UT Arlington		Clay Gould Ballpark • Arlington, TX	**L** 6–7	Hagan (1–0)	**Gamble** (0–1)	None		442	15–7	3–2
Mar. 27	at UT Arlington		Clay Gould Ballpark • Arlington, TX	**W** 7–3	**Witcher** (3–1)	Bailey (3–2)	**Oates** (5)		350	16–7	4–2
Mar. 29	vs. Alabama State		Montgomery Riverwalk Stadium • Montgomery, AL	**W** 5–4	**Pettys** (2–0)	Rodriguez (1–2)	**Oates** (6)		715	17–7	

April (10–7)
Date	Opponent	Rank	Site/stadium	Score	Win	Loss	Save	TV	Attendance	Overall record	SBC record
Apr. 1	Little Rock		Riddle–Pace Field • Troy, AL	**W** 5–4	**Stewart** (4–1)	Smallwood (2–3)	None	ESPN+	1,976	18–7	5–2
Apr. 2	Little Rock		Riddle–Pace Field • Troy, AL	**L** 3–4	Vaught (2–3)	**Gamble** (0–2)	Smallwood (2)	ESPN+	2,153	18–8	5–3
Apr. 3	Little Rock		Riddle–Pace Field • Troy, AL	**L** 6–10	Brewer (2–0)	**Witcher** (3–2)	Weatherley (1)	ESPN+	1,632	18–9	5–4
Apr. 6	at Southeastern Louisiana		Pat Kenelly Diamond at Alumni Field • Hammond, LA	**L** 4–5	Yuratich (1–0)	**Oates** (1-1)	None		1,140	18–10	
Apr. 8	at Louisiana–Monroe		Warhawk Field • Monroe, LA	**W** 7–2	**Gainous** (4–2)	Barlow (2–3)	**Stewart** (2)		950	19–10	6–4
Apr. 9	at Louisiana–Monroe		Warhawk Field • Monroe, LA	**W** 12–7	**Fuller** (3–1)	Cressend (3-3)	None		1,081	20–10	7–4
Apr. 10	at Louisiana–Monroe		Warhawk Field • Monroe, LA	**W** 13–10^{11}	**Janney** (1–0)	Shaw (0–1)	**Hershiser** (1)		1,036	21–10	8–4
Apr. 12	Jacksonville State		Riddle–Pace Field • Troy, AL	**W** 12–5	**Fuller** (1–0)	Marsh (0–1)	None	ESPN+	1,648	22–10	
Apr. 14	South Alabama		Riddle–Pace Field • Troy, AL	**L** 3–11	Smith (5–1)	**Pettys** (2–1)	None	ESPN+	2,210	22–11	8–5
Apr. 15	South Alabama		Riddle–Pace Field • Troy, AL	**W** 10–8	**Gainous** (5–2)	Booker (3–1)	**Stewart** (3)	ESPN+	1,835	23–11	9–5
Apr. 15	South Alabama		Riddle–Pace Field • Troy, AL	**L** 6–11^{10}	Lin (2–0)	**Gamble** (0–3)	None	ESPN+	1,903	23–12	9–6
Apr. 22	at Arkansas State		Tomlinson Stadium–Kell Field • Jonesboro, AR	**L** 3–4	Medlin (1–4)	**Gainous** (5–3)	Wiseman (3)		343	23–13	9–7
Apr. 23	at Arkansas State		Tomlinson Stadium–Kell Field • Jonesboro, AR	**W** 6–1	**Fuller** (4–1)	Nash (1–4)	None		282	24–13	10–7
Apr. 23	at Arkansas State		Tomlinson Stadium–Kell Field • Jonesboro, AR	**L** 3–4	Jeans (2–4)	**Stewart** (4–2)	None		443	24–14	10–8
Apr. 26	at Georgia Tech		Russ Chandler Stadium • Atlanta, GA	**W** 12–8	**Gamble** (1–3)	Huff (3–2)	None		825	25–14	
Apr. 29	Georgia State		Riddle–Pace Field • Troy, AL	**W** 10–1	**Fuller** (2–0)	Horton (0–1)	None	ESPN+	1,949	26–14	11–8
Apr. 30	Georgia State		Riddle–Pace Field • Troy, AL	**W** 4–3	**Gamble** (2–3)	Watson (1–2)	**Stewart** (4)	ESPN+	1,806	27–14	12–8

May (4–9)
Date	Opponent	Rank	Site/stadium	Score	Win	Loss	Save	TV	Attendance	Overall record	SBC record
May 1	Georgia State		Riddle–Pace Field • Troy, AL	**W** 3–2	**Schrepf** (1–0)	Landry (2–4)	None	ESPN+	1,692	28–14	13–8
May 3	at Samford		Joe Lee Griffin Stadium • Birmingham, AL	**W** 10–8	**Oates** (2–1)	Hobbs (1–3)	**Stewart** (5)		213	29–14	
May 7	at Georgia Southern		J. I. Clements Stadium • Statesboro, GA	**L** 1–24	Fisher (3–2)	**Fuller** (4–2)	None		1,527	29–15	13–9
May 7	at Georgia Southern		J. I. Clements Stadium • Statesboro, GA	**L** 4–8	Thompson (5–2)	**Stewart** (4–3)	None		1,710	29–16	13–10
May 8	at Georgia Southern		J. I. Clements Stadium • Statesboro, GA	**L** 9–10	Martin (3–1)	**Fuller** (2–1)	Madden (2)		1,642	29–17	13–11
May 10	No. 20 Auburn		Riddle–Pace Field • Troy, AL	**L** 4–11	Isbell (1-1)	**Witcher** (3-3)	None	ESPN+	3,212	29–18	
May 13	Coastal Carolina		Riddle–Pace Field • Troy, AL	**L** 6–10	Maniscalco (2–1)	**Gamble** (2–4)	None	ESPN+	2,523	29–19	13–12
May 14	Coastal Carolina		Riddle–Pace Field • Troy, AL	**L** 3–7	Knorr (5–0)	**Fuller** (4–3)	Carney (4)	ESPN+	2,332	29–20	13–13
May 15	Coastal Carolina		Riddle–Pace Field • Troy, AL	**L** 7–11	Parker (4–3)	**Stewart** (4-4)	Maton (3)	ESPN+	2,238	29–21	13–14
May 17	UAB		Riddle–Pace Field • Troy, AL	**L** 8–10	Greene (3–0)	**Witcher** (3–4)	Moza (3)	ESPN+	2,898	29–22	
May 19	at Appalachian State		Beaver Field at Jim and Bettie Smith Stadium • Boone, NC	**W** 14–5	**Mosley** (3–0)	Tuthill (2–7)	None		236	30–22	14–14
May 20	at Appalachian State		Beaver Field at Jim and Bettie Smith Stadium • Boone, NC	**W** 9–2	**Stewart** (5–4)	Ellington (1–3)	None		584	31–22	15–14
May 21	at Appalachian State		Beaver Field at Jim and Bettie Smith Stadium • Boone, NC	**L** 3–6	Roberts (2–0)	**Schrepf** (1-1)	Jernigan (2)		325	31–23	15–15

Postseason (1–1)

SBC Tournament (1–1)
Date	Opponent	(Seed)/Rank	Site/stadium	Score	Win	Loss	Save	TV	Attendance	Overall record	Tournament record
May 27	vs. (3) Coastal Carolina	(6)	Montgomery Riverwalk Stadium • Montgomery, AL	**W** 6–4	**Stewart** (5-5)	Maniscalco (2-2)	**Oates** (7)	ESPN+		32–23	1–0
May 28	vs. (2) Georgia Southern	(6)	Montgomery Riverwalk Stadium • Montgomery, AL	**L** 0–8	Johnson (5–3)	**Gainous** (5–4)	None	ESPN+		32–24	1–1

Schedule source:

*Rankings are based on the team's current ranking in the D1Baseball poll.

== Postseason ==
=== Conference Awards ===
All Conference First Team

- Reid VanScoter (CCU, RS-Sr, P)
- Levi Wells (TXST, So, P)
- Zeke Woods (TXST Jr, P)
- Tristan Stivors (TXST Sr, RP)
- Julian Brock (LA, So, C)
- Carson Roccaforte (LA, So, 1B)
- Jesse Sherrill (GASO Jr, 2B)
- Dalton Shuffield (TXST Sr, SS)
- Justin Thompson (TXST Sr, 3B)
- Max Ryerson (GSU Jr, OF)
- Mason Holt (ULM Sr, OF)
- Miles Simington (USA Sr, OF)
- Cameron Jones (GSU, So, UT)
- Noah Ledford (GASO, RS-Jr, DH)

All Conference Second Team

- Hayden Arnold (LR Sr, P)
- Michael Knorr (CCU Sr, P)
- Matt Boswell (USA Sr, P)
- Jay Thomspon (GASO Jr, RP)
- Hayden Cross (APP Jr, C)
- Jason Swan (GASO Sr, 1B)
- Erick Orbeta (USA, RS-So, 2B)
- Griffin Cheney (GSU, Gr, SS)
- Dale Thomas (CCU Jr, 3B)
- Noah Dickerson (LR, RS-Jr, OF)
- Jose Gonzalez (TXST Jr, OF)
- John Wuthrich (TXST Sr, OF)
- Rigsby Mosley (TROY Sr, UT)
- Tyler Johnson (CCU Sr, DH)
