= 2022 Louisiana–Monroe Warhawks baseball team =

American college baseball season

2022 Louisiana–Monroe Warhawks baseball
- Conference: Sun Belt Conference
- Record: 20–35–1 (9–20–1 SBC)
- Head coach: Michael Federico (5th season)
- Assistant coaches: Matt Collins; Jake Carlson; Kolton Childress
- Home stadium: Warhawk Field

2022 Sun Belt Conference baseball standings
| | Conf. | | | | | | Overall |
| Team | W | | L | | T | PCT | W | | L | | T | PCT |
|---|---|---|---|---|---|---|---|---|---|---|---|---|
| No. 13 Texas State ‍†‍‍^{y} | 26 | – | 4 | – | 0 | .867 | 47 | – | 14 | – | 0 | .770 |
| No. 21 Georgia Southern ‍‍‍^{y} | 23 | – | 7 | – | 0 | .767 | 41 | – | 20 | – | 0 | .672 |
| Coastal Carolina ‍‍‍^{y} | 21 | – | 8 | – | 1 | .717 | 39 | – | 20 | – | 1 | .658 |
| Louisiana ‍‍‡‍^{y} | 19 | – | 11 | – | 0 | .633 | 37 | – | 23 | – | 0 | .617 |
| South Alabama ‍‍‍ | 17 | – | 13 | – | 0 | .567 | 31 | – | 23 | – | 0 | .574 |
| Troy ‍‍‍ | 15 | – | 15 | – | 0 | .500 | 32 | – | 24 | – | 0 | .571 |
| Georgia State ‍‍‍ | 15 | – | 15 | – | 0 | .500 | 30 | – | 27 | – | 0 | .526 |
| Little Rock ‍‍‍ | 11 | – | 18 | – | 0 | .379 | 24 | – | 27 | – | 0 | .471 |
| Appalachian State ‍‍‍ | 10 | – | 20 | – | 0 | .333 | 20 | – | 33 | – | 0 | .377 |
| Louisiana–Monroe ‍‍‍ | 9 | – | 20 | – | 1 | .317 | 20 | – | 35 | – | 1 | .366 |
| UT Arlington ‍‍‍ | 7 | – | 23 | – | 0 | .233 | 15 | – | 39 | – | 0 | .278 |
| Arkansas State ‍‍‍ | 5 | – | 24 | – | 0 | .172 | 11 | – | 38 | – | 0 | .224 |
† – Conference champion ‡ – Tournament champion y – Invited to the NCAA tournament Rankings from D1Baseball

The 2022 Louisiana–Monroe Warhawks baseball team represented the University of Louisiana at Monroe during the 2022 NCAA Division I baseball season. The Warhawks played their home games at Warhawk Field and were led by fifth-year head coach Michael Federico. They were members of the Sun Belt Conference.

== Preseason ==
=== Signing Day Recruits ===
| Player | Hometown | Previous Team |
Pitchers
| Miles Clack | Katy, Texas | LSU-Eunice |
| Brandt Corley | Lucas, Texas | Lovejoy HS |
| Drew Miller | Fernley, Nevada | Fort Scott CC |
| Ben Riley | Saraland, Alabama | Central Alabama CC |
| Tanner Roberts | Denham Springs, Louisiana | Live Oak HS |
| Justin Robinson | Carriere, Mississippi | Pearl River Central HS |
Hitters
| Trey Bridges | Jackson, Mississippi | Jackson Preparatory |
| Jake Haggard | West Palm Beach, Florida | The Benjamin School |
| Cardell Thibodeaux Jr. | Lafayette, Louisiana | Acadiana HS |

=== Sun Belt Conference Coaches Poll ===
The Sun Belt Conference Coaches Poll was released on February 9, 2022. Louisiana–Monroe was picked to finish ninth with 59 votes.

Coaches poll
| Predicted finish | Team | Votes (1st place) |
| 1 | South Alabama | 139 (7) |
| 2 | Georgia Southern | 118 |
| T3 | Coastal Carolina | 117 (3) |
| T3 | Louisiana | 117 (2) |
| 5 | UT Arlington | 78 |
| 6 | Troy | 74 |
| 7 | Texas State | 71 |
| 8 | Little Rock | 63 |
| 9 | Louisiana–Monroe | 59 |
| 10 | Appalachian State | 38 |
| 11 | Georgia State | 34 |
| 12 | Arkansas State | 28 |

=== Preseason All-Sun Belt Team & Honors ===
No players from the Warhawks were chosen.

== Personnel ==
2022 Louisiana–Monroe Warhawks baseball team
Players
Coaches

| # | Pos. | Name | B/T | Height | Weight | Year | Home town |
|---|---|---|---|---|---|---|---|
| 1 | OF | Trace Henry | / | 5 ft 9 in (1.75 m) | 175 lb (79 kg) | Sr | Mooreville, Mississippi |
| 2 | C | Matthew Lee | / | 6 ft 0 in (1.83 m) | 190 lb (86 kg) | So | Baton Rouge, Louisiana |
| 3 | C | Gus Freeman | / | 6 ft 0 in (1.83 m) | 205 lb (93 kg) | So | Leawood, Kansas |
| 4 | INF | Kade Dupont | / | 5 ft 9 in (1.75 m) | 160 lb (73 kg) | Fr | Watson, Louisiana |
| 5 | INF | Michael Cervantes | / | 5 ft 10 in (1.78 m) | 190 lb (86 kg) | So | League City, Texas |
| 6 | OF | Ryan Cupit | / | 5 ft 7 in (1.7 m) | 175 lb (79 kg) | Sr | West Monroe, Louisiana |
| 7 | INF | Carson Jones | / | 5 ft 9 in (1.75 m) | 180 lb (82 kg) | So | Monroe, Louisiana |
| 8 | INF | Giovanni Licciardi | / | 5 ft 11 in (1.8 m) | 175 lb (79 kg) | Fr | Metairie, Louisiana |
| 9 | INF | Colby Deaville | / | 6 ft 3 in (1.91 m) | 180 lb (82 kg) | Sr | Broomfield, Colorado |
| 10 | INF | Grant Schultz | / | 6 ft 0 in (1.83 m) | 202 lb (92 kg) | Sr | Meraux, Louisiana |
| 11 | RHP | Trey Lindsay | / | 6 ft 2 in (1.88 m) | 170 lb (77 kg) | Jr | Beckville, Texas |
| 16 | C | Britt McKay | / | 6 ft 2 in (1.88 m) | 190 lb (86 kg) | Jr | McHenry, Mississippi |
| 17 | OF | Matthew Bihm | / | 5 ft 11 in (1.8 m) | 200 lb (91 kg) | So | Clinton, Louisiana |
| 18 | INF | Chase DeJean | / | 6 ft 3 in (1.91 m) | 200 lb (91 kg) | So | West Monroe, Louisiana |
| 19 | RHP | Lucas Wepf | / | 6 ft 5 in (1.96 m) | 192 lb (87 kg) | Sr | Georgetown, Canada |
| 20 | OF | Mason Holt | / | 5 ft 11 in (1.8 m) | 190 lb (86 kg) | Sr | Coppell, Texas |
| 21 | | Austin Beech | / | 5 ft 11 in (1.8 m) | 185 lb (84 kg) | Jr | Pascagoula, Mississippi |
| 22 | OF | William Perkins | / | 5 ft 11 in (1.8 m) | 185 lb (84 kg) | Fr | Sterlington, Louisiana |
| 23 | INF | Travis Washburn | / | 5 ft 8 in (1.73 m) | 180 lb (82 kg) | Jr | Conroe, Texas |
| 25 | OF | Cole Stromboe (redshirt) | / | 5 ft 10 in (1.78 m) | 180 lb (82 kg) | Fr | River Ridge, Louisiana |
| 27 | RHP | Cole Cressend | / | 6 ft 3 in (1.91 m) | 185 lb (84 kg) | So | Mandeville, Louisiana |
| 28 | LHP | Lane Little | / | 6 ft 2 in (1.88 m) | 185 lb (84 kg) | Fr | West Monroe, Louisiana |
| 29 | RHP | Zach Shaw | / | — | — | Fr | Monroe, Louisiana |
| 30 | RHP | Caleb Sterling | / | 6 ft 0 in (1.83 m) | 195 lb (88 kg) | So | Vicksburg, Mississippi |
| 32 | LHP | Tyler Lien (redshirt) | / | 6 ft 4 in (1.93 m) | 195 lb (88 kg) | Sr | Kirkwood, Missouri |
| 33 | RHP | Kam Partridge | / | 6 ft 1 in (1.85 m) | 200 lb (91 kg) | So | Collinsville, Mississippi |
| 34 | C | Chris Noble | / | 6 ft 2 in (1.88 m) | 215 lb (98 kg) | Jr | Shreveport, Louisiana |
| 35 | LHP | Jackie Robinson | / | 6 ft 1 in (1.85 m) | 185 lb (84 kg) | So | Edmond, Oklahoma |
| 36 | RHP | Connor Cline | / | — | — | Sr | St. Louis, Missouri |
| 37 | RHP | Mikel Howell | / | 6 ft 7 in (2.01 m) | 225 lb (102 kg) | Jr | Huntsville, Texas |
| 39 | INF | Michelle Artzberger | / | 6 ft 0 in (1.83 m) | 205 lb (93 kg) | So | Lawton, Oklahoma |
| 40 | RHP | Carson Orton (redshirt) | / | 6 ft 1 in (1.85 m) | 250 lb (113 kg) | So | Oklahoma City, Oklahoma |
| 41 | RHP | Reid Goleman | / | 6 ft 4 in (1.93 m) | 210 lb (95 kg) | Jr | Moselle, Mississippi |
| 42 | RHP | Nicholas Judice | / | 6 ft 8 in (2.03 m) | 212 lb (96 kg) | So | Baton Rouge, Louisiana |
| 43 | RHP | Tylor Jans | / | 6 ft 4 in (1.93 m) | 225 lb (102 kg) | Jr | Edmonton, Canada |
| 44 | RHP | Henry Shuffler (redshirt) | / | 6 ft 7 in (2.01 m) | 220 lb (100 kg) | Fr | Lafayette, Louisiana |
| 45 | RHP | Cole Brady | / | 6 ft 0 in (1.83 m) | 185 lb (84 kg) | Fr | Nacogdoches, Texas |
| 46 | LHP | Adam Tubbs (redshirt) | / | 5 ft 11 in (1.8 m) | 200 lb (91 kg) | Fr | Sterlington, Louisiana |
| 47 | LHP | Cam Barlow (redshirt) | / | 5 ft 11 in (1.8 m) | 205 lb (93 kg) | So | Halls, Tennessee |
| 48 | RHP | Steve Owings | / | 6 ft 3 in (1.91 m) | 190 lb (86 kg) | Jr | Bixby, Oklahoma |
| 49 | RHP | Jack Englemann | / | 6 ft 2 in (1.88 m) | 185 lb (84 kg) | Sr | Georgetown, Texas |
| 50 | RHP | Wyatt Blalock | / | 6 ft 0 in (1.83 m) | 190 lb (86 kg) | So | Madison, Mississippi |
| 51 | INF | Landon Cato | / | 6 ft 4 in (1.93 m) | 220 lb (100 kg) | So | Birmingham, Alabama |

Head coach

Michael Federico (Southern Miss)

Assistant coach(es)

Matt Collins (Louisiana–Monroe)
Jake Carlson (Nicholls State)
Kolton Childress (Louisiana–Monroe)

Legend

- (C) Team captain
- (S) Suspended
- (I) Ineligible
- Injured
- Current redshirt

Roster
Last update: 7 June 2022

== Schedule and results ==
Legend
| | Louisiana–Monroe win |
| | Louisiana–Monroe loss |
| | Postponement/Cancelation/Suspensions |
| **Bold** | Louisiana–Monroe team member |

2022 Louisiana–Monroe Warhawks baseball game log
Regular season (19–34–1)

February (1–4)
| Date | Opponent | Rank | Site/stadium | Score | Win | Loss | Save | TV | Attendance | Overall record | SBC record |
|---|---|---|---|---|---|---|---|---|---|---|---|
| Feb. 18 | Southern Illinois | | Warhawk Field • Monroe, LA | **W** 1–0 | **Wepf** (1–0) | Steidl (0–1) | None | | 1,045 | 1–0 | |
| Feb. 19 | Southern Illinois | | Warhawk Field • Monroe, LA | **L** 3–11 | Hansell (1–0) | **Jans** (0–1) | None | | 1,005 | 1–1 | |
| Feb. 20 | Southern Illinois | | Warhawk Field • Monroe, LA | **L** 9–10 | McDaniel (1–0) | **Blalock** (0–1) | Combs (1) | | 1,031 | 1–2 | |
| Feb. 25 | Missouri | | Warhawk Field • Monroe, LA | **L** 3–4 | Neubeck (1-1) | **Wepf** (1-1) | Cheeley (1) | | 1,072 | 1–3 | |
| Feb. 26 | Missouri | | Warhawk Field • Monroe, LA | Game cancelled | | | | | | | |
| Feb. 27 | Missouri | | Warhawk Field • Monroe, LA | **L** 2–4 | Troesser (2–0) | **Jans** (0–2) | Cheeley (2) | | 1,013 | 1–4 | |

March (7–9–1)
| Date | Opponent | Rank | Site/stadium | Score | Win | Loss | Save | TV | Attendance | Overall record | SBC record |
|---|---|---|---|---|---|---|---|---|---|---|---|
| Mar. 1 | at No. 2 Ole Miss | | Swayze Field • Oxford, MS | **L** 2–10 | Elliott (1–0) | **Shuffler** (0–1) | Dougherty (1) | SECN+ | 9,407 | 1–5 | |
| Mar. 2 | at No. 2 Ole Miss | | Swayze Field • Oxford, MS | **L** 1–11^{7} | Washburn (2–0) | **Cressend** (0–1) | None | SECN+ | 9,499 | 1–6 | |
| Mar. 4 | New Orleans | | Warhawk Field • Monroe, LA | **L** 2–8 | LeBlanc (3–0) | **Barlow** (0–1) | None | | 1,031 | 1–7 | |
| Mar. 5 | New Orleans | | Warhawk Field • Monroe, LA | **L** 11–13 | Seroski (1–0) | **Wepf** (1–2) | None | | 1,052 | 1–8 | |
| Mar. 6 | New Orleans | | Warhawk Field • Monroe, LA | **L** 5–10 | Williams (2–0) | **Lien** (0–1) | None | | 989 | 1–9 | |
| Mar. 9 | Northwestern State | | Warhawk Field • Monroe, LA | **W** 6–2 | **Cressend** (1-1) | Ohnoutka (1–2) | None | | 972 | 2–9 | |
| Mar. 11 | at Nicholls | | Ben Meyer Diamond at Ray E. Didier Field • Thibodaux, LA | **W** 10–8 | **Barlow** (1-1) | Gearing (2–1) | **Orton** (1) | | 406 | 3–9 | |
| Mar. 12 | at Nicholls | | Ben Meyer Diamond at Ray E. Didier Field • Thibodaux, LA | **L** 2–5 | Theriot (3–1) | **Goleman** (0–1) | Evans (3) | | 201 | 3–10 | |
| Mar. 13 | at Nicholls | | Ben Meyer Diamond at Ray E. Didier Field • Thibodaux, LA | **W** 2–1 | **Lien** (1–1) | Heckman (0–1) | **Wepf** (1) | | 311 | 4–10 | |
| Mar. 15 | Louisiana Tech | | Warhawk Field • Monroe, LA | **L** 4–8 | Martinez (2–0) | **Shuffler** (0–2) | None | ESPN+ | 1,574 | 4–11 | |
| Mar. 18 | at Coastal Carolina | | Springs Brooks Stadium • Conway, SC | **W** 3–2 | **Barlow** (2–1) | Parker (0–1) | **Orton** (2) | ESPN+ | 1,481 | 5–11 | 1–0 |
| Mar. 19 | at Coastal Carolina | | Springs Brooks Stadium • Conway, SC | **L** 4–9 | VanScoter (3–1) | **Cressend** (1–2) | None | ESPN+ | 1,177 | 5–12 | 1–1 |
| Mar. 20 | at Coastal Carolina | | Springs Brooks Stadium • Conway, SC | **T** 17–17^{9} | | | | ESPN+ | 1,370 | 5–12–1 | 1–1–1 |
| Mar. 23 | Stephen F. Austin | | Warhawk Field • Monroe, LA | **W** 13–6 | **Shuffler** (1–2) | Mangus (0–2) | None | | 901 | 6–12–1 | |
| Mar. 25 | Georgia State | | Warhawk Field • Monroe, LA | **W** 5–3^{11} | **Orton** (1–0) | Jones (0–1) | None | ESPN+ | 941 | 7–12–1 | 2–1–1 |
| Mar. 26 | Georgia State | | Warhawk Field • Monroe, LA | **W** 5–2 | **Cressend** (2-2) | Dawson (1–2) | **Shaw** (1) | ESPN+ | 1,120 | 8–12–1 | 3–1–1 |
| Mar. 27 | Georgia State | | Warhawk Field • Monroe, LA | **L** 5–8 | Treadway (4–0) | **Jans** (0–3) | Jones (5) | | 989 | 8–13–1 | 3–2–1 |
| Mar. 29 | at No. 13 LSU | | Alex Box Stadium, Skip Bertman Field • Baton Rouge, LA | **L** 4–15 | Vietmeier (1–0) | **Howell** (0–1) | None | SECN+ | 10,206 | 8–14–1 | |

April (7–11)
| Date | Opponent | Rank | Site/stadium | Score | Win | Loss | Save | TV | Attendance | Overall record | SBC record |
|---|---|---|---|---|---|---|---|---|---|---|---|
| Apr. 1 | at UT Arlington | | Clay Gould Ballpark • Arlington, TX | **L** 2–5 | King (2-2) | **Barlow** (2-2) | Bailey (1) | | 405 | 8–15–1 | 3–3–1 |
| Apr. 2 | at UT Arlington | | Clay Gould Ballpark • Arlington, TX | **W** 5–2 | **Cressend** (3–2) | Wong (1–3) | **Orton** (3) | | 559 | 9–15–1 | 4–3–1 |
| Apr. 3 | at UT Arlington | | Clay Gould Ballpark • Arlington, TX | **L** 2–5 | Winquest (1-1) | **Lien** (1–2) | Moffat (2) | | 474 | 9–16–1 | 4–4–1 |
| Apr. 4 | at Stephen F. Austin | | Jaycees Field • Nacogdoches, TX | **W** 15–6 | **Jans** (1–3) | Boyett (0–2) | None | | 120 | 10–16–1 | |
| Apr. 8 | Troy | | Warhawk Field • Monroe, LA | **L** 2–7 | Gainous (4–2) | **Barlow** (2–3) | Stewart (2) | | 950 | 10–17–1 | 4–5–1 |
| Apr. 9 | Troy | | Warhawk Field • Monroe, LA | **L** 7–12 | Fuller (3–1) | **Cressend** (3-3) | None | | 1,081 | 10–18–1 | 4–6–1 |
| Apr. 10 | Troy | | Warhawk Field • Monroe, LA | **L** 10–13^{11} | Janney (1–0) | **Shaw** (0–1) | Hershiser (1) | | 1,036 | 10–19–1 | 4–7–1 |
| Apr. 12 | at Jackson State | | Braddy Field • Jackson, MS | **W** 8–3 | **Blalock** (1-1) | Johnson (0–1) | None | | 25 | 11–19–1 | |
| Apr. 14 | at Louisiana | | M. L. Tigue Moore Field at Russo Park • Lafayette, LA | **L** 2–14 | Talley (2–1) | **Barlow** (2–4) | None | ESPN+ | 4,037 | 11–20–1 | 4–8–1 |
| Apr. 15 | at Louisiana | | M. L. Tigue Moore Field at Russo Park • Lafayette, LA | **W** 7–5 | **Judice** (1–0) | Rawls (2–1) | **Orton** (4) | | 4,042 | 12–20–1 | 5–8–1 |
| Apr. 16 | at Louisiana | | M. L. Tigue Moore Field at Russo Park • Lafayette, LA | **L** 1–7 | Wilson (3–1) | **Wepf** (1–3) | None | | 4,170 | 12–21–1 | 5–9–1 |
| Apr. 20 | McNeese State | | Warhawk Field • Monroe, LA | **W** 4–3^{10} | **Judice** (2–0) | Vega (2–3) | None | | 1,253 | 13–21–1 | |
| Apr. 22 | Appalachian State | | Warhawk Field • Monroe, LA | **L** 1–5 | Ellington (1–2) | **Barlow** (2–5) | None | ESPN+ | 1,197 | 13–22–1 | 5–10–1 |
| Apr. 23 | Appalachian State | | Warhawk Field • Monroe, LA | **L** 0–10 | Tujetsch (3-3) | **Cressend** (3–4) | None | ESPN+ | 937 | 13–23–1 | 5–11–1 |
| Apr. 24 | Appalachian State | | Warhawk Field • Monroe, LA | **W** 8–5 | **Robinson** (1–0) | Carter (2–3) | **Orton** (5) | | 962 | 14–23–1 | 6–11–1 |
| Apr. 26 | at McNeese State | | Joe Miller Ballpark • Lake Charles, LA | **W** 8–7 | **Shuffler** (2-2) | Payne (3–1) | **Orton** (6) | | 870 | 15–23–1 | |
| Apr. 29 | at Little Rock | | Gary Hogan Field • Little Rock, AR | **L** 3–4 | Smallwood (5–3) | **Wepf** (1–4) | Weatherley (2) | | 179 | 15–24–1 | 6–12–1 |
| Apr. 30 | at Little Rock | | Gary Hogan Field • Little Rock, AR | **L** 9–12 | Vaught (3–4) | **Howell** (0–2) | Weatherley (3) | | 194 | 15–25–1 | 6–13–1 |

May (4–9)
| Date | Opponent | Rank | Site/stadium | Score | Win | Loss | Save | TV | Attendance | Overall record | SBC record |
|---|---|---|---|---|---|---|---|---|---|---|---|
| May 1 | at Little Rock | | Gary Hogan Field • Little Rock, AR | **L** 6–7 | Brewer (3–2) | **Wepf** (1–5) | None | ESPN+ | 297 | 15–26–1 | 6–14–1 |
| May 3 | at Louisiana Tech | | J. C. Love Field at Pat Patterson Park • Ruston, LA | **L** 5–11 | Harland (3–0) | **Robinson** (1-1) | None | | 2,512 | 15–27–1 | |
| May 6 | No. 17 Texas State | | Warhawk Field • Monroe, LA | **L** 4–5 | Dixon (8–0) | **Orton** (1-1) | Stivors (11) | ESPN+ | 1,046 | 15–28–1 | 6–15–1 |
| May 7 | No. 17 Texas State | | Warhawk Field • Monroe, LA | **L** 1–9 | Wells (6–1) | **Cressend** (3–5) | None | | 1,066 | 15–29–1 | 6–16–1 |
| May 8 | No. 17 Texas State | | Warhawk Field • Monroe, LA | **L** 4–5 | Smith (2–0) | **Judice** (2–1) | Stivors (12) | | 982 | 15–30–1 | 6–17–1 |
| May 10 | at Northwestern State | | H. Alvin Brown–C. C. Stroud Field • Natchitoches, LA | **L** 5–10 | Francis (1-1) | **Brady** (0–1) | None | | 414 | 15–31–1 | |
| May 11 | Jackson State | | Warhawk Field • Monroe, LA | **W** 13–2^{8} | **Engelmann** (1–0) | Marulanda (6–7) | **Blalock** (1) | | 1,076 | 16–31–1 | |
| May 13 | at South Alabama | | Eddie Stanky Field • Mobile, AL | **L** 4–12 | Booker (4–2) | **Barlow** (2–6) | None | ESPN+ | 1,007 | 16–32–1 | 6–18–1 |
| May 14 | at South Alabama | | Eddie Stanky Field • Mobile, AL | **L** 1–3 | Boyd (2–1) | **Cressend** (3–6) | None | ESPN+ | 1,106 | 16–33–1 | 6–19–1 |
| May 15 | at South Alabama | | Eddie Stanky Field • Mobile, AL | **L** 2–4 | Johnson (4–2) | **Jans** (1–4) | Stokes (2) | ESPN+ | 1,081 | 16–34–1 | 6–20–1 |
| May 19 | Arkansas State | | Warhawk Field • Monroe, LA | **W** 16–9 | **Judice** (3–1) | Medlin (1–7) | None | ESPN+ | 1,109 | 17–34–1 | 7–20–1 |
| May 20 | Arkansas State | | Warhawk Field • Monroe, LA | **W** 13–7 | **Jans** (2–4) | Nash (1–7) | None | ESPN+ | 1,125 | 18–34–1 | 8–20–1 |
| May 21 | Arkansas State | | Warhawk Field • Monroe, LA | **W** 6–3 | **Wepf** (2–5) | Holt (0–3) | None | ESPN+ | 1,073 | 19–34–1 | 9–20–1 |

Postseason (1–1)

SBC Tournament (1–1)
| Date | Opponent | (Seed)/Rank | Site/stadium | Score | Win | Loss | Save | TV | Attendance | Overall record | Tournament record |
|---|---|---|---|---|---|---|---|---|---|---|---|
| May 24 | vs. (7) Georgia State | (10) | Montgomery Riverwalk Stadium • Montgomery, AL | **W** 8–5 | **Orton** (2–1) | Watson (1–4) | None | ESPN+ | | 20–34–1 | 1–0 |
| May 27 | vs. (1)/No. 11 Texas State | (10) | Montgomery Riverwalk Stadium • Montgomery, AL | **L** 2–8 | Stivors (7–1) | **Barlow** (2–7) | None | ESPN+ | | 20–35–1 | 1–1 |

Schedule source:

*Rankings are based on the team's current ranking in the D1Baseball poll.

== Postseason ==
=== Conference Awards ===
All Conference First Team

- Reid VanScoter (CCU, RS-Sr, P)
- Levi Wells (TXST, So, P)
- Zeke Woods (TXST Jr, P)
- Tristan Stivors (TXST Sr, RP)
- Julian Brock (LA, So, C)
- Carson Roccaforte (LA, So, 1B)
- Jesse Sherrill (GASO Jr, 2B)
- Dalton Shuffield (TXST Sr, SS)
- Justin Thompson (TXST Sr, 3B)
- Max Ryerson (GSU Jr, OF)
- Mason Holt (ULM Sr, OF)
- Miles Simington (USA Sr, OF)
- Cameron Jones (GSU, So, UT)
- Noah Ledford (GASO, RS-Jr, DH)

All Conference Second Team

- Hayden Arnold (LR Sr, P)
- Michael Knorr (CCU Sr, P)
- Matt Boswell (USA Sr, P)
- Jay Thomspon (GASO Jr, RP)
- Hayden Cross (APP Jr, C)
- Jason Swan (GASO Sr, 1B)
- Erick Orbeta (USA, RS-So, 2B)
- Griffin Cheney (GSU, Gr, SS)
- Dale Thomas (CCU Jr, 3B)
- Noah Dickerson (LR, RS-Jr, OF)
- Jose Gonzalez (TXST Jr, OF)
- John Wuthrich (TXST Sr, OF)
- Rigsby Mosley (TROY Sr, UT)
- Tyler Johnson (CCU Sr, DH)
