= 2022 Appalachian State Mountaineers baseball team =

American college baseball season

2022 Appalachian State Mountaineers baseball
- Conference: Sun Belt Conference
- Record: 20–33 (10–20 SBC)
- Head coach: Kermit Smith (6th season)
- Assistant coaches: Justin Aspergren; Britt Johnson
- Home stadium: Beaver Field at Jim and Bettie Smith Stadium

2022 Sun Belt Conference baseball standings
	Conf.						Overall
Team	W		L		T	PCT	W		L		T	PCT
No. 13 Texas State ‍†‍‍^{y}	26	–	4	–	0	.867	47	–	14	–	0	.770
No. 21 Georgia Southern ‍‍‍^{y}	23	–	7	–	0	.767	41	–	20	–	0	.672
Coastal Carolina ‍‍‍^{y}	21	–	8	–	1	.717	39	–	20	–	1	.658
Louisiana ‍‍‡‍^{y}	19	–	11	–	0	.633	37	–	23	–	0	.617
South Alabama ‍‍‍	17	–	13	–	0	.567	31	–	23	–	0	.574
Troy ‍‍‍	15	–	15	–	0	.500	32	–	24	–	0	.571
Georgia State ‍‍‍	15	–	15	–	0	.500	30	–	27	–	0	.526
Little Rock ‍‍‍	11	–	18	–	0	.379	24	–	27	–	0	.471
Appalachian State ‍‍‍	10	–	20	–	0	.333	20	–	33	–	0	.377
Louisiana–Monroe ‍‍‍	9	–	20	–	1	.317	20	–	35	–	1	.366
UT Arlington ‍‍‍	7	–	23	–	0	.233	15	–	39	–	0	.278
Arkansas State ‍‍‍	5	–	24	–	0	.172	11	–	38	–	0	.224
† – Conference champion ‡ – Tournament champion y – Invited to the NCAA tournament Rankings from D1Baseball

The 2022 Appalachian State Mountaineers baseball team represented Appalachian State University during the 2022 NCAA Division I baseball season. The Mountaineers played their home games at Beaver Field at Jim and Bettie Smith Stadium and were led by sixth-year head coach Kermit Smith. They were members of the Sun Belt Conference.

== Preseason ==
=== Signing Day Recruits ===
Player	Hometown	Previous Team
Pitchers
Seth Whitley	Maiden, North Carolina	North Lincoln HS
Tim Cao	Oak Ridge, North Carolina	Walters State CC
Cameron Carter	Valdosta, Georgia	Seminole State
Caleb Cross	Sanford, North Carolina	UNC-Asheville
Xander Hamilton	Raleigh, North Carolina	Virginia Tech
Trey Jernigan	Greenville, North Carolina	UNC-Asheville
Grey LaSpaluto	Apex, North Carolina	Chattanooga State CC
Hitters
Braxton Church	North Wilkesboro, North Carolina	West Wilkes HS
RJ Johnson	Henderson, North Carolina	Kerr-Vance Academy
Alex Aguila	Hialeah, Florida	Hillsborough CC
Alex Reed	Chester, South Carolina	Brunswick CC
Dylan Rogers	Spartanburg, South Carolina	Chattahoochee Valley CC
Austin St. Lauren	Alamance, North Carolina	East Carolina
Jacob Whitley	Clemmons, North Carolina	UNC-Charlotte

=== Sun Belt Conference Coaches Poll ===
The Sun Belt Conference Coaches Poll was released on February 9, 2022. Appalachian State was picked to finish tenth with 38 votes.

Coaches poll
Predicted finish	Team	Votes (1st place)
1	South Alabama	139 (7)
2	Georgia Southern	118
T3	Coastal Carolina	117 (3)
T3	Louisiana	117 (2)
5	UT Arlington	78
6	Troy	74
7	Texas State	71
8	Little Rock	63
9	Louisiana–Monroe	59
10	Appalachian State	38
11	Georgia State	34
12	Arkansas State	28

=== Preseason All-Sun Belt Team & Honors ===
- Miles Smith (USA, Sr, Pitcher)
- Hayden Arnold (LR, Sr, Pitcher)
- Tyler Tuthill (APP, Jr, Pitcher)
- Brandon Talley (LA, Sr, Pitcher)
- Caleb Bartolero (TROY, Jr, Catcher)
- Jason Swan (GASO, Sr, 1st Base)
- Luke Drumheller (APP, Jr, 2nd Base)
- Eric Brown (CCU, Jr, Shortstop)
- Ben Klutts (ARST, Sr, 3rd Base)
- Christian Avant (GASO, Sr, Outfielder)
- Josh Smith (GSU, Jr, Outfielder)
- Rigsby Mosley (TROY, Sr, Outfielder)
- Cameron Jones (GSU, So, Utility)
- Noah Ledford (GASO, Jr, Designated Hitter)

== Personnel ==
2022 Appalachian State Mountaineers baseball team
Players
Coaches

#	Pos.	Name	B/T	Height	Weight	Year	Home town
2	OF	RJ Johnson	L/L	5 ft 9 in (1.75 m)	176 lb (80 kg)	Fr	Franklinton, North Carolina
3		Andrew Terrell	R/R	5 ft 10 in (1.78 m)	168 lb (76 kg)	Jr	Franklin, North Carolina
4	INF	Luke Drumheller	L/R	6 ft 1 in (1.85 m)	198 lb (90 kg)	Jr	Charlotte, North Carolina
5	INF	Alex Aguila	R/R	5 ft 7 in (1.7 m)	168 lb (76 kg)	Jr	Hialeah, Florida
6	C	Carson Arnold	R/R	5 ft 11 in (1.8 m)	188 lb (85 kg)	So	Mooresville, North Carolina
7	INF	Austin St. Laurent (redshirt)	R/R	5 ft 11 in (1.8 m)	188 lb (85 kg)	Fr	Elon, North Carolina
8	C	Jacob Whitley	R/R	6 ft 2 in (1.88 m)	190 lb (86 kg)	Gr	Clemmons, North Carolina
9	OF	Hunter Bryson (redshirt)	R/R	5 ft 11 in (1.8 m)	190 lb (86 kg)	Fr	Charlotte, North Carolina
10	RHP	Cameron Kepley (redshirt)	R/R	6 ft 2 in (1.88 m)	185 lb (84 kg)	Sr	Midland, North Carolina
14	RHP	Cy Smith	R/R	5 ft 11 in (1.8 m)	200 lb (91 kg)	So	Lenoir, North Carolina
17		Andrew Greckel	L/R	5 ft 10 in (1.78 m)	182 lb (83 kg)	Gr	Acworth, Georgia
18	RHP	Xander Hamilton	L/R	6 ft 3 in (1.91 m)	216 lb (98 kg)	So	Raleigh, North Carolina
19	OF	Dalton Williams	L/R	6 ft 1 in (1.85 m)	207 lb (94 kg)	Sr	Dallas, North Carolina
21	LHP	Tyler Tuthill	L/L	6 ft 2 in (1.88 m)	215 lb (98 kg)	Jr	Clayton, North Carolina
22	RHP	Seth Whitley	R/R	6 ft 2 in (1.88 m)	179 lb (81 kg)	Fr	Maiden, North Carolina
24	INF	Alex Reed	L/R	6 ft 0 in (1.83 m)	205 lb (93 kg)	Jr	Chester, South Carolina
25	RHP	Trey Jernigan	R/R	6 ft 1 in (1.85 m)	197 lb (89 kg)	Gr	Greenville, North Carolina
26	RHP	Jason Cornatzer (redshirt)	R/R	6 ft 5 in (1.96 m)	182 lb (83 kg)	Sr	Waxhaw, North Carolina
27	C	Braxton Church	L/R	5 ft 9 in (1.75 m)	172 lb (78 kg)	Fr	North Wilkesboro, North Carolina
28	OF	Dylan Rogers	L/L	6 ft 1 in (1.85 m)	206 lb (93 kg)	So	Spartanburg, South Carolina
29	LHP	Eli Ellington (redshirt)	L/L	6 ft 4 in (1.93 m)	228 lb (103 kg)	Jr	Charlotte, North Carolina
30	RHP	Shane Roberts (redshirt)	R/R	6 ft 0 in (1.83 m)	209 lb (95 kg)	Sr	Jupiter, Florida
33	RHP	Austin Primm	R/R	6 ft 3 in (1.91 m)	245 lb (111 kg)	Jr	Dallas, North Carolina
34	OF	Phillip Cole	R/R	6 ft 1 in (1.85 m)	217 lb (98 kg)	Jr	Burlington, North Carolina
35	C	Hayden Cross	L/R	5 ft 11 in (1.8 m)	192 lb (87 kg)	Jr	Sanford, North Carolina
37	RHP	Caleb Cross	R/R	6 ft 2 in (1.88 m)	177 lb (80 kg)	So	Sanford, North Carolina
38	RHP	Trey Tujetsch	R/R	5 ft 9 in (1.75 m)	163 lb (74 kg)	So	Fort Mill, South Carolina
40	INF	Vasili Kaloudis	L/R	6 ft 0 in (1.83 m)	190 lb (86 kg)	So	Charlotte, North Carolina
42	RHP	Jeriah Henry	R/R	6 ft 2 in (1.88 m)	200 lb (91 kg)	Jr	Lake Wales, Florida
44	RHP	Grey LaSpaluto	R/R	5 ft 10 in (1.78 m)	162 lb (73 kg)	So	Apex, North Carolina
46	RHP	Jordan Fisher	R/R	6 ft 4 in (1.93 m)	188 lb (85 kg)	Fr	Denver, North Carolina

Head coach

Kermit Smith (California–Pennsylvania)

Assistant coach(es)

Justin Aspegren (California–Pennsylvania)
Britt Johnson (East Carolina)
Ryan Smoot (VMI)

Legend

- (C) Team captain
- (S) Suspended
- (I) Ineligible
- Injured
- Current redshirt

Roster
Last update: 7 June 2022

== Schedule and results ==
Legend
	Appalachian State win
	Appalachian State loss
	Postponement/Cancelation/Suspensions
**Bold**	Appalachian State team member

2022 Appalachian State Mountaineers baseball game log
Regular season (19–32)

February (3–4)
Date	Opponent	Rank	Site/stadium	Score	Win	Loss	Save	TV	Attendance	Overall record	SBC record
Feb. 18	at Campbell		Jim Perry Stadium • Buies Creek, NC	**L** 0–9	Harrington (1-0)	**Tuthill** (0-1)	Chasse (1)	ESPN+	780	0–1	
Feb. 19	at Campbell		Jim Perry Stadium • Buies Creek, NC	**W** 5–1	**Hamilton** (1-0)	Kuehler (0-1)	**Ellington** (1)		679	1–1	
Feb. 20	at Campbell		Jim Perry Stadium • Buies Creek, NC	**W** 5–4	**Jernigan** (1–0)	O'Brien (0-1)	None	ESPN+	652	2–1	
Feb. 22	at No. 23 Duke		Durham Bulls Athletic Park • Durham, NC	**L** 5–8	McRoy (1-0)	**Carter** (0-1)	Allen (1)	ACCN+	409	2–2	
Feb. 25	at UNC Greensboro		UNCG Baseball Stadium • Greensboro, NC	**L** 7–16	Mathew (1-0)	**Tuthill** (0-2)	None	ESPN+	899	2–3	
Feb. 26	at UNC Greensboro		UNCG Baseball Stadium • Greensboro, NC	**L** 0–5	Parsl (1-0)	**Hamilton** (1-1)	Hoppe (1)	ESPN+	468	2–4	
Feb. 27	at UNC Greensboro		UNCG Baseball Stadium • Greensboro, NC	**W** 10–1	**Tujetsch** (2-0)	Murchison (0-1)	**Jernigan** (1)		112	3–4	

March (7–9)
Date	Opponent	Rank	Site/stadium	Score	Win	Loss	Save	TV	Attendance	Overall record	SBC record
Mar. 1	vs. South Carolina		Truist Field • Charlotte, NC	**L** 6–9	Hunter (2-0)	**Ellington** (0-1)	Braswell (2)	SECN+	2,345	3–5	
Mar. 4	UNC Wilmington		Beaver Field at Jim and Bettie Smith Stadium • Boone, NC	**W** 4–2	**Tuthill** (1-2)	Gaither (1-1)	**Ellington** (2)	ESPN+	475	4–5	
Mar. 5	UNC Wilmington		Beaver Field at Jim and Bettie Smith Stadium • Boone, NC	**W** 12–11	**Kepley** (1-0)	Hodges (1-1)	None		700	5–5	
Mar. 6	UNC Wilmington		Beaver Field at Jim and Bettie Smith Stadium • Boone, NC	**L** 3–12	Gair (1-0)	**Jernigan** (1-1)	None	ESPN+	549	5–6	
Mar. 8	at Davidson		T. Henry Wilson Jr. Field • Davidson, NC	Game postponed							
Mar. 11	vs. Charlotte		Truist Field • Charlotte, NC	**L** 3–9	Rossi (2-0)	**Tuthill** (1-3)	None		452	5–7	
Mar. 12	Charlotte		Robert and Mariam Hayes Stadium • Charlotte, NC	**L** 7–12	Wilson (1-0)	**Kepley** (1-1)	None		815	5–8	
Mar. 13	Charlotte		Robert and Mariam Hayes Stadium • Charlotte, NC	**W** 9–7^{12}	**Carter** (1-1)	Thompson (0-2)	None		830	6–8	
Mar. 15	at North Carolina A&T		World War Memorial Stadium • Greensboro, NC	**L** 2–4	Brown (1-1)	**LaSpaluto** (0-1)	DeMurias (2)		143	6–9	
Mar. 18	Georgia Southern		Beaver Field at Jim and Bettie Smith Stadium • Boone, NC	**L** 6–7	Paden (3-0)	**Tuthill** (1-5)	Thompson (4)	ESPN+	412	6–10	0–1
Mar. 19	Georgia Southern		Beaver Field at Jim and Bettie Smith Stadium • Boone, NC	**L** 2–5	Fisher (1-1)	**Hamilton** (1-2)	None	ESPN+	833	6–11	0–2
Mar. 20	Georgia Southern		Beaver Field at Jim and Bettie Smith Stadium • Boone, NC	**W** 11–6	**Tujetsch** (1-0)	Johnson (1-2)	None	ESPN+	390	7–11	1–2
Mar. 22	at No. 13 North Carolina		Boshamer Stadium • Chapel Hill, NC	**L** 2–4	O'Brien (1-0)	**Ellington** (0-2)	None		2,614	7–12	
Mar. 25	at Little Rock		Gary Hogan Field • Little Rock, AR	**W** 5–2^{14}	**LaSpaluto** (1-1)	Smallwood (2-2)	None		169	8–12	2–2
Mar. 26	at Little Rock		Gary Hogan Field • Little Rock, AR	**L** 4–7	Vaught (1-2)	**Hamilton** (1-3)	Martin (2)		136	8–13	2–3
Mar. 27	at Little Rock		Gary Hogan Field • Little Rock, AR	**W** 10–5	**Tujetsch** (2-0)	Vaught (1-3)	None		127	9–13	3–3
Mar. 29	UNC Asheville		L. P. Frans Stadium • Hickory, NC	**W** 11–1^{7}	**Cornatzer** (1-0)	Schiff (0-1)	**LaSpaluto** (1)		1,163	10–13	

April (4–13)
Date	Opponent	Rank	Site/stadium	Score	Win	Loss	Save	TV	Attendance	Overall record	SBC record
Apr. 1	No. 20 Texas State		Beaver Field at Jim and Bettie Smith Stadium • Boone, NC	**L** 4–7	Stivors (3-0)	**Carter** (1-2)	None	ESPN+	385	10–14	3–4
Apr. 2	No. 20 Texas State		Beaver Field at Jim and Bettie Smith Stadium • Boone, NC	**L** 2–6	Wells (4-1)	**Hamilton** (1-4)	None	ESPN+	706	10–15	3–5
Apr. 3	No. 20 Texas State		Beaver Field at Jim and Bettie Smith Stadium • Boone, NC	**L** 2–7	Dixon (4-0)	**Tujetsch** (2-1)	None	ESPN+	286	10–16	3–6
Apr. 5	at UAB		Thomas Stadium • Johnson City, TN	Game cancelled							
Apr. 8	at South Alabama		Eddie Stanky Field • Mobile, AL	**L** 0–9	Boswell (5-2)	**Cornatzer** (1-1)	None	ESPN+	1,047	10–17	3–7
Apr. 9	at South Alabama		Eddie Stanky Field • Mobile, AL	**L** 2–6	Booker (3-0)	**Hamilton** (1-5)	None	ESPN+	1,165	10–18	3–8
Apr. 10	at South Alabama		Eddie Stanky Field • Mobile, AL	**L** 0–9	Lehrmann (2-1)	**Tujetsch** (2-2)	None	ESPN+	1,063	10–19	3–9
Apr. 12	High Point		Beaver Field at Jim and Bettie Smith Stadium • Boone, NC	**W** 17–9	**Cross** (1-0)	Viar (1-2)	None	ESPN+	478	11–19	
Apr. 14	Coastal Carolina		Beaver Field at Jim and Bettie Smith Stadium • Boone, NC	**L** 3–14	VanScoter (6-2)	**Carter** (1-3)	None	ESPN+	478	11–20	3–10
Apr. 15	Coastal Carolina		Beaver Field at Jim and Bettie Smith Stadium • Boone, NC	**L** 1–6	Knorr (2-0)	**Hamilton** (1-6)	None		575	11–21	3–11
Apr. 16	Coastal Carolina		Beaver Field at Jim and Bettie Smith Stadium • Boone, NC	**L** 3–9	Parker (2-2)	**Tujetsch** (2-3)	Carney (2)	ESPN+	485	11–22	3–12
Apr. 19	at Wake Forest		David F. Couch Ballpark • Winston-Salem, NC	**L** 5–6	Mascolo (2-0)	**Kepley** (1-1)	None	1,214	11–23		
Apr. 22	at Louisiana–Monroe		Warhawk Field • Monroe, LA	**W** 5–1	**Ellington** (1-2)	Barlow (2-5)	None	ESPN+	1,197	12–23	4–12
Apr. 23	at Louisiana–Monroe		Warhawk Field • Monroe, LA	**W** 10–0	**Tujetsch** (3-3)	Cressend (3-4)	None	ESPN+	937	13–23	5–12
Apr. 24	at Louisiana–Monroe		Warhawk Field • Monroe, LA	**L** 5–8	Robinson (1-0)	**Carter** (2-3)	Orton (5)		962	13–24	5–13
Apr. 26	Davidson		Beaver Field at Jim and Bettie Smith Stadium • Boone, NC	**W** 10–9	**Roberts** (1-0)	Fix (0-1)	None		204	14–24	
Apr. 29	Louisiana		Beaver Field at Jim and Bettie Smith Stadium • Boone, NC	**L** 3–14	Talley (3-2)	**Tuthill** (1-5)	None		310	14–25	5–14
Apr. 30	Louisiana		Beaver Field at Jim and Bettie Smith Stadium • Boone, NC	**L** 7–12	Perrin (1-0)	**Tujetsch** (3-4)	None		552	14–26	5–15

May (5–6)
Date	Opponent	Rank	Site/stadium	Score	Win	Loss	Save	TV	Attendance	Overall record	SBC record
May 1	Louisiana		Beaver Field at Jim and Bettie Smith Stadium • Boone, NC	**W** 9–4	**Cornatzer** (2-1)	Wilson (4-2)	**Carter** (1)		135	15–26	6–15
May 3	East Tennessee State		Beaver Field at Jim and Bettie Smith Stadium • Boone, NC	Game cancelled							
May 6	at Georgia State		Georgia State Baseball Complex • Decatur, GA	**L** 1–12	Horton (1-1)	**Tuthill** (1-6)	None		351	15–27	6–16
May 7	at Georgia State		Georgia State Baseball Complex • Decatur, GA	**L** 2–4	Clark (4-0)	**Cross** (1-1)	Watson (8)		391	15–28	6–17
May 8	at Georgia State		Georgia State Baseball Complex • Decatur, GA	**W** 10–7	**Cornatzer** (3-1)	Patel (1-2)	**Kepley** (1)		389	16–28	7–17
May 13	at UT Arlington		Clay Gould Ballpark • Arlington, TX	**W** 3–1	**Tuthill** (2-6)	King (2-5)	**Jernigan** (1)	ESPN+	425	17–28	8–17
May 14	at UT Arlington		Clay Gould Ballpark • Arlington, TX	**W** 3–1	**Cross** (2-1)	Wong (1-6)	None	ESPN+	378	18–28	9–17
May 15	at UT Arlington		Clay Gould Ballpark • Arlington, TX	**L** 0–7	Winquest (2-3)	**Cornatzer** (3-2)	None	ESPN+	356	18–29	9–18
May 17	Wake Forest		Beaver Field at Jim and Bettie Smith Stadium • Boone, NC	**L** 4–18	Keener (5-1)	**LaSpaluto** (1-2)	None	ESPN+	608	18–30	
May 19	Troy		Beaver Field at Jim and Bettie Smith Stadium • Boone, NC	**L** 5–14	Mosley (3-0)	**Tuthill** (2-7)	None	ESPN+	236	18–31	9–19
May 20	Troy		Beaver Field at Jim and Bettie Smith Stadium • Boone, NC	**L** 2–9	Stewart (5-4)	**Ellington** (1-3)	None	ESPN+	584	18–32	9–20
May 21	Troy		Beaver Field at Jim and Bettie Smith Stadium • Boone, NC	**W** 6–3	**Roberts** (2-0)	Schrepf (1-1)	**Jernigan** (2)	ESPN+	325	19–32	10–20

Postseason (1–1)

SBC Tournament (1–1)
Date	Opponent	(Seed)/Rank	Site/stadium	Score	Win	Loss	Save	TV	Attendance	Overall record	Tournament record
May 24	vs. (8) Little Rock	(9)	Montgomery Riverwalk Stadium • Montgomery, AL	**W** 10–3	**Cross** (3-1)	Smallwood (5-6)	None	ESPN+		20–32	1–0
May 27	vs. (2) Georgia Southern	(9)	Montgomery Riverwalk Stadium • Montgomery, AL	**L** 1–7	Thompson (7-3)	**Tujetsch** (3-5)	None	ESPN+		20–33	1–1

Schedule source:

*Rankings are based on the team's current ranking in the D1Baseball poll.

== Postseason ==
=== Conference Awards ===
- Freshman of the Year: Austin St. Laurent – APP

All Conference First Team

- Reid VanScoter (CCU, RS-Sr, P)
- Levi Wells (TXST, So, P)
- Zeke Woods (TXST, Jr, P)
- Tristan Stivors (TXST, Sr, RP)
- Julian Brock (LA, So, C)
- Carson Roccaforte (LA, So, 1B)
- Jesse Sherrill (GASO, Jr, 2B)
- Dalton Shuffield (TXST, Sr, SS)
- Justin Thompson (TXST, Sr, 3B)
- Max Ryerson (GSU, Jr, OF)
- Mason Holt (ULM, Sr, OF)
- Miles Simington (USA, Sr, OF)
- Cameron Jones (GSU, So, UT)
- Noah Ledford (GASO, RS-Jr, DH)

All Conference Second Team

- Hayden Arnold (LR, Sr, P)
- Michael Knorr (CCU, Sr, P)
- Matt Boswell (USA, Sr, P)
- Jay Thomspon (GASO, Jr, RP)
- Hayden Cross (APP, Jr, C)
- Jason Swan (GASO, Sr, 1B)
- Erick Orbeta (USA, RS-So, 2B)
- Griffin Cheney (GSU, Gr, SS)
- Dale Thomas (CCU, Jr, 3B)
- Noah Dickerson (LR, RS-Jr, OF)
- Jose Gonzalez (TXST, Jr, OF)
- John Wuthrich (TXST, Sr, OF)
- Rigsby Mosley (TROY, Sr, UT)
- Tyler Johnson (CCU, Sr, DH)
