= 2022 Coastal Carolina Chanticleers baseball team =

American college baseball season

2022 Coastal Carolina Chanticleers baseball

Greenville Regional, 3–2
- Conference: Sun Belt Conference
- Record: 39–20–1 (21–8–1 SBC)
- Head coach: Gary Gilmore (27th season)
- Assistant coaches: Kevin Schnall (19th season); Jason Beverlin (1st season); Matt Schilling (15th season)
- Home stadium: Springs Brooks Stadium

2022 Sun Belt Conference baseball standings
	Conf.						Overall
Team	W		L		T	PCT	W		L		T	PCT
No. 13 Texas State ‍†‍‍^{y}	26	–	4	–	0	.867	47	–	14	–	0	.770
No. 21 Georgia Southern ‍‍‍^{y}	23	–	7	–	0	.767	41	–	20	–	0	.672
Coastal Carolina ‍‍‍^{y}	21	–	8	–	1	.717	39	–	20	–	1	.658
Louisiana ‍‍‡‍^{y}	19	–	11	–	0	.633	37	–	23	–	0	.617
South Alabama ‍‍‍	17	–	13	–	0	.567	31	–	23	–	0	.574
Troy ‍‍‍	15	–	15	–	0	.500	32	–	24	–	0	.571
Georgia State ‍‍‍	15	–	15	–	0	.500	30	–	27	–	0	.526
Little Rock ‍‍‍	11	–	18	–	0	.379	24	–	27	–	0	.471
Appalachian State ‍‍‍	10	–	20	–	0	.333	20	–	33	–	0	.377
Louisiana–Monroe ‍‍‍	9	–	20	–	1	.317	20	–	35	–	1	.366
UT Arlington ‍‍‍	7	–	23	–	0	.233	15	–	39	–	0	.278
Arkansas State ‍‍‍	5	–	24	–	0	.172	11	–	38	–	0	.224
† – Conference champion ‡ – Tournament champion y – Invited to the NCAA tournament Rankings from D1Baseball

The 2022 Coastal Carolina Chanticleers baseball team represented Coastal Carolina University during the 2022 NCAA Division I baseball season. The Chanticleers played their home games at Springs Brooks Stadium and were led by twenty-seventh year head coach Gary Gilmore. They were members of the Sun Belt Conference.

== Preseason ==
=== Sun Belt Conference Coaches Poll ===
The Sun Belt Conference Coaches Poll was released on February 9, 2022. Coastal Carolina was picked to finish tied for third with Louisiana with 117 votes and 3 first place votes.

Coaches poll
Predicted finish	Team	Votes (1st place)
1	South Alabama	139 (7)
2	Georgia Southern	118
T3	Coastal Carolina	117 (3)
T3	Louisiana	117 (2)
5	UT Arlington	78
6	Troy	74
7	Texas State	71
8	Little Rock	63
9	Louisiana–Monroe	59
10	Appalachian State	38
11	Georgia State	34
12	Arkansas State	28

=== Preseason All-Sun Belt Team & Honors ===
Preseason Player of the Year Eric Brown (CCU, Jr, Shortstop)

Preseason Team

- Miles Smith (USA, Sr, Pitcher)
- Hayden Arnold (LR, Sr, Pitcher)
- Tyler Tuthill (APP, Jr, Pitcher)
- Brandon Talley (LA, Sr, Pitcher)
- Caleb Bartolero (TROY, Jr, Catcher)
- Jason Swan (GASO, Sr, 1st Base)
- Luke Drumheller (APP, Jr, 2nd Base)
- Eric Brown (CCU, Jr, Shortstop)
- Ben Klutts (ARST, Sr, 3rd Base)
- Christian Avant (GASO, Sr, Outfielder)
- Josh Smith (GSU, Jr, Outfielder)
- Rigsby Mosley (TROY, Sr, Outfielder)
- Cameron Jones (GSU, So, Utility)
- Noah Ledford (GASO, Jr, Designated Hitter)

== Personnel ==
2022 Coastal Carolina Chanticleers baseball team
Players
Coaches

#	Pos.	Name	B/T	Height	Weight	Year	Home town
1	INF	Dale Thomas	R/R	5 ft 10 in (1.78 m)	170 lb (77 kg)	Jr	De Leon Springs, Florida
2	RHP	Jack Billings	L/R	5 ft 11 in (1.8 m)	245 lb (111 kg)	Sr	Voorhees, New Jersey
3	INF	Ernesto Polanco	R/R	6 ft 0 in (1.83 m)	195 lb (88 kg)	Fr	West New York, New Jersey
6	INF	Nick Lucky	L/R	6 ft 0 in (1.83 m)	190 lb (86 kg)	Sr	Denver, Pennsylvania
7	INF	Cooper Weiss	R/R	5 ft 10 in (1.78 m)	190 lb (86 kg)	Jr	Fort Myers, Florida
8	RHP	Michael Knorr	R/R	6 ft 5 in (1.96 m)	245 lb (111 kg)	Sr	Carlsbad, California
10	OF	Billy Underwood	R/L	6 ft 0 in (1.83 m)	190 lb (86 kg)	So	St. Louis, Missouri
11	RHP	Teddy Sharkey	R/R	5 ft 11 in (1.8 m)	200 lb (91 kg)	So	Wall, New Jersey
12	LHP	Jonathan Blackwell	L/L	6 ft 1 in (1.85 m)	210 lb (95 kg)	Jr	Charleston, West Virginia
13	RHP	John Kelly	R/R	5 ft 10 in (1.78 m)	190 lb (86 kg)	Sr	Rutherford, New Jersey
16	INF	Zack Beach	L/R	6 ft 3 in (1.91 m)	225 lb (102 kg)	Jr	Mechanicsville, Virginia
17	INF	Matt McDermott	R/R	5 ft 9 in (1.75 m)	180 lb (82 kg)	Sr	Little Falls, New Jersey
18	RHP	Keaton Hopwood	R/R	6 ft 0 in (1.83 m)	195 lb (88 kg)	So	Wilmington, Illinois
19	RHP	Elliot Carney	R/R	6 ft 3 in (1.91 m)	210 lb (95 kg)	Sr	Sammamish, Washington
20	INF	Eric Brown	R/R	5 ft 10 in (1.78 m)	190 lb (86 kg)	Jr	Bossier City, Louisiana
21	OF	Austin White	L/L	5 ft 11 in (1.8 m)	165 lb (75 kg)	Sr	Portland, Connecticut
22	OF	Graham Brown	R/R	6 ft 0 in (1.83 m)	180 lb (82 kg)	Jr	Middletown, Maryland
23	INF	Christopher Rowan Jr. (redshirt)	R/R	6 ft 0 in (1.83 m)	220 lb (100 kg)	Sr	Ogden, Utah
24	C	Clay Wargo (redshirt)	R/R	5 ft 10 in (1.78 m)	200 lb (91 kg)	Fr	Huntingtown, Maryland
25	INF	Orlando Pena	R/R	6 ft 1 in (1.85 m)	210 lb (95 kg)	Fr	Jersey City, New Jersey
26	RHP	Riley Eikhoff (redshirt)	R/R	6 ft 0 in (1.83 m)	180 lb (82 kg)	Fr	Bristow, Virginia
27	C	Tanner Garrison	R/R	6 ft 2 in (1.88 m)	215 lb (98 kg)	Jr	Elgin, South Carolina
29	RHP	Matthew Potok	R/R	6 ft 4 in (1.93 m)	220 lb (100 kg)	Fr	Jackson, New Jersey
30	OF	Tyler Johnson	L/L	6 ft 0 in (1.83 m)	220 lb (100 kg)	Sr	Bentonville, Arkansas
31	RHP	Will Smith (redshirt)	R/R	6 ft 0 in (1.83 m)	190 lb (86 kg)	So	Conway, South Carolina
32	C	Kameron Guangorena (redshirt)	L/R	6 ft 0 in (1.83 m)	190 lb (86 kg)	Jr	Whittier, California
35	RHP	Jacob Martin (redshirt)	R/R	6 ft 1 in (1.85 m)	195 lb (88 kg)	Jr	Chatham, Illinois
36	INF	Chase Hudson (redshirt)	R/R	5 ft 10 in (1.78 m)	180 lb (82 kg)	Jr	Myrtle Beach, South Carolina
37	RHP	Nick Parker	R/R	5 ft 11 in (1.8 m)	190 lb (86 kg)	Sr	York, Pennsylvania
38	LHP	Reid VanScoter (redshirt)	L/L	6 ft 0 in (1.83 m)	190 lb (86 kg)	Sr	Livonia, New York
39	RHP	Darin Horn	R/R	6 ft 4 in (1.93 m)	165 lb (75 kg)	Fr	Bluffton, South Carolina
40	RHP	Reece Mainiscalco	R/R	6 ft 0 in (1.83 m)	190 lb (86 kg)	Sr	Fairfield, Connecticut
41	RHP	Colin Yablonski (redshirt)	R/R	6 ft 3 in (1.91 m)	190 lb (86 kg)	So	Lancaster, Pennsylvania
43	RHP	Matt Joyce	R/R	5 ft 10 in (1.78 m)	190 lb (86 kg)	So	Braintree, Massachusetts
44	RHP	Luke Barrow	R/R	6 ft 1 in (1.85 m)	190 lb (86 kg)	So	Oak Ridge, North Carolina
49	RHP	Connor Kurki	R/R	6 ft 2 in (1.88 m)	190 lb (86 kg)	So	Iola, Wisconsin
53	INF	Derek Bender	R/R	6 ft 0 in (1.83 m)	205 lb (93 kg)	Fr	Murrells Inlet, South Carolina

Head coach

Garry Gilmore (Coastal Carolina)

Assistant coach(es)

Kevin Schnall (Coastal Carolina)
Jason Beverlin (Western Carolina)
Matt Schilling (Coastal Carolina)

Legend

- (C) Team captain
- (S) Suspended
- (I) Ineligible
- Injured
- Current redshirt

Roster
Last update: 2 June 2022

== Schedule and results ==
Legend
	Coastal Carolina win
	Coastal Carolina loss
	Postponement/Cancelation/Suspensions
**Bold**	Coastal Carolina team member

2022 Coastal Carolina Chanticleers baseball game log
Regular season (36–17–1)

February (7–1)
Date	Opponent	Rank	Site/stadium	Score	Win	Loss	Save	TV	Attendance	Overall record	SBC record
Baseball at the Beach
Feb. 18	Kent State		Springs Brooks Stadium • Conway, SC	**W** 13–8	**Joyce** (1-0)	Cruikshank (0-1)	**Billings** (1)		2,248	1–0	
Feb. 19	Central Michigan		Springs Brooks Stadium • Conway, SC	**W** 8–4	**Potok** (1-0)	Navarra (0-1)	**Sharkey** (1)		1,837	2–0	
Feb. 20	Kent State		Springs Brooks Stadium • Conway, SC	**L** 1–2	Longwell (1-0)	**Billings** (0-1)	None		1,833	2–1	
Feb. 21	West Virginia		Springs Brooks Stadium • Conway, SC	**W** 9–7	**Maton** (1-0)	Watters (0-1)	**Sharkey** (2)		2,312	3–1	
The Carolinas' Coastline Classic
Feb. 25	Rutgers		Springs Brooks Stadium • Conway, SC	**W** 15–10	**Eikhoff** (1-0)	Fitzpatrick (0-1)	None		2,267	4–1	
Feb. 26	Illinois		Springs Brooks Stadium • Conway, SC	**W** 6–2	**VanScooter** (1-0)	Kutt (0-1)	None		1,610	5–1	
Feb. 27	Ball State		Springs Brooks Stadium • Conway, SC	**W** 7–2^{7}	**Knorr** (1-0)	Johnson (0-1)	None		1,101	6–1	
Feb. 28	Ball State		Springs Brooks Stadium • Conway, SC	**W** 9–6	**Joyce** (2-0)	Klein (0-1)	**Billings** (2)		948	7–1	

March (6–9–1)
Date	Opponent	Rank	Site/stadium	Score	Win	Loss	Save	TV	Attendance	Overall record	SBC record
Mar. 2	at UNC Wilmington		Brooks Field • Wilmington, NC	**L** 4–9	Holjes (2-0)	**Kelly** (0-1)	None		1,171	7–2	
Mar. 4	at No. 24 North Carolina		Boshamer Stadium • Chapel Hill, NC	**L** 3–4	Mott (2-0)	**Billings** (0-2)	None	ACCN+	2,861	7–3	
Mar. 5	at No. 24 North Carolina		Boshamer Stadium • Chapel Hill, NC	**L** 0–4	Gillian (1-0)	**VanScoter** (1-1)	None	ACCN+	2,572	7–4	
Mar. 6	at No. 24 North Carolina		Boshamer Stadium • Chapel Hill, NC	**L** 3–4^{10}	Ollio (1-0)	**Barrow** (0-1)	None	ACCN+	2,651	7–5	
Mar. 8	Wake Forest		Springs Brooks Stadium • Conway, SC	**W** 4–3	**Joyce** (3-0)	McGraw (1-1)	None	ESPN+	1,498	8–5	
Mar. 11	Xavier		Springs Brooks Stadium • Conway, SC	**L** 5–9	Kelly (2-0)	**Sharkey** (0-1)	Flamm (2)	ESPN+	1,056	8–6	
Mar. 12	Xavier		Springs Brooks Stadium • Conway, SC	Game postponed							
Mar. 12	Xavier		Springs Brooks Stadium • Conway, SC	Game cancelled							
Mar. 13	Xavier		Springs Brooks Stadium • Conway, SC	**W** 6–4^{7}	**VanScoter** (2-1)	Eisenhardt (1-3)	**Eikhoff** (1)	ESPN+	1,079	9–6	
Mar. 13	Xavier		Springs Brooks Stadium • Conway, SC	**W** 8–4	**Carney** (1-0)	Barnett (0-3)	None	ESPN+	1,079	10–6	
Mar. 16	at NC State		Doak Field • Raleigh, NC	Game cancelled							
Mar. 18	Louisiana–Monroe		Springs Brooks Stadium • Conway, SC	**L** 2–3	Barlow (2-1)	**Parker** (0-1)	Orton (2)	ESPN+	1,481	10–7	0–1
Mar. 19	Louisiana–Monroe		Springs Brooks Stadium • Conway, SC	**W** 9–4	**VanScooter** (3-1)	Cressend (1-2)	None	ESPN+	1,177	11–7	1–1
Mar. 20	Louisiana–Monroe		Springs Brooks Stadium • Conway, SC	**T** 17–17^{9}				ESPN+	1,370	11–7–1	1–1–1
Mar. 22	at No. 24 Clemson		Doug Kingsmore Stadium • Clemson, SC	**W** 16–7	**Joyce** (4-0)	Barlow (0-2)	None		3,963	12–7–1	
Mar. 25	at No. 20 Texas State		Bobcat Ballpark • San Marcos, TX	**L** 4–7	Dixon (3-0)	**Joyce** (4-1)	Stivors (6)		1,451	12–8–1	1–2–1
Mar. 26	at No. 20 Texas State		Bobcat Ballpark • San Marcos, TX	**W** 7–5	**VanScoter** (4-1)	Wells (3-1)	**Yablonski** (1)		1,608	13–8–1	2–2–1
Mar. 27	at No. 20 Texas State		Bobcat Ballpark • San Marcos, TX	**L** 9–13	Wofford (2-0)	**Maton** (1-1)	Stivors (7)		1,372	13–9–1	2–3–1
Mar. 30	at Wake Forest		David F. Couch Ballpark • Winston-Salem, NC	**L** 4–8	Oxford (1-0)	**Horn** (0-1)	None	ACCN	1,071	13–10–1	

April (12–4)
Date	Opponent	Rank	Site/stadium	Score	Win	Loss	Save	TV	Attendance	Overall record	SBC record
Apr. 1	at Arkansas State		Tomlinson Stadium–Kell Field • Jonesboro, AR	**W** 4–0	**VanScoter** (5-1)	Medlin (0-3)	None		338	14–10–1	3–3–1
Apr. 2	at Arkansas State		Tomlinson Stadium–Kell Field • Jonesboro, AR	**W** 5–4	**Eikhoff** (2-0)	Nash (1-3)	**Carney** (1)		295	15–10–1	4–3–1
Apr. 3	at Arkansas State		Tomlinson Stadium–Kell Field • Jonesboro, AR	**W** 16–8	**Parker** (1-1)	Frederick (0-1)	None		309	16–10–1	5–3–1
Apr. 5	UNC Wilmington		Springs Brooks Stadium • Conway, SC	Game postponed							
Apr. 6	College of Charleston		Springs Brooks Stadium • Conway, SC	**W** 7–2^{7}	**Billings** (1-2)	Smith (1-1)	None		1,621	17–10–1	
Apr. 8	Georgia State		Springs Brooks Stadium • Conway, SC	**L** 8–14	Patel (1-0)	**VanScoter** (5-2)	None	ESPN+	1,333	17–11–1	5–4–1
Apr. 9	Georgia State		Springs Brooks Stadium • Conway, SC	**L** 6–7	Lutz (2-0)	**Maniscalco** (0-1)	Watson (6)	ESPN+	1,444	17–12–1	5–5–1
Apr. 10	Georgia State		Springs Brooks Stadium • Conway, SC	**L** 4–5	Sweatt (1-0)	**Parker** (1-2)	Watson (7)	ESPN+	1,806	17–13–1	5–6–1
Apr. 14	Appalachian State		Springs Brooks Stadium • Conway, SC	**W** 14–3	**VanScoter** (6-2)	Carter (1-3)	None		478	18–13–1	6–6–1
Apr. 15	Appalachian State		Springs Brooks Stadium • Conway, SC	**W** 6–1	**Knorr** (2-0)	Hamilton (1-6)	None		575	19–13–1	7–6–1
Apr. 16	Appalachian State		Springs Brooks Stadium • Conway, SC	**W** 9–3	**Parker** (2-2)	Tujetsch (2-3)	**Carney** (2)		485	20–13–1	8–6–1
Apr. 19	at Charlotte		Robert and Mariam Hayes Stadium • Charlotte, NC	**L** 3–11	Rossi (3-0)	**Billings** (0-3)	None	ESPN+	817	20–14–1	
Apr. 22	UT Arlington		Springs Brooks Stadium • Conway, SC	**W** 4–3	**Maniscalco** (1-1)	Moffat (0-6)	None	ESPN+	1,527	21–14–1	9–6–1
Apr. 23	UT Arlington		Springs Brooks Stadium • Conway, SC	**W** 7–1	**Knorr** (3-0)	Wong (1-4)	None	ESPN+	1,296	22–14–1	10–6–1
Apr. 24	UT Arlington		Springs Brooks Stadium • Conway, SC	**W** 3–2	**Parker** (3-2)	Winquest (1-3)	**Maton** (1)	ESPN+	1,124	23–14–1	11–6–1
Apr. 26	at College of Charleston		CofC Baseball Stadium at Patriots Point • Mount Pleasant, SC	**W** 17–7	**Potok** (2-0)	Smith (1-1)	None		705	24–14–1	
Apr. 29	at No. 24 Georgia Southern		J. I. Clements Stadium • Statesboro, GA	**W** 5–4	**VanScoter** (7-2)	Fisher (2-2)	**Maniscalco** (1)		2,032	25–14–1	12–6–1
Apr. 30	at No. 24 Georgia Southern		J. I. Clements Stadium • Statesboro, GA	**W** 6–4	**Knorr** (4-0)	Paden (5-1)	**Maton** (2)		2,258	26–14–1	13–6–1

May (10–3)
Date	Opponent	Rank	Site/stadium	Score	Win	Loss	Save	TV	Attendance	Overall record	SBC record
May 2	at No. 24 Georgia Southern		J. I. Clements Stadium • Statesboro, GA	**L** 2–3	DiMola (1-0)	**Parker** (3-3)	Madden (1)		1,651	26–15–1	13–7–1
May 3	UNC Wilmington		Springs Brooks Stadium • Conway, SC	**W** 16–1	**Eikhoff** (3-0)	Holjes (2-1)	None		1,208	27–15–1	
May 6	Little Rock		Springs Brooks Stadium • Conway, SC	**W** 15–4	**VanScoter** (8-2)	Arnold (4-5)	None	ESPN+	1,164	28–15–1	14–7–1
May 7	Little Rock		Springs Brooks Stadium • Conway, SC	**W** 9–6^{10}	**Potok** (3-0)	Weatherley (1-2)	None	ESPN+	1,337	29–15–1	15–7–1
May 8	Little Rock		Springs Brooks Stadium • Conway, SC	**W** 19–9^{7}	**Eikhoff** (4-0)	Smallwood (5-4)	**Carney** (3)	ESPN+	1,243	30–15–1	16–7–1
May 11	at UNC Greensboro		UNCG Baseball Stadium • Greensboro, NC	**L** 2–14	Koehn (1-2)	**Sharkey** (0-2)	None		127	30–16–1	
May 13	at Troy		Riddle–Pace Field • Troy, AL	**W** 10–6	**Maniscalco** (2-1)	Gamble (2-4)	None		2,523	31–16–1	17–7–1
May 14	at Troy		Riddle–Pace Field • Troy, AL	**W** 7–3	**Knorr** (5-0)	Fuller (4-3)	**Carney** (4)		2,332	32–16–1	18–7–1
May 15	at Troy		Riddle–Pace Field • Troy, AL	**W** 11–7	**Parker** (4-3)	Stewart (4-4)	**Maton** (3)		2,238	33–16–1	19–7–1
May 17	Clemson		Springs Brooks Stadium • Conway, SC	**W** 17–2	**Potok** (4-0)	Hoffmann (3-6)	None	ESPN+	3,516	34–16–1	
May 19	South Alabama		Springs Brooks Stadium • Conway, SC	**W** 11–2	**VanScoter** (9-2)	Boswell (6-4)	**Maniscalco** (2)	ESPN+	1,303	35–16–1	20–7–1
May 20	South Alabama		Springs Brooks Stadium • Conway, SC	**L** 7–15	Boyd (3-1)	**Carney** (1-1)	None	ESPN+	1,380	35–17–1	20–8–1
May 21	South Alabama		Springs Brooks Stadium • Conway, SC	**W** 13–1^{7}	**Parker** (5-3)	Johnson (4-3)	None	ESPN+	1,191	36–17–1	21–8–1

Postseason (3–3)

SBC Tournament (0–1)
Date	Opponent	(Seed)/Rank	Site/stadium	Score	Win	Loss	Save	TV	Attendance	Overall record	Tournament record
May 27	vs. (6) Troy	(3)	Montgomery Riverwalk Stadium • Montgomery, AL	**L** 4–6	Stewart (5-5)	**Maniscalco** (2-2)	Oates (7)	ESPN+		36–18–1	0–1

NCAA tournament (3–2)
Date	Opponent	(Seed)/Rank	Site/stadium	Score	Win	Loss	Save	TV	Attendance	Overall record	Tournament record
Greenville Regional
Jun. 3	vs. (2) Virginia	(3)	Clark–LeClair Stadium • Greenville, NC	**L** 2–7	Savino (6-6)	**VanScoter** (9–3)	None	ESPN+	4,923	36–19–1	0–1
Jun. 4	vs. (4) Coppin State	(3)	Clark–LeClair Stadium • Greenville, NC	**W** 10–8	**Carney** (2-1)	Nichol (2-3)	None	ESPN+	4,895	37–19–1	1–1
Jun. 4	vs. (2) Virginia	(3)	Clark–LeClair Stadium • Greenville, NC	**W** 7–6	**Maniscalco** (3-2)	Wyatt (0-2)	None	ESPN+	4,929	38–19–1	2–1
Jun. 4	vs. (1)/No. 10 East Carolina	(3)	Clark–LeClair Stadium • Greenville, NC	**W** 9–1	**Parker** (6-3)	Kuchmaner (4-3)	None	ESPN+	5,588	39–19–1	3–1
Jun. 5	vs. (1)/No. 10 East Carolina	(3)	Clark–LeClair Stadium • Greenville, NC	**L** 4–13	Spivey (8-0)	**VanScoter** (9-4)	None	ESPN+	5,326	39–20–1	3–2

Schedule source:

*Rankings are based on the team's current ranking in the D1Baseball poll.

== Greenville Regional ==
Greenville Regional Teams
(1) East Carolina Pirates	(2) Virginia Cavaliers	(3) Coastal Carolina Chanticleers	(4) Coppin State Eagles

First Round
1	No. 10 East Carolina	17
4	Coppin State	1
3	Coastal Carolina	2
2	Virginia	7
Lower round 1
4	Coppin State	8
3	Coastal Carolina	10

Semi-Finals
1	No. 10 East Carolina	4
2	Virginia	2
Lower final
2	Virginia	6
3	Coastal Carolina	7

Finals
3	Coastal Carolina	9	4
1	No. 10 East Carolina	1	13

== Postseason ==
=== Conference Awards ===
- Pitcher of the Year: Reid VanScoter – CCU

All Conference First Team

- Reid VanScoter (CCU, RS-Sr, P)
- Levi Wells (TXST, So, P)
- Zeke Woods (TXST, Jr, P)
- Tristan Stivors (TXST, Sr, RP)
- Julian Brock (LA, So, C)
- Carson Roccaforte (LA, So, 1B)
- Jesse Sherrill (GASO, Jr, 2B)
- Dalton Shuffield (TXST, Sr, SS)
- Justin Thompson (TXST, Sr, 3B)
- Max Ryerson (GSU, Jr, OF)
- Mason Holt (ULM, Sr, OF)
- Miles Simington (USA, Sr, OF)
- Cameron Jones (GSU, So, UT)
- Noah Ledford (GASO, RS-Jr, DH)

All Conference Second Team

- Hayden Arnold (LR, Sr, P)
- Michael Knorr (CCU, Sr, P)
- Matt Boswell (USA, Sr, P)
- Jay Thomspon (GASO, Jr, RP)
- Hayden Cross (APP, Jr, C)
- Jason Swan (GASO, Sr, 1B)
- Erick Orbeta (USA, RS-So, 2B)
- Griffin Cheney (GSU, Gr, SS)
- Dale Thomas (CCU, Jr, 3B)
- Noah Dickerson (LR, RS-Jr, OF)
- Jose Gonzalez (TXST, Jr, OF)
- John Wuthrich (TXST, Sr, OF)
- Rigsby Mosley (TROY, Sr, UT)
- Tyler Johnson (CCU, Sr, DH)

=== National & Regional ===
Accolade	Recipient	Reference
Collegiate Baseball Second Team All-American	Reid VanScoter, P	
NCBWA Second Team All-American	Tyler Johnson, DH	
ABCA First Team All-Region	Reid VanScoter, P	
ABCA Second Team All-Region	Tyler Johnson, DH	
