= Lou St. Amant Field =

Baseball venue in Monroe, Louisiana

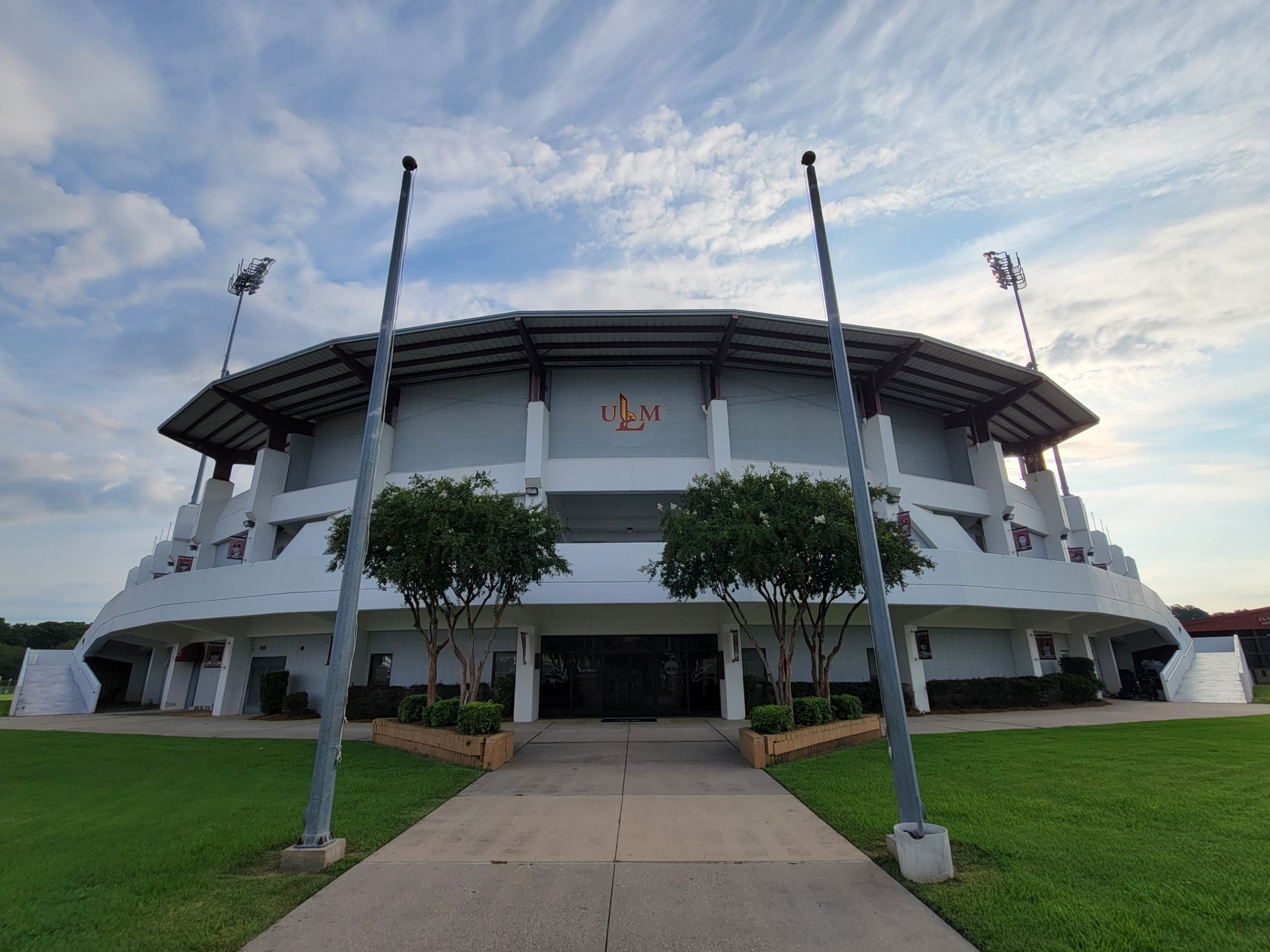
- Interactive map of Lou St. Amant Field
- Former names: Warhawk Field (1983-2023)
- Location: Warhawk Way, Monroe, Louisiana, USA
- Coordinates: 32.532091°N 92.063912°W
- Owner: University of Louisiana at Monroe
- Operator: University of Louisiana at Monroe
- Capacity: 1,800
- Surface: Hybrid bermuda grass
- Scoreboard: Electronic
- Record attendance: 4,635 vs. LSU (4/26/2001)
- Field size: Left Field - 330 ft Left-Center Alley - 375 ft Center Field - 400 ft Right-Center Alley - 375 ft Right Field - 330 ft

Construction
- Opened: 1983
- Renovated: 2008

Tenant
- Louisiana–Monroe Warhawks baseball (1983–present)

Lou St. Amant Field is a baseball venue located in Monroe, in the U.S. state of Louisiana. Located on the campus of the University of Louisiana at Monroe (ULM), it is home to the Louisiana–Monroe Warhawks baseball team of the Division I Sun Belt Conference (SBC). The stadium has a seating capacity of 1,800 spectators.

The stadium was opened in 1983 and was known as Warhawk Field until 2023, when it was renamed for ULM head coach Lou St. Amant, during whose tenure from 1976 to 1993 the park opened.

The field features a hybrid bermuda grass surface, practice facilities, offices, and tailgate areas located down both foul lines.

In 2013, the Warhawks ranked 44th among Division I baseball programs in attendance, averaging 1,439 per home game.

== Gallery ==
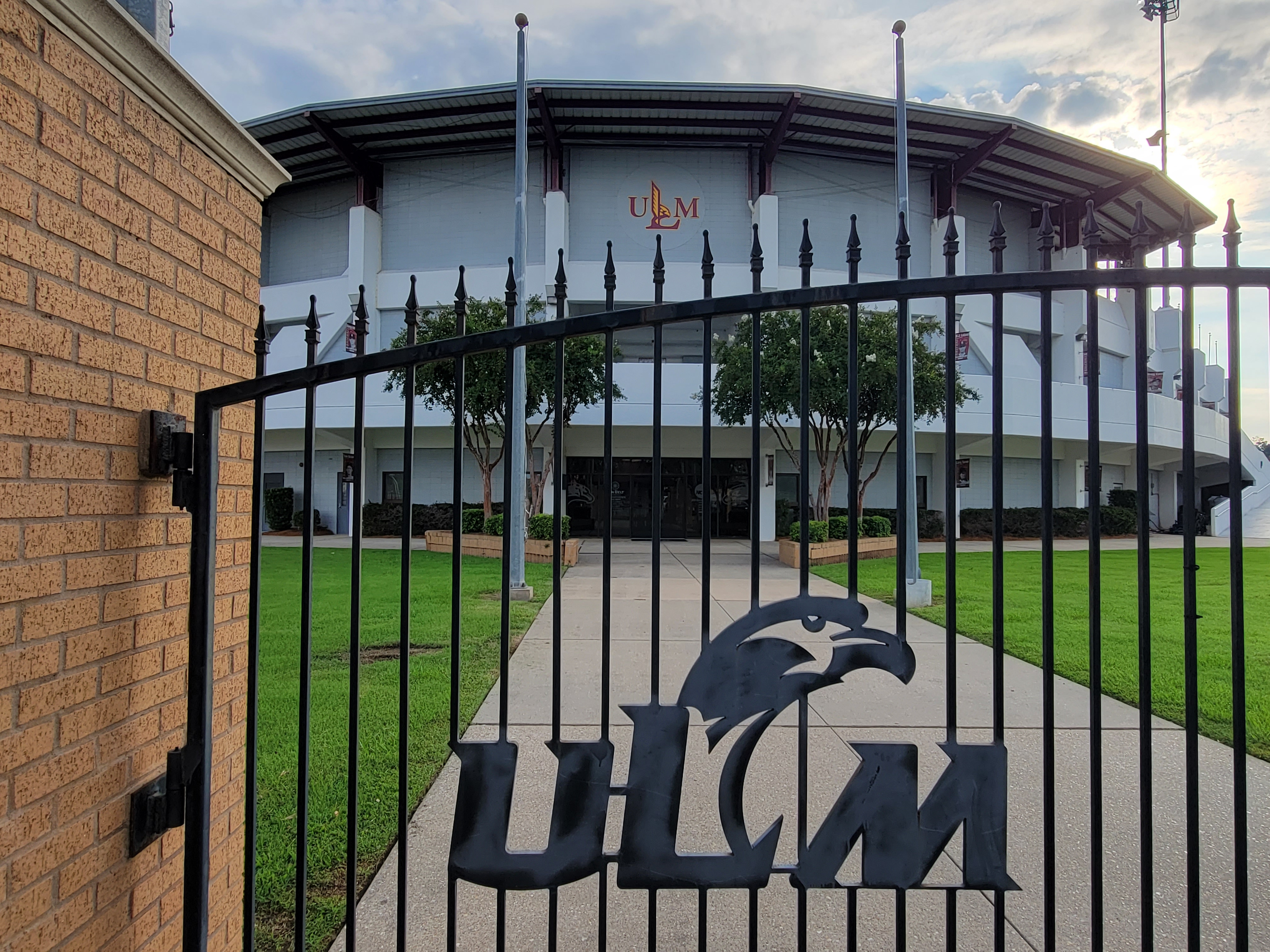
Front gate

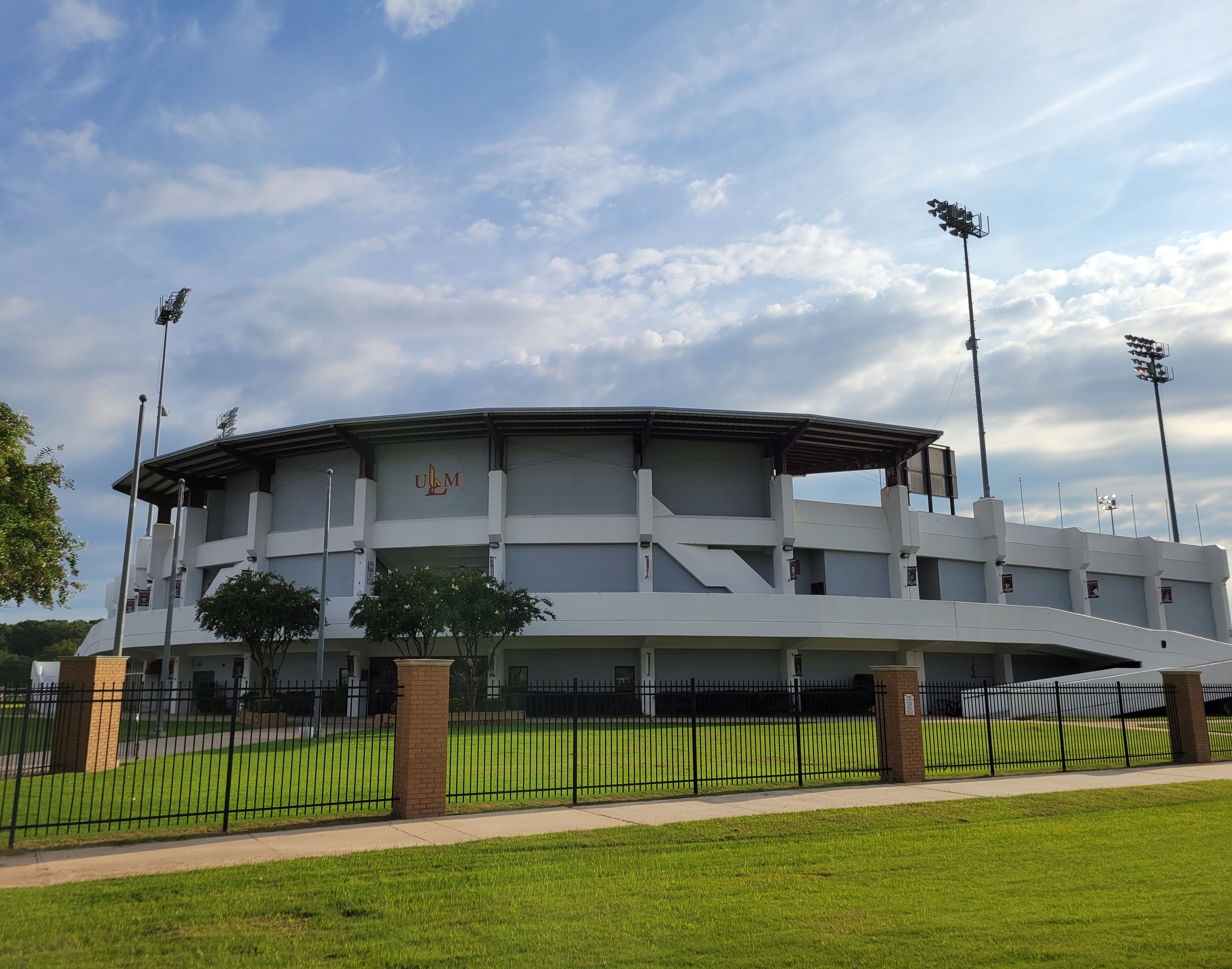
Exterior

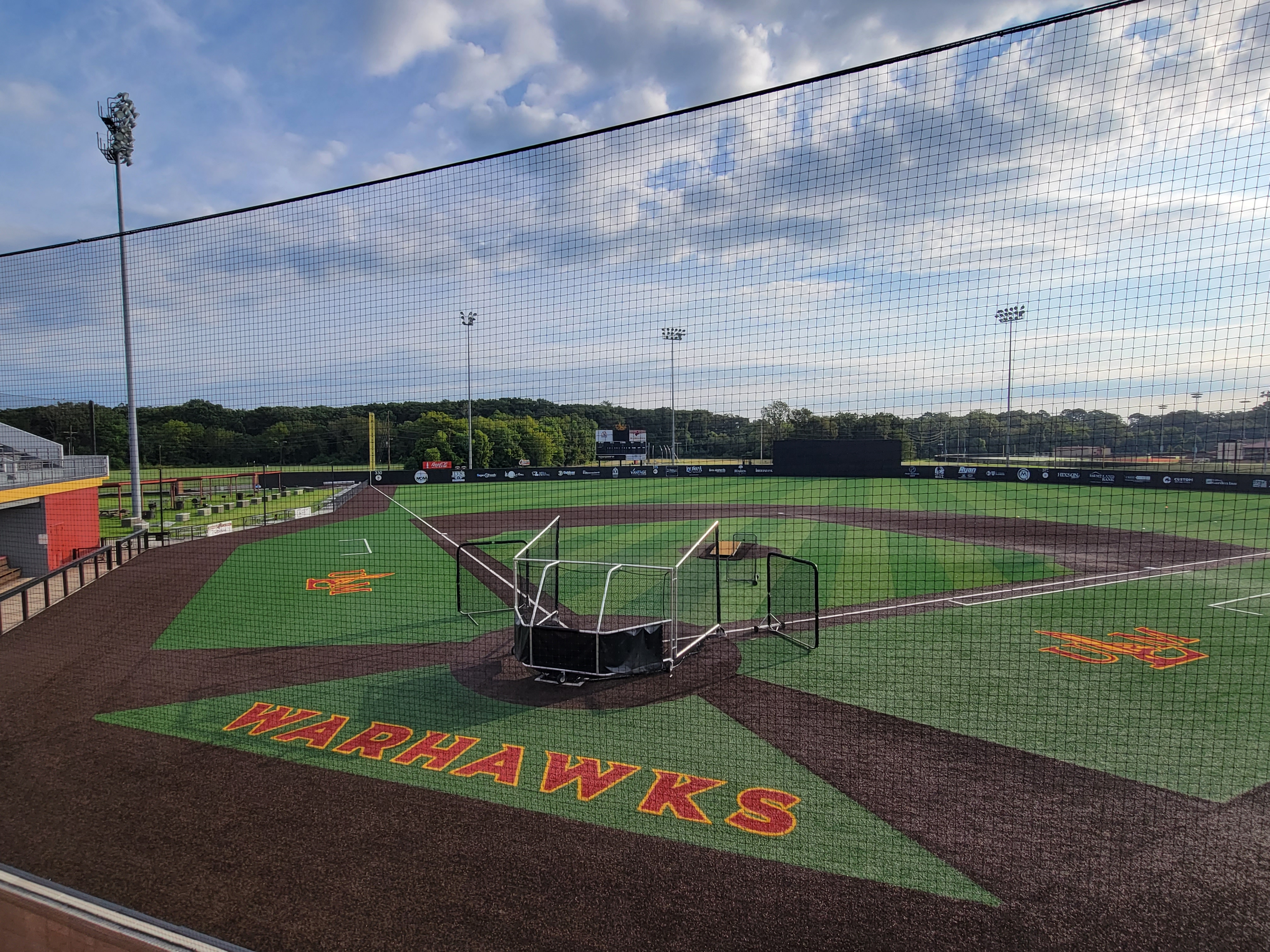
Ball field

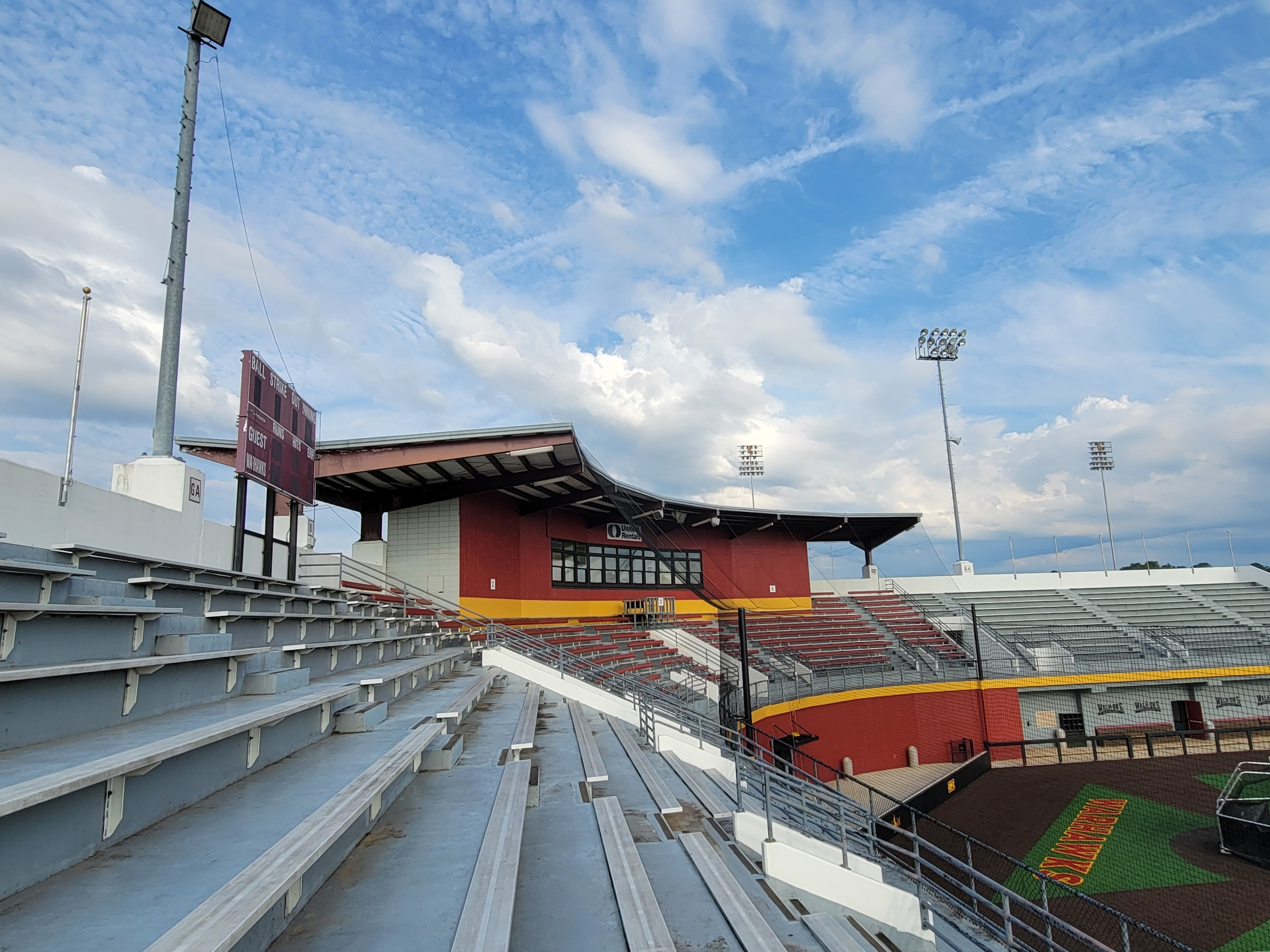
Interior grandstand

== See also ==
- List of NCAA Division I baseball venues
