= 2022 Little Rock Trojans baseball team =

American college baseball season

2022 Little Rock Trojans baseball
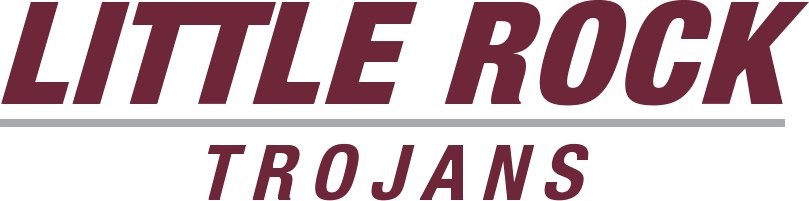
- Conference: Sun Belt Conference
- Record: 24–27 (11–18 SBC)
- Head coach: Chris Curry (8th season)
- Assistant coaches: Noah Sanders; James Leverton
- Home stadium: Gary Hogan Field

2022 Sun Belt Conference baseball standings
	Conf.						Overall
Team	W		L		T	PCT	W		L		T	PCT
No. 13 Texas State ‍†‍‍^{y}	26	–	4	–	0	.867	47	–	14	–	0	.770
No. 21 Georgia Southern ‍‍‍^{y}	23	–	7	–	0	.767	41	–	20	–	0	.672
Coastal Carolina ‍‍‍^{y}	21	–	8	–	1	.717	39	–	20	–	1	.658
Louisiana ‍‍‡‍^{y}	19	–	11	–	0	.633	37	–	23	–	0	.617
South Alabama ‍‍‍	17	–	13	–	0	.567	31	–	23	–	0	.574
Troy ‍‍‍	15	–	15	–	0	.500	32	–	24	–	0	.571
Georgia State ‍‍‍	15	–	15	–	0	.500	30	–	27	–	0	.526
Little Rock ‍‍‍	11	–	18	–	0	.379	24	–	27	–	0	.471
Appalachian State ‍‍‍	10	–	20	–	0	.333	20	–	33	–	0	.377
Louisiana–Monroe ‍‍‍	9	–	20	–	1	.317	20	–	35	–	1	.366
UT Arlington ‍‍‍	7	–	23	–	0	.233	15	–	39	–	0	.278
Arkansas State ‍‍‍	5	–	24	–	0	.172	11	–	38	–	0	.224
† – Conference champion ‡ – Tournament champion y – Invited to the NCAA tournament Rankings from D1Baseball

The 2022 Little Rock Trojans baseball team represented the University of Arkansas at Little Rock during the 2022 NCAA Division I baseball season. The Trojans played their home games at Gary Hogan Field and were led by eighth-year head coach Chris Curry. They were members of the Sun Belt Conference.

== Preseason ==
=== Signing Day Recruits ===
Player	Hometown	Previous Team
Pitchers
Ashton Branson	Mabelvale, Arkansas	Sheridan HS
Hitters
Malcolm Brown	Texarkana, Texas	Redwater HS
Luke Dickerson	Windermere, Florida	Windermere HS
Trey Hill	Fayetteville, Arkansas	Farmington HS
Jordan Kelly	North Little Rock, Arkansas	North Little Rock HS
Ty Rhoades	Jonesboro, Arkansas	Jonesboro HS

=== Sun Belt Conference Coaches Poll ===
The Sun Belt Conference Coaches Poll was released on February 9, 2022. Little Rock was picked to finish eighth with 63 votes.

Coaches poll
Predicted finish	Team	Votes (1st place)
1	South Alabama	139 (7)
2	Georgia Southern	118
T3	Coastal Carolina	117 (3)
T3	Louisiana	117 (2)
5	UT Arlington	78
6	Troy	74
7	Texas State	71
8	Little Rock	63
9	Louisiana–Monroe	59
10	Appalachian State	38
11	Georgia State	34
12	Arkansas State	28

=== Preseason All-Sun Belt Team & Honors ===
- Miles Smith (USA, Sr, Pitcher)
- Hayden Arnold (LR, Sr, Pitcher)
- Tyler Tuthill (APP, Jr, Pitcher)
- Brandon Talley (LA, Sr, Pitcher)
- Caleb Bartolero (TROY, Jr, Catcher)
- Jason Swan (GASO, Sr, 1st Base)
- Luke Drumheller (APP, Jr, 2nd Base)
- Eric Brown (CCU, Jr, Shortstop)
- Ben Klutts (ARST, Sr, 3rd Base)
- Christian Avant (GASO, Sr, Outfielder)
- Josh Smith (GSU, Jr, Outfielder)
- Rigsby Mosley (TROY, Sr, Outfielder)
- Cameron Jones (GSU, So, Utility)
- Noah Ledford (GASO, Jr, Designated Hitter)

== Personnel ==
2022 Little Rock Trojans baseball team
Players
Coaches

#	Pos.	Name	B/T	Height	Weight	Year	Home town
1	INF	Christian Bernabe	R/R	6 ft 0 in (1.83 m)	200 lb (91 kg)	Jr	Deltona, Florida
2	INF	Eldrige Figueroa	R/R	5 ft 8 in (1.73 m)	160 lb (73 kg)	Sr	Carolina, Puerto Rico
4	INF	Noah Burgarello	L/R	5 ft 10 in (1.78 m)	170 lb (77 kg)	So	Glendale, Arizona
5	OF	Miguel Soto	R/R	6 ft 1 in (1.85 m)	205 lb (93 kg)	Sr	Kissimmee, Florida
6	INF	Nathan Lyons	R/R	5 ft 11 in (1.8 m)	180 lb (82 kg)	Sr	Bentonville, Arkansas
7	INF	Jorden Hussein	R/R	6 ft 0 in (1.83 m)	165 lb (75 kg)	Sr	Houston, Texas
8	OF	Noah Dickerson (redshirt)	L/R	6 ft 4 in (1.93 m)	190 lb (86 kg)	Jr	Windermere, Florida
9	C	Jack Stroth	R/R	5 ft 10 in (1.78 m)	200 lb (91 kg)	Jr	Conway, Arkansas
10	RHP	Evan Vanek	R/R	6 ft 4 in (1.93 m)	200 lb (91 kg)	So	McKinney, Texas
12	RHP	Reese Lansville	R/R	5 ft 10 in (1.78 m)	200 lb (91 kg)	Jr	Centennial, Colorado
13	OF	Tyler Williams	R/R	6 ft 3 in (1.91 m)	190 lb (86 kg)	Jr	Lilburn, Georgia
14	INF	Aidan Garrett	L/R	6 ft 0 in (1.83 m)	160 lb (73 kg)	Fr	Benton, Arkansas
16	RHP	Jacob Weatherley	R/R	5 ft 11 in (1.8 m)	165 lb (75 kg)	So	Jonesboro, Arkansas
17	RHP	Tristan Hawkins	R/R	6 ft 3 in (1.91 m)	180 lb (82 kg)	Fr	Benton, Arkansas
18	RHP	Preston Davis	L/R	6 ft 3 in (1.91 m)	230 lb (104 kg)	Fr	Texarkana, Texas
19	RHP	Calvin Hunt	R/R	6 ft 4 in (1.93 m)	195 lb (88 kg)	Jr	Arvada, Colorado
20	INF	Traejon Blake	R/R	6 ft 1 in (1.85 m)	195 lb (88 kg)	Fr	England, Arkansas
21	OF	Andrew Pickering	L/R	6 ft 1 in (1.85 m)	195 lb (88 kg)	Fr	Little Rock, Arkansas
22	LHP	Joey Martin	R/L	6 ft 0 in (1.83 m)	175 lb (79 kg)	Jr	Comfort, Texas
23	C	Jaxson Anderson	L/R	6 ft 2 in (1.88 m)	195 lb (88 kg)	Fr	Greenbrier, Arkansas
24	INF	Canyon McWilliams	L/L	6 ft 1 in (1.85 m)	225 lb (102 kg)	Gr	Shaker Heights, Ohio
25	LHP	Michael Quevedo	L/L	6 ft 0 in (1.83 m)	195 lb (88 kg)	Fr	Deltona, Florida
26	RHP	Ezra Gustafson	R/R	6 ft 0 in (1.83 m)	185 lb (84 kg)	Fr	Midwest City, Oklahoma
28	RHP	Hoss Brewer	R/R	6 ft 4 in (1.93 m)	205 lb (93 kg)	So	Canton, Ohio
29	RHP	Matthew Davis	R/R	6 ft 5 in (1.96 m)	200 lb (91 kg)	So	Selma, Alabama
30	RHP	Hayden Arnold	L/R	6 ft 3 in (1.91 m)	225 lb (102 kg)	Sr	Rison, Arkansas
31	LHP	Chance Vaught	L/L	6 ft 1 in (1.85 m)	180 lb (82 kg)	So	Mobile, Alabama
32	C	Jake Wright	R/R	5 ft 10 in (1.78 m)	190 lb (86 kg)	Jr	Bryant, Arkansas
33	RHP	Austin Stubber	R/R	6 ft 2 in (1.88 m)	200 lb (91 kg)	Jr	Hope, Arkansas
34	LHP	Asher Hastings	L/L	6 ft 0 in (1.83 m)	150 lb (68 kg)	Fr	Little Rock, Arkansas
35	RHP	Zane Neves	L/R	6 ft 0 in (1.83 m)	225 lb (102 kg)	Jr	Jonesboro, Arkansas
36	LHP	Austin Smith	L/L	6 ft 2 in (1.88 m)	195 lb (88 kg)	Sr	Fort Worth, Texas
37	RHP	Erik McKnight	R/R	6 ft 2 in (1.88 m)	210 lb (95 kg)	Jr	Littleton, Colorado
39	LHP	Sawyer Smallwood	L/L	6 ft 3 in (1.91 m)	180 lb (82 kg)	Sr	Texarkana, Texas
40	RHP	Garrett DeHaas	R/R	6 ft 3 in (1.91 m)	250 lb (113 kg)	So	Meno, Oklahoma
41		Cole Somers	R/R	5 ft 10 in (1.78 m)	170 lb (77 kg)	Fr	Little Rock, Arkansas
42		Graydon Martin	R/R	5 ft 9 in (1.75 m)	160 lb (73 kg)	Fr	Texarkana, Arkansas
44	RHP	Cole Evans	R/R	6 ft 5 in (1.96 m)	235 lb (107 kg)	Sr	Liberal, Kansas

Head coach

Chris Curry (Mississippi State)

Assistant coach(es)

Noah Sanders (Arkansas–Monticello)
James Leverton (Texas Tech)
Christian Reyes (Arkansas–Little Rock)

Legend

- (C) Team captain
- (S) Suspended
- (I) Ineligible
- Injured
- Current redshirt

Roster
Last update: 7 June 2022

== Schedule and results ==
Legend
	Little Rock win
	Little Rock loss
	Postponement/Cancelation/Suspensions
**Bold**	Little Rock team member

2022 Little Rock Trojans baseball game log
Regular season (24–26)

February (5–1)
Date	Opponent	Rank	Site/stadium	Score	Win	Loss	Save	TV	Attendance	Overall record	SBC record
Feb. 18	Eastern Illinois		Gary Hogan Field • Little Rock, AR	**L** 0–11	Malatestinic (1-0)	**Arnold** (0-1)	Nicholson (1)		328	0–1	
Feb. 19	Eastern Illinois		Gary Hogan Field • Little Rock, AR	**W** 10–6	**Gustafson** (1-0)	Doherty (0-1)	**Martin** (1)		468	1–1	
Feb. 20	Eastern Illinois		Gary Hogan Field • Little Rock, AR	**W** 11–4	**Smallwood** (1-0)	Birdsong (0-1)	None		358	2–1	
Feb. 25	Western Illinois		Gary Hogan Field • Little Rock, AR	**W** 6–2	**Arnold** (1-1)	Carberry (0-2)	**Davis** (1)			3–1	
Feb. 26	Western Illinois		Gary Hogan Field • Little Rock, AR	**W** 8–3	**Smallwood** (1-0)	Greenan (0-1)	**Brewer** (1)		179	4–1	
Feb. 27	Western Illinois		Gary Hogan Field • Little Rock, AR	**W** 16–1	**McKnight** (1-0)	Fochs (0-1)	None		209	5–1	

March (6–10)
Date	Opponent	Rank	Site/stadium	Score	Win	Loss	Save	TV	Attendance	Overall record	SBC record
Mar. 4	Southern Illinois		Gary Hogan Field • Little Rock, AR	**W** 10–0	**Arnold** (2-1)	Chapman (0-1)	None		337	6–1	
Mar. 5	Southern Illinois		Gary Hogan Field • Little Rock, AR	**L** 6–9	Lewis (2-0)	**Davis** (0-1)	McDaniel (2)		337	6–2	
Mar. 6	Southern Illinois		Gary Hogan Field • Little Rock, AR	**L** 2–5	Hansell (2-0)	**McKnight** (1-1)	Steidl (1)		337	6–3	
Mar. 8	at Central Arkansas		Bear Stadium • Conway, AR	**L** 1–3	Barker (1-2)	**Davis** (0-2)	Shoultz (2)	ESPN+	295	6–4	
Mar. 11	North Alabama		Gary Hogan Field • Little Rock, AR	**W** 5–1	**Arnold** (3-1)	Bradshaw (1-3)	None		121	7–4	
Mar. 12	North Alabama		Gary Hogan Field • Little Rock, AR	**W** 5–4	**Weatherley** (1-0)	Haberstock (1-2)	**Smallwood** (1)		277	8–4	
Mar. 13	North Alabama		Gary Hogan Field • Little Rock, AR	**W** 16–4^{7}	**McKnight** (2-1)	Parish (1-1)	None		153	9–4	
Mar. 13	North Alabama		Gary Hogan Field • Little Rock, AR	**W** 3–2^{7}	**Brewer** (1-0)	Nichols (0-3)	None		157	10–4	
Mar. 16	Oral Roberts		Gary Hogan Field • Little Rock, AR	**L** 3–18^{7}	Ronan (1-0)	**Vaught** (0-1)	None	ESPN+	237	10–5	
Mar. 18	at Georgia State		Georgia State Baseball Complex • Decatur, GA	**L** 3–9	Dow (1-0)	**Arnold** (3-2)	Watson (2)		305	10–6	0–1
Mar. 19	at Georgia State		Georgia State Baseball Complex • Decatur, GA	**L** 4–7	Lutz (1-0)	**Smallwood** (2-1)	Treadway (1)	ESPN+	395	10–7	0–2
Mar. 20	at Georgia State		Georgia State Baseball Complex • Decatur, GA	**L** 8–12	Landry (2-2)	**Vaught** (0-2)	Watson (3)	ESPN+	391	10–8	0–3
Mar. 25	Appalachian State		Gary Hogan Field • Little Rock, AR	**L** 2–5^{14}	LaSpaluto (1-1)	**Smallwood** (2-2)	None	ESPN+	169	10–9	0–4
Mar. 26	Appalachian State		Gary Hogan Field • Little Rock, AR	**W** 7–4	**Vaught** (1-2)	Hamilton (1-3)	**Martin** (2)		136	11–9	1–4
Mar. 27	Appalachian State		Gary Hogan Field • Little Rock, AR	**L** 5–10	Tujetsch (2-0)	**Vaught** (1-3)	None	ESPN+	127	11–10	1–5
Mar. 29	at No. 2 Arkansas		Baum–Walker Stadium • Fayetteville, AR	**L** 8–16	Taylor (2-0)	**Davis** (0-3)	None	SECN+	9,502	11–11	
Mar. 30	at No. 2 Arkansas		Baum–Walker Stadium • Fayetteville, AR	Game cancelled							

April (8–8)
Date	Opponent	Rank	Site/stadium	Score	Win	Loss	Save	TV	Attendance	Overall record	SBC record
Apr. 1	at Troy		Riddle–Pace Field • Troy, AL	**L** 4–5	Stewart (4-1)	**Smallwood** **(2-3)**	None	ESPN+	1,976	11–12	1–6
Apr. 2	at Troy		Riddle–Pace Field • Troy, AL	**W** 4–3	**Vaught** (2-3)	Gamble (0-2)	**Smallwood** (2)	ESPN+	2,153	12–12	2–6
Apr. 3	at Troy		Riddle–Pace Field • Troy, AL	**W** 10–6	**Brewer** (2-0)	Witcher (3-2)	**Weatherley** (1)	ESPN+	1,632	13–12	3–6
Apr. 5	at Arkansas–Pine Bluff		Torii Hunter Baseball Complex • Pine Bluff, AR	Game postponed							
Apr. 8	UT Arlington		Gary Hogan Field • Little Rock, AR	**W** 5–1	**Arnold** (4-2)	King (2-3)	**Smallwood** (3)	ESPN+	132	14–12	4–6
Apr. 9	UT Arlington		Gary Hogan Field • Little Rock, AR	**W** 4–3	**Smallwood** (3-3)	Novis (0-2)	None		292	15–12	5–6
Apr. 10	UT Arlington		Gary Hogan Field • Little Rock, AR	**W** 6–5^{10}	**Davis** (1-0)	Bailey (3-3)	None	ESPN+	353	16–12	6–6
Apr. 12	Central Arkansas		Gary Hogan Field • Little Rock, AR	**L** 5–11	Haley (1-1)	**Davis** (0-4)	None	ESPN+	186	16–13	
Apr. 14	Arkansas State		Gary Hogan Field • Little Rock, AR	**L** 5–6	Anderson (1-3)	**Arnold** (4-3)	Jeans (1)	ESPN+	358	16–14	6–7
Apr. 15	Arkansas State		Gary Hogan Field • Little Rock, AR	**L** 6–7	Jeans (1-4)	**Vaught** (2-4)	None		387	16–15	6–8
Apr. 16	Arkansas State		Gary Hogan Field • Little Rock, AR	Game cancelled							
Apr. 19	at Louisiana Tech		J. C. Love Field at Pat Patterson Park • Ruston, LA	**L** 0–10	Martinez (3-1)	**Brewer** (2-1)	None	CUSA.TV	2,186	16–16	
Apr. 22	at No. 17 Texas State		Bobcat Ballpark • San Marcos, TX	**L** 2–3	Wood (4-1)	**Arnold** (4-4)	Stivors (9)	ESPN+	1,236	16–17	6–9
Apr. 23	at No. 17 Texas State		Bobcat Ballpark • San Marcos, TX	**L** 4–30	Wells (5-1)	**Weatherley** (1-1)	None	ESPN+	1,307	16–18	6–10
Apr. 24	at No. 17 Texas State		Bobcat Ballpark • San Marcos, TX	**L** 2–9	Dixon (7-0)	**Brewer** (2-2)	None	ESPN+	1,176	16–19	6–11
Apr. 27	Louisiana Tech		Gary Hogan Field • Little Rock, AR	**W** 8–7	**Smallwood** (4-3)	Whorff (4-6)	None	ESPN+	115	17–19	
Apr. 29	Louisiana–Monroe		Gary Hogan Field • Little Rock, AR	**W** 4–3	**Smallwood** (5-3)	Wepf (1-4)	**Weatherley** (2)	ESPN+	179	18–19	7–11
Apr. 30	Louisiana–Monroe		Gary Hogan Field • Little Rock, AR	**W** 12–9	**Vaught** (3-4)	Howell (0-2)	**Weatherley** (3)	ESPN+	194	19–19	8–11

May (5–7)
Date	Opponent	Rank	Site/stadium	Score	Win	Loss	Save	TV	Attendance	Overall record	SBC record
May 1	Louisiana–Monroe		Gary Hogan Field • Little Rock, AR	**W** 7–6	**Brewer** (3-2)	Wepf (1-5)	None	ESPN+	297	20–19	9–11
May 3	Arkansas–Pine Bluff		Gary Hogan Field • Little Rock, AR	**W** 11–4	**Quevedo** (1-0)	Niemann (0-1)	None	ESPN+	194	21–19	
May 6	at Coastal Carolina		Springs Brooks Stadium • Conway, SC	**L** 4–15	VanScoter (8-2)	**Arnold** (4-5)	None	ESPN+	1,164	21–20	9–12
May 7	at Coastal Carolina		Springs Brooks Stadium • Conway, SC	**L** 6–9^{10}	Potok (3-0)	**Weatherley** (1-2)	None	ESPN+	1,337	21–21	9–13
May 8	at Coastal Carolina		Springs Brooks Stadium • Conway, SC	**L** 9–19^{7}	Eikhoff (4-0)	**Smallwood** (5-4)	Carney (3)	ESPN+	1,243	21–22	9–14
May 13	Georgia Southern		Gary Hogan Field • Little Rock, AR	**L** 2–13	Fisher (4-2)	**Arnold** (4-6)	None	ESPN+	231	21–23	9–15
May 14	Georgia Southern		Gary Hogan Field • Little Rock, AR	**W** 7–6	**Quevedo** (2-0)	Paden (5-2)	**Smallwood** (4)		281	22–23	10–15
May 15	Georgia Southern		Gary Hogan Field • Little Rock, AR	**L** 6–14^{7}	Thompson (6-3)	**Weatherley** (1-3)	None	ESPN+	176	22–24	10–16
May 17	at Central Arkansas		Bear Stadium • Conway, AR	**W** 9–6	**Smith** (1-0)	Haley (1-3)	**Smallwood** (5)	ESPN+	346	23–24	
May 19	at Louisiana		M. L. Tigue Moore Field at Russo Park • Lafayette, LA	**W** 2–0	**Arnold** (5-6)	Bonds (3-3)	None	ESPN+	3,891	24–24	11–16
May 20	at Louisiana		M. L. Tigue Moore Field at Russo Park • Lafayette, LA	**L** 4–10	Ray (3-2)	**Smallwood** (5-5)	None	ESPN+	4,215	24–25	11–17
May 21	at Louisiana		M. L. Tigue Moore Field at Russo Park • Lafayette, LA	**L** 3–9	Perrin (3-0)	**Quevedo** (2-1)	None	ESPN+	4,080	24–26	11–18

Postseason (0–1)

SBC Tournament (0–1)
Date	Opponent	(Seed)/Rank	Site/stadium	Score	Win	Loss	Save	TV	Attendance	Overall record	Tournament record
May 24	vs. (9) Appalachian State	(8)	Montgomery Riverwalk Stadium • Montgomery, AL	**L** 3–10	Cross (3-1)	**Smallwood** (5-6)	None	ESPN+		24–27	0–1

Schedule source:

*Rankings are based on the team's current ranking in the D1Baseball poll.

== Postseason ==
=== Conference Awards ===
- Player of the Year: Dalton Shuffield – TXST
- Ron Maestri Coach of the Year: Steven Trout – TXST

All Conference First Team

- Reid VanScoter (CCU, RS-Sr, P)
- Levi Wells (TXST, So, P)
- Zeke Woods (TXST, Jr, P)
- Tristan Stivors (TXST, Sr, RP)
- Julian Brock (LA, So, C)
- Carson Roccaforte (LA, So, 1B)
- Jesse Sherrill (GASO, Jr, 2B)
- Dalton Shuffield (TXST, Sr, SS)
- Justin Thompson (TXST, Sr, 3B)
- Max Ryerson (GSU, Jr, OF)
- Mason Holt (ULM, Sr, OF)
- Miles Simington (USA, Sr, OF)
- Cameron Jones (GSU, So, UT)
- Noah Ledford (GASO, RS-Jr, DH)

All Conference Second Team

- Hayden Arnold (LR, Sr, P)
- Michael Knorr (CCU, Sr, P)
- Matt Boswell (USA, Sr, P)
- Jay Thomspon (GASO, Jr, RP)
- Hayden Cross (APP, Jr, C)
- Jason Swan (GASO, Sr, 1B)
- Erick Orbeta (USA, RS-So, 2B)
- Griffin Cheney (GSU, Gr, SS)
- Dale Thomas (CCU, Jr, 3B)
- Noah Dickerson (LR, RS-Jr, OF)
- Jose Gonzalez (TXST, Jr, OF)
- John Wuthrich (TXST, Sr, OF)
- Rigsby Mosley (TROY, Sr, UT)
- Tyler Johnson (CCU, Sr, DH)
