= 2022 Louisiana Ragin' Cajuns baseball team =

American college baseball season

2022 Louisiana Ragin' Cajuns baseball

Sun Belt Conference Tournament champions

College Station Regional, 1–2
- Conference: Sun Belt Conference
- Record: 37–23 (19–11 SBC)
- Head coach: Matt Deggs (3rd season)
- Assistant coaches: Seth Thibodeaux; Jake Wells; Zach Lafleur
- Home stadium: M. L. Tigue Moore Field at Russo Park

2022 Sun Belt Conference baseball standings
	Conf.						Overall
Team	W		L		T	PCT	W		L		T	PCT
No. 13 Texas State ‍†‍‍^{y}	26	–	4	–	0	.867	47	–	14	–	0	.770
No. 21 Georgia Southern ‍‍‍^{y}	23	–	7	–	0	.767	41	–	20	–	0	.672
Coastal Carolina ‍‍‍^{y}	21	–	8	–	1	.717	39	–	20	–	1	.658
Louisiana ‍‍‡‍^{y}	19	–	11	–	0	.633	37	–	23	–	0	.617
South Alabama ‍‍‍	17	–	13	–	0	.567	31	–	23	–	0	.574
Troy ‍‍‍	15	–	15	–	0	.500	32	–	24	–	0	.571
Georgia State ‍‍‍	15	–	15	–	0	.500	30	–	27	–	0	.526
Little Rock ‍‍‍	11	–	18	–	0	.379	24	–	27	–	0	.471
Appalachian State ‍‍‍	10	–	20	–	0	.333	20	–	33	–	0	.377
Louisiana–Monroe ‍‍‍	9	–	20	–	1	.317	20	–	35	–	1	.366
UT Arlington ‍‍‍	7	–	23	–	0	.233	15	–	39	–	0	.278
Arkansas State ‍‍‍	5	–	24	–	0	.172	11	–	38	–	0	.224
† – Conference champion ‡ – Tournament champion y – Invited to the NCAA tournament Rankings from D1Baseball

The 2022 Louisiana Ragin' Cajuns baseball team represented the University of Louisiana at Lafayette during the 2022 NCAA Division I baseball season. The Ragin' Cajuns played their home games at M. L. Tigue Moore Field at Russo Park and were led by third–year head coach Matt Deggs. They were members of the Sun Belt Conference.

== Preseason ==
=== Signing Day Recruits ===
Player	Hometown	Previous Team
Pitchers
Ryan Baron	Lake Charles, Louisiana	St. Louis Catholic HS
Gage Bihm	Opelousas, Louisiana	Hinds CC
Steven Cash	Centreville, Alabama	Bibb County HS
Sam Hill	Laurel, Mississippi	Pearl River CC
Luke McGibboney	St. Amant, Louisiana	LSU-Eunice
Brendon Moody	Iowa, Louisiana	LSU-Eunice
Luke Yuhasz	Lake Charles, Louisiana	Sam Houston HS
Hitters
Jake McCarter	West Chester, Pennsylvania	Bishop Shanahan HS
Caleb Stelly	Baton Rouge, Louisiana	Parkview Baptist HS
Lee Amedee	Gonzales, Louisiana	St. Amant HS
Carson McCoy	St. Albans, West Virginia	St. Albans HS
Landon Williams	Abilene, Texas	Wylie HS

=== Sun Belt Conference Coaches Poll ===
The Sun Belt Conference Coaches Poll was released on February 9, 2022. Louisiana was picked to finish tied for third with Coastal Carolina with 117 votes and 2 first place votes.

Coaches poll
Predicted finish	Team	Votes (1st place)
1	South Alabama	139 (7)
2	Georgia Southern	118
T3	Coastal Carolina	117 (3)
T3	Louisiana	117 (2)
5	UT Arlington	78
6	Troy	74
7	Texas State	71
8	Little Rock	63
9	Louisiana–Monroe	59
10	Appalachian State	38
11	Georgia State	34
12	Arkansas State	28

=== Preseason All-Sun Belt Team & Honors ===
- Miles Smith (USA, Sr, Pitcher)
- Hayden Arnold (LR, Sr, Pitcher)
- Tyler Tuthill (APP, Jr, Pitcher)
- Brandon Talley (LA, Sr, Pitcher)
- Caleb Bartolero (TROY, Jr, Catcher)
- Jason Swan (GASO, Sr, 1st Base)
- Luke Drumheller (APP, Jr, 2nd Base)
- Eric Brown (CCU, Jr, Shortstop)
- Ben Klutts (ARST, Sr, 3rd Base)
- Christian Avant (GASO, Sr, Outfielder)
- Josh Smith (GSU, Jr, Outfielder)
- Rigsby Mosley (TROY, Sr, Outfielder)
- Cameron Jones (GSU, So, Utility)
- Noah Ledford (GASO, Jr, Designated Hitter)

== Personnel ==
2022 Louisiana Ragin' Cajuns baseball team
Players
Coaches

#	Pos.	Name	B/T	Height	Weight	Year	Home town
1	INF	Clint Lasiter	R/R	5 ft 11 in (1.8 m)	185 lb (84 kg)	Fr	Benton, Louisiana
2	RHP	Bo Bonds	R/R	5 ft 11 in (1.8 m)	200 lb (91 kg)	So	Live Oak, Florida
4	C	Julian Brock	R/R	6 ft 3 in (1.91 m)	205 lb (93 kg)	So	Fulshear, Texas
5	LHP	Blake Marshall	L/L	6 ft 0 in (1.83 m)	185 lb (84 kg)	Jr	Mandeville, Louisiana
6	RHP	David Christie	R/R	6 ft 5 in (1.96 m)	205 lb (93 kg)	So	Lafayette, Louisiana
7	OF	Max Marusak	R/R	6 ft 0 in (1.83 m)	185 lb (84 kg)	Jr	Amarillo, Texas
8	OF	Heath Hood	R/R	6 ft 0 in (1.83 m)	190 lb (86 kg)	Jr	White Oak, Texas
9	C	Austin Garrett	R/R	5 ft 11 in (1.8 m)	200 lb (91 kg)	Sr	Tuttle, Oklahoma
10	INF	Andrew Howard (redshirt)	R/R	6 ft 2 in (1.88 m)	200 lb (91 kg)	Fr	Ellisville, Mississippi
11	INF	Bobby Lada	R/R	6 ft 0 in (1.83 m)	180 lb (82 kg)	Jr	Houston, Texas
12	RHP	Hayden Durke	R/R	6 ft 3 in (1.91 m)	205 lb (93 kg)	So	Abbeville, Louisiana
13	OF	Will Veillon	R/R	6 ft 2 in (1.88 m)	205 lb (93 kg)	Jr	Rayne, Louisiana
14	INF	Jonathan Brandon	R/R	5 ft 11 in (1.8 m)	185 lb (84 kg)	Sr	Bossier City, Louisiana
15	RHP	Jacob Schultz	R/R	6 ft 2 in (1.88 m)	195 lb (88 kg)	Sr	Oklahoma City, Oklahoma
16	INF	Mason Zambo	L/R	6 ft 2 in (1.88 m)	215 lb (98 kg)	Fr	Baton Rouge, Louisiana
18	INF	Warnner Rincones	R/R	5 ft 10 in (1.78 m)	195 lb (88 kg)	So	Englewood, Florida
19	LHP	Dylan Theut (redshirt)	R/L	6 ft 0 in (1.83 m)	180 lb (82 kg)	Fr	Fulshear, Texas
20	OF	Tyler Robertson	R/R	6 ft 4 in (1.93 m)	200 lb (91 kg)	Jr	Montgomery, Alabama
21	OF	Connor Kimple	R/R	6 ft 3 in (1.91 m)	205 lb (93 kg)	Sr	Whitefish Bay, Wisconsin
22	OF	Carson Roccaforte	L/L	6 ft 1 in (1.85 m)	195 lb (88 kg)	So	Port Neches, Texas
23	LHP	Brandon Talley	L/L	6 ft 3 in (1.91 m)	225 lb (102 kg)	Sr	Princeton, Texas
24	INF	Kyle DeBarge	R/R	5 ft 9 in (1.75 m)	170 lb (77 kg)	Fr	Kinder, Louisiana
25	INF	Trey Lafleur	L/L	6 ft 3 in (1.91 m)	195 lb (88 kg)	So	Pensacola, Florida
26	OF	Maddox McDonald	R/R	6 ft 0 in (1.83 m)	185 lb (84 kg)	Fr	San Antonio, Texas
27	LHP	Austin Perrin	L/L	5 ft 10 in (1.78 m)	180 lb (82 kg)	Sr	Boutte, Louisiana
32	RHP	Drew Shifflet	R/R	6 ft 0 in (1.83 m)	195 lb (88 kg)	Jr	Nacogdoches, Texas
33	OF	Conor Higgs (redshirt)	L/L	6 ft 2 in (1.88 m)	190 lb (86 kg)	Fr	Texas City, Texas
41	LHP	Chipper Menard	L/L	6 ft 0 in (1.83 m)	180 lb (82 kg)	So	New Iberia, Louisiana
44	INF	CJ Wells	L/R	6 ft 3 in (1.91 m)	195 lb (88 kg)	Jr	Ruston, Louisiana
45	RHP	Bryce Calloway	R/R	6 ft 4 in (1.93 m)	225 lb (102 kg)	Fr	New Orleans, Louisiana
50	RHP	Jake Hammond	R/R	6 ft 3 in (1.91 m)	245 lb (111 kg)	So	Monroe, Louisiana
51	RHP	Jeff Wilson	R/R	6 ft 4 in (1.93 m)	225 lb (102 kg)	Sr	Plano, Texas
52	RHP	Tommy Ray	R/R	6 ft 5 in (1.96 m)	215 lb (98 kg)	So	Quincy, Illinois
53	RHP	Peyton Howard	R/R	6 ft 0 in (1.83 m)	215 lb (98 kg)	So	Bridge City, Texas

Head coach

Matt Deggs (Northwestern State)

Assistant coach(es)

Seth Thibodeaux (William Carey)
Jake Wells (Montevallo)
Zach Lafleur (Louisiana)

Legend

- (C) Team captain
- (S) Suspended
- (I) Ineligible
- Injured
- Current redshirt

Roster
Last update: 22 March 2022

== Schedule and results ==
Legend
	Louisiana win
	Louisiana loss
	Postponement/Cancelation/Suspensions
**Bold**	Louisiana team member

2022 Louisiana Ragin' Cajuns baseball game log
Regular season (33–21)

February (3–4)
Date	Opponent	Rank	Site/stadium	Score	Win	Loss	Save	TV	Attendance	Overall record	SBC record
Feb. 18	No. 20 UC Irvine		M. L. Tigue Moore Field at Russo Park • Lafayette, LA	**L** 4–7	Frias (1-0)	**Talley** (0-1)	King (1)	ESPN+	4,346	0–1	
Feb. 19	No. 20 UC Irvine		M. L. Tigue Moore Field at Russo Park • Lafayette, LA	**W** 7–4	**Schultz** (1-0)	Pinto (0-1)	**Theut** (1)	ESPN+	4,263	1–1	
Feb. 20	No. 20 UC Irvine		M. L. Tigue Moore Field at Russo Park • Lafayette, LA	**W** 5–3	**Bonds** (1-0)	King (0-1)	None	ESPN+	4,186	2–1	
Feb. 22	Southeastern Louisiana		M. L. Tigue Moore Field at Russo Park • Lafayette, LA	**W** 6–5^{10}	**Hammond** (1-0)	Landry (1-1)	None	ESPN+	4,098	3–1	
Karbach Round Rock Classic
Feb. 25	vs. No. 6 Stanford		Dell Diamond • Round Rock, TX	**L** 1–5	Williams (2-0)	**Ray** (0-1)	None			3–2	
Feb. 26	vs. Indiana		Dell Diamond • Round Rock, TX	**L** 4–12	Perkins (1-0)	**Havard** (0-1)	None			3–3	
Feb. 27	vs. No. 2 Arkansas		Dell Diamond • Round Rock, TX	**L** 4–6	Vermillion (1-0)	**Theut** (0-1)	Ramage (3)			3–4	

March (9–9)
Date	Opponent	Rank	Site/stadium	Score	Win	Loss	Save	TV	Attendance	Overall record	SBC record
Mar. 1	at Northwestern State		H. Alvin Brown–C. C. Stroud Field • Natchitoches, LA	**W** 11–8	**Shifflet** (1-0)	Prestwich (0-2)	**Schultz** (1)		580	4–4	
Mar. 2	Northwestern State		M. L. Tigue Moore Field at Russo Park • Lafayette, LA	**W** 6–3	**Havard** (1-1)	Ohnoutka (1-1)	**Schultz** (2)		4,072	5–4	
Mar. 4	Southern Miss		M. L. Tigue Moore Field at Russo Park • Lafayette, LA	**W** 5–3	**Ray** (1-1)	Ethridge (1-1)	**Talley** (1)		4,382	6–4	
Mar. 5	Southern Miss		M. L. Tigue Moore Field at Russo Park • Lafayette, LA	**L** 0–5	Riggins (3-0)	**Theut** (0-2)	None	ESPN+	4,334	6–5	
Mar. 6	Southern Miss		M. L. Tigue Moore Field at Russo Park • Lafayette, LA	**L** 2–4	Ramsey (1-0)	**Bonds** (1-1)	None	ESPN+	4,218	6–6	
Mar. 11	Houston		M. L. Tigue Moore Field at Russo Park • Lafayette, LA	**W** 9–5	**Bonds** (2-1)	Dannelley (0-1)	None	ESPN+	3,935	7–6	
Mar. 12	Houston		M. L. Tigue Moore Field at Russo Park • Lafayette, LA	**L** 4–8	Medrano (2-0)	**Shifflet** (1-1)	Sears (3)	ESPN+	4,116	7–7	
Mar. 13	Houston		M. L. Tigue Moore Field at Russo Park • Lafayette, LA	**W** 10–1	**Wilson** (1-0)	Deese (0-1)	None	ESPN+	4,105	8–7	
Mar. 16	at McNeese State		Joe Miller Ballpark • Lake Charles, LA	**W** 10–8	**Menard** (1-0)	Shadrick (1-1)	**Schultz** (1)	YouTube.TV	1,476	9–7	
Mar. 18	at Troy		Riddle–Pace Field • Troy, AL	**L** 1–7	Gainous (3-1)	**Ray** (1-2)	Gamble (2)	ESPN+	1,532	9–8	0–1
Mar. 19	at Troy		Riddle–Pace Field • Troy, AL	**L** 3–4	Stewart (3-1)	**Schultz** (1-1)	None	ESPN+	1,821	9–9	0–2
Mar. 20	at Troy		Riddle–Pace Field • Troy, AL	**L** 3–8	Witcher (2-1)	**Wilson** (1-1)	Stewart (1)	ESPN+	1,729	9–10	0–3
Mar. 22	at Nicholls		Ben Meyer Diamond at Ray E. Didier Field • Thibodaux, LA	**L** 5–6	Evans (1-0)	**Schultz** (1-2)	None		634	9–11	
Mar. 25	South Alabama		M. L. Tigue Moore Field at Russo Park • Lafayette, LA	**W** 5–4^{11}	**Menard** (2-0)	Wood (0-1)	None		4,065	10–11	1–3
Mar. 26	South Alabama		M. L. Tigue Moore Field at Russo Park • Lafayette, LA	**L** 5–6	Boswell (4-1)	**Schultz** (1-3)	None	ESPN+	4,016	10–12	1–4
Mar. 27	South Alabama		M. L. Tigue Moore Field at Russo Park • Lafayette, LA	**W** 6–3	**Theut** (1-2)	Lin (1-2)	**Menard** (1)		4,408	11–12	2–4
Mar. 29	at Southeastern Louisiana		Pat Kenelly Diamond at Alumni Field • Hammond, LA	**W** 6–4	**Shifflet** (2-1)	Batty (0-1)	**Menard** (2)	ESPN+	1,478	12–12	
Mar. 30	at New Orleans		Maestri Field at Privateer Park • New Orleans, LA	Game postponed							

April (13–4)
Date	Opponent	Rank	Site/stadium	Score	Win	Loss	Save	TV	Attendance	Overall record	SBC record
Apr. 1	Georgia Southern		M. L. Tigue Moore Field at Russo Park • Lafayette, LA	**W** 6–3	**Ray** (2-2)	Thompson (2-1)	**Menard** (3)	ESPN+	4,102	13–12	3–4
Apr. 2	Georgia Southern		M. L. Tigue Moore Field at Russo Park • Lafayette, LA	**L** 3–4	Johnson (2-2)	**Menard** (2-1)	None	ESPN+	4,089	13–13	3–5
Apr. 3	Georgia Southern		M. L. Tigue Moore Field at Russo Park • Lafayette, LA	**W** 5–1	**Wilson** (2-1)	Wray (5-1)	None	ESPN+	3,986	14–13	4–5
Apr. 5	at Louisiana Tech		J. C. Love Field at Pat Patterson Park • Ruston, LA	**L** 3–7	Tomkins (3-0)	**Bonds** (2-2)	Crigger (5)	CUSA.TV	2,439	14–14	
Apr. 6	at Louisiana Tech		J. C. Love Field at Pat Patterson Park • Ruston, LA	**W** 8–6	**Rawls** (1-0)	Whorff (2-5)	None	CUSA.TV	2,606	15–14	
Apr. 8	at Arkansas State		Tomlinson Stadium–Kell Field • Jonesboro, AR	**W** 10–0	**Talley** (1-1)	Medlin (0-4)	None	ESPN+	252	16–14	5–5
Apr. 9	at Arkansas State		Tomlinson Stadium–Kell Field • Jonesboro, AR	**W** 5–3	**Menard** (3-1)	Wiseman (0-2)	None	ESPN+	297	17–14	6–5
Apr. 10	at Arkansas State		Tomlinson Stadium–Kell Field • Jonesboro, AR	**W** 7–4^{10}	**Rawls** (2-0)	Jeans (0-4)	None	ESPN+	255	18–14	7–5
Apr. 12	McNeese State		M. L. Tigue Moore Field at Russo Park • Lafayette, LA	Game cancelled							
Apr. 14	Louisiana–Monroe		M. L. Tigue Moore Field at Russo Park • Lafayette, LA	**W** 14–2	**Talley** (2-1)	Barlow (2-4)	None	ESPN+	4,037	19–14	8–5
Apr. 15	Louisiana–Monroe		M. L. Tigue Moore Field at Russo Park • Lafayette, LA	**L** 5–7	Judice (1-0)	**Rawls** (2-1)	Orton (4)		4,042	19–15	8–6
Apr. 16	Louisiana–Monroe		M. L. Tigue Moore Field at Russo Park • Lafayette, LA	**W** 7–1	**Wilson** (3-1)	Wepf (1-3)	None		4,170	20–15	9–6
Wally Pontiff Jr. Classic
Apr. 19	at No. 22 LSU		Alex Box Stadium, Skip Bertman Field • Baton Rouge, LA	**L** 4–8	Floyd (4-2)	**Talley** (2-2)	Reyzelman (2)	SECN+	6,789	20–16	
Apr. 22	at Georgia State		Georgia State Baseball Complex • Decatur, GA	**W** 5–4	**Hammond** (2-0)	Jones (2-3)	None		347	21–16	10–6
Apr. 23	at Georgia State		Georgia State Baseball Complex • Decatur, GA	**W** 6–3	**Schultz** (2-3)	Dawson (2-4)	None		378	22–16	11–6
Apr. 24	at Georgia State		Georgia State Baseball Complex • Decatur, GA	**W** 14–2^{7}	**Wilson** (4-1)	Landry (2-3)	None		367	23–16	12–6
Apr. 29	at Appalachian State		Beaver Field at Jim and Bettie Smith Stadium • Boone, NC	**W** 14–3	**Talley** (3-2)	Tuthill (1-5)	None		310	24–16	13–6
Apr. 30	at Appalachian State		Beaver Field at Jim and Bettie Smith Stadium • Boone, NC	**W** 12–7	**Perrin** (1-0)	Tujetsch (3-4)	None		552	25–16	14–6

May (8–5)
Date	Opponent	Rank	Site/stadium	Score	Win	Loss	Save	TV	Attendance	Overall record	SBC record
May 1	at Appalachian State		Beaver Field at Jim and Bettie Smith Stadium • Boone, NC	**L** 4–9	Cornatzer (2-1)	**Wilson** (4-2)	Carter (1)		135	25–17	14–7
May 6	UT Arlington		M. L. Tigue Moore Field at Russo Park • Lafayette, LA	**W** 4–3	**Bonds** (3-2)	Moffat (2-7)	None	ESPN+	4,149	26–17	15–7
May 7	UT Arlington		M. L. Tigue Moore Field at Russo Park • Lafayette, LA	**W** 4–3	**Schultz** (3-3)	Wong (1-5)	**Hammond** (1)		4,177	27–17	16–7
May 8	UT Arlington		M. L. Tigue Moore Field at Russo Park • Lafayette, LA	**W** 6–5^{11}	**Christie** (1-0)	Moffat (2-8)	None		4,054	28–17	17–7
May 10	at Rice		Reckling Park • Houston, TX	**W** 7–3	**Perrin** (2-0)	Cienfuegos (0-3)	None	CUSA.TV	1,943	29–17	
May 11	at Rice		Reckling Park • Houston, TX	**W** 16–6^{8}	**Menard** (4-1)	Smith (1-3)	None	CUSA.TV	1,935	30–17	
May 13	at No. 15 Texas State		Bobcat Ballpark • San Marcos, TX	**L** 5–7	Wood (6-1)	**Talley** (3-3)	Stivors (13)	ESPN+	1,656	30–18	17–8
May 14	at No. 15 Texas State		Bobcat Ballpark • San Marcos, TX	**L** 4–6	Bush (2-2)	**Hammond** (2-1)	Stivors (14)	ESPN+	1,487	30–19	17–9
May 15	at No. 15 Texas State		Bobcat Ballpark • San Marcos, TX	**L** 9–11	Robie (3-0)	**Wilson** (4-3)	Stivors (15)	ESPN+	1,296	30–20	17–10
May 17	Nicholls		M. L. Tigue Moore Field at Russo Park • Lafayette, LA	**W** 6–1	**Menard** (5-1)	Galy (0-2)	None	ESPN+	4,052	31–20	
May 19	Little Rock		M. L. Tigue Moore Field at Russo Park • Lafayette, LA	**L** 0–2	Arnold (5-6)	**Bonds** (3-3)	None	ESPN+	3,891	31–21	17–11
May 20	Little Rock		M. L. Tigue Moore Field at Russo Park • Lafayette, LA	**W** 10–4	**Ray** (3-2)	Smallwood (5-5)	None	ESPN+	4,215	32–21	18–11
May 21	Little Rock		M. L. Tigue Moore Field at Russo Park • Lafayette, LA	**W** 9–3	**Perrin** (3-0)	Quevedo (2-1)	None	ESPN+	4,080	33–21	19–11

Postseason (4–2)

SBC Tournament (3–0)
Date	Opponent	(Seed)/Rank	Site/stadium	Score	Win	Loss	Save	TV	Attendance	Overall record	Tournament record
May 27	vs. (5) South Alabama	(4)	Montgomery Riverwalk Stadium • Montgomery, AL	**W** 9–1	**Bonds** (4-3)	Boswell (6-5)	**Theut** (2)	ESPN+		34–21	1–0
May 28	vs. (1)/No. 11 Texas State	(4)	Montgomery Riverwalk Stadium • Montgomery, AL	**W** 3–2	**Schultz** (4-3)	Wells (7-2)	None	ESPN+		35–21	2–0
May 29	vs. (2) Georgia Southern	(4)	Montgomery Riverwalk Stadium • Montgomery, AL	**W** 7–6	**Hammond** (3-1)	Higgins (2-3)	**Talley** (2)	ESPN+		36–21	3–0

NCAA tournament (1–2)
Date	Opponent	(Seed)/Rank	Site/stadium	Score	Win	Loss	Save	TV	Attendance	Overall record	Tournament record
College Station Regional
Jun. 3	vs. (2)/No. 22 TCU	(3)	Olsen Field at Blue Bell Park • College Station, TX	**W** 7–6	**Bonds** (5-3)	Cornelio (4-5)	None	ESPN+	6,138	37–21	1–0
Jun. 4	vs. (1)/No. 5 Texas A&M	(3)	Olsen Field at Blue Bell Park • College Station, TX	**L** 6–9	Palisch (5-3)	**Ray** (3-3)	Rudis (3)	ESPN+	6,675	37–22	1–1
Jun. 5	vs. (2)/No. 22 TCU	(3)	Olsen Field at Blue Bell Park • College Station, TX	**L** 1–6	Brown (5-3)	**Wilson** (4-4)	None	ESPN+	6,115	37–23	1–2

Schedule source:

*Rankings are based on the team's current ranking in the D1Baseball poll.

== College Station Regional ==
College Station Regional Teams
(1) Texas A&M Aggies	(2) TCU Horned Frogs	(3) Louisiana Ragin' Cajuns	(4) Oral Roberts Golden Eagles

First Round
1	No. 5 Texas A&M	8
4	Oral Roberts	2
3	Louisiana	7
2	No. 22 TCU	6
Lower round 1
4	Oral Roberts	1
2	No. 22 TCU	3

Semi-Finals
1	No. 5 Texas A&M	9
3	Louisiana	6
Lower final
2	No. 22 TCU	6
3	Louisiana	1

Finals
2	No. 22 TCU	9	-
1	No. 5 Texas A&M	15	-

== Postseason ==
=== Conference Awards ===
All Conference First Team

- Reid VanScoter (CCU, RS-Sr, P)
- Levi Wells (TXST, So, P)
- Zeke Woods (TXST, Jr, P)
- Tristan Stivors (TXST, Sr, RP)
- Julian Brock (LA, So, C)
- Carson Roccaforte (LA, So, 1B)
- Jesse Sherrill (GASO, Jr, 2B)
- Dalton Shuffield (TXST, Sr, SS)
- Justin Thompson (TXST, Sr, 3B)
- Max Ryerson (GSU, Jr, OF)
- Mason Holt (ULM, Sr, OF)
- Miles Simington (USA, Sr, OF)
- Cameron Jones (GSU, So, UT)
- Noah Ledford (GASO, RS-Jr, DH)

All Conference Second Team

- Hayden Arnold (LR, Sr, P)
- Michael Knorr (CCU, Sr, P)
- Matt Boswell (USA, Sr, P)
- Jay Thomspon (GASO, Jr, RP)
- Hayden Cross (APP, Jr, C)
- Jason Swan (GASO, Sr, 1B)
- Erick Orbeta (USA, RS-So, 2B)
- Griffin Cheney (GSU, Gr, SS)
- Dale Thomas (CCU, Jr, 3B)
- Noah Dickerson (LR, RS-Jr, OF)
- Jose Gonzalez (TXST, Jr, OF)
- John Wuthrich (TXST, Sr, OF)
- Rigsby Mosley (TROY, Sr, UT)
- Tyler Johnson (CCU, Sr, DH)

=== National & Regional ===
Accolade	Recipient	Reference
ABCA First Team All-Region	Carson Roccaforte, INF	
