= 2022 Georgia State Panthers baseball team =

American college baseball season

2022 Georgia State Panthers baseball
- Conference: Sun Belt Conference
- Record: 30–27 (15–15 SBC)
- Head coach: Brad Stromdahl (3rd season)
- Assistant coaches: Matt Taylor; Lars Davis; Niko Buentello
- Home stadium: Georgia State Baseball Complex

2022 Sun Belt Conference baseball standings
	Conf.						Overall
Team	W		L		T	PCT	W		L		T	PCT
No. 13 Texas State ‍†‍‍^{y}	26	–	4	–	0	.867	47	–	14	–	0	.770
No. 21 Georgia Southern ‍‍‍^{y}	23	–	7	–	0	.767	41	–	20	–	0	.672
Coastal Carolina ‍‍‍^{y}	21	–	8	–	1	.717	39	–	20	–	1	.658
Louisiana ‍‍‡‍^{y}	19	–	11	–	0	.633	37	–	23	–	0	.617
South Alabama ‍‍‍	17	–	13	–	0	.567	31	–	23	–	0	.574
Troy ‍‍‍	15	–	15	–	0	.500	32	–	24	–	0	.571
Georgia State ‍‍‍	15	–	15	–	0	.500	30	–	27	–	0	.526
Little Rock ‍‍‍	11	–	18	–	0	.379	24	–	27	–	0	.471
Appalachian State ‍‍‍	10	–	20	–	0	.333	20	–	33	–	0	.377
Louisiana–Monroe ‍‍‍	9	–	20	–	1	.317	20	–	35	–	1	.366
UT Arlington ‍‍‍	7	–	23	–	0	.233	15	–	39	–	0	.278
Arkansas State ‍‍‍	5	–	24	–	0	.172	11	–	38	–	0	.224
† – Conference champion ‡ – Tournament champion y – Invited to the NCAA tournament Rankings from D1Baseball

The 2022 Georgia State Panthers baseball team represented Georgia State University during the 2022 NCAA Division I baseball season. The Panthers played their home games at Georgia State Baseball Complex and were led by third-year head coach Brad Stromdahl. They were members of the Sun Belt Conference.

== Preseason ==
=== Sun Belt Conference Coaches Poll ===
The Sun Belt Conference Coaches Poll was released on February 9, 2022. Georgia State was picked to finish eleventh with 34 votes.

Coaches poll
Predicted finish	Team	Votes (1st place)
1	South Alabama	139 (7)
2	Georgia Southern	118
T3	Coastal Carolina	117 (3)
T3	Louisiana	117 (2)
5	UT Arlington	78
6	Troy	74
7	Texas State	71
8	Little Rock	63
9	Louisiana–Monroe	59
10	Appalachian State	38
11	Georgia State	34
12	Arkansas State	28

=== Preseason All-Sun Belt Team & Honors ===
- Miles Smith (USA, Sr, Pitcher)
- Hayden Arnold (LR, Sr, Pitcher)
- Tyler Tuthill (APP, Jr, Pitcher)
- Brandon Talley (LA, Sr, Pitcher)
- Caleb Bartolero (TROY, Jr, Catcher)
- Jason Swan (GASO, Sr, 1st Base)
- Luke Drumheller (APP, Jr, 2nd Base)
- Eric Brown (CCU, Jr, Shortstop)
- Ben Klutts (ARST, Sr, 3rd Base)
- Christian Avant (GASO, Sr, Outfielder)
- Josh Smith (GSU, Jr, Outfielder)
- Rigsby Mosley (TROY, Sr, Outfielder)
- Cameron Jones (GSU, So, Utility)
- Noah Ledford (GASO, Jr, Designated Hitter)

== Personnel ==
2022 Georgia State Panthers baseball team
Players
Coaches

#	Pos.	Name	B/T	Height	Weight	Year	Home town
0	C	Chase Wullenweber	R/R	6 ft 0 in (1.83 m)	190 lb (86 kg)	Gr	West Chester, Ohio
1	LHP	Cameron Jones	R/L	6 ft 1 in (1.85 m)	180 lb (82 kg)	So	Kathleen, Georgia
2	INF	Caleb Stewart	R/R	5 ft 9 in (1.75 m)	185 lb (84 kg)	Fr	Waycross, Georgia
3	OF	Kyle Riesselmann	R/L	6 ft 3 in (1.91 m)	199 lb (90 kg)	So	Tyrone, Georgia
4	LHP	Seth Clark	L/L	6 ft 3 in (1.91 m)	220 lb (100 kg)	Jr	Loganville, Georgia
5	INF	Jesse Donohoe	L/R	6 ft 4 in (1.93 m)	180 lb (82 kg)	Fr	Columbus, Georgia
6	RHP	Micah Earwood	R/R	6 ft 6 in (1.98 m)	205 lb (93 kg)	Fr	Cartersville, Georgia
7	RHP	Joseph Brandon	R/R	6 ft 1 in (1.85 m)	195 lb (88 kg)	Jr	Loganville, Georgia
8	INF	DeAngelo Abboud	R/R	5 ft 9 in (1.75 m)	165 lb (75 kg)	Sr	Lawrenceville, Georgia
9	OF	Dalton Pearson	R/R	5 ft 11 in (1.8 m)	191 lb (87 kg)	So	Johns Creek, Georgia
10	INF	Luke Boynton	R/R	6 ft 6 in (1.98 m)	235 lb (107 kg)	So	Marietta, Georgia
11	OF	Jonathan Ponder	R/R	6 ft 0 in (1.83 m)	180 lb (82 kg)	So	Lawrenceville, Georgia
12	LHP	Dawson Sweatt	L/L	6 ft 3 in (1.91 m)	196 lb (89 kg)	Jr	Fayetteville, Georgia
13	C	Kyle Hilton	R/R	5 ft 11 in (1.8 m)	190 lb (86 kg)	So	Savannah, Georgia
14	INF	Will Maze	R/R	6 ft 4 in (1.93 m)	207 lb (94 kg)	So	Snellville, Georgia
15	C	Blaine Marchman	R/R	6 ft 0 in (1.83 m)	194 lb (88 kg)	So	Loganville, Georgia
16	LHP	Nick Lommen	R/L	6 ft 6 in (1.98 m)	210 lb (95 kg)	So	Minnetonka, Minnesota
17	INF	Dylan Strickland	R/R	6 ft 1 in (1.85 m)	190 lb (86 kg)	So	Loganville, Georgia
18	RHP	Camren Landry	R/R	6 ft 4 in (1.93 m)	185 lb (84 kg)	So	Johns Creek, Georgia
19	INF	Trent Reddick	R/R	6 ft 1 in (1.85 m)	175 lb (79 kg)	Fr	Dallas, Georgia
20	RHP	Chad Treadway	L/R	6 ft 1 in (1.85 m)	210 lb (95 kg)	So	Asheville, North Carolina
21	INF	Griffin Cheney	R/R	5 ft 10 in (1.78 m)	185 lb (84 kg)	Gr	Johns Creek, Georgia
22	RHP	Johnny Dow	R/R	6 ft 5 in (1.96 m)	205 lb (93 kg)	So	Marietta, Georgia
23	OF	Max Ryerson	R/R	6 ft 3 in (1.91 m)	225 lb (102 kg)	Jr	Conway, South Carolina
24	LHP	Brandon Haston	L/L	6 ft 1 in (1.85 m)	175 lb (79 kg)	So	Douglasville, Georgia
25	RHP	Ryan Watson	R/R	6 ft 4 in (1.93 m)	207 lb (94 kg)	Jr	Sugar Hill, Georgia
26	RHP	Trey Horton	L/R	6 ft 2 in (1.88 m)	195 lb (88 kg)	Sr	Acworth, Georgia
27	RHP	Mason Patel	R/R	6 ft 2 in (1.88 m)	190 lb (86 kg)	So	Knoxville, Tennessee
31	RHP	David White	R/R	6 ft 2 in (1.88 m)	195 lb (88 kg)	Fr	Newnan, Georgia
33	RHP	Rafael Acosta	R/R	6 ft 3 in (1.91 m)	215 lb (98 kg)	Jr	San Domingo, Dominican Republic
34	RHP	Chandler Dawson	R/R	6 ft 1 in (1.85 m)	180 lb (82 kg)	So	Warner Robins, Georgia
35	RHP	Jeremiah Newman	R/R	6 ft 0 in (1.83 m)	190 lb (86 kg)	Fr	Atlanta, Georgia
39	RHP	Duncan Lutz	R/R	6 ft 5 in (1.96 m)	197 lb (89 kg)	So	Homerville, Georgia
40	RHP	Dylan Matela (redshirt)	R/R	6 ft 4 in (1.93 m)	215 lb (98 kg)	So	Alpharetta, Georgia
42	OF	JoJo Jackson	R/L	6 ft 4 in (1.93 m)	215 lb (98 kg)	Fr	Stone Mountain, Georgia
44	OF	Josh Smith	R/R	6 ft 5 in (1.96 m)	192 lb (87 kg)	Jr	College Park, Georgia
45	LHP	Brandon Kaminer	L/L	6 ft 3 in (1.91 m)	205 lb (93 kg)	Gr	Coral Springs, Florida
81	INF	Ayden Digiacomo	R/R	6 ft 3 in (1.91 m)	200 lb (91 kg)	Fr	Buford, Georgia
	C	Matt Hoffman	R/R	6 ft 1 in (1.85 m)	180 lb (82 kg)	Fr	Atlanta, Georgia
	C	Colin Hynek	/	6 ft 2 in (1.88 m)	200 lb (91 kg)	Fr	Rockmart, Georgia

Head coach

Brad Stromdahl (Central Michigan)

Assistant coach(es)

Matt Taylor (Columbus State)
Lars Davis (Illinois)
Niko Buentello (Auburn)

Legend

- (C) Team captain
- (S) Suspended
- (I) Ineligible
- Injured
- Current redshirt

Roster
Last update: 3 June 2022

== Schedule and results ==
Legend
	Georgia State win
	Georgia State loss
	Postponement/Cancelation/Suspensions
**Bold**	Georgia State team member

2022 Georgia State Panthers baseball game log
Regular season (30–26)

February (4–4)
Date	Opponent	Rank	Site/stadium	Score	Win	Loss	Save	TV	Attendance	Overall record	SBC record
Feb. 18	Purdue Fort Wayne		Georgia State Baseball Complex • Decatur, GA	**W** 13–2	**Treadway** (1-0)	Miller (0-1)	**Lutz** (1)		372	1–0	
Feb. 19	Purdue Fort Wayne		Georgia State Baseball Complex • Decatur, GA	**W** 12–2	**Dawson** (1-0)	Deany (0-1)	None		395	2–0	
Feb. 19	Purdue Fort Wayne		Georgia State Baseball Complex • Decatur, GA	**W** 6–5	**Clark** (1-0)	Myer (0-1)	None		395	3–0	
Feb. 20	Purdue Fort Wayne		Georgia State Baseball Complex • Decatur, GA	**W** 8–7	**Reddick** (1-0)	Martens (0-1)	**Jones** (1)		385	4–0	
Feb. 23	at Kennesaw State		Fred Stillwell Stadium • Kennesaw, GA	**L** 4–6	Pinson (1-0)	**Landry** (0-1)	Holler (1)	Youtube.TV	485	4–1	
Feb. 25	at No. 15 Florida		Florida Ballpark • Gainesville, FL	**L** 1–4	Barco (2-0)	**Kaminer** (0-1)	Ficarrotta (2)	SECN+	5,571	4–2	
Feb. 26	at No. 15 Florida		Florida Ballpark • Gainesville, FL	**L** 4–13	Purnell (1-0)	**Watson** (0-1)	None	SECN+	6,511	4–3	
Feb. 27	at No. 15 Florida		Florida Ballpark • Gainesville, FL	**L** 1–12	Ficarrotta (2-0)	**Acosta** (0-1)	None	SECN+	5,100	4–4	

March (11–6)
Date	Opponent	Rank	Site/stadium	Score	Win	Loss	Save	TV	Attendance	Overall record	SBC record
Mar. 1	at No. 18 Georgia Tech		Russ Chandler Stadium • Atlanta, GA	**L** 2–4	Grissom, Jr. (1-1)	**Landry** (0-2)	Brown (3)	ESPN+	376	4–5	
Mar. 4	Villanova		Georgia State Baseball Complex • Decatur, GA	**W** 15–0	**Kaminer** (1-1)	Siegenthaler (0-2)	None		321	5–5	
Mar. 5	Villanova		Georgia State Baseball Complex • Decatur, GA	**W** 3–0	**Treadway** (2-0)	Patten (1-2)	Jones (2)		355	6–5	
Mar. 6	Villanova		Georgia State Baseball Complex • Decatur, GA	**W** 8–4	**Watson** (1-1)	Cole (0-1)	None		365	7–5	
Mar. 8	at Wofford		Russell C. King Field • Spartanburg, SC	**W** 4–1	**Landry** (1-2)	Marcoccio (1-2)	**Jones** (3)	ESPN+	127	8–5	
Mar. 11	Presbyterian		Georgia State Baseball Complex • Decatur, GA	**W** 11–6	**Brandon** (1-0)	McDaniel (1-1)	**Watson** (1)		221	9–5	
Mar. 12	Presbyterian		Georgia State Baseball Complex • Decatur, GA	**L** 10–13	Howard (2-1)	**Dawson** (1-1)	Flood (1)		335	9–6	
Mar. 13	Presbyterian		Georgia State Baseball Complex • Decatur, GA	**W** 10–6	**Acosta** (1-1)	Matthews (2-2)	**Jones** (4)		333	10–6	
Mar. 15	at No. 19 Clemson		Doug Kingsmore Stadium • Clemson, SC	**W** 6–1	**Treadway** (3-0)	Barlow (0-1)	None	ACCNX	3,819	11–6	
Mar. 18	Little Rock		Georgia State Baseball Complex • Decatur, GA	**W** 9–3	**Dow** (1-0)	Arnold (3-2)	**Watson** (2)		305	12–6	1–0
Mar. 19	Little Rock		Georgia State Baseball Complex • Decatur, GA	**W** 7–4	**Lutz** (1-0)	Smallwood (2-1)	**Treadway** (1)	ESPN+	395	13–6	2–0
Mar. 20	Little Rock		Georgia State Baseball Complex • Decatur, GA	**W** 12–8	**Landry** (2-2)	Vaught (0-2)	**Watson** (2)	ESPN+	391	14–6	3–0
Mar. 22	vs. No. 17 Georgia		Coolray Field • Lawrenceville, GA	**L** 3–10	Melear (1-0)	**Reddick** (1-1)	None		1,034	14–7	
Mar. 25	at Louisiana–Monroe		Warhawk Field • Monroe, LA	**L** 3–5	Orton (1-0)	**Jones** (0-1)	None	ESPN+	941	14–8	3–1
Mar. 26	at Louisiana–Monroe		Warhawk Field • Monroe, LA	**L** 2–5	Cressend (2-2)	**Dawson** (1-2)	Shaw (1)	ESPN+	1,120	14–9	3–2
Mar. 27	at Louisiana–Monroe		Warhawk Field • Monroe, LA	**W** 8–5	**Treadway** (4-0)	Jans (0-3)	**Jones** (5)		989	15–9	4–2
Mar. 29	at Mercer		OrthoGeorgia Park • Macon, GA	**L** 5–15	Cosper (3-0)	**Matela** (0-1)	None		1,028	15–10	

April (9–9)
Date	Opponent	Rank	Site/stadium	Score	Win	Loss	Save	TV	Attendance	Overall record	SBC record
Apr. 1	South Alabama		Georgia State Baseball Complex • Decatur, GA	**W** 10–8	**Clark** (2-0)	Smith (4-1)	**Watson** (4)		215	16–10	5–2
Apr. 2	South Alabama		Georgia State Baseball Complex • Decatur, GA	**W** 4–3	**Dawson** (2-2)	Boswell (4-2)	**Treadway** (2)	ESPN+	395	17–10	6–2
Apr. 3	South Alabama		Georgia State Baseball Complex • Decatur, GA	**W** 9–5	**Jones** (1-1)	Lehrmann (1-1)	**Watson** (5)	ESPN+	376	18–10	7–2
Apr. 5	Tuskegee		Georgia State Baseball Complex • Decatur, GA	Game postponed							
Apr. 6	Reinhardt		Georgia State Baseball Complex • Decatur, GA	**W** 4–0^{5}	**Brandon** (2-0)	Paulsen (1-3)	None		200	19–10	
Apr. 8	at Coastal Carolina		Springs Brooks Stadium • Conway, SC	**W** 14–8	**Patel** (1-0)	VanScoter (5-2)	None	ESPN+	1,333	20–10	8–2
Apr. 9	at Coastal Carolina		Springs Books Stadium • Conway, SC	**W** 7–6	**Lutz** (2-0)	Maniscalco (0-1)	**Watson** (6)	ESPN+	1,444	21–10	9–2
Apr. 10	at Coastal Carolina		Springs Brooks Stadium • Conway, SC	**W** 5–4	**Sweatt** (1-0)	Parker (1-2)	**Watson** (7)	ESPN+	1,806	22–10	10–2
Apr. 12	Georgia Tech		Georgia State Baseball Complex • Decatur, GA	**W** 9–5	**Matela** (1-1)	Hill (0-1)	None	ACCNX	1,166	23–10	
Apr. 14	at Georgia Southern		J. I. Clements Stadium • Statesboro, GA	**L** 2–4	Thompson (3-1)	**Patel** (1-1)	None	ESPN+	1,780	23–11	10–3
Apr. 15	at Georgia Southern		J. I. Clements Stadium • Statesboro, GA	**L** 1–11	Paden (4-0)	**Dawson** (2-3)	None	ESPN+	1,694	23–12	10–4
Apr. 16	at Georgia Southern		J. I. Clements Stadium • Statesboro, GA	**L** 8–10	Johnson (4-3)	**Jones** (1-2)	None	ESPN+	1,650	23–13	10–5
Apr. 19	Kennesaw State		Georgia State Baseball Complex • Decatur, GA	**W** 6–5	**Jones** (2-2)	Pinson (3-2)	None	ESPN+	331	24–13	
Apr. 22	Louisiana		Georgia State Baseball Complex • Decatur, GA	**L** 4–5	Hammond (2-0)	**Jones** (2-3)	None	ESPN+	347	24–14	10–6
Apr. 23	Louisiana		Georgia State Baseball Complex • Decatur, GA	**L** 3–6	Schultz (2-3)	**Dawson** (2-4)	None	ESPN+	378	24–15	10–7
Apr. 24	Louisiana		Georgia State Baseball Complex • Decatur, GA	**L** 2–14^{7}	Wilson (4-1)	**Landry** (2-3)	None	ESPN+	367	24–16	10–8
Apr. 26	at No. 14 Georgia		Foley Field • Athens, GA	**L** 1–16	Marsh (3-0)	**Lutz** (2-1)	None	SECN+	2,882	24–17	
Apr. 29	at Troy		Riddle–Pace Field • Troy, AL	**L** 1–10	Fuller (2-0)	**Horton** (0-1)	None	ESPN+	1,949	24–18	10–9
Apr. 30	at Troy		Riddle–Pace Field • Troy, AL	**L** 3–4	Gamble (2-3)	**Watson** (1-2)	Stewart (4)	ESPN+	1,806	24–19	10–10

May (6–7)
Date	Opponent	Rank	Site/stadium	Score	Win	Loss	Save	TV	Attendance	Overall record	SBC record
May 1	at Troy		Riddle–Pace Field • Troy, AL	**L** 2–3	Schrepf (1-0)	**Landry** (2-4)	None	ESPN+	1,692	24–20	10–11
May 3	at Alabama State		Wheeler–Watkins Baseball Complex • Montgomery, AL	**W** 13–7	**Clark** (3-0)	Matos (0-3)	None		180	25–20	
May 4	Middle Tennessee		Georgia State Baseball Complex • Decatur, GA	**L** 7–9	Brycen (1-1)	**Watson** (1-3)	None		245	25–21	
May 6	Appalachian State		Georgia State Baseball Complex • Decatur, GA	**W** 12–1	**Horton** (1-1)	Tuthill (1-6)	None		351	26–21	11–11
May 7	Appalachian State		Georgia State Baseball Complex • Decatur, GA	**W** 4–2	**Clark** (4-0)	Cross (1-1)	**Watson** (8)		391	27–21	12–11
May 8	Appalachian State		Georgia State Baseball Complex • Decatur, GA	**L** 7–10	Cornatzer (3-1)	**Patel** (1-2)	Kepley (1)		389	27–22	12–12
May 10	Mercer		Georgia State Baseball Complex • Decatur, GA	**L** 5–11	Sutko (3-2)	**Acosta** (1-2)	None		305	27–23	
May 13	at Arkansas State		Tomlinson Stadium–Kell Field • Jonesboro, AR	**W** 10–2	**Horton** (2-1)	Medlin (1-6)	None		347	28–23	13–12
May 14	at Arkansas State		Tomlinson Stadium–Kell Field • Jonesboro, AR	**W** 7–4	**Patel** (2-2)	Nash (1-6)	**Watson** (9)		395	29–23	14–12
May 15	at Arkansas State		Tomlinson Stadium–Kell Field • Jonesboro, AR	**W** 5–4	**Clark** (5-0)	Jeans (3-5)	None	ESPN+	289	30–23	15–12
May 19	No. 13 Texas State		Georgia State Baseball Complex • Decatur, GA	**L** 7–8	Nicholas (2-1)	**Clark** (5-1)	Stivors (16)		389	30–24	15–13
May 20	No. 13 Texas State		Georgia State Baseball Complex • Decatur, GA	**L** 4–5	Wells (7-1)	**Patel** (2-3)	Stivors (17)		392	30–25	15–14
May 21	No. 13 Texas State		Georgia State Baseball Complex • Decatur, GA	**L** 3–4	Robie (4-0)	**Clark** (5-2)	Martinez (1)		398	30–26	15–15

Postseason (0–1)

SBC Tournament (0–1)
Date	Opponent	(Seed)/Rank	Site/stadium	Score	Win	Loss	Save	TV	Attendance	Overall record	Tournament record
May 24	vs. (10) Louisiana–Monroe	(7)	Montgomery Riverwalk Stadium • Montgomery, AL	**L** 5–8	Orton (2-1)	**Watson** (1-4)	None	ESPN+		30–27	0–1

Schedule Source:

*Rankings are based on the team's current ranking in the D1Baseball poll.

== Postseason ==
=== Conference Awards ===
- Newcomer of the Year: May Ryerson – GSU

All Conference First Team

- Reid VanScoter (CCU, RS-Sr, P)
- Levi Wells (TXST, So, P)
- Zeke Woods (TXST, Jr, P)
- Tristan Stivors (TXST, Sr, RP)
- Julian Brock (LA, So, C)
- Carson Roccaforte (LA, So, 1B)
- Jesse Sherrill (GASO, Jr, 2B)
- Dalton Shuffield (TXST, Sr, SS)
- Justin Thompson (TXST, Sr, 3B)
- Max Ryerson (GSU, Jr, OF)
- Mason Holt (ULM, Sr, OF)
- Miles Simington (USA, Sr, OF)
- Cameron Jones (GSU, So, UT)
- Noah Ledford (GASO, RS-Jr, DH)

All Conference Second Team

- Hayden Arnold (LR, Sr, P)
- Michael Knorr (CCU, Sr, P)
- Matt Boswell (USA, Sr, P)
- Jay Thomspon (GASO, Jr, RP)
- Hayden Cross (APP, Jr, C)
- Jason Swan (GASO, Sr, 1B)
- Erick Orbeta (USA, RS-So, 2B)
- Griffin Cheney (GSU, Gr, SS)
- Dale Thomas (CCU, Jr, 3B)
- Noah Dickerson (LR, RS-Jr, OF)
- Jose Gonzalez (TXST, Jr, OF)
- John Wuthrich (TXST, Sr, OF)
- Rigsby Mosley (TROY, Sr, UT)
- Tyler Johnson (CCU, Sr, DH)
