= 2022 Arkansas State Red Wolves baseball team =

American college baseball season

2022 Arkansas State Red Wolves baseball
- Conference: Sun Belt Conference
- Record: 11–38 (5–24 SBC)
- Head coach: Tommy Raffo (14th season)
- Assistant coaches: Alan Dunn; Rick Guarno
- Home stadium: Tomlinson Stadium–Kell Field

2022 Sun Belt Conference baseball standings
| | Conf. | | | | | | Overall |
| Team | W | | L | | T | PCT | W | | L | | T | PCT |
|---|---|---|---|---|---|---|---|---|---|---|---|---|
| No. 13 Texas State ‍†‍‍^{y} | 26 | – | 4 | – | 0 | .867 | 47 | – | 14 | – | 0 | .770 |
| No. 21 Georgia Southern ‍‍‍^{y} | 23 | – | 7 | – | 0 | .767 | 41 | – | 20 | – | 0 | .672 |
| Coastal Carolina ‍‍‍^{y} | 21 | – | 8 | – | 1 | .717 | 39 | – | 20 | – | 1 | .658 |
| Louisiana ‍‍‡‍^{y} | 19 | – | 11 | – | 0 | .633 | 37 | – | 23 | – | 0 | .617 |
| South Alabama ‍‍‍ | 17 | – | 13 | – | 0 | .567 | 31 | – | 23 | – | 0 | .574 |
| Troy ‍‍‍ | 15 | – | 15 | – | 0 | .500 | 32 | – | 24 | – | 0 | .571 |
| Georgia State ‍‍‍ | 15 | – | 15 | – | 0 | .500 | 30 | – | 27 | – | 0 | .526 |
| Little Rock ‍‍‍ | 11 | – | 18 | – | 0 | .379 | 24 | – | 27 | – | 0 | .471 |
| Appalachian State ‍‍‍ | 10 | – | 20 | – | 0 | .333 | 20 | – | 33 | – | 0 | .377 |
| Louisiana–Monroe ‍‍‍ | 9 | – | 20 | – | 1 | .317 | 20 | – | 35 | – | 1 | .366 |
| UT Arlington ‍‍‍ | 7 | – | 23 | – | 0 | .233 | 15 | – | 39 | – | 0 | .278 |
| Arkansas State ‍‍‍ | 5 | – | 24 | – | 0 | .172 | 11 | – | 38 | – | 0 | .224 |
† – Conference champion ‡ – Tournament champion y – Invited to the NCAA tournament Rankings from D1Baseball

The 2022 Arkansas State Red Wolves baseball team represented Arkansas State University during the 2022 NCAA Division I baseball season. The Red Wolves played their home games at Tomlinson Stadium–Kell Field and were led by fourteenth–year head coach Tommy Raffo. They were members of the Sun Belt Conference.

== Preseason ==
=== Sun Belt Conference Coaches Poll ===
The Sun Belt Conference Coaches Poll was released on February 9, 2022. Arkansas State was picked to finish twelfth with 28 votes.

Coaches poll
| Predicted finish | Team | Votes (1st place) |
| 1 | South Alabama | 139 (7) |
| 2 | Georgia Southern | 118 |
| T3 | Coastal Carolina | 117 (3) |
| T3 | Louisiana | 117 (2) |
| 5 | UT Arlington | 78 |
| 6 | Troy | 74 |
| 7 | Texas State | 71 |
| 8 | Little Rock | 63 |
| 9 | Louisiana–Monroe | 59 |
| 10 | Appalachian State | 38 |
| 11 | Georgia State | 34 |
| 12 | Arkansas State | 28 |

=== Preseason All-Sun Belt Team & Honors ===
- Miles Smith (USA, Sr, Pitcher)
- Hayden Arnold (LR, Sr, Pitcher)
- Tyler Tuthill (APP, Jr, Pitcher)
- Brandon Talley (LA, Sr, Pitcher)
- Caleb Bartolero (TROY, Jr, Catcher)
- Jason Swan (GASO, Sr, 1st Base)
- Luke Drumheller (APP, Jr, 2nd Base)
- Eric Brown (CCU, Jr, Shortstop)
- Ben Klutts (ARST, Sr, 3rd Base)
- Christian Avant (GASO, Sr, Outfielder)
- Josh Smith (GSU, Jr, Outfielder)
- Rigsby Mosley (TROY, Sr, Outfielder)
- Cameron Jones (GSU, So, Utility)
- Noah Ledford (GASO, Jr, Designated Hitter)

== Personnel ==
2022 Arkansas State Red Wolves baseball team
Players
Coaches

| # | Pos. | Name | B/T | Height | Weight | Year | Home town |
|---|---|---|---|---|---|---|---|
| 1 | OF | Eli Davis | L/L | 6 ft 0 in (1.83 m) | 195 lb (88 kg) | Jr | Brighton, Tennessee |
| 2 | OF | Jaylon DeShazier | R/R | 6 ft 2 in (1.88 m) | 225 lb (102 kg) | Sr | Pine Bluff, Arkansas |
| 3 | INF | Garrett Olson | R/R | 5 ft 9 in (1.75 m) | 180 lb (82 kg) | Jr | Lincoln, Nebraska |
| 4 | INF | Jared Toler | L/R | 6 ft 1 in (1.85 m) | 200 lb (91 kg) | So | Benton, Arkansas |
| 5 | RHP | Jonathan Baldelli | R/R | 5 ft 9 in (1.75 m) | 160 lb (73 kg) | Sr | Bartlett, Tennessee |
| 6 | INF | Blake McCutchen | R/R | 6 ft 0 in (1.83 m) | 165 lb (75 kg) | Sr | Cabot, Arkansas |
| 7 | LHP | Justin Medlin | L/L | 6 ft 0 in (1.83 m) | 220 lb (100 kg) | Sr | Ripley, Mississippi |
| 8 | C | Cason Tollett (redshirt) | R/R | 6 ft 1 in (1.85 m) | 210 lb (95 kg) | Fr | Little Rock, Arkansas |
| 9 | INF | Ben Klutts | R/R | 6 ft 3 in (1.91 m) | 220 lb (100 kg) | Sr | Poteau, Oklahoma |
| 10 | OF | Jacob Hager | R/R | 6 ft 0 in (1.83 m) | 215 lb (98 kg) | So | Festus, Missouri |
| 11 | C | Brandon Hager | R/R | 6 ft 0 in (1.83 m) | 250 lb (113 kg) | So | Festus, Missouri |
| 12 | RHP | Phillip Bryant (redshirt) | R/R | 5 ft 10 in (1.78 m) | 185 lb (84 kg) | So | Little Rock, Arkansas |
| 13 | LHP | Walker Williams (redshirt) | L/L | 5 ft 10 in (1.78 m) | 180 lb (82 kg) | Fr | Springdale, Arkansas |
| 14 | RHP | Tyler Jeans | R/R | 6 ft 4 in (1.93 m) | 210 lb (95 kg) | Jr | Texarkana, Arkansas |
| 15 | INF | Tristen Jamison | R/R | 6 ft 2 in (1.88 m) | 170 lb (77 kg) | So | Nashville, Arkansas |
| 16 | RHP | Brandon Anderson | R/R | 6 ft 2 in (1.88 m) | 215 lb (98 kg) | Sr | Omaha, Nebraska |
| 17 | INF | Wil French | R/R | 5 ft 10 in (1.78 m) | 175 lb (79 kg) | Fr | Jonesboro, Arkansas |
| 18 | RHP | Will Nash | R/R | 5 ft 11 in (1.8 m) | 210 lb (95 kg) | Sr | Wheatley, Arkansas |
| 19 | C | John Hoskyn | R/R | 6 ft 0 in (1.83 m) | 235 lb (107 kg) | So | Stuttgart, Arkansas |
| 20 | RHP | Carter Holt | R/R | 6 ft 5 in (1.96 m) | 260 lb (118 kg) | Sr | Jackson, Tennessee |
| 21 | OF | Sam Fagan (redshirt) | R/R | 6 ft 3 in (1.91 m) | 210 lb (95 kg) | Fr | Jonesboro, Arkansas |
| 22 | OF | Kyler Carmack | R/R | 6 ft 1 in (1.85 m) | 180 lb (82 kg) | Fr | Cabot, Arkansas |
| 23 | RHP | Will Gross | R/R | 5 ft 10 in (1.78 m) | 235 lb (107 kg) | So | Mountain Home, Arkansas |
| 24 | OF | Brandon Ulmer | L/R | 5 ft 10 in (1.78 m) | 180 lb (82 kg) | So | Booneville, Arkansas |
| 25 | RHP | Max Charlton | R/R | 6 ft 1 in (1.85 m) | 200 lb (91 kg) | So | Lenexa, Kansas |
| 27 | LHP | Austin Brock | L/L | 5 ft 11 in (1.8 m) | 170 lb (77 kg) | Jr | Senath, Missouri |
| 28 | RHP | Jake Algee | R/R | 6 ft 0 in (1.83 m) | 190 lb (86 kg) | So | Brookland, Arkansas |
| 29 | RHP | Kevin Wiseman (redshirt) | R/R | 6 ft 1 in (1.85 m) | 210 lb (95 kg) | Jr | Axtell, Texas |
| 30 | INF | Daedrick Cail | R/R | 6 ft 1 in (1.85 m) | 220 lb (100 kg) | Fr | Marion, Arkansas |
| 31 | INF | Jackson Harris | R/R | 6 ft 1 in (1.85 m) | 225 lb (102 kg) | Fr | Texarkana, Arkansas |
| 32 | | Mickey Coyne | L/L | 6 ft 2 in (1.88 m) | 205 lb (93 kg) | Jr | Reno, Nevada |
| 33 | RHP | Brandon Hughes | R/R | 6 ft 5 in (1.96 m) | 180 lb (82 kg) | Jr | Roland, Arkansas |
| 34 | RHP | Sawyer Bentley | R/R | 6 ft 0 in (1.83 m) | 175 lb (79 kg) | Fr | Jonesboro, Arkansas |
| 35 | RHP | Treshon Paschal | R/R | 6 ft 2 in (1.88 m) | 190 lb (86 kg) | Jr | Springdale, Arkansas |
| 36 | RHP | Will Gilmer (redshirt) | R/R | 6 ft 0 in (1.83 m) | 200 lb (91 kg) | So | Sikeston, Missouri |
| 37 | INF | Dawson Chester | R/R | 5 ft 10 in (1.78 m) | 200 lb (91 kg) | Fr | Pocahontas, Arkansas |
| 38 | INF | Ty Gordon | L/L | 5 ft 10 in (1.78 m) | 215 lb (98 kg) | Fr | Nashville, Arkansas |
| 39 | LHP | Jakob Frederick | L/L | 5 ft 8 in (1.73 m) | 170 lb (77 kg) | Jr | Sacramento, California |
| 40 | OF | Cooper Tremmel | L/R | 6 ft 0 in (1.83 m) | 190 lb (86 kg) | So | Lakeland, Tennessee |
| 41 | OF | Cross Jumper | R/R | 6 ft 2 in (1.88 m) | 200 lb (91 kg) | Fr | Jonesboro, Arkansas |

Head coach

Tommy Raffo (Mississippi State)

Assistant coach(es)

Alan Dunn (UAB)
Rick Guarno (Arkansas–Little Rock)
Drew LaBounty (South Alabama)

Legend

- (C) Team captain
- (S) Suspended
- (I) Ineligible
- Injured
- Current redshirt

Roster
Last update: 8 June 2022

== Schedule and results ==
Legend
| | Arkansas State win |
| | Arkansas State loss |
| | Postponement/Cancelation/Suspensions |
| **Bold** | Arkansas State team member |

2022 Arkansas State Red Wolves baseball game log
Regular season (11–38)

February (0–4)
| Date | Opponent | Rank | Site/stadium | Score | Win | Loss | Save | TV | Attendance | Overall record | SBC record |
|---|---|---|---|---|---|---|---|---|---|---|---|
| Feb. 18 | at Samford | | Joe Lee Griffin Stadium • Birmingham, AL | **L** 8–9 | Watkins (1-0) | **Anderson** (0-1) | Hobbs (1) | ESPN+ | 753 | 0–1 | |
| Feb. 19 | at Samford | | Joe Lee Griffin Stadium • Birmingham, AL | **L** 4–11 | Ross (0-1) | **Medlin** (0-1) | None | ESPN+ | 873 | 0–2 | |
| Feb. 20 | at Samford | | Joe Lee Griffin Stadium • Birmingham, AL | **L** 0–11 | Long (1-0) | **Jeans** (0-1) | None | ESPN+ | 811 | 0–3 | |
| Feb. 22 | at No. 3 Ole Miss | | Swayze Field • Oxford, MS | **L** 5–15 | Baker (1-0) | **Williams** (0-1) | None | SECN+ | 8,653 | 0–4 | |
| Feb. 27 | Arkansas–Pine Bluff | | Tomlinson Stadium–Kell Field • Jonesboro, AR | Game cancelled | | | | | | | |
| Feb. 27 | Arkansas–Pine Bluff | | Tomlinson Stadium–Kell Field • Jonesboro, AR | Game cancelled | | | | | | | |

March (5–13)
| Date | Opponent | Rank | Site/stadium | Score | Win | Loss | Save | TV | Attendance | Overall record | SBC record |
|---|---|---|---|---|---|---|---|---|---|---|---|
| Mar. 1 | Mississippi Valley State | | Tomlinson Stadium–Kell Field • Jonesboro, AR | **W** 17–2^{7} | **Williams** (1-1) | McClendon (0-2) | None | ESPN+ | 292 | 1–4 | |
| Mar. 2 | Mississippi Valley State | | Tomlinson Stadium–Kell Field • Jonesboro, AR | **W** 13–3^{7} | **Paschal** (1-0) | Valenzuela (1-2) | None | ESPN+ | 151 | 2–4 | |
| Mar. 4 | Illinois State | | Tomlinson Stadium–Kell Field • Jonesboro, AR | **W** 8–6 | **Williams** (2-1) | Scherbenske (0-1) | **Wiseman** (1) | | 309 | 3–4 | |
| Mar. 5 | Illinois State | | Tomlinson Stadium–Kell Field • Jonesboro, AR | **W** 2–1 | **Nash** (1-0) | Salata (1-2) | **Wiseman** (2) | ESPN+ | 757 | 4–4 | |
| Mar. 5 | Illinois State | | Tomlinson Stadium–Kell Field • Jonesboro, AR | **L** 1–7 | Wyman (1-0) | **Medlin** (0-2) | None | ESPN+ | 757 | 4–5 | |
| Mar. 8 | Southeast Missouri State | | Tomlinson Stadium–Kell Field • Jonesboro, AR | **L** 6–14 | Williams (1-1) | **Paschal** (1-1) | None | ESPN+ | 63 | 4–6 | |
| Mar. 9 | Southern Illinois | | Tomlinson Stadium–Kell Field • Jonesboro, AR | **L** 5–12 | Kuntzendorf (1-0) | **Jeans** (0-2) | None | ESPN+ | 177 | 4–7 | |
| Mar. 11 | at Missouri State | | Hammons Field • Springfield, MO | Game cancelled | | | | | | | |
| Mar. 12 | at Missouri State | | Hammons Field • Springfield, MO | **L** 3–12 | Link (2-1) | **Holt** (0-1) | Rodriguez (1) | | 438 | 4–8 | |
| Mar. 13 | at Missouri State | | Hammons Field • Springfield, MO | **L** 1–7 | Barnes (2-1) | **Jeans** (0-3) | Ziegenbein (1) | | 438 | 4–9 | |
| Mar. 15 | Memphis | | Tomlinson Stadium–Kell Field • Jonesboro, AR | **L** 7–9 | Casto (1-0) | **Hudson** (0-1) | Kendrick (2) | ESPN+ | 871 | 4–10 | |
| Mar. 18 | No. 22 Texas State | | Tomlinson Stadium–Kell Field • Jonesboro, AR | **L** 7–13 | Dixon (2-0) | **Anderson** (0-2) | None | | 188 | 4–11 | 0–1 |
| Mar. 19 | No. 22 Texas State | | Tomlinson Stadium–Kell Field • Jonesboro, AR | **L** 1–2 | Wells (3-0) | **Nash** (1-1) | Stivors (5) | | 249 | 4–12 | 0–2 |
| Mar. 20 | No. 22 Texas State | | Tomlinson Stadium–Kell Field • Jonesboro, AR | **L** 4–5 | Stivors (2-0) | **Wiseman** (0-1) | None | | 246 | 4–13 | 0–3 |
| Mar. 23 | at Southern Illinois | | Itchy Jones Stadium • Carbondale, IL | **L** 5–6 | Gould (2-0) | **Hudson** (0-2) | McDaniel (2) | | 50 | 4–14 | |
| Mar. 25 | at Georgia Southern | | J. I. Clements Stadium • Statesboro, GA | **L** 4–7 | Higgins (2-2) | **Charlton** (0-1) | Thompson (5) | ESPN+ | 1,697 | 4–15 | 0–4 |
| Mar. 26 | at Georgia Southern | | J. I. Clements Stadium • Statesboro, GA | **L** 2–12 | Fisher (2-1) | **Nash** (1-2) | None | ESPN+ | 2,055 | 4–16 | 0–5 |
| Mar. 27 | at Georgia Southern | | J. I. Clements Stadium • Statesboro, GA | **L** 6–7 | Thompson (2-0) | **Anderson** (0-3) | None | ESPN+ | 1,662 | 4–17 | 0–6 |
| Mar. 29 | Central Arkansas | | Tomlinson Stadium–Kell Field • Jonesboro, AR | **W** 4–3^{11} | **Baldelli** (1-0) | Gregson (1-3) | None | ESPN+ | 328 | 5–17 | |

April (5–11)
| Date | Opponent | Rank | Site/stadium | Score | Win | Loss | Save | TV | Attendance | Overall record | SBC record |
|---|---|---|---|---|---|---|---|---|---|---|---|
| Apr. 1 | Coastal Carolina | | Tomlinson Stadium–Kell Field • Jonesboro, AR | **L** 0–4 | VanScoter (5-1) | **Medlin** (0-3) | None | ESPN+ | 338 | 5–18 | 0–7 |
| Apr. 2 | Coastal Carolina | | Tomlinson Stadium–Kell Field • Jonesboro, AR | **L** 4–5 | Eikhoff (2-0) | **Nash** (1-3) | Carney (1) | ESPN+ | 295 | 5–19 | 0–8 |
| Apr. 3 | Coastal Carolina | | Tomlinson Stadium–Kell Field • Jonesboro, AR | **L** 8–16 | Parker (1-1) | **Frederick** (0-1) | None | ESPN+ | 309 | 5–20 | 0–9 |
| Apr. 5 | at Southeast Missouri State | | Capaha Field • Cape Girardeau, MO | **L** 5–8 | Osborne (1-1) | **Brock** (0-1) | Miller (6) | ESPN+ | 400 | 5–21 | |
| Apr. 8 | Louisiana | | Tomlinson Stadium–Kell Field • Jonesboro, AR | **L** 0–10 | Talley (1-1) | **Medlin** (0-4) | None | ESPN+ | 353 | 5–22 | 0–10 |
| Apr. 9 | Louisiana | | Tomlinson Stadium–Kell Field • Jonesboro, AR | **L** 3–5 | Menard (3-1) | **Wiseman** (0-2) | None | ESPN+ | 297 | 5–23 | 0–11 |
| Apr. 10 | Louisiana | | Tomlinson Stadium–Kell Field • Jonesboro, AR | **L** 4–7^{10} | Rawls (2-0) | **Jeans** (0-4) | None | ESPN+ | 255 | 5–24 | 0–12 |
| Apr. 14 | at Little Rock | | Gary Hogan Field • Little Rock, AR | **W** 6–5 | **Anderson** (1-3) | Arnold (4-3) | **Jeans** (1) | ESPN+ | 358 | 6–24 | 1–12 |
| Apr. 15 | at Little Rock | | Gary Hogan Field • Little Rock, AR | **W** 7–6 | **Jeans** (1-4) | Vaught (2-4) | None | | 387 | 7–24 | 2–12 |
| Apr. 16 | at Little Rock | | Gary Hogan Field • Little Rock, AR | Game cancelled | | | | | | | |
Arkansas–Arkansas State Series
| Apr. 19 | at No. 4 Arkansas | | Baum–Walker Stadium • Fayetteville, AR | **L** 1–10 | Ramage (2-2) | **Holt** (0-2) | None | SECN+ | 9,286 | 7–25 | |
| Apr. 20 | at No. 4 Arkansas | | Baum–Walker Stadium • Fayetteville, AR | **L** 3–10 | Tole (1-0) | **Frederick** (0-2) | None | SECN+ | 9,002 | 7–26 | |
| Apr. 22 | Troy | | Tomlinson Stadium–Kell Field • Jonesboro, AR | **W** 4–3 | **Medlin** (1-4) | Gainous (5-3) | **Wiseman** (3) | | 343 | 8–26 | 3–12 |
| Apr. 23 | Troy | | Tomlinson Stadium–Kell Field • Jonesboro, AR | **L** 1–6 | Fuller (4-1) | **Nash** (1-4) | None | ESPN+ | 282 | 8–27 | 3–13 |
| Apr. 24 | Troy | | Tomlinson Stadium–Kell Field • Jonesboro, AR | **W** 4–3^{10} | **Jeans** (2-4) | Stewart (4-2) | None | ESPN+ | 443 | 9–27 | 4–13 |
| Apr. 29 | at UT Arlington | | Clay Gould Ballpark • Arlington, TX | **L** 3–4^{11} | Moffat (1-6) | **Anderson** (1-4) | None | ESPN+ | 355 | 9–28 | 4–14 |
| Apr. 30 | at UT Arlington | | Clay Gould Ballpark • Arlington, TX | **W** 9–2^{10} | **Jeans** (3-4) | Novis (0-3) | None | ESPN+ | 445 | 10–28 | 5–14 |

May (1–10)
| Date | Opponent | Rank | Site/stadium | Score | Win | Loss | Save | TV | Attendance | Overall record | SBC record |
|---|---|---|---|---|---|---|---|---|---|---|---|
| May 1 | at UT Arlington | | Clay Gould Ballpark • Arlington, TX | **L** 4–5 | Moffat (2-6) | **Anderson** (1-5) | None | ESPN+ | 418 | 10–29 | 5–15 |
| May 6 | at South Alabama | | Eddie Stanky Field • Mobile, AL | **L** 1–7 | Boswell (6-3) | **Medlin** (1-5) | None | ESPN+ | 1,059 | 10–30 | 5–16 |
| May 7 | at South Alabama | | Eddie Stanky Field • Mobile, AL | **L** 2–13 | Lehrmann (3-2) | **Nash** (1-5) | Boyd (4) | ESPN+ | 1,178 | 10–31 | 5–17 |
| May 8 | at South Alabama | | Eddie Stanky Field • Mobile, AL | **L** 7–9 | Johnson (3-2) | **Anderson** (1-6) | Stokes (1) | ESPN+ | 913 | 10–32 | 5–18 |
| May 10 | at Memphis | | FedExPark • Memphis, TN | **W** 14–8 | **Frederick** (1-2) | Warren (0-3) | None | ESPN+ | 711 | 11–32 | |
| May 13 | Georgia State | | Tomlinson Stadium–Kell Field • Jonesboro, AR | **L** 2–10 | Horton (2-1) | **Medlin** (1-6) | None | | 347 | 11–33 | 5–19 |
| May 14 | Georgia State | | Tomlinson Stadium–Kell Field • Jonesboro, AR | **L** 4–7 | Patel (2-2) | **Nash** (1-6) | Watson (9) | | 395 | 11–34 | 5–20 |
| May 15 | Georgia State | | Tomlinson Stadium–Kell Field • Jonesboro, AR | **L** 4–5 | Clark (5-0) | **Jeans** (3-5) | None | ESPN+ | 289 | 11–35 | 5–21 |
| May 17 | Ole Miss | | Tomlinson Stadium–Kell Field • Jonesboro, AR | Game cancelled | | | | | | | |
| May 19 | at Louisiana–Monroe | | Warhawk Field • Monroe, LA | **L** 9–16 | Judice (3-1) | **Medlin** (1-7) | None | ESPN+ | 1,109 | 11–36 | 5–22 |
| May 20 | at Louisiana–Monroe | | Warhawk Field • Monroe, LA | **L** 7–13 | Jans (2-4) | **Nash** (1-7) | None | ESPN+ | 1,125 | 11–37 | 5–23 |
| May 21 | at Louisiana–Monroe | | Warhawk Field • Mobile, LA | **L** 3–6 | Wepf (2-5) | **Holt** (0-3) | None | ESPN+ | 1,073 | 11–38 | 5–24 |

Schedule source:

*Rankings are based on the team's current ranking in the D1Baseball poll.
