= 2022 South Alabama Jaguars baseball team =

College baseball season

2022 South Alabama Jaguars baseball
- Conference: Sun Belt Conference
- Record: 31–23 (17–13 SBC)
- Head coach: Mark Calvi (11th season)
- Assistant coaches: Alan Luckie; Nick Magnifico; Brad Phillips
- Home stadium: Eddie Stanky Field

2022 Sun Belt Conference baseball standings
	Conf.						Overall
Team	W		L		T	PCT	W		L		T	PCT
No. 13 Texas State ‍†‍‍^{y}	26	–	4	–	0	.867	47	–	14	–	0	.770
No. 21 Georgia Southern ‍‍‍^{y}	23	–	7	–	0	.767	41	–	20	–	0	.672
Coastal Carolina ‍‍‍^{y}	21	–	8	–	1	.717	39	–	20	–	1	.658
Louisiana ‍‍‡‍^{y}	19	–	11	–	0	.633	37	–	23	–	0	.617
South Alabama ‍‍‍	17	–	13	–	0	.567	31	–	23	–	0	.574
Troy ‍‍‍	15	–	15	–	0	.500	32	–	24	–	0	.571
Georgia State ‍‍‍	15	–	15	–	0	.500	30	–	27	–	0	.526
Little Rock ‍‍‍	11	–	18	–	0	.379	24	–	27	–	0	.471
Appalachian State ‍‍‍	10	–	20	–	0	.333	20	–	33	–	0	.377
Louisiana–Monroe ‍‍‍	9	–	20	–	1	.317	20	–	35	–	1	.366
UT Arlington ‍‍‍	7	–	23	–	0	.233	15	–	39	–	0	.278
Arkansas State ‍‍‍	5	–	24	–	0	.172	11	–	38	–	0	.224
† – Conference champion ‡ – Tournament champion y – Invited to the NCAA tournament Rankings from D1Baseball

The 2022 South Alabama Jaguars baseball team represented the University of South Alabama during the 2022 NCAA Division I baseball season. The Jaguars played their home games at Eddie Stanky Field and were led by eleventh-year head coach Mark Calvi. They were members of the Sun Belt Conference.

== Preseason ==
=== Sun Belt Conference Coaches Poll ===
The Sun Belt Conference Coaches Poll was released on February 9, 2022. South Alabama was picked to finish first with 139 votes and 7 first place votes.

Coaches poll
Predicted finish	Team	Votes (1st place)
1	South Alabama	139 (7)
2	Georgia Southern	118
T3	Coastal Carolina	117 (3)
T3	Louisiana	117 (2)
5	UT Arlington	78
6	Troy	74
7	Texas State	71
8	Little Rock	63
9	Louisiana–Monroe	59
10	Appalachian State	38
11	Georgia State	34
12	Arkansas State	28

=== Preseason All-Sun Belt Team & Honors ===
Preseason Pitcher of the Year Miles Smith (USA, Sr, Pitcher)

Preseason Team

- Miles Smith (USA, Sr, Pitcher)
- Hayden Arnold (LR, Sr, Pitcher)
- Tyler Tuthill (APP, Jr, Pitcher)
- Brandon Talley (LA, Sr, Pitcher)
- Caleb Bartolero (TROY, Jr, Catcher)
- Jason Swan (GASO, Sr, 1st Base)
- Luke Drumheller (APP, Jr, 2nd Base)
- Eric Brown (CCU, Jr, Shortstop)
- Ben Klutts (ARST, Sr, 3rd Base)
- Christian Avant (GASO, Sr, Outfielder)
- Josh Smith (GSU, Jr, Outfielder)
- Rigsby Mosley (TROY, Sr, Outfielder)
- Cameron Jones (GSU, So, Utility)
- Noah Ledford (GASO, Jr, Designated Hitter)

== Personnel ==
2022 South Alabama Jaguars baseball team
Players
Coaches

#	Pos.	Name	B/T	Height	Weight	Year	Home town
2	INF	Erick Orbeta (redshirt)	L/R	5 ft 8 in (1.73 m)	160 lb (73 kg)	So	Miami, Florida
4	OF	Hunter Donaldson	L/R	5 ft 10 in (1.78 m)	170 lb (77 kg)	So	Phenix City, Alabama
6	INF	Santi Montiel	R/R	5 ft 10 in (1.78 m)	180 lb (82 kg)	Jr	Alpharetta, Georgia
7		Joseph Sullivan	L/L	5 ft 11 in (1.8 m)	190 lb (86 kg)	Fr	Birmingham, Alabama
8	INF	Cameron Tissue	R/R	6 ft 0 in (1.83 m)	200 lb (91 kg)	Jr	Little Rock, Arkansas
9	INF	Logan Malone (redshirt)	R/R	5 ft 8 in (1.73 m)	155 lb (70 kg)	Fr	Huntsville, Alabama
10	INF	Landon Jordan (redshirt)	L/R	6 ft 0 in (1.83 m)	195 lb (88 kg)	So	Poplarville, Mississippi
11	RHP	JoJo Booker	R/R	6 ft 3 in (1.91 m)	220 lb (100 kg)	Sr	Brewton, Alabama
13	OF	Miles Simington	L/L	5 ft 8 in (1.73 m)	215 lb (98 kg)	Sr	Bourbonnais, Illinois
14	INF	Brandon Auerbach	R/R	5 ft 7 in (1.7 m)	185 lb (84 kg)	Jr	Parkland, Florida
15	C	Carter Sanford	L/R	5 ft 11 in (1.8 m)	200 lb (91 kg)	So	Fayette, Alabama
16	INF	Noah Bailey	L/R	5 ft 11 in (1.8 m)	190 lb (86 kg)	Jr	Niceville, Florida
17	RHP	Miles Smith	R/R	5 ft 9 in (1.75 m)	195 lb (88 kg)	Sr	Laurel, Mississippi
18	OF	Will Turner	L/L	6 ft 0 in (1.83 m)	185 lb (84 kg)	Fr	Auburn, Alabama
19	OF	Eli Runyan	R/L	5 ft 11 in (1.8 m)	170 lb (77 kg)	Fr	Carrollton, Georgia
20	C	Reid Powers	R/R	6 ft 2 in (1.88 m)	225 lb (102 kg)	Sr	Huntsville, Alabama
21	RHP	Jeremy Lee	R/R	5 ft 11 in (1.8 m)	195 lb (88 kg)	So	Valley Grande, Alabama
22	INF	Hunter Stokes (redshirt)	L/R	6 ft 2 in (1.88 m)	190 lb (86 kg)	Sr	Spanish Fort, Alabama
23	RHP	Justin Barry-Smith	R/R	5 ft 11 in (1.8 m)	190 lb (86 kg)	Fr	The Woodlands, Texas
24	RHP	Zach Harlan (redshirt)	R/R	5 ft 10 in (1.78 m)	200 lb (91 kg)	Jr	Daphne, Alabama
25	RHP	Grant Wood (redshirt)	R/R	6 ft 3 in (1.91 m)	185 lb (84 kg)	Fr	Georgetown, Texas
26	INF	Joe Sutton (redshirt)	R/R	5 ft 10 in (1.78 m)	190 lb (86 kg)	So	Gainesville, Georgia
27	RHP	Brock Hill	R/R	5 ft 10 in (1.78 m)	210 lb (95 kg)	Fr	Birmingham, Alabama
28	C	Diego Altamirano (redshirt)	L/R	5 ft 10 in (1.78 m)	200 lb (91 kg)	So	Bothell, Washington
29	RHP	John Gillis (redshirt)	R/R	6 ft 4 in (1.93 m)	195 lb (88 kg)	Fr	Crestview, Florida
30	RHP	Jackson Boyd (redshirt)	R/R	6 ft 0 in (1.83 m)	205 lb (93 kg)	Jr	Melbourne, Australia
31	INF	Kasey Donaldson (redshirt)	L/L	5 ft 10 in (1.78 m)	190 lb (86 kg)	So	Gulfport, Mississippi
33	RHP	Walker Johnson (redshirt)	R/R	6 ft 4 in (1.93 m)	210 lb (95 kg)	Jr	Mantee, Mississippi
34	OF	Charles Middleton Jr. (redshirt)	R/R	5 ft 10 in (1.78 m)	195 lb (88 kg)	Sr	Lincoln, California
35	RHP	Collin Brougham (redshirt)	R/R	6 ft 3 in (1.91 m)	205 lb (93 kg)	Jr	Kansas City, Missouri
36	OF	Bailee Hendon (redshirt)	L/L	6 ft 3 in (1.91 m)	185 lb (84 kg)	Jr	Vancleave, Mississippi
37	RHP	Carson Hall (redshirt)	R/R	6 ft 0 in (1.83 m)	190 lb (86 kg)	Jr	Homewood, Alabama
38	RHP	Austin Mills (redshirt)	R/R	6 ft 3 in (1.91 m)	205 lb (93 kg)	Fr	Huntsville, Alabama
39	RHP	Jake Glenn (redshirt)	R/R	6 ft 0 in (1.83 m)	200 lb (91 kg)	Fr	Huntsville, Alabama
40	RHP	Seth Carter	R/R	5 ft 11 in (1.8 m)	205 lb (93 kg)	Fr	Ocean Springs, Mississippi
43	RHP	Eric Lin	R/R	6 ft 1 in (1.85 m)	170 lb (77 kg)	Fr	Algonquin, Illinois
44	RHP	Matt Boswell	R/R	6 ft 1 in (1.85 m)	210 lb (95 kg)	Sr	Destin, Florida
45	LHP	Tyler Lehrmann (redshirt)	L/L	5 ft 11 in (1.8 m)	195 lb (88 kg)	Sr	Tallahassee, Florida
46	LHP	Eli Copenhaver	L/L	6 ft 2 in (1.88 m)	190 lb (86 kg)	Fr	Birmingham, Alabama
48		Harrison Ware	L/R	5 ft 10 in (1.78 m)	185 lb (84 kg)	So	Mountain Brook, Alabama

Head coach

Mark Calvi (Nova Southeastern)

Assistant coach(es)

Alan Luckie (Spring Hill)
Nick Magnifico (Missouri State)
Brad Phillips (Troy)

Legend

- (C) Team captain
- (S) Suspended
- (I) Ineligible
- Injured
- Current redshirt

Roster
Last update: 2 June 2022

== Schedule and results ==
Legend
	South Alabama win
	South Alabama loss
	Postponement/Cancelation/Suspensions
**Bold**	South Alabama team member

2022 South Alabama Jaguars baseball game log
Regular season (31–22)

February (5–2)
Date	Opponent	Rank	Site/stadium	Score	Win	Loss	Save	TV	Attendance	Overall record	SBC record
South Alabama Invitational
Feb. 18	Radford		Eddie Stanky Field • Mobile, AL	**W** 6–5	**Lee** (1-0)	Domecq (0-1)	**Boyd** (1)		1,142	1–0	
Feb. 19	Oral Roberts		Eddie Stanky Field • Mobile, AL	**L** 1–3	Kowalski (1-0)	**Boswell** (0-1)	Denton (1)		1,178	1–1	
Feb. 20	Tennessee Tech		Eddie Stanky Field • Mobile, AL	**L** 7–11	Myers (2-0)	**Johnson** (0-1)	None		1,132	1–2	
Feb. 22	at Southern Miss		Pete Taylor Park • Hattiesburg, MS	**W** 6–5	**Brougham** (1-0)	Harper (0-1)	**Copenhaver** (1)		4,502	2–2	
Feb. 25	Rhode Island		Eddie Stanky Field • Mobile, AL	**W** 15–2	**Smith** (1-0)	Twitchell (0-2)	None		1,056	3–2	
Feb. 26	Rhode Island		Eddie Stanky Field • Mobile, AL	**W** 9–1	**Boswell** (1-1)	Domenic (0-1)	None		1,123	4–2	
Feb. 27	Rhode Island		Eddie Stanky Field • Mobile, AL	**W** 3–2	**Harlan** (1-0)	Fernandez (0-1)	**Wood** (1)		1,078	5–2	

March (11–5)
Date	Opponent	Rank	Site/stadium	Score	Win	Loss	Save	TV	Attendance	Overall record	SBC record
Mar. 4	Middle Tennessee		Eddie Stanky Field • Mobile, AL	**W** 3–1	**Smith** (2-0)	Keenan (1-1)	**Wood** (2)	ESPN+	1,120	6–2	
Mar. 5	Middle Tennessee		Eddie Stanky Field • Mobile, AL	**W** 16–3	**Boswell** (2-1)	Swan (0-1)	None	ESPN+	1,175	7–2	
Mar. 6	Middle Tennessee		Eddie Stanky Field • Mobile, AL	**W** 4–2	**Booker** (1-0)	Wigginton (1-2)	**Boyd** (2)	ESPN+	1,073	8–2	
Mar. 8	at Southern Miss		Pete Taylor Park • Hattiesburg, MS	**L** 5–7	Rogers (1-0)	**Johnson** (0-2)	Harper (2)		4,241	8–3	
Mar. 11	at Jacksonville State		Rudy Abbott Field • Jacksonville, AL	**W** 7–0	**Smith** (3-0)	Hathcock (0-2)	None		611	9–3	
Mar. 11	at Jacksonville State		Rudy Abbott Field • Jacksonville, AL	**W** 7–6	**Johnson** (1-2)	Fagerstrom (0-1)	**Wood** (3)		611	10–3	
Mar. 13	at Jacksonville State		Rudy Abbott Field • Jacksonville, AL	**W** 4–3	**Lin** (1-0)	Causey (0-2)	None		613	11–3	
Mar. 15	at New Orleans		Maestri Field at Privateer Park • New Orleans, LA	**W** 6–1	**Lehrmann** (1-0)	Cerejo (0-1)	None		467	12–3	
Mar. 18	UT Arlington		Eddie Stanky Field • Mobile, AL	**W** 12–2	**Smith** (4-0)	Wong (1-2)	**Boyd** (3)		1,090	13–3	1–0
Mar. 19	UT Arlington		Eddie Stanky Field • Mobile, AL	**W** 12–4	**Boswell** (3-1)	Citelli (0-2)	None		1,286	14–3	2–0
Mar. 20	UT Arlington		Eddie Stanky Field • Mobile, AL	**W** 11–4	**Booker** (2-0)	Moffat (0-4)	None		1,169	15–3	3–0
Mar. 22	vs. Auburn		Montgomery Riverwalk Stadium • Montgomery, AL	**L** 12–13	Burkhalter (3-0)	**Lin** (1-1)	None		1,535	15–4	
Mar. 25	at Louisiana		M. L. Tigue Moore Field at Russo Park • Lafayette, LA	**L** 4–5^{11}	Menard (2-0)	**Wood** (0-1)	None		4,065	15–5	3–1
Mar. 26	at Louisiana		M. L. Tigue Moore Field at Russo Park • Lafayette, LA	**W** 6–5	**Boswell** (4-1)	Schultz (1-3)	None		4,016	16–5	4–1
Mar. 27	at Louisiana		M. L. Tigue Moore Field at Russo Park • Lafayette, LA	**L** 3–6	Theut (1-2)	**Lin** (1-2)	Menard (1)		4,408	16–6	4–2
Mar. 29	at Alabama		Sewell–Thomas Stadium • Tuscaloosa, AL	**L** 4–5	Leger (1-0)	**Boyd** (0-1)	None		3,435	16–7	

April (7–11)
Date	Opponent	Rank	Site/stadium	Score	Win	Loss	Save	TV	Attendance	Overall record	SBC record
Apr. 1	at Georgia State		Georgia State Baseball Complex • Decatur, GA	**L** 8–10	Clark (2-0)	**Smith** (4-1)	Watson (4)		215	16–8	4–3
Apr. 2	at Georgia State		Georgia State Baseball Complex • Decatur, GA	**L** 3–4	Dawson (2-2)	**Boswell** (4-2)	Treadway (2)		395	16–9	4–4
Apr. 3	at Georgia State		Georgia State Baseball Complex • Decatur, GA	**L** 5–9	Jones (1-1)	**Lehrmann** (1-1)	Watson (5)		376	16–10	4–5
Apr. 5	Southeastern Louisiana		Eddie Stanky Field • Mobile, AL	Game cancelled							
Apr. 6	Alabama State		Eddie Stanky Field • Mobile, AL	**W** 10–0	**Mills** (1-0)	Rivera (0-1)	None		1,238	17–10	
Apr. 8	Appalachian State		Eddie Stanky Field • Mobile, AL	**W** 9–0	**Boswell** (5-2)	Cornazter (1-1)	None		1,047	18–10	5–5
Apr. 9	Appalachian State		Eddie Stanky Field • Mobile, AL	**W** 6–2	**Booker** (3-0)	Hamilton (1-5)	None		1,165	19–10	6–5
Apr. 10	Appalachian State		Eddie Stanky Field • Mobile, AL	**W** 9–0	**Lehrmann** (2-1)	Tujetsch (2-2)	None		1,063	20–10	7–5
Apr. 12	at Alabama State		Wheeler–Watkins Baseball Complex • Montgomery, AL	**L** 4–7	Harris (2-2)	**Runyan** (0-1)	Mendez (1)		1,238	21–10	
Apr. 14	at Troy		Riddle–Pace Field • Troy, AL	**W** 11–3	**Smith** (5-1)	Pettys (2-1)	None	ESPN+	2,210	22–10	8–5
Apr. 15	at Troy		Riddle–Pace Field • Troy, AL	**L** 8–10	Gainous (5-2)	**Booker** (3-1)	Stewart (3)	ESPN+	1,835	22–11	8–6
Apr. 15	at Troy		Riddle–Pace Field • Troy, AL	**W** 11–6	**Lin** (2-0)	Gamble (0-3)	None	ESPN+	1,903	22–12	9–6
Apr. 19	at Southeastern Louisiana		Pat Kenelly Diamond at Alumni Field • Hammond, LA	**L** 6–8	Trahan (2-1)	**Copenhaver** (0-1)	None		1,007	22–13	
Apr. 22	No. 25 Georgia Southern		Eddie Stanky Field • Mobile, AL	**L** 4–5	Thompson (4-1)	**Smith** (5-2)	None		1,217	22–14	9–7
Apr. 23	No. 25 Georgia Southern		Eddie Stanky Field • Mobile, AL	**L** 4–7	Paden (5-0)	**Booker** (3-2)	Johnson (1)		1,808	22–15	9–8
Apr. 24	No. 25 Georgia Southern		Eddie Stanky Field • Mobile, AL	**L** 2–7	Wray (7-1)	**Lehrmann** (2-2)	Thompson (6)		1,159	22–16	9–9
Apr. 26	Tulane		Eddie Stanky Field • Mobile, AL	**W** 8–1	**Johnson** (2-2)	Robinson (2-4)	None		1,075	23–16	
Apr. 29	at No. 17 Texas State		Bobcat Ballpark • San Marcos, TX	**L** 2–10	Wood (5-1)	**Boswell** (5-3)	None		1,204	23–17	9–10
Apr. 30	at No. 17 Texas State		Bobcat Ballpark • San Marcos, TX	**L** 10–11	Stivors (6-1)	**Carter** (0-1)	None		1,324	23–18	9–11

May (8–4)
Date	Opponent	Rank	Site/stadium	Score	Win	Loss	Save	TV	Attendance	Overall record	SBC record
May 1	at No. 17 Texas State		Bobcat Ballpark • San Marcos, TX	**W** 21–8	**Boyd** (1-1)	Bush (1-2)	None		1,209	24–18	10–11
May 3	No. 7 Southern Miss		Eddie Stanky Field • Mobile, AL	**L** 4–6	Storm (1-0)	**Carter** (0-2)	Rogers (4)		2,769	24–19	
May 6	Arkansas State		Eddie Stanky Field • Mobile, AL	**W** 7–1	**Boswell** (6-3)	Medlin (1-5)	None		1,059	25–19	11–11
May 7	Arkansas State		Eddie Stanky Field • Mobile, AL	**W** 13–2	**Lehrmann** (3-2)	Nash (1-5)	**Boyd** (4)		1,178	26–19	12–11
May 8	Arkansas State		Eddie Stanky Field • Mobile, AL	**W** 9–7	**Johnson** (3-2)	Anderson (1-6)	**Stokes** (1)		913	27–19	13–11
May 10	at Tulane		Greer Field at Turchin Stadium • New Orleans, LA	**L** 7–11	Hoffman (2-4)	**Brougham** (1-1)	None		1,435	27–20	
May 11	New Orleans		Eddie Stanky Field • Mobile, AL	Game canceled							
May 13	Louisiana–Monroe		Eddie Stanky Field • Mobile, AL	**W** 12–4	**Booker** (4-2)	Barlow (2-6)	None		1,007	28–20	14–11
May 14	Louisiana–Monroe		Eddie Stanky Field • Mobile, AL	**W** 3–1	**Boyd** (2-1)	Cressend (3-6)	None		1,106	29–20	15–11
May 15	Louisiana–Monroe		Eddie Stanky Field • Mobile, AL	**W** 4–2	**Johnson** (4-2)	Jans (1-4)	**Stokes** (2)		1,081	30–20	16–11
May 19	at Coastal Carolina		Springs Brooks Stadium • Conway, SC	**L** 2–11	VanScoter (9-2)	**Boswell** (6-4)	Maniscalco (2)		1,303	30–21	16–12
May 20	at Coastal Carolina		Springs Brooks Stadium • Conway, SC	**W** 15–7	**Boyd** (3-1)	Carney (1-1)	None		1,380	31–21	17–12
May 21	at Coastal Carolina		Springs Brooks Stadium • Conway, SC	**L** 1–13	Parker (5-3)	**Johnson** (4-3)	None		1,191	31–22	17–13

Postseason (0–1)

SBC Tournament (0–1)
Date	Opponent	(Seed)/Rank	Site/stadium	Score	Win	Loss	Save	TV	Attendance	Overall record	Tournament record
May 27	vs. (4) Louisiana	(5)	Montgomery Riverwalk Stadium • Montgomery, AL	**L** 1–9	Bonds (4-3)	**Boswell** (6-5)	Theut (2)	ESPN+		31–23	0–1

Schedule source:

*Rankings are based on the team's current ranking in the D1Baseball poll. |}

== Postseason ==
=== Conference Awards ===
All Conference First Team

- Reid VanScoter (CCU, RS-Sr, P)
- Levi Wells (TXST, So, P)
- Zeke Woods (TXST, Jr, P)
- Tristan Stivors (TXST, Sr, RP)
- Julian Brock (LA, So, C)
- Carson Roccaforte (LA, So, 1B)
- Jesse Sherrill (GASO, Jr, 2B)
- Dalton Shuffield (TXST, Sr, SS)
- Justin Thompson (TXST, Sr, 3B)
- Max Ryerson (GSU, Jr, OF)
- Mason Holt (ULM, Sr, OF)
- Miles Simington (USA, Sr, OF)
- Cameron Jones (GSU, So, UT)
- Noah Ledford (GASO, RS-Jr, DH)

All Conference Second Team

- Hayden Arnold (LR, Sr, P)
- Michael Knorr (CCU, Sr, P)
- Matt Boswell (USA, Sr, P)
- Jay Thomspon (GASO, Jr, RP)
- Hayden Cross (APP, Jr, C)
- Jason Swan (GASO, Sr, 1B)
- Erick Orbeta (USA, RS-So, 2B)
- Griffin Cheney (GSU, Gr, SS)
- Dale Thomas (CCU, Jr, 3B)
- Noah Dickerson (LR, RS-Jr, OF)
- Jose Gonzalez (TXST, Jr, OF)
- John Wuthrich (TXST, Sr, OF)
- Rigsby Mosley (TROY, Sr, UT)
- Tyler Johnson (CCU, Sr, DH)
