= 2022 UT Arlington Mavericks baseball team =

American college baseball season

2022 UT Arlington Mavericks baseball
- Conference: Sun Belt Conference
- Record: 15–39 (7–23 SBC)
- Head coach: Darin Thomas (15th season)
- Assistant coaches: Taylor Dugas; Brady Cox
- Home stadium: Clay Gould Ballpark

2022 Sun Belt Conference baseball standings
	Conf.						Overall
Team	W		L		T	PCT	W		L		T	PCT
No. 13 Texas State ‍†‍‍^{y}	26	–	4	–	0	.867	47	–	14	–	0	.770
No. 21 Georgia Southern ‍‍‍^{y}	23	–	7	–	0	.767	41	–	20	–	0	.672
Coastal Carolina ‍‍‍^{y}	21	–	8	–	1	.717	39	–	20	–	1	.658
Louisiana ‍‍‡‍^{y}	19	–	11	–	0	.633	37	–	23	–	0	.617
South Alabama ‍‍‍	17	–	13	–	0	.567	31	–	23	–	0	.574
Troy ‍‍‍	15	–	15	–	0	.500	32	–	24	–	0	.571
Georgia State ‍‍‍	15	–	15	–	0	.500	30	–	27	–	0	.526
Little Rock ‍‍‍	11	–	18	–	0	.379	24	–	27	–	0	.471
Appalachian State ‍‍‍	10	–	20	–	0	.333	20	–	33	–	0	.377
Louisiana–Monroe ‍‍‍	9	–	20	–	1	.317	20	–	35	–	1	.366
UT Arlington ‍‍‍	7	–	23	–	0	.233	15	–	39	–	0	.278
Arkansas State ‍‍‍	5	–	24	–	0	.172	11	–	38	–	0	.224
† – Conference champion ‡ – Tournament champion y – Invited to the NCAA tournament Rankings from D1Baseball

The 2022 UT Arlington Mavericks baseball team represented the University of Texas at Arlington during the 2022 NCAA Division I baseball season. The Mavericks played their home games at Clay Gould Ballpark and were led by fifteenth-year head coach Darin Thomas. They were members of the Sun Belt Conference.

== Preseason ==
=== Signing Day Recruits ===
Player	Hometown	Previous Team
Pitchers
Ryne Rodriguez	Fort Worth, Texas	Trinity Valley
Cade McGlade	McKinney, Texas	Odessa
Hitters
Ryan Black Jr.	Mansfield, Texas	Lake Ridge HS

=== Sun Belt Conference Coaches Poll ===
The Sun Belt Conference Coaches Poll was released on February 9, 2022. UT Arlington was picked to finish fifth with 78 votes.

Coaches poll
Predicted finish	Team	Votes (1st place)
1	South Alabama	139 (7)
2	Georgia Southern	118
T3	Coastal Carolina	117 (3)
T3	Louisiana	117 (2)
5	UT Arlington	78
6	Troy	74
7	Texas State	71
8	Little Rock	63
9	Louisiana–Monroe	59
10	Appalachian State	38
11	Georgia State	34
12	Arkansas State	28

=== Preseason All-Sun Belt Team & Honors ===
No players from the Mavericks were chosen.

== Personnel ==
2022 UT Arlington Mavericks baseball team
Players
Coaches

#	Pos.	Name	B/T	Height	Weight	Year	Home town
2	INF	Cason Gregory	R/R	5 ft 11 in (1.8 m)	165 lb (75 kg)	So	Cleburne, Texas
3	INF	Matthew Cavanagh (redshirt)	R/R	5 ft 11 in (1.8 m)	180 lb (82 kg)	So	Keller, Texas
4	OF	Zach Henry (redshirt)	L/R	6 ft 0 in (1.83 m)	185 lb (84 kg)	Fr	Rockwall, Texas
5	RHP	Tanner King	R/R	6 ft 2 in (1.88 m)	190 lb (86 kg)	Sr	Canyon, Texas
6	INF	Boone Montgomery	R/R	6 ft 1 in (1.85 m)	180 lb (82 kg)	Sr	Grapevine, Texas
7	INF	Tyler Rice	L/R	5 ft 10 in (1.78 m)	175 lb (79 kg)	Jr	Mesa, Arizona
9	C	Artie Ramirez (redshirt)	R/R	6 ft 1 in (1.85 m)	225 lb (102 kg)	Fr	Walnut, California
10	C	Sam Crowell	R/R	6 ft 1 in (1.85 m)	200 lb (91 kg)	So	Heath, Texas
11	INF	Tyce Armstrong	R/R	6 ft 3 in (1.91 m)	205 lb (93 kg)	Fr	Conroe, Texas
12	RHP	Zach Norris	R/R	6 ft 1 in (1.85 m)	210 lb (95 kg)	Jr	Paris, Texas
13	RHP	Jack Hagan	R/R	6 ft 3 in (1.91 m)	185 lb (84 kg)	So	McKinney, Texas
14	OF	Mitchell Sanford	L/R	6 ft 2 in (1.88 m)	195 lb (88 kg)	So	Berwick, Louisiana
15	LHP	Sam Collins	R/L	6 ft 1 in (1.85 m)	235 lb (107 kg)	Fr	Azle, Texas
16	OF	Matt Lumsden (redshirt)	L/R	6 ft 4 in (1.93 m)	240 lb (109 kg)	So	Simpsonville, South Carolina
17	INF	Evan Anderson	R/R	6 ft 0 in (1.83 m)	155 lb (70 kg)	Fr	Allen, Texas
18	RHP	Cade Citelli (redshirt)	R/R	6 ft 3 in (1.91 m)	195 lb (88 kg)	Fr	Prosper, Texas
19	OF	Nick Pierce (redshirt)	L/L	6 ft 0 in (1.83 m)	180 lb (82 kg)	So	Grapevine, Texas
20	RHP	Connery Peters	R/R	6 ft 6 in (1.98 m)	240 lb (109 kg)	Jr	Crowley, Texas
21	RHP	Hunter Marshall	R/R	6 ft 0 in (1.83 m)	190 lb (86 kg)	Fr	Keller, Texas
22	RHP	Michael Wong	R/R	6 ft 4 in (1.93 m)	240 lb (109 kg)	Sr	Las Vegas, Nevada
23	INF	Steven Saunders	L/R	6 ft 2 in (1.88 m)	210 lb (95 kg)	Jr	Sierra Vista, Arizona
24	RHP	David Moffat	R/R	6 ft 0 in (1.83 m)	215 lb (98 kg)	Sr	Wichita Falls, Texas
25	RHP	Brayden Brooks	R/R	6 ft 1 in (1.85 m)	205 lb (93 kg)	Jr	Brighton, Colorado
26	LHP	Gray Bailey	L/L	6 ft 0 in (1.83 m)	165 lb (75 kg)	Fr	Glendale, Arizona
27	OF	David VanVooren	R/R	6 ft 1 in (1.85 m)	205 lb (93 kg)	Jr	Bedford, Texas
28	INF	Tanner Rice	L/R	5 ft 7 in (1.7 m)	180 lb (82 kg)	Fr	Mesa, Arizona
29	LHP	Jarod Seals	L/L	6 ft 0 in (1.83 m)	180 lb (82 kg)	Jr	Haslet, Texas
33	C	Cade Sumbler (redshirt)	R/R	5 ft 11 in (1.8 m)	180 lb (82 kg)	Fr	Midlothian, Texas
34	RHP	Cade Winquest	R/R	6 ft 2 in (1.88 m)	205 lb (93 kg)	Jr	Haslet, Texas
35	LHP	Ryan Thomas (redshirt)	L/L	6 ft 0 in (1.83 m)	165 lb (75 kg)	Jr	Mansfield, Texas
36	INF	Justin Marino (redshirt)	L/R	6 ft 2 in (1.88 m)	200 lb (91 kg)	Jr	Arlington, Texas
40	RHP	Matt Novis	R/R	6 ft 0 in (1.83 m)	175 lb (79 kg)	Jr	Tempe, Arizona
41	OF	Wilson Galvan (redshirt)	R/R	6 ft 0 in (1.83 m)	185 lb (84 kg)	So	McKinney, Texas
42	INF	Jaden Brown	R/R	6 ft 1 in (1.85 m)	190 lb (86 kg)	So	Mississauga, Canada
44	RHP	Zach Peters (redshirt)	R/R	6 ft 5 in (1.96 m)	205 lb (93 kg)	Fr	Crowley, Texas
49	RHP	Joe Steeber	R/R	6 ft 4 in (1.93 m)	235 lb (107 kg)	Fr	Southlake, Texas
50	INF	Oscar Ponce (redshirt)	R/R	5 ft 11 in (1.8 m)	210 lb (95 kg)	Sr	Brownsville, Texas
54	RHP	Trevor Pruitt	R/R	5 ft 11 in (1.8 m)	180 lb (82 kg)	Jr	Peoria, Arizona

Head coach

Darin Thomas (Fort Hayes State)

Assistant coach(es)

Taylor Dugas (Alabama)
Brady Cox (UT Arlington)
Galen McSpadden (Southeast Missouri State)

Legend

- (C) Team captain
- (S) Suspended
- (I) Ineligible
- Injured
- Current redshirt

Roster
Last update: 8 June 2022

== Schedule and results ==
Legend
	UT Arlington win
	UT Arlington loss
	Postponement/Cancelation/Suspensions
**Bold**	UT Arlington team member

2022`UT Arlington Mavericks baseball game log
Regular season (15–39)

February (2–4)
Date	Opponent	Rank	Site/stadium	Score	Win	Loss	Save	TV	Attendance	Overall record	SBC record
Feb. 18	Texas A&M–Corpus Christi		Clay Gould Ballpark • Arlington, TX	**L** 3–4	Ramirez Jr. (1-0)	**Moffat** (0-1)	Nelson (1)		427	0–1	
Feb. 19	Texas A&M–Corpus Christi		Clay Gould Ballpark • Arlington, TX	**L** 2–6	Garcia (1-0)	**King** (0-1)	None		549	0–2	
Feb. 20	Texas A&M–Corpus Christi		Clay Gould Ballpark • Arlington, TX	**W** 9–7	**Bailey** (1-0)	Bird (0-1)	None		534	1–2	
Feb. 21	Michigan		Clay Gould Ballpark • Arlington, TX	**L** 7–9	Allen (1-0)	**King** (0-2)	Harajli (1)		575	1–3	
Feb. 27	at Stephen F. Austin		Jaycees Field • Nacogdoches, TX	**L** 3–5	Richter (2-0)	**Moffat** (0-2)	Parker (1)		201	1–4	
Feb. 27	at Stephen F. Austin		Jaycees Field • Nacogdoches, TX	**W** 12–2	**Wong** (2-1)	Todd (0-1)	None		205	2–4	

March (6–12)
Date	Opponent	Rank	Site/stadium	Score	Win	Loss	Save	TV	Attendance	Overall record	SBC record
Mar. 1	at No. 16 TCU		Lupton Stadium • Fort Worth, TX	**L** 5–8	Brown (2-0)	**Brooks** (0-1)	Ridings (4)		3,434	2–5	
Mar. 4	Nebraska		Clay Gould Ballpark • Arlington, TX	**W** 4–3	**Peters** (1-0)	Gomes (0-1)	None		720	3–5	
Mar. 5	Nebraska		Clay Gould Ballpark • Arlington, TX	**L** 2–8	McCarville (1-1)	**Moffat** (0-3)	None		766	3–6	
Mar. 6	Northwestern State		Clay Gould Ballpark • Arlington, TX	**W** 1–0	**Bailey** (2-0)	Brown (0-2)	**King** (1)		420	4–6	
Mar. 8	Army		Clay Gould Ballpark • Arlington, TX	**L** 4–8	Graver (1-0)	**Brooks** (0-2)	None		367	4–7	
Mar. 9	Army		Clay Gould Ballpark • Arlington, TX	**W** 8–5	**Peters** (2-0)	Trippi (0-1)	**King** (2)		493	5–7	
Mar. 12	at Incarnate Word		Sullivan Field • San Antonio, TX	**L** 1–7	Garza (2-1)	**Wong** (1-1)	None		214	5–8	
Mar. 12	at Incarnate Word		Sullivan Field • San Antonio, TX	**L** 3–9	Celestino (3-0)	**Bailey** (2-1)	None		225	5–9	
Mar. 13	at Incarnate Word		Sullivan Field • San Antonio, TX	**L** 2–15	Zavala (1-1)	**Citelli** (0-1)	None		185	5–10	
Mar. 15	Abilene Christian		Clay Gould Ballpark • Arlington, TX	**W** 14–2	**Bailey** (3-1)	Cervantes (0-2)	None		538	6–10	
Mar. 18	at South Alabama		Eddie Stanky Field • Mobile, AL	**L** 2–12	Smith (4-0)	**Wong** (1-2)	Boyd (3)		1,090	6–11	0–1
Mar. 19	at South Alabama		Eddie Stanky Field • Mobile, AL	**L** 4–12	Boswell (3-1)	**Citelli** (0-2)	None		1,286	6–12	0–2
Mar. 20	at South Alabama		Eddie Stanky Field • Mobile, AL	**L** 4–11	Booker (2-0)	**Moffat** (0-4)	None		1,169	6–13	0–3
Mar. 22	vs. Dallas Baptist		Globe Life Field • Arlington, TX	**L** 2–6	Sherlin (1-0)	**Winquest** (0-1)	None		400	6–14	
Mar. 25	Troy		Clay Gould Ballpark • Arlington, TX	**W** 8–5	**King** (1-2)	Gainous (3-2)	**Moffat** (1)		355	7–14	1–3
Mar. 26	Troy		Clay Gould Ballpark • Arlington, TX	**W** 7–6	**Hagan** (1-0)	Gamble (0-1)	None		442	8–14	2–3
Mar. 27	Troy		Clay Gould Ballpark • Arlington, TX	**L** 3–7	Witcher (3-1)	**Bailey** (3-2)	Oates (5)		350	8–15	2–4
Mar. 29	at Baylor		Baylor Ballpark • Waco, TX	**L** 9–15	Garcia (1-0)	**Citelli** (0-3)	None		1,458	8–16	

April (5–14)
Date	Opponent	Rank	Site/stadium	Score	Win	Loss	Save	TV	Attendance	Overall record	SBC record
Apr. 1	Louisiana–Monroe		Clay Gould Ballpark • Arlington, TX	**W** 5–2	**King** (2-2)	Barlow; 2-2)	**Bailey** (1)		405	9–16	3–4
Apr. 2	Louisiana–Monroe		Clay Gould Ballpark • Arlington, TX	**L** 2–5	Cressend (3-2)	**Wong** (1-3)	Orton (3)		559	9–17	3–5
Apr. 3	Louisiana–Monroe		Clay Gould Ballpark • Arlington, TX	**W** 5–2	**Winquest** (1-1)	Lien (1-2)	**Moffat** (2)		474	10–17	4–5
Apr. 5	No. 23 TCU		Clay Gould Ballpark • Arlington, TX	**L** 2–10	Bolden (2-0)	**Novis** (0-1)	None		730	10–18	
Apr. 6	at Tarleton State		Cecil Ballow Baseball Complex • Stephenville, TX	**W** 16–13	**Peters** (3-0)	Poe (1-2)	**Marshall** (1)		257	11–18	
Apr. 8	at Little Rock		Gary Hogan Field • Little Rock, AR	**L** 1–5	Arnold (4-2)	**King** (2-3)	Smallwood (3)		132	11–19	4–6
Apr. 9	at Little Rock		Gary Hogan Field • Little Rock, AR	**L** 3–4	Smallwood (3-3)	**Novis** (0-2)	None		292	11–20	4–7
Apr. 10	at Little Rock		Gary Hogan Field • Little Rock, AR	**L** 5–6^{10}	Davis (1-0)	**Bailey** (3-3)	None	ESPN+	353	11–21	4–8
Apr. 12	at Abilene Christian		Crutcher Scott Field • Abilene, TX	**L** 5–15^{7}	Jackson (1-0)	**Hagan** (1-1)	Sells (2)		329	11–22	
Apr. 14	No. 19 Texas State		Clay Gould Ballpark • Arlington, TX	**L** 1–6	Wood (3-1)	**King** (2-4)	None		585	11–23	4–9
Apr. 15	No. 19 Texas State		Clay Gould Ballpark • Arlington, TX	**L** 3–5	Stivors (5-1)	**Moffat** (0-5)	None		568	11–24	4–10
Apr. 16	No. 19 Texas State		Clay Gould Ballpark • Arlington, TX	**L** 6–17	Dixon (5-0)	**Winquest** (1-2)	None		619	11–25	4–11
Apr. 19	at No. 21 TCU		Lupton Stadium • Fort Worth, TX	**L** 1–15^{7}	Parker (2-2)	**Hagan** (1-3)	None		3,533	11–26	
Apr. 22	at Coastal Carolina		Springs Brooks Stadium • Conway, SC	**L** 3–4	Maniscalco (1-1)	**Moffat** (0-6)	None		1,527	11–27	4–12
Apr. 23	at Coastal Carolina		Springs Brooks Stadium • Conway, SC	**L** 1–7	Knorr (3-0)	**Wong** (1-4)	None		1,296	11–28	4–13
Apr. 24	at Coastal Carolina		Springs Brooks Stadium • Conway, SC	**L** 2–3	Parker (3-2)	**Winquest** (1-3)	None		1,124	11–29	4–14
Apr. 26	Tarleton State		Clay Gould Ballpark • Arlington, TX	**W** 7–5	**Pruitt** (1-0)	Boyd (1-4)	**Novis** (1)		455	12–29	
Apr. 29	Arkansas State		Clay Gould Ballpark • Arlington, TX	**W** 4–3^{11}	**Moffat** (1-6)	Anderson (1-4)	None		355	13–29	5–14
Apr. 30	Arkansas State		Clay Gould Ballpark • Arlington, TX	**L** 2–9^{10}	Jeans (3-4)	**Novis** (0-3)	None		445	13–30	5–15

May (2–9)
Date	Opponent	Rank	Site/stadium	Score	Win	Loss	Save	TV	Attendance	Overall record	SBC record
May 1	Arkansas State		Clay Gould Ballpark • Arlington, TX	**W** 5–4	**Moffat** (2-6)	Anderson (1-5)	None		418	14–30	6–15
May 3	at No. 13 Texas A&M		Olsen Field at Blue Bell Park • College Station, TX	**L** 5–10	Johnston (1-1)	**Marshall** (0-1)	None		5,168	14–31	
May 6	at Louisiana		M. L. Tigue Moore Field at Russo Park • Lafayette, LA	**L** 3–4	Bonds (3-2)	**Moffat** (2-7)	None		4,149	14–32	6–16
May 7	at Louisiana		M. L. Tigue Moore Field at Russo Park • Lafayette, LA	**L** 3–4	Schultz (3-3)	**Wong** (1-5)	Hammond (1)		4,177	14–33	6–17
May 8	at Louisiana		M. L. Tigue Moore Field at Russo Park • Lafayette, LA	**L** 5–6^{11}	Christie (1-0)	**Moffat** (2-8)	None		4,054	14–34	6–18
May 13	Appalachian State		Clay Gould Ballpark • Arlington, TX	**L** 1–3	Tuthill (2-6)	**King** (2-5)	Jernigan (1)		425	14–35	6–19
May 14	Appalachian State		Clay Gould Ballpark • Arlington, TX	**L** 1–3	Cross (2-1)	**Wong** (1-6)	None		378	14–36	6–20
May 15	Appalachian State		Clay Gould Ballpark • Arlington, TX	**W** 7–0	**Winquest** (2-3)	Cornatzer (3-2)	None		356	15–36	7–20
May 19	at Georgia Southern		J. I. Clements Stadium • Statesboro, GA	**L** 3–5	Fisher (5-2)	**King** (2-6)	Martin (2)		1,712	15–37	7–21
May 20	at Georgia Southern		J. I. Clements Stadium • Statesboro, GA	**L** 9–18	Paden (6-2)	**Wong** (1-7)	None		1,426	15–38	7–22
May 20	at Georgia Southern		J. I. Clements Stadium • Statesboro, GA	**L** 1–12^{7}	Harris (1-0)	**Winquest** (2-4)	None		1,877	15–39	7–23

Schedule source:

*Rankings are based on the team's current ranking in the D1Baseball poll.
