= Carson Roccaforte =

American baseball player (born 2002)

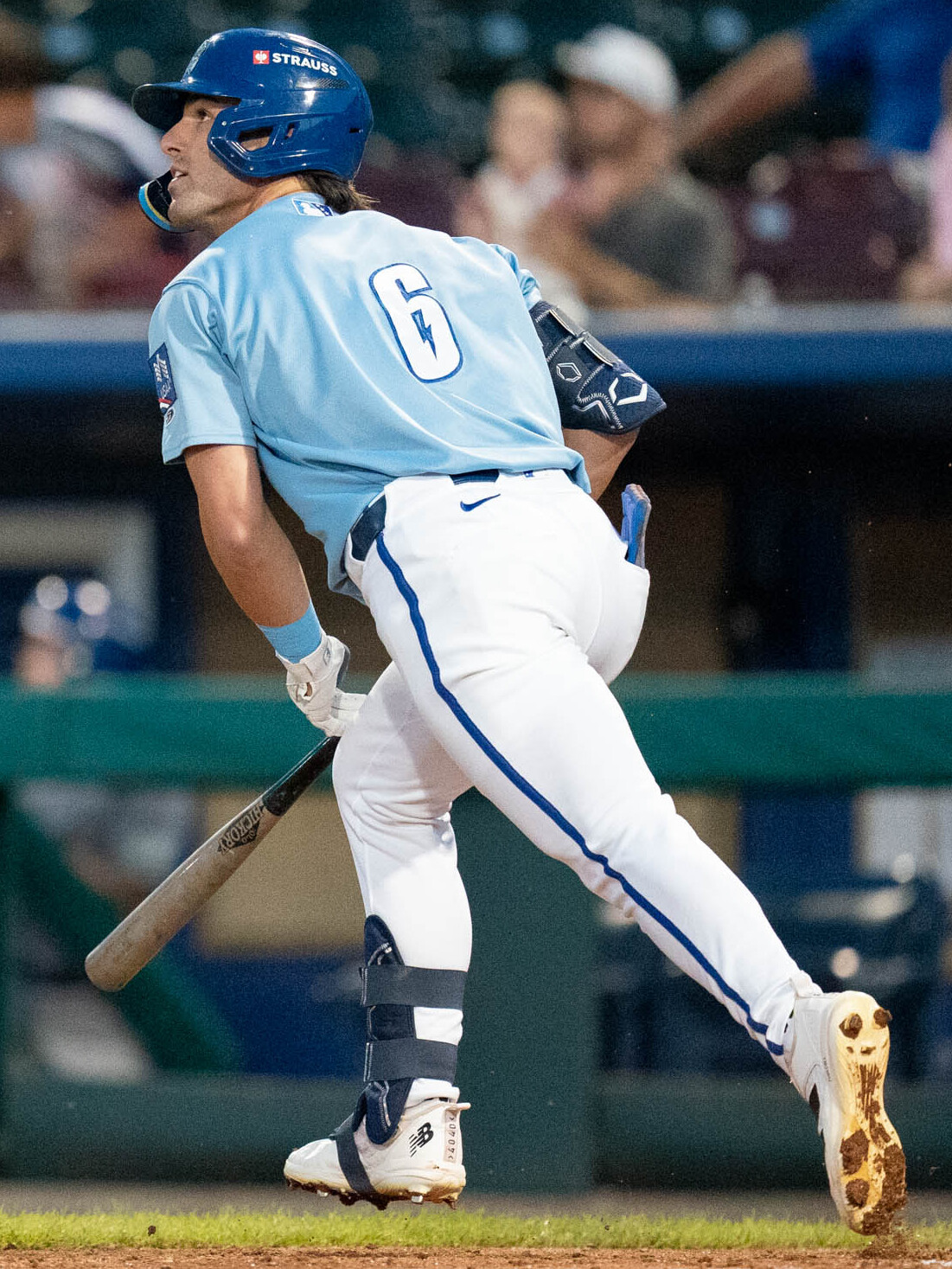
- Roccaforte with the Omaha Storm Chasers in 2026

Kansas City Royals
- Outfielder
- Born: March 29, 2002 (age 24); Beaumont, Texas, U.S.
- Bats: Left Throws: Left

Carson Anthony Roccaforte (born March 29, 2002) is an American professional baseball outfielder for the Kansas City Royals of Major League Baseball (MLB).

== Amateur career ==
Roccaforte grew up in Port Neches, Texas and attended Port Neches–Groves High School. He played college baseball at Louisiana. He had a career year in 2022, batting .374 with 16 home runs, 68 RBI, and 25 stolen bases. He was one of just three NCAA Division I players that year with 15 or more homers and 25 or more steals. For his performance on the year, he was named First Team All Sun-Belt and First Team NCAA Division I South All-Region. In 2022, he played collegiate summer baseball with the Bourne Braves of the Cape Cod Baseball League. Roccaforte would take a slight step down in 2023 with a .318 batting average, eight home runs, and 55 RBI, along with a program-record 26 doubles. Roccaforte finished his career with a .325 batting average, 28 home runs, and 145 RBI.

== Professional career ==
Roccaforte was selected by the Kansas City Royals in the second round with the 66th overall selection of the 2023 Major League Baseball draft. On July 25, 2023, Roccaforte signed with the Royals for a $897,500 signing bonus.

Roccaforte made his professional debut in August with the Arizona Complex League Royals and was shortly assigned to the Single-A Columbia Fireflies of the Carolina League to finish out the 2023 season, batting .293 with 15 RBI over 31 games. Immediately prior to the 2024 season, he was assigned to the Double-A Northwest Arkansas Naturals of the Texas League, but was optioned down to High-A Quad Cities River Bandits of the Midwest League before play began; he spent the entire year with Quad Cities, hitting .208 with 10 home runs, 62 RBI, and 34 stolen bases over 122 games, and was also named the Royals Defensive Player of the Year. Roccaforte opened the 2025 season with Quad Cities and was promoted to Northwest Arkansas in July. Over 82 games with Quad Cities and 45 with Northwest Arkansas, he batted .258 with 18 home runs, 74 RBI, and 43 stolen bases. He was assigned to play in the Arizona Fall League with the Surprise Saguaros after the season. In August, he was promoted to the Triple-A Omaha Storm Chasers of the International League. Between 110 games with Northwest Arkansas and 28 with Omaha, Roccaforte hit .257 with 35 home runs, 96 RBI, and 32 stolen bases.
