= 2022 Sun Belt Conference baseball tournament =

- Teams: 10
- Format: Double-elimination
- Finals site: Riverwalk Stadium; Montgomery, Alabama
- Champions: Louisiana
- Television: ESPN+

2022 Sun Belt Conference baseball standings
	Conf.						Overall
Team	W		L		T	PCT	W		L		T	PCT
No. 13 Texas State ‍†‍‍^{y}	26	–	4	–	0	.867	47	–	14	–	0	.770
No. 21 Georgia Southern ‍‍‍^{y}	23	–	7	–	0	.767	41	–	20	–	0	.672
Coastal Carolina ‍‍‍^{y}	21	–	8	–	1	.717	39	–	20	–	1	.658
Louisiana ‍‍‡‍^{y}	19	–	11	–	0	.633	37	–	23	–	0	.617
South Alabama ‍‍‍	17	–	13	–	0	.567	31	–	23	–	0	.574
Troy ‍‍‍	15	–	15	–	0	.500	32	–	24	–	0	.571
Georgia State ‍‍‍	15	–	15	–	0	.500	30	–	27	–	0	.526
Little Rock ‍‍‍	11	–	18	–	0	.379	24	–	27	–	0	.471
Appalachian State ‍‍‍	10	–	20	–	0	.333	20	–	33	–	0	.377
Louisiana–Monroe ‍‍‍	9	–	20	–	1	.317	20	–	35	–	1	.366
UT Arlington ‍‍‍	7	–	23	–	0	.233	15	–	39	–	0	.278
Arkansas State ‍‍‍	5	–	24	–	0	.172	11	–	38	–	0	.224
† – Conference champion ‡ – Tournament champion y – Invited to the NCAA tournament Rankings from D1Baseball

The 2022 Sun Belt Conference baseball tournament was held at Riverwalk Stadium in Montgomery, Alabama from May 24 to May 29, 2022. The tournament used a double-elimination format. The winner of the tournament earned the Sun Belt Conference's automatic bid to the 2022 NCAA Division I baseball tournament.

== Seeding ==
In a change from previous years, the top ten teams (based on conference results) from the conference earned invites to the tournament. The teams were seeded based on conference winning percentage, with the bottom four seeds competing in a play-in round. The remaining eight teams were then scheduled to play in a two bracket, double-elimination tournament, with the winner of each bracket advancing to the championship final.

== Results ==
=== Play-in round ===
All games played on Tuesday, May 24 were single elimination. The lower-seeded first round winner advanced to play the No. 1 seed, while the higher-seeded first round winner faced the No. 2 seed.

Tuesday, May 24
Team	R
#10 Louisiana-Monroe	8
#7 Georgia State	5

Tuesday, May 24
Team	R
#9 Appalachian State	10
#8 Little Rock	3

=== Single-elimination round ===
The Sun Belt Conference announced on Wednesday, May 25 that the tournament would go from a double elimination bracket to a single elimination bracket due to a significant weather delay on Wednesday, May 25.

Quarterfinals
1	Texas State	8
10	Louisiana-Monroe	2
4	Louisiana	9
5	South Alabama	1
3	Coastal Carolina	4
6	Troy	6
2	Georgia Southern	7
9	Appalachian State	1

Semifinals
4	Louisiana	3
1	Texas State	2
6	Troy	0
2	Georgia Southern	8

Finals
4	Louisiana	7
2	Georgia Southern	6
