= Southern Conference Baseball Coach of the Year =

- Awarded for: the most outstanding baseball Coach in the Southern Conference
- Country: United States
- First award: 1972
- Currently held by: Craig Gibson, Mercer

The Southern Conference Baseball Coach of the Year is a baseball award given to the Southern Conference's most outstanding coach. The award was first given after the 1972 season, but was not awarded in 1973 or 1974. The Southern Conference began sponsoring baseball in 1947.

== Key ==
Coach (X)	Denotes the number of times the coach had been awarded the Coach of the Year award at that point
Conf. W–L	Conference win–loss record for that season
Conf. St.^{T}	Conference standing at year's end (^{T}denotes a tie)
Overall W–L	Overall win–loss record for that season

== Winners ==
Season	Coach	School	Conf. W–L	Conf. St.	Overall W–L	Reference
1972	Chuck Boone	Richmond	13–1	1	21–8	
1975	Chal Port	The Citadel	11–3	1	21–9	
1976	Tom Wall	Furman	11–2	1	23–16	
1977	Monte Little	East Carolina	15–1	1	30–12	
1978	Jack Cook	Marshall	11–1	1	27–13	
1979	Chal Port (2)	The Citadel	13–3	1	27–15	
1980	Charley Lodes	East Tennessee State	14–1	1	39–7	
1981	Bill Hayward	Western Carolina	12–4	1^{T}	25–14	
1982	Chal Port (3); Donny White	The Citadel; VMI	12–4; 6–10	1^{T} 6	40–8; 11–29	
1983	Chal Port (4)	The Citadel	12–2	1	34–10	
1984	Jim Morris	Appalachian State	12–2	1 (Northern)	35–7	
1985	George Greer	Davidson	11–5	1 (Southern)	24–19	
1986	Harold Stout	East Tennessee State	9–9	2 (Northern)	21–21	
1987	Jack Leggett	Western Carolina	13–3	1 (Southern)	25–20	
1988	Paul Maini	VMI	11–7	1 (Northern)	20–20	
1989	Jack Cook (2)	Marshall	8–5	2	16–14	
1990	Chal Port (5)	The Citadel	13–1	1	46–14	
1991	Chal Port (6)	The Citadel	16–2	1	34–19	
1992	Keith LeClair	Western Carolina	17–4	1	44–21	
1993	Jack Stallings	Georgia Southern	18–5	1	38–21	
1994	Keith LeClair (2)	Western Carolina	19–4	1	45–18	
1995	Fred Jordan	The Citadel	19–5	1	39–19	
1996	Jack Stallings (2)	Georgia Southern	17–3	1	46–14	
1997	Keith LeClair (3)	Western Carolina	18–6	1	42–20	
1998	Mike Gaski	UNC Greensboro	22–5	1	40–18	
1999	Fred Jordan (2)	The Citadel	24–5	1	41–20	
2000	Rodney Hennon	Georgia Southern	23–7	1^{T}	38–22	
2001	Rodney Hennon (2)	Georgia Southern	21–9	1	42–20	
2002	Todd Raleigh	Western Carolina	20–10	2	33–23	
2003	Tom Slater	VMI	16–14	7	24–28	
2004	John Pawlowski	College of Charleston	25–5	1	47–16	
2005	John Pawlowski (2)	College of Charleston	27–3	1	48–15	
2006	Mike Kennedy	Elon	21–6	1	45–18	
2007	John Pawlowski (3)	College of Charleston	20–7	1^{T}	39–19	
2008	Mike Kennedy (2)	Elon	19–8	1	44–18	
2009	Mike Kennedy (3)	Elon	23–4	1	41–18	
2010	Fred Jordan (3)	The Citadel	24–6	1	43–22	
2011	Mike Gaski (2)	UNC Greensboro	22–8	2	34–20	
2012	Chris Pollard	Appalachian State	21–9	1^{T}	38–14	
2013	Bobby Moranda	Western Carolina	23–7	1	39–20	
2014	Dick Cooke	Davidson	17–8	2	29–19	
2015	Craig Gibson	Mercer	16–7	1	35–22	
2016	Link Jarrett	UNC Greensboro	15–9	2^{T}	38–21	
2017	Craig Gibson (2)	Mercer	17–6	1	39–17	
2018	Link Jarrett (2)	UNC Greensboro	18–3	1	39–15	
2019	Casey Dunn	Samford	19–5	1	41–19	
2021	Todd Interdonato	Wofford	21–9	1	36–21	
2022	Todd Interdonato (2)	Wofford	16–4	1	42–16	
2023	Tony David	Samford	15–6	1	37–25	
2024	Cody Ellis	UNC Greensboro	15–6	1	33–21	
2025	Joe Pennucci	East Tennessee State	14–7	1	41–17	
2026	Craig Gibson (3)	Mercer	15–6	1	43–13	

== Winners by school ==
School (year joined)	Winners	Years
The Citadel (1947)	9	1975, 1979, 1982, 1983, 1990, 1991, 1995, 1999, 2010
Western Carolina (1977)	7	1981, 1987, 1992, 1994, 1997, 2002, 2013
UNC Greensboro (1998)	5	1998, 2011, 2016, 2018, 2024
Georgia Southern (Note: Georgia Southern departed the SoCon for the Sun Belt Conference after the 2014 season.) (1993)	4	1993, 1996, 2000, 2001
College of Charleston (Note: College of Charleston departed the SoCon for the Colonial Athletic Association after the 2013 season.) (1998)	3	2004, 2005, 2007
East Tennessee State (Note: East Tennessee State departed the SoCon for the Atlantic Sun Conference after the 2005 season, but returned beginning with the 2015 season.) (1979)	3	1980, 1986, 2025
Elon (Note: Elon departed the SoCon for the Colonial Athletic Association after the 2014 season.) (2003)	3	2006, 2008, 2009
Mercer (2015)	3	2015, 2017, 2026
VMI (Note: VMI departed the SoCon for the Big South Conference after the 2003 season, but returned beginning with the 2015 season.) (1947)	3	1982, 1988, 2003
Appalachian State (Note: Appalachian State departed the SoCon for the Sun Belt Conference after the 2014 season.) (1972)	2	1984, 2012
Davidson (Note: Davidson was not a member of the SoCon from 1989 through 1992, and departed for the Atlantic 10 Conference after the 2014 season.) (1947)	2	1985, 2014
Marshall (Note: Marshall departed the SoCon for the Mid-American Conference after the 1997 season.) (1977)	2	1978, 1989
Samford (2009)	2	2019, 2023
Wofford (1998)	2	2021, 2022
East Carolina (Note: East Carolina departed the SoCon to become an Independent after the 1978 season.) (1965)	1	1977
Furman (1947)	1	1976
Richmond (Note: Richmond departed the SoCon to become an Independent after the 1976 season.) (1947)	1	1972
