= Chad Holbrook =

American baseball coach

Current position
- Title: Head coach
- Team: College of Charleston
- Conference: CAA
- Record: 290–172 (.628)

Biographical details
- Born: January 14, 1971 (age 55); Shelby, North Carolina
- Education: University of North Carolina

Playing career
- 1990-1993: North Carolina

Coaching career (HC unless noted)
- 1994–2007: North Carolina (assistant)
- 2008: North Carolina (associate HC)
- 2009–2012: South Carolina (associate HC)
- 2013–2017: South Carolina
- 2018–present: College of Charleston

Head coaching record
- Overall: 490–278 (.638)

Accomplishments and honors

Championships
- SEC East (2016); 2 CAA (2022, 2024)

Awards
- Baseball America Assistant Coach of the Year (2011); Recruiter of the Year (2010); 2× CAA Coach of the Year (2022, 2024)

Chad Holbrook (born January 14, 1971) is an American baseball coach, who is the current head baseball coach of the College of Charleston Cougars. Prior to becoming head coach for the Cougars, Holbrook was head coach at the University of South Carolina, and an assistant for both the University of North Carolina and the University of South Carolina.

== Playing career ==
Holbrook attended the University of North Carolina in Chapel Hill from 1990 to 1993, receiving second-team All-ACC honors as a senior. He graduated in 1994 with a degree in physical education. In 1992, he played collegiate summer baseball for the Chatham A's of the Cape Cod Baseball League.

== Coaching career ==
=== North Carolina ===
At the conclusion of his playing career, Holbrook served as an undergraduate assistant coach for the 1994 season before being promoted to Assistant Coach in 1995 and Associate head coach in 2007. In 1997, he managed the Harwich Mariners, a collegiate summer baseball team in the prestigious Cape Cod Baseball League. In his 15 seasons on the Tar Heel coaching staff, North Carolina made 11 NCAA tournament appearances and three College World Series appearances.

=== South Carolina ===
After the 2008 season, Holbrook left North Carolina to become the associate head coach at South Carolina. In Holbrook's time as associate head coach, South Carolina won back-to-back national championships in 2010 and 2011 and finished as the national runner-up in 2012. In 2011, ESPN the Magazine named Holbrook the 10th best recruiter in all of college athletics. After the 2011 season, Holbrook was named Assistant Coach of the Year by 2011 Assistant Coach of the Year by the ABCA and Baseball America.

Holbrook became head coach after Ray Tanner became the athletic director at South Carolina following the 2012 season. In his first season as head coach, Holbrook and the Gamecocks finished with a 43–20 overall record and finished second in the SEC Eastern division with a 17–12 record in conference play. The Gamecocks hosted and won the Columbia Regional. However, the team lost two out of three games to the North Carolina Tar Heels in the NCAA Super Regionals.

=== College of Charleston ===
On July 20, 2017, it was announced that Holbrook was hired as the head coach at the College of Charleston.

== Personal ==
Holbrook's father, Eddie Holbrook, was the head basketball coach at Gardner–Webb University and Furman University. Holbrook and his wife, Jennifer, have two sons, Reece and Cooper. Holbrook's oldest son, Reece, recently committed to The University of North Carolina Chapel Hill baseball team.

== Head coaching record ==
Record table
Season	Team	Overall	Conference	Standing	Postseason
South Carolina Gamecocks (Southeastern Conference) (2013–2017)
2013	South Carolina	43–20	17–12	2nd (East)	NCAA Super Regional
2014	South Carolina	44–18	18–12	2nd (East)	NCAA Regional
2015	South Carolina	32–25	13–17	5th (East)	
2016	South Carolina	46–18	20–9	1st (East)	NCAA Super Regional
2017	South Carolina	35–25	13–17	5th (East)	
South Carolina:		200–106 (.654)	81–67 (.547)		
College of Charleston Cougars (Colonial Athletic Association) (2018–present)
2018	College of Charleston	36–19	15–8	3rd	CAA tournament
2019	College of Charleston	36–20	16–8	2nd	CAA tournament
2020	College of Charleston	12–2	0–0		Season canceled due to COVID-19
2021	College of Charleston	27–25	12–12	3rd (South)	CAA tournament
2022	College of Charleston	37–20	19–5	1st	CAA tournament
2023	College of Charleston	36–22	18–12	4th	CAA tournament
2024	College of Charleston	41–14	21–5	1st	CAA tournament
2025	College of Charleston	37–22	15–12	T-3rd	CAA tournament
2026	College of Charleston	28-28	18-12	2nd (South)	CAA tournament
College of Charleston:		290–172 (.628)	134–74 (.644)		
Total:		490–278 (.638)			
National champion Postseason invitational champion Conference regular season champion Conference regular season and conference tournament champion Division regular season champion Division regular season and conference tournament champion Conference tournament champion

== See also ==
- List of current NCAA Division I baseball coaches
