= Mike Kennedy (baseball) =

American baseball coach and catcher (born 1969)

Current position
- Title: Head coach
- Team: Elon
- Conference: CAA
- Record: 902–749–3 (.546)

Biographical details
- Born: May 21, 1969 (age 57); Fayetteville, North Carolina, U.S.

Playing career
- 1988–1990: Elon
- 1990: Modesto A's
- 1990: Arizona League Athletics
- 1991: Southern Oregon A's
- Position: Catcher

Coaching career (HC unless noted)
- 1993–1996: Elon (asst.)
- 1997–present: Elon

Head coaching record
- Overall: 902–749–3 (.546)
- Tournaments: NCAA: 4–10

Accomplishments and honors

Championships
- SAC Conference Tournament (1996); 1× SoCon Tournament (2008); 5× SoCon Regular season (2006, 2008, 2009, 2011); 1× CAA Regular season (2019)

Michael D. Kennedy (born May 21, 1969) is an American baseball coach and former catcher, who is the current head coach of the Elon Phoenix.

== Career ==
Kennedy played college baseball at Elon for coaches Rick Jones and Mike Harden from 1988 to 1990. In 1989, he played collegiate summer baseball with the Hyannis Mets of the Cape Cod Baseball League. Kennedy played in Minor League Baseball (MiLB) for 2 seasons from 1990 to 1991. Under Kennedy, the Phoenix have won four Southern Conference regular season championships, one Southern Conference baseball tournament championship, one Colonial Athletic Association and made five NCAA Regional appearances.

== Head coaching record ==
The following is a table of Kennedy's yearly records as an NCAA head baseball coach.

Record table
Season	Team	Overall	Conference	Standing	Postseason
Elon Fightin' Christians (South Atlantic Conference) (1997)
1997	Elon	34–16	16–5		NCAA Regional
Elon:			16–5		
Elon Fightin' Christians (Independent) (1998–1998)
1998	Elon	26–22			
1999	Elon	20–35–1			
Elon:					
Elon Phoenix (Big South Conference) (2000–2003)
2000	Elon	33–25	11–10	t-4th	Big South Tournament (Note: In this season, all members of the Big South Conference qualified for the conference tournament.)
2001	Elon	30–27	12–9	4th	Big South Tournament
2002	Elon	34–23	13–8	2nd	NCAA Regional
2003	Elon	34–23–2	12–7	t-2nd	Big South Tournament
Elon:			48–34		
Elon Phoenix (Southern Conference) (2004–2014)
2004	Elon	31–28	17–13	4th	SoCon tournament
2005	Elon	32–25	18–12	t-3rd	SoCon tournament
2006	Elon	45–18	21–6	1st	NCAA Regional
2007	Elon	32–29	15–12	3rd	SoCon tournament (Note: In this season, all members of the Southern Conference qualified for the conference tournament.)
2008	Elon	44–18	19–8	1st	NCAA Regional
2009	Elon	41–18	23–4	1st	NCAA Regional
2010	Elon	38–24	19–11	t-3rd	NCAA Regional
2011	Elon	36–21	23–7	1st	SoCon tournament
2012	Elon	33–26	20–10	3rd	SoCon tournament
2013	Elon	34–30	18–11	t-2nd	NCAA Regional
2014	Elon	27–26	12–15	7th	SoCon tournament
Elon:			205–109		
Elon Phoenix (Colonial Athletic Association) (2015–present)
2015	Elon	25–28	13–11	4th	CAA tournament
2016	Elon	25–29	13–10	3rd	CAA tournament
2017	Elon	24–32	12–12	6th	CAA tournament
2018	Elon	36–23	16–8	2nd	CAA tournament
2019	Elon	33–24	19–5	1st	CAA tournament
2020	Elon	7–10	0–0		Season canceled due to COVID-19
2021	Elon	22–22	10–8	2nd (South)	CAA tournament
2022	Elon	27–28	9–14	7th	CAA tournament
2023	Elon	33–22	19–9	2nd	CAA tournament
2024	Elon	21–32	10–17	10th	
2025	Elon	25–32	13–14	6th	CAA tournament
2026	Elon	20–33	10–20	9th	
Elon:		902–749–3 (.546)	144–128 (.529)		
Total:		902–749–3 (.546)			
National champion Postseason invitational champion Conference regular season champion Conference regular season and conference tournament champion Division regular season champion Division regular season and conference tournament champion Conference tournament champion
