= 2022 Georgia Southern Eagles baseball team =

American college baseball season

2022 Georgia Southern Eagles baseball

Statesboro Regional, 1–2
- Conference: Sun Belt Conference

Ranking
- Coaches: No. 24
- CB: No. 30
- Record: 41–20 (23–7 SBC)
- Head coach: Rodney Hennon (22nd season)
- Assistant coaches: Alan Beck; A. J. Battisto
- Home stadium: J. I. Clements Stadium

2022 Sun Belt Conference baseball standings
	Conf.						Overall
Team	W		L		T	PCT	W		L		T	PCT
No. 13 Texas State ‍†‍‍^{y}	26	–	4	–	0	.867	47	–	14	–	0	.770
No. 21 Georgia Southern ‍‍‍^{y}	23	–	7	–	0	.767	41	–	20	–	0	.672
Coastal Carolina ‍‍‍^{y}	21	–	8	–	1	.717	39	–	20	–	1	.658
Louisiana ‍‍‡‍^{y}	19	–	11	–	0	.633	37	–	23	–	0	.617
South Alabama ‍‍‍	17	–	13	–	0	.567	31	–	23	–	0	.574
Troy ‍‍‍	15	–	15	–	0	.500	32	–	24	–	0	.571
Georgia State ‍‍‍	15	–	15	–	0	.500	30	–	27	–	0	.526
Little Rock ‍‍‍	11	–	18	–	0	.379	24	–	27	–	0	.471
Appalachian State ‍‍‍	10	–	20	–	0	.333	20	–	33	–	0	.377
Louisiana–Monroe ‍‍‍	9	–	20	–	1	.317	20	–	35	–	1	.366
UT Arlington ‍‍‍	7	–	23	–	0	.233	15	–	39	–	0	.278
Arkansas State ‍‍‍	5	–	24	–	0	.172	11	–	38	–	0	.224
† – Conference champion ‡ – Tournament champion y – Invited to the NCAA tournament Rankings from D1Baseball

The 2022 Georgia Southern Eagles baseball team represented Georgia Southern University during the 2022 NCAA Division I baseball season. The Eagles played their home games at J. I. Clements Stadium and were led by twenty-second year head coach Rodney Hennon. They were members of the Sun Belt Conference.

== Preseason ==
=== Sun Belt Conference Coaches Poll ===
The Sun Belt Conference Coaches Poll was released on February 9, 2022. Georgia Southern was picked to finish second with 118 votes.

Coaches poll
Predicted finish	Team	Votes (1st place)
1	South Alabama	139 (7)
2	Georgia Southern	118
T3	Coastal Carolina	117 (3)
T3	Louisiana	117 (2)
5	UT Arlington	78
6	Troy	74
7	Texas State	71
8	Little Rock	63
9	Louisiana–Monroe	59
10	Appalachian State	38
11	Georgia State	34
12	Arkansas State	28

=== Preseason All-Sun Belt Team & Honors ===
- Miles Smith (USA, Sr, Pitcher)
- Hayden Arnold (LR, Sr, Pitcher)
- Tyler Tuthill (APP, Jr, Pitcher)
- Brandon Talley (LA, Sr, Pitcher)
- Caleb Bartolero (TROY, Jr, Catcher)
- Jason Swan (GASO, Sr, 1st Base)
- Luke Drumheller (APP, Jr, 2nd Base)
- Eric Brown (CCU, Jr, Shortstop)
- Ben Klutts (ARST, Sr, 3rd Base)
- Christian Avant (GASO, Sr, Outfielder)
- Josh Smith (GSU, Jr, Outfielder)
- Rigsby Mosley (TROY, Sr, Outfielder)
- Cameron Jones (GSU, So, Utility)
- Noah Ledford (GASO, Jr, Designated Hitter)

== Personnel ==
2022 Georgia Southern Eagles baseball team
Players
Coaches

#	Pos.	Name	B/T	Height	Weight	Year	Home town
00	INF	Jarrett Jenkins (redshirt)	R/R	5 ft 11 in (1.8 m)	185 lb (84 kg)	Fr	Auburn, Georgia
2	INF	Jason Shaw	R/R	6 ft 1 in (1.85 m)	184 lb (83 kg)	Sr	Jacksonville, Florida
3	C	Chandler Davis	L/R	6 ft 0 in (1.83 m)	202 lb (92 kg)	Jr	Eastman, Georgia
4	C	Kyler Hultgren	L/R	5 ft 11 in (1.8 m)	186 lb (84 kg)	Jr	Pensacola, Florida
5	INF	Jesse Sherrill	L/R	6 ft 2 in (1.88 m)	170 lb (77 kg)	Jr	Pensacola, Florida
6	OF	Noah Searcy	R/L	6 ft 1 in (1.85 m)	214 lb (97 kg)	Sr	Jacksonville, Florida
8	INF	Sam Blancato (redshirt)	S/R	5 ft 10 in (1.78 m)	180 lb (82 kg)	So	Marietta, Georgia
11	RHP	Jeremy Gay	R/R	6 ft 2 in (1.88 m)	190 lb (86 kg)	Fr	Millen, Georgia
12	OF	Parker Biederer	L/L	5 ft 10 in (1.78 m)	177 lb (80 kg)	Sr	Cumming, Georgia
13	C	JP Tighe	R/R	6 ft 1 in (1.85 m)	198 lb (90 kg)	Jr	Dalton, Georgia
14	INF	Jarrett Brown	R/R	6 ft 1 in (1.85 m)	179 lb (81 kg)	So	Savannah, Georgia
16	LHP	Braden Hays	R/L	6 ft 3 in (1.91 m)	209 lb (95 kg)	Jr	Stone Mountain, Georgia
17	LHP	Danny Madden	L/L	6 ft 2 in (1.88 m)	215 lb (98 kg)	Sr	Corning, New York
21	OF	J. C. Peacher (redshirt)	L/L	6 ft 1 in (1.85 m)	170 lb (77 kg)	Fr	Pace, Florida
22	INF	Austin Thompson	R/R	5 ft 10 in (1.78 m)	181 lb (82 kg)	Sr	Rincon, Georgia
23	INF	Blake Evans	L/R	5 ft 10 in (1.78 m)	172 lb (78 kg)	Jr	Acworth, Georgia
25	RHP	Ga'Von Wray	R/R	6 ft 4 in (1.93 m)	215 lb (98 kg)	So	Douglasville, Georgia
26	LHP	Jay Thompson	L/L	6 ft 3 in (1.91 m)	207 lb (94 kg)	Jr	Cumming, Georgia
27	LHP	Ty Fisher	L/L	6 ft 4 in (1.93 m)	215 lb (98 kg)	So	Tunnel Hill, Georgia
28	INF	Noah Ledford (redshirt)	S/R	6 ft 1 in (1.85 m)	252 lb (114 kg)	Jr	Buford, Georgia
29	C	Sean White	R/R	6 ft 1 in (1.85 m)	200 lb (91 kg)	Fr	Peachtree City, Georgia
30	RHP	Ben Johnson	R/R	6 ft 3 in (1.91 m)	165 lb (75 kg)	So	Tucker, Georgia
31	LHP	Will Robbins	L/L	5 ft 11 in (1.8 m)	185 lb (84 kg)	Fr	Cumming, Georgia
32	RHP	Brooks Gorman	L/R	6 ft 2 in (1.88 m)	191 lb (87 kg)	So	Macon, Georgia
33	RHP	Thomas Ross	R/R	6 ft 3 in (1.91 m)	200 lb (91 kg)	So	Watkinsville, Georgia
34	OF	Will Patota	L/R	6 ft 3 in (1.91 m)	230 lb (104 kg)	Jr	Suwanee, Georgia
35	LHP	Hayden Harris	L/L	6 ft 0 in (1.83 m)	186 lb (84 kg)	Sr	Grovetown, Georgia
36	LHP	Anthony DiMola (redshirt)	L/L	6 ft 0 in (1.83 m)	185 lb (84 kg)	Fr	Cumming, Georgia
37	LHP	Declan Dun	R/L	6 ft 2 in (1.88 m)	165 lb (75 kg)	Fr	Peachtree City, Georgia
38	C	JD Kaiser	L/R	6 ft 1 in (1.85 m)	225 lb (102 kg)	Fr	Statesboro, Georgia
39	INF	Carson Mynatt	R/R	6 ft 2 in (1.88 m)	187 lb (85 kg)	Fr	Canton, Georgia
40	INF	Phillip Ard	R/R	6 ft 3 in (1.91 m)	200 lb (91 kg)	Fr	Bishop, Georgia
41	OF	Christian Avant	R/R	6 ft 0 in (1.83 m)	175 lb (79 kg)	Sr	Tifton, Georgia
42	INF	Jaylen Paden	R/R	5 ft 10 in (1.78 m)	175 lb (79 kg)	So	Lilburn, Georgia
43	OF	Preston Gunnell	R/R	6 ft 1 in (1.85 m)	185 lb (84 kg)	Fr	Canton, Georgia
44	RHP	Thomas Higgins	R/R	6 ft 1 in (1.85 m)	180 lb (82 kg)	Fr	Baxley, Georgia
46	LHP	Brett Zerbel	L/L	5 ft 11 in (1.8 m)	199 lb (90 kg)	Fr	Augusta, Georgia
47	RHP	Jake Martin	R/R	6 ft 5 in (1.96 m)	188 lb (85 kg)	So	Newnan, Georgia
50	RHP	Rem Maxwell	R/R	6 ft 2 in (1.88 m)	190 lb (86 kg)	Fr	Atlanta, Georgia
55	INF	Corey Dowdell (redshirt)	R/R	6 ft 3 in (1.91 m)	306 lb (139 kg)	Fr	Kingsland, Georgia
	RHP	Pax Briley III	R/R	6 ft 3 in (1.91 m)	195 lb (88 kg)	Fr	Suwanee, Georgia
	RHP	Troy Britts	R/R	6 ft 0 in (1.83 m)	205 lb (93 kg)	Jr	Orange Park, Florida

Head coach

Rodney Hennon (Western Carolina)

Assistant coach(es)

Hitting coach(es)

Alan Beck (Western Carolina)

Pitching coach(es)

A. J. Battisto (University of Phoenix)

Legend

- (C) Team captain
- (S) Suspended
- (I) Ineligible
- Injured
- Current redshirt

Roster
Last update: 31 March 2022

== Schedule and results ==
Legend
	Georgia Southern win
	Georgia Southern loss
	Postponement/Cancelation/Suspensions
**Bold**	Georgia Southern team member

2022 Georgia Southern Eagles baseball game log
Regular season (38–17)

February (2–5)
Date	Opponent	Rank	Site/stadium	Score	Win	Loss	Save	TV	Attendance	Overall record	SBC record
Feb. 18	at No. 19 Tennessee		Lindsey Nelson Stadium • Knoxville, TN	**L** 0–9	Burns (1–0)	**Fisher** (0–1)	None	SECN+	4,335	0–1	—
Feb. 19	at No. 19 Tennessee		Lindsey Nelson Stadium • Knoxville, TN	**L** 3–10	Smith (1–0)	**Higgins** (0–1)	None	SECN+	4,651	0–2	—
Feb. 20	at No. 19 Tennessee		Lindsey Nelson Stadium • Knoxville, TN	**L** 0–14	Sewell (1–0)	**Johnson** (0–1)	None	SECN+	4,580	0–3	—
Feb. 22	No. 19 Georgia Tech		J. I. Clements Stadium • Statesboro, GA	**W** 10–6	**Higgins** (1–1)	Marquis (0–1)	**Thompson** (1)	ESPN+	2,722	1–3	—
Feb. 25	UCF		J. I. Clements Stadium • Statesboro, GA	**L** 1–5	Litchfield (2–0)	**Ross** (0–1)	None	ESPN+	2,113	1–4	—
Feb. 26	UCF		J. I. Clements Stadium • Statesboro, GA	**W** 3–2	**Martin** (1–0)	Vespi (0–1)	None	ESPN+	2,176	2–4	—
Feb. 27	UCF		J. I. Clements Stadium • Statesboro, GA	**L** 1–10	Patterson (2–0)	**Higgins** (1–2)	None	ESPN+	1,617	2–5	—

March (15–3)
Date	Opponent	Rank	Site/stadium	Score	Win	Loss	Save	TV	Attendance	Overall record	SBC record
Mar. 1	at Jacksonville		John Sessions Stadium • Jacksonville, FL	**W** 13–7	**Wray** (1–0)	Long (0–1)	None		324	3–5	—
Mar. 4	Miami (OH)		J. I. Clements Stadium • Statesboro, GA	**W** 4–3	**Paden** (1–0)	Brand (0–1)	**Thompson** (2)	ESPN+	1,861	4–5	—
Mar. 5	Miami (OH)		J. I. Clements Stadium • Statesboro, GA	**W** 9–8^{10}	**Ross** (1–0)	Mastrian (0–1)	None	ESPN+	1,729	5–5	—
Mar. 6	Miami (OH)		J. I. Clements Stadium • Statesboro, GA	**W** 10–9	**Wray** (2–0)	Demonica (0–1)	None	ESPN+	1,590	6–5	—
Mar. 8	vs. No. 20 Georgia		SRP Park • North Augusta, GA	**W** 13–5	**Wray** (3–0)	Polk (0–1)	None		5,765	7–5	—
Mar. 9	No. 20 Georgia		J. I. Clements Stadium • Statesboro, GA	**L** 1–5	Marsh (1–0)	**Ross** (1–2)	None	ESPN+	2,747	7–6	—
Mar. 11	William & Mary		J. I. Clements Stadium • Statesboro, GA	**W** 7–3	**Paden** (2–0)	Lovasz (1–1)	**Higgins** (1)	ESPN+	1,404	8–6	—
Mar. 12	William & Mary		J. I. Clements Stadium • Statesboro, GA	**W** 6–2	**Johnson** (1–1)	Green (0–1)	**Thompson** (3)	ESPN+	1,357	9–6	—
Mar. 13	William & Mary		J. I. Clements Stadium • Statesboro, GA	**W** 7–3	**Wray** (4–0)	Cone (2–1)	None	ESPN+	1,423	10–6	—
Mar. 16	at Mercer		OrthoGeorgia Park • Macon, GA	**W** 8–3	**Thompson** (1–0)	Lobus (1–1)	None	ESPN+	979	11–6	—
Mar. 18	at Appalachian State		Beaver Field at Jim and Bettie Smith Stadium • Boone, NC	**W** 7–6	**Paden** (3–0)	Tuthill (1–5)	**Thompson** (4)	ESPN+	412	12–6	1–0
Mar. 19	at Appalachian State		Beaver Field at Jim and Bettie Smith Stadium • Boone, NC	**W** 5–2	**Fisher** (1–1)	Hamilton (1–2)	None	ESPN+	833	13–6	2–0
Mar. 20	at Appalachian State		Beaver Field at Jim and Bettie Smith Stadium • Boone, NC	**L** 6–11	Tujetsch (1–0)	**Johnson** (1–2)	None	ESPN+	390	13–7	2–1
Mar. 22	College of Charleston		J. I. Clements Stadium • Statesboro, GA	**W** 4–1	**Wray** (5–0)	Smith (0–1)	**Martin** (1)	ESPN+	2,707	14–7	—
Mar. 25	Arkansas State		J. I. Clements Stadium • Statesboro, GA	**W** 7–4	**Higgins** (2–2)	Charlton (0–1)	**Thompson** (5)	ESPN+	1,697	15–7	3–1
Mar. 26	Arkansas State		J. I. Clements Stadium • Statesboro, GA	**W** 12–2	**Fisher** (2–1)	Nash (1–2)	None	ESPN+	2,055	16–7	4–1
Mar. 27	Arkansas State		J. I. Clements Stadium • Statesboro, GA	**W** 7–6	**Thompson** (2–0)	Anderson (0–3)	None	ESPN+	1,662	17–7	5–1
Mar. 29	at No. 23 Georgia		Foley Field • Athens, GA	**L** 2–7	Bearden (1–0)	**Madden** (0–1)	None	SECN+	3,912	17–8	—

April (11–7)
Date	Opponent	Rank	Site/stadium	Score	Win	Loss	Save	TV	Attendance	Overall record	SBC record
Apr. 1	at Louisiana		M. L. Tigue Moore Field at Russo Park • Lafayette, LA	**L** 3–6	Ray (2–2)	**Thompson** (2–1)	Menard (3)	ESPN+	4,102	17–9	5–2
Apr. 2	at Louisiana		M. L. Tigue Moore Field at Russo Park • Lafayette, LA	**W** 4–3	**Johnson** (2–2)	Menard (2–1)	None	ESPN+	4,089	18–9	6–2
Apr. 3	at Louisiana		M. L. Tigue Moore Field at Russo Park • Lafayette, LA	**L** 1–5	Wilson (2–1)	**Wray** (5–1)	None		3,986	18–10	6–3
Apr. 6	Kennesaw State		J. I. Clements Stadium • Statesboro, GA	Game postponed							
Apr. 8	at No. 10 Texas State		Bobcat Ballpark • San Marcos, TX	**W** 7–4^{11}	**Johnson** (3–2)	Stivors (3–1)	None	ESPN+	1,608	19–10	7–3
Apr. 9	at No. 10 Texas State		Bobcat Ballpark • San Marcos, TX	**L** 11–13	Martin (1–0)	**Zabel** (0–1)	Wray (1)		1,662	19–11	7–4
Apr. 10	at No. 10 Texas State		Bobcat Ballpark • San Marcos, TX	**W** 10–9	**Stivors** (4–1)	Johnson (3–3)	None		1,095	20–11	8–4
Apr. 12	at Presbyterian		Presbyterian Baseball Complex • Clinton, SC	**W** 9–7 (10 inns)	**Wray** (6–1)	Eagen (1–4)	None		148	21–11	—
Apr. 14	Georgia State		J. I. Clements Stadium • Statesboro, GA	**W** 4–2	**Thompson** (3–1)	Patel (1–1)	None	ESPN+	1,780	22–11	9–4
Apr. 15	Georgia State		J. I. Clements Stadium • Statesboro, GA	**W** 11–1	**Paden** (4–0)	Dawson (2–3)	None	ESPN+	1,694	23–11	10–4
Apr. 16	Georgia State		J. I. Clements Stadium • Statesboro, GA	**W** 10–8	**Johnson** (4–3)	Jones (1–2)	None	ESPN+	1,650	24–11	11–4
Apr. 20	at Florida State	No. 25	Mike Martin Field at Dick Howser Stadium • Tallahassee, FL	**L** 5–6^{11}	Montgomery (4–1)	**Martin** (2–1)	None	ACCN+	4,219	24–12	—
Apr. 22	at South Alabama	No. 25	Eddie Stanky Field • Mobile, AL	**W** 5–4	**Thompson** (4–1)	Smith (5–2)	None	ESPN+	1,217	25–12	12–4
Apr. 23	at South Alabama	No. 25	Eddie Stanky Field • Mobile, AL	**W** 7–4	**Paden** (5–0)	Booker (3–2)	**Johnson** (1)	ESPN+	1,808	26–12	13–4
Apr. 24	at South Alabama	No. 25	Eddie Stanky Field • Mobile, AL	**W** 7–2	**Wray** (7–1)	Lehrmann (2–2)	**Thompson** (6)	ESPN+	1,159	27–12	14–4
Apr. 26	Kennesaw State	No. 24	J. I. Clements Stadium • Statesboro, GA	**L** 3–5	Riggins (1–0)	**Thompson** (4–2)	Rine (6)	ESPN+	1,619	27–13	—
Apr. 27	Kennesaw State	No. 24	J. I. Clements Stadium • Statesboro, GA	**W** 9–6	**Madden** (1–1)	Housley (0–2)	**Johnson** (2)	ESPN+	1,655	28–13	—
Apr. 29	Coastal Carolina	No. 24	J. I. Clements Stadium • Statesboro, GA	**L** 4–5	VanScoter (7–2)	**Fisher** (2–2)	Maniscalco (1)	ESPN+	2,032	28–14	14–5
Apr. 30	Coastal Carolina	No. 24	J. I. Clements Stadium • Statesboro, GA	**L** 4–6	Knorr (4–0)	**Paden** (5–1)	Maton (2)	ESPN+	2,258	28–15	14–6

May (10–2)
Date	Opponent	Rank	Site/stadium	Score	Win	Loss	Save	TV	Attendance	Overall record	SBC record
May 1	Coastal Carolina	No. 24	J. I. Clements Stadium • Statesboro, GA	**W** 3–2	**DiMola** (1–0)	Parker (3–3)	**Madden** (1)	ESPN+	1,651	29–15	15–6
May 7	Troy		J. I. Clements Stadium • Statesboro, GA	**W** 24–1	**Fisher** (3–2)	Fuller (4–2)	None	ESPN+	1,527	30–15	16–6
May 7	Troy		J. I. Clements Stadium • Statesboro, GA	**W** 8–4	**Thompson** (5–2)	Stewart (4–3)	None	ESPN+	1,710	31–15	17–6
May 8	Troy		J. I. Clements Stadium • Statesboro, GA	**W** 10–9	**Martin** (3–1)	Fuller (2–1)	**Madden** (2)	ESPN+	1,642	32–15	18–6
May 11	at Georgia Tech		Russ Chandler Stadium • Atlanta, GA	**L** 12–13	McNamee (1–0)	**Thompson** (5–3)	None	ACCN+	1,526	32–16	—
May 13	at Little Rock		Gary Hogan Field • Little Rock, AR	**W** 13–2	**Fisher** (4–2)	Arnold (4–6)	None	ESPN+	231	33–16	19–6
May 14	at Little Rock		Gary Hogan Field • Little Rock, AR	**L** 6–7	Quevedo (2–0)	**Paden** (5–2)	Smallwood (4)		281	33–17	19–7
May 15	at Little Rock		Gary Hogan Field • Little Rock, AR	**W** 14–6^{7}	**Thompson** (6–3)	Weatherley (1–3)	None		176	34–17	20–7
May 17	Mercer		J. I. Clements Stadium • Statesboro, GA	**W** 21–7	**Madden** (2–1)	Franklin (3–2)	None	ESPN+	1,591	35–17	
May 19	UT Arlington		J. I. Clements Stadium • Statesboro, GA	**W** 5–3	**Fisher** (5–2)	King (2–6)	**Martin** (2)	ESPN+	1,712	36–17	21–7
May 20	UT Arlington		J. I. Clements Stadium • Statesboro, GA	**W** 18–9	**Paden** (6–2)	Wong (1–7)	None	ESPN+	1,426	37–17	22–7
May 21	UT Arlington		J. I. Clements Stadium • Statesboro, GA	**W** 12–1^{7}	**Harris** (1–0)	Winquest (2–4)	None	ESPN+	1,877	38–17	23–7

Postseason (3–3)

SBC Tournament (2–1)
Date	Opponent	(Seed)/Rank	Site/stadium	Score	Win	Loss	Save	TV	Attendance	Overall record	SBCT Record
May 27	vs. (9) Appalachian State	(2)	Montgomery Riverwalk Stadium • Montgomery, AL	**W** 7–1	**Thompson** (7–3)	Tujetsch (3–5)	None	ESPN+		39–17	1–0
May 28	vs. (6) Troy	(2)	Montgomery Riverwalk Stadium • Montgomery, AL	**W** 8–0	**Johnson** (5–3)	Gainous (5–4)	None	ESPN+		40–17	2–0
May 29	vs. (4) Louisiana	(2)	Montgomery Riverwalk Stadium • Montgomery, AL	**L** 6–7	Hammond (3–1)	**Higgins** (2–3)	Talley (2)	ESPN+		40–18	2–1

NCAA tournament (1–2)
Date	Opponent	(Seed)/Rank	Site/stadium	Score	Win	Loss	Save	TV	Attendance	Overall record	NCAAT record
Statesboro Regionals
Jun. 3	vs. (4) UNC Greensboro	(1) No. 21	J. I. Clements Stadium • Statesboro, GA	**W** 8–0	**Fisher** (6–2)	Parsley (10–5)	None	ESPN+	2,182	41–18	1–0
Jun. 4	vs. (2) No. 17 Notre Dame	(1) No. 21	J. I. Clements Stadium • Statesboro, GA	**L** 4–6	Bedford (1–0)	**Thompson** (7–4)	Findlay (1)	ESPN+	3,533	41–19	1–1
Jun. 5	vs. (3) No. 24 Texas Tech	(1) No. 21	J. I. Clements Stadium • Statesboro, GA	**L** 1–3	Morris (8–2)	**Madden** (2–2)	Molina (1)	ESPN+	2,107	41–20	1–2

Schedule source:

*Rankings are based on the team's current ranking in the D1Baseball poll.

== Statesboro Regional ==
Statesboro Regional Teams
(1) Georgia Southern Eagles	(2) Notre Dame Fighting Irish	(3) Texas Tech Red Raiders	(4) UNC Greensboro Spartans

First Round
1	No. 21 Georgia Southern	8
4	UNC Greensboro	0
3	No. 24 Texas Tech	2
2	No. 17 Notre Dame	3
Lower round 1
4	UNC Greensboro	0
3	No. 24 Texas Tech	2

Semi-Finals
1	No. 21 Georgia Southern	4
2	No. 17 Notre Dame	6
Lower final
1	No. 21 Georgia Southern	1
3	No. 24 Texas Tech	3

Finals
3	No. 24 Texas Tech	1	–
2	No. 17 Notre Dame	2	–

== Postseason ==
=== Conference Awards ===
All Conference First Team

- Reid VanScoter (CCU, RS-Sr, P)
- Levi Wells (TXST, So, P)
- Zeke Woods (TXST, Jr, P)
- Tristan Stivors (TXST, Sr, RP)
- Julian Brock (LA, So, C)
- Carson Roccaforte (LA, So, 1B)
- Jesse Sherrill (GASO, Jr, 2B)
- Dalton Shuffield (TXST, Sr, SS)
- Justin Thompson (TXST, Sr, 3B)
- Max Ryerson (GSU, Jr, OF)
- Mason Holt (ULM, Sr, OF)
- Miles Simington (USA, Sr, OF)
- Cameron Jones (GSU, So, UT)
- Noah Ledford (GASO, RS-Jr, DH)

All Conference Second Team

- Hayden Arnold (LR, Sr, P)
- Michael Knorr (CCU, Sr, P)
- Matt Boswell (USA, Sr, P)
- Jay Thomspon (GASO, Jr, RP)
- Hayden Cross (APP, Jr, C)
- Jason Swan (GASO, Sr, 1B)
- Erick Orbeta (USA, RS-So, 2B)
- Griffin Cheney (GSU, Gr, SS)
- Dale Thomas (CCU, Jr, 3B)
- Noah Dickerson (LR, RS-Jr, OF)
- Jose Gonzalez (TXST, Jr, OF)
- John Wuthrich (TXST, Sr, OF)
- Rigsby Mosley (TROY, Sr, UT)
- Tyler Johnson (CCU, Sr, DH)

=== National & Regional ===
Accolade	Recipient	Reference
NCBWA Third Team All-American	Noah Ledford, DH	
ABCA Second Team All-American	Noah Ledford, DH	
ABCA First Team All-Region	Noah Ledford, DH	
ABCA Second Team All-Region	Jesse Sherrill, INF	

== Rankings ==
Ranking movements Legend: ██ Increase in ranking ██ Decrease in ranking — = Not ranked RV = Received votes
	Week																
Poll	Pre	1	2	3	4	5	6	7	8	9	10	11	12	13	14	15	Final
Coaches'	—	—*	—	—	—	—	RV	RV	RV	RV	25	RV	RV	RV	25	24	
Baseball America	—	—	—	—	—	—	—	—	—	19	17	—	—	—	—	—	
Collegiate Baseball^	RV	—	—	—	—	—	—	—	—	—	—	—	—	—	—	30	
NCBWA†	—	—	—	—	—	—	—	—	—	29	24	—	—	—	—	29	
D1Baseball	—	—	—	—	—	—	—	—	—	25	24	—	—	—	—	21	

^ Collegiate Baseball ranked 40 teams in their preseason poll, but only ranked 30 teams weekly during the season.
† NCBWA ranks 30 teams in their preseason poll, but only ranks 25 teams weekly during the season.
* A new poll was not released for this week, so for comparison purposes, the previous week's ranking is inserted in this week's slot.
