= List of The Citadel Bulldogs head baseball coaches =

The Citadel Bulldogs baseball program is a college baseball team that represents The Citadel, The Military College of South Carolina in the Southern Conference. The Bulldogs compete in the National Collegiate Athletic Association (NCAA) Division I.

The Citadel did not begin keeping complete records for its baseball program until 1954, after seven schools left the SoCon to form the Atlantic Coast Conference. Known records for full seasons are listed below. Partial season records are not included.

There have been 29 head baseball coaches at The Citadel, many of whom also coached football and/or basketball. Of coaches with known records, Fred Jordan has won the most games with 831. "Rip" Simpson recorded the highest winning percentage, at .833 in 1908. Of coaches with more than one season at the helm, Mack Erwin's .672 winning percentage is the highest. Chal Port coached for 27 seasons, the longest of any coach.

== Key ==
General
#	Number of coaches (Note: A running total of the number of head coaches.)
GC	Games coached
†	Elected to the National College Baseball Hall of Fame

Overall
OW	Wins
OL	Losses
OT	Ties
O%	Winning percentage

Conference (Note: The Citadel was a member of the Southern Intercollegiate Athletic Association from 1908 until 1936, but the conference did not sponsor baseball. The Southern Conference did not sponsor baseball until 1947.)
CW	Wins
CL	Losses
CT	Ties
C%	Winning percentage

Postseason (Note: Postseason play involving the NCAA Division I Baseball Championship.)
PA	Total Appearances (Note: Postseason appearances include seasons with NCAA Division I Baseball Championship bids since the tournament began in 1947.)
PW	Total Wins
PL	Total Losses
WA	College World Series appearances (Note: College World Series appearances include seasons with CWS bids since the tournament began in 1947.)
WW	College World Series wins
WL	College World Series losses

Championships
DC	Division regular season (Note: The Southern Conference used divisions from 1969 to 1970 and 1984 to 1988.)
CC	Conference regular season
CT	Conference tournament (Note: The Southern Conference held a tournament from 1950 until 1953 and resumed the tournament in 1984.)

== Coaches ==
List of head baseball coaches showing season(s) coached, overall records, conference records, postseason records, championships and selected awards*Statistics correct as of the end of the 2026 NCAA Division I baseball season
#	Name	Term (Note: The Citadel did not sponsor a baseball team from 1932 to 1934 or 1941 to 1946.)	GC	OW	OL	OT	O%	CW	CL	CT	C%	PA	PW	PL	WA	WW	WL	DCs	CCs	CTs	NCs	Awards (Note: National, regional and conference coach of the year awards.)
1	Unknown	1899–1904, 1906, 1913, 1939–1940	16	8	8	0	.500	—	—	—	—	—	—	—	—	—	—	—	—	—	0	—
2	Mr. Gunner	1905	—	—	—	—	—	—	—	—	—	—	—	—	—	—	—	—	—	—	0	—
3	J. W. Moore	1907	—	—	—	—	—	—	—	—	—	—	—	—	—	—	—	—	—	—	0	—
4	O. B. "Rip" Simpson	1908	6	5	1	0	.833	—	—	—	—	—	—	—	—	—	—	—	—	—	0	—
5	Babe Brothers	1909	—	—	—	—	—	—	—	—	—	—	—	—	—	—	—	—	—	—	0	—
6	George A. Schmick	1910	10	4	6	0	.400	—	—	—	—	—	—	—	—	—	—	—	—	—	0	—
7	Barney Legge	1911	8	2	5	1	.313	—	—	—	—	—	—	—	—	—	—	—	—	—	0	—
8	Ralph McLaurin	1912	—	—	—	—	—	—	—	—	—	—	—	—	—	—	—	—	—	—	0	—
9	George C. Rogers	1914–1915, 1921–1924	62	26	36	0	.419	—	—	—	—	—	—	—	—	—	—	—	—	—	0	—
10	Thomas S. McMillan	1916, 1919	20	8	12	0	.400	—	—	—	—	—	—	—	—	—	—	—	—	—	0	—
11	Harry J. O'Brien	1917–1918	12	3	9	0	.250	—	—	—	—	—	—	—	—	—	—	—	—	—	0	—
12	Ed Sabre	1920	4	3	1	0	.750	—	—	—	—	—	—	—	—	—	—	—	—	—	0	—
13	Bulldog Drummond	1925	9	2	7	0	.222	—	—	—	—	—	—	—	—	—	—	—	—	—	0	—
14	H. L. "Matty" Matthews	1926–1930, 1937–1938	36	10	25	1	.292	—	—	—	—	—	—	—	—	—	—	—	—	—	0	—
15	Jimmy Floyd	1931	—	—	—	—	—	—	—	—	—	—	—	—	—	—	—	—	—	—	0	—
16	Tatum Gressette	1935	—	—	—	—	—	—	—	—	—	—	—	—	—	—	—	—	—	—	0	—
17	Red Smith	1936	—	—	—	—	—	—	—	—	—	—	—	—	—	—	—	—	—	—	0	—
18	Dusty Rhodes	1947	7	2	5	0	.286	—	—	—	—	—	—	—	—	—	—	—	0	—	0	—
19	Bunzy O'Neal	1948	13	6	7	0	.462	—	—	—	—	—	—	—	—	—	—	—	0	—	0	—
20	Jeff Clark	1949,1951	—	—	—	—	—	—	—	—	—	—	—	—	—	—	—	—	0	0	0	—
21	Jim Bailey	1950	—	—	—	—	—	—	—	—	—	—	—	—	—	—	—	—	0	0	0	—
22	John D. McMillan	1952–1953	20	9	11	0	.450	—	—	—	—	—	—	—	—	—	—	—	0	0	0	—
23	Fred Montsdeoca	1954–1956	64	31	33	0	.484	13	10	0	.565	—	—	—	—	—	—	—	0	—	0	—
24	Mack Erwin	1957–1960	93	62	30	1	.672	24	12	1	.662	1	1	2	0	—	—	—	1	—	0	—
25	Jim Newsome	1961–1964	80	37	43	0	.463	15	30	0	.333	—	—	—	—	—	—	—	—	—	0	—
26	Chal Port	1965–1991	1092	641	386	2	.624	240	156	1	.606	5	9	10	1	1	2	—	7	1	0	SN (1990); SoCon (1975, 79, 82, 83, 90, 91)
27	Fred Jordan	1992–2017	1537	831	706	0	.541	399	306	0	.566	7	4	14	0	0	0	—	5	7	0	SoCon (1995, 99, 2003, 10)
28	Tony Skole	2018–2024	339	123	216	0	.363	22	76	0	.229	0	0	0	0	0	0	—	0	0	0	—
29	Russell Triplett	2025–present	119	67	52	0	.563	23	19	0	.548	1	1	2	0	0	0	—	0	1	0	—
