= Randy Hood =

American baseball coach and player (born 1968)

Current position
- Title: Head coach
- Team: UNC Wilmington
- Conference: CAA
- Record: 182–119

Biographical details
- Born: August 9, 1968 (age 58); Goldsboro, North Carolina, U.S.

Playing career
- 1987–1990: Campbell
- 1990: Arizona League Brewers
- 1990–1991: Helena Brewers
- 1991: Stockton Ports
- 1991: Erie Sailors
- 1991: South Bend White Sox
- 1992–1993: Sarasota White Sox
- 1993: South Bend White Sox
- 1993–1994: Birmingham Barons
- Position: Outfielder

Coaching career (HC unless noted)
- 1996–2001: Campbell (asst.)
- 2002–2019: UNC Wilmington (asst.)
- 2020–present: UNC Wilmington

Head coaching record
- Overall: 182–119
- Tournaments: NCAA: 1–4

Accomplishments and honors

Championships
- 2x CAA Tournament (2023, 2024)

Randall Scott Hood (born August 9, 1968) is an American baseball coach and former player who is the current head baseball coach of the UNC Wilmington Seahawks. He played college baseball at Campbell for coach Mike Caldwell from 1987 to 1990 and played in Minor League Baseball (MiLB) for 5 seasons from 1990 to 1994.

== Playing career ==
Hood attended Southern Wayne High School in Dudley, North Carolina. Hood played for the school's varsity baseball team. Hood then enrolled at Campbell University, to play college baseball for the Campbell Fighting Camels baseball team.

As a freshman at Campbell University in 1987, Hood had a .290 batting average, a .365 on-base percentage (OBP) and a .420 SLG.

In the 1989 season as a junior, Hood hit 4 home runs and 10 doubles. He was named to the All-Big South Conference team.

Hood had his best season as a senior in 1990, leading the team in hits (60), stolen bases (26), batting average (.366) and on-base percentage (.490).

Hood then signed as an undrafted free agent with the Milwaukee Brewers organization, playing in 1990 and the beginning of 1991. He would then spend 3 1/2 seasons in the Chicago White Sox organization from 1991 to 1994 before going to spring training with the California Angels in 1995.

== Coaching career ==
After failing to make the Angels in 1995, Hood joined the coaching staff at Campbell University. In the fall of 2001, Hood joined Mark Scalf's staff at UNC Wilmington.

On April 29, 2019, Hood was named the successor for the retiring Scalf.

== Head coaching records ==
The following is a table of Hood's yearly records as an NCAA head coach.

Record table
Season	Team	Overall	Conference	Standing	Postseason
UNC Wilmington Seahawks (Colonial/Coastal Athletic Association) (2020–present)
2020	UNC Wilmington	11–5	0–0		Season canceled due COVID-19
2021	UNC Wilmington	32–22	13–8	1st (South)	CAA tournament
2022	UNC Wilmington	31–24	15–9	T-2nd	CAA tournament
2023	UNC Wilmington	34–23	20–8	1st	NCAA Regional
2024	UNC Wilmington	40–21	20–7	2nd	NCAA Regional
2025	UNC Wilmington	34–24	19–8	2nd	CAA tournament
UNC Wilmington:		182–119	87–40		
Total:		182–119 (.605)			
National champion Postseason invitational champion Conference regular season champion Conference regular season and conference tournament champion Division regular season champion Division regular season and conference tournament champion Conference tournament champion
