= John Gall (baseball) =

American baseball player (born 1978)

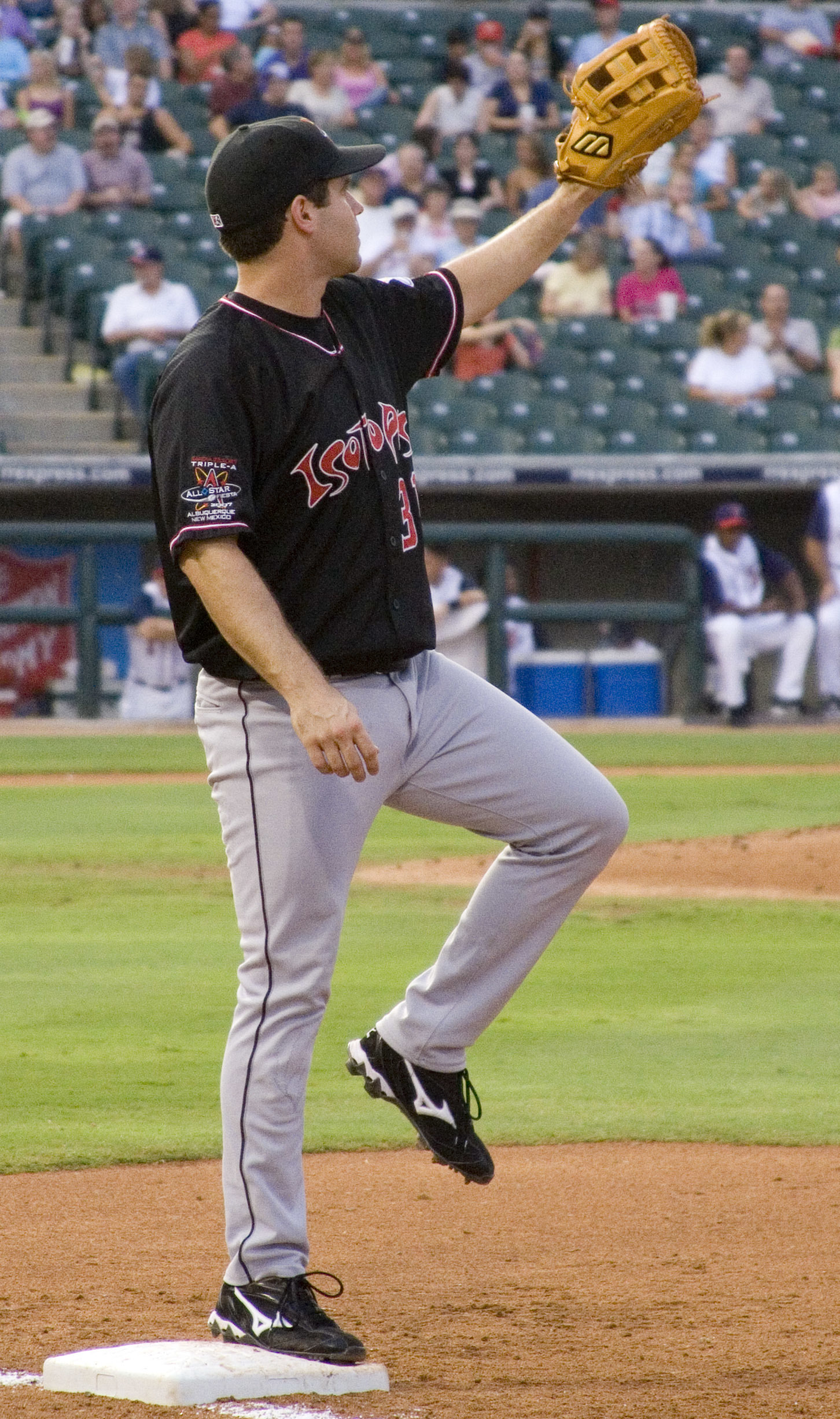
- Gall with the Albuquerque Isotopes in 2007

President of USA Baseball
- Incumbent
- Assumed office 23 December 2023
- Preceded by: Mike Gaski

Personal details
- Born: April 2, 1978 (age 48) Stanford, California, U.S.
- Baseball career
- Left fielder
- Batted: Right Threw: Right

MLB debut
- July 26, 2005, for the St. Louis Cardinals

Last MLB appearance
- May 17, 2007, for the Florida Marlins

MLB statistics
- Batting average: .245
- Home runs: 2
- Runs batted in: 11
- Stats at Baseball Reference

Teams
- St. Louis Cardinals (2005–2006); Lotte Giants (2006); Florida Marlins (2007)
Medals
Men's baseball
Representing United States
Olympic Games
Bronze medal – third place	2008 Beijing	Team

John Christopher Gall (born April 2, 1978) is an American baseball executive and former Major League Baseball left fielder who played for the St. Louis Cardinals and Florida Marlins from 2005 to 2007. He is the current president of USA Baseball, overseeing amateur baseball in the United States as well as the selection of the United States national baseball team.

== College ==
Gall was born in Stanford, California, and was a successful collegiate player for Stanford University, making his NCAA debut as a freshman in 1997. After the 1997 season, he played collegiate summer baseball with the Orleans Cardinals of the Cape Cod Baseball League. His best college year was as a sophomore in which he had a team-leading .381 batting average and 63 RBI, with 15 home runs, second only to former Padres outfielder Jody Gerut on the team. After his excellent junior year in 1999, Gall was selected by the Cleveland Indians in the 50th round of the 1999 Major League Baseball draft. However, Gall elected to return to college for his senior year, and was eventually selected by the St. Louis Cardinals in the 11th round of the 2000 draft. He played in 3 College World Series and was All-Tournament Team in 1999 while hitting .611. He is the All-Time Pac-12 leader in hits and RBI's.

== Professional career ==
After a season at Single-A ball, Gall played the 2002 season for the New Haven Ravens, the Double-A affiliate of the Cardinals at the time. Here he hit 20 home runs and 81 RBI with a .316 batting average. In 2003, Gall spent his first season with the Triple-A Memphis Redbirds, and collected 16 home runs and 73 RBI with a .312 average, numbers which were improved in 2004, as he added six home runs and eleven RBI to his 2003 totals.

On July 26, after a promising start to the 2005 season in Memphis, Gall was promoted for the first time to the major league roster, to replace Larry Walker, who was on the disabled list. In his debut against the San Diego Padres at Petco Park, Gall proceeded to go 2-for-4 with a double. He was sent back down to Memphis eight games later on August 9 having collected four hits, two doubles, and two RBI in his first stint as a major-leaguer. After another call-up, he was placed on the active roster for the 2005 Cardinal's playoff team. On July 17, 2006, the Cardinals released Gall and he signed with the Lotte Giants in Korea. Gall received a World Series ring for his stint with the St Louis Cardinals in 2006. He signed with the Florida Marlins on January 4, 2007. Gall spent much of the year with the Marlins Triple-A affiliate, the Albuquerque Isotopes, with a stint with the Florida Marlins.

Gall was named to the United States national baseball team for the 2008 Olympics in Beijing. Gall's success in the olympics, most notably for his home run over Taiwan which helped the United States get to the Bronze Medal round, got recognized by notable people including an appearance on The Oprah Winfrey Show, an invitation to the White House and serving as a guest of honor for California Governor, Arnold Schwarzenegger.

In January 2009, Gall signed a minor league contract with the Houston Astros. His last professional season was 2009. Gall also won a Liga del Pacifico Championship for the Venados de Mazatlan in 2005.

== Personal life ==
Gall currently resides in the Bay Area with his family. He is the cousin of former Arizona Diamondbacks and Seattle Mariners outfielder Eric Byrnes.
