= Corey Bird =

American baseball player (born 1995)

- Outfielder
- Born: August 11, 1995 (age 31); Charleston, West Virginia, U.S.
- Bats: Left Throws: Left
- Stats at Baseball Reference

Corey Thomas Bird (born August 11, 1995) is an American former professional baseball outfielder. He is a native of Elkview, West Virginia. Bird attended Herbert Hoover High School in Elkview, West Virginia, where he played basketball and baseball.

== Amateur career ==
As a senior in 2013, Bird led the Huskies to a 31-4 overall record and a Class AA State Title. He was named the Class AA state first-team captain, as well as both the Kanawha Valley and West Virginia Gatorade Player of the Year after batting .476 while also compiling a 1.08 ERA on the mound. In four season with the Huskies, he had a batting average of .457.

After graduating, he enrolled at Marshall University where he played college baseball for the Marshall Thundering Herd.As a freshman at Marshall in 2014, Bird started 44 games and batted .292 with 15 stolen bases. In 2015, as a sophomore, he hit .307 with one home run and 23 RBIs. That summer, he played in the Cape Cod Baseball League for the Hyannis Harbor Hawks, with whom he earned all-league honors. Bird started 55 games in center field as a junior in 2016, batting .300 with six doubles, a triple, 44 runs scored, 22 RBIs, and 34 stolen bases. Which led C-USA. He was named 2016 All-Conference USA second team and C-USA all-tournament teams.

After the season, he was selected by the Miami Marlins in the seventh round of the 2016 Major League Baseball draft.Becoming the third-highest draft pick in Marshall history and the first player selected by The Herd

== Professional career ==
=== Miami Marlins ===
Bird signed with Miami, making his professional debut with the Batavia Muckdogs of the Class A Short Season New York–Penn League, with whom he hit .237 with 18 RBIs and 16 stolen bases over 58 games. He was assigned to the Greensboro Grasshoppers of the Class A South Atlantic League to begin the 2017 season before being promoted to the Jupiter Hammerheads of the Class A-Advanced Florida State League. Over 110 games between both clubs, he batted .288 with two home runs, forty RBIs, and 28 stolen bases. In 2018, he struggled with injuries, and played in only 42 games for the year. In 2019, he began the year with Jupiter before he was promoted to the Jacksonville Jumbo Shrimp of the Class AA Southern League after two games. Over 97 games played for the 2019 season, Bird slashed .230/.284/.293 with three home runs, 29 RBIs, and 15 stolen bases. To begin the 2021 season, he returned to Jacksonville, now members of the Triple-A East.

On July 28, 2021, the Marlins promoted Bird to the major leagues. On July 31, he was designated for assignment without making an appearance. This made him a rare Phantom ballplayer upon his retirement. On August 2, he was outrighted back to Jacksonville, with whom he ended the year. Over 94 games, Bird slashed .239/.332/.382 with six home runs and 24 RBIs.

=== Charleston Dirty Birds ===
Bird retired from professional baseball on November 16, 2021. However, on June 22, 2022, he signed with the Charleston Dirty Birds of the Atlantic League of Professional Baseball. He retired again after playing 23 games for the Dirty Birds on July 23, 2022.

After retirement, he went on to become the Athletic Director at Covenant School in Huntington, WV.

== See also ==
- Phantom ballplayer
