= Joe Goddard =

Joe Goddard may refer to:

- Joe Goddard (musician) (born 1979), member of English band Hot Chip
- Joe Goddard (athlete) (1933–2019), Trinidadian Olympic sprinter
- Joe Goddard (boxer) (1857–1903), Australian boxer
- Joe Goddard (baseball) (born 1950), former Major League Baseball catcher
