= Tommy Gregg =

American baseball player (born 1963)

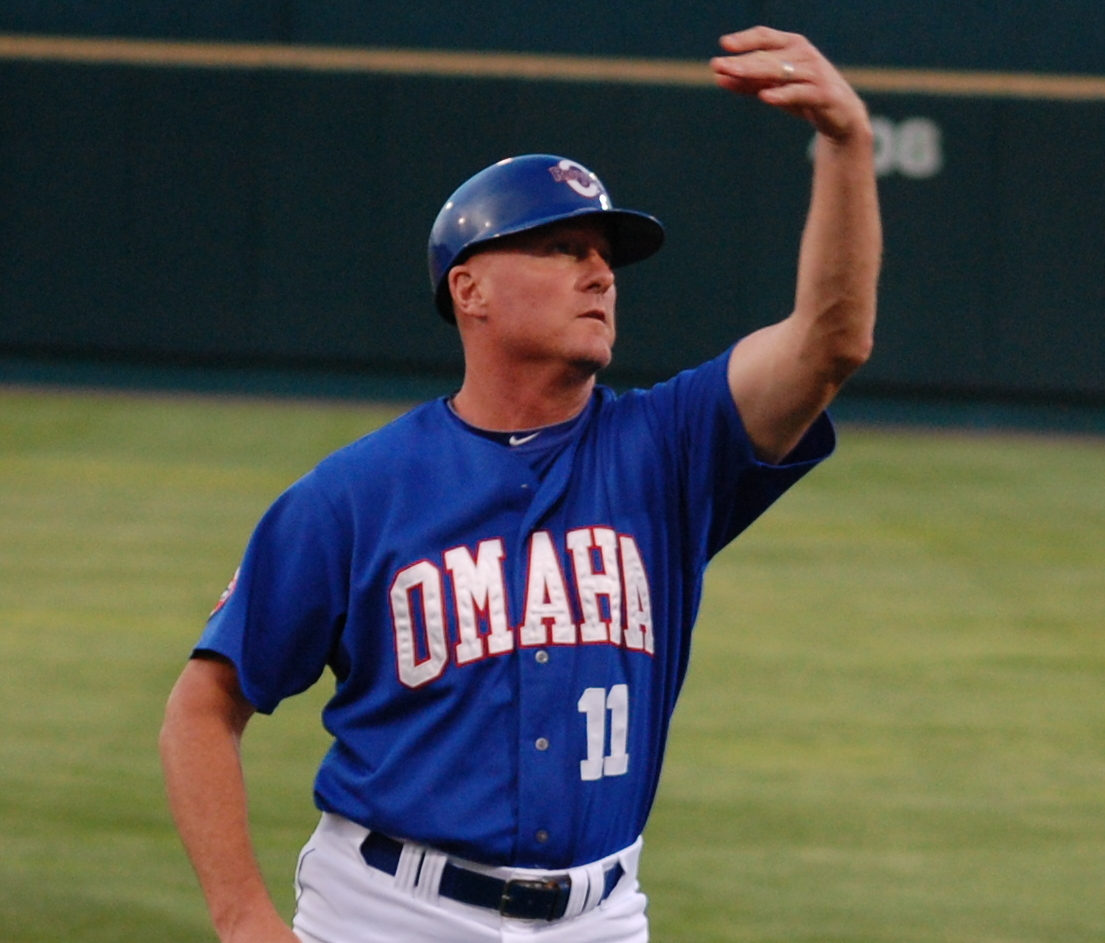
- Gregg as hitting coach of the Omaha Royals in 2010

Tri-State Coal Cats – No. 11
- Outfielder / First baseman
- Born: July 29, 1963 (age 62); Boone, North Carolina, U.S.
- Batted: Left Threw: Left

MLB debut
- September 14, 1987, for the Pittsburgh Pirates

Last MLB appearance
- September 28, 1997, for the Atlanta Braves

MLB statistics
- Batting average: .243
- Home runs: 20
- Runs batted in: 88
- Stats at Baseball Reference

Teams
- As player: Pittsburgh Pirates (1987–1988); Atlanta Braves (1988–1992); Cincinnati Reds (1993); Florida Marlins (1995); Atlanta Braves (1997); As manager: Tri-State Coal Cats (2024–present)

William Thomas Gregg (born July 29, 1963) is an American former Major League Baseball (MLB) outfielder/first baseman who played for the Pittsburgh Pirates, Atlanta Braves, Cincinnati Reds, and Florida Marlins from 1987 to 1997. He is currently the hitting coach for the independent Lincoln Saltdogs.

== Amateur career ==
Gregg attended Richard J. Reynolds High School in Winston-Salem, North Carolina. He played collegiately at Wake Forest University, where he studied psychology. In 1983, he played collegiate summer baseball with the Orleans Cardinals of the Cape Cod Baseball League and was named a league all-star.

== Professional career ==
He played in the majors from 1987 to 1997 for the Pittsburgh Pirates, Atlanta Braves, Cincinnati Reds, and Florida Marlins. He mostly played as an outfielder.

== Coaching career ==
He formerly served as the hitting coach for the Omaha Storm Chasers. Gregg was named as the hitting coach for the New Orleans Baby Cakes in the Miami Marlins organization for the 2018 and 2019 seasons. He became hitting coach of the Lincoln Saltdogs in January 2021.

In February 2024, it was announced that Gregg would take on the role of manager for the newly established Tri-State Coal Cats in Huntington, West Virginia, part of the Appalachian League.
