= Jack Cook (baseball) =

American baseball coach (1926–2021)

Biographical details
- Born: July 27, 1926; Huntington, West Virginia, U.S.
- Died: November 24, 2021 (aged 95); Huntington, West Virginia, U.S.
- Education: Marshall University

Coaching career (HC unless noted)
- 1955: Marshall
- 1967–1989: Marshall

Head coaching record
- Overall: 422–344–3
- Tournaments: NCAA: 2–4

Accomplishments and honors

Championships
- 2× SoCon regular season (1978, 1981)

Awards
- 2× SoCon Coach of the Year (1978, 1989)

Jack Wallace Cook (July 27, 1926 – November 24, 2021) was an American baseball coach and player, serving two stints as head coach for the Marshall Thundering Herd baseball team 1955 and 1967–1989. In 1994, Cook was inducted into the Marshall University Athletics Hall of Fame for his career as a coach and player.

During his time at Marshall, he led the Thundering Herd to their first NCAA tournament in 1973. Cook would led Marshall to the NCAA tournament again in 1978 whilst winning SoCon Coach of the Year. Prior to his second stint at Marshall, Cook was the head baseball coach at Huntington High School in West Virginia.

In 2023, it was announced that Marshall's new baseball stadium will be named Jack Cook Field in his honor.

== Head coaching record ==
Record table
Season	Team	Overall	Conference	Standing	Postseason
Marshall Thundering Herd (Mid-American Conference) (1955)
1955	Marshall	2–11	1–6	8th	
Marshall Thundering Herd (Mid-American Conference) (1967–1969)
1967	Marshall	11–12	4–5	4th	
1968	Marshall	18–7	5–4	3rd	
1969	Marshall	14–12–1	7–7	3rd	
Marshall Thundering Herd (Independent) (1970–1976)
1970	Marshall	14–12			
1971	Marshall	16–19			
1972	Marshall	14–11			
1973	Marshall	18–10			NCAA Regional
1974	Marshall	21–15			
1975	Marshall	24–10			
1976	Marshall	18–13			
Marshall Thundering Herd (Southern Conference) (1977–1989)
1977	Marshall	20–21	8–8	4th	
1978	Marshall	27–13	11–1	1st	NCAA Regional
1979	Marshall	23–15–1	10–6	4th	
1980	Marshall	17–11	10–3	2nd	
1981	Marshall	22–17	12–4	T–1st	
1982	Marshall	17–21	8–8	T–4th	
1983	Marshall	19–14	7–7	T–4th	
1984	Marshall	11–16	5–8	3rd (North)	
1985	Marshall	26–18–1	10–8	2nd (North)	
1986	Marshall	15–18	4–13	4th (North)	
1987	Marshall	16–17	5–7	3rd (North)	
1988	Marshall	23–17	7–9	3rd (North)	
1989	Marshall	16–14	8–5	2nd	
Marshall:		422–344–3	122–109		
Total:		422–344–3			
National champion Postseason invitational champion Conference regular season champion Conference regular season and conference tournament champion Division regular season champion Division regular season and conference tournament champion Conference tournament champion
