= Mike Gaski =

American baseball executive

President of USA Baseball
- In office January 7, 2001 – December 23, 2023
- Coaching career

Playing career
- 1970–1973: Detroit

Coaching career (HC unless noted)
- 1979: Cleveland State (Asst)
- 1980–1983: Ohio State (P/C)
- 1984–1987: Florida Southern (AHC)
- 1991–2012: UNC Greensboro

Head coaching record
- Overall: 655–540–1
- Tournaments: Big South: 4–1; Southern: 19–21; NCAA: 3–4

Accomplishments and honors

Championships
- 2× Big South Conference (1994, 1997); Big South Tournament (1997); Southern Conference (1998)

Awards
- 2× Big South Coach of the Year (1994, 1997); 2× Southern Coach of the Year (1998, 2011)

Michael Gaski is an American baseball executive, and former coach and player in college baseball. Since 2001, Gaski has served as president of the United States national baseball team.

Gaski played college baseball at the University of Detroit from 1970 to 1973. He was the head baseball coach at the University of North Carolina at Greensboro from 1991 to 2012; he was fired on May 25, 2012.

== Head coaching records ==
Record table
Season	Team	Overall	Conference	Standing	Postseason
UNC Greensboro Spartans (Independent) (1991–1993)
1991	UNC Greensboro	9–33			
1992	UNC Greensboro	20–26			
1993	UNC Greensboro	23–22			
UNC Greensboro Spartans (Big South Conference) (1994–1997)
1994	UNC Greensboro	39–18	20–6	1st	NCAA South Regional
1995	UNC Greensboro	35–19	17–7	2nd	
1996	UNC Greensboro	26–24	12–6	3rd	
1997	UNC Greensboro	45–17	18–3	1st	NCAA South I Regional
UNC Greensboro Spartans (Southern Conference) (1998–2012)
1998	UNC Greensboro	40–18	22–5	1st	Southern tournament
1999	UNC Greensboro	29–26	16–12	5th	Southern tournament
2000	UNC Greensboro	34–24	20–9	3rd	Southern tournament
2001	UNC Greensboro	31–28	17–12	5th	Southern tournament
2002	UNC Greensboro	33–22	17–11	5th	Southern tournament
2003	UNC Greensboro	39–21	17–13	T-4th	Southern tournament
2004	UNC Greensboro	33–21–1	16–14	5th	Southern tournament
2005	UNC Greensboro	31–22	17–13	5th	Southern tournament
2006	UNC Greensboro	26–33	13–14	7th	Southern tournament
2007	UNC Greensboro	30–30	14–13	T-4th	Southern tournament
2008	UNC Greensboro	33–27	15–12	5th	Southern tournament
2009	UNC Greensboro	20–29	7–21	10th	
2010	UNC Greensboro	20–33	7–23	10th	
2011	UNC Greensboro	34–20	22–8	2nd	Southern tournament
2012	UNC Greensboro	25–27	10–20	9th	
UNC Greensboro:		655–540–1	297–222		
Total:		655–540–1			
National champion Postseason invitational champion Conference regular season champion Conference regular season and conference tournament champion Division regular season champion Division regular season and conference tournament champion Conference tournament champion
