= 2011 Southern Conference baseball tournament =

- Teams: 8
- Format: Double-elimination tournament
- Finals site: Joseph P. Riley Jr.; Charleston, South Carolina
- Champions: Georgia Southern (5th title)
- Winning coach: Rodney Hennon (4th title)
- MVP: Chris Beck (Georgia Southern)
- Attendance: 11,860

2011 Southern Conference baseball standings
	Conf.				Overall
Team	W		L	PCT	W		L	PCT
Elon ‍†‍‍	23	–	7	.767	36	–	21	.632
UNC Greensboro ‍‍‍	22	–	8	.733	34	–	20	.630
College of Charleston ‍‍‍	18	–	12	.600	39	–	22	.639
Samford ‍‍‍	18	–	12	.600	37	–	23	.617
Georgia Southern ‍‍‡‍^{y}	18	–	12	.600	36	–	26	.581
Appalachian State ‍‍‍	15	–	15	.500	33	–	27	.550
Furman ‍‍‍	13	–	16	.448	24	–	33	.421
Western Carolina ‍‍‍	12	–	18	.400	23	–	31	.426
Wofford ‍‍‍	9	–	21	.300	22	–	33	.400
Davidson ‍‍‍	8	–	21	.276	18	–	30	.375
The Citadel ‍‍‍	8	–	22	.267	20	–	36	.357
† – Conference champion ‡ – SoCon Tournament champion y – Invited to the NCAA tournament As of June 30, 2011; Rankings from Coaches' Poll

The 2011 Southern Conference baseball tournament was held at Joseph P. Riley Jr. Park in Charleston, South Carolina, from May 25 through 29. Fourth seeded Georgia Southern won the tournament and earned the Southern Conference's automatic bid to the 2011 NCAA Division I baseball tournament. It was Georgia Southern's fifth SoCon tournament win and second in three years.

The tournament used a double-elimination format. Only the top eight teams participate, so Wofford, Davidson, and The Citadel were not in the field.

== Seeding ==
Team	W	L	Pct	GB	Seed
Elon	23	7	.767	–	1
UNC Greensboro	22	8	.733	1	2
Samford	18	12	.600	4	3
Georgia Southern	18	12	.600	4	4
College of Charleston	18	12	.600	4	5
Appalachian State	15	15	.500	7	6
Furman	13	16	.500	8.5	7
Western Carolina	12	18	.500	10	8
Wofford	9	21	.300	13	
Davidson	8	21	.276	13.5	
The Citadel	8	22	.267	14	

== Brackets ==
=== Bracket One ===
First round
7	Furman	12
2	UNC Greensboro	6
6	Appalachian State	3
3	Samford	5
Lower round 1
2	UNC Greensboro	4
6	Appalachian State	6

Second round
3	Samford	7
7	Furman	1
Lower final
6	Appalachian State	5
7	Furman	0

Semifinals
3	Samford
6	Appalachian State

=== Bracket Two ===
First round
8	Western Carolina	10
1	Elon	7
5	College of Charleston	2
4	Georgia Southern	4
Lower round 1
1	Elon	3
5	College of Charleston	4

Second round
4	Georgia Southern	12
8	Western Carolina	1
Lower final
5	College of Charleston	4
8	Western Carolina	2

Semifinals
4	Georgia Southern
5	College of Charleston

=== Final ===
Sunday, May 29, 2011
Team	R
#4 Georgia Southern	1
#3 Samford	0

== Game summaries ==
=== Round One ===
Wednesday, May 25 9:00 am
Team	1	2	3	4	5	6	7	8	9	R	H	E
#7 Furman	1	3	2	0	2	2	1	0	1	12	17	2
#2 UNC Greensboro	0	1	2	0	0	3	0	0	0	6	11	1
WP: Bobby Lyne LP: Warren Slack; Attendance: 542; Boxscore

Wednesday, May 25 1:11 pm
Team	1	2	3	4	5	6	7	8	9	R	H	E
#6 Appalachian State	3	0	0	0	0	0	0	0	0	3	10	1
#3 Samford	1	0	0	0	3	0	0	1	X	5	10	1
WP: Kyle Putkonen LP: Ryan Arrowood Sv: Andrew Jones; Attendance: 495; Boxscore

Wednesday, May 25 5:00 pm
Team	1	2	3	4	5	6	7	8	9	10	11	12	13	14	15	16	17	18	19	20	R	H	E
#8 Western Carolina	0	1	1	1	0	0	0	2	0	0	0	0	0	1	0	0	0	0	1	3	10	21	4
#1 Elon	1	1	1	0	0	2	0	0	0	0	0	0	0	1	0	0	0	0	1	0	7	10	3
WP: Taylor Sandefur LP: David Whitehead; Home runs: WCU: Heffley, Johns; EU: None; Attendance: 937; Notes: Longest baseball game in SoCon history. Boxscore

Thursday, May 26 12:30 am
Team	1	2	3	4	5	6	7	8	9	R	H	E
#5 College of Charleston	0	0	0	1	0	0	1	0	0	2	5	1
#4 Georgia Southern	0	1	0	0	0	0	0	3	X	4	7	2
WP: Chris Beck LP: Josh Renfro Sv: Matt Murray; Attendance: 840; Notes: Game began at 12:30 am due to 20 inning game prior. Latest game in tournament history Boxscore

=== Round Two ===
Thursday, May 26 9:02 am
Team	1	2	3	4	5	6	7	8	9	R	H	E
#2 UNC Greensboro	0	0	0	0	1	0	3	0	0	4	11	1
#6 Appalachian State	1	0	0	2	0	0	2	1	X	6	11	0
WP: Will Helms LP: Colby Hyatt Sv: Taylor Miller; Attendance: 457; Notes: UNC Greensboro eliminated Boxscore

Thursday, May 26 1:00 pm
Team	1	2	3	4	5	6	7	8	9	R	H	E
#1 Elon	0	0	1	0	2	0	0	0	0	3	8	1
#5 College of Charleston	1	0	0	1	0	0	1	1	X	4	8	1
WP: Kyle Owings LP: John Brebbia; Home runs: EU: None; CofC: Gantt; Attendance: 785; Notes: Elon eliminated Boxscore

Thursday, May 26 5:03 pm
Team	1	2	3	4	5	6	7	8	9	R	H	E
#3 Samford	1	2	3	0	1	0	0	0	0	7	11	2
#7 Furman	0	0	0	0	0	1	0	0	0	1	8	2
WP: Charles Basford LP: Daniel Stallsmith; Attendance: 852; Boxscore

Thursday, May 26 9:00 pm
Team	1	2	3	4	5	6	7	8	9	R	H	E
#4 Georgia Southern	1	0	2	2	0	0	3	0	4	12	14	0
#8 Western Carolina	0	0	0	0	0	0	1	0	0	1	4	3
WP: Andy Moye LP: Jordan Smith; Attendance: 551; Notes: Game began at 12:30 am due to 20 inning game prior. Boxscore

=== Round Three ===
Friday, May 27 3:00 pm
Team	1	2	3	4	5	6	7	8	9	R	H	E
#6 Appalachian State	0	0	0	3	0	2	0	0	0	5	15	1
#7 Furman	0	0	0	0	0	0	0	0	X	0	6	0
WP: Seth Grant LP: Tyler Wood; Attendance: 527; Notes: Furman eliminated Boxscore

Friday, May 27 1:00 pm
Team	1	2	3	4	5	6	7	8	9	R	H	E
#5 College of Charleston	0	0	0	1	1	0	2	0	0	4	6	0
#8 Western Carolina	1	0	0	0	0	0	1	0	0	2	9	0
WP: Christian Powell LP: Kyle Stewart Sv: Kyle Owings; Attendance: 1,409; Notes: Western Carolina eliminated Boxscore

=== Semifinals ===
Saturday, May 28 9:02 am
Team	1	2	3	4	5	6	7	8	9	R	H	E
#3 Samford	0	0	0	1	1	0	0	0	0	2	7	1
#6 Appalachian State	0	1	0	0	0	0	0	0	0	1	7	1
WP: Josh Martin LP: Ryne Frankoff Sv: Andrew Jones; Attendance: 611; Notes: Appalachian State eliminated Boxscore

Saturday, May 28 1:02 pm
Team	1	2	3	4	5	6	7	8	9	R	H	E
#4 Georgia Southern	0	0	0	0	0	0	0	1	0	1	5	1
#5 College of Charleston	0	0	0	0	4	4	0	1	X	8	13	0
WP: Jake Zokan LP: Matt Murray; Home runs: GSU: None; CofC: Kral; Attendance: 1,488; Boxscore

Saturday, May 28 4:59 pm
Team	1	2	3	4	5	6	7	8	9	R	H	E
#5 College of Charleston	0	2	0	0	0	0	0	4	0	6	8	3
#4 Georgia Southern	0	0	2	3	0	0	2	0	X	7	11	2
WP: Josh Adams LP: Casey Lucchese Sv: Jarret Leverett; Attendance: 1,275; Notes: College of Charleston eliminated Boxscore

=== Championship final ===
Sunday, May 29 2:00 pm
Team	1	2	3	4	5	6	7	8	9	R	H	E
#4 Georgia Southern	0	0	1	0	0	0	0	0	0	1	4	2
#3 Samford	0	0	0	0	0	0	0	0	0	0	3	3
WP: Chris Beck LP: Lex Rutledge; Attendance: 1,091; Boxscore

== All-Tournament Team ==
Position	Player	School
SP	Chris Beck	Georgia Southern
SP	Seth Grant	Appalachian State
RP	Andrew Jones	Samford
C	Tom Richardson	Georgia Southern
1B	Marty Gantt	College of Charleston
2B	Michael Johnson	Samford
SS	Eric Phillips	Georgia Southern
3B	Alex Abrams	Furman
OF	Tyler Zupcic	Appalachian State
OF	Cole Rakar	College of Charleston
OF	Phillip Ervin	Samford
DH	Michael Burruss	Georgia Southern

Walt Nadzak Award, Tournament Most Outstanding Player
Chris Beck
Georgia Southern
