= Jack Cook Field =

Baseball stadium in Huntington, West Virginia

- “The Jack”
- Interactive map of Jack Cook Field
- Location: 1 Jack Cook Way; Huntington, West Virginia
- Coordinates: 38.42811811598599°N 82.42018020172377°W
- Owner: Marshall University
- Operator: Marshall University
- Capacity: 3,500
- Surface: AstroTurf
- Record attendance: 3,124 vs Manhattan Jaspers (March 1, 2024)
- Field size: Left Field: 300ft; Left Center: 375ft; Center: 400ft; Right Center: 365ft; Right Field: 300ft

Construction
- Groundbreaking: 2022
- Opened: March 1, 2024
- Cost: $23 million

Tenants
- Marshall Thundering Herd (NCAA) (2024–present); Tri-State Coal Cats (Appy League) (2024–2025); WVSSAC State Baseball Championships (2026–present)

Jack Cook Field is a baseball stadium in Huntington, West Virginia. It is located on the campus of Marshall University and it is the current home field for the Marshall Thundering Herd baseball team. The field is named after former longtime Marshall head baseball coach, Jack Cook.

== History ==
In October 2022, Marshall officially broke ground on a new baseball stadium located on 3rd Avenue and 22nd Street next to Dot Hicks Field and across the street from Joan C. Edwards Stadium. West Virginia Governor Jim Justice donated $13.8 million towards the project with the City of Huntington and Marshall University also contributing nearly $10 million to help fund the stadium with an estimated $23 million cost. University officials announced on June 21, 2023, that the facility would be named Jack Cook Field in honor of former Marshall baseball coach Jack Cook. It was also announced that the clubhouse would be named in honor of former Marshall baseball player Alex Lawrence.

The stadium hosted its first game on March 1, 2024 when Marshall defeated Manhattan, 3–0, in front of a crowd of 3,124.

== Milestones and facts ==
Achievement	Record
Largest Attendance	3,124 - March 1, 2024, vs. Manhattan
Overall Record in Facility	32-19. (.627)*
Sun Belt Record in Facility	14-13 (.519)*
Record vs. Ranked; Opponents	2-2 (.500)*
Record vs. State Opponents	1-1 (.500)*
1st Game	March 1, 2024 vs. Manhattan
1st Win	3-0 March 1, 2024, vs. Manhattan
1st Sun Belt Win	6-2 March 23, 2024, vs. Arkansas State
1st Win over Ranked Team	4-3 April 4, 2025, vs. #13 Southern Miss
*As of the May 13, 2025

== Tenants ==
In addition to hosting Marshall baseball, the stadium hosted the Tri-State Coal Cats of the Appalachian League beginning in 2024. The partnership with the Coal Cats ended after the conclusion of the 2025 season.

It will host the West Virginia Secondary School Activities Commission state baseball tournament, with an expanded field of 32 teams, beginning in 2026.

== See also ==
- List of NCAA Division I baseball venues
