= 2024 Coastal Athletic Association baseball tournament =

American college baseball tournament

- Teams: 6
- Format: Modified Double-elimination tournament
- Finals site: Brooks Field; Wilmington, North Carolina
- Champions: UNC Wilmington (8th title)
- Winning coach: Randy Hood (2nd title)
- MVP: Trevor Marsh (UNC Wilmington)
- Television: FloSports

2024 Coastal Athletic Association baseball standings
	Conf.				Overall
Team	W		L	PCT	W		L	PCT
Charleston ‍†‍‍	21	–	5	.808	41	–	14	.745
UNC Wilmington ‍‍‡‍^{y}	20	–	7	.741	39	–	19	.672
Northeastern ‍‍‍	18	–	9	.667	38	–	17	.691
Delaware ‍‍‍	16	–	11	.593	31	–	26	.544
William & Mary ‍‍‍	13	–	14	.481	32	–	26	.552
Hofstra ‍‍‍	13	–	14	.481	24	–	33	.421
Campbell ‍‍‍	12	–	15	.444	31	–	22	.585
Stony Brook ‍‍‍	12	–	15	.444	24	–	28	.462
Monmouth ‍‍‍	11	–	16	.407	18	–	30	.375
Elon ‍‍‍	10	–	17	.370	21	–	32	.396
North Carolina A&T ‍‍‍	9	–	17	.346	25	–	28	.472
Towson ‍‍‍	5	–	20	.200	15	–	39	.278
† – Conference champion ‡ – Tournament champion y – Invited to the NCAA Tournament; As of May 26, 2024; Rankings from D1Baseball

The 2024 Coastal Athletic Association baseball tournament was held at Brooks Field in Wilmington, North Carolina, from May 22 through 26. The UNC Wilmington Seahawks won back-to-back titles and earned the conference's automatic bid to the 2024 NCAA Division I baseball tournament. This set a league-record eighth CAA baseball title for the Seahawks, their sixth since 2012.

== Seeding and format ==
Continuing the format adopted in 2012, the top six finishers from the regular season will compete in the modified double-elimination tournament.

== Bracket ==
Upper round 1	Upper round 2	Upper final	Final
6	Hofstra	7
5	William & Mary	4	1	College of Charleston	8
4	Delaware	7	2	UNC Wilmington	8
1	College of Charleston	5
4	Delaware	6
6	Hofstra	12	2	UNC Wilmington	10
3	Northeastern	9
2	UNC Wilmington	6	–
1	College of Charleston	4	–
Lower round 1	Lower round 2	Lower round 3	Lower final
4	Delaware	1
5	William & Mary	8	1	College of Charleston	11
6	Hofstra	6	4	Delaware	18
5	William & Mary	9	5	William & Mary	16
3	Northeastern	6

== Schedule ==
Game	Time*	Matchup^{#}	Score	Notes	Reference
Wednesday, May 22
1	12:00pm	No. 4 Delaware vs No. 5 William & Mary	7−4		
2	4:00pm	No. 3 Northeastern vs No. 6 Hofstra	9−12		
Thursday, May 23
3	11:00am	No. 5 William & Mary vs No. 3 Northeastern	9−6	Northeastern eliminated	
4	3:00pm	No. 1 College of Charleston vs No. 6 Hofstra	7−8		
5	7:00pm	No. 2 UNC Wilmington vs No. 4 Delaware	10−6		
Friday, May 24
6	11:00am	No. 5 William & Mary vs No. 6 Hofstra	16−6	Hofstra eliminated	
7	8:00pm	No. 4 Delaware vs No. 5 William & Mary	18−8	William & Mary eliminated	
Saturday, May 25
8	11:00am	No. 2 UNC Wilmington vs No. 1 College of Charleston	8−5		
9	3:00pm	No. 4 Delaware vs No. 1 College of Charleston	1−11	Game was suspended in the bottom of the 7th inning due to inclement weather and was resumed on Sunday at 11am. Delaware eliminated	
Sunday, May 26
10	12:30pm	No. 2 UNC Wilmington vs No. 1 College of Charleston	6−4	UNC Wilmington wins championship	
11		Rematch (not necessary)			
*Game times in EDT. # – Rankings denote tournament seed.

== All–Tournament Team ==
Player	Team
Trevor Marsh (MVP)	UNC Wilmington
Trace Baker	UNC Wilmington
Jac Croom	UNC Wilmington
Aiden Evans	UNC Wilmington
Tanner Thach	UNC Wilmington
Trotter Harlan	College of Charleston
Aidan Hunter	College of Charleston
Cole Mathis	College of Charleston
Avery Neaves	College of Charleston
Steve Harrington	Hofstra
Aidan Kane	Delaware
