= 2023 Colonial Athletic Association baseball tournament =

American college baseball tournament

- Teams: 6
- Format: Modified Double-elimination tournament
- Finals site: The Ballpark at Patriots Point; Mount Pleasant, South Carolina
- Champions: UNC Wilmington (7th title)
- Winning coach: Randy Hood (1st title)
- MVP: Dillon Lifrieri (UNC Wilmington)

2023 Colonial Athletic Association baseball standings
	Conf.				Overall
Team	W		L	PCT	W		L	PCT
UNC Wilmington ‍†‍‡‍^{y}	20	–	8	.714	31	–	21	.596
Elon ‍‍‍	19	–	9	.679	32	–	20	.615
Northeastern ‍‍‍^{y}	20	–	10	.667	41	–	12	.774
Charleston ‍‍‍	18	–	12	.600	34	–	20	.630
Delaware ‍‍‍	17	–	13	.567	29	–	27	.518
William & Mary ‍‍‍	15	–	15	.500	32	–	23	.582
Stony Brook ‍‍‍	14	–	16	.467	23	–	29	.442
Hofstra ‍‍‍	13	–	15	.464	26	–	26	.500
North Carolina A&T ‍‍‍	11	–	17	.393	19	–	28	.404
Towson ‍‍‍	7	–	23	.233	19	–	37	.339
Monmouth ‍‍‍	6	–	22	.214	16	–	30	.348
† – Conference champion ‡ – Tournament champion y – Invited to the NCAA Tournament; As of May 20, 2023; Rankings from D1Baseball

The 2023 Colonial Athletic Association baseball tournament was held at The Ballpark at Patriots Point in Mount Pleasant, South Carolina, from May 24 through 27. UNC Wilmington won their seventh Colonial Athletic Association baseball championship and third championship in the past five tournaments. With the win, they also earned the conference's automatic bid to the 2023 NCAA Division I baseball tournament.

== Seeding and format ==
Continuing the format adopted in 2012, the top six finishers from the regular season will compete in the modified double-elimination tournament.

== Bracket ==
Upper round 1	Upper round 2	Upper final	Final
5	Delaware	0
5	Delaware	7	1	UNC Wilmington	3
4	College of Charleston	4	3	Northeastern	5
1	UNC Wilmington	6^{10}
3	Northeastern	2
6	William & Mary	0	2	Elon	1
3	Northeastern	6
3	Northeastern	4	–
1	UNC Wilmington	5	–
Lower round 1	Lower round 2	Lower round 3	Lower final
2	Elon	8
4	College of Charleston	5	3	Northeastern	14
5	Delaware	2	2	Elon	10
6	William & Mary	1	4	College of Charleston	5
4	College of Charleston	2

== Schedule ==
Game	Time*	Matchup^{#}	Score	Notes	Reference
Wednesday, May 24
1	12:00pm	No. 4 College of Charleston vs No. 5 Delaware	4–7		
2	4:00pm	No. 3 Northeastern vs No. 6 William & Mary	6–0		
Thursday, May 25
3	11:00am	No. 6 William & Mary vs No. 4 College of Charleston	1–2	William & Mary eliminated	
4	3:00pm	No. 1 UNC Wilmington vs No. 4 Delaware	3–0		
5	7:00pm	No. 2 Elon vs No. 3 Northeastern	1–2		
Friday, May 26
6	9:00am	No. 4 College of Charleston vs No. 5 Delaware	5–2	Delaware eliminated	
7	12:30pm	No. 2 Elon vs. No. 4 College of Charleston	10–5	College of Charleston eliminated	
8	4:20pm	No. 3 Northeastern vs No. 1 UNC Wilmington	5-6 (10)		
Saturday, May 27 no games due to weather
Sunday, May 28
9	1:00pm	No. 2 Elon vs No. 3 Northeastern	8–14	Elon eliminated	
10	5:00pm	No. 3 Northeastern vs No. 1 UNC Wilmington	4–5	UNC Wilmington wins championship	
11		Rematch (not necessary)	–		
*Game times in EDT. # – Rankings denote tournament seed.
