= Tri-State Coal Cats =

Former collegiate summer baseball team based in Huntington, West Virginia

Information
- League: Appalachian League (East Division)
- Location: Huntington, West Virginia
- Ballpark: Jack Cook Field
- Founded: 2024
- Folded: 2025
- Colors: Marshall green, coal black, white, cool gray
- Ownership: Marshall University; Kindred Communications
- Management: CC Baseball Club
- Manager: Tommy Gregg
- Website: Official website

The Tri-State Coal Cats were a summer collegiate baseball team of the Appalachian League. They were located in Huntington, West Virginia, and played their home games at Jack Cook Field on the campus of Marshall University.

== History ==
On October 11, 2023, the Appalachian League announced that the Princeton WhistlePigs would be ceasing operations, effective immediately, leaving an open spot in the 10 team league. On November 16, the league announced that Marshall University would host an Appalachian League team beginning with the 2024 season, marking the first time Huntington hosted Appalachian League baseball since 1994, when the Huntington Cubs played at St. Cloud Commons. On February 1 and 8 of 2024, it was announced that former MLB player Tommy Gregg and former Pittsburgh Pirates pitcher Salomón Torres were hired as the manager and pitching coach respectively. On February 15, the team name was announced as the Tri-State Coal Cats, honoring the tri-state area of Huntington, West Virginia; Southern Ohio; and Northeast Kentucky, with their color scheme identical to the Marshall Thundering Herd.

Huntington, West Virginia, has a long history with professional baseball, dating back to the early 20th century. The city fielded teams in several minor leagues, including the Virginia Valley League (1910), Mountain States League (1911–1912, 1937–1942), Ohio State League (1913–1916), and the Middle Atlantic League (1931–1936).

In the 1990s, Huntington became home to an Appalachian League franchise for six seasons. From 1990 to 1994, the Huntington Cubs served as the Chicago Cubs’ Rookie-level affiliate, playing their home games at St. Cloud Commons. In 1995, following the Cubs’ departure, Huntington fielded a co-op team known as the River City Rumblers, which was composed of players from the remaining nine MLB organizations.

One notable figure to pass through Huntington was future NFL defensive back Jason Sehorn. Signed by the Chicago Cubs out of American Legion baseball at age 19, Sehorn played for the inaugural Huntington Cubs team in 1990. While he showcased impressive speed—going 9-for-10 in stolen base attempts—he struggled offensively, finishing with a .184 batting average, one home run, 10 RBIs, and 52 strikeouts in 141 plate appearances. After his brief baseball career, Sehorn transitioned to football, playing at junior college and then USC. He went on to enjoy a 10-year NFL career with the New York Giants (1994–2002) and St. Louis Rams (2003), and played in Super Bowl XXXV as a cornerback for the Giants.

The Coal Cats were not listed on the Appalachian League schedule for 2026.

== Season-by-season results ==
Tri-State Coal Cats (Appalachian League)
Year	Regular Season				Postseason			
Year	Manager	Record	Win %	Finish	Record	Win %	Result	MLB
2024	Tommy Gregg	22-26	.458	4th (East)	—	–	—	Independent
2025	Tommy Gregg	16-27	.372	5th (East)	—	—	—	Independent
Subtotals	—	0–0	–	—	0–0	–	0 Appalachian League Championships	
Note: *

Legend
Playoff Appearance
Won League Championship

== Logos and uniform ==
In 2025, the Tri-State Coal Cats adopted an alternate identity for every Saturday home game, playing as the Huntington Slaw Dogs. Under this alias, they debut a neon green version of their uniform and a new logo featuring a West Virginia-style hot dog.

== Major League alumni ==
The following players appeared for the Huntington Cubs or River City Rumblers and later played in Major League Baseball:

Notable Major League alumni
Player	Year(s) in Huntington	Position
Ryan Hawblitzel	1990	RHP
Dave Stevens	1990	RHP
Terry Adams	1991	RHP
Pedro Valdés	1991	OF
Amaury Telemaco	1992	RHP
Geremi González	1993	RHP
Jason Maxwell	1993	INF
Richie Barker	1994	RHP
Javier Martinez	1994	RHP
Steve Rain	1994	RHP
Jason Ryan	1994	RHP
Julio Zuleta	1994	1B/OF
Julio Manon	1995	RHP

Legend
Former MLB All-Star
World Series Champion
