= Covenant School (West Virginia) =

Private classical Christian school in Huntington, West Virginia, U.S.

Location
- 2400 Johnstown Road; Huntington, West Virginia 25701; United States

Information
- Type: Private classical Christian
- Motto: Seek truth. Love beauty. Live well.
- Established: 1995
- Head of School: Craig Hefner
- Grades: K–12
- Enrollment: ~365
- Colors: Cardinal Red and Navy Blue
- Mascot: Eagles
- Accreditation: Association of Classical and Christian Schools (ACCS); Society for Classical Learning (SCL)

Covenant School is a private classical Christian K–12 school in Huntington, West Virginia, United States. Founded in 1995, the school provides a liberal arts curriculum rooted in the classical Christian tradition and is accredited by both the Association of Classical and Christian Schools and the Society for Classical Learning . It serves students from kindergarten through twelfth grade and is among the larger private Christian schools in the region.

== History ==
Covenant School opened in 1995 with an inaugural class of 35 students. Founded during early growth of the classical Christian education movement, the school expanded over the subsequent decades by adding grade levels, faculty, and preparatory academic programming.

In 2022, Covenant earned full accreditation from the Association of Classical and Christian Schools, a milestone reported by The Herald-Dispatch.

In 2026, Covenant also earned accreditation from the Society for Classical Learning.

=== Campus expansion (2023–present) ===
In November 2023, Covenant announced plans to build a new permanent campus on 135 acres in Cabell County. The land—formerly owned by Marshall University assistant football coach William “Red” Dawson—was acquired to address enrollment growth and facility limitations. The expansion was covered by WSAZ-TV.

The Herald-Dispatch later reported that the school had “taken a step toward construction” as development planning progressed.

In 2025, Covenant acquired an additional 9.5-acre parcel, as recorded in the Cabell County Courthouse public land-records summary published by Real WV. This property was purchased from DirecTV, which owned facility for a call center. Prior to DirecTV, the building was a Hills (store).

Architectural master-planning for the new campus has been developed by Glavé & Holmes Architecture, an independent architecture firm.

== Mission and educational philosophy ==
Covenant School follows the classical Christian model structured around the historic trivium of grammar, logic, and rhetoric. Its stated mission is to cultivate wisdom, virtue, and a love of learning in students, emphasizing integration of faith and academics. The curriculum includes the great books, rhetoric, mathematics, natural sciences, Bible instruction, and the fine and performing arts.

== Academics ==
The school offers a full K–12 humanities-based curriculum with required courses in Latin, formal logic, Rhetoric, and history of Western civilization. Class sizes are small, with an estimated student–teacher ratio of approximately 12:1.

== Student life ==
Covenant students participate in school-wide chapel services, fine arts programs, athletics, and extracurricular clubs.

== See also ==
- Classical Christian education
- Association of Classical and Christian Schools
- Education in West Virginia
