= Marshall Thundering Herd baseball =

Marshall Thundering Herd
- 2026 Marshall Thundering Herd baseball team
- Founded: 1896
- Overall record: 1514-1778-15 (.460)
- University: Marshall University
- Athletic director: Christian Spears
- Head coach: Greg Beals (4th season)
- Conference: Sun Belt
- Location: Huntington, West Virginia
- Home stadium: Jack Cook Field (capacity: 3,500)
- Nickname: Thundering Herd
- Colors: Kelly green and white

NCAA tournament appearances
- 1973, 1978

Conference regular season champions
- 1928, 1929, 1930, 1931, 1933, 1934, 1935, 1978, 1981

The Marshall Thundering Herd baseball team represents the Marshall University in NCAA Division I college baseball and competes in the Sun Belt Conference. The current head coach of the Herd is Greg Beals. Marshall plays its home games at Jack Cook Field, a 3,500 seat on-campus facility which opened for the 2024 season.

== History ==
Marshall baseball was a winning program right from the start. The Herd won the West Virginia Intercollegiate Athletic Conference (which Marshall helped to found in 1924 as what would be known as the WVIAC) in 1928-29-30-3 under former Ohio State University and St. Louis Cardinals pitcher Johnny "Stud" Stuart, then won the Buckeye Conference 1933-34-35 under Marshall and West Virginia University Halls of Fame member Roy "Legs" Hawley.

It would be until 1978 before the Herd won another league title, winning the Southern Conference in its second year in the league and again in 1981. Marshall advanced to the NCAA Tournament in 1973 as an independent and 1978 as the SoCon champ, all under legendary baseball head coach Jack Cook (the namesake of Marshall's new ballpark).

Marshall finished as runner-up in the 2008 Conference USA (C-USA) baseball tournament, falling in the finals to Houston, 3–2, but winning a MU record 30 games without a home field to use in Huntington for the entire season. For the first time since 1994, Marshall had players drafted in the Major League Baseball draft with a school-record three being selected, plus one recruit in 2008. Steve Blevins, who tied the single-season wins mark with a 9–3 mark, signed with the Minnesota Twins on June 11, while Nate Lape was drafted by the Colorado Rockies and Tommy Johnson by the Seattle Mariners. Lape and second baseman Adam Yeager played in the Cape Cod League, the premier wooden bat summer college baseball league, for the Brewster Whitecaps.

In 2015, outfielder Corey Bird was an All-Cape Cod League selection, then hit .300 for the 2016 Herd and led C-USA in stolen bases. In 2016, Marshall finished second in C-USA by 1/2 game behind Florida Atlantic, and the Herd advanced to the semi-finals of the C-USA Tournament, losing to eventual champ Southern Miss in the Golden Eagles' home stadium, 3–2, in the semis and finishing 2–2 in the tourney. The Herd won a Marshall record 34 games (and lost only 21), posted the first winning season since 1994 and made the C-USA Tournament for the first time since 2010. Marshall was 13–2 in the final five series of the year in the league games and swept three in a row on the way to winning eight C-USA series, also an all-time high. Senior Chase Boster became Marshall's biggest winning when he passed both Albie DeYoung and Grant Harper with his 20th win of his career, finishing 8–3 on the season.

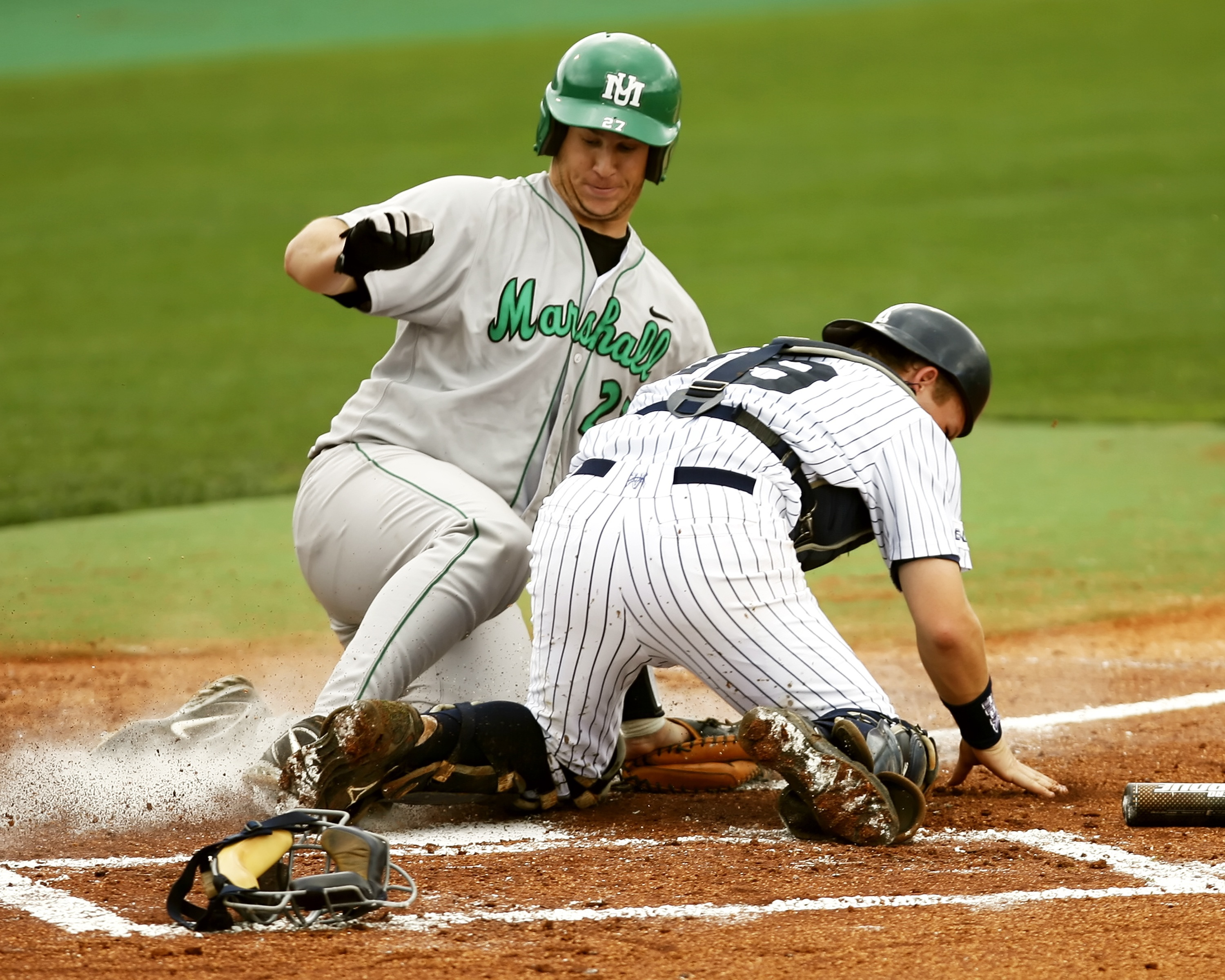
A Thundering Herd player is safe at home during a 2007 game against the Rice Owls.

Unlike most Division I baseball programs, Marshall did not have a full-time home stadium until the 2024 season. Due to Conference USA standards, it played non-conference games at Kennedy Center Field, a community baseball field just outside Huntington. Due to its limited amenities for both fans and players, Marshall has played conference games at GoMart Ballpark in Charleston, more than 50 miles from campus. Select games were also played at Linda K. Epling Stadium in Beckley, 110 miles from campus. Upgrades to the Kennedy Center Field allowed Marshall to play all its games there beginning in 2019, with the exception of games versus rivals WVU and Virginia Tech. These games drew a larger crowd than the Kennedy Center could accommodate and as such, continued to be played in Charleston through the 2023 season.

In 2018, the school purchased land near its existing campus for a new ballpark. Construction began in 2019, with completion originally planned for the 2021 season. The opening was delayed to the 2022 season due to COVID-19, and still later delayed until 2024. The new ballpark is named for longtime Herd head coach Jack Cook.

=== Conference Championships ===
Marshall has won 9 conference championships, 8 outright and one shared.

Season	Conference	Coach	Conference Record	Overall Record
1928	WVIAC	Johnny Stuart	11–0	15–2
1929	WVIAC	Johnny Stuart	7–1	14–1
1930	WVIAC	Johnny Stuart	4–0	10–6
1931	WVIAC	Johnny Stuart	7–0–1	11–1–1
1933	Buckeye Conference	Roy Hawley	6–2	9–2
1934	Buckeye Conference	Roy Hawley	10–1	13–2
1935	Buckeye Conference	Roy Hawley	8–0	8–1
1978	Southern Conference	Jack Cook	11–1	27–13
1981†	Southern Conference	Jack Cook	12–4	22–17

† Co-champions

=== All-time record vs. rivals ===
Opponent	Won	Lost	Tie	Percentage	Streak	First Meeting	Last Meeting
Ohio	56	123	0	.313	Won 4	1908	2025
West Virginia	26	58	0	.313	Lost 2	1910	2025
Totals	82	181	0	.312			

* Records as of April 15, 2025

=== Individual Achievements ===
==== All-Americans ====
- Mark Doboney - 1973 First-Team All-American (Pitcher, led nation with 0.55 ERA)

==== National Award Recognition ====
- Victor Gomez - 2008 Freshman All-American, 2011 NCBWA Third-Team Preseason All-American
- Reynaldo Pastrana - 2018 NCBWA Third-Team Preseason All-American
- Aaron Blair - 2012 Summer Collegiate All-American
- Adam Yeager - 2008 College Baseball Foundational National All-Star Lineup (SS)
- Jeff Waggoner - 2008 All-Pavlovich Team Coach of the Year
- Jeff Cook - 1978 National Coach of the Year Finalist

==== Conference Awards ====
- Tommy Lane - 2016 C-USA Newcomer of the Year (INF)
- Tom Kuempel - 1998 MAC Player of the Year (1B)
- Tony Peterson - 1987 Southern Conference Male Athlete of the Year (RP), 1988 Southern Conference Male Athlete of the Year (RP)
- Jeff Montgomery - 1981 Southern Conference Freshman of the Year (SP)
- Jeff Cook - 1978 Southern Conference Coach of the Year, 1989 Southern Conference Coach of the Year
- Jeff Waggoner - 2008 Conference USA Coach of the Year

== Jack Cook Field ==
Opened on March 1, 2024, Jack Cook Field is named in honor of legendary coach Jack Cook, who led the Marshall Thundering Herd baseball program from 1967 to 1989. Over his storied career, Cook amassed 422 wins and guided the team to two NCAA Tournament appearances in 1973 and 1978. His lasting impact on the program earned him induction into the Marshall Athletics Hall of Fame in 1994. Fittingly, his jersey number 1 remains the only number ever retired in Marshall baseball history.

== NCAA Division I Tournament history ==
Marshall has appeared in the NCAA Division I baseball tournament two times. Their combined record is 2–4.

Year	Record	Pct	Notes
1973	0–2	.000	Eliminated by Miami (OH) in the District 4 Regional
1978	2–2	.500	Eliminated by Miami (FL) in the Atlantic Regional final
Total	2–4	.333	

== Former players ==
Marshall has sent 16 players to the major leagues and has had 34 Major League Baseball draft selections since the draft began in 1965.

=== Herd in Major League Baseball ===
- Jimmy Adair – Chicago Cubs
- Aaron Blair – Atlanta Braves
- Wilbur Fisher – Pittsburgh Pirates
- Johnson Fry – Cleveland Indians
- Joe Goddard – San Diego Padres
- J. D. Hammer – Philadelphia Phillies
- Jack Harper – Philadelphia Athletics
- Jeff Montgomery – Cincinnati Reds, Kansas City Royals
- Rick Reed – Pittsburgh Pirates, Kansas City Royals, Texas Rangers, Cincinnati Reds, New York Mets, Minnesota Twins
- Kevin Shackelford – Cincinnati Reds
- Arch Reilly – Pittsburgh Pirates
- Brandyn Sittinger – Arizona Diamondbacks
- Dan Straily – Oakland Athletics, Chicago Cubs, Houston Astros, Cincinnati Reds, Miami Marlins, Baltimore Orioles
- Johnny Watson – Detroit Tigers
- Bill Wilson – Philadelphia Phillies

Thundering Herd in the Major League Baseball Draft
Year	Player	Round	Team
1968	Bobby Lemly	42	Reds
1969	Steven Miller	11	Reds
1970	Carl Hewlett	44	Pirates
1971	Joe Goddard	8	Padres
1976	Louis Packer	21	Phillies
1983	Jeff Montgomery	9	Reds
1985	John McKinney	11	Phillies
1986	Rick Reed	26	Pirates
1988	John Chaffin	18	White Sox
1994	Matt Spade	28	Pirates
1994	Rick Paugh	45	Pirates
2008	Nate Lape	20	Rockies
2008	Steven Blevins	21	Twins
2008	Tommy Johnson	27	Mariners
2009	Dan Straily	24	Athletics
2010	Kevin Shackelford	21	Brewers
2010	Ryan Kiel	27	Mariners
2011	Greg Williams	12	Rangers
2011	Rhett Stafford	22	Athletics
2011	Mike Mason	23	Rangers
2011	Isaac Ballou	36	Pirates
2011	Arik Sikula	36	Blue Jays
2011	Joe Church	40	Angels
2011	Kenny Socorro	44	Cubs
2011	Shane Farrell	46	Blue Jays
2012	Joe Church	17	Padres
2012	Mike Mason	24	Rockies
2013	Aaron Blair	1	Diamondbacks
2013	Isaac Ballou	15	Nationals
2016	Corey Bird	7	Marlins
2016	Burris Warner	22	Tigers
2016	J. D. Hammer	24	Rockies
2016	Parker Danciu	39	Braves
2017	Tyler Ratliff	17	Rangers
2019	Elvis Paralta	26	Athletics
2019	Josh Shapiro	34	Brewers
2023	Patrick Copen	7	Dodgers
2024	Owen Ayers	19	Cubs

=== Herd in other fields ===
- Billy Crystal – Academy-Award winning actor and comedian Billy Crystal attended Marshall on a baseball scholarship. Crystal never played baseball at Marshall because the program was suspended during his first year, 1965. He did not return to Marshall as a sophomore.

== See also ==
- List of NCAA Division I baseball programs
