= 2005 Southern Conference baseball tournament =

- Teams: 8
- Format: Double-elimination tournament
- Finals site: Joseph P. Riley Jr. Park; Charleston, South Carolina
- Champions: Furman (2nd title)
- MVP: Nick Hollstegge (Furman)
- Attendance: 26,707

2005 Southern Conference baseball standings
	Conf.				Overall
Team	W		L	PCT	W		L	PCT
#26 College of Charleston †^{y} ‍‍‍	27	–	3	.900	48	–	15	.762
Georgia Southern ‍‍‍	18	–	11	.621	38	–	22	.633
Western Carolina ‍‍‍	18	–	12	.600	33	–	23	.589
Elon ‍‍‍	18	–	12	.600	32	–	25	.561
UNC Greensboro ‍‍‍	17	–	13	.567	31	–	22	.585
The Citadel ‍‍‍	14	–	16	.467	25	–	34	.424
East Tennessee State ‍‍‍	13	–	16	.448	31	–	22	.585
Furman ‍‍‡‍^{y}	13	–	16	.448	30	–	29	.508
Davidson ‍‍‍	13	–	17	.433	26	–	24	.520
Wofford ‍‍‍	7	–	23	.233	17	–	37	.315
Appalachian State ‍‍‍	5	–	24	.172	10	–	42	.192
† – Conference champion ‡ – SoCon Tournament champion y – Invited to the NCAA tournament As of June 30, 2005; Rankings from Collegiate Baseball

The 2005 Southern Conference baseball tournament was held at Joseph P. Riley Jr. Park in Charleston, South Carolina, from May 23 through 27. Eighth seeded Furman won the tournament and earned the Southern Conference's automatic bid to the 2005 NCAA Division I baseball tournament. It was the Paladins' second SoCon tournament win.

The top eight baseball programs in the conference participated in the double-elimination tournament. Davidson, Wofford, and Appalachian State were not in the field. While College of Charleston dominated the regular season, Furman swept Davidson in the final regular season series to make the tournament, then swept the tournament for the unlikely championship.

== Seeding ==
Team	W	L	Pct	GB	Seed
College of Charleston	27	3	.900	–	1
Georgia Southern	18	11	.621	8.5	2
Western Carolina	18	12	.600	9	3
Elon	18	12	.600	9	4
UNC Greensboro	17	13	.567	10	5
The Citadel	14	16	.467	13	6
East Tennessee State	13	16	.448	13.5	7
Furman	13	16	.448	13.5	8
Davidson	13	17	.433	14	
Wofford	7	23	.233	20	
Appalachian State	5	24	.172	23.5	

== Bracket ==
Seeding and pairings:

Upper round 1	Upper round 2	Upper final	Final
5	UNC Greensboro	6
4	Elon	12
4	Elon	3
8	Furman	6
8	Furman	9
1	College of Charleston	7
8	Furman	4
2	Georgia Southern	1
7	East Tennessee State	3
2	Georgia Southern	2
2	Georgia Southern	7
3	Western Carolina	2
6	The Citadel	1
3	Western Carolina	6	2	Georgia Southern	4
8	Furman	5
Lower round 1	Lower round 2	Lower round 3	Lower final
3	Western Carolina	4
1	College of Charleston	8	1	College of Charleston	1	2	Georgia Southern	11
5	UNC Greensboro	2	1	College of Charleston	9	1	College of Charleston	5
6	The Citadel	7
6	The Citadel	8
7	East Tennessee State	6	4	Elon	7
6	The Citadel	10

== All-Tournament Team ==
Position	Player	School
P	Nick Hollstegge	Furman
C	Flint Wipke	Georgia Southern
1B	Case Cassedy	Furman
2B	Chris Campbell	College of Charleston
SS	Matt Matulia	The Citadel
3B	Matthew Betsill	Furman
OF	Brett Gardner	College of Charleston
OF	James Payne	Georgia Southern
OF	Brent Stephens	Georgia Southern
DH	Sam McLain	Furman

Walt Nadzak Award, Tournament Most Outstanding Player
Nick Hollstegge
Furman
