= Joe Goddard (baseball) =

American baseball player (born 1950)

WVU Tech Gold Bears
- Catcher / Coach
- Born: July 23, 1950 (age 76); Beckley, West Virginia, U.S.
- Batted: Right Threw: Right

MLB debut
- July 31, 1972, for the San Diego Padres

Last MLB appearance
- October 4, 1972, for the San Diego Padres

MLB statistics
- Games played: 12
- At bats: 35
- Hits: 7
- Stats at Baseball Reference

Teams
- San Diego Padres (1972)

Joseph Harold Goddard (born July 23, 1950) is an American former Major League Baseball catcher who played with the San Diego Padres in 1972. He played college baseball for the Marshall Thundering Herd.

After his playing career, Goddard began coaching at Independence High School in West Virginia when the school opened in 1976. In 2022, he was inducted into the West Virginia Sports Coaches Hall of Fame. As of 2026, Goddard is serving as bench coach for the WVU Tech Golden Bears baseball team.
