= Keith LeClair =

American athlete and baseball coach

Coaching career (HC unless noted)
- 1992–1997: Western Carolina
- 1998–2002: East Carolina

Head coaching record
- Overall: 440–231–3

Accomplishments and honors

Championships
- 1992 Southern Conference regular season and tournament championships three Colonial Athletic Association championships one Conference USA title

Awards
- 1988 MVP of the Southern Conference Tournament; 1992, '94 and '97 SoCon Coach of the Year; 1999 and 2001 East Region Coach-of-the-Year

Keith Aaron LeClair (February 26, 1966 – July 16, 2006) was an American athlete and later head baseball coach at Western Carolina University (Player, 1985–88 and Coach 1992–97). During his playing days, LeClair played for former Clemson head baseball coach Jack Leggett at Western Carolina. He was an All-Southern Conference selection in 1988 while earning SoCon Tournament MVP honors the same season. The former walk-on established Catamount baseball records for hits and total bases in a season. LeClair played on four consecutive Southern Conference championship Baseball teams (1985–88). He ranked in the top 10 in six different WCU hitting categories while posting a career .375 batting average and was named MVP of the 1988 Southern Conference Tournament (batted .600/12 RBI).

LeClair signed with the Atlanta Braves after completing his collegiate career and spent the summer of 1988 as an outfielder for Idaho Falls in the Pioneer League. After a spring training stint with the San Francisco Giants in 1989, he was offered a student assistant coaching position at Western Carolina, which led to full-time responsibilities shortly thereafter.

He became Western Carolina's head coach in 1992 and coached the Catamounts to three Southern Conference tournament titles and three Southern Conference regular season titles. LeClair was a three time Southern Conference Coach of the Year with a career record at WCU of 228–135–2.

LeClair became the head baseball coach at East Carolina University in 1997, coaching there until he was forced to step down by illness in 2002. LeClair became the second-winningest baseball coach in East Carolina history in just five seasons, compiling a 212–96–1 (.688) record. He guided the Pirates to four straight NCAA Regional appearances, three Colonial Athletic Association championships and one Conference USA title. He won the American Baseball Coaches Association's East Region Coach-of-the-Year award in both 1999 and 2001.

He was inducted into both the East Carolina University and Western Carolina Athletics Hall of Fame in the fall of 2002. LeClair was honored as the first recipient of the Conference USA Student-Athlete Advisory Committee's (SAAC) Coaches Choice Award. In addition, the Conference USA Baseball Coach-of-the-Year Award was named in honor of LeClair. Clark-LeClair Stadium opened on the campus of East Carolina University on March 4, 2005 and was named in honor of Coach LeClair and ECU alumnus Bill Clark. The Keith LeClair Classic has been played annually at East Carolina since 2004.

LeClair battled amyotrophic lateral sclerosis, commonly referred to as ALS or Lou Gehrig's Disease, for five years until his death on July 17, 2006.

Coaching Third: The Keith LeClair Story by Bethany Bradsher was published in 2010 (Whitecaps Media, ISBN 978-0-9826353-0-8).

== Head coaching record ==
The following is a table of Keith LeClair's yearly records as an NCAA head baseball coach.

Record table
Season	Team	Overall	Conference	Standing	Postseason
Western Carolina Catamounts (Southern Conference) (1992–1997)
1992	Western Carolina	44–21–1	17–4	1st	NCAA Regional
1993	Western Carolina	34–28	15–6	2nd	NCAA Regional
1994	Western Carolina	44–18	19–4	1st	NCAA Regional
1995	Western Carolina	32–24	13–11	3rd	
1996	Western Carolina	32–24–1	17–7	2nd	
1997	Western Carolina	42–20	18–6	1st	NCAA Regional
Western Carolina:		228–135–2	99–38		
East Carolina Pirates (Colonial Athletic Association) (1998–2001)
1998	East Carolina	30–29	10–11	Tie–4th	
1999	East Carolina	46–16	14–6	2nd	NCAA Regional
2000	East Carolina	46–18	14–7	Tie–1st	NCAA Regional
2001	East Carolina	47–13	19–2	1st	NCAA Super Regional
East Carolina:		169–76	57–26		
East Carolina Pirates (Conference USA) (2002)
2002	East Carolina	43–20–1	16–13–1	6th	NCAA Regional
East Carolina:		43–20-1	16–13–1		
Total:		440–231–3			
National champion Postseason invitational champion Conference regular season champion Conference regular season and conference tournament champion Division regular season champion Division regular season and conference tournament champion Conference tournament champion
