= Rodney Hennon =

American baseball player and coach (born 1969)

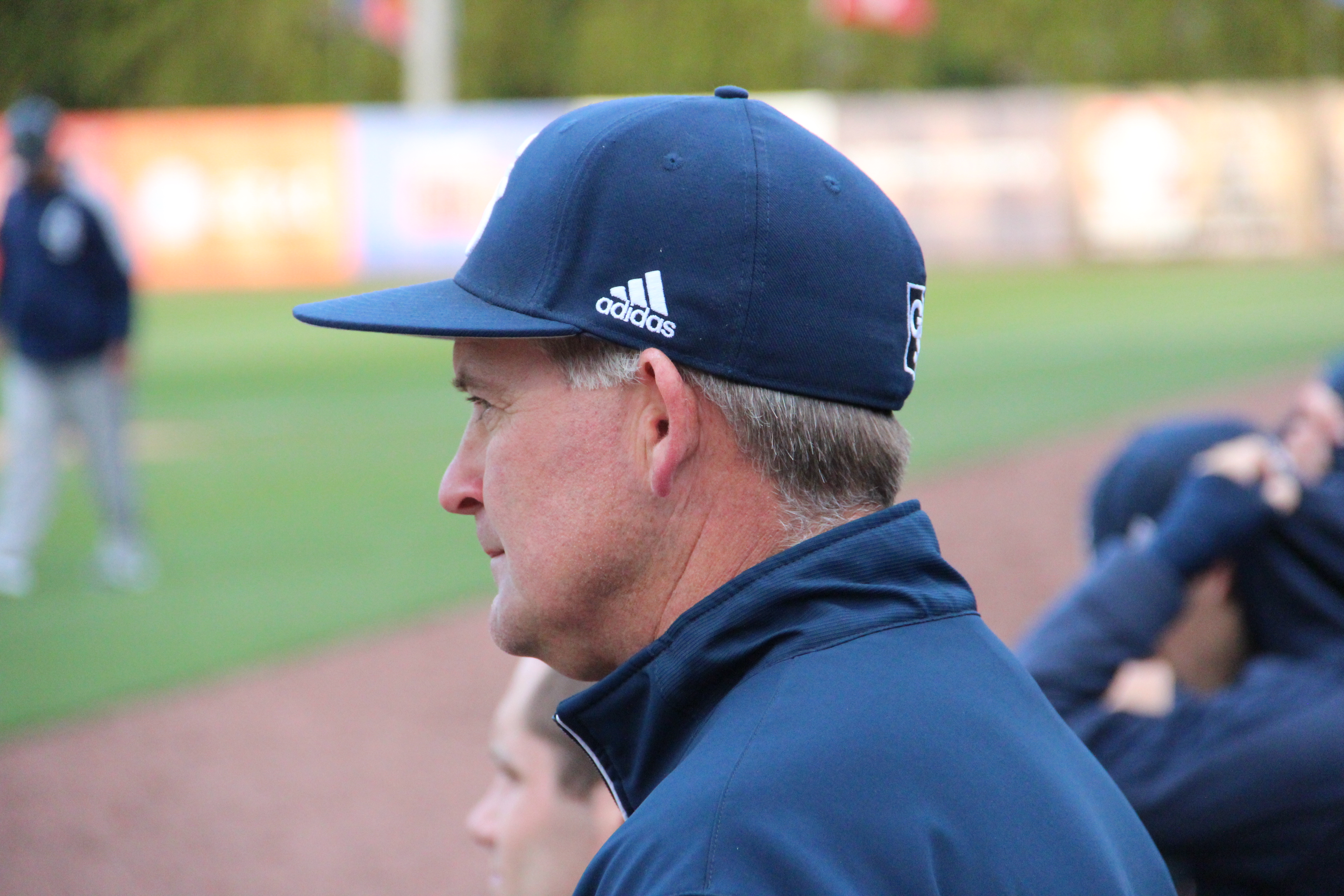
- Hennon in 2014

Current position
- Title: Head coach
- Team: Georgia Southern
- Conference: Sun Belt
- Record: 899–661

Biographical details
- Born: November 11, 1969 (age 56); Dalton, Georgia, U.S.

Playing career
- 1990–1993: Western Carolina
- Position: OF

Coaching career (HC unless noted)
- 1994–1997: Western Carolina (assistant)
- 1998–1999: Western Carolina
- 2000–present: Georgia Southern

Head coaching record
- Overall: 980-699
- Tournaments: Sun Belt: 15–10; NCAA: 3–12

Accomplishments and honors

Championships
- 6x Southern Conference baseball tournament: 2000, 2001, 2002, 2009, 2011, 2014; 2x Southern Conference: 2000, 2001: Sun Belt East Division 2019

Awards
- 2x SoCon Coach of the Year: 2000, 2001

Rodney Hennon (born November 11, 1969) is an American college baseball coach, currently serving as head coach of the Georgia Southern Eagles baseball team. He has held that position since the 2000 season. He played at Western Carolina, where he earned All-Conference honors and helped the team to two NCAA Regional appearances. He played professionally for one season with the Kentucky Rifles before turning to coaching. He served as an assistant coach at Western Carolina for four years before ascending to the top job. After two seasons, he moved to Georgia Southern. In his first two seasons with the Eagles he was named Southern Conference Baseball Coach of the Year.

== Head coaching record ==
Below is a table of the years that Hennon has been a head coach.

Record table
Season	Team	Overall	Conference	Standing	Postseason
Western Carolina Catamounts (Southern Conference) (1998–1999)
1998	Western Carolina	45–15	20–6	3rd	
1999	Western Carolina	36–23	18–10	3rd	
Western Carolina:		81–38	38–16		
Georgia Southern Eagles (Southern Conference) (2000–2014)
2000	Georgia Southern	38–23	23–7	1st	NCAA Regional
2001	Georgia Southern	42–20	21–9	1st	
2002	Georgia Southern	39–25	18–11	4th	NCAA Regional
2003	Georgia Southern	39–21	19–10	2nd	
2004	Georgia Southern	34–25	21–9	3rd	
2005	Georgia Southern	38–22	18–11	2nd	
2006	Georgia Southern	31–27	16–11	4th	
2007	Georgia Southern	34–28	13–14	6th	
2008	Georgia Southern	33–25	16–11	4th	
2009	Georgia Southern	42–17	20–8	2nd	NCAA Regional
2010	Georgia Southern	34–24	19–11	4th	
2011	Georgia Southern	36–26	18–12	5th	NCAA Regional
2012	Georgia Southern	33–27	15–15	6th	
2013	Georgia Southern	27–32	13–17	7th	
2014	Georgia Southern	40–23	15–12	3rd	NCAA Regional
Georgia Southern:			265–168		
Georgia Southern Eagles (Sun Belt Conference) (2015–present)
2015	Georgia Southern	30–27	18–12	4th	Sun Belt tournament
2016	Georgia Southern	36–24	16–14	6th	Sun Belt tournament
2017	Georgia Southern	38–21	18–12	3rd (East)	Sun Belt tournament
2018	Georgia Southern	30–26	18–11	T-3rd (east)	Sun Belt tournament
2019	Georgia Southern	35–24	18–12	1st (East)	Sun Belt tournament
2020	Georgia Southern	11–5	0–0	(East)	Season canceled due to COVID-19
2021	Georgia Southern	34–23	14–10	2nd (East)	Sun Belt tournament
2022	Georgia Southern	41–20	23–7	2nd	NCAA Regional
2023	Georgia Southern	27–29	16–14	5th (East)	Sun Belt Tournament
2024	Georgia Southern	33–26	17–13	T-1st (East)	Sun Belt Tournament
2025	Georgia Southern	28–31	13–17	T-9th	Sun Belt Tournament
2026	Georgia Southern	16–40	7–23	14th	
Georgia Southern:		899–661	178–145		
Total:		980–699			
National champion Postseason invitational champion Conference regular season champion Conference regular season and conference tournament champion Division regular season champion Division regular season and conference tournament champion Conference tournament champion

== See also ==
- List of current NCAA Division I baseball coaches
