= 2021 Colonial Athletic Association baseball tournament =

American college baseball tournament

- Teams: 6
- Format: Double-elimination tournament
- Finals site: Brooks Field; Wilmington, North Carolina
- Champions: Northeastern (1st title)
- Winning coach: Mike Glavine (1st title)
- MVP: Ben Malgeri (Northeastern)

2021 Colonial Athletic Association baseball standings
| | Conf. | | | | Overall |
| Team | W | | L | PCT | W | | L | PCT |
|---|---|---|---|---|---|---|---|---|
North
| Northeastern ^{x}‍‍‡‍^{y} | 20 | – | 3 | .870 | 36 | – | 12 | .750 |
| Towson ‍‍‍ | 11 | – | 12 | .478 | 21 | – | 36 | .368 |
| Hofstra ‍‍‍ | 8 | – | 16 | .333 | 17 | – | 22 | .436 |
| Delaware ‍‍‍ | 8 | – | 16 | .333 | 12 | – | 22 | .353 |
South
| UNC Wilmington ^{x}‍‍‍ | 13 | – | 8 | .619 | 32 | – | 22 | .593 |
| Elon ‍‍‍ | 10 | – | 8 | .556 | 22 | – | 22 | .500 |
| College of Charleston ‍‍‍ | 12 | – | 12 | .500 | 27 | – | 25 | .519 |
| William & Mary ‍‍‍ | 10 | – | 14 | .417 | 14 | – | 29 | .326 |
| James Madison ‍‍‍ | 6 | – | 9 | .400 | 11 | – | 17 | .393 |
x – Division champion ‡ – Tournament champion y – Invited to the NCAA tournament As of June 5, 2021; Rankings from D1Baseball

The 2021 Colonial Athletic Association baseball tournament was held at Brooks Field in Wilmington, North Carolina, from May 25 through 30. The Northeastern Huskies won the tournament, their first CAA victory, and earned the Colonial Athletic Association's automatic bid to the 2021 NCAA Division I baseball tournament.

Entering the event, two-time defending champion UNC Wilmington had won the most championships among active teams, with six. James Madison and William & Mary had claimed two titles, while College of Charleston, Delaware, and Towson each had one. Former member East Carolina won 7 titles during their tenure in the conference.

The 2020 Tournament was cancelled due to the COVID-19 pandemic, and so no champion was crowned.

== Seeding and format ==
The CAA Tournament operates under a double-elimination format.

== Tournament ==
Upper round 1 | Upper round 2 | Upper final | Final
1 | Northeastern | 10
4 | College of Charleston | 6 | 4 | College of Charleston | 3
5 | Towson | 5 | 1 | Northeastern | 4
2 | UNC Wilmington | 8
2 | UNC Wilmington | 2
3 | Elon | 7 | 3 | Elon | 0
6 | William & Mary | 3
2 | UNC Wilmington | 5 | 10
1 | Northeastern | 7 | 11
Lower round 1 | Lower round 2 | Lower round 3 | Lower final
4 | College of Charleston | 1
4 | College of Charleston | 6 | 1 | Northeastern | 5
6 | William & Mary | 3 | 3 | Elon | 2
5 | Towson | 3 | 4 | College of Charleston | 8
6 | William & Mary | 7
