= Charleston Cougars baseball =

Charleston Cougars
- 2026 Charleston Cougars baseball team
- Founded: 1991
- University: College of Charleston
- Head coach: Chad Holbrook (9th season)
- Conference: Colonial Athletic
- Location: Charleston, South Carolina
- Home stadium: CofC Baseball Stadium at Patriot's Point (Capacity: 2,000)
- Nickname: Cougars
- Colors: Maroon and white

NCAA regional champions
- 2006, 2014

NCAA tournament appearances
- 2004, 2005, 2006, 2010, 2012, 2014, 2015

Conference tournament champions
- SoCon: 2006; CAA: 2014

Conference regular season champions
- SoCon: 2004, 2005, 2007, 2012; CAA: 2015, 2022, 2024

The Charleston Cougars baseball team is a varsity intercollegiate athletic team of the College of Charleston in Charleston, South Carolina, United States. The team is a member of the Colonial Athletic Association, which is part of the National Collegiate Athletic Association's Division I. The team plays its home games at CofC Baseball Stadium at Patriot's Point in Mount Pleasant, South Carolina. The Cougars are currently coached by Chad Holbrook, who was previously the head coach at the University of South Carolina.

== History ==
The College of Charleston baseball team has been a member of NCAA Division I since 1991. The Cougars have won six regular season conference titles and two conference tournament championships, one in the Southern Conference (2006) and one in the Colonial Athletic Association (2014). The Cougars have appeared in the NCAA Division I baseball tournament seven times, most recently in 2015. They have advanced to the Super Regional round of the NCAA tournament twice (2006, 2014), accounting for their deepest postseason run. The Cougars swept the 2006 Lexington Regional and the 2014 Gainesville Regional, before falling to Georgia Tech and Texas Tech, respectively.

From 2009 until 2015, the Cougars were coached by Monte Lee, a former player for Charleston. During Lee's tenure at CofC, the Cougars went 276–145, qualifying for the NCAA tournament in four of Lee's six seasons. Lee coached three players that were drafted in the first five rounds in the MLB Draft: Taylor Clarke (3rd RD, 2015), Carl Wise (4th RD, 2015) and Heath Hembree (5th RD, 2010), who reached MLB in 2013. Lee left Charleston after the 2015 season to take the same position with the Clemson Tigers.

In 2017, Chad Holbrook was hired on as head coach after a four year stint with South Carolina. Chad was previously recruiter of the year and assistant coach of the year as an assistant coach with South Carolina lead the Gamecocks to the NCAA Super Regionals twice during his tenure as head coach. In 2022, the Cougars were the CAA regular season champions for the first time since 2015.

Charleston has produced 28 college All-Americans and 62 professional players, including Brett Gardner of the New York Yankees. From 2004 to 2015, the College of Charleston has the 13th best winning percentage in all of Division I baseball. Oliver Marmol, the current manager of the St. Louis Cardinals, is a former Cougar baseball player.

== Year-by-year results ==
Charleston's history since joining Division I in 1991.

Cougars yearly records
| Year | Overall record | Conference record | Accomplishments |
|---|---|---|---|
| 1991 | 22–12–1 | Ind | |
| 1992 | 16–29 | 2–19 (TAAC) | |
| 1993 | 18–24 | 9–9 (TAAC) | |
| 1994 | 27–21 | 7–11 (TAAC) | |
| 1995 | 17–29 | 8–22 (TAAC) | |
| 1996 | 28–23 | 8–10 (TAAC) | |
| 1997 | 25–29–1 | 7–11 (TAAC) | |
| 1998 | 31–26 | 9–9 (TAAC) | |
| 1999 | 31–24 | 19–10 (SoCon) | |
| 2000 | 28–28–1 | 14–15–1 (SoCon) | |
| 2001 | 24–28 | 10–16 (SoCon) | |
| 2002 | 36–22 | 19–11 (SoCon) | |
| 2003 | 31–27 | 17–13 (SoCon) | |
| 2004 | 47–16 | 25–5 (SoCon) | SoCon Regular season Champions, NCAA Regional |
| 2005 | 48–15 | 27–3 (SoCon) | SoCon Regular season Champions, NCAA Regional |
| 2006 | 46–17 | 20–7 (SoCon) | SoCon Tournament champions, NCAA Super Regional |
| 2007 | 39–19 | 20–7 (SoCon) | SoCon Regular season Champions |
| 2008 | 39–20 | 19–8 (SoCon) | |
| 2009 | 35–22 | 17–13 (SoCon) | |
| 2010 | 44–19 | 22–8 (SoCon) | NCAA Regional |
| 2011 | 39–22 | 18–12 (SoCon) | |
| 2012 | 38–22 | 21–9 (SoCon) | SoCon Regular season Champions, NCAA Regional |
| 2013 | 31–26 | 17–13 (SoCon) | |
| 2014 | 44–19 | 15–6 (CAA) | CAA Tournament champions, NCAA Super Regional |
| 2015 | 45–15 | 21–3 (CAA) | CAA Regular season Champions, NCAA Regional |
| 2016 | 31–25–1 | 12–12 (CAA) | |
| 2017 | 28–31 | 13–11 (CAA) | |
| 2018 | 36-19 | 15-8 (CAA) | |
| 2019 | 36-21 | 16-8 (CAA) | |
| 2020 | 12-2 | 0-0 (CAA) | Season cancelled |
| 2021 | 27-25 | 12-12 (CAA) | |
| 2022 | 37-19 | 19-5 (CAA) | CAA Regular season Champions |
| 2023 | 36-22 | 18-12 (CAA) | |
| 2024 | 41-14 | 21-5 (CAA) | CAA Regular season Champions |
| 2025 | 37-22 | 15-12 (CAA) | |

== NCAA tournament results ==
Charleston has appeared in the NCAA Division I Baseball Championship seven times, most recently in 2015 when the Cougars lost in the Tallahassee Regional final to Florida State. Charleston's overall record in the NCAA tournament is 14–14.

| Year | Seed | Round | Opponents | Results |
|---|---|---|---|---|
| 2004 | #3 | Baton Rouge Regional | #2 Southern Mississippi #4 Army #2 Southern Mississippi #1 LSU | L 6–5; W 2–1; W 7–3; L 11–3 |
| 2005 | #2 | Clemson Regional | #3 Oral Roberts #1 Clemson #3 Oral Roberts | W 5–2; L 6–0; L 6–0 |
| 2006 | #2 | Lexington Regional | #3 Notre Dame #4 Ball State #1 Kentucky | W 5–4; W 11–0; W 7–4 |
| **2006** | #2 | **Atlanta Super Regional** | #1 Georgia Tech | L 5–0; L 12–3 |
| 2010 | #2 | Myrtle Beach Regional | #3 NC State #1 Coastal Carolina #1 Coastal Carolina #1 Coastal Carolina | W 9–6; W 16–6; L 8–7; L 11–10 |
| 2012 | #3 | Gainesville Regional | #2 Georgia Tech #4 Bethune-Cookman #2 Georgia Tech | L 8–4; W 8–2; L 3–0 |
| 2014 | #4 | Gainesville Regional | #1 Florida #2 Long Beach State #2 Long Beach State | W 3–2; W 6–3; W 4–2 |
| **2014** | #4 | **Lubbock Super Regional** | #1 Texas Tech | L 1–0; L 1–0 |
| 2015 | #2 | Tallahassee Regional | #3 Auburn #1 Florida State #3 Auburn #1 Florida State | W 7–6; L 3–2; W 3–2; L 8–1 |

(Bold indicates furthest advancement.)

== Major League Baseball ==
The College of Charleston has had 60 Major League Baseball draft selections since the draft began in 1965. In 2015, pitcher Taylor Clarke eclipsed outfielder Brett Gardner as the highest Charleston player ever drafted, as Clarke was the first pick of the third round (76th overall) which bested Gardner's 109th overall selection in the third round of 2005.

Cougars in the Major League Baseball Draft
| Year | Player | Round | Team |
|---|---|---|---|
| 1981 | Jeffrey Barnes | 26 | Rangers |
| 1991 | Tony Rodriguez | 10 | Red Sox |
| 1992 | Dave Pyc | 19 | Dodgers |
| 1998 | Donato Calandriello | 7 | Athletics |
| 1999 | Monte Lee | 39 | Cardinals |
| 1999 | Scott Oliver | 8 | Yankees |
| 2003 | Matt Lauderdale | 9 | Padres |
| 2003 | Lee Curtis | 8 | Red Sox |
| 2005 | Reid Price | 29 | Cardinals |
| 2005 | D.J. Wabick | 25 | Mets |
| 2005 | Kevin Bulger | 25 | Royals |
| 2005 | Ryan Edell | 8 | Indians |
| 2005 | Brett Harker | 5 | Phillies |
| 2005 | Brett Gardner | 3 | Yankees |
| 2006 | Graham Godfrey | 34 | Blue Jays |
| 2006 | Larry Cobb | 27 | Athletics |
| 2006 | Joshua McLaughlin | 20 | Athletics |
| 2007 | Michael Harrington | 38 | Orioles |
| 2007 | Ben Lasater | 29 | Marlins |
| 2007 | Michael Bunton | 26 | Cubs |
| 2007 | Brian Schlitter | 16 | Phillies |
| 2007 | Nicholas Chigges | 13 | Yankees |
| 2007 | Alex Garabedian | 8 | Dodgers |
| 2007 | Oliver Marmol | 6 | Cardinals |
| 2008 | Danny Meszaros | 48 | Astros |
| 2008 | Brandon Sizemore | 46 | Cardinals |
| 2008 | Clayton Caulfield | 38 | Yankees |
| 2008 | Jake Goldberg | 36 | Mets |
| 2008 | Mike Lynn | 30 | Mets |
| 2008 | Austin Garrett | 25 | Nationals |
| 2008 | Michael Kohn | 13 | Angels |
| 2008 | Michael Harrington | 13 | Twins |
| 2008 | Jeremie Tice | 6 | Indians |
| 2009 | Jesse Simpson | 40 | Cardinals |
| 2009 | Brandon Sizemore | 30 | Brewers |
| 2009 | Joey Bergman | 22 | Cardinals |
| 2009 | Matthew Mansilla | 22 | Tigers |
| 2010 | Casey Lucchese | 39 | Cubs |
| 2010 | Kevin Decker | 39 | Pirates |
| 2010 | Joey Bergman | 33 | Cardinals |
| 2010 | Robert Kral | 16 | Reds |
| 2010 | Heath Hembree | 5 | Giants |
| 2011 | David Peterson | 49 | Astros |
| 2011 | Casey Lucchese | 38 | Cubs |
| 2011 | Matt Leeds | 31 | Rangers |
| 2011 | Robert Kral | 10 | Padres |
| 2012 | David Peterson | 8 | Braves |
| 2012 | Christian Powell | 8 | Twins |
| 2012 | Marty Gantt | 7 | Rays |
| 2013 | Jacob Zokan | 9 | Mariners |
| 2014 | Gunnar Heidt | 13 | Blue Jays |
| 2015 | Taylor Clarke | 3 | Diamondbacks |
| 2015 | Carl Wise | 4 | Blue Jays |
| 2015 | Blake Butler | 15 | Reds |
| 2016 | Bradley Jones | 18 | Blue Jays |
| 2017 | Bailey Ober | 12 | Twins |
| 2018 | Evan Sisk | 16 | Cardinals |
| 2018 | Luke Morgan | 20 | Rockies |
| 2019 | Nate Ocker | 29 | Guardians |
| 2019 | Griffin McLarty | 8 | Orioles |
| 2023 | William Privette | 13 | Rangers |
| 2024 | Cole Mathis | 2 | Cubs |
| 2025 | Jake Brink | 11 | Reds |

== See also ==
- List of NCAA Division I baseball programs
