= 2005 Rhode Island Rams baseball team =

College baseball team from 2005

2005 Rhode Island Rams baseball

Atlantic 10 regular season champion Atlantic 10 East Division champion Atlantic 10 tournament champions

NCAA tournament, Long Beach Regional
- Conference: Atlantic 10 Conference
- Record: 34–21 (18–6 A10)
- Head coach: Frank Leoni (13th season)
- Assistant coaches: Jim Foster (1st season); Steven Breitbach (3rd season)
- Home stadium: Bill Beck Field

2005 Atlantic 10 Conference baseball standings
	Conf.						Overall
Team	W		L		T	PCT	W		L		T	PCT
East
Rhode Island ^{x}‍†‍‡‍^{y}	18	–	6	–	0	.750	34	–	21	–	0	.618
Fordham ‍‍‍	17	–	7	–	0	.708	34	–	21	–	0	.618
Massachusetts ‍‍‍	9	–	15	–	0	.375	16	–	33	–	0	.327
St. Bonaventure ‍‍‍	8	–	16	–	0	.333	24	–	25	–	0	.490
St. Joseph's ‍‍‍	8	–	16	–	0	.333	14	–	38	–	0	.269
Temple ‍‍‍	8	–	16	–	0	.333	17	–	33	–	0	.340
West
George Washington ^{x}‍‍‍	17	–	7	–	0	.708	41	–	19	–	0	.683
Dayton ‍‍‍	16	–	8	–	0	.667	36	–	23	–	0	.610
Duquesne ‍‍‍	13	–	11	–	0	.542	21	–	35	–	0	.375
Richmond ‍‍‍	12	–	12	–	0	.500	22	–	35	–	0	.386
La Salle ‍‍‍	9	–	15	–	0	.375	18	–	34	–	0	.346
Xavier ‍‍‍	9	–	15	–	0	.375	17	–	35	–	0	.327
† – Conference champion ‡ – Tournament champion y – Invited to the NCAA tournament As of May 28, 2005; Rankings from D1Baseball

The 2005 Rhode Island Rams baseball team represented the University of Rhode Island during the 2005 NCAA Division I baseball season. The Rams played their home games at Bill Beck Field as a member of the Atlantic 10 Conference. They were led by head coach Frank Leoni in his thirteenth and final year as manager.

The Rams won the East Division championship, notching a 34–21 (18–6) record. In the 2005 Atlantic 10 Conference baseball tournament, the Rams clinched the top seed, and the bye-round, and defeated sixth-seeded Richmond and second-seeded George Washington in the championship game en route to their first-ever NCAA Division I baseball tournament as a four seed, where they were knocked out in the first round by top seeded Long Beach State and third-seeded Pepperdine. After the conclusion of the tournament, Leoni accepted the job at fellow Atlantic 10 Conference member William & Mary to be the head coach of the Tribe. The Rams would not make another appearance in the NCAA Division I baseball tournament until 2016.

== Background Information ==
The University of Rhode Island opened in 1889, following the Second Morrill Act, an amendment to the pre-existing Land Grant Act. The baseball team was founded in 1898 and began to play on and off throughout the years before finding consistency in 1907. Rhode Island had rarely featured successful teams throughout the years prior to Frank Leoni's hiring as manager in 1993. Leoni was a starter on Rhode Island's baseball team from 1988–1990, playing shortstop for the Rams. When hired in 1993, he was the youngest head coach in modern history of NCAA Division I baseball. He immediately began a winning culture in Rhode Island.

=== Previous season ===
The 2004 team finished 35–20–1 (20–4) overall, becoming just the second Atlantic 10 Conference member to win 20 conference games in a season. The top seed overall in the 2004 Atlantic 10 Conference baseball tournament, the Rams lost to fourth-seeded St. Bonaventure in the first round before defeating second-seed St. Bonaventure and third-seeded Richmond in the losers’ bracket before falling to the Bonnies again in the championship game. The Rams failed to clinch an at-large bid into the 2004 NCAA Division I baseball tournament.

== Preseason ==
Rhode Island starting pitcher Zach Zuercher was named to Collegiate Baseball Newspaper's Second-Team All-American list.

Preseason All-American Second Team.
Player	No.	Position	Class
Zach Zuercher	25	P	Junior

Rhode Island was predicted to win the Atlantic-10 Conference and make their first ever NCAA Tournament appearance.

== Roster ==
2005 Rhode Island Rams baseball team
Players
Coaches

#	Pos.	Name	B/T	Height	Weight	Year	Home town
1	OF	Daryl Holcomb	L/R	5 ft 8 in (1.73 m)	180 lb (82 kg)	Jr	Wilmington, DE
2	INF	Joe Viscuso	R/R	5 ft 11 in (1.8 m)	180 lb (82 kg)	Sr	Farmingdale, NY
3	OF	Dave Savard	R/R	5 ft 8 in (1.73 m)	160 lb (73 kg)	So	Nashua, NH
4	OF	CJ Simons	R/R	6 ft 2 in (1.88 m)	180 lb (82 kg)	Fr	Richmond, RI
5	RHP	James Norcott	R/R	5 ft 11 in (1.8 m)	175 lb (79 kg)	So	Norton, MA
6	RHP	Jamie Delgidio	R/R	5 ft 9 in (1.75 m)	165 lb (75 kg)	Fr	Narragansett, RI
8	RHP	Steve Holmes	R/R	6 ft 2 in (1.88 m)	215 lb (98 kg)	So	Lincoln, RI
9	INF	Wayne Russo	R/R	5 ft 8 in (1.73 m)	165 lb (75 kg)	RS Jr	Warwick, RI
10	RHP	Mick Lefort	R/R	6 ft 2 in (1.88 m)	205 lb (93 kg)	So	Lincoln, RI
11	INF	Mike Rainville	L/R	6 ft 0 in (1.83 m)	200 lb (91 kg)	Sr	Pawtucket, RI
13	RHP	Brett Pulanski	R/R	6 ft 0 in (1.83 m)	160 lb (73 kg)	Fr	Nashua, NH
14	INF	Tom Venedam	R/R	6 ft 0 in (1.83 m)	190 lb (86 kg)	Jr	Suffern, NY
16	INF	Shaun Hagey	L/R	6 ft 1 in (1.85 m)	170 lb (77 kg)	Fr	Ephrata, PA
17	C	Zach Zaneski	R/R	6 ft 2 in (1.88 m)	180 lb (82 kg)	Fr	Waterford, CT
18	C	Josh Nestor	R/R	6 ft 2 in (1.88 m)	220 lb (100 kg)	Jr	Nashua, NH
19	RHP	Matthew Bruderek	R/R	6 ft 3 in (1.91 m)	195 lb (88 kg)	Fr	Norrtion, PA
21	RHP	Matt Miranda	R/R	5 ft 11 in (1.8 m)	170 lb (77 kg)	RS Fr	Suffern, NY
22	LHP	Mike Harris	L/L	6 ft 2 in (1.88 m)	190 lb (86 kg)	Sr	Old Bethpage, NY
23	RHP	Dan Frederick	R/R	6 ft 4 in (1.93 m)	220 lb (100 kg)	Sr	Dracut, MA
24	LHP	Adam Perkins	L/L	6 ft 3 in (1.91 m)	170 lb (77 kg)	RS So	Hudson, NH
25	LHP	Zach Zuercher	L/L	6 ft 3 in (1.91 m)	205 lb (93 kg)	Jr	Warwick, RI
26	INF	Chris Stelma	R/R	6 ft 2 in (1.88 m)	180 lb (82 kg)	Sr	Glenwood, NJ
27	OF	Matt Sullivan	R/R	6 ft 3 in (1.91 m)	215 lb (98 kg)	Sr	Nashua, NH
28	RHP	Gil Pena	R/R	6 ft 1 in (1.85 m)	200 lb (91 kg)	RS Jr	Warwick, RI
29	C	Scott Brown	L/R	6 ft 2 in (1.88 m)	195 lb (88 kg)	So	Portland, ME
30	RHP	Dave Lipson	R/R	6 ft 1 in (1.85 m)	200 lb (91 kg)	Jr	Norwalk, CT
33	INF	Ryan Cunningham	R/R	6 ft 3 in (1.91 m)	200 lb (91 kg)	So	Centreville, VA
35	C	James Deady	R/R	6 ft 2 in (1.88 m)	175 lb (79 kg)	Fr	Cranston, RI

Head coach

7 Frank Leoni

Assistant coach(es)

Jim Foster
Steven Breitbach

Legend

- (C) Team captain
- (S) Suspended
- (I) Ineligible
- Injured
- Current redshirt

Roster
Last update: January 22, 2024

== Season ==
=== Regular season ===
Rhode Island began their season on a rough patch, losing eight out of their first ten games to No. 12 Florida, Maryland, Central Michigan, IPFW, Sacred Heart, Kentucky and Miami (Ohio). The Rams did not capture their first win until March 13, upsetting SEC member Kentucky 7–5. Rhode Island kept their losing skid going throughout the month of March. Once April hit, however, and conference play began, Rhode Island began a tear throughout their schedule. After going 6–11 throughout February and March, Rhode Island went 15–4 throughout the entirety of April, with highlight wins against division rivals Richmond, St. Bonaventure and Temple. They continued their surge, with a commanding 12-game winning streak heading into the month of May. Rhode Island clinched the Atlantic-10 Regular Season title on May 14 with an 8–0 at Massachusetts.

=== Atlantic 10 Tournament ===
After finishing 34–21 (and 18–6 in conference), Rhode Island would clinch the number one overall seed in the 2005 Atlantic 10 Conference baseball tournament. The Rams would not look back, defeating #4 seed Dayton 7–4 in the quarterfinals and #6 seeded Richmond 8–3. In a rematch of the Atlantic 10 Championship game from the previous year, Rhode Island would defeat #2 seeded George Washington 9–7 to clinch Rhode Island's first ever NCAA tournament berth in college history. Second-baseman Wayne Russo would win the tournament's Most Outstanding Player, after going 7–11 hitting with a .636 batting average, two doubles and three RBIs, and catcher Josh Nestor and outfielders Daryl Holcomb and David Savard would join Russo in the All-Tournament Team, with Nestor making his second straight All-Tournament Team.

Atlantic 10 tournament teams
(1) Rhode Island Rams	(2) George Washington Colonials	(3) Fordham Rams	(4) Dayton Flyers	(5) Duquesne Dukes	(6) Richmond Spiders

Upper round 1
5	Duquesne	5
4	Dayton	8
6	Richmond	4^{13}
3	Fordham	1
Lower round 1
5	Duquesne	9
3	Fordham	4
4	Dayton	13
5	Duquesne	9

Upper round 2
1	Rhode Island	7
4	Dayton	4
2	George Washington	3
6	Richmond	10
Lower round 2
2	George Washington	4
4	Dayton	2

Upper final
1	Rhode Island	8
6	Richmond	3
Lower final
6	Richmond	4
2	George Washington	10

Final
1	Rhode Island	9
2	George Washington	7

=== NCAA Tournament ===
The Rams clinched the number four seed in the Long Beach Regional, joining number one seeded Long Beach State (hosts of the regional), second-seeded USC and third-seeded Pepperdine in Long Beach.The Rams' first taste of the tournament would be cut short, however, as an 11–2 defeat to Long Beach State in the first round, and a 2–1 walk-off defeat in the sudden death loser's bracket to Pepperdine would eliminate the Rams in the first two days of the tournament. USC would wind up defeating Long Beach State to advance to the Corvallis Super Regional, where they were promptly knocked out by Oregon State, whom clinched a berth to the College World Series. Following the tournament, Frank Leoni accepted the job at conference-rival William & Mary. Jim Foster would promptly be hired by Rhode Island to succeed Leoni.

Long Beach Regional teams
(1) Long Beach State Dirtbags	(2) USC Trojans	(3) Pepperdine Waves	(4) Rhode Island Rams

First round	Second round
1	Oregon State	4
4	Ohio State	3
1	Oregon State	11
3	St. John's	1
3	St. John's	5
2	Virginia	3
Corvallis Regional–Goss Stadium
4	Ohio State	2
2	Virginia	1
4	Ohio State	1
3	St. John's	11
1	Long Beach State	11
4	Rhode Island	2
1	Long Beach State	4
2	Southern California	6
3	Pepperdine	3
2	Southern California	7
Long Beach Regional–Blair Field
4	Rhode Island	1
3	Pepperdine	2
3	Pepperdine	6
1	Long Beach State	3

Regional finals
1	Oregon State	19	—
3	St. John's	3	—
2	Southern California	2	5
3	Pepperdine	9	2

Super regionals
8	Oregon State	10	8	10
Southern California	4	9	8

== Game log ==
2005 Rhode Island Rams baseball game log (34–21)
Regular season (31–19)
February (0–2)

Date	Opponent	Rank	Stadium	Score	Win	Loss	Save	Overall	A10	Sources
February 25	at No. 12 Florida*		Condron Ballpark; Gainesville, Florida	**L** 4–5	Horne (1–0)	**Frederick (0–1)**	—	0–1	—	
February 26	at No. 12 Florida*		Condron Ballpark	**L** 0–6	Ball (2–0)	**Zuercher (0–1)**	—	0–2	—	
February 27	at No. 12 Florida*		Condron Ballpark	Canceled (Inclement weather)				0–2	—	

March (5–9)

Date	Opponent	Rank	Stadium	Score	Win	Loss	Save	Overall	A10	Sources
March 5	at Maryland*		Bob "Turtle" Smith Stadium; College Park, Maryland	Canceled (Inclement weather)				0–2	—	
March 6	at Maryland*		Bob "Turtle" Smith Stadium	Canceled (Inclement weather)				0–2	—	
March 11	Central Michigan*		IMG Academy Park; Bradenton, Florida	**L** 1–5	Cairns (2–1)	**Pina (0–1)**	Pung (2)	0–3	—	
March 11	IPFW*		IMG Academy Park	**L** 2–4	Uebelhor (2–1)	**Holmes (0–1)**	–	0–4	—	
March 12	Sacred Heart*		Twin Lakes Park; Sarasota, Florida	**L** 3–4	Aldrich	**Norcott (0–1)**	Monti	0–5	—	
March 13	Kentucky*		Robert C. Wynn Baseball Field; Sarasota, Florida	**L** 5–8	Gibson (3–0)	**Frederick (0–2)**	—	0–6	—	
March 13	Kentucky*		Robert C. Wynn Baseball Field	**W** 7–5	**Perkins (1–0)**	Tennyson (3–1)	**Lefort (1)**	1–6	—	
March 14	Northern Iowa*		IMG Academy Field	**L** 4–9	Westphal (2–1)	**Palanski (0–1)**	Westphal (2)	1–7	—	
March 17	Fairleigh Dickinson*		IMG Academy Field	Canceled (Inclement weather)				1–7	—	
March 18	Miami (OH)*		Twin Lakes Park	**L** 2–5	Oberschlake (1–0)	**Zuercher (0–2)**	Graham (2)	1–8	—	
March 18	Miami (OH)*		Twin Lakes Park	**W** 4–2	**Holmes (1–0)**	Antoniotti (0–1)	**Lefort (2)**	2–8	—	
March 19	Wisconsin-Milwaukee*		IMG Academy Field	**L** 9–12	Sorenson (2–2)	**Venedam (0–1)**	–	2–9	—	
March 22	at LIU Brooklyn*		Long Island University Field; Brooklyn, New York	**W** 7–2	**Perkins (2–0)**	Yawger (0–2)	**Lefort (3)**	3–8	—	
March 23	Sacred Heart*		The Ballpark at Harbor Yard; Bridgeport, Connecticut	Canceled (Inclement weather)				3–8	—	–
March 26	at George Washington		Barcroft Park; Arlington, Virginia	**L** 3–8	Lutz (2–0)	**Frederick (0–3)**	—	3–10	0–1	
March 26	at George Washington		Barcroft Park	**W** 6–1	**Zuercher (1–2)**	Wilkie (1–2)	—	4–9	1–1	
March 27	at George Washington		Barcroft Park	**W** 8–6	**Venedam (1–1)**	Brookens (0–1)	**Lefort (4)**	5–10	2–1	
March 30	Hartford*		Bill Beck Field; North Kingston, Rhode Island	**W** 11–4	**Perkins (3–0)**	Krajeski (0–1)	–	6–10	2–1	
March 31	Boston College*		Eddie Pellagrini Diamond at John Shea Field; Chestnut Hill, Massachusetts	**L** 3–7	Doyle (2–0)	**Norcott (0–2)**	Asselin (2)	6–11	2–1	

April (16–4)

Date	Opponent	Rank	Stadium	Score	Win	Loss	Save	Overall	A10	Sources
April 3	at Dayton		Time Warner Cable Stadium; Dayton, Ohio	**W** 4–1	**Frederick (1–3)**	Stammen (4–3)	**Lefort (5)**	7–11	3–1	
April 3	at Dayton		Time Warner Cable Stadium	**W** 7–6	**Perkins (4–0)**	Rohren (0–2)	**Lefort (6)**	8–11	4–1	
April 4	at Dayton		Time Warner Cable Stadium	**L** 4–9	Lindsay (2–1)	**Venedam (1–2)**	–	8–12	4–2	
April 6	Brown*		Bill Beck Field	**L** 3–8	Silverstein (2–1)	**Norcott (0–3)**	Moskal (1)	8–13	4–2	
April 6	Brown*		Bill Beck Field	**L** 5–8	Silverman (2–1)	**Perkins (4–1)**	—	8–14	4–2	
April 9	Richmond		Bill Beck Field	**W** 10–1	**Frederick (2–3)**	Berzinskas (2–4)	—	9–13	5–2	
April 9	Richmond		Bill Beck Field	**W** 14–1	**Zuercher (2–2)**	Jones (2–2)	—	10–14	6–2	
April 10	Richmond		Bill Beck Field	**W** 9–4	**Holmes (2–1)**	Duclos (1–1)	–	11–14	7–2	
April 12	Iona*		Bill Beck Field	**W** 14–0	**Perkins (5–1)**	Carmody ()	–	12–14	7–2	
April 13	at Fairfield*		Alumni Baseball Diamond; Fairfield, Connecticut	**W** 21–1	**Norcott (1–3)**	Gruber ()	–	13–14	7–2	
April 16	at Temple		Ambler Field; Philadelphia, Pennsylvania	**W** 4–2	**Venedam (2–2)**	Foulkrod (3–4)	**Lefort (7)**	14–14	8–2	
April 16	at Temple		Ambler Field	**L** 3–5	Weckenman (1–1)	**Zuercher (2–3)**	–	14–15	8–3	
April 17	at Temple		Ambler Field	**W** 11–5	**Holmes (3–1)**	Hamilton (0–1)	–	15–15	9–3	
April 21	at Central Connecticut*		Balf–Savin Field; New Haven, Connecticut	**W** 9–3	**Perkins (6–1)**	Vitelli (0–3)	–	16–15	9–3	
April 21	at Central Connecticut*		Balf–Savin Field	**W** 14–4	**Norcott (2–3)**	Cole (1–2)	–	17–15	9–3	
April 23	St. Bonaventure		Bill Beck Field	**W** 9–3	**Frederick (3–3)**	McCormack ()	–	18–15	10–3	
April 24	St. Bonaventure		Bill Beck Field	**W** 9–0	**Zuercher (3–3)**	Proctor (3–3)	–	19–15	11–3	
April 24	St. Bonaventure		Bill Beck Field	**W** 6–5	**Lefort (1–0)**	Pellegrini (1–2)	–	20–15	12–3	
April 27	at Northeastern		Parsons Field; Brookline, Massachusetts	Canceled (Inclement weather)				20–15	12–3	–
April 28	Harvard		Bill Beck Field	**W** 16–1	**Perkins (7–1)**	Warren (0–1)	–	21–15	12–3	

May (10–4)

Date	Opponent	Rank	Stadium	Score	Win	Loss	Save	Overall	A10	Sources
May 1	at Saint Joseph's		Latshaw/McCarthy Field; Camden, New Jersey	**W** 15–1	**Frederick (4–3)**	Hessler (2–5)	–	22–15	13–3	
May 1	at Saint Joseph's		Latshaw/McCarthy Field	**W** 1–0^{11}	**Lefort (2–0)**	**Morrison (2–3)**	–	23–15	14–3	
May 2	at Saint Joseph's		Latshaw/McCarthy Field	**W** 8–4	**Holmes (4–3)**	Gilbert (2–3)	**Venedam (1)**	24–15	15–3	
May 3	Holy Cross*		Bill Beck Field	**W** 11–3	**Perkins (8–1)**	O'Brien (0–2)	–	25–15	15–3	
May 5	Quinnipiac*		Bill Beck Field	**W** 9–1	**Norcott (3–3)**	Keefe (1–2)	–	26–15	15–3	
May 8	Fordham		Bill Beck Field	**L** 0–1	Riordan (9–3)	Frederick (4–4)	–	26–16	15–4	
May 8	Fordham		Bill Beck Field	**W** 6–3	**Zuercher (4–3)**	David (4–4)	–	27–16	16–4	
May 9	Fordham		Bill Beck Field	**W** 7–1	**Holmes (5–1)**	Martinez (4–5)	–	28–16	17–4	
May 10	UConn*		Bill Beck Field	**W** 8–3	**Perkins (9–1)**	Sirois (5–5)	**Norcott (1)**	29–16	17–4	
May 14	at UMass		Earl Lorden Field; Amherst, Massachusetts	**L** 1–3	Torra (5–3)	**Frederick (4–5)**	–	29–17	17–5	
May 14	at UMass		Earl Lorden Field	**W** 8–0	**Zuercher (5–3)**	Demers (1–8)	–	30–17	18–5	
May 15	at UMass		Earl Lorden Field	**L** 5–6^{14}	Lloyd (3–0)	**Perkins (9–2)**	–	30–18	18–6	
May 21	at Army*		Johnson Stadium at Doubleday Field; West Point, New York	**L** 5–9	Mayhew (5–1)	**Perkins (9–3)**	–	30–19	18–6	
May 21	at Army*		Johnson Stadium at Doubleday Field; West Point, New York	**W** 10–4	**Holmes (6–1)**	Kashner (9–3)	–	31–19	18–6	

Postseason
Atlantic 10 Tournament (3–0)

Date	Opponent	Rank	Stadium	Score	Win	Loss	Save	Overall	Postseason	Sources
May 26	vs. (4) Dayton; Quarterfinals	(1)	Fifth Third Field; Dayton, Ohio	**W** 7–4	**Frederick (5–5)**	Trubee (12–3)	**Lefort (8)**	32–19	1–0	
May 27	at (6) Richmond; Semifinals	(1)	Fifth Third Field	**W** 8–3	**Zuercher (6–3)**	Jones (3–4)	—	33–19	2–0	
May 28	at (2) George Washington; Finals	(1)	Fifth Third Field	**W** 9–7	**Holmes (7–1)**	Pfau (4–4)	**Lefort (9)**	34–19	3–0	

NCAA tournament: Long Beach Regional (0–2)

Date	Opponent	Rank	Stadium	Score	Win	Loss	Save	Overall	Postseason	Sources
June 3	at No. 12 (1) Long Beach State; First round	(4)	Blair Field	**L** 2–11	Evans (1–2)	**Frederick (5–6)**	—	34–20	0–1	
June 4	at No. 18 (3) Pepperdine; First round elimination	(4)	Blair Field	**L** 1–2	Kleen (4–3)	**Venedam (2–3)**	–	34–21	0–2	

Legend: = Win = Loss = Tie = Canceled Bold = Rhode Island team member * Non-conference game • Schedule source • Rankings based on the teams' current ranking in the D1Baseball poll

== Stats ==
=== Batting ===
Note: G = Games played; AB = At bats; R = Runs; H = Hits; 2B = Doubles; 3B = Triples; HR = Home runs; RBI = Runs batted in; SB = Stolen bases; BB = Walks; AVG = Batting average; SLG = Slugging average

Player	G	AB	R	H	2B	3B	HR	RBI	SB	BB	AVG	SLG
Matt Sullivan	55	208	53	71	14	1	13	43	10	15	.341	.606
Scott Brown	54	204	46	68	15	0	3	43	15	23	.333	.451
Ryan Cunningham	53	200	32	73	12	2	7	45	3	10	.365	.550
Mike Rainville	54	195	38	57	9	2	3	36	6	20	.292	.405
Dave Savard	50	174	36	50	11	3	3	21	10	25	.287	.437
Wayne Russo	54	166	36	57	13	0	4	35	9	32	.343	.494
Daryl Holcomb	48	156	44	53	6	1	3	23	15	12	.340	.449
Josh Nestor	51	155	33	47	11	1	5	33	5	32	.303	.484
Joe Viscuso	51	145	20	33	3	2	1	14	6	9	.228	.297
CJ Simons	30	63	15	19	4	1	1	15	4	7	.302	.444
Chris Stelma	25	54	8	15	3	0	1	10	0	1	.278	.304
Zach Zaneski	21	38	5	7	1	0	2	4	0	1	.184	.368
Shaun Hagey	14	23	3	7	1	0	0	4	0	1	.304	.348
James Deady	6	9	1	2	0	0	0	0	0	0	.222	.222
Matthew Bruderek	2	1	1	0	0	0	1	0	0	1	1.000	1.000
Team totals	55	1791	370	560	103	13	46	327	83	189	.313	.462

=== Pitching ===
Note: W = Wins; L = Losses; ERA = Earned run average; G = Games pitched; GS = Games started; SV = Saves; IP = Innings pitched; H = Hits allowed; R = Runs allowed; ER = Earned runs allowed; BB = Walks allowed; SO = Strikeouts

Player	W	L	ERA	G	GS	SV	IP	H	R	ER	BB	SO
Zach Zuercher	6	3	3.05	14	14	0	91.1	73	34	31	34	103
Dan Frederick	5	6	5.38	14	14	0	77	79	49	46	32	68
Steve Holmes	7	1	4.34	12	11	0	74.2	72	40	36	18	77
Adam Perkins	9	3	3.03	22	9	0	68.1	69	34	23	12	62
Jim Norcott	3	3	3.18	14	6	1	45.1	43	20	16	16	29
Tom Venedam	2	3	2.56	22	0	1	31.2	27	13	9	7	25
Mike Lefort	2	0	2.01	19	0	9	22.1	20	5	5	6	22
Matthew Bruderek	0	0	3.09	11	0	0	11.2	10	5	4	4	9
Brett Palanski	0	1	4.82	5	1	0	9.1	5	7	5	3	6
Jamie Degidio	0	0	0.00	4	0	0	6.1	5	0	0	2	9
Dave Lipson	0	0	7.20	6	0	0	5	9	6	4	2	5
Gil Pena	0	1	15.43	6	0	0	4.2	8	9	8	3	2
Mike Harris	0	0	0.00	3	0	0	2.2	2	0	0	0	3
Mike Miranda	0	0	9.00	2	0	0	1	2	1	1	2	0
Team totals	34	21	3.75	154	55	11	451.1	424	223	188	141	420

== Offseason ==
=== 2005 MLB draft ===
Round	Pick	Player	Position	MLB Team
#9	#290	Zach Zuercher	LHP	St. Louis Cardinals

Third baseman Mike Rainville and right-handed pitcher Mick Lefort were both signed as undrafted free-agents after the draft, by the Tampa Bay Devil Rays and the Chicago Cubs respectively

=== Awards ===
Atlantic 10 Conference Weekly Awards
Player	Award	Date awarded	Ref.
Zach Zuercher	Pitcher of the Week	April 11, 2005	
Adam Perkins	Pitcher of the Week	April 18, 2005	
Matt Sullivan	Player of the Week	April 25, 2005	
Zach Zuercher	Pitcher of the Week	April 25, 2005	
Zach Zuercher	Pitcher of the Week	May 2, 2005	
Zach Zuercher	Pitcher of the Week	May 16, 2005	

All-A10
Player	Position	Team
Mike Rainville	3B	1
Ryan Cunningham	DH	1
Matt Sullivan	RF	1
Mick Lefort	CL	2
Josh Nestor	C	2
Wayne Russo	2B	2
Scott Brown	1B	2
