= Rhode Island Rams =

Intercollegiate sports teams of the University of Rhode Island

- University: University of Rhode Island
- Nickname: Rams
- NCAA: Division I (FCS)
- Conference: Atlantic 10 (primary); CAA Football (football)
- Athletic director: Patrick Lyons
- Location: Kingston, Rhode Island
- Varsity teams: 18 (8 men's, 10 women's)
- Football stadium: Meade Stadium; Centreville Bank Stadium (will be used in 2026)
- Basketball arena: Ryan Center
- Baseball stadium: Bill Beck Field
- Soccer stadium: URI Soccer Complex
- Other venues: Keaney Gymnasium
- Colors: Keaney blue, navy blue, and white
- Mascot: Rhody the Ram
- Fight song: "Rhode Island Born"
- Website: gorhody.com
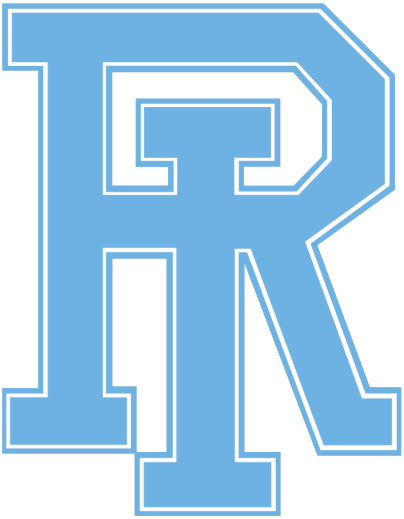

The Rhode Island Rams are the intercollegiate athletic programs that represent the University of Rhode Island, based in Kingston, Rhode Island, United States. The Rams compete in the NCAA's Division I as a member of the Atlantic 10 Conference. The football team, however, competes in the Coastal Athletic Association Football Conference of the NCAA's Football Championship Subdivision, as the A-10 does not sponsor football.

The program's interim athletic director is Brittney Miles, after Thorr Bjorn stepped down to join the UMass athletic department.

The school's colors are light blue (officially referred to as "Keaney blue"), white, and navy blue. The school's mascot is Rhody the Ram. It was chosen in 1923 as tribute to the school's agricultural history, making its first appearance in 1929. The school has not used a live ram since the introduction of "Rhody," a student in an anthropomorphic ram costume, in 1974.

== Sponsored sports ==
Men's sports	Women's sports
Baseball	Basketball
Basketball	Cross country
Cross country	Rowing
Football	Soccer
Golf	Softball
Soccer	Swimming & diving
Track & field^{†}	Tennis
	Track & field^{†}
	Volleyball
† – Track and field includes both indoor and outdoor.

As a primary member of the Atlantic 10 Conference, the University of Rhode Island sponsors teams in eight men's and ten women's NCAA sanctioned sports, with football competing in the Coastal Athletic Association Football Conference.

=== Baseball ===
Atlantic 10 Conference logo in Rhode Island colors

The Rams baseball program played its first season in 1898. It plays at Bill Beck Field on campus. In 2005, under head coach Frank Leoni, the program reached its first NCAA tournament. Under current head coach Raphael Cerrato, the Rams have made two NCAA tournaments, coming in 2016 and 2025.

=== Basketball ===
URI Basketball went to the NCAA tournament in 2017 after an 18 year drought, nearly upsetting Final Four participant #3 Oregon in the second round. In the 1990s, the Rams made the Big Dance in 1997, 1998, and 1999. In 1998, the Rams went on a surprise run to the Elite 8. Their current head coach is Archie Miller.

The women's team has made one NCAA appearance in 1996 after going 21–8 and 13–3 in A10 play, losing 90–82 to Oklahoma State. They have two other postseason appearances in the 2022 and 2023 WNITs. Their current head coach is Tammi Reiss.

=== Football ===
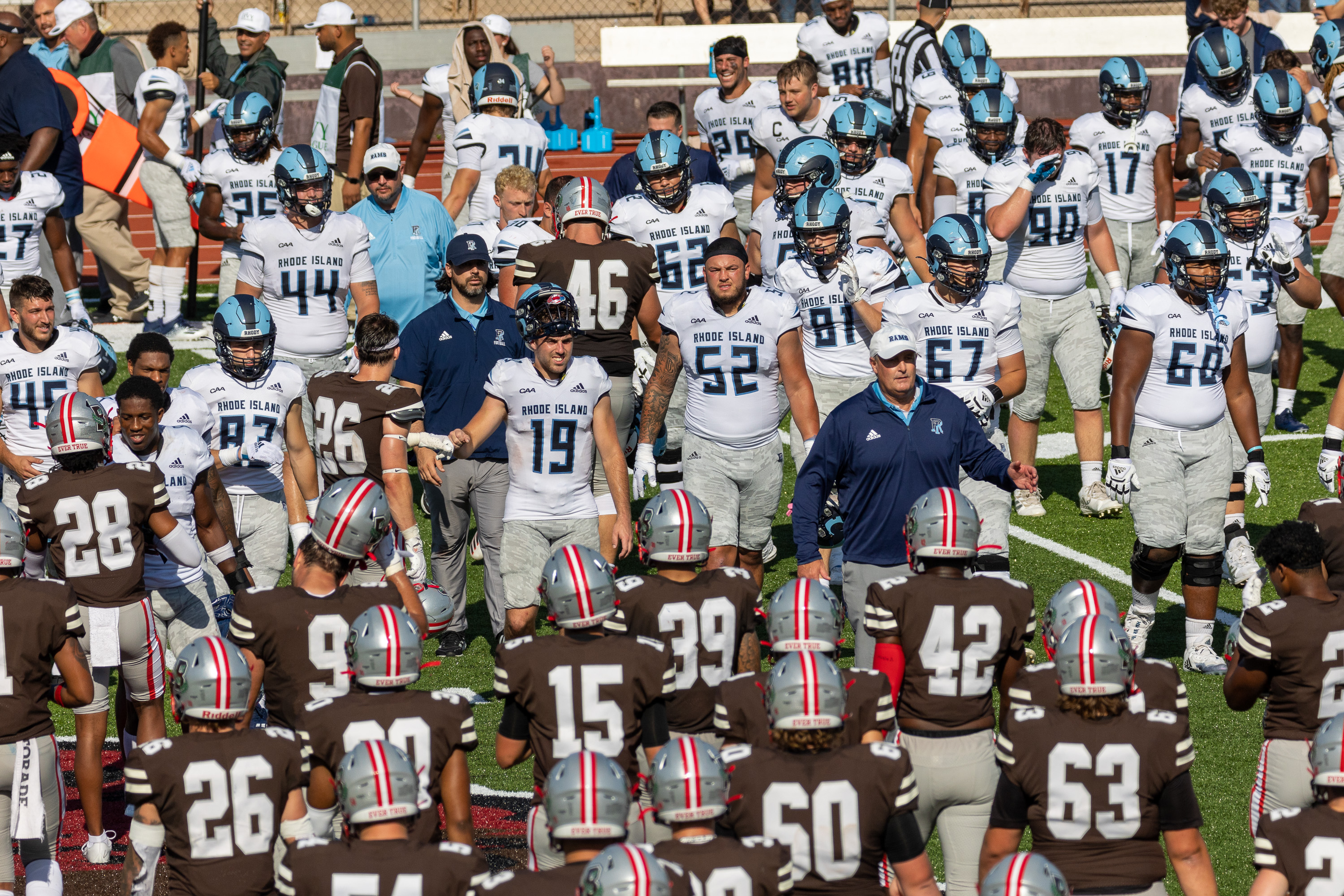
Coach Fleming and the Rams enter the field after the 2021 Governor's Cup game against Brown

The Rams have won eight conference championships, seven in the Yankee Conference and two in the Coastal Athletic Association. Likewise the Rams have won one division title, in 1995: the Yankee Conference's New England Division.

=== Softball ===
Rhode Island's softball team has appeared in one Women's College World Series in 1982.

== Club sports ==
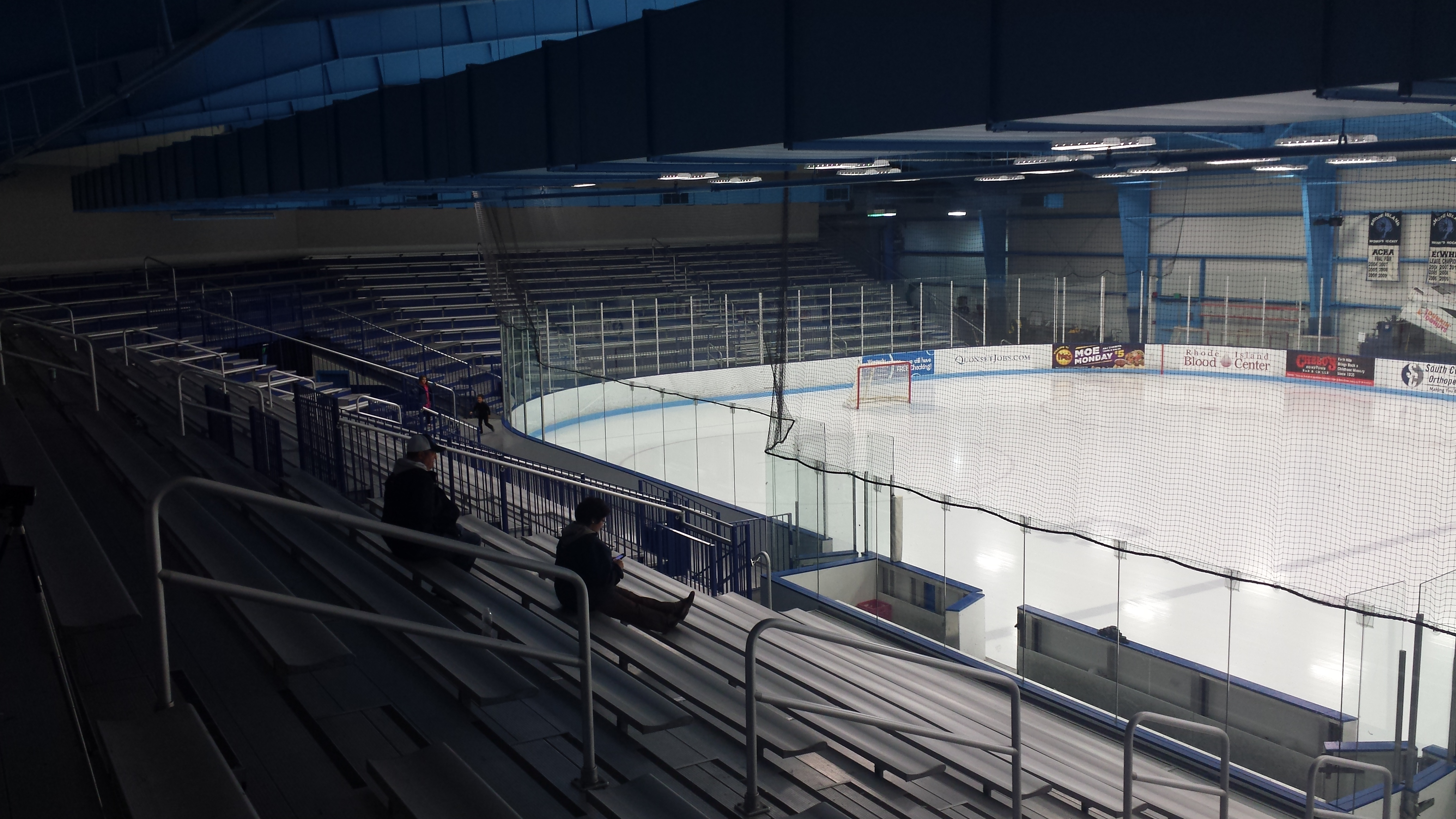
Brad Boss Arena, ice hockey rink

The University of Rhode Island Club Sports program consists of 13 teams. Each team is organized and managed by students with guidance from the Coordinator of Club Sports. They include Soccer, Tennis, Hockey, Field Hockey, Rowing, Sailing, Rugby, Swimming, Volleyball, Gymnastics, and Equestrian.

The women's ice hockey team competes in Division I of the American Collegiate Hockey Association in ECHA league.

== National championships ==
=== Team ===
Organizer	Division	Sport	Tournament	Year	Runner-up	Score
NCAA	University Division	Cross country	Division I tournament	1941	Penn State	83–110

== Facilities ==
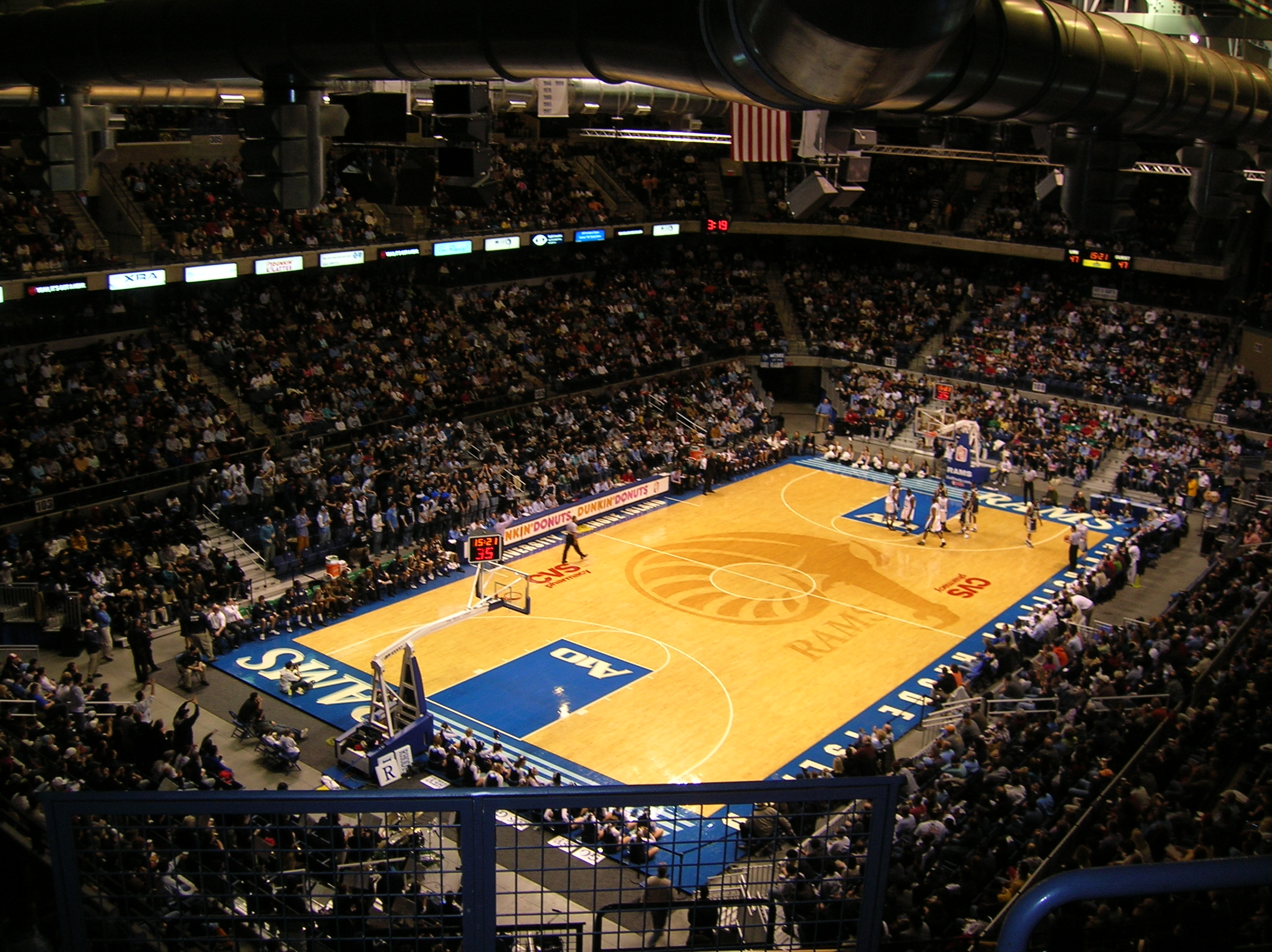
Ryan Center

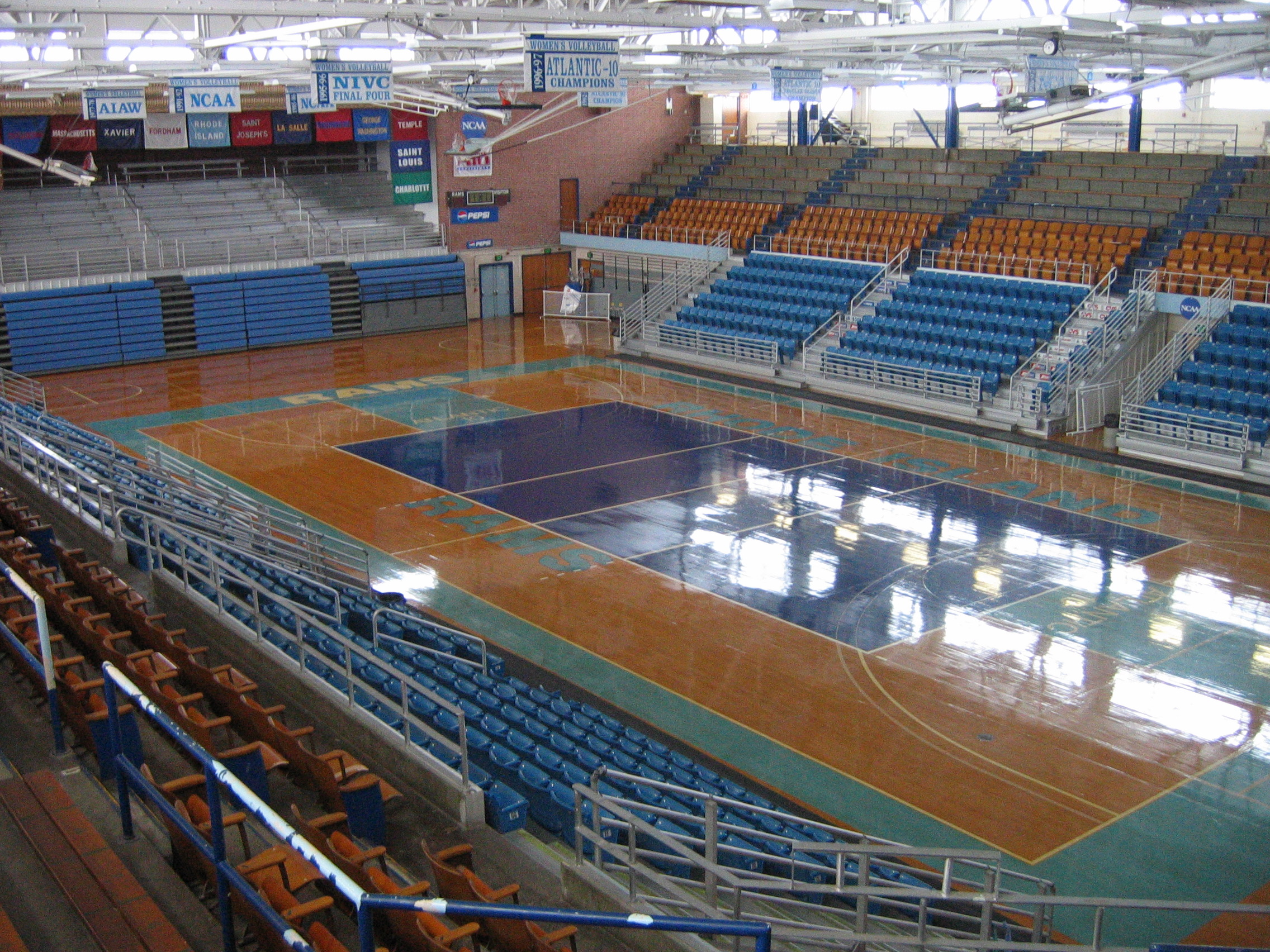
Keaney Gymnasium

Venue	Sport hosted
Bill Beck Field	Baseball
Ryan Center	Basketball
Meade Stadium	Football
URI Campanella Rowing Center	Rowing
URI Soccer Complex	Soccer
URI Softball Complex	Softball
Tootell Aquatics Center	Swimming & diving
URI Tennis Courts	Tennis
Mackal Fieldhouse	Indoor track and field
Keaney Gymnasium	Volleyball

== Mascot ==
Rhody the Ram is the official mascot of the University of Rhode Island. His mascot status was given on March 8, 1923, and he made his first appearance on November 21, 1929. At one time a real ram was housed at a dairy barn across from the campus, but that stopped in the 1960s, and was picked up for one year in 1974. Unlike other popular universities, the Rhody the Ram mascot program is run by the URI Student Alumni Association, a student run organization that serves the university by organizing many popular events on campus.

== Media coverage ==
=== Television ===
University of Rhode Island sports are televised regionally on the Ocean State Network, a joint venture of Cox Communications and WJAR. OSN provides television and streaming coverage of all regular season men's basketball games not broadcast on a national carrier, and select football, baseball, soccer and women's basketball games. Select men's basketball games are also covered by ESPN, and A-10 tournament games are televised by contract with ESPN, CBS and NBC. The University's ACHA men's ice hockey and women's basketball home games have live streaming video available on their respective websites.

=== Radio ===
Commercial coverage of men's basketball and football is provided by iHeartMedia stations WHJJ and WWBB in the Providence area, with rights managed by Learfield IMG College. The longtime announcer for both sports is Steve McDonald, who in 2011 was awarded the inaugural Ben Mondor Award for "extraordinary contributions in...sports in Rhode Island".

Non-commercial coverage of home games for football, baseball, men's (and select women's) basketball, as well as the school's ACHA men's ice hockey team can be heard on the University's student radio station WRIU. Other sports, including men's and women's soccer, softball, women's ice hockey and select women's basketball games are carried on WRIU's online station RIU2.

=== Controversial incidents ===
February 3, 1998 – Rhody the Ram tried to prevent the St. Joe's Hawk from his eternal flapping by putting an inner tube over its head, temporarily immobilizing his arms. While trying to remove the tube, the Hawk's head (costume) fell off. The incident was televised and repeated on ESPN.
