= List of Fordham Rams baseball seasons =

This is a list of Fordham baseball seasons. The Fordham Rams baseball team represents Fordham University and is a member of the Atlantic 10 Conference of the NCAA Division I. The team played its first game in 1859. No team was fielded in 1944 due to World War II.

The Rams are college baseball's winningest program, with 4,613 victories through the 2026 season. They have appeared in 8 NCAA Regionals and district playoffs and played in the second ever college baseball game, and the first to use the Knickerbocker Rules which evolved into modern baseball.

== Season Results ==
National champions	College World Series berth	NCAA Tournament berth	Conference Tournament Champions	Conference/Division Regular Season Champions

Season	Head coach	Conference	Season results									Tournament Results		Final Poll (Note: Collegiate Baseball began team rankings in 1959.)
Season	Head coach	Conference	Overall				Conference					Conference	Postseason (Note: Postseason play involving the NCAA Division I Baseball Championship began in 1947.)	CB
Season	Head coach	Conference	Wins	Losses	Ties	%	Wins	Losses	Ties	%	Finish (Members)	Conference	Postseason	CB
Fordham Rams
1859	None/Not available	Independent	1	0	0	1.000	N/A							
1860	None/Not available	Independent	40	7	0	.851	N/A							
1861	None/Not available	Independent	36	9	0	.800	N/A							
1862	None/Not available	Independent	38	11	0	.776	N/A							
1863	None/Not available	Independent	37	10	0	.787	N/A							
1864	None/Not available	Independent	35	11	0	.761	N/A							
1865	None/Not available	Independent	37	9	0	.804	N/A							
1866	None/Not available	Independent	34	10	0	.773	N/A							
1867	None/Not available	Independent	32	9	0	.780	N/A							
1868	None/Not available	Independent	34	8	0	.810	N/A							
1869	None/Not available	Independent	43	9	0	.827	N/A							
1870	Mike Cameron	Independent	35	9	0	.795	N/A							
1871	Mike Cameron	Independent	32	10	0	.762	N/A							
1872	None/Not available	Independent	30	10	0	.750	N/A							
1873	None/Not available	Independent	37	8	0	.822	N/A							
1874	None/Not available	Independent	39	2	0	.951	N/A							
1875	None/Not available	Independent	35	13	0	.729	N/A							
1876	None/Not available	Independent	36	10	0	.783	N/A							
1877	None/Not available	Independent	39	5	0	.886	N/A							
1878	None/Not available	Independent	38	6	0	.864	N/A							
1879	None/Not available	Independent	39	9	0	.813	N/A							
1880	None/Not available	Independent	37	8	0	.822	N/A							
1881	None/Not available	Independent	41	4	0	.911	N/A							
1882	None/Not available	Independent	43	16	0	.729	N/A							
1883	None/Not available	Independent	40	12	0	.769	N/A							
1884	None/Not available	Independent	48	9	0	.842	N/A							
1885	Neil Collins	Independent	47	9	0	.839	N/A							
1886	Jack Lynch	Independent	42	13	0	.764	N/A							
1887	Jack Lynch	Independent	44	12	1	.781	N/A							
1888	Jack Lynch	Independent	40	10	1	.794	N/A							
1889	Jack Lynch	Independent	40	23	1	.633	N/A							
1890	Jack Lynch	Independent	45	19	2	.605	N/A							
1891	Jack Lynch	Independent	44	20	2	.682	N/A							
1892	Harry Ely	Independent	45	13	2	.767	N/A							
1893	Harry Ely	Independent	49	18	0	.731	N/A							
1894	Dan Kiernan	Independent	43	23	1	.649	N/A							
1895	Dan Kiernan	Independent	41	16	1	.716	N/A							
1896	Dan Kiernan	Independent	39	15	0	.722	N/A							
1897	Dan Kiernan	Independent	40	33	0	.548	N/A							
1898	Jim Garry	Independent	45	25	0	.643	N/A							
1899	Jack Doyle	Independent	57	17	0	.770	N/A							
1900	Jack Doyle	Independent	41	14	0	.745	N/A							
1901	Fred L. Smith	Independent	41	10	0	.804	N/A							
1902	Fred L. Smith	Independent	40	16	0	.714	N/A							
1903	Fred L. Smith	Independent	43	13	0	.768	N/A							
1904	Fred L. Smith	Independent	48	13	0	.787	N/A							
1905	Fred L. Smith	Independent	41	14	0	.745	N/A							
1906	Gene Basford	Independent	41	22	0	.651	N/A							
1907	Bill Keane	Independent	40	17	0	.702	N/A							
1908	Gene Basford	Independent	46	9	0	.836	N/A							
1909	Jack Coffey	Independent	46	17	0	.730	N/A							
1910	Jack Coffey	Independent	48	9	0	.842	N/A							
1911	Jack Coffey	Independent	40	20	0	.667	N/A							
1912	Jack Coffey	Independent	35	24	0	.593	N/A							
1913	Jack Coffey	Independent	39	27	0	.591	N/A							
1914	Jack Coffey	Independent	39	24	2	.615	N/A							
1915	Jack Coffey	Independent	34	29	1	.539	N/A							
1916	Jack Coffey	Independent	41	17	1	.703	N/A							
1917	Jack Coffey	Independent	44	6	0	.880	N/A							
1918	Bill Keane	Independent	40	12	1	.764	N/A							
1919	Art Devlin	Independent	42	13	0	.764	N/A							
1920	Art Devlin	Independent	40	16	0	.714	N/A							
1921	Art Devlin	Independent	24	17	1	.583	N/A							
1922	Bill Keane	Independent	18	15	1	.544	N/A							
1923	Jack Coffey	Independent	14	17	0	.452	N/A							
1924	Jack Coffey	Independent	24	8	0	.750	N/A							
1925	Jack Coffey	Independent	27	9	0	.750	N/A							
1926	Jack Coffey	Independent	34	4	0	.895	N/A							
1927	Jack Coffey	Independent	24	8	0	.750	N/A							
1928	Jack Coffey	Independent	25	6	2	.788	N/A							
1929	Jack Coffey	Independent	20	6	0	.769	N/A							
1930	Jack Coffey	Independent	22	10	0	.688	N/A							
1931	Jack Coffey	Independent	24	8	0	.750	N/A							
1932	Jack Coffey	Independent	26	2	0	.929	N/A							
1933	Jack Coffey	Independent	25	6	0	.806	N/A							
1934	Jack Coffey	Metropolitan New York Conference	22	5	0	.815	Not Available						N/A	
1935	Jack Coffey	Metropolitan New York Conference	25	8	0	.758	Not Available						N/A	
1936	Jack Coffey	Metropolitan New York Conference	29	7	0	.806	Not Available						N/A	
1937	Jack Coffey	Metropolitan New York Conference	19	7	0	.731	Not Available						N/A	
1938	Jack Coffey	Metropolitan New York Conference	21	6	0	.778	Not Available						N/A	
1939	Jack Coffey	Metropolitan New York Conference	25	4	0	.862	Not Available						N/A	
1940	Jack Coffey	Metropolitan New York Conference	22	7	1	.750	Not Available						N/A	
1941	Jack Coffey	Metropolitan New York Conference	22	9	1	.703	Not Available						N/A	
1942	Jack Coffey	Metropolitan New York Conference	24	3	0	.889	Not Available						N/A	
1943	Jack Coffey	Metropolitan New York Conference	17	9	0	.654	Not Available						N/A	
1944	No team													
1945	Jack Coffey	Metropolitan New York Conference	14	10	0	.583	Not available						N/A	
1946	Jack Coffey	Metropolitan New York Conference	13	9	0	.591	Not available						N/A	
1947	Jack Coffey	Metropolitan New York Conference	16	14	1	.532	Not available						—	N/A
1948	Jack Coffey	Metropolitan New York Conference	17	14	0	.548	Not available						—	N/A
1949	Jack Coffey	Metropolitan New York Conference	14	16	0	.467	Not available						—	N/A
1950	Jack Coffey	Metropolitan New York Conference	22	9	1	.703	Not available							N/A
1951	Jack Coffey	Metropolitan New York Conference	15	12	0	.556	Not available						—	N/A
1952	Jack Coffey	Metropolitan New York Conference	19	9	1	.672	Not available						District II Playoffs	N/A
1953	Jack Coffey	Metropolitan New York Conference	17	7	0	.708	Not available						District II Playoffs	N/A
1954	Jack Coffey	Metropolitan New York Conference	19	8	0	.704	Not available						—	N/A
1955	Jack Coffey	Metropolitan New York Conference	18	5	0	.783	Not available						—	N/A
1956	Jack Coffey	Metropolitan New York Conference	15	8	0	.652	Not available						—	N/A
1957	Jack Coffey	Metropolitan New York Conference	17	6	0	.739	Not available						—	N/A
1958	Jack Coffey	Metropolitan New York Conference	14	8	0	.636	Not available						—	N/A
1959	Dan Rinaldo	Metropolitan New York Conference	14	12	0	.538	Not available						—	—
1960	Dan Rinaldo	Metropolitan New York Conference	17	15	1	.530	Not available						—	—
1961	Dan Rinaldo	Metropolitan New York Conference	15	14	1	.517	Not available						—	—
1962	Dan Rinaldo	Metropolitan New York Conference	24	7	0	.774	Not available						—	—
1963	Dan Rinaldo	Metropolitan New York Conference	18	10	0	.643	Not available						—	—
1964	Dan Rinaldo	Metropolitan New York Conference	18	10	3	.629	Not available						—	—
1965	Dan Rinaldo	Independent	18	17	0	.514	N/A						—	—
1966	Dan Rinaldo	Independent	18	16	1	.529	N/A						—	—
1967	Dan Rinaldo	Independent	8	14	0	.364	N/A						—	—
1968	Dan Rinaldo	Independent	11	14	2	.444	N/A						—	—
1969	Dan Rinaldo	Independent	9	12	2	.435	N/A						—	—
190	Gil McDougald	Independent	8	12	1	.405	N/A						—	—
1971	Gil McDougald	Independent	5	14	0	.263	N/A						—	—
1972	Gil McDougald	Independent	13	9	0	.591	N/A						—	—
1973	Gil McDougald	Independent	11	11	0	.500	N/A						—	—
1974	Gil McDougald	Metropolitan Intercollegiate Conference	12	12	0	.500	Not Available						—	—
1975	Gil McDougald	Metropolitan Intercollegiate Conference	21	11	0	.656	12	5	0	.706	Not Available		—	—
1976	Gil McDougald	Metropolitan Intercollegiate Conference	14	9	1	.604	10	5	1	.656	Not Available		—	—
1977	Jack Lyons	Metropolitan Intercollegiate Conference	14	12	0	.538	8	8	0	.500	Not Available		—	—
1978	Jack Lyons	Metropolitan Intercollegiate Conference	30	15	0	.667	12	4	0	.750	1st	ECAC Playoffs	—	—
1979	Jack Lyons	Metropolitan Intercollegiate Conference	18	13	0	.581	8	8	0	.500	Not Available		—	—
1980	Jack Lyons	Metropolitan Intercollegiate Conference	16	16	0	.500	Not Available						—	—
1981	Jack Lyons	Independent	13	18	1	.422	N/A						—	—
1982	Jack Lyons	Metro Atlantic Athletic Conference	11	19	0	.367	1	4	0	.200	Not Available	—	—	—
1983	Paul Blair	Metro Atlantic Athletic Conference	14	19	0	.609	3	2	0	.600	Not Available	—	—	—
1984	Dan Gallagher	Metro Atlantic Athletic Conference	6	29	1	.181	Not Available					—	—	—
1985	Dan Gallagher	Metro Atlantic Athletic Conference	15	23	1	.397	8	7	0	.533	Not Available	—	—	—
1986	Dan Gallagher	Metro Atlantic Athletic Conference	24	13	0	.649	11	4	0	.733	Not Available	—	—	—
1987	Dan Gallagher	Metro Atlantic Athletic Conference	33	13	0	.717	11	4	0	.733	1st	ECAC Playoff Champion	NCAA Regional	—
1988	Dan Gallagher	Metro Atlantic Athletic Conference	36	15	1	.702	13	2	0	.867	1st	ECAC Playoff Champion	NCAA Regional	—
1989	Dan Gallagher	Metro Atlantic Athletic Conference	15	23	2	.400	8	7	1	.531	Not Available	—	—	—
1990	Dan Gallagher	Metro Atlantic Athletic Conference	36	14	0	.720	16	2	0	.889	1st	ECAC Playoff Champion	NCAA Regional	—
1991	Dan Gallagher	Patriot League	35	16	0	.686	12	3	0	.800	1st	ECAC Playoff	—	—
1992	Dan Gallagher	Patriot League	29	15	0	.659	12	3	0	.800	1st	ECAC Playoff	—	—
1993	Dan Gallagher	Patriot League	32	27	0	.542	13	7	0	.650	1st North (4)	Champion	NCAA Regional	—
1994	Dan Gallagher	Patriot League	28	19	0	.596	17	3	0	.850	T-1st North (4)	Patriot League North playoff	—	—
1995	Dan Gallagher	Patriot League	30	20	0	.600	16	8	0	.667	2nd (7)	—	—	—
1996	Dan Gallagher	Atlantic 10 Conference	18	27	3	.406	8	11	1	.425	T-4th East (6)	—	—	—
1997	Dan Gallagher	Atlantic 10 Conference	34	19	0	.642	12	9	0	.571	2nd East (6)	A-10 Tournament	—	—
1998	Dan Gallagher	Atlantic 10 Conference	27	20	0	.574	10	8	0	.556	2nd East (6)	A-10 Tournament	NCAA Regional	—
1999	Dan Gallagher	Atlantic 10 Conference	22	28	0	.440	10	11	0	.476	T-3rd East (6)	—	—	—
2000	Dan Gallagher	Atlantic 10 Conference	21	29	0	.420	10	12	0	.455	6th East (6)	—	—	—
2001	Dan Gallagher	Atlantic 10 Conference	23	28	0	.451	10	12	0	.455	T-5th (11)	—	—	—
2002	Dan Gallagher	Atlantic 10 Conference	13	36	1	.270	6	18	0	.250	6th East (6)	—	—	—
2003	Dan Gallagher	Atlantic 10 Conference	16	27	0	.372	8	15	0	.348	6th East (6)	—	—	—
2004	Dan Gallagher	Atlantic 10 Conference	25	27	1	.481	13	11	0	.542	3rd East (6)	A-10 Tournament	—	—
2005	Nick Restaino	Atlantic 10 Conference	34	21	0	.618	17	7	0	.708	2nd East (6)	A-10 Tournament	—	—
2006	Nick Restaino	Atlantic 10 Conference	24	32	0	.429	13	14	0	.481	7th (14)	—	—	—
2007	Nick Restaino	Atlantic 10 Conference	35	22	0	.614	19	8	0	.704	2nd (14)	A-10 Runner-up	—	—
2008	Nick Restaino	Atlantic 10 Conference	29	24	1	.546	13	14	0	.481	T-7th (14)	—	—	—
2009	Nick Restaino	Atlantic 10 Conference	22	32	0	.407	16	11	0	.593	T-3rd (14)	A-10 Tournament	—	—
2010	Nick Restaino	Atlantic 10 Conference	21	35	0	.375	15	12	0	.556	T-4th (14)	A-10 Tournament	—	—
2011	Nick Restaino	Atlantic 10 Conference	31	23	1	.573	12	11	1	.521	8th (13)	—	—	—
2012	Kevin Leighton	Atlantic 10 Conference	22	34	0	.393	12	12	0	.500	7th (12)	—	—	—
2013	Kevin Leighton	Atlantic 10 Conference	22	33	0	.400	8	16	0	.333	12th (15)	—	—	—
2014	Kevin Leighton	Atlantic 10 Conference	24	30	0	.444	13	14	0	.481	7th (12)	A-10 Tournament	—	—
2015	Kevin Leighton	Atlantic 10 Conference	22	32	0	.407	13	11	0	.542	7th (13)	A-10 Tournament	—	—
2016	Kevin Leighton	Atlantic 10 Conference	29	29	0	.500	14	10	0	.583	5th (13)	A-10 Tournament	—	—
2017	Kevin Leighton	Atlantic 10 Conference	27	24	0	.529	11	12	0	.478	9th (13)	—	—	—
2018	Kevin Leighton	Atlantic 10 Conference	34	17	1	.663	16	8	0	.667	T-2nd (13)	A-10 Tournament	—	—
2019	Kevin Leighton	Atlantic 10 Conference	38	24	0	.613	15	9	0	.625	4th (13)	A-10 Champion	NCAA Regional	—
2020	Kevin Leighton	Atlantic 10 Conference	10	6	0	.625	Season canceled due to coronavirus pandemic							
2021	Kevin Leighton	Atlantic 10 Conference	24	19	0	.558	11	9	0	.550	4th North (6)	—	—	—
2022	Kevin Leighton	Atlantic 10 Conference	16	36	0	.308	9	15	0	.375	10th (12)	—	—	—
2023	Kevin Leighton	Atlantic 10 Conference	19	36	0	.345	7	17	0	.292	10th (12)	—	—	—
2024	Kevin Leighton	Atlantic 10 Conference	19	33	0	.365	10	14	0	.417	T-9th (12)	—	—	—
2025	Kevin Leighton	Atlantic 10 Conference	25	33	0	.431	15	15	0	.500	6th (12)	A-10 tournament	—	—
2026	Kevin Leighton	Atlantic 10 Conference	25	30	0	.455	15	15	0	.500	T-7th (12)	—	—	—
