= Larry Sudbrook =

American baseball coach

Larry Subrook
Biographical details
- Education: Kent State '78

Playing career
- 1975–1976: Lakeland

Coaching career (HC unless noted)
- 1981–1985: Fairport (OH) HS
- 1986–2021: St. Bonaventure

Head coaching record
- Overall: 724–817–10

Accomplishments and honors

Championships
- A-10 tournament: 2004

Awards
- A-10 Coach of the Year: 2000, 2006, 2017

Larry Sudbrook is an American former baseball coach and player. He served as the baseball coach at St. Bonaventure from 1986 through 2021 season. Under Sudbrook, the St. Bonaventure Bonnies complied as record of 724–814–10 and won or shared two Atlantic 10 Conference East Division titles and the 2004 Atlantic 10 Conference baseball tournament. He played college baseball at Lakeland Community College from 1975 to 1976.

== Coaching career ==
Sudbrook played two seasons at Lakewood Community College before completing his degree at Kent State University. He then coached Fairport Harding High School for five seasons, leading the Skippers to four sectional titles in his tenure. Since taking over the Bonnies, Sudbrook has coached 32 All-Conference players, 19 future pros, and 10 draft picks. St. Bonaventure claimed the 2004 Atlantic 10 Conference baseball tournament and a berth in the 2004 NCAA Division I baseball tournament. Sudbrook claimed his 600th victory on April 7, 2013. He is the Bonnies all-time leader in wins in any sport.

In a 2008 column, a writer for the New York Post wrote the following of Sudbrook:

St. Bonaventure is led by a good friend of ours, and easily the best quote in all of college athletics, Larry Sudbrook. Readers of this space likely have never heard of Larry, and will dismiss out-of-hand the best quote in all of college athletics line. However, anyone who ever has met Sudbrook will immediately agree with me – the man is a walking gold mine of classic quotes. On top of that, he is a hell of a baseball coach, as he recently picked up his 500th win.

While departing for a conference series against Charlotte, Sudbrook was detained after authorities found a firearm in his carry-on bag. He was fined and forfeited his weapon by the Buffalo court, and reprimanded by St. Bonaventure.

On October 4, 2021, Sudbrook announced his retirement from coaching at the end of the calendar year.

== Head coaching record ==
Below is a table of Sudbrook's yearly records as a collegiate head baseball coach.

Record table
Season	Team	Overall	Conference	Standing	Postseason
St. Bonaventure (Atlantic 10 Conference) (1986–2021)
1986	St. Bonaventure	13–26	2–9	4th (West)	
1987	St. Bonaventure	11–18	4–10	4th (West)	
1988	St. Bonaventure	26–21	7–9	4th (West)	
1989	St. Bonaventure	9–25	4–10	4th (West)	
1990	St. Bonaventure	22–19–1	7–9	3rd (West)	
1991	St. Bonaventure	28–14–3	7–9	4th (West)	
1992	St. Bonaventure	6–35 (Note: St. Bonaventure went 22–19 in 1992 but vacated 16 wins for using an ineligible player.)	1–15	4th (West)	
1993	St. Bonaventure	18–22–1	8–12	7th	
1994	St. Bonaventure	27–18	11–10	4th	A-10 tournament
1995	St. Bonaventure	22–23–1	12–9	3rd	A-10 tournament
1996	St. Bonaventure	19–19	10–10	3rd (East)	
1997	St. Bonaventure	19–26	9–12	T-3rd (East)	
1998	St. Bonaventure	21–21	8–10	T-3rd (East)	
1999	St. Bonaventure	24–22	10–11	T-3rd (East)	
2000	St. Bonaventure	26–16	13–8	1st (East)	A-10 tournament
2001	St. Bonaventure	26–19	12–10	5th	
2002	St. Bonaventure	30–13	16–7	1st (East)	A-10 tournament
2003	St. Bonaventure	22–19–1	9–11	3rd (East)	
2004	St. Bonaventure	29–22	14–7	2nd (East)	NCAA Regional
2005	St. Bonaventure	24–25	8–16	T-4th (East)	
2006	St. Bonaventure	26–19	18–8	2nd	A-10 tournament
2007	St. Bonaventure	25–27	14–12	6th	A-10 tournament
2008	St. Bonaventure	29–24	15–12	6th	A-10 tournament
2009	St. Bonaventure	24–25	9–17	T-11th	
2010	St. Bonaventure	17–31	8–19	14th	
2011	St. Bonaventure	23–23	13–11	T-5th	
2012	St. Bonaventure	23–25	10–14	8th	
2013	St. Bonaventure	20–28	9–15	11th	
2014	St. Bonaventure	12–30	6–17	12th	
2015	St. Bonaventure	16–28–2	3–21	13th	
2016	St. Bonaventure	26–22–1	11–13	T-8th	
2017	St. Bonaventure	26–22	15–8	3rd	A-10 tournament
2018	St. Bonaventure	10–33	6–15	11th	
2019	St. Bonaventure	13–32	6–18	11th	
2020	St. Bonaventure	5–1	0–0		Season canceled due to COVID-19
2021	St. Bonaventure	7–24	6–14	5th (North)	
St. Bonaventure:		724–817–10	321–418		
Total:		724–817–10			
National champion Postseason invitational champion Conference regular season champion Conference regular season and conference tournament champion Division regular season champion Division regular season and conference tournament champion Conference tournament champion

== See also ==
- List of current NCAA Division I baseball coaches
