= Loren Hibbs =

American baseball player and coach (born 1961)

- Loren Hibbs (49) meets with the umpires and opposing coach at a game in 2010.

Biographical details
- Born: May 17, 1961 (age 65); Wellington, Kansas, U.S.
- Education: Wichita State University

Playing career
- 1982–1984: Wichita State
- 1984: Everett Giants
- Position: Outfield

Coaching career (HC unless noted)
- 1985–1992: Wichita State (asst.)
- 1993–2019: Charlotte
- 2023: Wichita State (Interim HC)

Administrative career (AD unless noted)
- 2020-2022: Wichita State (Dir. of Operations)

Head coaching record
- Overall: 850–706–4
- Tournaments: NCAA: 3–10

Accomplishments and honors

Championships
- 2 Metro Conference Regular season Titles (1994, 1995); 4 Atlantic 10 Regular season Titles (2007, 2008, 2010, 2011); 1 Metro Conference Tournament championship (1993); 1 Conference USA Tournament championship (1998); 3 Atlantic 10 Tournament championships (2007, 2008, 2011); 5 NCAA Regional Appearances (1993, 1998, 2007, 2008, 2011)

Awards
- C-USA Coach of the Year (1998); A-10 Coach of the Year (2007); AAC Coach of the Year (2023)

Loren Hibbs (born May 17, 1961) is an American baseball coach and former player, most recently serving as the interim head baseball coach for Wichita State for the 2023 season. He previously has served as the head baseball coach at Charlotte.

== Playing career ==
Hibbs played college baseball for Wichita State. During his time as a player with the Shockers, he was on the all-tournament team at the 1982 College World Series and, in 1982, set the NCAA record for runs in a season. After college, Hibbs played a short time in the San Francisco Giants farm system, appearing in 39 games for the Everett Giants in 1984.

== Coaching career ==
Hibbs served as an assistant with Wichita State from 1985–1992 before being hired by the Charlotte 49ers. At Charlotte, Hibbs won the Metro Conference tournament and an NCAA tournament berth in 1993, the Metro regular season titles in 1994 and 1995, the Atlantic 10 regular season and conference tournament titles in 2007 and 2008, and the Atlantic 10 regular season title in 2010. In 1998 the Niners won a school-record 43 games and reached the NCAA tournament. Charlotte broke the 1998 mark for wins in 2007 with 49 wins, including two wins over NC State in the 2007 NCAA tournament.

On June 14, 2019, Hibbs announced his retirement as head coach of Charlotte baseball to rejoin Wichita State as its director of baseball operations. In December 2022, he was named interim head coach after the resignation of Eric Wedge. Despite taking the reins just months before the 2023 season, he was named the American Athletic Conference coach of the year after leading the Shockers to a 30-25 (13-10 AAC) record, an improvement of a 21-36 overall mark and 9-15 finish in league play in 2022.

On May 30, 2023, Wichita State director of athletics Kevin Saal announced that Hibbs and the rest of the Shockers coaching staff would not be retained for the 2024 season, with the university opting to perform a national search for Wedge's permanent replacement. In 2025, Hibbs was announced as the new head coach of the Cotuit Kettleers, a collegiate summer baseball team in the Cape Cod Baseball League.

=== Head coaching record ===
Below is a table of Hibbs's yearly records as an NCAA head baseball coach.

Record table
Season	Team	Overall	Conference	Standing	Postseason
Charlotte 49ers (Metro Conference) (1993–1995)
1993	Charlotte	26–32	6–11	5th	NCAA Regional
1994	Charlotte	31–25	12–5	1st	Metro Tournament
1995	Charlotte	36–21	11–7	T–1st	Metro Tournament
Charlotte 49ers (Conference USA) (1996–2005)
1996	Charlotte	29–30	11–13	5th	C-USA tournament
1997	Charlotte	30–26–1	14–12	5th	C-USA tournament
1998	Charlotte	43–19	19–8	3rd	NCAA Regional
1999	Charlotte	26–26	13–14	7th	C-USA tournament
2000	Charlotte	32–25–1	15–11	4th	C-USA tournament
2001	Charlotte	24–31	10–17	8th	C-USA tournament
2002	Charlotte	19–35	9–21	11th	
2003	Charlotte	21–28	11–15	8th	C-USA tournament
2004	Charlotte	20–32	9–21	10th	
2005	Charlotte	32–23	13–17	9th	
Charlotte 49ers (Atlantic 10 Conference) (2006–2013)
2006	Charlotte	35–20–1	18–9	T–3rd	A-10 tournament
2007	Charlotte	49–12	23–4	1st	NCAA Regional
2008	Charlotte	43–16	19–8	T–1st	NCAA Regional
2009	Charlotte	33–22	16–11	T–4th	A-10 tournament
2010	Charlotte	40–16	20–7	1st	A-10 tournament
2011	Charlotte	43–16	17–7	1st	NCAA Regional
2012	Charlotte	21–32	9–14	10th	
2013	Charlotte	37–23	17–7	T–1st	A-10 tournament
Charlotte 49ers (Conference USA) (2013–2019)
2014	Charlotte	19–31–1	10–19	T–11th	
2015	Charlotte	19–29	11–19	10th	
2016	Charlotte	23–32	12–17	8th	C-USA tournament
2017	Charlotte	34–24	18–12	T-3rd	C-USA tournament
2018	Charlotte	34–24	17–13	4th	C-USA tournament
2019	Charlotte	21–31–1	11–18–1	11th	
Wichita State Shockers (American Athletic Conference) (2023)
2023	Wichita State	30–25	13–10	3rd	American tournament
Total:		850–706–5			
National champion Postseason invitational champion Conference regular season champion Conference regular season and conference tournament champion Division regular season champion Division regular season and conference tournament champion Conference tournament champion

== Personal ==
Hibbs's wife, Lisa, is the director of the Athletic Academic Center at UNC Charlotte. His son Tyson Hibbs played for his father as a utility player and pinch runner with the 49ers. He is also the father of two daughters, Erin and Lanie.
