= Patrick Lyons (athletic director) =

American college athletics administrator

Current position
- Title: Athletic director
- Team: Rhode Island
- Conference: A-10

Biographical details
- Born: c. 1975

Playing career

Ice hockey
- 1995–1996: Iona

Coaching career (HC unless noted)

Golf
- 1998–2002: Iona

Administrative career (AD unless noted)
- 2005–2011: Iona
- 2011–2019: Seton Hall
- 2026–present: Rhode Island

Patrick G. Lyons (born c. 1975) is an American college athletics administrator. He is the athletic director at the University of Rhode Island, a position he has held since 2026. Lyons served as the athletic director at Iona College from 2005 to 2011 and Seton Hall University from 2011 to 2019.

A native of Providence, Rhode Island, Lyons attended Iona, where he played for the men's ice hockey and golf teams. He led all NCAA Division I players in goals per game during the 1995–96 hockey season, was captain of the golf team, and received the Joseph O'Connell award as the school's outstanding student athlete. He was the athletic director at Iona from 2005 to 2011 and also coached the golf team from 1998 to 2002.
