= 2008 Atlantic 10 Conference baseball tournament =

American college baseball tournament

- Teams: 6
- Format: Six-team double elimination First-round byes for top two seeds
- Finals site: Campbell's Field; Camden, NJ
- Champions: Charlotte (2nd title)
- Winning coach: Loren Hibbs (2nd title)
- MVP: Rob Lyerly (Charlotte)

The 2008 Atlantic 10 Conference Baseball Championship was held from May 21 through 24 at Campbell's Field in Camden, New Jersey. It featured the top six regular-season finishers of the conference's 14 teams. Second-seeded Charlotte defeated Xavier in the title game to win the tournament for the second straight year, earning the A-10's automatic bid to the 2008 NCAA tournament.

== Seeding and format ==
The league's top six teams, based on winning percentage in the 27-game regular-season schedule, were seeded one through six. The top two seeds, Xavier and Charlotte, received byes into the second round of play in the double elimination tournament.

In the tie for first place, the conference's tiebreaking procedures gave Xavier the top seed.

| Team | W | L | Pct. | GB | Seed |
|---|---|---|---|---|---|
| Xavier | 19 | 8 | .704 | – | 1 |
| Charlotte | 19 | 8 | .704 | – | 2 |
| Duquesne | 16 | 10 | .615 | 2.5 | 3 |
| Temple | 16 | 11 | .593 | 3 | 4 |
| Rhode Island | 15 | 11 | .574 | 3.5 | 5 |
| St. Bonaventure | 15 | 12 | .556 | 4 | 6 |
| Dayton | 13 | 14 | .481 | 6 | – |
| Fordham | 13 | 14 | .481 | 6 | – |
| George Washington | 11 | 16 | .407 | 8 | – |
| La Salle | 11 | 16 | .407 | 8 | – |
| Massachusetts | 11 | 16 | .407 | 8 | – |
| Richmond | 10 | 16 | .389 | 8.5 | – |
| Saint Louis | 9 | 17 | .346 | 9.5 | – |
| Saint Joseph's | 9 | 18 | .333 | 10 | – |

== Bracket ==
Upper round 1
5 | Rhode Island | 7
4 | Temple | 1
6 | St. Bonaventure | 6
3 | Duquesne | 16
Lower round 1
4 | Temple | 5
6 | St. Bonaventure | 2
3 | Duquesne | 10
4 | Temple | 7

Upper round 2
1 | Xavier | 4
5 | Rhode Island | 11
2 | Charlotte | 13
3 | Duquesne | 7
Lower round 2
1 | Xavier | 9
3 | Duquesne | 5

Upper final
5 | Rhode Island | 1
2 | Charlotte | 11
Lower final
5 | Rhode Island | 0
1 | Xavier | 3

Final
2 | Charlotte | 4^{11}
1 | Xavier | 3

== All-Tournament Team ==
The following players were named to the All-Tournament Team. Charlotte's Rob Lyerly, one of four 49ers selected, was named Most Outstanding Player.

Duquesne's Bill Torre (2005) was a second-time selection.

| Pos. | Name | Team |
|---|---|---|
| 1B | Alex Burt | Charlotte |
| IF | Jordan Conley | Xavier |
| P | Mike Creevy | Xavier |
| IF | Rob Lyerly | Charlotte |
| C | Derek Mechling | Duquesne |
| P | Mike Mongiardini | Temple |
| OF | Stan Orzechowski | Temple |
| P | Brett Palanski | Rhode Island |
| P | Danny Rosenbaum | Xavier |
| P | Luke Stahl | Charlotte |
| OF | O'Brien Taylor | Charlotte |
| IF | Bill Torre | Duquesne |

== Notes ==
- This was Duquesne's final appearance in the tournament as the baseball program folded in 2010 due to budget cuts.
