= 2006 Atlantic 10 Conference baseball tournament =

American college baseball tournament

- Teams: 6
- Format: Six-team double elimination First-round byes for top two seeds
- Finals site: Jim Houlihan Park at Jack Coffey Field; Bronx, NY
- Champions: Saint Louis (1st title)
- Winning coach: Bob Hughes (1st title)
- MVP: Ryan Bird (Saint Louis)

The 2006 Atlantic 10 Conference Baseball Championship was held from May 24 through 28 at Jim Houlihan Park at Jack Coffey Field in The Bronx, NY. It featured the top six regular-season finishers of the conference's 14 teams. Fifth-seeded Saint Louis defeated St. Bonaventure in the title game to win the tournament for the first time, earning the Atlantic 10's automatic bid to the 2006 NCAA tournament.

== Seeding and format ==
The league's top six teams, based on winning percentage in the 27-game regular-season schedule, were seeded one through six. The top two seeds, Rhode Island and St. Bonaventure, received byes into the second round of play in the double elimination tournament.

Team	W	L	Pct.	GB	Seed
Rhode Island	19	6	.760	–	1
St. Bonaventure	18	8	.692	1.5	2
Dayton (Note: In the tie for third place, Dayton's regular-season series sweep of Charlotte gave them the third seed.)	18	9	.667	2	3
Charlotte	18	9	.667	2	4
Saint Louis	15	12	.556	5	5
George Washington	13	12	.520	6	6
Fordham	13	14	.481	7	–
La Salle	12	14	.462	7.5	–
Duquesne	12	15	.444	8	–
Richmond	12	15	.444	8	–
Massachusetts	11	16	.407	9	–
Saint Joseph's	9	18	.333	11	–
Xavier	9	18	.333	11	–
Temple	6	19	.240	13	–

== Bracket ==
Upper round 1
5	Saint Louis	3
4	Charlotte	1
6	George Washington	0
3	Dayton	2
Lower round 1
4	Charlotte	1
6	George Washington	3
3	Dayton	1
6	George Washington	6

Upper round 2
1	Rhode Island	2
5	Saint Louis	3
2	St. Bonaventure	4
3	Dayton	3
Lower round 2
1	Rhode Island	5
6	George Washington	6^{17}

Upper final
5	Saint Louis	10
2	St. Bonaventure	5
Lower final
2	St. Bonaventure	9
6	George Washington	2

Final
5	Saint Louis	2
2	St. Bonaventure	3

== All-Tournament Team ==
The following players were named to the All-Tournament Team. Saint Louis pitcher Ryan Bird, one of two Billikens selected, was named Most Outstanding Player.

George Washington's Josh Wilkie (2005) and St. Bonaventure's Joe Rizzo (2004) were second-time selections.

Pos.	Name	Team
C	Andrew Abokhair	George Washington
RP	Matt Agostinelli	St. Bonaventure
P	Ryan Bird	Saint Louis
P	Derek Haese	George Washington
OF	Charlie Kruer	George Washington
OF	Randy Moley	St. Bonaventure
C	Bill Musselman	Saint Louis
P	Dan Pfau	George Washington
OF	Joe Rizzo	St. Bonaventure
P	Luke Trubee	Dayton
P	Josh Wilkie	George Washington
P	John Zinnicker	St. Bonaventure

== Notes ==
- The George Washington-Rhode Island 17 inning game was the longest in tournament history
