= Bill Beck (coach) =

American football and baseball coach

Biographical details
- Born: January 3, 1900; Everett, Massachusetts, U.S.
- Died: March 5, 1965 (aged 65); Burlington, Vermont, U.S.

Coaching career (HC unless noted)

Football
- 1941: Rhode Island State
- 1946–1949: Rhode Island State

Baseball
- 1954–1959: Rhode Island

Head coaching record
- Overall: 12–22–2 (football); 40–56–1 (baseball)

Accomplishments and honors

Championships
- Football; 1 New England Conference (1941)

William M. H. Beck (January 3, 1900 – March 5, 1965) was an American college football and baseball coach at the University of Rhode Island. He served as the head coach of the Rhode Island Rams football team in 1941 and then again from 1946 through 1949, compiling a record of 12–22–2. Beck also coached the Rhode Island baseball program from 1954 to 1959, tallying a mark of 40–56–1. In 1966, the school honored Beck by naming its newly constructed baseball stadium Bill Beck Field.

Beck died on March 5, 1965, at Mary Fletcher Hospital in Burlington, Vermont, after sustaining injuries in a skiing accident.

== Head coaching record ==
=== Football ===
Year	Team	Overall	Conference	Standing	Bowl/playoffs
Rhode Island State Rams (New England Conference) (1941)
1941	Rhode Island State	5–2–1	2–0	1st	
Rhode Island State Rams (Independent) (1946)
1946	Rhode Island State	2–4	1–2	3rd	
Rhode Island State Rams (Yankee Conference) (1947–1949)
1947	Rhode Island State	3–4	1–3	4th	
1948	Rhode Island State	2–4–1	1–3	4th	
1949	Rhode Island State	0–8	0–4	4th	
Rhode Island State:		12–22–2	5–12		
Total:		12–22–2			
National championship Conference title Conference division title or championship game berth

=== Baseball ===
Record table
Season	Team	Overall	Conference	Standing	Postseason
Rhode Island Rams (Yankee Conference) (1954–1959)
1954	Rhode Island	4–12			
1955	Rhode Island	10–8			
1956	Rhode Island	10–7			
1957	Rhode Island	7–9–1			
1958	Rhode Island	7–9			
1959	Rhode Island	2–11			
Total:		40–56–1			
