= 1859 Fordham Rose Hill Baseball Club team =

Played in the first Knickerbocker Rules college baseball game

1859 Fordham Rose Hill baseball
- Conference: Independent
- Record: 1–0

The 1859 Fordham Rose Hill Baseball Club team played in the first college baseball game under Knickerbocker Rules in the 1859 college baseball season. The team was composed of students at Fordham University's St. John's College. In the game played November 3, 1859, they beat St. Francis Xavier 33–11.

== Schedule ==
1859 Fordham Rose Hill Baseball Club Game Log

Regular season
Date	Opponent	Site/stadium	Score	Overall record
Nov 3	St. Francis Xavier	New York, NY	W 33–11	1–0
