= Frank Keaney =

American coach (1886–1967)

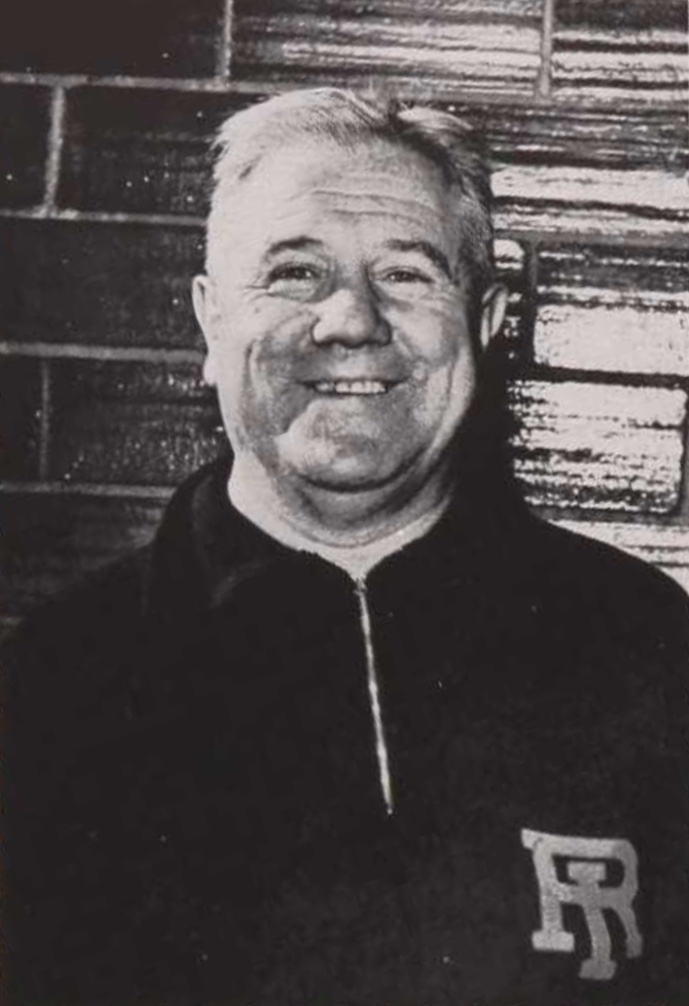
- Keaney from the 1943 Grist

Biographical details
- Born: June 5, 1886; Boston, Massachusetts, U.S.
- Died: October 10, 1967 (aged 81); Wakefield, Rhode Island, U.S.

Playing career

Football
- c. 1910: Bates

Baseball
- c. 1910: Bates

Coaching career (HC unless noted)

Basketball
- 1920–1948: Rhode Island State

Football
- 1917–1919: Everett HS (MA)
- 1920–1940: Rhode Island State

Baseball
- 1921–1948: Rhode Island State

Administrative career (AD unless noted)
- 1920–1956: Rhode Island State / Rhode Island

Head coaching record
- Overall: 401–124 (college basketball); 70–86–12 (college football); 222–113–1 (college baseball)

Accomplishments and honors

Championships
- Football; 3 New England (1931, 1933, 1938); Basketball; 16 New England (1924, 1929–1931, 1933–1935, 1937–1943, 1945, 1946)
- Basketball Hall of Fame; Inducted in 1960 (profile)
- College Basketball Hall of Fame; Inducted in 2006

Frank William "Menty" Keaney (June 5, 1886 – October 10, 1967) was an American football, basketball, and baseball coach and college athletics administrator. As a college men's basketball coach, he was known as the architect of modern "run-and-shoot" basketball and the inventor of the fast break.

Keaney was a native of Boston, Massachusetts, and attended Cambridge Latin School, graduating in 1906. He graduated from Bates College, where he played several sports, in 1911. He was the head football coach at Everett High School in Massachusetts from 1917 to 1919. He coached at Rhode Island State College (now the University of Rhode Island) from 1920 to 1948 and taught a style of basketball using a fast-breaking offense and a full-court defense. In his 28 years at Rhode Island, Keaney's basketball Rams won eight conference championships and had only one losing season. In 1939, Keaney's Rams became the first college team to score more than 50 points per game, and in 1943 the team had an average of more than two points per minute (80.7 points per game), which led to the Rams being dubbed "The Firehouse Gang". During his tenure the URI team had four National Invitation Tournament appearances. Keaney's career record with the men's basketball team was 401–124 (.764).

After retiring from coaching collegiate basketball, Keaney was offered the position of head coach of the Boston Celtics. Keaney's doctor, however, refused to let him take the job. He was also offered the head coach position for what was intended to be the rivaling Providence Steamrollers in the Basketball Association of America as well (being the first head coach option in Providence alongside Boston), but Keaney declined both teams' offers in relation to his doctor's orders. He remained at URI as athletic director until 1959. The university named the Frank W. Keaney Gymnasium-Armory in his honor in 1953. Keaney was inducted into the Basketball Hall of Fame in 1960.

== Head coaching record ==
=== College football ===
Year	Team	Overall	Conference	Standing	Bowl/playoffs
Rhode Island State (Athletic League of New England State Colleges) (1920–1922)
1920	Rhode Island State	0–4–4	0–0–2		
1921	Rhode Island State	3–5	2–0		
1922	Rhode Island State	4–4	1–0		
Rhode Island State Rams (New England Conference) (1923–1940)
1923	Rhode Island State	1–5–1	0–3	4th	
1924	Rhode Island State	0–7	0–3	5th	
1925	Rhode Island State	2–5–1	0–1–1	4th	
1926	Rhode Island State	1–6	0–3	5th	
1927	Rhode Island State	5–3	2–1	2nd	
1928	Rhode Island State	2–7	0–3	4th	
1929	Rhode Island State	5–2–1	1–1	2nd	
1930	Rhode Island State	5–2–1	0–1–1	3rd	
1931	Rhode Island State	4–4	2–0	T–1st	
1932	Rhode Island State	2–5–1	0–1–1	3rd	
1933	Rhode Island State	6–2	2–0	1st	
1934	Rhode Island State	6–3	2–1	2nd	
1935	Rhode Island State	4–4–1	1–1	2nd	
1936	Rhode Island State	5–4	1–2	3rd	
1937	Rhode Island State	3–4–1	0–2–1	4th	
1938	Rhode Island State	4–4	2–0	1st	
1939	Rhode Island State	3–4–1	1–2	4th	
1940	Rhode Island State	5–3	2–1	2nd	
Rhode Island State:		70–86–12	19–26–6		
Total:		70–86–12			
National championship Conference title Conference division title or championship game berth

=== College basketball ===
Record table
Season	Team	Overall	Conference	Standing	Postseason
Rhode Island State Rams (Independent) (1920–1923)
1920–21	Rhode Island State	9–8			
1921–22	Rhode Island State	7–8			
1922–23	Rhode Island State	9–4			
Rhode Island State / Rhode Island State Rams (New England Conference) (1923–1946)
1923–24	Rhode Island State	9–6	2–1	T-1st	
1924–25	Rhode Island State	11–5			
1925–26	Rhode Island State	8–8			
1926–27	Rhode Island State	13–3			
1927–28	Rhode Island State	15–5			
1928–29	Rhode Island State	15–1	4–1	1st	
1929–30	Rhode Island State	10–5	3–1	1st	
1930–31	Rhode Island State	13–4	3–1	1st	
1931–32	Rhode Island State	13–3			
1932–33	Rhode Island State	14–4	4–0	1st	
1933–34	Rhode Island State	13–3	4–0	1st	
1934–35	Rhode Island State	12–6	4–1	1st	
1935–36	Rhode Island State	13–5			
1936–37	Rhode Island State	18–3	8–0	1st	
1937–38	Rhode Island State	19–2	8–0	1st	
1938–39	Rhode Island State	17–4	7–1	1st	
1939–40	Rhode Island State	19–3	8–0	1st	
1940–41	Rhode Island State	21–4	7–1	T-1st	NIT Quarterfinals
1941–42	Rhode Island State	18–4	8–0	1st	NIT Quarterfinals
1942–43	Rhode Island State	16–3	7–1	1st	
1943–44	Rhode Island State	14–6			
1944–45	Rhode Island State	20–5	5–1	1st	NIT Semifinals
1945–46	Rhode Island State	21–3	4–0	1st	NIT runner-up
Rhode Island State Rams (Yankee Conference) (1946–1948)
1946–47	Rhode Island State	17–3			
1947–48	Rhode Island State	17–6			
Rhode Island State:		401–124 (.764)	86–9 (.905)		
Total:		401–124 (.764)			
National champion Postseason invitational champion Conference regular season champion Conference regular season and conference tournament champion Division regular season champion Division regular season and conference tournament champion Conference tournament champion
