= Frank Leoni =

American baseball coach (born 1968)

Current position
- Title: Head coach
- Team: Mount St. Mary's
- Conference: MAAC
- Record: 106–149–1 (.416)

Biographical details
- Born: November 28, 1968 (age 57); Providence, Rhode Island, U.S.

Playing career
- 1988–1991: Rhode Island
- Position: Shortstop

Coaching career (HC unless noted)
- 1993–2005: Rhode Island
- 2006–2012: William & Mary
- 2014–2021: Marymount
- 2022–present: Mount St. Mary's

Head coaching record
- Overall: 702–808–6 (.465)

Accomplishments and honors

Championships
- 1 Atlantic 10 Conference Tournament championship (2005); 2 Atlantic 10 Regular season Championships (2004, 2005); 3 Atlantic 10 Conference East Division Championships (2003, 2004, 2005) 1 Atlantic East Conference Regular season and Tournament championship (2021)

Awards
- New England (NEIBA) DI Coach of the Year (2004); Atlantic 10 Coach of the Year (2003, 2004); Rhode Island Baseball Coaches Association Hall of Fame Inductee (2010); Futures Collegiate Baseball League Manager of the Year (2015); CAC Coach of the Year (2016); ECAC South Region Coach of the Year (2016); AEC Coaching Staff of the Year (2021)

Frank Leoni (born November 28, 1968) is an American baseball coach, currently the head baseball coach of the Mount St. Mary's Mountaineers. He played college baseball at Rhode Island from 1988 to 1991. He then served as head coach at William & Mary Tribe (2006–2012), the Rhode Island Rams (1993–2005) and the Marymount Saints (2014–2021).

In 2005 under Leoni, Rhode Island qualified for its first NCAA tournament.

== Playing career ==
Leoni attended Cranston High School East in Cranston, Rhode Island, where he played high school baseball for the Thunderbolts from 1984 to 1986. He also attended the University of Rhode Island in Kingston, Rhode Island, where he was the starting shortstop for the Rams from 1988 to 1991 and held six school records. In 1991, Leoni was named Atlantic 10 Academic All-Conference and to the Division I All-New England squad.

== Coaching career ==
=== Rhode Island ===
Leoni was named the youngest NCAA DI head baseball coach in September, 1992 when he was hired to pilot the Rams at the age of 23. At the time, the program was a perennial bottom feeder in the Atlantic 10 Conference and slated for Title IX elimination. After a successful campaign to save the program, all athletic scholarship funding was stripped prior to the 1993–1994 academic year, leading to a dismal 2-39-1 record. Over the next 11 years, with less than 2.5 full scholarships and no full-time assistant coaches, the Rams were transformed into a conference and regional powerhouse. The Rams won the Atlantic 10 Conference Eastern Division Championship for three consecutive years (2003–2005), the Atlantic 10 Conference Regular season Championship for two consecutive years (2004–2005), and won its first ever Atlantic 10 Conference Tournament championship and secured its first ever bid to the NCAA DI baseball tournament (2005). Leoni was named Atlantic 10 Conference Coach of the Year in 2003 and 2004, as well as New England DI Coach of the Year in 2004. At the conclusion of the 2005 season, the Rams were named Team of the Year by Words Unlimited. At the end of his tenure, Leoni was the winningest coach in program history. From 2003 to 2005, the program went 54–18 in Atlantic 10 Conference play. Over 13 seasons at URI, Leoni recruited or coached 18 players that went on to professional baseball, including 10 Major League Baseball draft picks (four top ten round picks), 10 All-Americans, three A-10 Pitchers of the Year, one A-10 Player of the Year and one A-10 Rookie of the Year. He accepted the Head Baseball Coach position at the College of William & Mary in August 2005.

=== William & Mary ===
Late in August 2005, Leoni began his tenure at the College of William & Mary, replacing former Major Leaguer Jim Farr. The program had experienced recent hardship. Most notably, the roster had experienced significant turnover, with less than a full complement of players remaining. Quickly, the Tribe were restored as a perennial contender in the Colonial Athletic Association. On March 18, 2007, Leoni earned his 300th coaching victory after a 15–8 win over Towson. In 2007, Tribe had the Colonial Athletic Association co-Player of the Year. In 2008, the program finished with the second most wins (36) in its history and had a school record four Major League Baseball draft picks. The 2008 team also finished 3rd in NCAA DI team batting average. On April 7, 2009, Leoni became the fastest to reach 100 wins in program history, defeating Liberty 2–1. On April 20, 2010, the Tribe defeated Longwood 10–9, securing Leoni's 400th coaching victory. Leoni was inducted into the Rhode Island Baseball Coaches Association Hall of Fame in 2010, receiving the Ben Mondor Award for lifetime service. From 2010 to 2011, the Colonial Athletic Association reduced the championship field size to four teams, when the Tribe narrowly missed the playoffs. Seven Colonial Athletic Association series victories became the school record in 2011. In 2012, the team won 31 games, and had the Colonial Athletic Association Pitcher of the Year for the second consecutive season. Over seven seasons at W&M, Leoni recruited or coached 18 players who signed professional contracts, including 12 Major League Baseball draft picks (three top ten round picks), 17 All-Americans, one VaSID Player of the Year, two CAA Pitchers of the Year and two CAA Players of the Year. In May 2012, Leoni resigned to pursue other professional opportunities.

=== Marymount ===
On October 1, 2012, Leoni was hired by Marymount as its inaugural Head Baseball Coach. The Marymount Saints had 24 freshman and six transfers when it began varsity competition in the Capital Athletic Conference during the 2014 season. In its second season, the Saints finished 4th and qualified for the postseason in 2015. After beginning the 2016 season with seven consecutive conference victories, Marymount finished in 2nd place and made it to the conference semi-finals. On March 21, 2016, Leoni registered his 500th career victory with a 14–11 win over St. Mary's. For the team's efforts in 2016, Leoni was named Capital Athletic Conference and ECAC South Region Coach of the Year and the Saints were named NOVA Baseball Magazine Collegiate Team of the Year. For the third time in four years of existence, the Saints made it to the postseason in 2017, and defeated national power Christopher Newport in the first round for the second consecutive year. In 2018–19, Marymount became a founding member of the Atlantic East Conference. After finishing tied for 2nd place, the Saints finished 2019 in the semi-finals. COVID-19 prematurely ended the Saints 2020 season. At the time, they were off to the best start in program history with a 13-6-1 record. In 2021, the Saints broke through with their first Atlantic East Conference Regular season and Tournament championship. Marymount reached the NCAA DIII High Point Regional Tournament, a first in program history. For their efforts, Alex Lemery was named Co-Player of the Year, Ryan Bergenhagen was named Pitcher of the Year, and Leoni and his staff were named Coaching Staff of the Year in the Atlantic East Conference. Over seven and one half seasons, Leoni has recruited and coached one Conference Player of the Year, one Conference Pitcher of the Year, three ABCA All-Region, two D3Baseball All-Region, one VaSID Player of the Year, seven VaSID All-State, and 17 All-Conference honorees. The Saints have also earned five consecutive ABCA Team Academic Excellence Awards through 2019–20.

=== Mount St. Mary's ===
On June 22, 2021, Leoni was named the head baseball coach of the Mount St. Mary's Mountaineers. The program has enjoyed a resurgence during Leoni's tenure. The Mount has won 22 or more games in four straight seasons (2023–26) for the first time in program history. Leoni also won his 100th game at the Mount in 2026, becoming the fastest to win 100 games at Mount St. Mary's. In 2023, the team won the second most games in program history (25) after beginning the season on a five-game winning streak, a school record. Then, in 2024, the Mountaineers advanced to the Metro Atlantic Athletic Conference tournament with a fourth-place finish, its first postseason appearance since 2018. The team reached the semifinals after beating Canisius and #1 seed Fairfield. In 2023–2024, the team had back-to-back 20+ win seasons for the first time since 2009–2010. The Mount has had seven All-Conference players and the MAAC Rookie of the Year, players recruited and/or developed by Leoni and his staff. The program has also set more than 12 team school records, as well as more than 12 individual school records,

=== Martha's Vineyard Sharks ===
During the summer of 2015, Leoni was the field manager (head coach) for the Martha's Vineyard Sharks of the Futures Collegiate Baseball League. After guiding the team to a first-place finish, Leoni was named co-Manager of the Year. Five Sharks players, who played for Leoni, were Major League Baseball draft picks.

== Head coaching record ==
Below is a table of Leoni's yearly records as a collegiate head baseball coach.

Record table
Season	Team	Overall	Conference	Standing	Postseason
Rhode Island Rams (Atlantic 10 Conference) (1993–2005)
1993	Rhode Island	12–26	5–14	8th	
1994	Rhode Island	2–39–1	1–22	9th	
1995	Rhode Island	12–31	5–16	9th	
1996	Rhode Island	15–24	6–14	6th (East)	
1997	Rhode Island	14–28–1	6–15	5th (East)	
1998	Rhode Island	19–24	8–10	t-3rd (East)	
1999	Rhode Island	22–28	10–11	t-3rd (East)	
2000	Rhode Island	24–25–1	8–13	t-4th (East)	
2001	Rhode Island	27–23	10–12	t-5th	
2002	Rhode Island	24–28	10–14	t-3rd (East)	
2003	Rhode Island	26–26	16–8	t-1st (East)	A-10 tournament
2004	Rhode Island	35–20–1	20–4	1st (East)	A-10 tournament
2005	Rhode Island	34–21	18–6	1st (East)	A-10 Champions, NCAA Long Beach Regional
Rhode Island:		266–343–4 (.437)	123–159–0 (.436)		
William & Mary Tribe (Colonial Athletic Association) (2006–2012)
2006	William & Mary	23–29	11–19	t-9th	
2007	William & Mary	29–25	13–16	7th	
2008	William & Mary	36–21	16–13	4th	CAA Tournament
2009	William & Mary	24–25	9–14	9th	
2010	William & Mary	27–24	10–14	t-8th	
2011	William & Mary	26–29	16–14	t-5th	
2012	William & Mary	31–25	12–18	9th	
William & Mary:		196–178–0 (.524)	87–108–0 (.446)		
Marymount Saints (Capital Athletic Conference) (2014–2018)
2014	Marymount	8–26	2–14	T-8th	
2015	Marymount	17–17	9–9	4th	CAC Tournament
2016	Marymount	23–17	12–6	T-2nd	CAC Tournament
2017	Marymount	20–21	9–9	T-4th	CAC Tournament
2018	Marymount	13–23	5–13	8th	
Marymount:		––0 (–)	37–51–0 (.420)		
Marymount Saints (Atlantic East Conference) (2019–2021)
2019	Marymount	20–21	8–4	T-2nd	AEC Tournament
2020	Marymount	13–6–1	0–0		Season canceled due to COVID-19
2021	Marymount	20–7	15–3	1st	NCAA Regional
Marymount:		134–138–1 (.493)	23–7–0 (.767)		
Mount St. Mary's Mountaineers (Northeast Conference) (2022)
2022	Mount St. Mary's	14–34	7–20	8th	
Mount St. Mary's:		––0 (–)	7–20–0 (.259)		
Mount St. Mary's Mountaineers (Metro Atlantic Athletic Conference) (2023–present)
2023	Mount St. Mary's	25–27	10–14	T-7th	
2024	Mount St. Mary's	22-34-1	13-11	4th	MAAC semifinals
2025	Mount St. Mary's	23-28	15-13	6th	MAAC Tournament
2026	Mount St. Mary's	22–26	13–17	10th	
Mount St. Mary's:		106–149–1 (.416)	51–55–0 (.481)		
Total:		702–808–6 (.465)			
National champion Postseason invitational champion Conference regular season champion Conference regular season and conference tournament champion Division regular season champion Division regular season and conference tournament champion Conference tournament champion
