= Rhode Island Rams baseball =

American college baseball team

- 2026 Rhode Island Rams baseball team
- Founded: 1898
- University: University of Rhode Island
- Head coach: Raphael Cerrato (12th season)
- Conference: A-10
- Location: Kingston, RI
- Home stadium: Bill Beck Field (Capacity: 1,000)
- Nickname: Rams
- Colors: Keaney blue, navy blue, and white

NCAA tournament appearances
- 2005, 2016, 2025

Conference tournament champions
- 2005, 2016, 2025

Conference regular season champions
- A-10: 2006, 2013, 2016, 2025; A-10 East: 2003, 2004, 2005

The Rhode Island Rams baseball team is the varsity intercollegiate baseball team of the University of Rhode Island, located in Kingston, Rhode Island, United States. The program has been a member of the NCAA Division I Atlantic 10 Conference since the start of the 1981 season. Since the 1966 season, the program has played at Bill Beck Field, located on the university's campus. The program has appeared in two NCAA tournaments. It has won two conference tournaments, three regular season conference titles, and three regular season division titles. Three former Rams have appeared in Major League Baseball.

== History ==
=== Early years ===
The university first held classes in 1892, as the Rhode Island College of Agriculture and Mechanic Arts. Its varsity baseball program began playing in 1898, going 6–2 in its first season. The program played two more seasons before going on hiatus from 1901 to 1906. It returned in 1907. In 1909, the school was renamed Rhode Island State College. After taking one season off in 1918, due to World War I, the program resumed play for the 1919 season.

Prior to the start of the 1921 season, Frank Keaney was named the program's head coach. In the preceding fall, Keaney had also been named the college's head football and men's basketball coach.

On March 8, 1923, the Ram was adopted as the official mascot and nickname of the college's athletic programs.

=== New England Conference ===
Prior to the start of the 1924 season, the New England Conference formed. In addition to Rhode Island State, the conference's members were Connecticut, Maine, New Hampshire, and Northeastern. It sponsored baseball from its inception.

The program played 22 seasons in the conference (1924–1943, 1946–1947), all under Keaney. During this period, in which the program had a 194–92–1 overall record, the program's highest win total came in 1937 (16–4), and its highest winning percentage came in 1933 (.923).

=== Yankee Conference ===
Prior to the start of the 1948 season, the Rams joined the Yankee Conference. The conference formed has a result of Northeastern's departure from the New England Conference. It consisted of the four remaining NEC members, along with Massachusetts State and Vermont.

Frank Keaney retired as head baseball coach following the 1948 season. In 26 seasons as head coach, Keaney had a record of 222–113–1. He also stepped down as the school's men's basketball coach at this time, in order to become Rhode Island State's athletic director. Shortly thereafter, in 1951, the name of the school was changed from Rhode Island State College to the University of Rhode Island.

The program struggled during its time in the Yankee Conference. After going 14–3 in 1949, its first season under Vic Palladino, the program had an above-.500 record in only six of 31 seasons. Two of these seasons, 1955 and 1956, came under head coach Bill Beck, who would step down following the 1959 season. In 1966, the program's home venue was dedicated to Beck.

Following the 1975 season, the Yankee Conference stopped sponsoring sports other than football. Rhode Island competed as a Division I Independent from 1976 to 1980.

=== Atlantic 10 Conference ===
Prior to the 1981 season, the program joined the recently formed Eastern 8 Conference, playing in the East Division along with Rutgers and Massachusetts. Following the 1982 season, with several changes to the conference's membership, the conference became known by its current name, the Atlantic 10 Conference (A-10). Rhode Island made the transition under head coach John Norris, who had held the position since prior to the 1970 season. In 1984, Norris led the program to its first postseason appearance, a berth in the Atlantic 10 tournament. The Rams qualified for the tournament by finishing tied for 2nd in the East Division. In the four-team, double-elimination tournament, Rhode Island won its opening two games, 15–3 over West Virginia and 7–6 over Penn State. The team then could have won the tournament and advanced to the NCAA tournament with a win over Temple, which had already lost one game. However, Temple defeated the Rams in consecutive games, 6–3 and 6–4. For the remainder of Norris' tenure, which lasted through the 1987 season, and the entirety of Dave Morris' tenure (1988–1992), the Rams finished no higher than third in the East Division and did not qualify for the postseason.

Following the 1992 season, the university hired program alumnus Frank Leoni as head coach at a time when it considered cutting the baseball program. The program survived, although for a time, its scholarship funding was cut entirely to comply with Title IX. At the time, Leoni was the youngest coach in Division I baseball. His early seasons as head coach were poor. In 1994, his second season, the team had its worst season in the Atlantic 10 era, going 2–39–1 with a 1–22 A-10 record amid reduced funding and talk of cutting the program. In the late-1990s, after the school decided to keep the program the team improved. In 1998 and 1999, the team finished tied for 3rd in the East Division. In 2001, it finished with an above-.500 record for the first time since 1984, going 27–23.

In 2003, the program finished tied for 1st in the East Division and returned the postseason for the first time since 1984. In the A-10 tournament, the Rams went 1–2. In 2004, the program won the East Division outright and returned to the A-10 tournament. After losing its opening game to St. Bonaventure, the team defeated George Washington and Richmond to advance to the championship game against St. Bonaventure. There, it lost 3–2.

In 2005, the Rams won the East Division and the A-10 tournament in order to advance to the program's first NCAA tournament. In the conference tournament, the Rams went 3–0, defeating Dayton, Richmond, and George Washington to receive the A-10's automatic bid to the 2005 NCAA tournament. As the fourth seed in the Long Beach Regional, the team lost its opening game to Long Beach State, 11–2. It then lost an elimination game to Pepperdine, 2–1.

Following the 2005 season, Leoni left Rhode Island to become the head coach at William & Mary. He was replaced by Jim Foster, a former Providence player and minor-league catcher who had been an assistant at Brown from 2002 to 2004 and at Rhode Island in 2005. In Foster's first season, 2006, the Rams won the A-10 Regular season Title. In the A-10 Tournament, the team was eliminated after consecutive one-run losses: 3–2 against Saint Louis and 6–5 in 17 innings against George Washington. In 2009, the team set a program-record with 37 wins and finished second in the A-10. After losing to Xavier in the deciding game of the A-10 Tournament, the team was considered for an at-large bid to the NCAA tournament, but did not receive one.

During an October 2011 fall workout, Rhode Island player Joseph Ciancola collapsed on the playing field and died in a hospital shortly thereafter. During the following season, Ciancola was commemorated by both Rhode Island and his former high school team.

In the 2013 season, the team finished in a three-way tie for the regular season A-10 championship. Rhode Island, Saint Louis, and Charlotte each finished with 17–7 conference records. In the opening round of the A-10 tournament, the Rams defeated La Salle, 5–2, behind a complete game by Mike Bradstreet. It then lost consecutive games to Charlotte and George Washington, however, and was eliminated from the tournament.

Following the 2014 season, Foster left to become the associate head coach at Boston College. In nine years as the Rams' head coach, Foster had an overall record of 268–228–2; he won two A-10 regular season championships and had seven 30-win seasons. Assistant coach Raphael Cerrato, formerly the head coach at Division II New Haven, was named interim head coach for the 2015 season.

=== Conference affiliations ===
- Independent (1898–1900, 1907–1917, 1919–1923)
- New England Conference (1924–1943, 1946–1947)
- Yankee Conference (1948–1975)
- Independent (1976–1980)
- Atlantic 10 Conference (1981–present)
  - Known as the Eastern 8 Conference from 1981 to 1982

== Rhode Island in the NCAA Tournament ==
Year	Record	Pct	Notes
2005	0–2	.000	Long Beach Regional
2016	1–2	.333	Columbia Regional
2025	0–2	.000	Baton Rouge Regional
TOTALS	1–6	.143	

== Venues ==
=== Bill Beck Field ===
Since the start of the 1966 season, the Rams have played on campus at Bill Beck Field. The field has a capacity of 1,000 spectators and has been renovated twice since 2000. It is named for Bill Beck, former Rhode Island football and baseball coach. The site of the field has hosted Rhode Island baseball since its first season in 1898.

== Broadcasts ==
Home games for Rhode Island baseball and softball are carried by the University of Rhode Island's radio station, WRIU. Many baseball home games (and nearby away games) are broadcast on 90.3FM, with the remaining baseball and all home softball games streamed online on RIU2.

== Head coaches ==
Frank Keaney is the program's longest-tenured head coach, having coached for 26 seasons in two stints, 1921–1943, 1946–1948. Raphael Cerrato, coach from 2015, is the program's wins leader with 272.

Year(s)	Coach	Seasons	W-L-T	Pct
1898–1900, 1907–1917, 1919–1920	Unknown	16	64–65–1	.492
1921–1943, 1946–1948	Frank Keaney	26	222–113–1	.622
1949–1953	Victor J Palladino Jr.	5	41–40–1	.506
1954–1959	Bill Beck	6	40–56–1	.417
1960–1961	John Chironna	2	16–15–1	.516
1962	Pete Stark	1	5–12–1	.295
1963–1968	Bob Butler	6	33–72–2	.314
1969	Brit Piez	1	5–13	.278
1970–1987	John Norris	18	208–267–4	.438
1988–1992	Dave Morris	5	59–128–3	.315
1993–2005	Frank Leoni	13	266–343–4	.437
2006–2014	Jim Foster	9	268–228–2	.542
2015–present	Raphael Cerrato	11	272–275–2	.497
TOTALS	12	119	1499-1628-24	.480

== Yearly record ==
Statistics overview
Season	Coach	Overall	Conference	Standing	Postseason
Independent (1898–1900)
1898	Unknown	6–2			
1899	Unknown	3–1			
1900	Unknown	4–2			
No program (1901–1906)
Independent (1907–1917)
1907	Unknown	9–3			
1908	Unknown	3–4			
1909	Unknown	3–3–1			
1910	Unknown	2–5			
1911	Unknown	3–5			
1912	Unknown	2–7			
1913	Unknown	2–6			
1914	Unknown	2–6			
1915	Unknown	7–2			
1916	Unknown	3–4			
1917	Unknown	5–2			
No program (1918–1918)
Independent (1919–1923)
1919	Unknown	6–8			
1920	Unknown	4–5			
1921	Frank Keaney	4–6			
1922	Frank Keaney	9–5			
1923	Frank Keaney	7–5			
Independent:		84–81–1			
New England Conference (1924–1943)
1924	Frank Keaney	6–5			
1925	Frank Keaney	5–8			
1926	Frank Keaney	7–7–1			
1927	Frank Keaney	9–4			
1928	Frank Keaney	11–1			
1929	Frank Keaney	8–6			
1930	Frank Keaney	11–3			
1931	Frank Keaney	10–3			
1932	Frank Keaney	11–1			
1933	Frank Keaney	12–1			
1934	Frank Keaney	9–5			
1935	Frank Keaney	10–3			
1936	Frank Keaney	10–6			
1937	Frank Keaney	16–4			
1938	Frank Keaney	9–9			
1939	Frank Keaney	12–3			
1940	Frank Keaney	7–6			
1941	Frank Keaney	11–3			
1942	Frank Keaney	6–7			
1943	Frank Keaney	7–3			
No program (1944–1945)
New England Conference (1946–1947)
1946	Frank Keaney	1–3			
1947	Frank Keaney	6–1			
NEC:		194–92–1			
Yankee Conference (1948–1980)
1948	Frank Keaney	8–5			
1949	Vic Palladino	14–3			
1950	Vic Palladino	9–7			
1951	Vic Palladino	7–9–1			
1952	Vic Palladino	6–10			
1953	Vic Palladino	5–11			
1954	Bill Beck	4–12			
1955	Bill Beck	10–8			
1956	Bill Beck	10–7			
1957	Bill Beck	7–9–1			
1958	Bill Beck	7–9			
1959	Bill Beck	2–11			
1960	John Chironna	8–6–1			
1961	John Chironna	8–9			
1962	Pete Stark	5–12–1			
1963	Bob Butler	5–8			
1964	Bob Butler	5–13			
1965	Bob Butler	3–15			
1966	Bob Butler	6–11			
1967	Bob Butler	4–13–1			
1968	Bob Butler	10–12–1			
1969	Brit Piez	5–13			
1970	John Norris	9–6			
1971	John Norris	6–12			
1972	John Norris	7–11			
1973	John Norris	6–14			
1974	John Norris	8–9			
1975	John Norris	7–14–2			
Yankee:		204–279–8			
Independent (1976–1980)
1976	John Norris	9–13			
1977	John Norris	11–13			
1978	John Norris	13–17			
1979	John Norris	12–15			
1980	John Norris	15–13			
Independent:		60–71			
Atlantic 10 Conference (1981–present)
1981	John Norris	14–18	3–5	3rd (East)	
1982	John Norris	17–19	3–4	3rd (East)	
1983	John Norris	15–22	3–7	4th (East)	
1984	John Norris	22–18	6–5	t-2nd (East)	A-10 Tournament
1985	John Norris	14–16–1	5–7	4th (East)	
1986	John Norris	14–15–1	4–7–1	3rd (East)	
1987	John Norris	9–22	4–10	4th (East)	
1988	Dave Morris	10–28	5–11	4th (East)	
1989	Dave Morris	15–25	5–10	3rd (East)	
1990	Dave Morris	11–23–2	6–10	3rd (East)	
1991	Dave Morris	15–27	4–12	5th (East)	
1992	Dave Morris	8–25–1	4–12	5th (East)	
1993	Frank Leoni	12–26	5–14	8th	
1994	Frank Leoni	2–39–1	1–22	9th	
1995	Frank Leoni	12–31	5–16	9th	
1996	Frank Leoni	15–24	6–14	6th (East)	
1997	Frank Leoni	14–28–1	6–15	5th (East)	
1998	Frank Leoni	19–24	8–10	t-3rd (East)	
1999	Frank Leoni	22–28	10–11	t-3rd (East)	
2000	Frank Leoni	24–25–1	8–13	t-4th (East)	
2001	Frank Leoni	27–23	10–12	t-5th	
2002	Frank Leoni	24–28	10–14	t-3rd (East)	
2003	Frank Leoni	26–26	16–8	t-1st (East)	A-10 tournament
2004	Frank Leoni	35–20–1	20–4	1st (East)	A-10 tournament
2005	Frank Leoni	34–21	18–6	1st (East)	NCAA Regional
2006	Jim Foster	35–14	19–6	1st	A-10 tournament
2007	Jim Foster	23–29	16–11	5th	A-10 tournament
2008	Jim Foster	31–27–1	15–11	5th	A-10 tournament
2009	Jim Foster	37–20–1	19–6	2nd	A-10 tournament
2010	Jim Foster	31–26	17–10	3rd	A-10 tournament
2011	Jim Foster	31–22	16–8	2nd	A-10 tournament
2012	Jim Foster	33–25–1	16–8	3rd	A-10 tournament
2013	Jim Foster	34–25	17–7	t-1st	A-10 tournament
2014	Jim Foster	13–40	7–18	12th	
2015	Raphael Cerrato	26–25–1	15–9	t-2nd	A-10 tournament
2016	Raphael Cerrato	31–27	18–6	1st	NCAA Regional
2017	Raphael Cerrato	31–22	17–6	2nd	A-10 tournament
2018	Raphael Cerrato	24–27	13–11	t-7th	
2019	Raphael Cerrato	24–29	14–9	6th	A-10 tournament
2020	Raphael Cerrato	8–5	0–0		
2021	Raphael Cerrato	28–26–1	14–6	1st (North)	A-10 tournament
2022	Raphael Cerrato	20–35	14–10	4th	A-10 tournament
2023	Raphael Cerrato	23–29	13–11	7th	A-10 tournament
2024	Raphael Cerrato	19–28	11–13	8th	
2025	Raphael Cerrato	38–22	22–8	1st	NCAA Regional
A-10:		971–1104–14	468–433–1		
Total:		1499-1628-24			
National champion Postseason invitational champion Conference regular season champion Conference regular season and conference tournament champion Division regular season champion Division regular season and conference tournament champion Conference tournament champion

== Notable former players ==
The following is a list of notable former Rams.

- Angelo Dagres
- Nick Greenwood
- Chet Jaworski
- Frank Leoni
- Kyle Regnault
- Dave Stenhouse

== Major League Baseball draft ==
Between 2012 and 2014, the program had one MLB draft selection in each season. In 2012, P Chris Pickering was drafted in the 32nd round by the San Francisco Giants; in 2013, outfielder Jeff Roy was taken by the Pittsburgh Pirates in the 18th round; and in 2014, pitcher Ty Sterner was selected by the Cincinnati Reds in the 23rd round.

A record four Rams were selected in 2009. 14th-round selection Nick Greenwood appeared in the major leagues with the St. Louis Cardinals in 2014.
