= 1859 college baseball season =

- Duration: July 1 – November 3, 1859
- Number of games: 2
- Number of teams: 4

Seasons
- 1860 →

The 1859 college baseball season was the first season of intercollegiate baseball in the United States. The competing systems of rules known as Massachusetts Rules and Knickerbocker Rules were both used in different parts of the country. The season consisted of only four teams and two games, with each game featuring one of the competing systems of rules. No champion for college baseball was determined until 1893, and it would not be until 1947 that the College World Series began.

== Programs ==
While many institutions had baseball teams, only three colleges fielded intercollegiate teams in 1860, with one game involving a preparatory school. The collegiate teams were:

- Amherst
- St. John's College Fordham Rose Hill
- Williams

== First game ==
The first game between teams composed completely of players enrolled at separate colleges was held on July 1, 1859, between Amherst College and Williams in Pittsfield, Massachusetts. The game was held using Massachusetts rules, and Amherst won 73–32. The game was loosely similar to modern baseball, with no foul territory, no called strikes, and only one out per inning. Despite the score, the game took just three and a half hours to play.

== Second game ==
The first game to be held using Knickerbocker Rules, largely used today, was held on November 3, 1859, between the St. John's College Fordham Rose Hill Baseball Club (known today as Fordham University) and St. Francis Xavier. St. John's won 33–11.
