= Raphael Cerrato =

American college baseball coach and player

Current position
- Title: Head coach
- Team: Rhode Island
- Conference: Atlantic 10
- Record: 298–305–2 (.494)

Biographical details
- Born: May 20, 1971 (age 55)

Playing career
- 1990–1993: Rhode Island

Coaching career (HC unless noted)
- 1997: Rhode Island (asst)
- 1998–2000: Massachusetts (asst)
- 2001–2005: Brown (asst)
- 2006: New Haven (AHC)
- 2007–2011: New Haven
- 2012–2014: Rhode Island (asst)
- 2015–present: Rhode Island

Head coaching record
- Overall: 429–402–2 (.516)
- Tournaments: NE10: 2–5; A10: 12–11; NCAA: 1–4

Accomplishments and honors

Championships
- 2 A-10 tournament (2016, 2025); 2 A-10 (2016, 2025); A-10 North (2021)

Awards
- Second Team All-A-10 (1991); 3× A-10 Coach of the Year (2015, 2016, 2025)

Raphael Cerrato (born May 20, 1971) is an American college baseball coach and former player. Cerrato is the head coach of the Rhode Island Rams baseball team.

== Coaching career ==
Cerrato returned to the University of Rhode Island as a volunteer assistant in 1997. From 1998 to 2000, Cerrato was an assistant at the UMass Minutemen baseball program. Following his stint at UMass, Cerrato became the top assistant for the Brown Bears baseball team. In 2006, he became the top assistant for the University of New Haven, only to be promoted to head coach the next year. Cerrato lead the Chargers to a 131–97 record in 5 seasons as the head coach.

In 2012, he returned to Rhode Island to become an assistant for Jim Foster.

On July 17, 2014, Cerrato was named the interim head coach for the Rhode Island baseball team. After guiding the Rams to a 26–25–1 in 2015, Cerrato signed a 4-year contract to be the permanent head coach on July 23, 2015.

With a win against St. Joseph's on May 16, 2025, Cerrato became the winningest coach in Rhode Island baseball history.

== Head coaching record ==
Record table
Season	Team	Overall	Conference	Standing	Postseason
New Haven Chargers (East Coast Conference) (2007–2008)
2007	New Haven	28–18	16–11	5th	
2008	New Haven	24–25	17–10	3rd	
New Haven:			33-21		
New Haven Chargers (Northeast-10 Conference) (2009–2011)
2009	New Haven	22–21	16–14	5th	Northeast-10 Tournament
2010	New Haven	31–15	18–8	3rd	NCAA Regional
2011	New Haven	26–18	14–12	5th	Northeast-10 Tournament
New Haven:		131–97	48–34		
Rhode Island Rams (Atlantic 10 Conference) (2015–present)
2015	Rhode Island	26–25–1	15–9	T-2nd	Atlantic 10 tournament
2016	Rhode Island	31–27	18–6	1st	NCAA Regional
2017	Rhode Island	31–22	17–6	2nd	Atlantic 10 tournament
2018	Rhode Island	24–27	13–11	T-7th	
2019	Rhode Island	24–29	14–9	6th	Atlantic 10 tournament
2020	Rhode Island	8–5	0–0		Season canceled due to COVID-19
2021	Rhode Island	28–26–1	14–6	1st (North)	Atlantic 10 tournament
2022	Rhode Island	20–35	14–10	4th	Atlantic 10 tournament
2023	Rhode Island	23–29	13–11	7th	Atlantic 10 tournament
2024	Rhode Island	19–28	11–13	8th	
2025	Rhode Island	38–22	22–8	1st	NCAA Regional
2026	Rhode Island	26–30	16–14	T-5th	Atlantic 10 tournament
Rhode Island:		298–305–2 (.494)	167–103–0 (.619)		
Total:		429–402–2 (.516)			
National champion Postseason invitational champion Conference regular season champion Conference regular season and conference tournament champion Division regular season champion Division regular season and conference tournament champion Conference tournament champion

== See also ==
- List of current NCAA Division I baseball coaches
