= 2007 Atlantic 10 Conference baseball tournament =

American college baseball tournament

- Teams: 6
- Format: Six-team double elimination First-round byes for top two seeds
- Finals site: Fifth Third Field (Dayton); Dayton, OH
- Champions: Charlotte (1st title)
- Winning coach: Loren Hibbs (1st title)
- MVP: Shayne Moody (Charlotte)

The 2007 Atlantic 10 Conference Baseball Championship was held from May 23 through 26 at Fifth Third Field in Dayton, OH. It featured the top six regular-season finishers of the conference's 14 teams. Top-seeded Charlotte defeated Fordham in the title game to win the tournament for the first time, earning the Atlantic 10's automatic bid to the 2007 NCAA tournament.

== Seeding and format ==
The league's top six teams, based on winning percentage in the 27-game regular-season schedule, were seeded one through six. The top two seeds, Charlotte and Fordham, received byes into the second round of play in the double elimination tournament.

Team	W	L	Pct.	GB	Seed
Charlotte	23	4	.852	–	1
Fordham	19	8	.704	4	2
Richmond	18	9	.667	5	3
Xavier	17	10	.630	6	4
Rhode Island	16	11	.593	7	5
St. Bonaventure	14	12	.538	8.5	6
George Washington	14	13	.519	9	–
Massachusetts	13	14	.481	10	–
Saint Louis	12	14	.462	10.5	–
Duquesne	10	17	.370	13	–
Dayton	9	18	.333	14	–
Temple	9	18	.333	14	–
La Salle	8	19	.296	15	–
Saint Joseph's	6	21	.222	17	–

== Bracket ==
Upper round 1
5	Rhode Island	4
4	Xavier	3
6	St. Bonaventure	2
3	Richmond	8
Lower round 1
4	Xavier	15
6	St. Bonaventure	11
5	Rhode Island	0
4	Xavier	3

Upper round 2
1	Charlotte	11
5	Rhode Island	1
2	Fordham	3
3	Richmond	1
Lower round 2
3	Richmond	5
4	Xavier	4

Upper final
1	Charlotte	15
2	Fordham	2
Lower final
2	Fordham	11
3	Richmond	9

Final
1	Charlotte	18
2	Fordham	6

== All-Tournament Team ==
The following players were named to the All-Tournament Team. Charlotte shortstop Shayne Moody, one of five 49ers selected, was named Most Outstanding Player.

Pos.	Name	Team
P	Alex Hale	Richmond
2B	Adam Lipski	Xavier
P	Michael Luces	Xavier
OF	Brad McElroy	Charlotte
P	Adam Mills	Charlotte
SS	Shayne Moody	Charlotte
CF	Adam Pasono	Xavier
2B	Eric Reese	Fordham
P	Cory Riordan	Fordham
C	Kris Rochelle	Charlotte
DH	Chris Taylor	Charlotte
DH	Alex Wotring	Richmond
