= Day Air Ballpark =

Minor league baseball stadium in Dayton, Ohio, U.S.

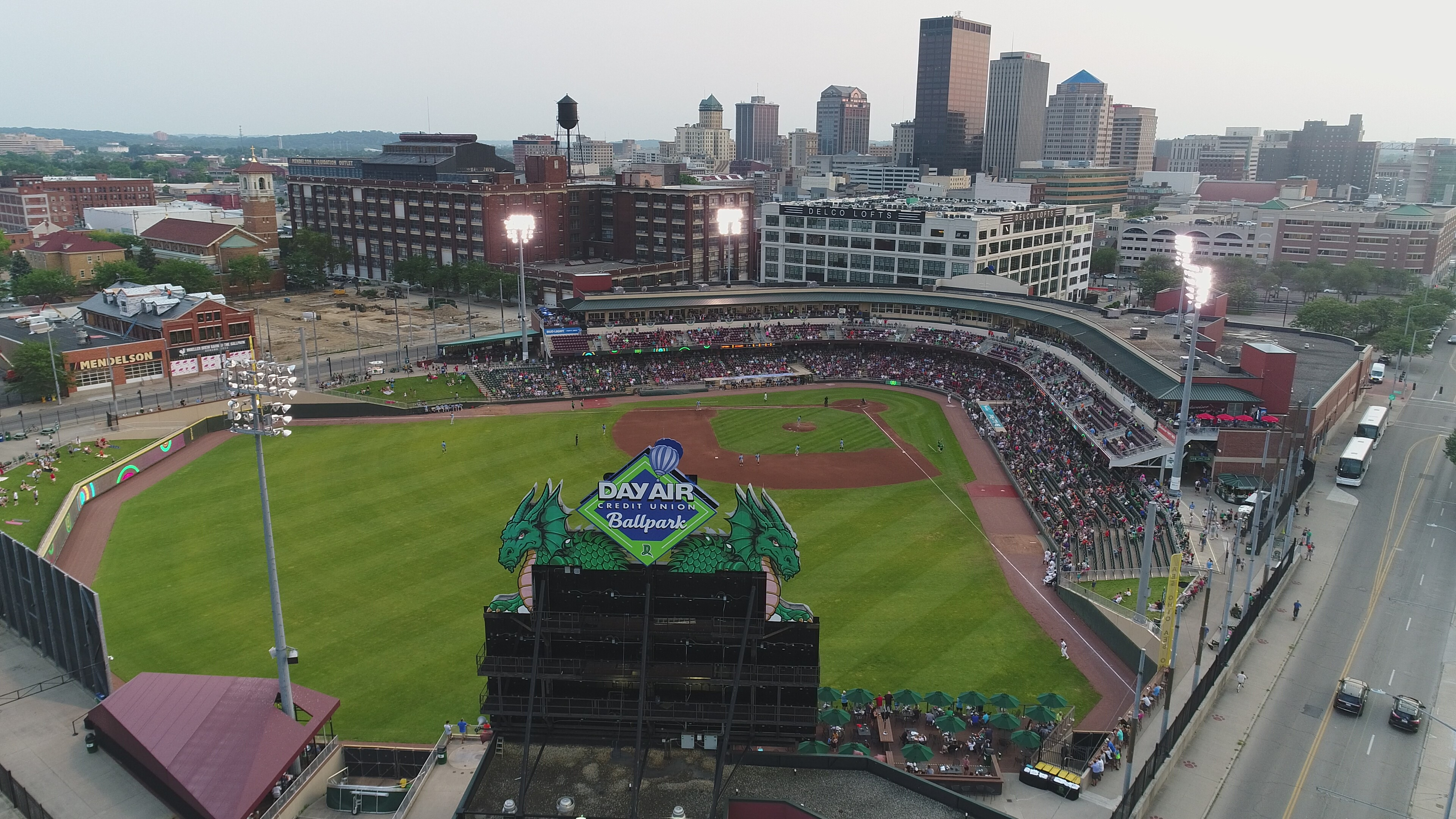
- Aerial shot of Day Air Ballpark

- Location within Ohio Location within the United States
- Interactive map of Day Air Ballpark
- Former names: Fifth Third Field (2000–2019)
- Address: 220 North Patterson Boulevard; Dayton, OH 45402
- Coordinates: 39°45′51″N 84°11′6″W
- Owner: City of Dayton
- Operator: Palisades Arcadia Baseball LLC
- Capacity: 7,230 seats ~1,000 lawn area
- Surface: Grass
- Record attendance: 9,507 (June 19, 2009)
- Field size: Left field – 320 ft (98 m); Center field – 400 ft (122 m); Right field – 320 ft (98 m)

Construction
- Groundbreaking: April 26, 1999
- Opened: April 23, 2000
- Cost: $23.5 million ($43.9 million in 2025 dollars)
- Architects: HNTB; Architects Associated, Inc.
- Project manager: Construction Process Solutions Ltd.
- Structural engineers: Fink Roberts & Petrie, Inc.
- Services engineer: Woolpert LLP
- General contractor: Danis Building Construction Company

Tenant
- Dayton Dragons (MWL) 2000–present

Day Air Ballpark, formerly known as Fifth Third Field, is a minor league baseball stadium in Dayton, Ohio, which is the home of the Dayton Dragons, the Midwest League affiliate of the nearby Cincinnati Reds. In 2011, the Dragons broke the all-time professional sports record for most consecutive sellouts by selling out the stadium for the 815th consecutive game, breaking the record formerly held by the Portland Trail Blazers.

The park has a total capacity of 8,200 people and opened in 2000. With two-deck seating and large skyboxes, some compare it to Triple-A fields.

== History ==
In their inaugural season in 2000, the Dragons managed to sell out every home game that year before the season even started. The Dragons played their home opener at Fifth Third Field on April 27, 2000. In attendance was Cincinnati Reds Hall of Famer Johnny Bench, who caught the ceremonial first pitch.

Day Air Ballpark has hosted the Midwest League All Star Game twice: in 2001 and 2013.

In 2005, 2007, and 2009, the venue hosted the Atlantic 10 Conference baseball tournament. In 2005, Rhode Island won the tournament, in 2007, Charlotte won, and in 2009 Xavier won.

=== 2011 field renovation ===
In the 2011–2012 offseason, a new Kentucky Blue Grass playing surface was installed at Fifth Third Field as well as new drainage and irrigation systems.

=== 2014–2015 video enhancements ===
In 2014, over $1.2 million was spent upgrading Fifth Third Field's entertainment control room and adding HD cameras throughout. In 2015, the existing video board was replaced in the off-season with a new 2,054 foot 13HD video board that was three times brighter than the previous board, twice the height and 2½ times the width. Described as featuring the clearest picture ever used on any board in a Minor League Baseball stadium, the board, at the time of installation, was the tallest and widest in a single A facility and in the top five in terms of size for any Minor League Baseball stadium. As of 2015, only three out of 30 Major League Baseball stadiums sported a board of this type.

=== Renaming and renewal ===
In January 2020, the naming rights to the field were purchased by Day Air Credit Union and the stadium was renamed Day Air Ballpark. In January 2021, it was reported that the Dayton City Commission had renewed the park's lease agreement, which had previously been scheduled to expire in September 2030, until 2060. Under the terms of the new agreement, the city will also secure financing for up to $4.5 million in improvements to the park, including improvements relating to energy efficiency. In June 2026, it was reported that the Dayton Dragons and Day Air Credit Union had reached a deal to extend naming rights on the stadium until 2040.

=== Fall 2025 improvements ===
In 2025, the Dayton Dragons announced the stadium's largest renovations since its opening, aimed to be completed in fall 2025. These include upgrades to lighting, heating, air conditioning, the sound system, and other technology improvements. They also feature the creation of the South Dayton Toyota Diamond Club, a luxury suite, which feature comfortable seats, exclusive dining options, and a climate-controlled space to watch the game. Regarding the upgrades, Brandy Guinaugh, the team's Executive Vice President, noted that the upgrades will allow the stadium to host events year-round.

== Facts and figures ==
- Voted as one of the top ten hottest tickets to get in all of professional sports by Sports Illustrated.
- The Dayton Dragons' series of 815 consecutive sellouts surpassed the Portland Trail Blazers for the longest sellout streak across all professional sports in the U.S.
- Highest single-season attendance: 593,633 (2004, a Midwest League Record)
- The facility has 7,320 stadium-style seats.
- The ballpark contains 1,400 club seats, 29 suites, and 3 party decks
- The stadium stands on the site of a former Delco Electronics plant.

== Amenities ==
Day Air Ballpark has contracted with Donatos Pizza to offer individual cheese and pepperoni pizzas at the ballpark. It has also contracted with Cold Stone Creamery to offer hand dipped ice cream available at a free standing cart on the third base side of the stadium as well as individual ice cream cups available at most concession stands. Along with the contracted food, many nonprofit organizations including churches, fraternal organizations and schools operate the concessions stands. In 2009, The People for Ethical Treatment of Animals (PETA) rated Day Air Ballpark one of the most vegetarian-friendly minor league ballparks in the United States.

== Other attractions ==
Besides Dayton Dragons baseball, the Day Air Ballpark hosts a number of other events and activities. Since 2021, the park has hosted college baseball games between the University of Dayton and Wright State University. In 2025, Day Air Ballpark began offering its holiday Deck the Diamond event from November 14, 2025 to January 3, 2026, featuring a light and music show, train rides, carnival games and other attractions.

Events and tenants
Preceded by Marinelli Field	Home of the Dayton Dragons; 2000 – present	Succeeded by Current
Preceded by Philip B. Elfstrom Stadium; Fifth Third Bank Ballpark	Host of the Midwest League All-Star Game; 2001; 2013	Succeeded by Oldsmobile Park; Fifth Third Ballpark
Preceded by Dodd Memorial Stadium; Jim Houlihan Park at Jack Coffey Field; Campbell's Field	Host of the Atlantic 10 Conference; Baseball Tournament; 2005; 2007; 2009	Succeeded by Jim Houlihan Park at Jack Coffey Field; Campbell's Field; Campbell's Field
