= 2005 Atlantic 10 Conference baseball tournament =

American college baseball tournament

- Teams: 6
- Format: Six-team double elimination First-round byes for division winners
- Finals site: Fifth Third Field (Dayton); Dayton, OH
- Champions: Rhode Island (1st title)
- Winning coach: Frank Leoni (1st title)
- MVP: Wayne Russo (Rhode Island)

The 2005 Atlantic 10 Conference Baseball Championship was held from May 25 through 28 at Fifth Third Field in Dayton, OH. It featured the top two regular-season finishers of each six-team division, plus the next two best finishers. Top-seeded Rhode Island defeated George Washington in the title game to win the tournament for the first time, earning the Atlantic 10's automatic bid to the 2005 NCAA tournament.

== Seeding and format ==
The league's top six teams, based on winning percentage in the 24-game regular season schedule, qualified for the field. The top two teams in each division qualified for the tournament automatically; the two division winners, Rhode Island in the East and George Washington in the West, received the top two seeds and byes through to the second round of the double elimination tournament.

Team	W	L	Pct.	GB	Seed
East Division
Rhode Island	18	6	.750	–	1
Fordham	17	7	.708	1	3
Massachusetts	9	15	.375	9	–
St. Bonaventure	8	16	.333	10	–
Saint Joseph's	8	16	.333	10	–
Temple	8	16	.333	10	–
West Division
George Washington	17	7	.708	–	2
Dayton	16	8	.667	1	4
Duquesne	13	11	.542	4	5
Richmond	12	12	.500	5	6
La Salle	9	15	.375	8	–
Xavier	9	15	.375	8	–

== Bracket ==
Upper round 1
5	Duquesne	5
4	Dayton	8
6	Richmond	4^{13}
3	Fordham	1
Lower round 1
5	Duquesne	9
3	Fordham	4
4	Dayton	13
5	Duquesne	9

Upper round 2
1	Rhode Island	7
4	Dayton	4
2	George Washington	3
6	Richmond	10
Lower round 2
2	George Washington	4
4	Dayton	2

Upper final
1	Rhode Island	8
6	Richmond	3
Lower final
6	Richmond	4
2	George Washington	10

Final
1	Rhode Island	9
2	George Washington	7

== All-Tournament Team ==
The following players were named to the All-Tournament Team. Rhode Island second baseman Wayne Russo, one of four Rams selected, was named Most Outstanding Player.

Rhode Island's Josh Nestor (2004) and George Washington's Ryan Roberson (2003) were second-time selections.

Pos.	Name	Team
P	Rob Berzinskas	Richmond
OF	Bryan Chandler	Dayton
P	Tom Davis	Fordham
OF	Brandon Godzik	Dayton
OF	Daryl Holcomb	Rhode Island
OF	Andrew Justice	Richmond
C	Josh Nestor	Rhode Island
1B	Ryan Roberson	George Washington
2B	Wayne Russo	Rhode Island
OF	David Savard	Rhode Island
OF	Bill Torre	Duquesne
P	Josh Wilkie	George Washington
