= WRIU =

Radio station at the University of Rhode Island

Kingston, Rhode Island; United States
- Broadcast area: Southeast New England
- Frequency: 90.3 MHz
- Branding: WRIU 90.3 FM

Programming
- Format: College radio

Ownership
- Owner: University of Rhode Island

History
- First air date: February 16, 1964
- Call sign meaning: "We're Rhode Island University"

Technical information
- Licensing authority: FCC
- Facility ID: 69206
- Class: A
- ERP: 3,400 watts
- HAAT: 128 meters (420 ft)
- Transmitter coordinates: 41°29′52.4″N 71°31′41.2″W

Links
- Public license information: Public file; LMS
- Webcast: Listen live
- Website: www.wriu.org

WRIU (90.3 FM) is a non-commercial radio station broadcasting a college radio format. Licensed to Kingston, Rhode Island, United States, the station serves the greater Rhode Island area. The station is owned by University of Rhode Island. The broadcast area reaches almost all of Rhode Island, and portions of Connecticut, Massachusetts, and Long Island. WRIU began broadcasting on February 16, 1964, on 91.1 MHz (Channel 216) with a power of 10 watts.

== About ==
Weekday programming includes student and community member DJs shows featuring jazz, classical music, hip hop, folk, roots rock, indie rock, noise rock, electronica and experimental music, along with public affairs, sports, and news programming. A two-hour freeform block reserved for URI students also airs each weekday. Weekends have a less structured schedule, with an emphasis on world and electronic music, as well as children's, sports and specialty programming. WRIU has traditionally supported local and independent artists across its programming lineup.

== RIU2 ==
WRIU also operates RIU2 (formerly Studio B), an internet-only station with an air staff composed exclusively of URI students and a freeform format. The original purpose of RIU2 was to train and prepare DJs for the transition to FM, but the diversity and quality of shows on RIU2 have made it a significantly popular internet radio station in its own right.

== History ==
When the station first signed on in 1964, WRIU's music format was mostly jazz, classical, some folk music, and easy listening. The station signal was 10 watts and coverage was generally just nearby to the campus, sometimes reaching farther. When the station wished to expand in about 1971, installing a more powerful signal with updated facilities, the U.S. Federal Communications Commission (FCC) requirements included surveying the current and potential audience- mostly URI students- to show support for FCC approval of such expansion. A music listener survey was conducted by WRIU staff, collated, and results were published to help establish a new format based on the survey of listener preferences. This helped WRIU gain the support of URI students and the URI Student Senate, which voted to fund the purchase of equipment for expansion by about 1972. The new music format that was established in 1971 was unique in Rhode Island and continues, flexibly now inclusive of many new musical influences.

== Tower Damage ==
On August 22nd, 2021, Hurricane Henri landed in Westerly, Rhode Island leading to the WRIU 90.3's transmitter tower sustaining permanent damage that required a complete deconstruction and reconstruction. As of November 2025, the tower has entered the final phases of the repair process, with costs reaching $1.55 million.. With the repairs WRIU's reach will return to their original range, covering all of Rhode Island, some parts of Massachusetts, some parts of Connecticut and Long Island, NY.
