= Bill Beck Field =

Baseball venue in Kingston, Rhode Island

- The Beck
- Interactive map of Bill Beck Field
- Location: University of Rhode Island Campus; Tootell Road, Kingston, Rhode Island, USA
- Coordinates: 41.484958°N 71.537513°W
- Owner: University of Rhode Island
- Operator: University of Rhode Island
- Capacity: 1,000
- Surface: FieldTurf (2009–present); Natural grass (1966–2009)
- Scoreboard: Electronic
- Field size: Left Field: 330 feet (100 m); Left Center Field: 375 feet (114 m); Center Field: 400 feet (120 m); Right Center Field: 375 feet (114 m); Right Field: 330 feet (100 m)

Construction
- Built: 1966
- Renovated: 2000–2002, 2007–2011

Tenant
- Rhode Island Rams baseball (NCAA D1 A-10) (1966–present)

Bill Beck Field is a baseball venue located on the campus of the University of Rhode Island in Kingston, Rhode Island, United States. It is home to the Rhode Island Rams baseball team, a member of the NCAA Division I Atlantic 10 Conference. The field was built in 1966 and is named after former Rams baseball and football coach Bill Beck. It has a capacity of 1,000 spectators.

The field is located behind Mackal Field House, the home venue of Rhode Island's men's and women's indoor track & field teams.

== Renovations ==
In 2000, extensive renovations to the field began. The playing surface was leveled and resodded, and a new sprinkler system was added. In 2001, the field's dugouts were replaced. In 2002, an electronic scoreboard was installed, two batting cages were added down the right field line, and the field's fencing was replaced. Later, matching batting cages were added down the left field line.

In 2007, an anonymous $1 million donation to the baseball program led to $1.4 million renovations on Bill Beck Field. Completed in time for the 2009 season, a new backstop, scoreboard, fencing, and bullpens were constructed, and a new FieldTurf surface was installed. In 2011, an indoor hitting facility with three batting cages was constructed along the right side of the field.

Further renovations are planned to construct an "improved grandstand/bleacher/pressbox setup" once additional fundraising goals are met.

== Other uses ==
In 2013, the field was used for the final game of the America East Tournament, after rain and scheduling conflicts forced America East Conference officials to move the game from its scheduled venue, Edward A. LeLacheur Park in Lowell, Massachusetts. In the game, Binghamton defeated Maine, 4–0.

The venue is also used for other amateur tournaments.

== See also ==
- List of NCAA Division I baseball venues
