= 2004 Atlantic 10 Conference baseball tournament =

American college baseball tournament

- Teams: 6
- Format: Six-team double elimination First-round byes for division winners
- Finals site: Dodd Stadium; Norwich, CT
- Champions: St. Bonaventure (1st title)
- Winning coach: Larry Sudbrook (1st title)
- MVP: Brian Pellegrini (St. Bonaventure)

The 2004 Atlantic 10 Conference Baseball Championship was held from May 26 through 30 at Dodd Stadium in Norwich, Connecticut. It featured the top two regular-season finishers of each six-team division, plus the next two best finishers. Fourth-seeded St. Bonaventure defeated Rhode Island in the title game to win the tournament for the first time, earning the Atlantic 10's automatic bid to the 2004 NCAA tournament.

== Seeding and format ==
The league's top six teams, based on winning percentage in the 24-game regular season schedule, qualified for the field. The top two teams in each division qualified for the tournament automatically; the two division winners, Rhode Island in the East and George Washington in the West, received the top two seeds and byes through to the second round of the double elimination tournament.

Team	W	L	Pct.	GB	Seed
East Division
Rhode Island	20	4	.833	–	1
St. Bonaventure	14	7	.667	4.5	4
Fordham	13	11	.542	7	5
Massachusetts	10	14	.417	10	–
Temple	10	14	.417	10	–
Saint Joseph's	4	20	.167	16	–
West Division
George Washington	19	5	.792	–	2
Richmond	17	7	.708	2	3
Duquesne	11	10	.524	6.5	6
Dayton	11	13	.458	8	–
Xavier	7	17	.292	12	–
La Salle	5	19	.208	14	–

== Bracket ==
Upper round 1
5	Fordham	4
4	St. Bonaventure	5
6	Duquesne	2
3	Richmond	4
Lower round 1
5	Fordham	4
6	Duquesne	3
2	George Washington	6
5	Fordham	4

Upper round 2
1	Rhode Island	6
4	St. Bonaventure	7^{11}
2	George Washington	0
3	Richmond	3
Lower round 2
1	Rhode Island	8
2	George Washington	4

Upper final
4	St. Bonaventure	10
3	Richmond	9
Lower final
3	Richmond	3
1	Rhode Island	10

Final
4	St. Bonaventure	3
1	Rhode Island	2

== All-Tournament Team ==
The following players were named to the All-Tournament Team. St. Bonaventure's Brian Pellegrini, one of three Bonnies selected, was named Most Outstanding Player.

Richmond's Thomas Martin (2002) and Bobby LeNoir (2003) were second-time selections.

Pos.	Name	Team
1B	Dan Batz	Rhode Island
1B	Jim Fasano	Richmond
DH	Joe Gwozdz	Fordham
SS	Bobby LeNoir	Richmond
P	Thomas Martin	Richmond
C	Josh Nestor	Rhode Island
P/OF	Brian Pellegrini	St. Bonaventure
P	Michael Proctor	St. Bonaventure
3B	Mike Rainville	Rhode Island
P	Stephen Holmes	Rhode Island
OF	Joe Rizzo	St. Bonaventure
