= 2023 Saint Joseph's Hawks baseball team =

American college baseball season

2023 Saint Joseph's Hawks baseball
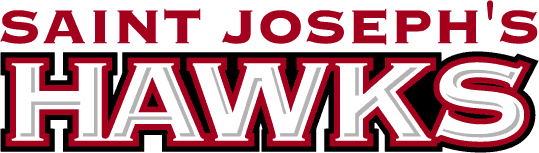

Atlantic 10 regular season champions
- Conference: Atlantic 10 Conference
- Record: 28–24–1 (17–7 A-10)
- Head coach: Fritz Hamburg (15th season)
- Assistant coach: Lee Saverio (3rd season)
- Hitting coach: Ryan Wheeler (9th season)
- Pitching coach: Pat Brown (2nd season)
- Captains: Cole Stetzar; Cole Walker
- Home stadium: Smithson Field

2023 Atlantic 10 Conference baseball standings
	Conf.						Overall
Team	W		L		T	PCT	W		L		T	PCT
Saint Joseph's ‍†‍‍	17	–	7	–	0	.708	28	–	24	–	1	.538
Davidson ‍‍‍	15	–	8	–	0	.652	30	–	24	–	0	.556
Saint Louis ‍‍‍	15	–	9	–	0	.625	33	–	23	–	0	.589
Dayton ‍‍‍	15	–	9	–	0	.625	26	–	34	–	0	.433
Richmond ‍‍‍	14	–	9	–	0	.609	27	–	28	–	0	.491
George Mason ‍‍‡‍^{y}	13	–	10	–	0	.565	36	–	27	–	0	.571
Rhode Island ‍‍‍	13	–	11	–	0	.542	23	–	29	–	0	.442
George Washington ‍‍‍	11	–	12	–	0	.478	21	–	34	–	0	.382
VCU ‍‍‍	11	–	13	–	0	.458	25	–	30	–	0	.455
Fordham ‍‍‍	7	–	17	–	0	.292	19	–	36	–	0	.345
UMass ‍‍‍	6	–	18	–	0	.250	14	–	35	–	0	.286
St. Bonaventure ‍‍‍	5	–	19	–	0	.208	8	–	40	–	0	.167
† – Conference champion ‡ – Tournament champion y – Invited to the NCAA tournament As of June 25, 2023; Rankings from D1Baseball

The 2023 Saint Joseph's Hawks baseball team represented Saint Joseph's University during the 2023 NCAA Division I baseball season. The Hawks played their home games at Smithson Field as a member of the Atlantic 10 Conference. They were led by head coach Fritz Hamburg, in his fifteenth season with the program.

Saint Joseph's won their first Atlantic 10 regular season title in program history, amassing a conference record of 17–7. They were eliminated in the 2023 Atlantic 10 Conference baseball tournament after going 1–2.

== Background ==
The 2022 team finished the season with a 29–25 overall record and a 12–11 record in Atlantic 10 play. They were seeded sixth overall in the 2022 Atlantic 10 Conference baseball tournament where they finished with a 1–2 record. They did not receive an at-large berth into the 2022 NCAA Division I baseball tournament.

== Personnel ==
=== Starters ===
Lineup
Pos.	No.	Player.	Year
C	43	Justin Igoe	Junior
1B	17	Luke Zimmerman	RS Senior
2B	5	Ryan Weingartner	Freshman
3B	30	Nate Thomas	Graduate
SS	4	Luca Trigiani	Senior
LF	27	Brett Callahan	Junior
CF	8	Conlan Wall	Junior
RF	13	Ryan Picollo	Junior
DH	47	Ryan Cesarini	Sophomore

Weekend pitching rotation
Day	No.	Player.	Year
Friday	33	Ryan DeSanto	Freshman
Saturday	12	Will McCausland	Freshman
Sunday	28	David Owsik	Junior

=== Batter depth chart ===
Pos	Starters	Bench 1	Bench 2
C	Justin Igoe	Travis Rinker	Carter Jagiela
1B	Luke Zimmerman	Brandon Drapeau	Dean Bergmann
2B	Ryan Weingartner	Colin Myers	Paul Kokol
3B	Nate Thomas	Max Hitman	Jakob Reed
SS	Luca Trigiani	Cam Walker	
LF	Brett Callahan		
CF	Conlan Wall	Nick Embleton	
RF	Ryan Picollo		
DH	Ryan Cesarini	Adam Fine	

=== Pitcher depth chart ===
Day	SP	RP	CP
Friday	Ryan DeSanto	Ryan DeSanto; Luke Zimmerman; Mike Picollo	Cole Stetzar
Saturday	Will McCausland	Alec Rodriguez; Mike Falco; Nico Torres	Matt McShane
Sunday	David Owsik	Patrick Shearer; Sam Davies; Noah Tincher	Peter Gallo
Mid-Week	Dominic Picone	Luke Gabrysh; Frank Ciccone; Ryan Basarab	Frank Ciccone

=== Roster ===
2023 Saint Joseph's Hawks baseball team
Players
Coaches

#	Pos.	Name	B/T	Height	Weight	Year	Home town
2	RHP	Cole Stetzar (C)	R/R	6 ft 0 in (1.83 m)	220 lb (100 kg)	Gr	Scranton, PA
3	INF	Cam Walker	R/R	5 ft 8 in (1.73 m)	161 lb (73 kg)	Sr	Canonsburg, PA
4	INF	Luca Trigiani	R/R	6 ft 1 in (1.85 m)	209 lb (95 kg)	Sr	Brooklyn, NY
5		Ryan Weingartner	R/R	5 ft 11 in (1.8 m)	170 lb (77 kg)	Fr	Berlin, NJ
6	RHP	Luke Smith	R/R	6 ft 1 in (1.85 m)	203 lb (92 kg)	RS Sr	Delran, NJ
8	OF	Conlan Wall	R/R	5 ft 8 in (1.73 m)	162 lb (73 kg)	Jr	Souderton, PA
9	OF	Nick Senior	R/R	5 ft 11 in (1.8 m)	174 lb (79 kg)	Jr	Cherry Hill, NJ
11	OF	Adam Fine	R/R	5 ft 11 in (1.8 m)	165 lb (75 kg)	Sr	Wynnewood, PA
12	RHP	Will McCausland	R/R	6 ft 0 in (1.83 m)	175 lb (79 kg)	Fr	Harleysville, PA
13	OF	Ryan Picollo	R/R	6 ft 4 in (1.93 m)	232 lb (105 kg)	Jr	Leawood, KS
14	C	Jakob Reed	L/R	6 ft 0 in (1.83 m)	195 lb (88 kg)	Jr	Yorba Linda, CA
15	INF	Max Hitman	R/R	5 ft 10 in (1.78 m)	174 lb (79 kg)	Jr	Norristown, PA
16	RHP	Patrick Shearer	R/R	6 ft 0 in (1.83 m)	223 lb (101 kg)	Sr	Dallas, TX
17	LHP	Luke Zimmerman	L/L	6 ft 1 in (1.85 m)	204 lb (93 kg)	RS Sr	Broomall, PA
18	RHP	Alec Rodriguez	R/R	6 ft 0 in (1.83 m)	184 lb (83 kg)	Sr	Cherry Hill, NJ
19	RHP	Frank Ciccone	R/R	6 ft 2 in (1.88 m)	210 lb (95 kg)	Fr	Hanover, NJ
20	RHP	Luke Gabrysh	R/R	6 ft 3 in (1.91 m)	188 lb (85 kg)	So	Wilmington, DE
22	RHP	Mike Picollo	R/R	6 ft 3 in (1.91 m)	215 lb (98 kg)	Gr	Leawood, KS
23	RHP	Matt McShane	R/R	6 ft 3 in (1.91 m)	201 lb (91 kg)	So	Bensalem, PA
24	RHP	Mike Falco	R/R	6 ft 3 in (1.91 m)	209 lb (95 kg)	Gr	East Brunswick, NJ
25	LHP	Richie Kerstetter	L/L	6 ft 0 in (1.83 m)	225 lb (102 kg)	Fr	Fairfield, CT
26	C	Carter Jagiela	R/R	6 ft 4 in (1.93 m)	200 lb (91 kg)	Fr	Telford, PA
27	OF	Brett Callahan	L/R	6 ft 0 in (1.83 m)	192 lb (87 kg)	Jr	Newark, DE
28	RHP	David Owsik	R/R	6 ft 2 in (1.88 m)	205 lb (93 kg)	Jr	Downingtown, PA
30	INF	Nate Thomas	L/R	6 ft 5 in (1.96 m)	217 lb (98 kg)	Gr	Hockessin, DE
31	INF	Nick Embleton	R/R	6 ft 3 in (1.91 m)	204 lb (93 kg)	Sr	Enola, PA
32	RHP	Sam Davies	R/R	6 ft 3 in (1.91 m)	206 lb (93 kg)	So	Ashburn, VA
33	LHP	Ryan DeSanto	L/L	6 ft 4 in (1.93 m)	200 lb (91 kg)	Fr	Frederick, MD
34	RHP	Drew DeSanto	R/R	6 ft 4 in (1.93 m)	200 lb (91 kg)	Fr	Frederick, MD
35	INF	Brandon Drapeau	R/R	6 ft 6 in (1.98 m)	230 lb (104 kg)	Sr	Mullica Hill, NJ
37	LHP	Nicholas Torres	L/L	6 ft 1 in (1.85 m)	190 lb (86 kg)	Sr	Marlboro, NJ
38	C	Dean Bergmann	R/R	6 ft 0 in (1.83 m)	200 lb (91 kg)	So	Philadelphia, PA
39	C	Travis Rinker	R/R	6 ft 2 in (1.88 m)	210 lb (95 kg)	Sr	Monrovia, MD
40	LHP	Noah Tincher	L/L	6 ft 3 in (1.91 m)	182 lb (83 kg)	So	Hamilton, OH
41	RHP	Domenic Picone	R/R	5 ft 8 in (1.73 m)	172 lb (78 kg)	Jr	Garnet Valley, PA
43	C	Justin Igoe	R/R	5 ft 11 in (1.8 m)	195 lb (88 kg)	Jr	Ivyland, PA
44	RHP	Peter Gallo	R/R	6 ft 4 in (1.93 m)	238 lb (108 kg)	Sr	Asbury Park, NJ
47	OF	Ryan Cesarini	L/R	5 ft 10 in (1.78 m)	210 lb (95 kg)	So	Archbald, PA
49	RHP	Ryan Basarab	R/R	6 ft 5 in (1.96 m)	230 lb (104 kg)	Jr	West Chester, PA
50	INF	Paul Kokol	L/R	6 ft 3 in (1.91 m)	221 lb (100 kg)	Jr	Ardmore, PA
52	INF	Colin Myers	R/R	5 ft 8 in (1.73 m)	160 lb (73 kg)	So	Philadelphia, PA

Head coach

Fritz Hamburg

Assistant coach(es)

Ryan Wheeler
Pat Brown
Lee Saverio

Legend

- (C) Team captain
- (S) Suspended
- (I) Ineligible
- Injured
- Current redshirt

Roster
Last update: April 22, 2023

=== Coaching staff ===
2023 Saint Joseph's Hawks baseball coaching staff
Name	Position	Seasons at SJU	Alma mater
Fritz Hamburg	Head coach	15	Ithaca College (1988)
Ryan Wheeler	Associate Head Coach/Batting Coach	9	Pennsylvania State University (1994)
Pat Brown	Assistant Coach/Pitching Coach	2	State University of New York at Oswego (2015)
Lee Saverio	Volunteer Assistant Coach	2	Bloomsburg University (1986)
Mike Bibbo	Athletic Trainer	6	Sacred Heart University (2017)
Evangelos Regas	Assistant Strength and Conditioning Coach	1	Temple University (2013)
Kyle Pinkava	Student Manager	1	Saint Joseph's University (2023)
Nino Aquino	Student Manager	1	Saint Joseph's University (2023)
Carter McKeown	Student Manager	1	Saint Joseph's University (2024)
Jack Wheeler	Student Manager	1	Saint Joseph's University (2024)
Brendan Coughlin	Student Manager	1	Saint Joseph's University (2024)
Kate Maginnis	Social Media Team	2	University of West Georgia (2021)

== Offseason ==
=== Departures ===
SJU Departures
Name	Number	Pos.	Height	Weight	Year	Hometown	Notes
Liam Bendo	5	INF	6 ft 0 in (1.83 m)	204	Graduate	Glen Mills, Pennsylvania	Graduated
Jake Artz	8	OF	5 ft 10 in (1.78 m)	166	Graduate	Harrisburg, Pennsylvania	Graduated
Ryan Devine	12	RHP	6 ft 4 in (1.93 m)	215	Graduate	Williamsburg, Virginia	Graduated
Tim Cavanaugh	19	OF	5 ft 11 in (1.80 m)	198	Senior	Plains, Pennsylvania	Graduated
Ian McCole	22	RHP	6 ft 0 in (1.83 m)	232	Senior	Frackville, Pennsylvania	Graduated
Brendan Hueth	25	OF	6 ft 3 in (1.91 m)	200	Senior	Spring Lake, New Jersey	Graduated
Andrew Cossetti	33	C	6 ft 0 in (1.83 m)	215	Senior	Eagleville, Pennsylvania	Graduated

=== Transfers ===
Incoming transfers
Name	Number	Pos.	Height	Weight	Year	Hometown	Previous School
Mike Picollo	22	RHP	6 ft 3 in (1.91 m)	215	Gr.	Leawood, Kansas	UNC Wilmington
Domenic Picone	41	RHP	5 ft 8 in (1.73 m)	172	Jr.	Garnet Valley, Pennsylvania	Rhode Island

=== Signing Day Recruits ===
The following players signed National Letter of Intents to play for Saint Joseph's in 2023.

Player	Hometown	High School
Pitchers
Frank Ciccone	Hanover, New Jersey	Pope John XXIII
Drew DeSanto	Frederick, Maryland	Tusacarora (MD)
Ryan DeSanto	Frederick, Maryland	Tusacarora (MD)
Richie Kerstetter	Fairfield, Connecticut	Canterbury (CT)
Will McCausland	Harleysville, Pennsylvania	Souderton Area HS
Hitters
Carter Jagiela	Telford, Pennsylvania	Souderton Area HS
Ryan Weingartner	Berlin, New Jersey	St. Augustine (NJ)

== Game log ==
2023 Saint Joseph's Hawks baseball game log (28–24–1)
Regular season (27–22–1)

February (1–2)
Date	Opponent	Rank	Site/stadium	Score	Win	Loss	Save	TV	Attendance	Overall record	A10 record
February 17	at Duke*		Durham Bulls Athletic Park; Durham, NC	**L** 0–16	Santucci (1–0)	**Picone** (0–1)	None	ACCNX	364	0–1	—
February 18	at Duke*		Durham Bulls Athletic Park	**L** 1–2	Higgins (1–0)	**Stetzar** (0–1)	Tallon (1)	ACCNX	638	0–2	—
February 19	at Duke*		Durham Bulls Athletic Park	**W** 5–4^{10}	**Gabrysh** (1–0)	Beilenson (0–1)	**Stetzar** (1)	ACCNX	717	1–2	—

March (8–10)
Date	Opponent	Rank	Site/stadium	Score	Win	Loss	Save	TV	Attendance	Overall record	A10 record
March 1	at Rutgers*		Bainton Field; Piscataway, NJ	**L** 3–6	Parliament (1–0)	**Gabrysh** (1–1)	Gorski (1)	BTN+	322	1–3	—
March 3	at Old Dominion*		Bud Metheny Baseball Complex; Norfolk, VA	**L** 4–15	Morgan (2–0)	**Picone** (0–2)	None	ESPN+	779	1–4	—
March 4	at Old Dominion*		Bud Metheny Baseball Complex	**L** 0–11	Armstrong (2–0)	**McCausland** (0–1)	None	ESPN+	779	1–5	—
March 5	at Old Dominion*		Bud Metheny Baseball Complex	**L** 11–13	Cook (2–0)	**Owsik** (0–1)	Bashara (1)	ESPN+	362	1–6	—
March 10	UMass Lowell*		Smithson Field; Merion, PA	**W** 4–3	**McCausland** (1–1)	Keevan (0–4)	**Gallo** (1)	ESPN+	110	2–6	—
March 11	UMass Lowell*		Smithson Field	**W** 7–1	**McShane** (1–0)	Draper (1–2)	None	ESPN+	212	3–6	—
March 12	UMass Lowell*		Smithson Field	**W** 9–3	**Falco** (1–0)	DiRito (1–1)	None	ESPN+	220	4–6	—
Ting Stadium Series
March 14	vs. Notre Dame*		Ting Stadium; Holly Springs, NC	**L** 3–6	Hely (1–1)	**Ciccone** (0–1)	Bosch (2)	ESPN+	163	4–7	—
March 15	vs. Notre Dame*		Ting Stadium	**L** 9–10	Cooper (1–0)	**Rodriguez** (0–1)	None	ESPN+	147	4–8	—
March 17	Iona*		Smithson Field	**W** 15–5	**Gallo** (1–0)	Torrado (0–3)	**Ciccone** (1)	ESPN+	171	5–8	—
March 18	Iona*		Smithson Field	**W** 16–6^{8}	**McShane** (2–0)	Chiaia (0–3)	None	ESPN+	318	6–8	—
March 19	Iona*		Smithson Field	**W** 13–0^{7}	**Picone** (1–2)	Untracht (0–3)	None	ESPN+	308	7–8	—
March 21	Monmouth*		Smithson Field	**L** 8–9	Horvath (1–0)	**Stetzar** (0–2)	Kent (1)	ESPN+	221	7–9	—
March 24	Maine*		Smithson Field	**W** 3–2	**Stetzar** (1–2)	Baeyens (0–1)	None	ESPN+	180	8–9	—
March 25	Maine*		Smithson Field	**L** 12–17	Scott (1–2)	**Ciccone** (0–2)	None	ESPN+	155	8–10	—
March 26	Maine*		Smithson Field	**L** 13–15	Lewis (2–1)	**Picone** (1–3)	None	ESPN+	325	8–11	—
Liberty Bell Classic
March 28	at Delaware*		Bob Hannah Stadium; Newark, DE	**L** 3–9	Grome (2–0)	**Owsik** (0–2)	Margolis (1)	FloSports	4,228	8–12	—
March 31	at Richmond		Malcolm U. Pitt Field; Richmond, VA	**W** 19–13	**McCausland** (2–1)	Argomaniz (2–3)	None	ESPN+	313	9–12	1–0

April (10–7–1)
Date	Opponent	Rank	Site/stadium	Score	Win	Loss	Save	TV	Attendance	Overall record	A10 record
April 1	at Richmond		Malcolm U. Pitt Field	**W** 15–0	**DeSanto** (1–0)	Weirather (2–2)	None	ESPN+	303	10–12	2–0
April 2	at Richmond		Malcolm U. Pitt Field	**L** 2–7	Subers (2–0)	**Picone** (1–4)	None	ESPN+	413	10–13	2–1
Liberty Bell Classic
April 5	Penn*		Smithson Field	**L** 6–18	Cerwinski (2–0)	**Picollo** (0–1)	None	ESPN+	182	10–14	—
April 7	VCU		Smithson Field	**W** 5–3	**McCausland** (3–1)	Gordon (2–2)	**McShane** (1)	ESPN+	274	11–14	3–1
April 8	VCU		Smithson Field	**W** 12–3	**Stetzar** (2–2)	Peters (1–3)	None	ESPN+	308	12–14	4–1
April 9	VCU		Smithson Field	**L** 7–11	Ellis (4–2)	**Shearer** (0–1)	None	ESPN+	302	12–15	4–2
April 11	at Delaware*		Bob Hannah Stadium	**L** 10–13	Margolis (3–0)	Ciccone (0–3)	None	FloSports	165	12–16	—
April 14	at Saint Louis		Billiken Sports Center; St. Louis, MO	**L** 2–4	Litman (4–1)	**McCausland** (3–2)	Bell (1)	ESPN+	180	12–17	4–3
April 15	at Saint Louis		Billiken Sports Center	**L** 6–10	Chaffin (4–1)	**DeSanto** (1–1)	Weber (1)	ESPN+	201	12–18	4–4
April 16	at Saint Louis		Billiken Sports Center	**L** 8–14	Holmes (2–0)	**Picone** (1–5)	None	ESPN+	121	12–19	4–5
April 21	UMass		Smithson Field	**W** 5–3	**McCausland** (4–2)	Belliveau (0–1)	**Stetzar** (2)	ESPN+	201	13–19	5–5
April 22	UMass		Smithson Field	**W** 12–3	**Owsik** (1–2)	Perrett (1–5)	None	ESPN+	400	14–19	6–5
April 23	UMass		Smithson Field	**W** 7–3	**Picone** (2–5)	Steele (0–3)	**McShane** (2)	ESPN+	323	15–19	7–5
April 25	Delaware*		Smithson Field	**W** 5–2	**Gallo** (2–0)	Grome (2–2)	**Stetzar** (3)	ESPN+	152	16–19	—
April 26	Bucknell*		Smithson Field	**T** 7–7^{7}	None	None	None	ESPN+	126	16–19–1	—
April 28	Fordham		Smithson Field	**W** 2–1	**McShane** (3–0)	Hughes (1–3)	**Stetzar** (4)	ESPN+	122	17–19–1	8–5
April 29	Fordham		Smithson Field	**W** 23–10	**Falco** (2–0)	Sachen (0–3)	None	ESPN+	129	18–19–1	9–5
April 30	Fordham		Smithson Field	**W** 7–1	**Picone** (3–5)	Egan (0–1)	None	ESPN+	153	19–19–1	10–5

May (8–3)
Date	Opponent	Rank	Site/stadium	Score	Win	Loss	Save	TV	Attendance	Overall record	A10 record
May 3	Villanova*		Smithson Field	**W** 13–6	**Gallo** (3–0)	Povey (0–1)	None	ESPN+	220	20–19–1	—
May 5	at Dayton		Woerner Field; Dayton, OH	**L** 9–16	Zapka (2–0)	**Falco** (2–1)	None	ESPN+	163	20–20–1	10–6
May 6	at Dayton		Woerner Field	**W** 7–5	**DeSanto** (2–1)	Majick (3–4)	**Stetzar** (5)	ESPN+	163	21–20–1	11–6
May 7	at Dayton		Woerner Field	**W** 15–2	**Picone** (4–5)	Steinhauer (1–5)	None	ESPN+	138	22–20–1	12–6
May 12	Rhode Island		Smithson Field	**W** 15–3	**McCausland** (5–2)	Sposato (3–6)	None	ESPN+	374	23–20–1	13–6
May 13	Rhode Island		Smithson Field	**W** 12–6	**DeSanto** (3–1)	Levesque (5–4)	None	ESPN+	413	24–20–1	14–6
May 14	Rhode Island		Smithson Field	**W** 6–5	**Gabrysh** (2–1)	Hsu (0–1)	None	ESPN+	425	25–20–1	15–6
May 16	at Villanova*		Villanova Ballpark; Plymouth Meeting, PA	**L** 4–8	Udell (1–6)	**Rodriguez** (0–2)	None	SECN+	197	25–21–1	—
May 18	at George Mason		Spuhler Field; Fairfax, VA	**W** 9–4	**Falco** (3–1)	Stewart (1–2)	None	ESPN+	65	26–21–1	16–6
May 19	at George Mason		Spuhler Field	**L** 3–4	Mracna (3–1)	**Stetzar** (2–3)	None	ESPN+	143	26–22–1	16–7
May 20	at George Mason		Spuhler Field	**W** 13–6	**Picone** (5–5)	Grant (0–1)	None	ESPN+	266	27–22–1	17–7

Post-Season (1–2)

Atlantic 10 tournament (1–2)
Date	Opponent	Rank	Site/stadium	Score	Win	Loss	Save	TV	Attendance	Overall record	A10T record
Winner's bracket
May 24	vs. (4) Saint Louis	(1)	The Diamond; Richmond, VA	**L** 8–23	Litman (6–3)	**McCausland** (5–3)	None	ESPN+	100	27–23–1	0–1
Consolation bracket
May 25	vs. (5) Richmond	(1)	The Diamond	**W** 4–0	**DeSanto** (4–1)	Weirather (5–4)	None	ESPN+	100	28–23–1	1–1
May 26	vs. (3) Dayton	(1)	The Diamond	**L** 10–15	Bard (3–3)	**Picone** (5–6)	None	ESPN+	100	28–24–1	1–2

*Denotes non–conference game • Schedule source • Rankings based on the teams' current ranking in the D1Baseball poll
**W** Saint Joseph's win • **L** Saint Joseph's loss • **T** Saint Joseph's tie • Postponement or cancellation • **Bold** denotes Saint Joseph's player

== Tournaments ==
=== Atlantic 10 tournament ===
Atlantic 10 Tournament Teams
(1) Saint Joseph's Hawks	(2) Davidson Wildcats	(3) Dayton Flyers	(4) Saint Louis Billikens	(5) Richmond Spiders	(6) George Mason Patriots	(7) Rhode Island Rams

Upper round 1	Upper round 2	Upper final	Final
1	Saint Joseph's	8
4	Saint Louis	23
4	Saint Louis	6
5	Richmond	3
4	Saint Louis	6
6	George Mason	5
3	Dayton	4
6	George Mason	5
6	George Mason	15
2	Davidson	11
2	Davidson	8
7	Rhode Island	4
4	Saint Louis	1	2
6	George Mason	4	6
Lower round 1	Lower round 2	Lower round 3	Lower final
1	Saint Joseph's	4
7	Rhode Island	3	5	Richmond	0	6	George Mason	3
5	Richmond	13	1	Saint Joseph's	10	3	Dayton	2
3	Dayton	15
3	Dayton	15
2	Davidson	4

== Rankings ==
Ranking movements Legend: — = Not ranked
	Week																			
Poll	Pre	1	2	3	4	5	6	7	8	9	10	11	12	13	14	15	16	17	18	Final
Coaches'	—	—*	—	—	—	—	—	—	—	—	—	—	—	—	—	—	—	—	—	—
Baseball America	—	—	—	—	—	—	—	—	—	—	—	—	—	—	—	—	—	—	—	—
Collegiate Baseball^	—	—	—	—	—	—	—	—	—	—	—	—	—	—	—	—	—	—	—	—
NCBWA†	—	—	—	—	—	—	—	—	—	—	—	—	—	—	—	—	—	—	—	—
D1Baseball	—	—	—	—	—	—	—	—	—	—	—	—	—	—	—	—	—	—	—	—

^ Collegiate Baseball ranked 40 teams in their preseason poll, but only ranked 30 teams weekly during the season.
† NCBWA ranks 30 teams in their preseason poll, but only ranks 25 teams weekly during the season.
* A new poll was not released for this week, so for comparison purposes, the previous week's ranking is inserted in this week's slot.
