= 2023 Richmond Spiders baseball team =

American college baseball season

2023 Richmond Spiders baseball
- Conference: Atlantic 10 Conference
- Record: 27–28 (14–9 A-10)
- Head coach: Tracy Woodson (10th season)
- Assistant coaches: Nate Mulberg (6th season); Chris Rinaldi (2nd season)
- Hitting coach: Josh Epstein (1st season)
- Pitching coach: Collin Radack (6th season)
- Home stadium: Malcolm U. Pitt Field

2023 Atlantic 10 Conference baseball standings
	Conf.						Overall
Team	W		L		T	PCT	W		L		T	PCT
Saint Joseph's ‍†‍‍	17	–	7	–	0	.708	28	–	24	–	1	.538
Davidson ‍‍‍	15	–	8	–	0	.652	30	–	24	–	0	.556
Saint Louis ‍‍‍	15	–	9	–	0	.625	33	–	23	–	0	.589
Dayton ‍‍‍	15	–	9	–	0	.625	26	–	34	–	0	.433
Richmond ‍‍‍	14	–	9	–	0	.609	27	–	28	–	0	.491
George Mason ‍‍‡‍^{y}	13	–	10	–	0	.565	36	–	27	–	0	.571
Rhode Island ‍‍‍	13	–	11	–	0	.542	23	–	29	–	0	.442
George Washington ‍‍‍	11	–	12	–	0	.478	21	–	34	–	0	.382
VCU ‍‍‍	11	–	13	–	0	.458	25	–	30	–	0	.455
Fordham ‍‍‍	7	–	17	–	0	.292	19	–	36	–	0	.345
UMass ‍‍‍	6	–	18	–	0	.250	14	–	35	–	0	.286
St. Bonaventure ‍‍‍	5	–	19	–	0	.208	8	–	40	–	0	.167
† – Conference champion ‡ – Tournament champion y – Invited to the NCAA tournament As of June 25, 2023; Rankings from D1Baseball

The 2023 Richmond Spiders baseball team are representing the University of Richmond during the 2023 NCAA Division I baseball season. The Spiders play their home games at Malcolm U. Pitt Field as a member of the Atlantic 10 Conference. They are led by head coach Tracy Woodson, in his tenth season with the program.

== Previous season ==
The 2022 Richmond Spiders baseball team notched a 30–26 (11–13) regular season record earning the seventh seed and in the 2022 Atlantic 10 Conference baseball tournament. During the tournament, Richmond went on a run to the championship game before losing to their crosstown rivals, VCU.

== Preseason ==
=== Preseason Atlantic 10 awards and honors ===
Outfielders Johnny Hipsman and Alden Mathes were named to the All-Atlantic 10 Preseason team.

Preseason All-Atlantic 10 Team
Player	No.	Position	Class
Alden Mathes	3	OF	RS Junior
Johnny Hipsman	5	OF	RS Senior

=== Coaches poll ===
The Atlantic 10 baseball coaches' poll was released on February 7, 2023. Richmond was picked to finish third the Atlantic 10.

Coaches' Poll
Predicted finish	Team	Points
1	Davidson	130 (5)
2	VCU	125 (4)
3	Richmond	103 (1)
4	Saint Louis	103
5	Dayton	92 (1)
6	Rhode Island	85
7	Saint Joseph's	81
8	George Mason	70 (1)
9	Fordham	52
10	George Washington	51
11	UMass	27
12	St. Bonaventure	17

== Personnel ==
=== Starters ===
Lineup
Pos.	No.	Player.	Year
C	17	Jason Neff	RS Junior
1B	26	Jake Elbeery	Sophomore
2B	12	Jared Sprague-Lott	Junior
3B	13	Jordan Jaffe	Freshman
SS	2	Mikey Kluska	Junior
LF	5	Johnny Hipsman	RS Senior
CF	3	Alden Mathes	RS Junior
RF	52	Christian Beal	Graduate
DH	4	Chase Conklin	Junior

Weekend pitching rotation
Day	No.	Player.	Year
Friday	25	Brock Weirather	Graduate
Saturday	14	Brendan Argomaniz	Graduate
Sunday	15	Jeremy Neff	RS Junior

== Schedule and results ==
2023 Richmond Spiders baseball game log
Regular season (26–26)

February (2–5)
Date	Opponent	Rank	Site/stadium	Score	Win	Loss	Save	TV	Attendance	Overall record	A10 Record
February 17	at No. 20 Alabama*		Sewell–Thomas Stadium; Tuscaloosa, AL	**L** 3–12	Grayson Hitt (1–0)	**Brock Weirather (0–1)**	—	SECN+	3,312	0–1	—
February 18	at No. 20 Alabama*		Sewell–Thomas Stadium	**L** 1–13	Ben Hess (1–0)	**Josh Willitts (0–1)**	—	SECN+	3,394	0–2	—
February 19	at No. 20 Alabama*		Sewell–Thomas Stadium	**L** 1–14^{7}	Jacob McNairy (1–0)	**Brendan Argomaniz (0–1)**	—	SECN+	3,342	0–3	—
James River Series
February 21	at William & Mary*		Plumeri Park; Williamsburg, VA	**L** 2–8	Brian Craven (1–0)	**Vincent Corso (0–1)**	Carter Lovasz (1)	FloSports	225	0–4	—
February 24	Yale*		Pitt Field; Richmond, VA	**L** 6–9	Reid Easterly (1–0)	**Brendan Argomaniz (0–2)**	Tate Evans (1)	ESPN+	653	0–5	—
February 26	Yale*		Pitt Field	**W** 11–7	**Esteban Rodriguez (1–0)**	Daniel Cohen (0–1)	**Alden Mathes (1)**	ESPN+	253	1–5	—
February 26	Yale*		Pitt Field	**W** 16–6	**Jake Michel (1–0)**	Ethan Lewis (0–1)	—	ESPN+	479	2–5	—

March (9–10)
Date	Opponent	Rank	Site/stadium	Score	Win	Loss	Save	TV	Attendance	Overall record	A10 Record
Richmond–VMI Series
March 1	at VMI*		Gray–Minor Stadium; Lexington, VA	**L** 2–10	JT Inskeep (2–0)	**Chase Topolski (0–1)**	Will Riley (2)	ESPN+	675	2–6	—
Central Virginia Classic
March 3	Fairfield*		Pitt Field	**Canceled (inclement weather)**							
March 4	Canisius*		Pitt Field	**W** 12–2	**Brock Weirather (1–1)**	Justin Guiliano (0–2)	—	ESPN+	459	3–6	—
March 5	West Virginia*		Pitt Field	**W** 7–3	**Esteban Rodriguez (2–0)**	Robby Porco (1–1)	**Alden Mathes (2)**	ESPN+	773	4–6	—
March 7	Merrimack*		Pitt Field	**W** 13–10	**Vincent Corso (1–1)**	Louis Cespedes (0–1)	—	ESPN+	255	5–6	—
March 8	Merrimack*		Pitt Field	**W** 3–2	**Chase Topolski (1–1)**	Dawson Logie (0–1)	**Jimmy Starnes (1)**	ESPN+	201	6–6	—
March 10	Rider*		Pitt Field	**L** 7–18	Alec Sachais (3–1)	**Alden Mathes (0–1)**	—	ESPN+	145	6–7	—
March 11	Rider*		Pitt Field	**L** 6–9	Danny Kirwin (3–0)	**Harrison Clifton (0–1)**	—	ESPN+	245	6–8	—
March 12	Rider*		Pitt Field	**W** 9–4	**Vincent Corso (2–1)**	Brian Young (0–3)	—	ESPN+	248	7–8	—
March 13	Princeton*		Pitt Field	**L** 3–8	Matt Scannell (1–0)	**Jake Michel (1–1)**	—	ESPN+	112	7–9	—
March 15	at Longwood*		Bolding Stadium; Farmville, VA	**L** 5–7	Kevin Warunek (1–0)	**Matthew Anderson (0–1)**	Guillermo Garcia Jr. (2)	ESPN+	168	7–10	—
March 18	Siena*		Pitt Field	**W** 6–0	**Brock Weirather (2–1)**	Arlo Marynczak (0–2)	—	ESPN+	225	8–10	—
March 18	Siena*		Pitt Field	**W** 5–1	**Brenden Argomaniz (1–2)**	Ryan Bates (1–3)	—	ESPN+	302	9–10	—
March 19	Siena*		Pitt Field	**W** 14–0	**Kyle Subers (1–0)**	Billy Rozakis (1–4)	—	ESPN+	317	10–10	—
March 22	Towson*		Pitt Field	**L** 6–12	Luis Rivera (3–1)	**Jake Michel (1–2)**	—	ESPN+	313	10–11	—
March 24	at St. John's*		Jack Kaiser Stadium; Queens, NY	**L** 5–8	Nick Cirelli (2–0)	**Harrison Clifton (0–2)**	—	BEDN	79	10–12	—
March 24	at St. John's*		Jack Kaiser Stadium	**W** 3–2	**Brenden Argomaniz (2–2)**	Joe Mascio (3–2)	**Esteban Rodriguez (1)**	BEDN	113	11–12	—
March 26	at St. John's*		Jack Kaiser Stadium	**L** 3–5	Louis Marinaro (1–0)	**Dane Armson (0–1)**	Chuck Sanzio (3)	BEDN	679	11–13	—
March 28	Longwood*		Pitt Field	**L** 2–12	Ethan Walker (1–0)	**Jake Michel (1–3)**	—	ESPN+	207	11–14	—
March 31	Saint Joseph's		Pitt Field	**L** 13–19	Will McCausland (2–1)	**Brenden Argomaniz (2–3)**	—	ESPN+	313	11–15	0–1

April (8–8)
Date	Opponent	Rank	Site/stadium	Score	Win	Loss	Save	TV	Attendance	Overall record	A10 Record
April 1	Saint Joseph's		Pitt Field	**L** 0–15	Ryan DeSanto (1–0)	**Brock Weirather (2–2)**	—	ESPN3	303	11–16	0–2
April 2	Saint Joseph's		Pitt Field	**W** 7–2	**Kyle Subers (2–0)**	Domenic Picone (1–4)	—	ESPN+	413	12–16	1–2
Piedmont Series
April 4	James Madison*		Pitt Field	**L** 8–11	Sean Culkin (1–0)	**Jake Michel (1–4)**	—	ESPN+	455	12–17	—
April 7	at George Washington		Barcroft Park; Arlington, VA	**L** 2–3	Logan Koester (3–2)	**Brenden Argomaniz (2–4)**	Max Haug (1)	ESPN+	179	12–18	1–3
April 8	at George Washington		Barcroft Park	**W** 7–3	**Harrison Clifton (1–2)**	Austin Odell (1–5)	—	ESPN3	205	13–18	2–3
April 9	at George Washington		Barcroft Park	**W** 13–3	**Kyle Subers 3–0**	Chris Kahlers (1–3)	—	ESPN+	149	14–18	3–3
April 11	at No. 7 Virginia*		Davenport Field; Charlottesville, VA	**L** 0–18	Connelly Early (7–1)	**Brian Reinke (0–1)**	—	ACCNX	2,988	14–19	—
April 14	at UMass		Earl Lorden Field; Amherst, MA	**W** 6–2	**Brock Weirather (3–2)**	Renn Lints (0–1)	—	ESPN+	90	15–19	4–3
April 15	at UMass		Earl Lorden Field	**L** 5–9	Max LeBlanc (1–2)	**Esteban Rodriguez (2–1)**	—		95	15–20	4–4
April 16	at UMass		Earl Lorden Field	**W** 15–7	**Jeremy Neff (1–0)**	Jack Steele (0–2)	—	ESPN+	95	16–20	5–4
April 19	at Towson*		Schuerholz Park; Towson, MD	**L** 10–20	Jordan Luton (1–1)	**Dane Armson (0–2)**	—	FloSports	171	16–21	—
April 21	Fordham		Pitt Field	**W** 15–8	**Brock Weirather (4–2)**	Declan Lavelle (0–4)	**Esteban Rodriguez (2)**	ESPN+	412	17–21	6–4
April 22	Fordham		Pitt Field	**L** 9–12	Aric Berg (4–2)	**Brenden Argomaniz (2–5)**	Ben Kovel (6)	ESPN3	412	17–22	6–5
April 23	Fordham		Pitt Field	**W** 7–4	**Jeremy Neff (2–0)**	Austin Sachen (0–2)	**Alden Mathes (3)**	ESPN+	315	18–22	7–5
April 29	at George Mason		Spuhler Field; Fairfax, VA	**L** 3–4	Ben Shields 6–2	**Brock Weirather (4–3)**	Chad Gartland (1)	ESPN+	89	18–23	7–6
April 29	at George Mason		Spuhler Field	**W** 7–0	**Jeremy Neff (3–0)**	Konner Eaton (1–3)	**Kyle Subers (1)**	ESPN3	213	19–23	8–6
April 30	at George Mason		Spuhler Field	**Canceled (inclement weather)**				ESPN+			

May (7–3)
Date	Opponent	Rank	Site/stadium	Score	Win	Loss	Save	TV	Attendance	Overall record	A10 Record
May 5	St. Bonaventure		Pitt Field	**W** 15–0	**Brock Weirather (5–3)**	Tripp Breen (1–2)	—	ESPN+	255	20–23	9–6
May 6	St. Bonaventure		Pitt Field	**L** 7–8	Liam Devine (2–2)	**Esteban Rodriguez (2–2)**	—	ESPN+	513	20–24	9–7
May 7	St. Bonaventure		Pitt Field	**W** 19–4	**Kyle Subers (4–0)**	Bryce Hediger (1–5)	—	ESPN+	305	21–24	10–7
May 9	at NC State*		Doak Field; Raleigh, NC	**Canceled (inclement weather)**				ESPN+			
Capital City Series
May 12	at VCU		The Diamond; Richmond, VA	**W** 16–10	**Esteban Rodriguez (3–2)**	Campbell Ellis (5–5)	—	ESPN+	739	22–24	11–7
May 13	at VCU		The Diamond	**L** 8–9	Zachary Peters (3–5)	**Brenden Argomaniz (2–6)**	—	ESPN+	441	22–25	11–8
May 14	at VCU		The Diamond	**L** 3–4	Brendan Erka (2–3)	**Alden Mathes (0–2)**	—	ESPN+	495	22–26	11–9
May 16	Norfolk State*		Pitt Field	**W** 13–3	**Harrison Clifton (2–2)**	Nolan Manzer (2–2)	—	ESPN+	219	23–26	—
May 18	Davidson		Pitt Field	**W** 11–10	**Cole Hentschel (1–0)**	Bennett Flynn (4–1)	—	ESPN+	302	24–26	12–9
May 19	Davidson		Pitt Field	**W** 7–3	**Esteban Rodriguez (4–2)**	Ryan Feczko (6–5)	—	ESPN+	333	25–26	13–9
May 20	Davidson		Pitt Field	**W** 18–2	**Brian Reince (1–1)**	Jacob Peaden (1–1)	—	ESPN+	352	26–26	14–9

Postseason (1–2)

Atlantic 10 Tournament (1–2)
Date	Opponent	Rank	Site/stadium	Score	Win	Loss	Save	TV	Attendance	Overall record	A10T Record
May 23	vs. (4) Saint Louis	(5)	The Diamond	**L** 3–6	Jackson Holmes (3–0)	**Jeremy Neff (3–1)**	Jack Weber (3)	ESPN+	250	26–27	0–1
May 24	vs. (7) Rhode Island	(5)	The Diamond	**W** 13–3	**Esteban Rodriguez (5–2)**	Trystan Levesque (6–5)	—	ESPN+		27–27	1–1
May 25	vs. (1) Saint Joseph's	(5)	The Diamond	**L** 0–4	Ryan DeSanto (4–1)	**Brock Weirather (5–4)**	—	ESPN+		27–28	1–2

Legend: = Win = Loss = Canceled
Bold = Richmond team member
"*" indicates a non-conference game.
"#" represents ranking. All rankings are based on the team's current ranking in the D1Baseball poll.
"()" represents postseason seeding in the Atlantic 10 Tournament or NCAA Regional, respectively.

== Tournaments ==
=== Atlantic 10 tournament ===
Atlantic 10 Tournament Teams
(1) Saint Joseph's Hawks	(2) Davidson Wildcats	(3) Dayton Flyers	(4) Saint Louis Billikens	(5) Richmond Spiders	(6) George Mason Patriots	(7) Rhode Island Rams

Upper round 1	Upper round 2	Upper final	Final
1	Saint Joseph's	8
4	Saint Louis	23
4	Saint Louis	6
5	Richmond	3
4	Saint Louis	6
6	George Mason	5
3	Dayton	4
6	George Mason	5
6	George Mason	15
2	Davidson	11
2	Davidson	8
7	Rhode Island	4
4	Saint Louis	1	2
6	George Mason	4	6
Lower round 1	Lower round 2	Lower round 3	Lower final
1	Saint Joseph's	4
7	Rhode Island	3	5	Richmond	0	6	George Mason	3
5	Richmond	13	1	Saint Joseph's	10	3	Dayton	2
3	Dayton	15
3	Dayton	15
2	Davidson	4

== Statistics ==
=== Team batting ===
Team	AB	Avg.	H	2B	3B	HR	RBI	BB	SO	SB
Richmond	1901	.305	579	136	9	62	385	262	366	32
Opponents	1848	.280	518	96	10	74	362	233	346	54

=== Team pitching ===
Team	IP	H	R	ER	BB	SO	SV	ERA
Richmond	469.1	518	388	339	233	446	7	6.50
Opponents	466.2	579	411	373	262	366	11	7.19

== Rankings ==
Ranking movements Legend: — = Not ranked
	Week																			
Poll	Pre	1	2	3	4	5	6	7	8	9	10	11	12	13	14	15	16	17	18	Final
Coaches'	—	—*																		
Baseball America	—																			
Collegiate Baseball^	—																			
NCBWA†	—																			
D1Baseball	—																			

^ Collegiate Baseball ranked 40 teams in their preseason poll, but only ranked 30 teams weekly during the season.
† NCBWA ranks 30 teams in their preseason poll, but only ranks 25 teams weekly during the season.
* A new poll was not released for this week, so for comparison purposes, the previous week's ranking is inserted in this week's slot.
