= 2023 Dayton Flyers baseball team =

2023 season of University of Dayton baseball team

2023 Dayton Flyers baseball
- Conference: Atlantic 10 Conference
- Record: 26–34 (15–9 A-10)
- Head coach: Jayson King (6th season)
- Assistant coaches: Pete Sass (2nd season); Nick Meyer (1st season)
- Pitching coach: Travis Ferrick (6th season)
- Home stadium: Woerner Field

2023 Atlantic 10 Conference baseball standings
	Conf.						Overall
Team	W		L		T	PCT	W		L		T	PCT
Saint Joseph's ‍†‍‍	17	–	7	–	0	.708	28	–	24	–	1	.538
Davidson ‍‍‍	15	–	8	–	0	.652	30	–	24	–	0	.556
Saint Louis ‍‍‍	15	–	9	–	0	.625	33	–	23	–	0	.589
Dayton ‍‍‍	15	–	9	–	0	.625	26	–	34	–	0	.433
Richmond ‍‍‍	14	–	9	–	0	.609	27	–	28	–	0	.491
George Mason ‍‍‡‍^{y}	13	–	10	–	0	.565	36	–	27	–	0	.571
Rhode Island ‍‍‍	13	–	11	–	0	.542	23	–	29	–	0	.442
George Washington ‍‍‍	11	–	12	–	0	.478	21	–	34	–	0	.382
VCU ‍‍‍	11	–	13	–	0	.458	25	–	30	–	0	.455
Fordham ‍‍‍	7	–	17	–	0	.292	19	–	36	–	0	.345
UMass ‍‍‍	6	–	18	–	0	.250	14	–	35	–	0	.286
St. Bonaventure ‍‍‍	5	–	19	–	0	.208	8	–	40	–	0	.167
† – Conference champion ‡ – Tournament champion y – Invited to the NCAA tournament As of June 25, 2023; Rankings from D1Baseball

The 2023 Dayton Flyers baseball team represented the University of Dayton during the 2023 NCAA Division I baseball season. The Flyers played their home games at Woerner Field as a member of the Atlantic 10 Conference. The Flyers were led by head coach Jayson King, in his 6th season at Dayton.

Dayton finished the season with a 26–34 record.

== Background ==
The 2022 season saw Dayton post a 23–27 (10–14 Atlantic 10) record. The Flyers failed to earn a berth in both the Atlantic 10 and NCAA baseball tournaments.

== Preseason ==
=== Preseason Atlantic 10 awards and honors ===
Infielder Cam Redding was named to the All-Atlantic 10 Preseason team.

Preseason All-Atlantic 10 Team
Player	No.	Position	Class
Mark Manfredi	44	SP	Senior

=== Coaches poll ===
The Atlantic 10 baseball coaches' poll was released on February 7, 2023. Dayton was picked to finish fifth the Atlantic 10.

Coaches' Poll
Predicted finish	Team	Points
1	Davidson	130 (5)
2	VCU	125 (4)
3	Richmond	103 (1)
4	Saint Louis	103
5	Dayton	92 (1)
6	Rhode Island	85
7	Saint Joseph's	81
8	George Mason	70 (1)
9	Fordham	52
10	George Washington	51
11	UMass	27
12	St. Bonaventure	17

== Personnel ==
=== Starters ===
Lineup
Pos.	No.	Player.	Year
C	16	Nolan Watson	Graduate
1B	31	Marcos Pujols	Senior
2B	1	Paxton Tomaini	Junior
3B	7	Omar Daniels	Senior
SS	8	Carlos Castillo	Junior
LF	49	Michael Adair	Junior
CF	28	Jose Martinez	Senior
RF	10	Jay Curtis	Graduate
DH	6	Ben Jones	Senior

Weekend pitching rotation
Day	No.	Player.	Year
Friday	29	Ryan Steinhauer	Senior
Saturday	25	Eli Majick	Junior
Sunday	13	Ryan Packard	Junior

== Game log ==
2023 Dayton Flyers baseball game log
Regular season (24–32)

February (0–6)
Date	Opponent	Rank	Site/stadium	Score	Win	Loss	Save	TV	Attendance	Overall record	A10 Record
February 17	at Western Kentucky*		Nick Denes Field; Bowling Green, KY	**L** 3–5	Eigenhuis (1–0)	**Steinhauer** (0–1)	Heath (1)	FBL	212	0–1	—
February 18	at Western Kentucky*		Nick Denes Field	**L** 1–6	Jones (1–0)	**Majick** (0–1)	None	FBL	411	0–2	—
February 19	at Western Kentucky*		Nick Denes Field	**L** 1–7	Terbrak (1–0)	**Packard** (0–1)	None	FBL	303	0–3	—
February 24	at No. 3 Tennessee*		Lindsey Nelson Stadium; Knoxville, TN	**L** 2–12	Dollander (1–1)	**Steinhauer** (0–2)	None	SECN+	4,264	0–4	—
February 25	at No. 3 Tennessee*		Lindsey Nelson Stadium	**L** 1–4	Burns (1–0)	**Manfredi** (0–1)	Halvorsen (1)	SECN+	4,024	0–5	—
February 26	at No. 3 Tennessee*		Lindsey Nelson Stadium	**L** 0–6	Beam (2–0)	**Espelin** (0–1)	None	SECN+	4,305	0–6	—

March (5–13)
Date	Opponent	Rank	Site/stadium	Score	Win	Loss	Save	TV	Attendance	Overall record	A10 Record
March 4	Eastern Illinois*		Woerner Field; Dayton, OH	**W** 8–7	**Majick** (1–1)	Robbins (1–1)	None		253	1–6	—
March 5	Eastern Illinois*		Woerner Field	**W** 7–6	**Johnson** (1–0)	Hanscom (0–1)	None		250	2–6	—
March 5	Eastern Illinois*		Woerner Field	**L** 1–8	Hampton (3–0)	**Espelin** (0–2)	None		206	2–7	—
March 6	Eastern Illinois*		Woerner Field	**L** 6–9	Coca (1–0)	**Packard** (0–2)	None		135	2–8	—
March 8	Miami (OH)*		Woerner Field	**W** 7–5	**Wissman** (1–0)	Sosna (0–1)	**Johnson** (1)		134	3–8	—
March 10	at No. 9 Louisville*		Jim Patterson Stadium; Louisville, KY	**L** 7–11	Hawks (4–0)	**Hattrup** (0–1)	Webster (1)	ACCNX	541	3–9	—
March 11	at No. 9 Louisville*		Jim Patterson Stadium	**L** 2–6	Koger (2–0)	**Manfredi** (0–2)	None	ACCNX	1,017	3–10	—
March 12	at No. 9 Louisville*		Jim Patterson Stadium	**L** 1–5	Phillips (1–0)	**Packard** (0–3)	Campbell (1)	ACCNX	603	3–11	—
March 14	at Akron*		Skeeles Field; Akron, OH	**W** 11–5	**Tedesco** (1–0)	Beall (0–1)	None	MAC.tv	157	4–11	—
March 17	at Ohio State*		Bill Davis Stadium; Columbus, OH	**L** 2–7	Coupet (3–1)	**Manfredi** (0–3)	None	BTN+	568	4–12	—
March 18	at Ohio State*		Bill Davis Stadium	**Canceled (inclement weather)**						4–12	—
March 19	at Ohio State*		Bill Davis Stadium	**L** 8–12	Jenkins (3–0)	**Packard** (0–4)	None	BTN+	618	4–13	—
March 21	Northern Kentucky*		Woerner Field	**W** 14–3	**Steinhauer** (1–2)	Massie (0–1)	None		175	5–13	—
March 24	at Georgetown*		Nationals Youth Academy; Washington, DC	**L** 4–7	Jensen (4–1)	**Manfredi** (0–4)	Yoder (2)	BEDN	200	5–14	—
March 25	at Georgetown*		Nationals Youth Academy	**L** 2–3	Frye (1–0)	**Wissman** (1–1)	Mead (3)	BEDN	238	5–15	—
March 26	at Georgetown*		Nationals Youth Academy	**L** 4–6	Keough (3–0)	**Bard** (0–1)	Mead (4)	BEDN	225	5–16	—
March 28	Akron*		Woerner Field	**L** 5–9	Fett (3–1)	**Espelin** (0–3)	None		118	5–17	—
March 29	Eastern Kentucky*		Woerner Field	**L** 8–14	Milburn (2–3)	**Johnson** (1–1)	None		128	5–18	—
March 31	George Washington		Woerner Field	**L** 8–11	Koester (2–2)	**Steinhauer** (1–3)	None		153	5–19	0–1

April (12–9)
Date	Opponent	Rank	Site/stadium	Score	Win	Loss	Save	TV	Attendance	Overall record	A10 Record
April 1	George Washington		Woerner Field	**W** 8–6	**Manfredi** (1–4)	Brennan (1–1)	None		166	6–19	1–1
April 2	George Washington		Woerner Field	**W** 9–5	**Majick** (2–1)	Kahler (1–2)	None		353	7–19	2–1
April 4	at No. 10 Kentucky*		Kentucky Proud Park; Lexington, KY	**L** 6–13	Cotto (1–0)	**Packard** (0–5)	None	SECN+	3,274	7–20	—
April 5	at Toledo*		Scott Park Baseball Complex; Toledo, OH	**Canceled (inclement weather)**						7–20	—
April 7	at George Mason		Spuhler Field; Fairfax, VA	**W** 6–5	**Packard** (1–5)	Mracna (1–1)	**Bard** (1)	ESPN+	193	8–20	3–1
April 8	at George Mason		Spuhler Field	**L** 0–11	Gartland (3–2)	**Majick** (2–2)	None	ESPN+	320	8–21	3–2
April 9	at George Mason		Spuhler Field	**W** 6–5	**Wissman** (2–1)	Posey (1–2)	**Zapka** (1)	ESPN+	187	9–21	4–2
April 11	at Northern Kentucky*		Bill Aker Baseball Complex; Highland Heights, KY	**L** 9–12	Werrmann (5–1)	**Packard** (1–6)	Maniglia (3)	ESPN+	89	9–22	—
April 12	Purdue Fort Wayne*		Woerner Field	**W** 8–3	**Claybourne** (1–0)	Hayden (0–3)	None	ESPN+/GCSN	107	10–22	—
April 14	at Davidson		T. Henry Wilson Jr. Field; Davidson, NC	**W** 8–4	**Manfredi** (2–4)	Schomberg (5–2)	**Zapka** (2)	ESPN+	247	11–22	5–2
April 15	at Davidson		T. Henry Wilson Jr. Field	**L** 4–5	Feczko (4–3)	**Majick** (2–3)	Flynn (3)	ESPN+	566	11–23	5–3
April 16	at Davidson		T. Henry Wilson Jr. Field	**L** 3–8	Peaden (1–0)	**Steinhauer** (1–4)	None	ESPN+	347	11–24	5–4
Dayton Series
April 18	vs. Wright State*		Day Air Ballpark; Dayton, OH	**W** 8–3	**Brush** (1–0)	Haught (3–2)	None	GCSN	6,743	12–24	—
April 18	at Ohio State*		Bill Davis Stadium; Columbus, OH	**L** 7–8	Clegg (1–0)	**Johnson** (1–2)	Jenkins (2)	BTN+	894	12–25	—
April 21	Saint Louis		Woerner Field	**W** 7–6	**Zapka** (1–0)	Bell (2–2)	None	ESPN+/GCSN	445	13–25	6–4
April 22	Saint Louis		Woerner Field	**L** 10–12	Cherico (3–1)	**Packard** (1–7)	Evan Gray (1)	GCSN	445	13–26	6–5
April 23	Saint Louis		Woerner Field	**W** 2–1	**Baker** (1–0)	Fremion (2–2)	**Zapka** (3)	GCSN	260	14–26	7–5
April 25	Toledo*		Woerner Field	**L** 3–9	McAninch (2–1)	**Brush** (1–1)	None		97	14–27	—
April 25	at Purdue Fort Wayne*		Mastodon Field; Fort Wayne, IN	**W** 11–10	**Claybourne** (2–0)	Reid (2–3)	None		118	15–27	—
April 28	at Rhode Island		Bill Beck Field; Kingston, RI	**W** 9–3	**Manfredi** (3–4)	Sposato (2–5)	**Wissman** (1)		127	16–27	8–5
April 29	at Rhode Island		Bill Beck Field	**W** 6–2	**Majick** (3–3)	Levesque (5–3)	None		109	17–27	9–5
April 30	at Rhode Island		Bill Beck Field	**L** 6–11	Perry (4–4)	**Bard** (0–2)	None		62	17–28	9–6

May (7–4)
Date	Opponent	Rank	Site/stadium	Score	Win	Loss	Save	TV	Attendance	Overall record	A10 Record
May 5	Saint Joseph's		Woerner Field	**W** 16–9	Zapka (2–0)	Falco (2–1)	None	ESPN+	163	18–28	10–6
May 6	Saint Joseph's		Woerner Field	**L** 5–7	DeSanto (2–1)	**Majick** (3–4)	Stetzar (5)	ESPN+	163	18–29	10–7
May 7	Saint Joseph's		Woerner Field	**L** 2–15	Picone (4–5)	**Steinhauer** (1–5)	None	ESPN+	138	18–30	10–8
May 9	at Wright State*		Nischwitz Stadium; Dayton, OH	**L** 2–11	Simpson (1–0)	**Gatti** (0–1)	None	ESPN+	579	18–31	—
May 10	Butler*		Woerner Field	**W** 7–6	**Tedesco** (2–0)	Vore (1–5)	**Hattrup** (1)	ESPN+	327	19–31	—
May 11	St. Bonaventure		Woerner Field	**W** 17–3	**Bard** (1–2)	Roggenburk (0–4)	None	ESPN+	139	20–31	11–8
May 12	St. Bonaventure		Woerner Field	**W** 5–2	**Majick** (4–4)	Watts (3–6)	**Zapka** (4)	ESPN+	139	21–31	12–8
May 13	St. Bonaventure		Woerner Field	**W** 3–2	**Wissman** (3–1)	O'Connell (1–2)	None	GCSN	188	22–31	13–8
May 18	at UMass		Earl Lorden Field; Amherst, MA	**W** 32–14	**Bard** (2–2)	Belliveau (2–2)	None	ESPN+	90	23–31	14–8
May 19	at UMass		Earl Lorden Field	**W** 8–5	**Wissman** (4–1)	Perrett (1–7)	**Hattrup** (2)	ESPN+	100	24–31	15–8
May 20	at UMass		Earl Lorden Field	**L** 6–13	Steele (1–5)	**Wilson** (0–1)	None	ESPN+	100	24–32	15–9

Postseason (2–2)

Atlantic 10 Tournament (2–2)
Date	Opponent	Rank	Site/stadium	Score	Win	Loss	Save	TV	Attendance	Overall record	A10T Record
Winner's bracket
May 23	vs. (6) George Mason	(3)	The Diamond	**L** 4–5^{11}	Mracna (4–1)	**Bard** (2–3)	Lamere (1)	ESPN+	877	24–33	0–1
Consolation bracket
May 24	vs. (2) Davidson	(3)	The Diamond	**W** 15–4	**Majick** (5–4)	Peaden (1–2)	None	ESPN+	835	25–33	1–1
May 25	vs. (1) Saint Joseph's	(3)	The Diamond	**W** 15–10	**Bard** (3–3)	Picone (5–6)	None	ESPN+	703	26–33	2–1
May 26	vs. (6) George Mason	(3)	The Diamond	**L** 2–3	Smith (1–0)	**Wissman** (4–2)	Gartland (2)	ESPN+	703	26–34	2–2

Legend: = Win = Loss = Canceled
Bold = Dayton team member
"*" indicates a non-conference game.
"#" represents ranking. All rankings are based on the team's current ranking in the D1Baseball poll.
"()" represents postseason seeding in the Atlantic 10 Tournament or NCAA Regional, respectively.

== Tournaments ==
=== Atlantic 10 tournament ===
Atlantic 10 Tournament Teams
(1) Saint Joseph's Hawks	(2) Davidson Wildcats	(3) Dayton Flyers	(4) Saint Louis Billikens	(5) Richmond Spiders	(6) George Mason Patriots	(7) Rhode Island Rams

Upper round 1	Upper round 2	Upper final	Final
1	Saint Joseph's	8
4	Saint Louis	23
4	Saint Louis	6
5	Richmond	3
4	Saint Louis	6
6	George Mason	5
3	Dayton	4
6	George Mason	5
6	George Mason	15
2	Davidson	11
2	Davidson	8
7	Rhode Island	4
4	Saint Louis	1	2
6	George Mason	4	6
Lower round 1	Lower round 2	Lower round 3	Lower final
1	Saint Joseph's	4
7	Rhode Island	3	5	Richmond	0	6	George Mason	3
5	Richmond	13	1	Saint Joseph's	10	3	Dayton	2
3	Dayton	15
3	Dayton	15
2	Davidson	4

== Statistics ==
=== Team batting ===
Team	AB	Avg.	H	2B	3B	HR	RBI	BB	SO	SB
Dayton	0	.000	0	0	0	0	0	0	0	0
Opponents	0	.000	0	0	0	0	0	0	0	0

=== Team pitching ===
Team	IP	H	R	ER	BB	SO	SV	ERA
Dayton	0.0	0	0	0	0	0	0	0.00
Opponents	0.0	0	0	0	0	0	0	0.00

== Rankings ==
Ranking movements Legend: — = Not ranked
	Week																			
Poll	Pre	1	2	3	4	5	6	7	8	9	10	11	12	13	14	15	16	17	18	Final
Coaches'	—	—*	—	—	—	—	—	—	—											
Baseball America	—	—	—	—	—	—	—	—	—											
Collegiate Baseball^	—	—	—	—	—	—	—	—	—											
NCBWA†	—	—	—	—	—	—	—	—	—											
D1Baseball	—	—	—	—	—	—	—	—	—											

^ Collegiate Baseball ranked 40 teams in their preseason poll, but only ranked 30 teams weekly during the season.
† NCBWA ranks 30 teams in their preseason poll, but only ranks 25 teams weekly during the season.
* A new poll was not released for this week, so for comparison purposes, the previous week's ranking is inserted in this week's slot.
