= 2023 Saint Louis Billikens baseball team =

American college baseball season

2023 Saint Louis Billikens baseball
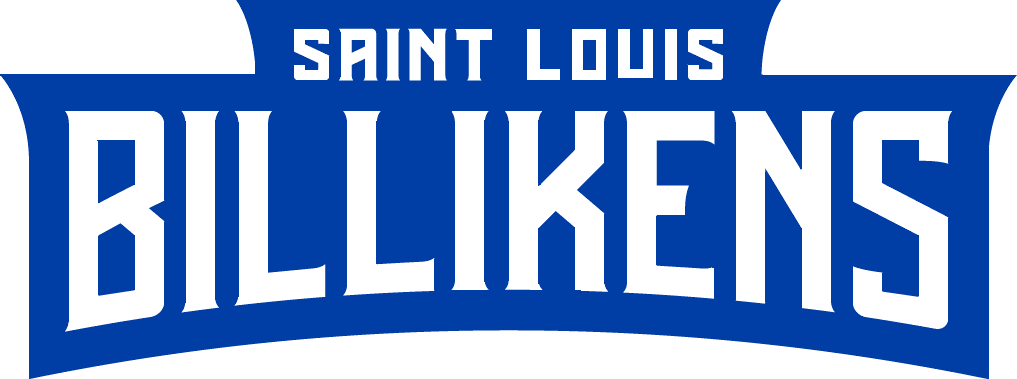
- Conference: Atlantic 10 Conference
- Record: 33–23 (15–9 A-10)
- Head coach: Darin Hendrickson (16th season)
- Assistant coaches: Logan Moon (3rd season); Adam Revelette (2nd season); Jason Eary (1st season)
- Home stadium: Billiken Sports Center

2023 Atlantic 10 Conference baseball standings
	Conf.						Overall
Team	W		L		T	PCT	W		L		T	PCT
Saint Joseph's ‍†‍‍	17	–	7	–	0	.708	28	–	24	–	1	.538
Davidson ‍‍‍	15	–	8	–	0	.652	30	–	24	–	0	.556
Saint Louis ‍‍‍	15	–	9	–	0	.625	33	–	23	–	0	.589
Dayton ‍‍‍	15	–	9	–	0	.625	26	–	34	–	0	.433
Richmond ‍‍‍	14	–	9	–	0	.609	27	–	28	–	0	.491
George Mason ‍‍‡‍^{y}	13	–	10	–	0	.565	36	–	27	–	0	.571
Rhode Island ‍‍‍	13	–	11	–	0	.542	23	–	29	–	0	.442
George Washington ‍‍‍	11	–	12	–	0	.478	21	–	34	–	0	.382
VCU ‍‍‍	11	–	13	–	0	.458	25	–	30	–	0	.455
Fordham ‍‍‍	7	–	17	–	0	.292	19	–	36	–	0	.345
UMass ‍‍‍	6	–	18	–	0	.250	14	–	35	–	0	.286
St. Bonaventure ‍‍‍	5	–	19	–	0	.208	8	–	40	–	0	.167
† – Conference champion ‡ – Tournament champion y – Invited to the NCAA tournament As of June 25, 2023; Rankings from D1Baseball

The 2023 Saint Louis Billikens baseball team represented the Saint Louis University during the 2023 NCAA Division I baseball season. The Billikens played their home games at Billiken Sports Center as a member of the Atlantic 10 Conference. They were led by head coach Darin Hendrickson, in his 16th season with the program.

Saint Louis finished the season with a 33–23 (15–9) record. They reached the finals of the 2023 Atlantic 10 Conference baseball tournament where they lost to George Mason.

== Previous season ==
The 2022 Saint Louis Billikens baseball team notched a 29–24 (14–9) regular season record earning the third seed and in the 2022 Atlantic 10 Conference baseball tournament. During the tournament, Saint Louis went 1–2 in the tournament.

== Preseason ==
=== Preseason Atlantic 10 awards and honors ===
Infielder Cam Redding was named to the All-Atlantic 10 Preseason team.

Preseason All-Atlantic 10 Team
Player	No.	Position	Class
Cam Redding	28	INF	Senior

=== Coaches poll ===
The Atlantic 10 baseball coaches' poll was released on February 7, 2023. Saint Louis was picked to finish fourth the Atlantic 10.

Coaches' Poll
Predicted finish	Team	Points
1	Davidson	130 (5)
2	VCU	125 (4)
3	Richmond	103 (1)
4	Saint Louis	103
5	Dayton	92 (1)
6	Rhode Island	85
7	Saint Joseph's	81
8	George Mason	70 (1)
9	Fordham	52
10	George Washington	51
11	UMass	27
12	St. Bonaventure	17

== Personnel ==
=== Starters ===
Lineup
Pos.	No.	Player.	Year
C	20	Cody Jansen	Senior
1B	13	Cameron Swanger	Senior
2B	2	Ethan Sitzman	Junior
3B	12	Dominic Cusumano	Senior
SS	5	Easton Richter	Freshman
LF	15	Tyler Fogarty	Junior
CF	1	Hayden Moore	Sophomore
RF	9	Patrick Clohisy	Sophomore
DH	11	Cole Smith	Junior

Weekend pitching rotation
Day	No.	Player.	Year
Friday	16	Dawson Smith	Junior
Saturday	37	Luke Gasser	Junior
Sunday	29	Jack Weber	Sophomore

== Game log ==
2023 Saint Louis Billikens baseball game log (33–23)
Regular season (30–21)

February (4–3)
Date	Opponent	Rank	Site/stadium	Score	Win	Loss	Save	TV	Attendance	Overall record	A10 Record
February 17	vs. Marshall*		Hoover Metropolitan Stadium; Hoover, AL	**L** 4–11	Blevins (1–0)	**Smith** (0–1)	None		75	0–1	—
February 18	vs. Marshall*		Hoover Metropolitan Stadium	**L** 4–8	Harlow (1–0)	**Gasser** (0–1)	Capuano (1)		75	0–2	—
February 19	vs. Marshall*		Hoover Metropolitan Stadium	**L** 5–10	Capuano (1–0)	**Weber** (0–1)	None		100	0–3	—
February 24	vs. Minnesota*		City of Palms Park; Fort Myers, FL	**W** 6–3	**Redding** (1–0)	Litman (0–1)	None		326	1–3	—
February 25	vs. Minnesota*		City of Palms Park	**W** 8–3	**Cherico** (1–0)	Malec (0–2)	None		345	2–3	—
February 26	vs. Minnesota*		City of Palms Park	**W** 16–9	**Chaffin** (1–0)	Klassen (0–2)	None		359	3–3	—
February 28	at Southern Illinois*		Itchy Jones Stadium; Carbondale, IL	**W** 11–3	**Smith** (1–1)	Combs (0–1)	None		415	4–3	—

March (9–7)
Date	Opponent	Rank	Site/stadium	Score	Win	Loss	Save	TV	Attendance	Overall record	A10 Record
March 3	St. Thomas (MN)*		Billiken Sports Center; St. Louis, MO	**W** 4–1	**Weber** (1–1)	Klick (0–1)	None		105	5–3	—
March 4	St. Thomas (MN)*		Billiken Sports Center	**W** 6–5	**Graf** (1–0)	Marsh (0–1)	None		134	6–3	—
March 5	St. Thomas (MN)*		Billiken Sports Center	**W** 5–2	**Chaffin** (2–0)	Esch (1–1)	**Fremion** (1)		126	7–3	—
March 7	at Lindenwood*		Lou Brock Stadium; St. Charles, MO	**W** 14–9	**Downard** (1–0)	James (0–3)	None		89	8–3	—
March 10	Northwestern*		Billiken Sports Center	**W** 16–6	**Thomson** (1–0)	McClure (0–3)	None		65	9–3	—
March 11	Northwestern*		Billiken Sports Center	**W** 14–5	**Holmes** (1–0)	Dickson (0–1)	None		89	10–3	—
March 12	Northwestern*		Billiken Sports Center	**Canceled (inclement weather)**						10–3	—
March 14	Southern Indiana*		Billiken Sports Center	**L** 2–10	Sweeney (1–0)	**Chaffin** (2–1)	None		74	10–4	—
March 15	South Dakota State*		Billiken Sports Center	**L** 1–5	Goble (1–0)	**Cherico** (1–1)	Bourassa (3)		49	10–5	—
March 17	vs. Lamar*		USA Baseball Complex; Millington, TN	**W** 8–7	**Hendrickson** (1–0)	Cleveland (3–2)	None		130	11–5	—
March 18	vs. Lamar*		USA Baseball Complex	**W** 6–5^{10}	**Bell** (1–0)	Cole (0–1)	None		65	12–5	—
March 19	vs. Lamar*		USA Baseball Complex	**Canceled (inclement weather)**						12–5	—
March 21	Missouri State*		Billiken Sports Center	**Canceled (inclement weather)**						12–5	—
March 22	Eastern Illinois*		Billiken Sports Center	**L** 0–2	Laxner (2–0)	**Fremion** (0–1)	Robbins (1)		100	12–6	—
March 24	at San Jose State*		Excite Ballpark; San Jose, CA	**L** 4–11	Clark (1–0)	**Litman** (1–1)	None	ESPN+	316	12–7	—
March 25	at San Jose State*		Excite Ballpark	**L** 6–7^{10}	Jansen (1–1)	**Bell** (1–1)	None	ESPN+	120	12–8	—
March 26	at San Jose State*		Excite Ballpark	**L** 3–4^{11}	White (4–1)	**Downard** (1–1)	None	ESPN+	316	12–9	—
March 28	SIUE*		Billiken Sports Center	**L** 12–14	Milsap (1–0)	**Gasser** (0–2)	None		128	12–10	—
March 31	UMass		Billiken Sports Center	**W** 9–4	**Litman** (2–1)	Pawloski (1–1)	None		113	13–10	1–0

April (12–6)
Date	Opponent	Rank	Site/stadium	Score	Win	Loss	Save	TV	Attendance	Overall record	A10 Record
April 1	UMass		Billiken Sports Center	**W** 7–6	**Cherico** (2–1)	Harrigan (0–2)	None		142	14–10	2–0
April 2	UMass		Billiken Sports Center	**W** 11–1	**Chaffin** (3–1)	Steele (0–1)	None		122	15–10	3–0
April 4	at SIUE*		Roy E. Lee Field; Edwardsville, IL	**W** 19–14	**Fremion** (1–1)	Smith (0–1)	None		156	16–10	—
April 6	at St. Bonaventure		Fred Handler Park; Olean, NY	**W** 13–3	**Litman** (3–1)	Roggenburk (0–2)	None	ESPN+	172	17–10	4–0
April 7	at St. Bonaventure		Fred Handler Park	**L** 7–10	Watts (2–3)	**Weber** (1–2)	Devine (4)	ESPN+	150	17–11	4–1
April 8	at St. Bonaventure		Fred Handler Park	**W** 7–5	**Bell** (2–1)	Hediger (0–4)	**Cherico** (1)	ESPN+	200	18–11	5–1
April 11	at Southern Indiana*		USI Baseball Field; Evansville, IN	**W** 16–11	**Fremion** (2–1)	Stamm (0–1)	None		307	19–11	—
April 14	Saint Joseph's		Billiken Sports Center	**W** 4–2	**Litman** (4–1)	McCausland (3–2)	**Bell** (1)	ESPN+	180	20–11	6–1
April 15	Saint Joseph's		Billiken Sports Center	**W** 10–6	**Chaffin** (4–1)	DeSanto (1–1)	**Weber** (1)	ESPN+	201	21–11	7–1
April 16	Saint Joseph's		Billiken Sports Center	**W** 14–8	**Holmes** (2–0)	Picone (1–5)	None	ESPN+	121	22–11	8–1
April 18	at Lindenwood*		Lou Brock Stadium	**L** 8–13	Stice (2–4)	**Downard** (1–2)	None		79	22–12	—
April 21	at Dayton		Woerner Field; Dayton, OH	**L** 6–7^{10}	Zapka (1–0)	**Bell** (2–2)	None	GCSN	445	22–13	8–2
April 22	at Dayton		Woerner Field	**W** 12–10	**Cherico** (3–1)	Packard (1–7)	**Gray** (1)	GCSN	445	23–13	9–2
April 23	at Dayton		Woerner Field	**L** 1–2	Baker (1–0)	**Fremion** (2–2)	Zapka (3)	GCSN	260	23–14	9–3
April 25	Western Illinois*		Woerner Field	**W** 8–5	**Gray** (1–0)	Alexander (0–1)	**Bell** (2)		133	24–14	—
April 28	at VCU		The Diamond; Richmond, VA	**L** 6–10	Erka (1–2)	**Gray** (1–1)	None	ESPN+	349	24–15	9–4
April 29	at VCU		The Diamond	**W** 10–5	**Weber** (2–2)	Ellis (5–4)	None	ESPN+	350	25–15	10–4
April 30	at VCU		The Diamond	**L** 6–7^{11}	Curley (2–2)	**Dumont** (0–1)	None	ESPN+	480	25–16	10–5

May (5–5)
Date	Opponent	Rank	Site/stadium	Score	Win	Loss	Save	TV	Attendance	Overall record	A10 Record
May 5	George Washington		Billiken Sports Center	**L** 6–8	Koester (5–3)	**Litman** (4–2)	Odell (1)	ESPN+	144	25–17	10–6
May 6	George Washington		Billiken Sports Center	**W** 9–6	**Chaffin** (5–1)	Brennan (2–3)	**Weber** (2)	ESPN+	201	26–17	11–6
May 7	George Washington		Billiken Sports Center	**W** 9–8^{10}	**Bell** (3–2)	Foltz (1–3)	None	ESPN+	198	27–17	12–6
May 12	at Davidson		T. Henry Wilson Jr. Field; Davidson, NC	**L** 2–11	Schomberg (7–2)	**Litman** (4–3)	Flynn (4)		447	27–18	12–7
May 13	at Davidson		T. Henry Wilson Jr. Field	**L** 11–12	Shedleski (1–1)	**Bell** (3–3)	None		449	27–19	12–8
May 14	at Davidson		T. Henry Wilson Jr. Field	**L** 11–14	Fix (3–2)	**Holmes** (2–1)	None		505	27–20	12–9
May 16	Lindenwood*		Billiken Sports Center	**L** 1–9	Walsh (2–4)	**Smith** (1–2)	None	ESPN+	276	27–21	—
May 18	Fordham		Billiken Sports Center	**W** 9–2	**Litman** (5–3)	Lavelle (1–6)	None	ESPN+	233	28–21	13–9
May 19	Fordham		Billiken Sports Center	**W** 8–6	**Downard** (2–2)	Kovel (3–3)	**Bell** (3)	ESPN+	209	29–21	14–9
May 20	Fordham		Billiken Sports Center	**W** 14–4	**Hendrikson** (2–0)	Simeone (0–3)	None	ESPN+	228	30–21	15–9

Postseason (3–2)

Atlantic 10 Tournament (3–2)
Date	Opponent	Rank	Site/stadium	Score	Win	Loss	Save	TV	Attendance	Overall record	A10T Record
May 23	vs. (5) Richmond	(4)	The Diamond	**W** 6–3	**Holmes** (3–0)	Neff (3–1)	**Weber** (3)	ESPN+	250	31–21	1–0
May 24	vs. (1) Saint Joseph's	(4)	The Diamond	**W** 23–8	**Litman** (6–3)	McCausland (5–3)	None	ESPN+	325	32–21	2–0
May 25	vs. (6) George Mason	(4)	The Diamond	**W** 6–5	**Weber** (3–2)	Lamere (3–1)	**Bell** (4)	ESPN+	258	33–21	3–0
May 26	vs. (6) George Mason	(4)	The Diamond	**L** 1–4	Menaker (1–1)	**Smith** (1–3)	Shields (1)	ESPN+	817	33–22	3–1
May 27	vs. (6) George Mason	(4)	The Diamond	**L** 2–6	Stewart (2–2)	**Holmes** (3–2)	None	ESPN+	817	33–23	3–2

Legend: = Win = Loss = Canceled
Bold = Saint Louis team member
"*" indicates a non-conference game.
"#" represents ranking. All rankings are based on the team's current ranking in the D1Baseball poll.
"()" represents postseason seeding in the Atlantic 10 Tournament or NCAA Regional, respectively.

== Tournaments ==
=== Atlantic 10 tournament ===
Atlantic 10 Tournament Teams
(1) Saint Joseph's Hawks	(2) Davidson Wildcats	(3) Dayton Flyers	(4) Saint Louis Billikens	(5) Richmond Spiders	(6) George Mason Patriots	(7) Rhode Island Rams

Upper round 1	Upper round 2	Upper final	Final
1	Saint Joseph's	8
4	Saint Louis	23
4	Saint Louis	6
5	Richmond	3
4	Saint Louis	6
6	George Mason	5
3	Dayton	4
6	George Mason	5
6	George Mason	15
2	Davidson	11
2	Davidson	8
7	Rhode Island	4
4	Saint Louis	1	2
6	George Mason	4	6
Lower round 1	Lower round 2	Lower round 3	Lower final
1	Saint Joseph's	4
7	Rhode Island	3	5	Richmond	0	6	George Mason	3
5	Richmond	13	1	Saint Joseph's	10	3	Dayton	2
3	Dayton	15
3	Dayton	15
2	Davidson	4

== Statistics ==
=== Team batting ===
Team	AB	Avg.	H	2B	3B	HR	RBI	BB	SO	SB
Saint Louis	1,176	.293	334	68	7	35	251	159	247	50
Opponents	1,177	.287	338	59	3	18	182	154	221	30

=== Team pitching ===
Team	IP	H	R	ER	BB	SO	SV	ERA
Saint Louis	298.1	338	210	166	154	221	4	5.01
Opponents	291.1	334	272	245	159	247	4	7.57

== Rankings ==
Ranking movements Legend: — = Not ranked
	Week																			
Poll	Pre	1	2	3	4	5	6	7	8	9	10	11	12	13	14	15	16	17	18	Final
Coaches'	—	—*	—	—																
Baseball America	—	—	—	—																
Collegiate Baseball^	—	—	—	—																
NCBWA†	—	—	—	—																
D1Baseball	—	—	—	—																

^ Collegiate Baseball ranked 40 teams in their preseason poll, but only ranked 30 teams weekly during the season.
† NCBWA ranks 30 teams in their preseason poll, but only ranks 25 teams weekly during the season.
* A new poll was not released for this week, so for comparison purposes, the previous week's ranking is inserted in this week's slot.
