= Rucker Taylor =

American baseball player and coach (born 1984)

Current position
- Title: Head coach
- Team: Davidson
- Conference: Atlantic 10
- Record: 218–171 (.560)

Biographical details
- Born: June 3, 1984 (age 42); Fairhope, Alabama, U.S.
- Education: Vanderbilt University; Samford University

Playing career
- 2003–2006: Vanderbilt
- Position: Second baseman / Shortstop

Coaching career (HC unless noted)
- 2007–2012: Samford (Asst.)
- 2013–2018: Davidson (Asst.)
- 2019–present: Davidson

Head coaching record
- Overall: 218–171 (.560)
- Tournaments: A10: 8–11–0 (.421)

Accomplishments and honors

Championships
- Atlantic 10 (2022)

Awards
- Atlantic 10 Coach of the Year (2022)

Rucker Taylor (born June 3, 1984) is an American college baseball coach, currently serving as head coach of the Davidson Wildcats baseball team. Taylor played baseball for the Vanderbilt Commodores baseball team while obtaining a degree. He achieved his master's degree while coaching for the Samford Bulldogs baseball team.

== Coaching career ==
Taylor began coaching as a graduate assistant for the Samford Bulldogs baseball team in 2007.

On August 1, 2012, Taylor joined Dick Cooke's coaching staff with the Davidson Wildcats baseball team. Taylor served as the major catalyst for turning Davidson into a winning program, as they have finished with a winning record in 5 of his 6 seasons as coach.

In February 2018, Taylor was named the successor to Cooke beginning the 2019 season.

== Head coaching record ==
Record table
Season	Team	Overall	Conference	Standing	Postseason
Davidson Wildcats (Atlantic 10 Conference) (2019–present)
2019	Davidson	29–22	14–6	2nd	Atlantic 10 Tournament
2020	Davidson	13–3	0–0		Season canceled due to COVID-19
2021	Davidson	27–24	11–13	4th (South)	
2022	Davidson	43–13	20–4	1st	Atlantic 10 Tournament
2023	Davidson	30–24	15–8	2nd	Atlantic 10 Tournament
2024	Davidson	24–28	10–14	T-9th	
2025	Davidson	27–29	18–12	4th	Atlantic 10 Tournament
2026	Davidson	25–28	16–14	6th	Atlantic 10 Tournament
Davidson:		218–171 (.560)	104–71 (.594)		
Total:		218–171 (.560)			
National champion Postseason invitational champion Conference regular season champion Conference regular season and conference tournament champion Division regular season champion Division regular season and conference tournament champion Conference tournament champion

== See also ==
- List of current NCAA Division I baseball coaches
