= 2023 George Mason Patriots baseball team =

American college baseball season

2023 George Mason Patriots baseball

Atlantic 10 tournament champions

Winston-Salem Regional, 2–2
- Conference: Atlantic 10 Conference
- Record: 34–25 (13–11 A-10)
- Head coach: Shawn Camp (1st season)
- Assistant coaches: Ryan Terrill (2nd season); Kyle Wrighte (2nd season); Matt Marsh (1st season)
- Pitching coach: Ryan Ricci (1st season)
- Home stadium: Spuhler Field

2023 Atlantic 10 Conference baseball standings
	Conf.						Overall
Team	W		L		T	PCT	W		L		T	PCT
Saint Joseph's ‍†‍‍	17	–	7	–	0	.708	28	–	24	–	1	.538
Davidson ‍‍‍	15	–	8	–	0	.652	30	–	24	–	0	.556
Saint Louis ‍‍‍	15	–	9	–	0	.625	33	–	23	–	0	.589
Dayton ‍‍‍	15	–	9	–	0	.625	26	–	34	–	0	.433
Richmond ‍‍‍	14	–	9	–	0	.609	27	–	28	–	0	.491
George Mason ‍‍‡‍^{y}	13	–	10	–	0	.565	36	–	27	–	0	.571
Rhode Island ‍‍‍	13	–	11	–	0	.542	23	–	29	–	0	.442
George Washington ‍‍‍	11	–	12	–	0	.478	21	–	34	–	0	.382
VCU ‍‍‍	11	–	13	–	0	.458	25	–	30	–	0	.455
Fordham ‍‍‍	7	–	17	–	0	.292	19	–	36	–	0	.345
UMass ‍‍‍	6	–	18	–	0	.250	14	–	35	–	0	.286
St. Bonaventure ‍‍‍	5	–	19	–	0	.208	8	–	40	–	0	.167
† – Conference champion ‡ – Tournament champion y – Invited to the NCAA tournament As of June 25, 2023; Rankings from D1Baseball

The 2023 George Mason Patriots baseball team represented George Mason University during the 2023 NCAA Division I baseball season. The Patriots play their home games at Spuhler Field as a member of the Atlantic 10 Conference. They were led by head coach Shawn Camp, in his fourth season at Mason, and his first as a head coach.

This was the first season since 1981 that Bill Brown did not coach George Mason. Brown retired at the conclusion of 2022 season.

Mason won the Atlantic 10 baseball tournament and went 2–2 in the Winston-Salem Regional.

== Previous season ==
The 2022 team finished the season with a 22–33 (13–11 Atlantic 10) record, and finished in fifth place of the Atlantic 10. They went 1–2 in the 2022 Atlantic 10 Conference baseball tournament.

== Preseason ==
=== Preseason Atlantic 10 awards and honors ===
Infielder Cam Redding was named to the All-Atlantic 10 Preseason team.

Preseason All-Atlantic 10 Team
Player	No.	Position	Class
Ryan Peterson		SP	
South Trimble		2B	

=== Coaches poll ===
The Atlantic 10 baseball coaches' poll was released on February 7, 2023. George Mason was picked to finish eighth in the Atlantic 10.

Coaches' Poll
Predicted finish	Team	Points
1	Davidson	130 (5)
2	VCU	125 (4)
3	Richmond	103 (1)
4	Saint Louis	103
5	Dayton	92 (1)
6	Rhode Island	85
7	Saint Joseph's	81
8	George Mason	70 (1)
9	Fordham	52
10	George Washington	51
11	UMass	27
12	St. Bonaventure	17

== Personnel ==
=== Starters ===
Lineup
Pos.	No.	Player.	Year
C		Connor Dykstra	
1B		South Trimble	
2B		Brett Stallings	
3B		Mark Trotta	
SS		Carsen Pracht	
LF		James Quinn-Irons	
CF		Jordan Smith	
RF		Derek Wood	
DH		Brady Powell	

Weekend pitching rotation
Day	No.	Player.	Year
Friday		Ben Shields	
Saturday		Ryan Peterson	
Sunday		Chad Gartland	

=== Roster ===
2023 George Mason Patriots baseball roster
Pitchers: 7 - Jared Lyons - Senior; 13 - Chris Ruckdeschel - Graduate; 15 - Jackson Baird - Freshman; 38 - Stephen Restuccio - Sophomore; 40 - Thomas Little - Freshman; 42 - Diego Barrett - Freshman; 43 - Ben Shields - Graduate; 45 - Christian Mracna - Sophomore; 46 - Jalen Grant - Freshman	Catchers: 10 - Tyler Cotten - Freshman; Infielders: 6 - Daniel Brooks - Graduate; 9 - Brett Stallings - Junior; 11 - Carsen Pracht - Freshman	Outfielders: 2 - Jordan Smith - Sophomore; 8 - Brett Ahalt - Freshman; 12 - Kamron Smith - Graduate; Utility: 5 - Danny Hosley - Graduate

=== Coaching staff ===
2023 George Mason Patriots baseball coaching staff
Name	Position	Seasons at Mason	Alma mater
Shawn Camp	Head coach	4	George Mason University (1997)
Ryan Terrill	Assistant Coach	2	Liberty University (2003)
Ryan Ricci	Pitching Coach	1	George Mason University (2018)
Matt Marsh	Assistant Coach	1	Loyola University Maryland (2015)
Kyle Wrighte	Director of Player Development	2	College of William & Mary (2019)
Hannah Stapleford	Athletic Trainer	3	Longwood University (2017)
Matt Collins	Student Manager	2	George Mason University (2024)

== Offseason ==
=== Signing Day Recruits ===
The following players signed National Letter of Intents to play for George Mason in 2023.

Player	Hometown	High School
Pitchers
Owen Stewart	Elmira, New York	Notre Dame (NY)
Ryan Edmonds	Severn, Maryland	Archbishop Curley
Chris Fidanza	New Fairfield, Connecticut	Pro5 Baseball Academy
Connor Knox	Manassas, Virginia	Charles J. Colgan
Logan Rumberg	Okotoks, Alberta	Foothills Composite
Michael Salina	Webster, New York	Webster Schroeder
Tyler Herkey	Cornelius, North Carolina	Southlake Christian
Hitters
Evan Blanchard	Manassas, Virginia	Charles J. Colgan
Brady Powell	Lusby, Maryland	Patuxent
Bennett Shealor	Blacksburg, Virginia	Blacksburg
James Quinn-Irons	Reston, Virginia	South Lakes
A.J. Martin	Olney, Maryland	St. John's College

== Game log ==
2023 George Mason Patriots baseball game log (36–27)
Regular season (29–24)

February (2–5)
Date	Time (ET)	TV	Opponent	Rank	Stadium	Score	Win	Loss	Save	Attendance	Overall	Atlantic 10	Sources
February 17	7:30 p.m.		at FIU*		Infinity Insurance Park; Miami, FL	W 8–2	Shields (1–0)	Cabarcas (0–1)	None	1,002	1–0	—	Box Score
February 18	5:00 p.m.	CUSA.tv	at FIU*		Infinity Insurance Park	L 2–3	Santana (1–0)	Martins (0–1)	None	938	1–1	—	Box Score
February 19	1:00 p.m.		at FIU*		Infinity Insurance Park	W 5–2	Peterson (1–0)	Hernandez (0–1)	Mracna (1)	552	2–1	—	Box Score
February 21	3:00 p.m.		at James Madison*		Eagle Field at Veterans Memorial Park; Harrisonburg, VA	L 2–10	Cone (1–0)	Knox (0–1)	None	357	2–2	—	Box Score
Swig and Swing College Classic
February 24	5:00 p.m.		vs. Rutgers*		Shipyard Park; Charleston, SC	L 4–5^{10}	Bello (1–0)	Herkey (0–2)	None	125	2–3	—	Box Score
February 26	1:00 p.m.		vs. Canisius*		Shipyard Park	L 4–6	Consigli (1–0)	Menaker (0–1)	None	138	2–4	—	Box Score
February 28	3:00 p.m.		at William & Mary*		Plumeri Park; Williamsburg, VA	L 3–4	Wall (2–1)	Knox (0–2)	None	227	2–5	—	Box Score

March (11–8)
Date	Time (ET)	TV	Opponent	Rank	Stadium	Score	Win	Loss	Save	Attendance	Overall	Atlantic 10	Sources
March 4	11:00 p.m.		Niagara*		Spuhler Field; Fairfax, VA	W 15–2	Shields (2–0)	Minckler (0–2)	None	176	3–5	—	Box Score
March 4	2:30 p.m.		Niagara*		Spuhler Field	W 6–3	Gartland (1–0)	Hospital (0–1)	Mracna (2)	176	4–5	—	Box Score
March 5	10:30 a.m.		Niagara*		Spuhler Field	L 4–8	Hospital (1–1)	Martins (0–1)	None	120	4–6	—	Box Score
March 5	3:30 p.m.		Niagara*		Spuhler Field	L 2–7^{7}	Cashman (2–0)	Yount (0–1)	None	120	4–7	—	Box Score
March 7	2:00 p.m.		Georgetown*		Spuhler Field	L 13–18	Jensen (2–1)	Stewart (0–1)	None	338	4–8	—	Box Score
March 10	3:00 p.m.		Saint Peter's*		Spuhler Field	Cancelled (inclement weather)					4–8	—	Report
March 11	11:00 a.m.		Saint Peter's*		Spuhler Field	W 15–6	Shields (3–0)	Gannon (0–2)	None	89	5–8	—	Box Score
March 11	2:30 p.m.		Saint Peter's*		Spuhler Field	W 9–1	Gartland (2–0)	Mahady (0–3)	None	89	6–8	—	Box Score
March 12	11:00 a.m.		Saint Peter's*		Spuhler Field	W 12–4	Eaton (1–0)	Frasher (0–4)	None	105	7–8	—	Box Score
March 14	2:00 p.m.		Maine*		Spuhler Field	W 11–1^{7}	Herkey (1–2)	Nielsen (0–2)	None	50	8–8	—	Box Score
March 18	11:00 a.m.		Cornell*		Spuhler Field	W 10–5	Shields (4–0)	Baker (0–2)	None	191	9–8	—	Box Score
March 18	2:30 p.m.		Cornell*		Spuhler Field	W 4–3	Stewart (1–1)	Edwards (0–2)	Edmonds (1)	191	10–8	—	Box Score
March 19	1:00 p.m.		Cornell*		Spuhler Field	W 15–4	Martins (1–1)	Urofsky (0–3)	None	117	11–8	—	Box Score
March 21	2:00 p.m.		William & Mary*		Spuhler Field	L 10–16	Pierce (2–1)	Posey (0–1)	None	95	11–9	—	Box Score
March 24	6:00 p.m.	ESPN+	at No. 10 East Carolina*		Clark–LeClair Stadium; Greenville, NC	L 3–11	Yesavage (4–0)	Shields (4–1)	None	4,137	11–10	—	Box Score
March 25	4:00 p.m.	ESPN+	at No. 10 East Carolina*		Clark–LeClair Stadium	L 1–8	Spivey (2–1)	Gartland (2–1)	None	5,542	11–11	—	Box Score
March 26	1:00 p.m.	ESPN+	at No. 10 East Carolina*		Clark–LeClair Stadium	L 0–5^{8}	Grosz (4–0)	Eaton (1–1)	None	3,816	11–12	—	
March 29	6:00 p.m.		at Longwood*		Bolding Stadium; Farmville, VA	W 13–6	Posey (1–1)	Taylor (0–5)	None	183	12–12	—	Box Score
March 31	12:00 p.m.		at Rhode Island*		Bill Beck Field; Kingston, RI	W 7–6	Shields (5–1)	Sposato (1–3)	Mracna (3)	135	13–12	1–0	Box Score
March 31	3:30 p.m.		at Rhode Island*		Bill Beck Field	L 4–8	Levesque (4–2)	Gartland (2–2)	None	117	13–13	1–1	Box Score

April (8–8)
Date	Time (ET)	TV	Opponent	Rank	Stadium	Score	Win	Loss	Save	Attendance	Overall	Atlantic 10	Sources
April 2	12:00 p.m.		at Rhode Island*		Bill Beck Field	W 5–0	Mracna (1–0)	Perry (2–3)	None	147	14–13	2–1	Box Score
April 4	4:00 p.m.	BEDN	at Georgetown*		Fort Dupont Park; Washington, DC	W 5–4	Lamere (1–0)	Mead (0–3)	None	217	15–13	—	Box Score
April 5	3:00 p.m.		at Towson*		John B. Schuerholz Park; Towson, MD	L 8–10	Santangelo (1–1)	Herkey (1–2)	None	167	15–14	—	Box Score
April 7	3:00 p.m.	ESPN+	Dayton		Spuhler Field	L 5–6	Packard (1–5)	Mracna (1–1)	Bard (1)	193	15–15	2–2	Box Score
April 8	2:00 p.m.	ESPN+	Dayton		Spuhler Field	W 11–0	Gartland (3–2)	Majick (2–2)	None	320	16–15	3–2	Box Score
April 9	1:00 p.m.	ESPN+	Dayton		Spuhler Field	L 5–6	Wissman (2–1)	Posey (1–2)	Zapka (1)	187	16–16	3–3	Box Score
April 11	3:00 p.m.		Longwood*		Spuhler Field	L 5–10	Fisher (2–2)	Knox (0–3)	None	88	16–17	—	Box Score
George Mason–VCU Series
April 14	6:00 p.m.	ESPN+	at VCU		The Diamond; Richmond, VA	L 0–5	Peters (2–3)	Shields (5–2)	Erka (2)	451	16–18	3–4	Box Score
April 15	2:00 p.m.	ESPN+	at VCU		The Diamond	W 10–5	Gartland (4–2)	Ellis (4–3)	None	716	17–18	4–4	Box Score
April 16	1:00 p.m.	ESPN+	at VCU		The Diamond	L 3–11	Gladden (4–1)	Eaton (1–2)	None	508	17–19	4–5	Box Score
April 21	3:00 p.m.		St. Bonaventure		Spuhler Field	W 7–6^{11}	Mranca (2–1)	O'Connell (1–1)	None	66	18–19	5–5	Box Score
April 22	2:00 p.m.		St. Bonaventure		Spuhler Field	W 17–5	Rumberg (1–0)	Watts (2–5)	None	123	19–19	6–5	Box Score
April 23	1:00 p.m.		St. Bonaventure		Spuhler Field	L 3–4^{11}	Hediger (1–5)	Posey (1–3)	Devine (5)	216	19–20	6–6	Box Score
April 25	3:00 p.m.		Mount St. Mary's*		Spuhler Field	W 3–1	Rumberg (2–0)	King (0–2)	Smith (1)	58	20–20	—	Box Score
April 29	11:00 a.m.		Richmond		Spuhler Field	W 4–3	Shields (6–2)	Weirather (4–3)	Gartland (1)	89	21–20	7–6	Box Score
April 29	2:30 p.m.		Richmond		Spuhler Field	L 0–7	Neff (3–0)	Eaton (1–3)	Subers (1)	213	21–21	7–7	Box Score
April 30	1:00 p.m.		Richmond		Spuhler Field	Canceled (inclement weather)					21–21	7–7	

May (8–3)
Date	Time (ET)	TV	Opponent	Rank	Stadium	Score	Win	Loss	Save	Attendance	Overall	Atlantic 10	Sources
May 3	6:00 p.m.		at Navy*		Terwilliger Brothers Field; Annapolis, MD	W 4–1	Rumberg (3–0)	Hamill (0–3)	Menaker (1)	247	22–21	—	Box Score
May 5	3:00 p.m.	ESPN+	at Fordham		Houlihan Park; The Bronx, NY	L 1–2	Lavelle (1–4)	Shields (6–3)	Kovel (7)	155	22–22	7–8	Box Score
May 6	1:00 p.m.	ESPN+	at Fordham		Houlihan Park	W 10–5	Gartland (5–2)	Sachen (0–4)	Stewart (1)	211	23–22	8–8	Box Score
May 7	12:00 p.m.	ESPN+	at Fordham		Houlihan Park	W 11–10	Lamere (2–0)	Simeone (0–2)	Posey (1)	264	24–22	9–8	Box Score
Revolutionary Series
May 12	3:00 p.m.	ESPN+	at George Washington		Barcroft Park; Arlington, VA	W 8–7	Lamere (3–0)	Haug (1–2)	Mracna (4)	146	25–22	10–8	Box Score
May 13	1:00 p.m.	ESPN+	at George Washington		Barcroft Park	W 13–6	Gartland (6–2)	Brennan (2–4)	Stewart (2)	172	26–22	11–8	Box Score
May 14	12:00 p.m.	ESPN+	at George Washington		Barcroft Park	W 9–5	Rumberg (4–0)	Foltz (1–4)	None	216	27–22	12–8	Box Score
May 16	6:00 p.m.		at Maryland Eastern Shore*		Hawk Stadium; Princess Anne, MD	W 4–3	Posey (2–3)	Horner (0–1)	Salina (1)	76	28–22	—	Box Score
May 18	3:00 p.m.	ESPN+	Saint Joseph's		Spuhler Field	L 4–9	Falco (3–1)	Stewart (1–2)	None	65	28–23	12–9	Box Score
May 19	2:00 p.m.	ESPN+	Saint Joseph's		Spuhler Field	W 4–3	Mracna (3–1)	Stetzart (2–3)	None	143	29–23	13–9	Box Score
May 20	1:00 p.m.	ESPN+	Saint Joseph's		Spuhler Field	L 6–13	Picone (5–5)	Grant (0–1)	None	266	29–24	13–10	Box Score

Post-Season (7–3)

Atlantic 10 Tournament (5–1)
Date	Time (ET)	TV	Opponent	Rank	Stadium	Score	Win	Loss	Save	Attendance	Overall	A10T Record	Sources
May 23	7:00 p.m.	ESPN+	vs. (3) Dayton	(6)	The Diamond; Richmond, VA	W 5–4^{11}	Mracna (4–1)	Bard (2–3)	Lamere (1)	877	30–24	1–0	Box Score
May 24	3:00 p.m.	ESPN+	vs. (2) Davidson	(6)	The Diamond	W 15–11	Shields (7–3)	Feczko (6–6)	None	835	31–24	2–0	Box Score
May 26	11:00 a.m.	ESPN+	vs. (4) Saint Louis	(6)	The Diamond	L 5–6	Weber (3–2)	Rumberg (4–1)	Bell (4)	703	31–25	2–1	Box Score
May 26	3:00 p.m.	ESPN+	vs. (3) Dayton	(6)	The Diamond	W 3–2	Smith (1–0)	Wissman (4–2)	Gartland (2)	703	32–25	3–1	Box Score
May 27	12:00 p.m.	ESPN+	vs. (4) Saint Louis	(6)	The Diamond	W 4–1	Menaker (1–1)	Smith (1–3)	Shields (1)	817	33–25	4–1	Box Score
May 27	3:00 p.m.	ESPN+	vs. (4) Saint Louis	(6)	The Diamond	W 6–2	Stewart (2–2)	Holmes (3–2)	None	817	34–25	5–1	Box Score

NCAA Winston-Salem Regional (2–2)
Date	Time (ET)	TV	Opponent	Rank	Stadium	Score	Win	Loss	Save	Attendance	Overall	NCAAT Record	Sources
June 2	7:00 p.m.	ESPN+	at (1) No. 1 Wake Forest*	(4)	David F. Couch Ballpark; Winston-Salem, NC	L 0–12	Keener (7–1)	Shields (7–4)	None	3,823	34–26	0–1	Box Score
June 3	12:00 p.m.	ESPN+	vs. (3) Northeastern*	(4)	David F. Couch Ballpark	W 11–3	Gartland (7–2)	Cabral (9–4)	None	783	35–26	1–1	Box Score
June 4	2:00 p.m.	ESPN+	vs. (2) No. 19 Maryland*	(4)	David F. Couch Ballpark	W 11–10	Smith (2–0)	Falco (4–1)	None	781	36–26	2–1	Box Score
June 4	6:00 p.m.	ESPN+	at (1) No. 1 Wake Forest*	(4)	David F. Couch Ballpark	L 1–15	Hartle (10–2)	Rumberg (4–2)	None	3,823	36–27	2–2	Box Score

Legend: = Win = Loss = Canceled
Bold =George Mason team member
Rankings are based on the team's current ranking in the D1Baseball poll.

== Tournaments ==
=== Atlantic 10 tournament ===
Atlantic 10 Tournament Teams
(1) Saint Joseph's Hawks	(2) Davidson Wildcats	(3) Dayton Flyers	(4) Saint Louis Billikens	(5) Richmond Spiders	(6) George Mason Patriots	(7) Rhode Island Rams

Upper round 1	Upper round 2	Upper final	Final
1	Saint Joseph's	8
4	Saint Louis	23
4	Saint Louis	6
5	Richmond	3
4	Saint Louis	6
6	George Mason	5
3	Dayton	4
6	George Mason	5
6	George Mason	15
2	Davidson	11
2	Davidson	8
7	Rhode Island	4
4	Saint Louis	1	2
6	George Mason	4	6
Lower round 1	Lower round 2	Lower round 3	Lower final
1	Saint Joseph's	4
7	Rhode Island	3	5	Richmond	0	6	George Mason	3
5	Richmond	13	1	Saint Joseph's	10	3	Dayton	2
3	Dayton	15
3	Dayton	15
2	Davidson	4

=== NCAA Winston-Salem Regional ===
NCAA Winston-Salem Regional Teams
(1) Wake Forest Demon Deacons	(2) Maryland Terrapins	(3) Northeastern Huskies	(4) George Mason Patriots

Regional	Regional
1	Wake Forest	12
4	George Mason	0
1	Wake Forest	21
2	Maryland	6
3	Northeastern	2
2	Maryland	7
Winston-Salem Regional – David F. Couch Ballpark
4	George Mason	11
3	Northeastern	3
4	George Mason	11
2	Maryland	10
1	Alabama	4
4	Nicholls	3
1	Alabama	11
3	Troy	8
3	Troy	11
2	Boston College	10
Tuscaloosa Regional – Sewell–Thomas Stadium
4	Nicholls	6
2	Boston College	14
2	Boston College	4
3	Troy	1

Regional Final
1	Wake Forest	15	–
4	George Mason	1	–
1	Alabama	8	–
2	Boston College	0	–

Super Regional
1	Wake Forest
16	Alabama

== Rankings ==
Ranking movements Legend: ██ Increase in ranking ██ Decrease in ranking — = Not ranked RV = Received votes
	Week																			
Poll	Pre	1	2	3	4	5	6	7	8	9	10	11	12	13	14	15	16	17	18	Final
Coaches'	—	—*	—	—	—	—	—	—	—	—	—	—	—	—	—	—	—	—	RV	RV
Baseball America	—	—	—	—	—	—	—	—	—	—	—	—	—	—	—	—	—	—	—	—
Collegiate Baseball^	—	—	—	—	—	—	—	—	—	—	—	—	—	—	—	—	—	—	RV	RV
NCBWA†	—	—	—	—	—	—	—	—	—	—	—	—	—	—	—	—	—	RV	RV	RV
D1Baseball	—	—	—	—	—	—	—	—	—	—	—	—	—	—	—	—	—	—	—	—

^ Collegiate Baseball ranked 40 teams in their preseason poll, but only ranked 30 teams weekly during the season.
† NCBWA ranks 30 teams in their preseason poll, but only ranks 25 teams weekly during the season.
* A new poll was not released for this week, so for comparison purposes, the previous week's ranking is inserted in this week's slot.
