= Tracy Woodson =

American baseball player and coach (born 1962)

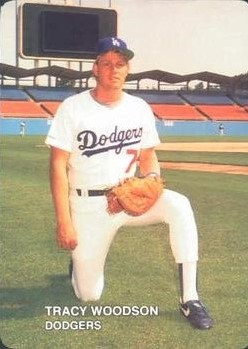
- Third baseman / Manager
- Born: October 5, 1962 (age 62); Richmond, Virginia, U.S.
- Batted: Right Threw: Right

MLB debut
- April 7, 1987, for the Los Angeles Dodgers

Last MLB appearance
- October 2, 1993, for the St. Louis Cardinals

MLB statistics
- Batting average: .247
- Home runs: 5
- Runs batted in: 50
- Stats at Baseball Reference

Teams
- Los Angeles Dodgers (1987–1989); St. Louis Cardinals (1992–1993)

Career highlights and awards
- World Series champion (1988)

Tracy Michael Woodson (born October 5, 1962) is an American former professional baseball player and college coach. He played all or part of five seasons in Major League Baseball (MLB), from 1987 to 1989 and 1992 to 1993, primarily as a third baseman. He recently coached the Richmond Spiders baseball team.

== Playing career ==
Woodson played college baseball for NC State from 1982 to 1984. His teammates included Doug Davis, Dan Plesac, Doug Strange, and Jim Toman. In 1983, he played collegiate summer baseball with the Hyannis Mets of the Cape Cod Baseball League.

Over his five-year major league career, he played with the Los Angeles Dodgers and the St. Louis Cardinals. Woodson was a member of the Los Angeles Dodgers team that won the 1988 World Series. Notably, against the Cincinnati Reds on September 16 of that year, he struck out for the 27th and final out in Tom Browning's perfect game. Woodson pinch-hit for Dodgers right-hander Tim Belcher. His first career home-run came off of Hall of Fame pitcher Nolan Ryan.

== Coaching career ==
After his playing career was over, he managed for several years in minor league baseball, where he compiled a record of 443 wins and 468 losses and the 2003 Southern League championship with the Carolina Mudcats. Prior to the start of 2007 season, he was named the head baseball coach at Valparaiso, where he coached for seven seasons (2007–13) and led the program to two NCAA Tournament appearances. Prior to the start of the 2014 season, he left Valparaiso to become the head coach of Richmond.

He also works as a Division I men's college basketball referee.

== Minor League Baseball managerial record ==
Year	Team	League	Record	Finish	Organization	Playoffs
1998	Erie SeaWolves	New York-Penn League	26–50	14th	Pittsburgh Pirates	
1999	Hickory Crawdads	South Atlantic League	70–70	6th	Pittsburgh Pirates	Lost in 2nd round
2000	Lynchburg Hillcats	Carolina League	66–72	6th	Pittsburgh Pirates	Lost League Finals
2001	Mobile BayBears	Southern League	65–73	6th	San Diego Padres	
2002	Fort Wayne Wizards	Midwest League	69–68	8th	San Diego Padres	
2003	Carolina Mudcats	Southern League	80–58	1st	Florida Marlins	League Champs
2004	Albuquerque Isotopes	Pacific Coast League	67–77	12th	Florida Marlins	
	Total		443–468			

== Head coaching record ==
The following is a table of Woodson's NCAA head coaching records.

Statistics overview
Season	Team	Overall	Conference	Standing	Postseason
Valparaiso Crusaders (Mid-Continent Conference) (2007)
2007	Valparaiso	22–34	10–10	3rd	Mid-Con Tournament
Valparaiso Crusaders (Horizon League) (2008–2013)
2008	Valparaiso	21–35	8–13	6th	Horizon Tournament
2009	Valparaiso	28–24	12–11	4th	Horizon Tournament
2010	Valparaiso	24–32	9–10	4th	Horizon Tournament
2011	Valparaiso	25–32	14–10	4th	Horizon Tournament
2012	Valparaiso	35–25	22–8	1st	NCAA Regional
2013	Valparaiso	32–28	13–11	t-2nd	NCAA Regional
Valparaiso:		187–210 (.471)	88–73 (.547)		
Richmond Spiders (Atlantic 10 Conference) (2014–2023)
2014	Richmond	24–28	13–12	5th	Atlantic 10 Tournament
2015	Richmond	28–25	15–9	2nd	Atlantic 10 Tournament
2016	Richmond	28–24	11–13	10th	
2017	Richmond	17–36	6–17	12th	
2018	Richmond	32–24	15–9	4th	Atlantic 10 Tournament
2019	Richmond	28–25–1	13–8	5th	Atlantic 10 Tournament
2020	Richmond	5–12	0–0		Season canceled due to COVID-19
2021	Richmond	19–17	5–11	6th (South)	
2022	Richmond	30–26	11–13	7th	Atlantic 10 Tournament
2023	Richmond	27–28	14–9	5th	Atlantic 10 Tournament
Richmond:		238–245–1 (.493)	103–101 (.505)		
Total:		425–455–1 (.483)			
National champion Postseason invitational champion Conference regular season champion Conference regular season and conference tournament champion Division regular season champion Division regular season and conference tournament champion Conference tournament champion

== See also ==
- List of current NCAA Division I baseball coaches
