= 2023 Davidson Wildcats baseball team =

2023 season for the Davidson Wildcats baseball program

2023 Davidson Wildcats baseball
- Conference: Atlantic 10 Conference
- Record: 30–24 (15–8 A-10)
- Head coach: Rucker Taylor (5th season)
- Assistant coaches: Todd Miller (1st season); Josiah Hissong (1st season)
- Pitching coach: Bobby Hearn (1st season)
- Home stadium: Wilson Field

2023 Atlantic 10 Conference baseball standings
	Conf.						Overall
Team	W		L		T	PCT	W		L		T	PCT
Saint Joseph's ‍†‍‍	17	–	7	–	0	.708	28	–	24	–	1	.538
Davidson ‍‍‍	15	–	8	–	0	.652	30	–	24	–	0	.556
Saint Louis ‍‍‍	15	–	9	–	0	.625	33	–	23	–	0	.589
Dayton ‍‍‍	15	–	9	–	0	.625	26	–	34	–	0	.433
Richmond ‍‍‍	14	–	9	–	0	.609	27	–	28	–	0	.491
George Mason ‍‍‡‍^{y}	13	–	10	–	0	.565	36	–	27	–	0	.571
Rhode Island ‍‍‍	13	–	11	–	0	.542	23	–	29	–	0	.442
George Washington ‍‍‍	11	–	12	–	0	.478	21	–	34	–	0	.382
VCU ‍‍‍	11	–	13	–	0	.458	25	–	30	–	0	.455
Fordham ‍‍‍	7	–	17	–	0	.292	19	–	36	–	0	.345
UMass ‍‍‍	6	–	18	–	0	.250	14	–	35	–	0	.286
St. Bonaventure ‍‍‍	5	–	19	–	0	.208	8	–	40	–	0	.167
† – Conference champion ‡ – Tournament champion y – Invited to the NCAA tournament As of June 25, 2023; Rankings from D1Baseball

The 2023 Davidson Wildcats baseball team represented Davidson College during the 2023 NCAA Division I baseball season. The Wildcats played their home games at T. Henry Wilson Jr. Field as a member of the Atlantic 10 Conference. They were led by head coach Rucker Taylor, in his fifth season with the program.

Davidson finished the season with a 30–24 and went 1–2 in the Atlantic 10 tournament.

== Previous season ==
The 2022 Davidson Wildcats baseball team notched a 43–13 (20–4) regular season record, winning the Atlantic 10 regular season championship, and earning the top overall seed and hosting rights in the 2022 Atlantic 10 Conference baseball tournament. Davidson opened their tournament series with a victory over George Mason, before losing two consecutive games to VCU and Richmond to eliminate them in the tournament. Despite their 40-plus win season, Davidson did not earn an at-large berth into the 2022 NCAA Division I baseball tournament.

At the end of the season, assistant coach Ryan Munger left Davidson to join former VCU head coach, Shawn Stiffler, to be an assistant coach for the University of Notre Dame. Pitching coach, Parker Bangs, left Davidson in the offseason to become the new pitching coach for Rice University.

In September 2022, Davidson hired Todd Miller from Tennessee Tech as an assistant coach.

== Preseason ==
=== Preseason Atlantic 10 awards and honors ===
Michael Carico was named the Atlantic 10 Preseason Player of the Year and Ryan Feczko was named the Preseason Pitcher of the Year. Carico, Feczko, Ryan Wilson, and Bennett Flynn were named to the All-Atlantic 10 Preseason team.

A-10 Preseason Player of the Year
Player	No.	Position	Class
Michael Carico	5	C	Junior

A-10 Preseason Pitcher of the Year
Player	No.	Position	Class
Ryan Feczko	36	1B	RS Sophomore

Preseason All-Atlantic 10 Team
Player	No.	Position	Class
Michael Carico	5	C	Junior
Ryan Wilson	19	1B	Junior
Ryan Feczko	36	RHP	RS Sophomore
Bennett Flynn	42	RHP	Senior

=== Coaches poll ===
The Atlantic 10 baseball coaches' poll was released on February 7, 2023. Davidson was picked to win the Atlantic 10.

Coaches' Poll
Predicted finish	Team	Points
1	Davidson	130 (5)
2	VCU	125 (4)
3	Richmond	103 (1)
4	Saint Louis	103
5	Dayton	92 (1)
6	Rhode Island	85
7	Saint Joseph's	81
8	George Mason	70 (1)
9	Fordham	52
10	George Washington	51
11	UMass	27
12	St. Bonaventure	17

=== Preseason All-Americans ===
First Team All-Americans
Player	No.	Position	Class	Selector(s)
Michael Carico	5	C	Junior	Collegiate Baseball; NCBWA

Second Team All-Americans
Player	No.	Position	Class	Selector(s)
Michael Carico	5	C	Junior	Baseball America; D1Baseball

== Personnel ==
=== Starters ===
Lineup
Pos.	No.	Player.	Year
C	5	Michael Carico	Junior
1B	19	Ryan Wilson	Junior
2B	9	Jake Wilhoit	Junior
3B	8	Nick Calero	Junior
SS	7	Jacob Hinderleider	Senior
LF	4	Tyler Douglas	Junior
CF	13	Jacob Friend	Sophomore
RF	29	Henry Koehler	Senior
DH	22	Anthony Torreso	Freshman

Weekend pitching rotation
Day	No.	Player.	Year
Friday	17	Will Schomberg	Senior
Saturday	36	Ryan Feczko	RS Sophomore
Sunday	26	Ryan Kutz	Senior

=== Roster ===
2023 Davidson Wildcats baseball team
Players
Coaches

#	Pos.	Name	B/T	Height	Weight	Year	Home town
1		Anthony Mase	R/R	5 ft 11 in (1.8 m)	185 lb (84 kg)	Sr	Los Angeles, CA
2		Troy Johnson	R/R	6 ft 0 in (1.83 m)	178 lb (81 kg)	So	Corpus Christi, TX
4	OF	Tyler Douglas	L/L	6 ft 0 in (1.83 m)	187 lb (85 kg)	Jr	The Woodlands, TX
5	C	Michael Carico	L/R	6 ft 0 in (1.83 m)	190 lb (86 kg)	Jr	Kernersville, NC
6		Aidan Rice	R/R	6 ft 1 in (1.85 m)	175 lb (79 kg)	Fr	Durham, NC
7	INF	Jacob Hinderleider	R/R	6 ft 2 in (1.88 m)	200 lb (91 kg)	Sr	Kaneohe, HI
8	INF	Nick Calero	R/R	5 ft 10 in (1.78 m)	188 lb (85 kg)	Jr	Miami, FL
9	INF	Jake Wilhoit	R/R	6 ft 0 in (1.83 m)	180 lb (82 kg)	Jr	Knoxville, TN
10	INF	Michael O'Shaughnessy	L/R	6 ft 1 in (1.85 m)	180 lb (82 kg)	Fr	Delmar, NY
11	INF	Eli Putnam	R/R	6 ft 4 in (1.93 m)	215 lb (98 kg)	So	Cabin John, MD
12	INF	Joe Haney	L/R	6 ft 1 in (1.85 m)	195 lb (88 kg)	Jr	Denver, NC
13	OF	Jacob Friend	L/R	6 ft 1 in (1.85 m)	185 lb (84 kg)	So	Arlington, VA
14	RHP	Brycen Champey	R/R	6 ft 3 in (1.91 m)	175 lb (79 kg)	Fr	New Bern, NC
15	LHP	Isaac Fix	R/L	6 ft 1 in (1.85 m)	165 lb (75 kg)	So	Vinton, VA
16	OF	Landon Reeves	L/L	6 ft 5 in (1.96 m)	215 lb (98 kg)	So	Overland Park, KS
17	RHP	Will Schomberg	R/R	5 ft 10 in (1.78 m)	170 lb (77 kg)	Sr	Clemmons, NC
18	INF	Jake Dunagan	L/R	6 ft 0 in (1.83 m)	190 lb (86 kg)	Jr	Cypress, TX
19	OF	Ryan Wilson	/	6 ft 1 in (1.85 m)	195 lb (88 kg)	Jr
20	RHP	Will Banks	/	6 ft 6 in (1.98 m)	220 lb (100 kg)	Fr
21	RHP	Ed Hall	/	6 ft 3 in (1.91 m)	190 lb (86 kg)	Fr
22	C	Anthony Torreso	/	6 ft 2 in (1.88 m)	195 lb (88 kg)	Fr
23	RHP	Nick Shedleski	/	6 ft 3 in (1.91 m)	215 lb (98 kg)	Jr
25	INF	Jack Cotrone	/	6 ft 1 in (1.85 m)	190 lb (86 kg)	So
26	RHP	Ryan Kutz	R/R	6 ft 1 in (1.85 m)	210 lb (95 kg)	Sr	Hummelstown, PA
27	RHP	Miles Jamieson	/	6 ft 3 in (1.91 m)	200 lb (91 kg)	Jr
28	LHP	Matt Weber	/	6 ft 1 in (1.85 m)	205 lb (93 kg)	So
29	OF	Henry Koehler	/	5 ft 11 in (1.8 m)	172 lb (78 kg)	Sr
30	INF	JD Woodall	/	5 ft 11 in (1.8 m)	180 lb (82 kg)	So
31	LHP	Danny Rosenfield	/	6 ft 3 in (1.91 m)	185 lb (84 kg)	Jr
32	RHP	Micah Baermann	/	6 ft 1 in (1.85 m)	180 lb (82 kg)	Jr
33	RHP	Henry Hultquist	/	6 ft 3 in (1.91 m)	205 lb (93 kg)	Fr
35	RHP	Jacob Peaden	/	6 ft 2 in (1.88 m)	200 lb (91 kg)	Sr
36	LHP	Ryan Feczko	/	6 ft 2 in (1.88 m)	185 lb (84 kg)	RS So
38	RHP	Toren Herrick	/	6 ft 2 in (1.88 m)	215 lb (98 kg)	Sr
39		AJ Pabst	/	5 ft 9 in (1.75 m)	165 lb (75 kg)	Sr
40	RHP	Maddux Smith	/	6 ft 3 in (1.91 m)	215 lb (98 kg)	So
41	LHP	Hunter Anderson	/	5 ft 11 in (1.8 m)	185 lb (84 kg)	Sr
42	RHP	Bennett Flynn	/	6 ft 1 in (1.85 m)	175 lb (79 kg)	Sr

Head coach

Rucker Taylor

Assistant coach(es)

Todd Miller
Josiah Hissong
Bobby Hearn

Legend

- (C) Team captain
- (S) Suspended
- (I) Ineligible
- Injured
- Current redshirt

Roster
Last update: February 12, 2023

=== Coaching staff ===
2023 Davidson Wildcats baseball coaching staff
Name	Position	Seasons at Davidson	Alma mater
Chris Clunie	Athletic Director	5	Davidson College (2006)
Rucker Taylor	Head coach	5	Vanderbilt University (2006)
Todd Miller	Assistant Coach	1	Bluffton University (2006)
Bobby Hearn	Pitching Coach	1	Wake Forest University (2019)
Josiah Hissong	Volunteer Assistant Coach	1	Alderson Broaddus University (2019)
Evan Simon	Director of Sports Performance	5	Frostburg State University (2002)
Elizabeth Allred	Sports Dietitian	12	University of Virginia (1999)
Alex Northrup	Assistant Athletic Trainer	2	The Citadel (2021)
Justin Parker	Assistant Director	5	Wingate University (2002)

== Game log ==
2023 Davidson Wildcats baseball game log (30–24)
Regular season (29–22)

February (5–3)
Date	Time (ET)	TV	Opponent	Rank	Stadium	Score	Win	Loss	Save	Attendance	Overall	Atlantic 10	Sources
February 17	5:30 p.m.	ESPN+	NJIT*		T. Henry Wilson Jr. Field; Davidson, NC	W 4–3	Will Schomberg (1–0)	Ryan Fischer (0–1)	Bennett Flynn (1)	365	1–0	—	Box Score
February 18	2:30 p.m.		NJIT*		T. Henry Wilson Jr. Field	L 4–12	Aidan Kidd (1–0)	Ryan Feczko (0–1)	—	367	1–1	—	Box Score
February 19	1:00 p.m.	ESPN+	NJIT*		T. Henry Wilson Jr. Field	L 6–14	Joe Georgini (1–0)	Ryan Kutz (0–1)	—	267	1–2	—	Box Score
February 21	6:00 p.m.	ESPN+	North Carolina A&T*		T. Henry Wilson Jr. Field	W 15–1	Isaac Fix (1–0)	Coley Kilpatrick (0–1)	—	247	2–2	—	Box Score
February 24	5:30 p.m.	ESPN+	Lafayette*		T. Henry Wilson Jr. Field	L 3–7	Alex Walsh (1–1)	Will Schomberg (1–1)	—	526	2–3	—	Box Score
February 25	2:00 p.m.		Lafayette*		T. Henry Wilson Jr. Field	W 13–11	Ryan Feczko (1–1)	Luke Craytor (0–2)	—	244	3–3	—	Box Score
February 26	1:00 p.m.	ESPN+	Lafayette*		T. Henry Wilson Jr. Field	W 19–3	Brycen Champey (1–0)	Trace Florio (0–1)	—	364	4–3	—	Box Score
February 28	6:00 p.m.	ESPN+	Queens*		T. Henry Wilson Jr. Field	W 16–6	Miles Jamieson (1–0)	Joseph Rodriguez (0–1)	—	212	5–3	—	Box Score

March (8–7)
Date	Time (ET)	TV	Opponent	Rank	Stadium	Score	Win	Loss	Save	Attendance	Overall	Atlantic 10	Sources
March 3	4:00 p.m.	ESPN+	at Coastal Carolina*		Springs Brooks Stadium; Conway, SC	L 6–7	Teddy Sharkey (1–0)	Brycen Champey (1–1)	—	1,397	5–4	—	Box Score
March 4	2:00 p.m.	ESPN+	at Coastal Carolina*		Springs Brooks Stadium	L 5–26	Levi Huesman (1–0)	Ryan Feczko (1–2)	—	1,542	5–5	—	Box Score
March 5	1:00 p.m.	ESPN+	at Coastal Carolina*		Springs Brooks Stadium	L 5–12	Darin Horn (1–0)	Miles Jamieson (1–1)	Teddy Sharkey (2)	1,738	5–6	—	Box Score
March 7	4:00 p.m.		at High Point*		Coy O. Williard Stadium; High Point, NC	W 10–7	AJ Pabst (1–0)	Sean Duffy (0–1)		301	6–6	—	Box Score
March 10	5:30 p.m.	ESPN+	Bryant*		T. Henry Wilson Jr. Field	L 5–6^{11}	Austin Wainer (1–1)	Miles Jamieson (1–2)	—	244	6–7	—	Box Score
March 11	2:00 p.m.		Bryant*		T. Henry Wilson Jr. Field	L 5–15	Coleman Picard (2–1)	Ryan Feczko (1–3)	—	344	6–8	—	Box Score
March 12	1:00 p.m.	ESPN+	Bryant*		T. Henry Wilson Jr. Field	L 1–11^{7}	Ken Turner (1–1)	Brycen Champey (1–2)	—	312	6–9	—	Box Score
Kannapolis Series
March 14	3:00 p.m.	ESPN+	vs. Western Carolina*		Atrium Health Ballpark; Kannapolis, NC	W 6–5	Bennett Flynn (1–0)	Dante Visconti (2–1)	Nick Shedleski (1)	773	7–9	—	Box Score
March 17	5:30 p.m.	ESPN+	Marist*		T. Henry Wilson Jr. Field	W 5–1	Will Schomberg (2–1)	Brian Yetter (1–3)	—	345	8–9	—	Box Score
March 18	2:00 p.m.	ESPN+	Marist*		T. Henry Wilson Jr. Field	L 8–14	Jack Bowery (1–2)	Will Banks (0–1)	Zane Kmietek (1)	355	8–10		Box Score
March 19	1:00 p.m.	ESPN+	Marist*		T. Henry Wilson Jr. Field	W 12–2	Brycen Champey (2–2)	John Hacker (0–3)	—	267	9–10	—	Box Score
March 21	6:00 p.m.		at Presbyterian*		The Plex; Clinton, SC	W 7–4	Ed Hall (1–0)	Colbey Klepper (1–1)	Nick Shedleski (2)	177	10–10	—	Box Score
March 24	5:30 p.m.	ESPN+	Tennessee Tech*		T. Henry Wilson Jr. Field	W 9–5	Will Schomberg (3–1)	Peyton Calitri (2–2)	—	249	11–10	—	Box Score
March 25	2:00 p.m.	ESPN+	Tennessee Tech*		T. Henry Wilson Jr. Field	W 12–10	Danny Rosenfield (1–0)	Reece McDuffie (1–2)	—	333	12–10	—	Box Score
March 26	1:00 p.m.	ESPN+	Tennessee Tech*		T. Henry Wilson Jr. Field	W 6–5	Bennett Flynn (2–0)	Brody Lanham (0–3)	—	207	13–10	—	Box Socre
March 28	6:00 p.m.		at North Carolina A&T*		World War Memorial Stadium; Greensboro, NC	Cancelled (inclement weather)					13–10	—	Report

April (11–7)
Date	Time (ET)	TV	Opponent	Rank	Stadium	Score	Win	Loss	Save	Attendance	Overall	Atlantic 10	Sources
April 1	2:00 p.m.		Fordham		T. Henry Wilson Jr. Field	W 7–5	Will Schomberg (4–1)	Declan Lavelle (0–2)	Bennett Flynn (2)	134	14–10	1–0	Box Score
April 1	5:00 p.m.		Fordham		T. Henry Wilson Jr. Field	W 23–7	Ryan Feczko (2–3)	Gabe Karslo (2–3)	—	233	15–10	2–0	Box Score
April 2	1:00 p.m.	ESPN+	Fordham		T. Henry Wilson Jr. Field	L 4–6	Connor Haywood (1–1)	Nick Shedleski (0–1)	Ben Kovel (4)	307	15–11	2–1	Box Score
April 4	6:00 p.m.	ESPN+	Presbyterian*		T. Henry Wilson Jr. Field	W 5–4	Bennett Flynn (3–0)	Tanner Smith (1–2)	—	187	16–11	—	Box Score
April 7	3:00 p.m.	ESPN+	at UMass		Earl Lorden Field; Amherst, MA	W 9–2	Will Schomberg (5–1)	Max LeBlanc (0–2)	—	90	17–11	3–1	Box Score
April 8	1:00 p.m.		at UMass		Earl Lorden Field	W 4–3	Ryan Feczko (3–3)	Taylor Perrett (1–4)	AJ Pabst (1)	95	18–11	4–1	Box Score
April 9	12:00 p.m.	ESPN+	at UMass		Earl Lorden Field	W 14–6	Isaac Fix (2–0)	Jack Pawloski (1–2)	—	90	19–11	5–1	Box Score
April 11	5:00 p.m.	ACCNX	at Duke*		Jack Coombs Field; Durham, NC	L 0–19	Andrew Healy (2–1)	Miles Jamieson (1–3)	—	823	19–12	—	Box Score
April 14	5:30 p.m.	ESPN+	Dayton		T. Henry Wilson Jr. Field	L 4–8	Mark Manfredi (2–4)	Will Schomberg (5–2)	Andrew Zapka (2)	247	19–13	5–2	Box Score
April 15	2:00 p.m.	ESPN3	Dayton		T. Henry Wilson Jr. Field	W 5–4	Ryan Feczko (4–3)	Eli Majick (2–3)	Bennett Flynn (3)	566	20–13	6–2	Box Score
April 16	1:00 p.m.	ESPN+	Dayton		T. Henry Wilson Jr. Field	W 8–3	Jacob Peaden (1–0)	Ryan Steinhauer (1–4)	—	347	21–13	7–2	Box Score
Knights Series
April 18	7:00 p.m.	ESPN+	vs. No. 23 NC State*		Truist Field; Charlotte, NC	L 7–22	Rio Britton (2–1)	Brycen Champey (2–3)	—	2,624	21–14	—	Box Score
April 21	3:00 p.m.		at Rhode Island		Bill Beck Field; Kingston, RI	W 7–2	Will Schomberg (6–2)	Sean Sposato (2–4)	—	213	22–14	8–2	Box Score
April 22	1:00 p.m.	ESPN3	at Rhode Island		Bill Beck Field	L 6–8	Trystan Levesque (5–2)	Ryan Feczko (4–4)	Ryan Andrade (6)	108	22–15	8–3	Box Score
April 23	12:00 p.m.		at Rhode Island		Bill Beck Field	W 15–9	AJ Pabst (2–0)	Braeden Perry (3–4)	—	87	23–15	9–3	Box Score
April 26	6:00 p.m.	ESPN+	Wofford*		T. Henry Wilson Jr. Field	L 6–16^{7}	Charlie Weber (1–0)	Brycen Champey (2–4)	—	123	23–16	—	Box Score
April 29	12:00 p.m.		at George Washington		Barcroft Park; Arlington, VA	W 7–3	Ryan Feczko (5–4)	Logan Koester (4–3)	—	201	24–16	10–3	Box Score
April 29	3:30 p.m.	ESPN3	at George Washington		Barcroft Park	L 1–2	Chris Kahler (4–3)	Isaac Fix (2–1)	—	255	24–17	10–4	Box Score
April 30	1:00 p.m.		at George Washington		Barcroft Park	Canceled (inclement weather)					24–17	10–4	Report

May (5–5)
Date	Time (ET)	TV	Opponent	Rank	Stadium	Score	Win	Loss	Save	Attendance	Overall	Atlantic 10	Sources
May 2	6:00 p.m.		at Queens*		Tuckaseegee Dream Fields; Charlotte, NC	L 5–6	Offschanka (2–5)	Banks (0–2)	None	109	24–18	—	Box Score
May 4	12:00 p.m.	ESPN+	VCU		T. Henry Wilson Jr. Field	W 13–5	Feczko (6–4)	Erka (1–3)	None	232	25–18	11–4	Box Score
May 5	2:00 p.m.	ESPN+	VCU		T. Henry Wilson Jr. Field	L 4–9	Gladden (5–2)	Fix (2–2)	Ellis (3)	335	25–19	11–5	Box Score
May 6	1:00 p.m.	ESPN+	VCU		T. Henry Wilson Jr. Field	W 14–10	Flynn (4–0)	Peters (2–5)	None	431	26–19	12–5	Box Score
May 12	5:30 p.m.	ESPN+	Saint Louis		T. Henry Wilson Jr. Field	W 11–2	Schomberg (7–2)	Litman (4–3)	Flynn (4)	447	27–19	13–5	Box Score
May 13	2:00 p.m.	ESPN+	Saint Louis		T. Henry Wilson Jr. Field	W 12–11	Shedleski (1–1)	Bell (3–3)	None	449	28–19	14–5	Box Score
May 14	1:00 p.m.	ESPN+	Saint Louis		T. Henry Wilson Jr. Field	W 14–11	Fix (3–2)	Holmes (2–1)	None	505	29–19	15–5	Box Score
May 16	6:00 p.m.		at Winthrop*		Winthrop Ballpark; Rock Hill, SC	Canceled (inclement weather)					29–19	—	
May 18	6:00 p.m.	ESPN+	at Richmond		Malcolm U. Pitt Field; Richmond, VA	L 10–11	Hentschel (1–0)	Flynn (4–1)	None	302	29–20	15–6	Box Score
May 19	2:00 p.m.	ESPN+	at Richmond		Malcolm U. Pitt Field	L 3–7	Rodriguez (4–2)	Feczko (6–5)	None	333	29–21	15–7	Box Score
May 20	1:00 p.m.	ESPN+	at Richmond		Malcolm U. Pitt Field	L 2–18	Reinke (1–1)	Peaden (1–1)	None	352	29–22	15–8	Box Score

Post-Season (1–2)

Atlantic 10 Tournament (1–2)
Date	Time (ET)	TV	Opponent	Rank	Stadium	Score	Win	Loss	Save	Attendance	Overall	A10T Record	Sources
Winner's bracket
May 23	3:00 p.m.	ESPN+	vs. (7) Rhode Island	(2)	The Diamond; Richmond, VA	W 8–4	Flynn (5–1)	Andrade (1–2)	None	877	30–22	1–0	Box Score
May 24	3:30 p.m.	ESPN+	vs. (6) George Mason	(2)	The Diamond	L 11–15	Shields (7–3)	Feczko (6–6)	None	835	30–23	1–1	Box Score
Consolation bracket
May 25	11:00 a.m.	ESPN+	vs. (3) Dayton	(2)	The Diamond	L 4–15	Majick (5–4)	Peaden (1–2)	None	703	30–24	1–2	Box Score

Legend: = Win = Loss = Canceled
Bold =Davidson team member
Rankings are based on the team's current ranking in the D1Baseball poll.

== Tournaments ==
=== Atlantic 10 tournament ===
Atlantic 10 Tournament Teams
(1) Saint Joseph's Hawks	(2) Davidson Wildcats	(3) Dayton Flyers	(4) Saint Louis Billikens	(5) Richmond Spiders	(6) George Mason Patriots	(7) Rhode Island Rams

Upper round 1	Upper round 2	Upper final	Final
1	Saint Joseph's	8
4	Saint Louis	23
4	Saint Louis	6
5	Richmond	3
4	Saint Louis	6
6	George Mason	5
3	Dayton	4
6	George Mason	5
6	George Mason	15
2	Davidson	11
2	Davidson	8
7	Rhode Island	4
4	Saint Louis	1	2
6	George Mason	4	6
Lower round 1	Lower round 2	Lower round 3	Lower final
1	Saint Joseph's	4
7	Rhode Island	3	5	Richmond	0	6	George Mason	3
5	Richmond	13	1	Saint Joseph's	10	3	Dayton	2
3	Dayton	15
3	Dayton	15
2	Davidson	4

== Statistics ==
=== Team batting ===
Team	AB	Avg.	H	2B	3B	HR	RBI	BB	SO	SB
Davidson	0	.000	0	0	0	0	0	0	0	0
Opponents	0	.000	0	0	0	0	0	0	0	0

=== Team pitching ===
Team	IP	H	R	ER	BB	SO	SV	ERA
Davidson	0.0	0	0	0	0	0	0	0.00
Opponents	0.0	0	0	0	0	0	0	0.00

== Rankings ==
Ranking movements Legend: ██ Increase in ranking ██ Decrease in ranking — = Not ranked RV = Received votes
	Week																			
Poll	Pre	1	2	3	4	5	6	7	8	9	10	11	12	13	14	15	16	17	18	Final
Coaches'	—	—*	—	—	—	—	—	—	—	—	—									
Baseball America	—	—	—	—	—	—	—	—	—	—	—									
Collegiate Baseball^	45	—	—	—	—	—	—	—	—	—	—									
NCBWA†	RV	—	—	—	—	—	—	—	—	—	—									
D1Baseball	—	—	—	—	—	—	—	—	—	—	—									

^ Collegiate Baseball ranked 40 teams in their preseason poll, but only ranked 30 teams weekly during the season.
† NCBWA ranks 30 teams in their preseason poll, but only ranks 25 teams weekly during the season.
* A new poll was not released for this week, so for comparison purposes, the previous week's ranking is inserted in this week's slot.
