= Ryan Wheeler (baseball coach) =

American baseball coach (born 1971)

Current position
- Title: Director of Program Development
- Team: Penn State
- Conference: B10

Biographical details
- Born: March 2, 1971 (age 55)

Playing career
- 1991–1994: Penn State

Coaching career (HC unless noted)
- 1997–2005: William & Mary (asst.)
- 2006: Penn (asst.)
- 2007–2011: Richmond (asst.)
- 2012–2014: Temple
- 2015–2023: Saint Joseph's (IF/H)
- 2024-present: Penn State

Head coaching record
- Overall: 52–94

Ryan Wheeler (born March 2, 1971) is an American college baseball coach and former player. He is the Director of Program Development at Penn State University. Wheeler played college baseball at Pennsylvania State University from 1991 to 1994 for head coach Joe Hindelang. He then pursued a professional career. He previously served as the head baseball coach at Temple University from 2012 to 2014. On December 6, 2013, Temple University announced it was dropping seven intercollegiate sports, including the baseball program. The 2014 season was its last.

== Playing career ==
Wheeler played for Penn State for four years before being drafted in the 31st round of the 1994 MLB draft by the California Angels. He played briefly in the minors before turning to coaching.

== Coaching career ==
Wheeler began his coaching career at William & Mary, where he served as an assistant to head coach Jim Farr, the program's all-time winningest coach. Upon Farr's departure, Wheeler moved to Penn for one season before accepting an assistant position at Richmond. Eventually adding recruiting coordinator to his coaching duties, the Spiders posted 29 wins in 2011, his final season on the staff. Prior to the 2012 season, Wheeler accepted his first head coaching position at Temple. After Temple dropped its baseball program, he became an assistant coach and recruiting coordinator at Saint Joseph's. In 2023, when Mike Gambino was hired as the Penn State Head baseball Coach, Wheeler returned to his alma mater as Director of Program Development/Alumni Relations, as well as serving as a traditional assistant coach.

=== Head coaching record ===
The following table details Wheeler's record as a head coach.

Record table
Season	Team	Overall	Conference	Standing	Postseason
Temple Owls (Atlantic 10 Conference) (2012–2013)
2012	Temple	19–34	7–17	T–11th	
2013	Temple	18–28	7–16	T–13th	
Temple:		37–62 (.374)			
Temple Owls (American Athletic Conference) (2014)
2014	Temple	15–32	9–14		
Temple:		15–32	9–14		
Temple:		52–94	22–49		
Total:		52–94			
National champion Postseason invitational champion Conference regular season champion Conference regular season and conference tournament champion Division regular season champion Division regular season and conference tournament champion Conference tournament champion
