= 2023 Atlantic 10 Conference baseball season =

- League: Atlantic 10 Conference
- Sport: Baseball
- Number of teams: 12

Regular season
- Season champions: Saint Joseph's

Tournament
- Champions: George Mason
- Runners-up: Saint Louis

Atlantic 10 Conference baseball seasons
- ← 2022 2024 →

The 2023 Atlantic 10 Conference baseball season was the baseball season for the Atlantic 10 Conference as part of the 2023 NCAA Division I baseball season. The conference tournament took place May 23–27 at The Diamond in Richmond, Virginia, hosted by VCU.

== Regular season ==
The Atlantic 10 Conference began their conference play on March 31. Each team was scheduled to play 24 conference games.

=== Standings ===
| Pos | Team | Pld | CW | CL | CT | CPCT | GB | W | L | T | PCT | Qualification |
|---|---|---|---|---|---|---|---|---|---|---|---|---|
| 1 | Saint Joseph's (C) | 52 | 17 | 7 | 0 | .708 | — | 28 | 24 | 0 | .538 | Qualification for the second round |
| 2 | Davidson | 54 | 15 | 8 | 0 | .652 | 1.5 | 30 | 24 | 0 | .556 | Qualification for the first round |
| 3 | Dayton | 60 | 15 | 9 | 0 | .625 (Note: Dayton defeated Saint Louis 2 games to 1 in the regular season) | 2 | 26 | 34 | 0 | .433 | Qualification for the first round |
| 4 | Saint Louis | 56 | 15 | 9 | 0 | .625 | 2 | 33 | 23 | 0 | .589 | Qualification for the first round |
| 5 | Richmond | 55 | 14 | 9 | 0 | .609 | 2.5 | 27 | 28 | 0 | .491 | Qualification for the first round |
| 6 | George Mason (T) | 59 | 13 | 10 | 0 | .565 | 3.5 | 34 | 25 | 0 | .576 | Qualification for the first round & NCAA tournament |
| 7 | Rhode Island | 52 | 13 | 11 | 0 | .542 | 4 | 23 | 29 | 0 | .442 | Qualification for the first round |
| 8 | George Washington | 55 | 11 | 12 | 0 | .478 | 5.5 | 21 | 34 | 0 | .382 | |
| 9 | VCU | 55 | 11 | 13 | 0 | .458 | 6 | 25 | 30 | 0 | .455 | |
| 10 | Fordham | 55 | 7 | 17 | 0 | .292 | 10 | 19 | 36 | 0 | .345 | |
| 11 | UMass | 49 | 6 | 18 | 0 | .250 | 11 | 14 | 35 | 0 | .286 | |
| 12 | St. Bonaventure | 48 | 5 | 19 | 0 | .208 | 12 | 8 | 40 | 0 | .167 | |

Source: A10
(C) Champion; (T) Tournament champion

== Tournament ==
2023 Atlantic 10 Conference baseball tournament
- Teams: 7
- Format: Double-elimination
- Finals site: The Diamond; Richmond, Virginia
- Champions: George Mason (2 title)
- Television: ESPN+

The 2023 Atlantic 10 Conference baseball tournament took place May 23 to 27, 2023. The top seven regular season finishers of the league's eleven teams met in the double-elimination tournament to be held at The Diamond, the home field of VCU in Richmond, Virginia. George Mason won their second conference tournament title and earned the conference's automatic bid to the 2023 NCAA Division I baseball tournament.

The tournament used the same format adopted in 2014, with the top seven finishers from the regular season seeded one through seven. The top seed received a single bye while the remaining seeds played on the first day.

=== Bracket ===
Upper round 1 | Upper round 2 | Upper final | Final
1 | Saint Joseph's | 8
4 | Saint Louis | 23
4 | Saint Louis | 6
5 | Richmond | 3
4 | Saint Louis | 6
6 | George Mason | 5
3 | Dayton | 4
6 | George Mason | 5
6 | George Mason | 15
2 | Davidson | 11
2 | Davidson | 8
7 | Rhode Island | 4
4 | Saint Louis | 1 | 2
6 | George Mason | 4 | 6
Lower round 1 | Lower round 2 | Lower round 3 | Lower final
1 | Saint Joseph's | 4
7 | Rhode Island | 3 | 5 | Richmond | 0 | 6 | George Mason | 3
5 | Richmond | 13 | 1 | Saint Joseph's | 10 | 3 | Dayton | 2
3 | Dayton | 15
3 | Dayton | 15
2 | Davidson | 4

== NCAA Tournament ==
George Mason advanced to the Regional Final of the Winston-Salem Regional, losing to the host team, No. 1 Wake Forest.
