= Woerner Field =

Baseball venue in Dayton, OH on the University of Dayton campus

Woerner Field at Time Warner Cable Stadium
- Interactive map of Woerner Field at Time Warner Cable Stadium
- Former names: Time Warner Cable Stadium (2004-2011)
- Location: University of Dayton campus; Edwin C. Moses Blvd., Dayton, Ohio, USA
- Coordinates: 39.734273°N 84.203687°W
- Owner: University of Dayton
- Operator: University of Dayton
- Capacity: 500 (Seated)
- Scoreboard: Electronic
- Field size: Left Field: 330 feet (100 m); Left Center Field: 375 feet (114 m); Center Field: 400 feet (120 m); Right Center Field: 375 feet (114 m); Right Field: 330 feet (100 m)

Construction
- Opened: 2004
- Cost: $4 million

Tenant
- Dayton Flyers baseball (NCAA D1 A-10) (2004–present)

Woerner Field at Time Warner Cable Stadium is a baseball field located on the campus of the University of Dayton in Dayton, Ohio, United States. The field is home to the Dayton Flyers baseball team of the Division I Atlantic 10 Conference. The field holds a capacity of 500 seated fans.

== Construction ==
Construction of the facility was originally scheduled to begin after the end of the 2005 season. However, unrelated construction needs of the university necessitated the stadium's construction to begin in the summer of 2003, as the location of Stuart Field (Dayton baseball's former on-campus home) was needed for development. In summer 2004, the field itself, along with dugouts and a backstop, was constructed. Lighting and stadium seating were not added until after the 2004 seating. As a result, the Flyers did not play any home night games in 2004 and used temporary seating structures. The Flyers posted an 11–14 home record in 2004.

Following the 2004 season, batting cages, permanent seating structures, restrooms, and concessions were added to complete the stadium. The stadium was dedicated on May 7, 2005. The final construction cost estimate for the field was placed at $4 million.

== Naming ==
From 2004 to 2011, the venue was known simply as Time Warner Cable Stadium, for Time Warner Cable, Inc. On May 6, 2011, prior to a game against Xavier, the field was dedicated to former Dayton baseball player and university donor Larry Woerner.

== Dayton home records ==
The following is a list of Flyers home records since the team began playing at Time Warner Cable Stadium in the 2004 season.

Year	W	L	Win Pct.
2004	11	14	.440
2005	18	4	.818
2006	16	7	.696
2007	9	12	.429
2008	13	11	.542
2009	23	5	.821
2010	17	11	.607
2011	13	11	.542
2012	12	9	.571
Total	132	84	.629

== See also ==
- List of NCAA Division I baseball venues
