= Spuhler Field =

Baseball venue in Fairfax, Virginia

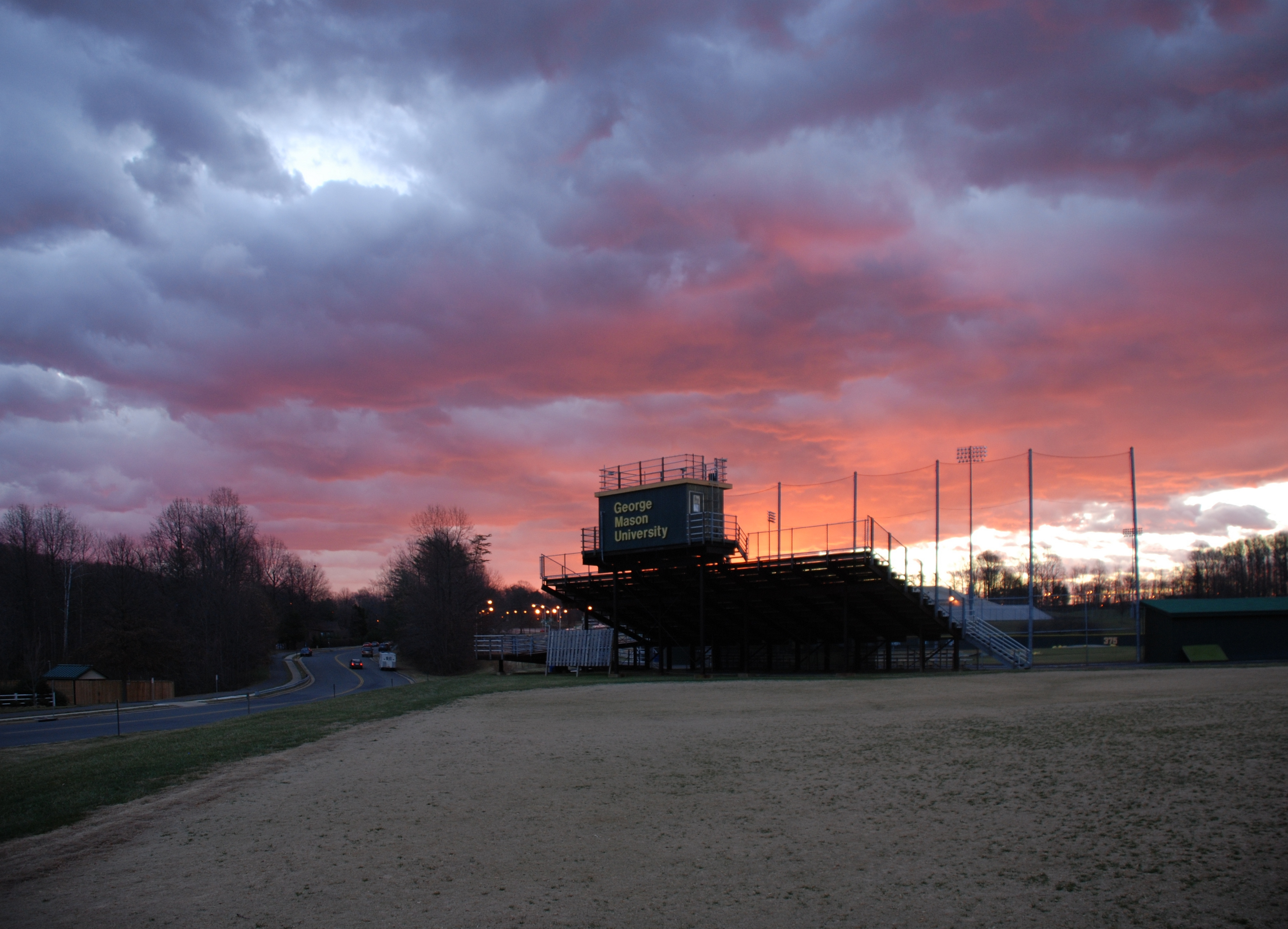
- Spuhler Field in 2023
- Interactive map of Spuhler Field
- Full name: Raymond H. "Hap" Spuhler Field
- Address: University Drive; Fairfax, Virginia; U.S.
- Coordinates: 38.835069°N 77.318349°W
- Owner: George Mason University
- Operator: George Mason University
- Capacity: 900
- Surface: Bermuda turf (2003–present); Bluegrass/rye mixture (1986–2003)
- Scoreboard: Electronic
- Field size: 320 ft (LF); 375 ft (LCF); 400 ft (CF); 375 ft (RCF); 320 ft (RF)

Construction
- Opened: 1986
- Renovated: 2003, 2016

Tenant
- George Mason Patriots baseball (A-10) 1986–present

Raymond H. "Hap" Spuhler Field is a baseball venue located on the campus of George Mason University in Fairfax, Virginia. It is home to the George Mason Patriots baseball team, which competes in NCAA Division I as a member of the Atlantic 10 Conference. The stadium has a seating capacity of 900 and is named after Raymond H. "Hap" Spuhler, the university's first head baseball coach and a former athletic director.

== History ==
Spuhler Field opened in 1986, offering George Mason baseball its first permanent on-campus home field. Before its construction, the team played at local fields across Northern Virginia.

In 1999–2000 and again in 2000–2001, the field earned national recognition from the Beam Clay College Baseball Diamond of the Year Awards, ranking third and second in the country, respectively. In 2002, the Sports Turf Managers Association named Spuhler Field the College/University Division Baseball Field of the Year.

In 2003, the original bluegrass/rye mix was replaced with a Bermuda turf surface. Renovations also included a sub-surface drainage system and an artificial turf collar around home plate to limit wear.

In 2016, the university completed a $1.3 million renovation of the dugouts, which were rebuilt and lowered for improved sightlines. Additional future upgrades are planned, including new seating, lights, and expanded press facilities.

== Features ==
Facilities at Spuhler Field include:

- Full-size dugouts and bullpens
- Electronic scoreboard
- Sprinkler system
- Batting cages and practice infield adjacent to first base side

The stadium is part of George Mason's central athletics complex, near the Field House and soccer/lacrosse stadium.

== See also ==
- List of NCAA Division I baseball venues
