= 2027 Liberty Flames baseball team =

American college baseball season

2027 Liberty Flames baseball
- Conference: Conference USA
- Record: – (– C-USA)
- Head coach: Bradley LeCroy (3rd season)
- Home stadium: Liberty Baseball Stadium

2027 Conference USA baseball standings
	Conf.				Overall
Team	W		L	PCT	W		L	PCT
Delaware ‍‍‍	0	–	0	–	0	–	0	–
FIU ‍‍‍	0	–	0	–	0	–	0	–
Jacksonville State ‍‍‍	0	–	0	–	0	–	0	–
Kennesaw State ‍‍‍	0	–	0	–	0	–	0	–
Liberty ‍‍‍	0	–	0	–	0	–	0	–
Middle Tennessee ‍‍‍	0	–	0	–	0	–	0	–
Missouri State ‍‍‍	0	–	0	–	0	–	0	–
New Mexico State ‍‍‍	0	–	0	–	0	–	0	–
Sam Houston ‍‍‍	0	–	0	–	0	–	0	–
Western Kentucky ‍‍‍	0	–	0	–	0	–	0	–
† – Conference champion ‡ – Tournament champion y – Invited to the NCAA Tournament; As of November 3, 2026; Rankings from D1Baseball

The 2027 Liberty Flames baseball team will represent Liberty University during the 2027 NCAA Division I baseball season. The Flames will play their home games at Liberty Baseball Stadium as members of Conference USA They will be led by head coach Bradley LeCroy.

== Previous season ==
The Flames are coming off a 43–21 season, where they finished 21–9 in conference play. The Flames went 3–1 as the number two seed in the 2026 Conference USA baseball tournament, losing to Jacksonville State in the final. The Flames would earn an at-large bid to the 2026 NCAA Division I baseball tournament, where they would ultimately lose in the Athens Regional.

== Schedule ==
2027 Liberty Flames baseball game log
Regular season

February
Date	Opponent	Rank	Stadium	Score	Win	Loss	Save	Attendance	Overall	C-USA
February 19	at Coastal Carolina		Springs Brooks Stadium; Conway, SC	-	(-)	(-)	()		-	-
February 20	at Coastal Carolina		Springs Brooks Stadium	-	(-)	(-)	()		-	-
February 21	at Coastal Carolina		Springs Brooks Stadium	-	(-)	(-)	()		-	-
February 23	at Duke		Jack Coombs Field; Durham, NC	-	(-)	(-)	()		-	-
February 26	Bryant		Liberty Baseball Stadium; Lynchburg, VA	-	(-)	(-)	()		-	-
February 27	Bryant		Liberty Baseball Stadium	-	(-)	(-)	()		-	-
February 28	Bryant		Liberty Baseball Stadium	-	(-)	(-)	()		-	-

March
Date	Opponent	Rank	Stadium	Score	Win	Loss	Save	Attendance	Overall	C-USA
March 2	Virginia Tech		Liberty Baseball Stadium	-	(-)	(-)	()		-	-
March 3	at North Carolina A&T		World War Memorial Stadium; Greensboro, NC	-	(-)	(-)	()		-	-
March 5	Binghamton		Liberty Baseball Stadium	-	(-)	(-)	()		-	-
March 6	Binghamton		Liberty Baseball Stadium	-	(-)	(-)	()		-	-
March 7	Binghamton		Liberty Baseball Stadium	-	(-)	(-)	()		-	-
March 9	Ohio		Liberty Baseball Stadium	-	(-)	(-)	()		-	-
March 12	at Auburn		Plainsman Park; Auburn, AL	-	(-)	(-)	()		-	-
March 13	at Auburn		Plainsman Park	-	(-)	(-)	()		-	-
March 14	at Auburn		Plainsman Park	-	(-)	(-)	()		-	-
March 16	at Clemson		Doug Kingsmore Stadium; Clemson, SC	-	(-)	(-)	()		-	-
March 19	Western Carolina		Liberty Baseball Stadium	-	(-)	(-)	()		-	-
March 20	Western Carolina		Liberty Baseball Stadium	-	(-)	(-)	()		-	-
March 21	Western Carolina		Liberty Baseball Stadium	-	(-)	(-)	()		-	-
March 24	at Wake Forest		David F. Couch Ballpark; Winston-Salem, NC	-	(-)	(-)	()		-	-
March 26	at Jacksonville State		Rudy Abbott Field; Jacksonville, AL	-	(-)	(-)	()		-	-
March 27	at Jacksonville State		Rudy Abbott Field	-	(-)	(-)	()		-	-
March 28	at Jacksonville State		Rudy Abbott Field	-	(-)	(-)	()		-	-
March 30	Virginia		Liberty Baseball Stadium	-	(-)	(-)	()		-	-

April
Date	Opponent	Rank	Stadium	Score	Win	Loss	Save	Attendance	Overall	C-USA
April 2	Western Kentucky		Liberty Baseball Stadium	-	(-)	(-)	()		-	-
April 3	Western Kentucky		Liberty Baseball Stadium	-	(-)	(-)	()		-	-
April 4	Western Kentucky		Liberty Baseball Stadium	-	(-)	(-)	()		-	-
April 6	at NC State		Doak Field; Raleigh, NC	-	(-)	(-)	()		-	-
April 9	at FIU		FIU Baseball Stadium; Westchester, FL	-	(-)	(-)	()		-	-
April 10	at FIU		FIU Baseball Stadium	-	(-)	(-)	()		-	-
April 11	at FIU		FIU Baseball Stadium	-	(-)	(-)	()		-	-
April 13	at Virginia		Davenport Field at Disharoon Park; Charlottesville, VA	-	(-)	(-)	()		-	-
April 16	at Delaware		Bob Hannah Stadium; Newark, DE	-	(-)	(-)	()		-	-
April 17	at Delaware		Bob Hannah Stadium	-	(-)	(-)	()		-	-
April 18	at Delaware		Bob Hannah Stadium	-	(-)	(-)	()		-	-
April 20	Duke		Liberty Baseball Stadium	-	(-)	(-)	()		-	-
April 23	Middle Tennessee		Liberty Baseball Stadium	-	(-)	(-)	()		-	-
April 24	Middle Tennessee		Liberty Baseball Stadium	-	(-)	(-)	()		-	-
April 25	Middle Tennessee		Liberty Baseball Stadium	-	(-)	(-)	()		-	-
April 27	North Carolina A&T		Liberty Baseball Stadium	-	(-)	(-)	()		-	-
April 30	at Sam Houston		Don Sanders Stadium; Huntsville, TX	-	(-)	(-)	()		-	-

May
Date	Opponent	Rank	Stadium	Score	Win	Loss	Save	Attendance	Overall	C-USA
May 1	at Sam Houston		Don Sanders Stadium	-	(-)	(-)	()		-	-
May 2	at Sam Houston		Don Sanders Stadium	-	(-)	(-)	()		-	-
May	at Virginia Tech		English Field; Blacksburg, VA	-	(-)	(-)	()		-	-
May 7	Kennesaw State		Liberty Baseball Stadium	-	(-)	(-)	()		-	-
May 8	Kennesaw State		Liberty Baseball Stadium	-	(-)	(-)	()		-	-
May 9	Kennesaw State		Liberty Baseball Stadium	-	(-)	(-)	()		-	-
May 11	at North Carolina		Boshamer Stadium; Chapel Hill, NC	-	(-)	(-)	()		-	-
May 13	at Missouri State		Route 66 Stadium; Springfield, MO	-	(-)	(-)	()		-	-
May 14	at Missouri State		Route 66 Stadium	-	(-)	(-)	()		-	-
May 15	at Missouri State		Route 66 Stadium	-	(-)	(-)	()		-	-
May 16	at Missouri State		Route 66 Stadium	-	(-)	(-)	()		-	-
May 18	Wake Forest		Liberty Baseball Stadium	-	(-)	(-)	()		-	-
May 20	New Mexico State		Liberty Baseball Stadium	-	(-)	(-)	()		-	-
May 21	New Mexico State		Liberty Baseball Stadium	-	(-)	(-)	()		-	-
May 22	New Mexico State		Liberty Baseball Stadium	-	(-)	(-)	()		-	-

Post-Season

C-USA Tournament
Date	Opponent	Seed	Site/Stadium	Score	Win	Loss	Save	Attendance	Overall Record	C-USAT Record
May 26–30			Don Sanders Stadium; Huntsville, TX	-	(-)	(-)	()		-	-

Legend: = Win = Loss = Cancelled
Bold = Liberty team member

Schedule Source:
