= 2024 Saint Joseph's Hawks baseball team =

American college baseball season

2024 Saint Joseph's Hawks baseball
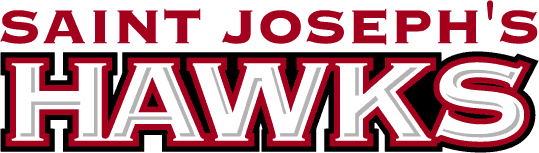
- Conference: Atlantic 10 Conference
- Record: 12–18 (3–5 A-10)
- Head coach: Fritz Hamburg (16th season)
- Assistant coach: Lee Saverio (4th season)
- Hitting coach: Doc Neiman (1st season)
- Pitching coach: Jeremy Hileman (1st season)
- Home stadium: Smithson Field

2024 Atlantic 10 Conference baseball standings
	Conf.				Overall
Team	W		L	PCT	W		L	PCT
Saint Louis ‍†‍‍	16	–	8	.667	37	–	16	.698
VCU ‍‍‡‍^{y}	15	–	8	.652	37	–	21	.638
Dayton ‍‍‍	14	–	9	.609	33	–	22	.600
George Washington ‍‍‍	13	–	11	.542	31	–	26	.544
Saint Joseph's ‍‍‍	13	–	11	.542	29	–	26	.527
Richmond ‍‍‍	13	–	11	.542	27	–	32	.458
UMass ‍‍‍	13	–	11	.542	24	–	29	.453
Rhode Island ‍‍‍	11	–	13	.458	19	–	28	.404
Davidson ‍‍‍	10	–	14	.417	24	–	28	.462
Fordham ‍‍‍	10	–	14	.417	19	–	33	.365
St. Bonaventure ‍‍‍	8	–	16	.333	18	–	31	.367
George Mason ‍‍‍	7	–	17	.292	21	–	32	.396
† – Conference champion ‡ – Tournament champion y – Invited to the NCAA tournament As of May 25, 2024; Rankings from D1Baseball

The 2024 Saint Joseph's Hawks baseball team represented Saint Joseph's University during the 2024 NCAA Division I baseball season. The Hawks played their home games at Smithson Field as a member of the Atlantic 10 Conference. They were led by head coach Fritz Hamburg, in his sixteenth season with the program.

Saint Joseph's entered the season as the defending Atlantic 10 regular season champions.

== Background ==
The 2023 was one of the most successful conference seasons in Saint Joseph's program history. Finishing with a record of 28–24–1 and an Atlantic 10 record of 17–7, Saint Joseph's won their first Atlantic 10 regular season title in program history. They were eliminated in the 2023 Atlantic 10 Conference baseball tournament after going 1–2, and did not receive an at-large berth to the 2023 NCAA Division I baseball tournament.

== Offseason ==
=== Departures ===
Saint Joseph's Departures
Name	Number	Pos.	Height	Weight	Year	Hometown	Notes
Cole Stetzar	2	RHP	6 ft 0 in (1.83 m)	220	Graduate	Scranton, Pennsylvania	Graduated
Cam Walker	3	INF	5 ft 8 in (1.73 m)	161	Senior	Canonsburg, Pennsylvania	Graduated
Luca Trigiani	4	INF	6 ft 1 in (1.85 m)	209	Senior	Brooklyn, New York	Graduated
Adam Fine	11	OF	5 ft 11 in (1.80 m)	165	Senior	Wynnewood, Pennsylvania	Graduated
Patrick Shearer	16	RHP	6 ft 0 in (1.83 m)	223	Senior	Dallas, Texas	Graduated
Mike Falco	24	RHP	6 ft 3 in (1.91 m)	209	Graduate	East Brunswick, New Jersey	Graduated
Brett Callahan	27	OF	6 ft 0 in (1.83 m)	192	Junior	Newark, Delaware	Drafted in the 2023 MLB draft
Nate Thomas	30	IN	6 ft 5 in (1.96 m)	217	Graduate	Hockessin, Delaware	Graduated
Nick Embleton	31	INF	6 ft 3 in (1.91 m)	204	Senior	Enola, Pennsylvania	Graduated
Nicholas Torres	37	LHP	6 ft 1 in (1.85 m)	190	Senior	Marlboro, New Jersey	Graduated
Travis Rinker	39	C	6 ft 2 in (1.88 m)	210	Senior	Monrovia, Maryland	Graduated
Peter Gallo	44	RHP	6 ft 4 in (1.93 m)	238	Senior	Asbury Park, New Jersey	Graduated

=== Transfers ===
Incoming transfers
Name	Number	Pos.	Height	Weight	Year	Hometown	Previous School
Colin Yablonski	37	RHP	6 ft 2 in (1.88 m)	196	Graduate	Lancaster, Pennsylvania	Coastal Carolina
Owen Petrich	43	INF	6 ft 2 in (1.88 m)	216	Sophomore	Doylestown, Pennsylvania	Delaware

=== 2023 MLB draft ===
Round	Pick	Player	Position	MLB Team
#13	#380	Brett Callahan	3B	Detroit Tigers

== Preseason ==
=== Preseason Atlantic 10 awards and honors ===
Ethan Bell, Hayden Moore, and Cole Smith were named to the All-Atlantic 10 Preseason team.

Preseason All-Atlantic 10 Team
Player	No.	Position	Class
Ryan Cesarini	47	OF	Junior
Domenic Picone	41	SP	Senior
Ryan Desanto	33	SP	Sophomore

=== Coaches poll ===
The coaches poll was released on February 14, 2024. Saint Joseph's was picked to finish third in the conference and received one first-place vote.

Coaches' Poll
Predicted finish	Team	Points
1	Saint Louis	125 (3)
2	George Mason	121 (2)
3	Saint Joseph's	114 (1)
4	Davidson	113 (2)
5	VCU	97 (2)
6	Dayton	96 (1)
7	Rhode Island	77 (1)
8	Richmond	63
9	George Washington	51
10	Fordham	38
11	UMass	22
12	St. Bonaventure	19

== Personnel ==
=== Starters ===
Lineup
Pos.	No.	Player.	Year
C	14	Jakob Reed	Senior
1B	35	Brandon Drapeau	Graduate
2B	15	Max Hitman	Senior
3B	44	Owen Petrich	Sophomore
SS	5	Ryan Weingartner	Sophomore
LF	17	Luke Zimmerman	Graduate
CF	8	Conlan Wall	Senior
RF	13	Ryan Picollo	Senior
DH	43	Justin Igoe	Senior

Weekend pitching rotation
Day	No.	Player.	Year
Friday	12	Will McCausland	Sophomore
Saturday		Ryan DeSanto	
Sunday		Domenic Picone	

=== Roster ===
2024 Saint Joseph's Hawks baseball team
Players
Coaches

#	Pos.	Name	B/T	Height	Weight	Year	Home town
2		Cole Stetzar	R/R	6 ft 0 in (1.83 m)	183 lb (83 kg)	Fr	Bay Village, OH
3	INF	Colin Myers	R/R	5 ft 8 in (1.73 m)	163 lb (74 kg)	Jr	Philadelphia, PA
4	C	Luke Parise	R/R	6 ft 1 in (1.85 m)	199 lb (90 kg)	Fr	Camp Hill, PA
5		Ryan Weingartner	R/R	5 ft 11 in (1.8 m)	184 lb (83 kg)	So	Berlin, NJ
6	RHP	Luke Smith	R/R	6 ft 1 in (1.85 m)	201 lb (91 kg)	Gr	Delran, NJ
8	OF	Conlan Wall	R/R	5 ft 8 in (1.73 m)	158 lb (72 kg)	Sr	Souderton, PA
9	OF	Nick Senior	R/R	5 ft 11 in (1.8 m)	171 lb (78 kg)	Sr	Cherry Hill, NJ
11	OF	Joey Gale	R/R	5 ft 11 in (1.8 m)	192 lb (87 kg)	Fr	Churchville, PA
12	RHP	Will McCausland	R/R	6 ft 0 in (1.83 m)	190 lb (86 kg)	So	Harleysville, PA
13	OF	Ryan Picollo	R/R	6 ft 4 in (1.93 m)	222 lb (101 kg)	Sr	Leawood, KS
14	C	Jakob Reed	L/R	6 ft 0 in (1.83 m)	187 lb (85 kg)	Sr	Yorba Linda, CA
15	INF	Max Hitman	R/R	5 ft 10 in (1.78 m)	192 lb (87 kg)	Sr	Norristown, PA
16	RHP	Tim Dickinson	R/R	6 ft 0 in (1.83 m)	183 lb (83 kg)	Sr	Glen Mills, PA
17	LHP	Luke Zimmerman	L/L	6 ft 1 in (1.85 m)	208 lb (94 kg)	Gr	Broomall, PA
18	RHP	Alec Rodriguez	R/R	6 ft 0 in (1.83 m)	191 lb (87 kg)	Gr	Cherry Hill, NJ
19	RHP	Frank Ciccone	R/R	6 ft 2 in (1.88 m)	208 lb (94 kg)	So	Hanover, NJ
20	RHP	Luke Gabrysh	R/R	6 ft 3 in (1.91 m)	199 lb (90 kg)	Jr	Wilmington, DE
22	RHP	Mike Picollo	R/R	6 ft 3 in (1.91 m)	213 lb (97 kg)	Gr	Leawood, KS
23	RHP	Matt McShane	R/R	6 ft 3 in (1.91 m)	222 lb (101 kg)	Jr	Bensalem, PA
24	LHP	Dylan Duke	R/R	5 ft 11 in (1.8 m)	209 lb (95 kg)	Fr	Norristown, PA
25	LHP	Richie Kerstetter	L/L	6 ft 0 in (1.83 m)	209 lb (95 kg)	So	Fairfield, CT
26	C	Carter Jagiela	R/R	6 ft 4 in (1.93 m)	224 lb (102 kg)	So	Telford, PA
28	RHP	David Owsik	R/R	6 ft 2 in (1.88 m)	201 lb (91 kg)	Sr	Downingtown, PA
30	OF	Bryce Gaines	R/R	6 ft 0 in (1.83 m)	185 lb (84 kg)	Fr	Alexandria, VVA
31	OF	Darius Adkins	R/R	6 ft 4 in (1.93 m)	194 lb (88 kg)	Fr	Philadelphia, PA
32	RHP	Sam Davies	R/R	6 ft 3 in (1.91 m)	207 lb (94 kg)	So	Ashburn, VA
33	LHP	Ryan DeSanto	L/L	6 ft 4 in (1.93 m)	218 lb (99 kg)	So	Frederick, MD
34	RHP	Drew DeSanto	R/R	6 ft 4 in (1.93 m)	204 lb (93 kg)	So	Frederick, MD
35	INF	Brandon Drapeau	R/R	6 ft 6 in (1.98 m)	215 lb (98 kg)	Gr	Mullica Hill, NJ
37	RHP	Colin Yablonski	R/R	6 ft 2 in (1.88 m)	196 lb (89 kg)	Gr	Lancaster, PA
38	C	Dean Bergmann	R/R	6 ft 0 in (1.83 m)	175 lb (79 kg)	Jr	Philadelphia, PA
40	LHP	Noah Tincher	L/L	6 ft 3 in (1.91 m)	193 lb (88 kg)	So	Hamilton, OH
41	RHP	Domenic Picone	R/R	5 ft 8 in (1.73 m)	183 lb (83 kg)	Sr	Garnet Valley, PA
43	C	Justin Igoe	R/R	5 ft 11 in (1.8 m)	214 lb (97 kg)	Sr	Ivyland, PA
44	INF	Owen Petrich	R/R	6 ft 2 in (1.88 m)	216 lb (98 kg)	So	Doylestown, PA
47	OF	Ryan Cesarini	L/R	5 ft 10 in (1.78 m)	205 lb (93 kg)	Jr	Archbald, PA
49	RHP	Ryan Basarab	R/R	6 ft 5 in (1.96 m)	224 lb (102 kg)	Sr	West Chester, PA
50	INF	Paul Kokol	L/R	6 ft 3 in (1.91 m)	217 lb (98 kg)	Sr	Ardmore, PA
52	INF	Antonio Dominici	R/R	5 ft 10 in (1.78 m)	181 lb (82 kg)	Fr	Millstone, NJ

Head coach

Fritz Hamburg

Assistant coach(es)

Doc Neiman
Jeremy Hileman
Lee Saverio

Legend

- (C) Team captain
- (S) Suspended
- (I) Ineligible
- Injured
- Current redshirt

Roster
Last update: March 21, 2024

== Game log ==
2024 Saint Joseph's Hawks baseball game log (12–18)
Regular season (12–18)

February (2–3)
Date	Opponent	Rank	Site/stadium	Score	Win	Loss	Save	TV	Attendance	Overall record	A10 record
February 16	Canisius*		Smithson Field; Merion, PA	**W** 6–5	**Yablonski** (1–0)	Abbott (0–1)	None	ESPN+	201	1–0	—
February 17	Canisius*		Smithson Field	**Cancelled (snow)**						1–0	—
February 18	Canisius*		Smithson Field	**Cancelled (snow)**						1–0	—
One Spartanburg, Inc. Baseball Classic
February 23	at Gardner–Webb*		Moss Stadium; Boiling Springs, NC	**W** 6–2	**McCausland** (1–0)	Brogdan (0–2)	None	ESPN+	156	2–0	—
February 24	at Presbyterian*		The Plex; Clinton, SC	**L** 2–3^{10}	T. Smith (1–0)	**L. Smith** (0–1)	None		243	2–1	—
February 25	at USC Upstate*		Harley Park; Spartanburg, SC	**L** 5–21	Ellingworth (1–0)	**Picone** (0–1)	None		119	2–2	—
February 27	Rutgers*		Smithson Field	**L** 9–15	Fauci (3–0)	**Yablonski** (1–1)	None	ESPN+	202	2–3	—

March (8–11)
Date	Opponent	Rank	Site/stadium	Score	Win	Loss	Save	TV	Attendance	Overall record	A10 record
March 1	at Bucknell*		Depew Field; Lewisburg, PA	**L** 14–16	Carroll (1–0)	**McCausland** (1–1)	Mulvey (3)	ESPN+	135	2–4	—
March 2	Bucknell*		Smithson Field	**W** 15–5^{5}	**DeSanto** (1–0)	Schultz (0–1)	None	ESPN+	225	3–4	—
March 3	Bucknell*		Smithson Field	**W** 9–5	**Picone** (1–1)	Maxwell (0–1)	None	ESPN+	206	4–4	—
March 5	Fairfield*		Smithson Field	**W** 4–3	**Yablonski** (2–1)	Helmstetter (0–2)	**Davies** (1)		134	5–4	—
March 6	Fairfield*		Smithson Field	**L** 5–19^{8}	Colagrande (1–0)	**McShane** (0–1)	None		132	5–5	—
March 8	at UNCW*		Brooks Field; Wilmington, NC	**L** 5–6	Marshburn (2–0)	**Gabrysh** (0–1)	Craig (1)	FloBaseball	993	5–6	—
March 9	at UNCW*		Brooks Field	**L** 2–3	Kane (1–1)	**Smith** (0–2)	None	FloBaseball	932	5–7	—
March 10	at UNCW*		Brooks Field	**L** 3–4	Marshburn (3–0)	**Yablonski** (2–2)	None	FloBaseball	1,158	5–8	—
March 12	at Lehigh*		J. David Walker Field; Bethlehem, PA	**W** 8–2	**Yablonski** (3–2)	Ermigiotti (1–1)	None		151	6–8	—
March 15	Monmouth*		Smithson Field	**L** 5–7	Benzinger (1–1)	**McShane** (0–2)	None		224	6–9	—
March 16	Monmouth*		Smithson Field	**W** 10–6	**Smith** (1–2)	Carlin (1–2)	None		316	7–9	—
March 17	Monmouth*		Smithson Field	**W** 7–6	**McShane** (1–2)	Benzinger (1–2)	None		400	8–9	—
March 20	Navy*		Smithson Field	**L** 7–17^{7}	Murtha (1–0)	**Owsik** (0–1)	None		225	8–10	—
March 22	at Kent State*		Schoonover Stadium; Kent, OH	**L** 2–3	Kartsonas (3–2)	**McCausland** (1–1)	Roebuck (1)	Hudl	342	8–11	—
March 23	at Kent State*		Schoonover Stadium	**L** 2–3	Kolenda (1–3)	**Gabrysh** (0–2)	None	Hudl	320	8–12	—
March 24	at Kent State*		Schoonover Stadium	**W** 5–0	**Picone** (2–1)	Miceli (0–1)	None	Hudl	323	9–12	—
Liberty Bell Classic
March 26	at Lafayette*		Kamine Stadium; Easton, PA	**L** 7–13	Maurer (1–0)	**Yablonski** (3–3)	None		107	9–13	—
March 28	at Davidson		Henry Wilson Jr. Field; Davidson, NC	**L** 8–9	Ban (1–0)	**Owsik** (0–2)	None		333	9–14	0–1
March 29	at Davidson		Henry Wilson Jr. Field	**L** 3–14	Cavanaugh (1–3)	**DeSanto** (1–1)	Fix (1)		512	9–15	0–2
March 30	at Davidson		Henry Wilson Jr. Field	**W** 15–8	**Picone** (3–1)	Feczko (2–4)	**Rodriguez** (1)		478	10–15	1–2

April (2–3)
Date	Opponent	Rank	Site/stadium	Score	Win	Loss	Save	TV	Attendance	Overall record	A10 record
Liberty Bell Classic
April 3	vs. Penn*		Smithson Field	**Canceled (inclement weather)**						10–15	—
April 5	Saint Louis		Smithson Field	**L** 2–10	Holmes (6–1)	**McCausland** (1–3)	Bell (4)	ESPN+	221	10–16	1–3
April 6	Saint Louis		Smithson Field	**W** 9–1	**DeSanto** (2–1)	Yarberry (4–3)	McShane (1)	ESPN+	306	11–16	2–3
April 7	Saint Louis		Smithson Field	**W** 7–3	**Picone** (4–1)	Chaffin (1–2)	**Rodriguez** (2)	ESPN+	367	12–16	3–3
April 10	Delaware*		Smithson Field	**Canceled (inclement weather)**						12–16	—
April 12	at Rhode Island		Bill Beck Field; Kingston, RI	**L** 3–6	Jones (1–0)	**McCausland** (1–4)	Ureña (1)		91	12–17	3–4
April 13	at Rhode Island		Bill Beck Field	**L** 2–7	Sposato (1–3)	**DeSanto** (2–2)	None		133	12–18	3–5
April 14	at Rhode Island		Bill Beck Field								
April 17	at Penn*		Meiklejohn Stadium; Philadelphia, PA								—
April 19	St. Bonaventure		Smithson Field								
April 20	St. Bonaventure		Smithson Field								
April 21	St. Bonaventure		Smithson Field								
April 23	at Delaware*		Bob Hannah Stadium; Newark, DE								—
April 26	at UMass		Earl Lorden Field; Amherst, MA								
April 27	at UMass		Earl Lorden Field								
April 28	at UMass		Earl Lorden Field								
April 30	at Villanova*		Villanova Ballpark; Plymouth Meeting, PA								—

May (0–0)
Date	Opponent	Rank	Site/stadium	Score	Win	Loss	Save	TV	Attendance	Overall record	A10 record
May 3	at Fordham		Houlihan Park; The Bronx, NY								
May 4	at Fordham		Houlihan Park								
May 5	at Fordham		Houlihan Park								
May 10	George Mason		Smithson Field								
May 11	George Mason		Smithson Field								
May 12	George Mason		Smithson Field								
May 14	Villanova*		Smithson Field								—
May 16	George Washington		Smithson Field								
May 17	George Washington		Smithson Field								
May 18	George Washington		Smithson Field								

Post-Season

Atlantic 10 tournament
Date	Opponent	Rank	Site/stadium	Score	Win	Loss	Save	TV	Attendance	Overall record	A10T record
May 21–25	vs. TBD		Capital One Park; Tysons, VA					ESPN+			

*Denotes non–conference game • Schedule source • Rankings based on the teams' current ranking in the D1Baseball poll
**W** Saint Joseph's win • **L** Saint Joseph's loss • **T** Saint Joseph's tie • Postponement or cancellation • **Bold** denotes Saint Joseph's player

== Tournaments ==
=== Atlantic 10 tournament ===
Atlantic 10 tournament teams
(1) Saint Louis Billikens	(2) VCU Rams	(3) Dayton Flyers	(4) Richmond Spiders	(5) George Washington Revolutionaries	(6) UMass Minutemen	(7) Saint Joseph's Hawks

Upper round 1	Upper round 2	Upper final	Final
May 22 – 11:00 a.m.
1	Saint Louis	10
May 21 – 11:00 a.m.
4	Richmond	13
4	Richmond	12
May 24 – 11:00 a.m.
5	George Washington	4
4	Richmond	7
May 21 – 3:00 p.m.
2	VCU	13
3	Dayton	4
May 22 – 3:00 p.m.
6	UMass	1
3	Dayton	3
May 21 – 7:00 p.m.
2	VCU	11
2	VCU	4
May 25 – 12:00 p.m. & 4:00 p.m.
7	Saint Joseph's	2
2	VCU	16	–
4	Richmond	1	–
Lower round 1	Lower round 2	Lower round 3	Lower final
May 23 – 11:00 a.m.
May 22 – 7:00 p.m.	1	Saint Louis	0	May 24 – 3:00 p.m.
6	UMass	2	7	St. Joseph's	14	May 23 – 7:00 p.m.	4	Richmond	14
7	St. Joseph's	12	7	St. Joseph's	13	7	St. Joseph's	6
May 23 – 3:00 p.m.	5	George Washington	12
5	George Washington	9
3	Dayton	1

First round (Game 3)
(7) Saint Joseph's Hawks	vs.	(2) VCU Rams

May 21, 2024 7:00 pm (EDT) at Capital One Park in Tysons, Virginia
Team	1	2	3	4	5	6	7	8	9	R	H	E
(7) Saint Joseph's	0	0	1	1	0	0	0	0	0	2	6	0
(2) VCU	2	0	0	0	0	0	1	1	X	4	8	0
WP: Brian Curley (6–0) LP: Colin Yablonski (4–5) Sv: Owen Tappy (5); Home runs: STJ: Ryan Weingartner; VCU: Brandon Eike, Eli Weisner; Attendance: 301

Lower round 1 (Game 6)
(7) Saint Joseph's Hawks	vs.	(6) UMass Minutemen

== Rankings ==
Ranking movements Legend: ██ Increase in ranking ██ Decrease in ranking — = Not ranked RV = Received votes
	Week																			
Poll	Pre	1	2	3	4	5	6	7	8	9	10	11	12	13	14	15	16	17	18	Final
Coaches'	—	—*	—	—	—	—	—													
Baseball America	—	—	—	—	—	—	—													
Collegiate Baseball^	—	—	—	—	—	—	—													
NCBWA†	RV	—	—	—	—	—	—													
D1Baseball	—	—	—	—	—	—	—													

^ Collegiate Baseball ranked 40 teams in their preseason poll, but only ranked 30 teams weekly during the season.
† NCBWA ranks 30 teams in their preseason poll, but only ranks 25 teams weekly during the season.
* A new poll was not released for this week, so for comparison purposes, the previous week's ranking is inserted in this week's slot.
