= 2024 Atlantic 10 Conference baseball tournament =

American college baseball tournament

- Teams: 7
- Format: Double-elimination
- Finals site: Capital One Park; Tysons, Virginia
- Champions: VCU (4th title)
- Winning coach: Bradley LeCroy (1st title)
- MVP: Brandon Eike (VCU)
- Television: ESPN+

2024 Atlantic 10 Conference baseball standings
	Conf.				Overall
Team	W		L	PCT	W		L	PCT
Saint Louis ‍†‍‍	16	–	8	.667	37	–	16	.698
VCU ‍‍‡‍^{y}	15	–	8	.652	37	–	21	.638
Dayton ‍‍‍	14	–	9	.609	33	–	22	.600
George Washington ‍‍‍	13	–	11	.542	31	–	26	.544
Saint Joseph's ‍‍‍	13	–	11	.542	29	–	26	.527
Richmond ‍‍‍	13	–	11	.542	27	–	32	.458
UMass ‍‍‍	13	–	11	.542	24	–	29	.453
Rhode Island ‍‍‍	11	–	13	.458	19	–	28	.404
Davidson ‍‍‍	10	–	14	.417	24	–	28	.462
Fordham ‍‍‍	10	–	14	.417	19	–	33	.365
St. Bonaventure ‍‍‍	8	–	16	.333	18	–	31	.367
George Mason ‍‍‍	7	–	17	.292	21	–	32	.396
† – Conference champion ‡ – Tournament champion y – Invited to the NCAA tournament As of May 25, 2024; Rankings from D1Baseball

The 2024 Atlantic 10 Conference baseball tournament was the 46th edition of the tournament, which took place at Capital One Park in Tysons, Virginia. The tournament was a double-elimination tournament, and began on May 21 and concluded on May 25.

George Mason were the defending champions, but failed to qualify for the tournament. VCU won the tournament, their third in the past four seasons, defeating their crosstown rivals, Richmond, in the final.

== Seeding and format ==
The tournament used the same format adopted in 2014, with the top seven finishers from the regular season seeded one through seven. The top seed received a single bye while remaining seeds played on the first day.

Saint Louis won the regular season and was the top seed in the tournament.

Seed	School	Conference	Tiebreaker
1	Saint Louis	16–8	
2	VCU	15–8	
3	Dayton	13–8	
4	Richmond	13–11	
5	George Washington	13–11	
6	UMass	13–11	
7	Saint Joseph's	13–11	

== Bracket ==
Upper round 1	Upper round 2	Upper final	Final
May 22 – 11:00 a.m.
1	Saint Louis	10
May 21 – 11:00 a.m.
4	Richmond	13
4	Richmond	12
May 24 – 11:00 a.m.
5	George Washington	4
4	Richmond	7
May 21 – 3:00 p.m.
2	VCU	13
3	Dayton	4
May 22 – 3:00 p.m.
6	UMass	1
3	Dayton	3
May 21 – 7:00 p.m.
2	VCU	11
2	VCU	4
May 25 – 12:00 p.m. & 4:00 p.m.
7	Saint Joseph's	2
2	VCU	16	–
4	Richmond	1	–
Lower round 1	Lower round 2	Lower round 3	Lower final
May 23 – 11:00 a.m.
May 22 – 7:00 p.m.	1	Saint Louis	0	May 24 – 3:00 p.m.
6	UMass	2	7	St. Joseph's	14	May 23 – 7:00 p.m.	4	Richmond	14
7	St. Joseph's	12	7	St. Joseph's	13	7	St. Joseph's	6
May 23 – 3:00 p.m.	5	George Washington	12
5	George Washington	9
3	Dayton	1

== All-Tournament Team ==
The following players were named to the All-Tournament Team.

Pos.	Player	School
C	Jack Arcamone	Richmond
1B	Jordan Jaffee	Richmond
2B	Nick Cosentino	VCU
SS	William Bean	VCU
3B	Brandon Eike	VCU
OF	Phil Bernstein	Richmond
OF	Ryan Cesarini	Saint Joseph's
OF	Eli Weisner	VCU
SP	Ryan DeSanto	Saint Joseph's
SP	Christian Gordon	VCU
SP	Kyle Roche	Richmond
RP	Michael Foltz	George Washington

Bold is MVP.
