= 2024 Rhode Island Rams baseball team =

College Baseball Season

2024 Rhode Island Rams baseball
- Conference: Atlantic 10 Conference
- Record: 11–17 (4–4 A10)
- Head coach: Raphael Cerrato (10th season)
- Associate head coach: Sean O'Brien (10th season)
- Assistant coach: Kevin Heiss (3rd season)
- Pitching coach: David Fischer (3rd season)
- Home stadium: Bill Beck Field

2024 Atlantic 10 Conference baseball standings
	Conf.				Overall
Team	W		L	PCT	W		L	PCT
Saint Louis ‍†‍‍	16	–	8	.667	37	–	16	.698
VCU ‍‍‡‍^{y}	15	–	8	.652	37	–	21	.638
Dayton ‍‍‍	14	–	9	.609	33	–	22	.600
George Washington ‍‍‍	13	–	11	.542	31	–	26	.544
Saint Joseph's ‍‍‍	13	–	11	.542	29	–	26	.527
Richmond ‍‍‍	13	–	11	.542	27	–	32	.458
UMass ‍‍‍	13	–	11	.542	24	–	29	.453
Rhode Island ‍‍‍	11	–	13	.458	19	–	28	.404
Davidson ‍‍‍	10	–	14	.417	24	–	28	.462
Fordham ‍‍‍	10	–	14	.417	19	–	33	.365
St. Bonaventure ‍‍‍	8	–	16	.333	18	–	31	.367
George Mason ‍‍‍	7	–	17	.292	21	–	32	.396
† – Conference champion ‡ – Tournament champion y – Invited to the NCAA tournament As of May 25, 2024; Rankings from D1Baseball

The 2024 Rhode Island Rams baseball team represent the University of Rhode Island during the 2024 NCAA Division I baseball season. The Rams play their home games at Bill Beck Field as a member of the Atlantic 10 Conference. They are led by head coach Raphael Cerrato, in his eighth year as manager.

== Previous season ==
The 2023 team finished the season with a 23–20 (13–11) record. The Rams went 0–2 in the 2023 Atlantic 10 Conference baseball tournament.

== Preseason ==
=== Coaches poll ===
The coaches poll was released on February 14, 2024. Rhode Island was picked to finish seventh in the conference and received one first-place votes.

Coaches' Poll
Predicted finish	Team	Points
1	Saint Louis	125 (3)
2	George Mason	121 (2)
3	Saint Joseph's	114 (1)
4	Davidson	113 (2)
5	VCU	97 (2)
6	Dayton	96 (1)
7	Rhode Island	77 (1)
8	Richmond	63
9	George Washington	51
10	Fordham	38
11	UMass	22
12	St. Bonaventure	19

== Regular season ==
=== Schedule and results ===
2024 Rhode Island Rams baseball game log (5–12)
Regular season (5–12)

February (1–5)
Date	Opponent	Rank	Site/stadium	Score	Win	Loss	Save	TV	Attendance	Overall record	A10 record
February 16	at UTRGV*		UTRGV Baseball Stadium; Edinburg, TX	W 4–3^{11}	Hughes (1–0)	Sanchez (0–1)	None	ESPN+	1,495	1–0	—
February 17	at UTRGV*		UTRGV Baseball Stadium	L 3–13	Valdez (1–0)	Levesque (0–1)	None	ESPN+	1,607	1–1	—
February 18	at UTRGV*		UTRGV Baseball Stadium	L 1–15	Rodriguez (1–0)	Sposato (0–1)	None	ESPN+	1,091	1–2	—
February 23	at Virginia Tech*		English Field; Blacksburg, VA	L 3–18	Renfrow (2–0)	Morris (0–1)	None	ACCNX	897	1–3	—
February 24	at Virginia Tech*		English Field	L 2–7	Shoemaker (1–0)	Hsu (0–1)	None	ACCNX	946	1–4	—
February 25	at Virginia Tech*		English Field	L 2–14	Stieg (1–1)	Grotyohann (0–1)	None	ACCNX	916	1–5	—

March (4–11)
Date	Opponent	Rank	Site/stadium	Score	Win	Loss	Save	TV	Attendance	Overall record	A10 record
March 1	at Washington State*		Bailey–Brayton Field; Pullman, WA	L 4–10	Wilford (2–0)	Grotyohann (0–2)	None	P12N	878	1–6	—
March 2	at Washington State*		Bailey–Brayton Field	L 7–17^{7}	Jones (1–1)	Sposato (0–2)	None	P12N	789	1–7	—
March 3	at Washington State*		Bailey–Brayton Field	W 6–3	Hughes (2–0)	Grillo (0–1)	None	P12N	813	2–7	—
March 5	Sacred Heart*		Bill Beck Field; Kingston, RI	Canceled (inclement weather)						2–7	—
March 8	at No. 4 Texas A&M*		Olsen Field; College Station, TX	L 0–11	Prager (4–0)	Grotyohann (0–3)	None	SECN+	5,480	2–8	—
March 9	at No. 4 Texas A&M*		Olsen Field	L 0–6	Rudis (1–0)	Maloney (0–1)	None	SECN+	5,964	2–9	—
March 10	at No. 4 Texas A&M*		Olsen Field	L 11–12^{10}	Aschenbeck (2–0)	Heon (0–1)	None	SECN+	5,857	2–10	—
March 13	at UMass Lowell*		LeLacheur Park; Lowell, MA	Canceled (inclement weather)						2–10	—
March 15	at Northeastern*		Friedman Diamond; Boston, MA	L 4–15	Gigliotti (2–0)	Grotyohann (0–4)	None	FloBaseball	112	2–11	—
March 16	Northeastern*		Bill Beck Field	W 7–1	Maloney (1–1)	Scotti (3–2)	None	ESPN+	302	3–11	—
March 17	Northeastern*		Bill Beck Field	L 9–11	McGrath (1–0)	Johnston (0–1)	Beauchesne (1)	ESPN+	286	3–12	—
March 19	UConn*		Bill Beck Field	W 4–1	Hsu (1–1)	Cinnella (0–2)	Heon (1)	ESPN+	142	4–12	—
March 20	Stonehill*		Bill Beck Field	W 19–15	Johnston (1–1)	Friedman (0–1)	None	ESPN+	137	5–12	—
March 22	St. Bonaventure		Bill Beck Field	Canceled (inclement weather)						5–12	0–0
March 23	St. Bonaventure		Bill Beck Field	Canceled (inclement weather)						5–12	0–0
March 24	St. Bonaventure		Bill Beck Field	Canceled (inclement weather)						5–12	0–0
March 26	at Quinnipiac*		Quinnipiac Baseball Field; Hamden, CT	L 0–4	Jasek (1–0)	Hsu (1–2)	None	ESPN+	155	5–13	—
March 28	at Saint Louis		Billiken Sports Center; St. Louis, MO	L 2–3	Bell (1–1)	Fernandez (0–1)	None	ESPN+	67	5–14	0–1
March 29	at Saint Louis		Billiken Sports Center	L 1–8	Yarberry (4–2)	Sposato (0–2)	None	ESPN+	57	5–15	0–2
March 30	at Saint Louis		Billiken Sports Center	L 3–7	Evan (1–1)	Johnston (1–2)	None	ESPN+	53	5–16	0–3

April (6–1)
Date	Opponent	Rank	Site/stadium	Score	Win	Loss	Save	TV	Attendance	Overall record	A10 record
April 3	Boston College*		Bill Beck Field	Canceled (inclement weather)						5–16	—
April 5	UMass		Bill Beck Field	W 6–1	Maloney (2–1)	Belliveau (2–4)	None	ESPN+	113	6–16	1–3
April 6	UMass		Bill Beck Field	L 2–4	Lints (2–0)	Grotyohann (0–5)	Jensen (1)	ESPN+	97	6–17	1–4
April 7	UMass		Bill Beck Field	W 5–3	Ureña (1–0)	Bigelow (1–2)	Hughes (1)	ESPN+	124	7–17	2–4
April 9	Brown*		Bill Beck Field	W 5–2	Johnston (2–2	Keel (1–3)	Hughes (2)		115	8–17	—
April 10	Quinnipiac*		Bill Beck Field	W 14–13	Grotyohann (1–5)	Manelski (0–1)	Fernandez (1)		82	9–17	—
April 12	Saint Joseph's		Bill Beck Field	W 6–3	Jones (1–0)	McCausland (1–4)	Ureña (1)	ESPN+	91	10–17	3–4
April 13	Saint Joseph's		Bill Beck Field	W 7–2	Sposato (1–3)	DeSanto (2–2)	None	ESPN+	133	11–17	4–4
April 14	Saint Joseph's		Bill Beck Field					ESPN+			
April 16	at Bryant*		Conaty Park; Smithfield, RI								—
April 19	at George Washington		Barcroft Park; Arlington, VA					ESPN+			
April 20	at George Washington		Barcroft Park					ESPN+			
April 21	at George Washington		Barcroft Park					ESPN+			
April 23	Bryant*		Bill Beck Field								—
April 26	Fordham		Bill Beck Field					ESPN+			
April 27	Fordham		Bill Beck Field					ESPN+			
April 28	Fordham		Bill Beck Field					ESPN+			

May (0–0)
Date	Opponent	Rank	Site/stadium	Score	Win	Loss	Save	TV	Attendance	Overall record	A10 record
May 3	at Davidson		Wilson Field; Davidson, NC								
May 4	at Davidson		Wilson Field								
May 5	at Davidson		Wilson Field								
May 10	Richmond		Bill Beck Field								
May 11	Richmond		Bill Beck Field								
May 12	Richmond		Bill Beck Field								
May 16	at Dayton		Woerner Field; Dayton, OH								
May 17	at Dayton		Woerner Field								
May 18	at Dayton		Woerner Field								

Postseason (0–0)

Atlantic 10 Tournament (0–0)
Date	TV	Opponent	Rank	Stadium	Score	Win	Loss	Save	Attendance	Overall	A10T Record	Source
May 21–25		vs. TBD		Capital One Park; Tysons, Virginia								

Legend: = Win = Loss = Canceled
* = Non-conference game Bold =Rhode Island team member
Rankings are based on the team's current ranking in the D1Baseball poll.

== Rankings ==
Ranking movements Legend: — = Not ranked
	Week																			
Poll	Pre	1	2	3	4	5	6	7	8	9	10	11	12	13	14	15	16	17	18	Final
Coaches'	—	—*	—	—	—	—	—													
Baseball America	—	—	—	—	—	—	—													
Collegiate Baseball^	—	—	—	—	—	—	—													
NCBWA†	—	—	—	—	—	—	—													
D1Baseball	—	—	—	—	—	—	—													

^ Collegiate Baseball ranked 40 teams in their preseason poll, but only ranked 30 teams weekly during the season.
† NCBWA ranks 30 teams in their preseason poll, but only ranks 25 teams weekly during the season.
* A new poll was not released for this week, so for comparison purposes, the previous week's ranking is inserted in this week's slot.
