= 2024 VCU Rams baseball team =

American college baseball season

2024 VCU Rams baseball

Atlantic 10 tournament champions

Greenville Regional, 1–2
- Conference: Atlantic 10 Conference
- Record: 38–23 (15–8 A-10)
- Head coach: Bradley LeCroy (2nd season)
- Assistant coaches: Andrew Cox (2nd season); Sean Thompson (1st season); Andrew Llewellyn (4th season)
- Home stadium: The Diamond

2024 Atlantic 10 Conference baseball standings
	Conf.				Overall
Team	W		L	PCT	W		L	PCT
Saint Louis ‍†‍‍	16	–	8	.667	37	–	16	.698
VCU ‍‍‡‍^{y}	15	–	8	.652	37	–	21	.638
Dayton ‍‍‍	14	–	9	.609	33	–	22	.600
George Washington ‍‍‍	13	–	11	.542	31	–	26	.544
Saint Joseph's ‍‍‍	13	–	11	.542	29	–	26	.527
Richmond ‍‍‍	13	–	11	.542	27	–	32	.458
UMass ‍‍‍	13	–	11	.542	24	–	29	.453
Rhode Island ‍‍‍	11	–	13	.458	19	–	28	.404
Davidson ‍‍‍	10	–	14	.417	24	–	28	.462
Fordham ‍‍‍	10	–	14	.417	19	–	33	.365
St. Bonaventure ‍‍‍	8	–	16	.333	18	–	31	.367
George Mason ‍‍‍	7	–	17	.292	21	–	32	.396
† – Conference champion ‡ – Tournament champion y – Invited to the NCAA tournament As of May 25, 2024; Rankings from D1Baseball

The 2024 VCU Rams baseball team represented Virginia Commonwealth University during the 2024 NCAA Division I baseball season. The Rams played their home games at The Diamond as a member of the Atlantic 10 Conference. They were led by head coach Bradley LeCroy, in his second season with the program.

== Previous season ==
The 2023 VCU Rams baseball team posted a 25–30 (11–13) regular season record, in their first season with LeCroy managing the team following former head coach, Shawn Stiffler's departure to coach Notre Dame. The Rams failed to qualify for the Atlantic 10 Conference baseball tournament, and posted their first losing overall record and their first overall losing conference record since 2011.

== Preseason ==
=== Preseason Atlantic 10 awards and honors ===
Preseason awards were announced February 2024.

Preseason All-Atlantic 10 Team
Player	No.	Position	Class	Selector
Brandon Eike	3	INF	Senior	Perfect Game

Preseason Atlantic 10 Player of the Year
Player	No.	Position	Class	Selector
Brandon Eike	3	INF	Senior	D1Baseball

=== Coaches poll ===
The coaches poll was released on February 14, 2024. VCU was picked to finish fifth in the conference and received two first-place votes.

Coaches' Poll
Predicted finish	Team	Points
1	Saint Louis	125 (3)
2	George Mason	121 (2)
3	Saint Joseph's	114 (1)
4	Davidson	113 (2)
5	VCU	97 (2)
6	Dayton	96 (1)
7	Rhode Island	77 (1)
8	Richmond	63
9	George Washington	51
10	Fordham	38
11	UMass	22
12	St. Bonaventure	19

== Personnel ==
=== Starters ===
Lineup
Pos.	No.	Player.	Year
C	37	Nic Ericsson	RS-Senior
1B	17	Chris McHugh	Freshman
2B	13	Casey Kleinman	Junior
3B	3	Brandon Eike	Senior
SS	10	William Bean	Senior
LF	15	Ethan Iannuzzi	Graduate
CF	26	Cooper Benzin	RS-Senior
RF	22	Aden Hill	Sophomore
DH	25	Jake Thilges	RS-Junior

Weekend pitching rotation
Day	No.	Player.	Year
Friday	46	Campbell Ellis	Senior
Saturday	1	Christian Gordon	Senior
Sunday	39	Zachary Peters	Sophomore

=== Roster ===
2024 VCU Rams baseball team
Players
Coaches

#	Pos.	Name	B/T	Height	Weight	Year	Home town
0	LHP	Isaiah Wyatt	L/L	6 ft 0 in (1.83 m)	140 lb (64 kg)	Fr	Richmond, VA
1	LHP	Christian Gordon	L/L	6 ft 0 in (1.83 m)	180 lb (82 kg)	Sr	Amherst, VA
3	INF	Brandon Eike	R/R	6 ft 0 in (1.83 m)	220 lb (100 kg)	Jr	Powhatan, VA
4	INF	Ethan Brooks	R/R	5 ft 11 in (1.8 m)	160 lb (73 kg)	So	Glen Allen, VA
6	INF	Griffin Boone	R/R	6 ft 0 in (1.83 m)	180 lb (82 kg)	RS Jr	Montclair, VA
8	INF	Harrison Long	R/R	5 ft 10 in (1.78 m)	175 lb (79 kg)	Jr	Sarasota, FL
9	INF	Trent Adelman	R/R	6 ft 0 in (1.83 m)	200 lb (91 kg)	Fr	Darnestown, MD
10	INF	William Bean	R/R	5 ft 11 in (1.8 m)	180 lb (82 kg)	Sr	Great Falls, VA
12	OF	Will Epstein	R/R	6 ft 2 in (1.88 m)	190 lb (86 kg)	Fr	Chapel Hill, NC
13	C	Casey Kleinman	R/R	5 ft 8 in (1.73 m)	170 lb (77 kg)	Jr	Westlake Village, CA
14	RHP	Everett Vaughn	R/R	6 ft 3 in (1.91 m)	210 lb (95 kg)	Jr	Moseley, VA
15	OF	Ethan Iannuzzi	R/R	6 ft 1 in (1.85 m)	200 lb (91 kg)	Gr	Chesterfield, VA
16	OF	Owen Tappy	R/R	6 ft 1 in (1.85 m)	185 lb (84 kg)	Gr	Charlotte, NC
17	INF	Chris McHugh	R/R	6 ft 3 in (1.91 m)	200 lb (91 kg)	Fr	Commack, NY
19	RHP	Nick Frers	R/R	6 ft 2 in (1.88 m)	190 lb (86 kg)	Fr	Vancouver, BC
21	OF	Eli Weisner	R/R	6 ft 3 in (1.91 m)	195 lb (88 kg)	Gr	Glen Allen, VA
22	OF	Aden Hill	L/R	5 ft 10 in (1.78 m)	200 lb (91 kg)	So	Mechanicsville, MD
23	RHP	Kyras Dawson	R/R	6 ft 2 in (1.88 m)	175 lb (79 kg)	Jr	Washington, DC
24	INF	James McGrady	S/R	5 ft 11 in (1.8 m)	190 lb (86 kg)	Jr	Norfolk, VA
25	INF	Jake Thilges	R/R	6 ft 2 in (1.88 m)	212 lb (96 kg)	RS Jr	Johnston, IA
26	OF	Cooper Benzin	R/R	6 ft 3 in (1.91 m)	195 lb (88 kg)	RS Sr	Ashland, VA
27	C	Jake Wortman	S/R	6 ft 2 in (1.88 m)	210 lb (95 kg)	Gr	Fredericksburg, VA
28		Devan Zirwas	L/L	6 ft 3 in (1.91 m)	210 lb (95 kg)	RS Fr	Imperial, PA
29	RHP	Phil Forbes V	L/R	6 ft 0 in (1.83 m)	185 lb (84 kg)	So	Newport News, VA
30	RHP	Aiden Milburn	R/R	6 ft 0 in (1.83 m)	215 lb (98 kg)	Fr	Baldwinsville, NY
31	RHP	Evan Bert	R/R	6 ft 0 in (1.83 m)	195 lb (88 kg)	So	Harrisonburg, VA
32	RHP	Nick Cosentino	R/R	6 ft 3 in (1.91 m)	220 lb (100 kg)	Sr	Pittsburgh, PA
33	OF	Anderson Fulk	L/L	6 ft 3 in (1.91 m)	207 lb (94 kg)	Jr	York, SC
34	OF	Bobby Lane	L/L	6 ft 0 in (1.83 m)	195 lb (88 kg)	RS So	Trafford, PA
35	RHP	Joe Gomez	R/R	5 ft 10 in (1.78 m)	180 lb (82 kg)	Fr	Rancho Cucamonga, CA
36	RHP	Brendan Erka	R/R	6 ft 2 in (1.88 m)	195 lb (88 kg)	Jr	Allison Park, PA
37	C	Nic Ericsson	R/R	6 ft 2 in (1.88 m)	200 lb (91 kg)	RS Sr	Woodbridge, VA
38	LHP	Will Goleski	L/L	6 ft 3 in (1.91 m)	195 lb (88 kg)	Jr	Mechanicsville, VA
39	RHP	Zachary Peters	R/R	6 ft 3 in (1.91 m)	200 lb (91 kg)	So	North Haven, CT
40	LHP	Will Gross	L/L	5 ft 11 in (1.8 m)	180 lb (82 kg)	Jr	El Paso, TX
41	RHP	Brian Curley	R/R	5 ft 10 in (1.78 m)	200 lb (91 kg)	So	Midlothian, VA
42	RHP	Will Greer	R/R	6 ft 3 in (1.91 m)	225 lb (102 kg)	Gr	Cohasset, MA
43	LHP	Cade Dressler	L/L	6 ft 2 in (1.88 m)	225 lb (102 kg)	Jr	Mifflinburg, PA
44		Cam Nuckols	R/R	6 ft 4 in (1.93 m)	225 lb (102 kg)	So	Chesterfield, VA
45	RHP	Jack Hoeymans	R/R	6 ft 3 in (1.91 m)	215 lb (98 kg)	RS Jr	McLean, VA
46	LHP	Campbell Ellis	L/L	6 ft 4 in (1.93 m)	215 lb (98 kg)	Sr	Georgetown, ON
50	RHP	Justin Humenay	R/R	6 ft 0 in (1.83 m)	195 lb (88 kg)	Sr	Montreal, QC
51		Andrew Powers	L/L	6 ft 3 in (1.91 m)	215 lb (98 kg)	Fr	Bethesda, MD
52	LHP	Michael Walsh	L/L	6 ft 1 in (1.85 m)	195 lb (88 kg)	RS So	Leesburg, VA
55	RHP	Maison Martinez	R/R	6 ft 2 in (1.88 m)	210 lb (95 kg)	So	Lake Worth, FL

Head coach

Bradley LeCroy

Assistant coach(es)

Andrew Cox
Sean Thompson
Andrew Llewellyn

Legend

- (C) Team captain
- (S) Suspended
- (I) Ineligible
- Injured
- Current redshirt

Roster
Last update: January 4, 2024

=== Coaching staff ===
2024 VCU Rams baseball coaching staff
Name	Position	Seasons at VCU	Alma mater
Bradley LeCroy	Head coach	2	Clemson University (2000)
Sean Thompson	Assistant Coach	2	Virginia Commonwealth University (2018)
Andrew Cox	Assistant Coach	1	Trevecca Nazarene University (2019)
Andrew Llewellyn	Assistant Coach	4	Wingate University (2020)

== Offseason ==
=== Departures ===
VCU Departures
Name	Number	Pos.	Height	Weight	Year	Hometown	Notes
Scottie O'Bryan	9	OF	6 ft 0 in (1.83 m)	195 pounds (88 kg)	RS Junior	Jamesville, New York	Did not return
Jessie Robinson Jr.	12	OF	6 ft 2 in (1.88 m)	190 pounds (86 kg)	Sophomore	Short Pump, Virginia	Transferred to Lynn
AJ Mathis	13	OF	5 ft 8 in (1.73 m)	165 pounds (75 kg)	RS Senior	Tampa, Florida	Graduated
Gavyn Boyle	16	OF	6 ft 2 in (1.88 m)	200 pounds (91 kg)	Freshman	Gasport, New York	Transferred to Niagara CC
Casey Gibbs	17	C	6 ft 0 in (1.83 m)	170 pounds (77 kg)	Sophomore	Olney, Maryland	Transferred to Morningside
Macho Santiago	20	INF					
Logan Amiss	21	OF	5 ft 11 in (1.80 m)	205 pounds (93 kg)	RS Senior	Powhatan, Virginia	Graduated
James Gladden	24	RHP	6 ft 0 in (1.83 m)	185 pounds (84 kg)	Freshman	Baltimore, Maryland	Transferred to Maryland
Nick Frazier	27	RHP	5 ft 9 in (1.75 m)	170 pounds (77 kg)	Sophomore	Vienna, Virginia	Transferred to Wright State
Mason Delane	33	RHP	6 ft 4 in (1.93 m)	205 pounds (93 kg)	Senior	Colonial Beach, Virginia	Graduated
Will Carlone	40	INF	6 ft 2 in (1.88 m)	205 pounds (93 kg)	Senior	West Seneca, New York	Graduated

=== Transfers ===
Incoming transfers
Name	Number	Pos.	Height	Weight	Year	Hometown	Previous School
Casey Kleinman	13	C	5 ft 8 in (1.73 m)	170 pounds (77 kg)	Junior	Westlake Village, California	Monterey Peninsula College
Everett Vaughan	14	RHP	6 ft 3 in (1.91 m)	210 pounds (95 kg)	Junior	Moseley, Virginia	High Point
Ethan Iannuzzi	15	OF	6 ft 1 in (1.85 m)	200 pounds (91 kg)	Graduate	Chesterfield, Virginia	Randolph–Macon
Owen Tappy	16	RHP	6 ft 1 in (1.85 m)	185 pounds (84 kg)	Graduate	Charlotte, North Carolina	Hampden–Sydney
Eli Weisner	21	OF	6 ft 3 in (1.91 m)	196 pounds (89 kg)	Graduate	Glen Allen, Virginia	Charlotte
James McGrady	24	INF	5 ft 11 in (1.80 m)	190 pounds (86 kg)	Junior	Norfolk, Virginia	Louisburg
Jake Wortman	27	C	6 ft 2 in (1.88 m)	210 pounds (95 kg)	Graduate	Fredericksburg, Virginia	Bucknell
Phil Forbes V	29	RHP	6 ft 0 in (1.83 m)	185 pounds (84 kg)	Sophomore	Newport News, Virginia	Louisburg
Nick Cosentino	32	RHP	6 ft 3 in (1.91 m)	220 pounds (100 kg)	Senior	Pittsburgh, Pennsylvania	Charlotte
Anderson Fulk	33	OF	6 ft 3 in (1.91 m)	207 pounds (94 kg)	Junior	York, South Carolina	Florence–Darlington Tech
Bobby Lane	34	OF	6 ft 3 in (1.91 m)	195 pounds (88 kg)	RS Sophomore	Trafford, Pennsylvania	Cincinnati
Will Gross	40	LHP	5 ft 11 in (1.80 m)	180 pounds (82 kg)	Junior	El Paso, Texas	El Paso CC
Will Greer	42	RHP	6 ft 3 in (1.91 m)	225 pounds (102 kg)	Graduate	Cohasset, Massachusetts	Bucknell
Jack Hoeymans	45	RHP	6 ft 3 in (1.91 m)	225 pounds (102 kg)	RS Junior	McLean, Virginia	John A. Logan College
MIchael Walsh	52	RHP	6 ft 1 in (1.85 m)	195 pounds (88 kg)	RS Sophomore	Leesburg, Virginia	Maryland

=== Signing Day Recruits ===
The following players signed National Letter of Intents to play for VCU in 2024.

Player	Hometown	High School
Pitchers
Nick Frers	Vancouver, British Columbia	Argyle
Joe Gomez	Rancho Cucamonga, California	Fluvanna
Aiden Milburn	Baldwinsville, New York	Charles W. Baker
Isaiah Wyatt	Richmond, Virginia	Highland Springs
Hitters
Trent Adelman	Darnestown, Maryland	PDG Academy
Will Epstein	Chapel Hill, North Carolina	PDG Academy
Chris McHugh	Commack, New York	Commack
Andrew Powers	Bethesda, Maryland	St. John's College

=== 2023 MLB draft ===
No VCU players were selected in the 2023 draft.

== Game log ==
2024 VCU Rams baseball game log (38–23)
Regular season (33–21)

February (5–4)
Date	TV	Opponent	Rank	Stadium	Score	Win	Loss	Save	Attendance	Overall	A-10	Source
February 16	ACCNX	at No. 13 NC State*		Doak Field; Raleigh, North Carolina	L 1–6	Highfill (1–0)	Ellis (0–1)	Van Dam (1)	3,016	0–1	—	Report
February 17	ACCNX	at No. 13 NC State*		Doak Field	W 9–6	Dressler (1–0)	Whitaker (0–1)	Tappy (1)	2,885	1–1	—	Report
February 18	ACCNX	at No. 13 NC State*		Doak Field	L 3–5	Marohn (1–0)	Peters (0–1)	Dudan (1)	2,660	1–2	—	Report
February 20	ESPN+	Longwood*		The Diamond; Richmond, Virginia	W 16–6^{8}	Martinez (1–0)	Dittner (0–1)	None	364	2–2	—	Report
February 23	ESPN+	Merrimack*		The Diamond	W 12–3	Peters (1–1)	Healey (0–1)	None	224	3–2	—	Report
February 24	ESPN+	Merrimack*		The Diamond	L 12–16	Dragon (1–1)	Tappy (0–1)	None	291	3–3	—	Report
February 25	ESPN+	Merrimack*		The Diamond	W 7–5	Martinez (2–0)	Cassidy (0–1)	None	275	4–3	—	Report
February 27	ACCNX	at No. 17 North Carolina*		Boshamer Stadium; Chapel Hill, North Carolina	L 2–8	Decaro (1–0)	Peters (1–2)	None	1,822	4–4	—	Report
February 28	ESPN+	Maryland*		The Diamond	W 15–7	Tappy (1–1)	French (0–1)	None	210	5–4	—	Report

March (13–6)
Date	TV	Opponent	Rank	Stadium	Score	Win	Loss	Save	Attendance	Overall	A-10	Source
Central Virginia Classic
March 1	ESPN+	Sacred Heart*		The Diamond	W 6–2	Martinez (3–0)	Babuschak (0–3)	None	247	6–4	—	Report
March 2	ESPN+	Central Connecticut*		The Diamond	W 10–0^{7}	Gordon (1–0)	Mozzicato (0–1)	Dressler (1)	340	7–4	—	Report
March 3	ESPN+	Boston College*		The Diamond	W 10–1	Curley (1–0)	McLendon (0–1)	Cosentino (1)	425	8–4	—	Report
First Pitch Invitational
March 7 (Note: Part of a doubleheader.)	YouTube	vs. Western Michigan*		Fluor Field; Greenville, South Carolina	W 9–7^{11}	Tappy (2–1)	Berg (1–2)	None	150	9–4	—	Report
March 7	YouTube	vs. Western Carolina*		Fluor Field	W 5–2	Curley (2–0)	Mortenson (0–1)	Cosentino (2)	150	10–4	—	Report
March 10	YouTube	vs. Michigan State*		Fluor Field	W 8–4	Gordon (2–0)	Matheny (0–2)	None	1,237	11–4	—	Report
March 12	ESPN+	at Longwood*		Buddy Bolding Stadium; Farmville, Virginia	L 0–4	Saale (1–0)	McGrady (0–1)	Warunek (1)	286	11–5	—	Report
March 15	ESPN+	Princeton*		The Diamond	W 11–7	Curley (3–0)	Sword (1–1)	None	300	12–5	—	Report
March 16	ESPN+	Princeton*		The Diamond	W 7–1	Gordon (3–0)	Kim (1–2)	Dressler (2)	300	13–5	—	Report
March 16	ESPN+	Princeton*		The Diamond	W 6–3	Tappy (3–1)	Gilman (0–1)	None	300	14–5	—	Report
March 17	ESPN+	Princeton*		The Diamond	L 11–15	Faulkner (1–1)	Hoeymans (0–1)	None	350	14–6	—	Report
March 19	ESPN+	at Liberty*		Liberty Baseball Stadium; Lynchburg, Virginia	W 8–7	Peters (2–2)	Dolby (0–3)	Tappy (2)	838	15–6	—	Report
March 22	FloBaseball	at Xavier*		J. Page Hayden Field; Cincinnati, Ohio	L 6–7	Hoskins (3–3)	Vaughan (0–1)	Vera (2)	104	15–7	—	Report
March 23	FloBaseball	at Xavier*		J. Page Hayden Field	L 5–9	Schmidt (3–2)	Dressler (1–1)	Kelly (3)	112	15–8	—	Report
March 24	FloBaseball	at Xavier*		J. Page Hayden Field	W 10–5	Curley (4–0)	Boyle (3–1)	None	250	16–8	—	Report
March 26	ESPN+	William & Mary*		The Diamond	L 3–6	Knowles (3–0)	Vaughan (0–2)	None	476	16–9	—	Report
March 28	ESPN+	UMass		The Diamond	W 7–6	Tappy (4–1)	Jensen (0–2)	None	175	17–9	1–0	Report
March 29	ESPN+	UMass		The Diamond	L 3–4	Lints (1–0)	Gordon (3–1)	Powers (1)	174	17–10	1–1	Report
March 30	ESPN+	UMass		The Diamond	W 7–1	Curley (5–0)	O'Connor (1–4)	None	358	18–10	2–1	Report

April (9–7)
Date	TV	Opponent	Rank	Stadium	Score	Win	Loss	Save	Attendance	Overall	A-10	Source
April 2	FloBaseball	at William & Mary*		Plumeri Park; Williamsburg, Virginia	W 9–5	Cosentino (1–0)	Lottchea (2–1)	None	619	19–10	—	Report
April 5	ESPN+	Davidson		The Diamond	W 10–8	Tappy (5–1)	Ban (1–1)	None	222	20–10	3–1	Report
April 6	ESPN+	Davidson		The Diamond	W 7–4	Dressler (2–1)	Fix (1–2)	None	201	21–10	4–1	Report
April 7	ESPN+	Davidson		The Diamond	W 6–1	Cosentino (2–0)	Feczko (2–5)	None	362	22–10	5–1	Report
April 9	ACCNX	at No. 11 Virginia*		Davenport Field; Charlottesville, Virginia	L 4–8	Hungate (3–0)	Ellis (0–2)	None	3,281	22–11	—	Report
April 12	ESPN+	at St. Bonaventure		Fred Handler Park; Olean, New York	L 5–7	Ciampa (1–2)	Peters (2–3)	None	172	22–12	5–2	Report
April 13	ESPN+	at St. Bonaventure		Fred Handler Park	W 5–0	Gordon (4–1)	Czajkowski (2–3)	None	305	23–12	6–2	Report
April 14	ESPN+	at St. Bonaventure		Fred Handler Park	L 6–11	Roggenburk (2–0)	Everett (0–3)	None	315	23–13	6–3	Report
April 16	ESPN+	Liberty*		The Diamond	W 2–1	Hoeymans (1–1)	Swink (0–1)	Tappy (3)	324	24–13	—	Report
April 19	ESPN+	Dayton		The Diamond	L 1–5	Majick (4–2)	Cosentino (2–1)	Wissman (6)	361	24–14	6–4	Report
April 20	ESPN+	Dayton		The Diamond	W 8–3	Gordon (5–1)	Peguero (1–4)	None	407	25–14	7–4	Report
April 21	ESPN+	Dayton		The Diamond	Canceled (inclement weather)					25–14	7–4	Report
Old Dominion–VCU series
April 23	ESPN+	at Old Dominion*		Bud Metheny Field; Norfolk, Virginia	L 1–7	Sulpizio (1–0)	Hoeymans (1–2)	None	583	25–15	—	Report
George Mason–VCU series
April 26	ESPN+	at George Mason		Spuhler Field; Fairfax, Virginia	W 6–4	Tappy (6–1)	Stewart (1–2)	None	135	26–15	8–4	Report
April 27	ESPN+	at George Mason		Spuhler Field	L 2–3	Gartland (2–3)	Gordon (5–2)	None	224	26–16	8–5	Report
April 28	ESPN+	at George Mason		Spuhler Field	W 9–8	Tappy (7–1)	Edmonds (1–2)	None	390	27–16	9–5	Report
Duel at the Diamond
April 30	ESPN+	No. 11 Virginia*		The Diamond	L 4–8	Moore (2–0)	Peters (2–4)	Teel (5)	3,689	27–17	—	Report

May (6–4)
Date	TV	Opponent	Rank	Stadium	Score	Win	Loss	Save	Attendance	Overall	A-10	Source
May 3	ESPN+	George Washington		The Diamond	W 6–2	Hoeymans (2–2)	Brennan (1–4)	Curley (1)	532	28–17	10–5	Report
May 4	ESPN+	George Washington		The Diamond	L 8–12	Siegenthaler (5–2)	Dressler (2–2)	Wilson (4)	625	28–18	10–6	Report
May 5	ESPN+	George Washington		The Diamond	L 6–11	Haug (3–1)	Tappy (7–2)	None	323	28–19	10–7	Report
Old Dominion–VCU series
May 7	ESPN+	Old Dominion*		The Diamond	L 8–14	Kellen (4–0)	Goleski (0–1)	None	683	28–20	—	Report
May 8 (Note: Rescheduled from March 7 due to inclement weather.)	ESPN+	at No. 10 East Carolina*		Clark-LeClair Stadium; Greenville, North Carolina	Canceled (scheduling conflict)					28–20	—	Report
May 10		at Fordham		Houlihan Park; The Bronx, New York	W 4–0	Hoeymans (3–2)	Lavelle (6–5)	Curley (2)	116	29–20	11–7	Report
May 11		at Fordham		Houlihan Park	W 4–3	Martinez (4–0)	Berg (5–6)	Tappy (4)	326	30–20	12–7	Report
May 12		at Fordham		Houlihan Park	W 8–3	Vaughan (1–3)	Perez (1–2)	None	187	31–20	13–7	
Capital City series
May 16	ESPN+	at Richmond		Malcolm U. Pitt Field; Richmond, Virginia	L 10–12	Hentschel (4–1)	Nuckols (0–1)	None	308	31–21	13–8	Report
May 17	ESPN+	at Richmond		Malcolm U. Pitt Field	W 11–4	Gordon (6–2)	Roche (3–8)	None	276	32–21	14–8	Report
May 18	ESPN+	at Richmond		Malcolm U. Pitt Field	W 12–4	Dressler (3–2)	Corso (1–2)	None	215	33–21	15–8	Report

Postseason (6–2)

Atlantic 10 Tournament (4–0)
Date	TV	Opponent	Rank	Stadium	Score	Win	Loss	Save	Attendance	Overall	A10T Record	Source
May 21	ESPN+	vs. (7) Saint Joseph's	(2)	Capital One Park; Tysons, Virginia	W 4–2	Curley (6–0)	Yablonski (4–5)	Tappy (5)	301	34–21	1–0	Report
May 22	ESPN+	vs. (3) Dayton	(2)	Capital One Park	W 11–3	Hoeymans (4–2)	Majick (5–5)	None	464	35–21	2–0	Report
May 23	ESPN+	vs. (4) Richmond	(2)	Capital One Park	W 13–7	Gordon (7–2)	Ymker (1–3)	None	1,035	36–21	3–0	Report
May 25	ESPN+	vs. (4) Richmond	(2)	Capital One Park	W 16–1	Cosentino (3–1)	Hentschel (4–2)	None	1,152	37–21	4–0	Report

NCAA Greenville Regional (1–2)
Date	TV	Opponent	Rank	Stadium	Score	Win	Loss	Save	Attendance	Overall	NCAAT Record	Source
May 31	ESPNU	vs. (2) No. 22 Wake Forest*	(3)	Clark-LeClair Stadium	W 1–0	Gordon (8–2)	Falco Jr. (2–5)	Curley (3)	5,571	38–21	1–0	Report
June 1	ESPN+	vs. (4) Evansville*	(3)	Clark-LeClair Stadium	L 11–17	Schultz (6–2)	Cosentino (3–2)	None	5,571	38–22	1–1	Report
June 2	ESPN+	vs. No. 16 (1) East Carolina*	(3)	Clark-LeClair Stadium	L 7–10	Beal (8–2)	Hoeymans (4–3)	None	5,571	38–23	1–2	Report

Legend: = Win = Loss = Canceled
Bold =VCU team member
Rankings are based on the team's current ranking in the D1Baseball poll.

Schedule Notes

== Tournaments ==
=== Atlantic 10 tournament ===
Atlantic 10 tournament teams
(1) Saint Louis Billikens	(2) VCU Rams	(3) Dayton Flyers	(4) Richmond Spiders	(5) George Washington Revolutionaries	(6) UMass Minutemen	(7) Saint Joseph's Hawks

Upper round 1	Upper round 2	Upper final	Final
May 22 – 11:00 a.m.
1	Saint Louis	10
May 21 – 11:00 a.m.
4	Richmond	13
4	Richmond	12
May 24 – 11:00 a.m.
5	George Washington	4
4	Richmond	7
May 21 – 3:00 p.m.
2	VCU	13
3	Dayton	4
May 22 – 3:00 p.m.
6	UMass	1
3	Dayton	3
May 21 – 7:00 p.m.
2	VCU	11
2	VCU	4
May 25 – 12:00 p.m. & 4:00 p.m.
7	Saint Joseph's	2
2	VCU	16	–
4	Richmond	1	–
Lower round 1	Lower round 2	Lower round 3	Lower final
May 23 – 11:00 a.m.
May 22 – 7:00 p.m.	1	Saint Louis	0	May 24 – 3:00 p.m.
6	UMass	2	7	St. Joseph's	14	May 23 – 7:00 p.m.	4	Richmond	14
7	St. Joseph's	12	7	St. Joseph's	13	7	St. Joseph's	6
May 23 – 3:00 p.m.	5	George Washington	12
5	George Washington	9
3	Dayton	1

First round (Game 3)
(7) Saint Joseph's Hawks	vs.	(2) VCU Rams

May 21, 2024 7:00 pm (EDT) at Capital One Park in Tysons, Virginia
Team	1	2	3	4	5	6	7	8	9	R	H	E
(7) Saint Joseph's	0	0	1	1	0	0	0	0	0	2	6	0
(2) VCU	2	0	0	0	0	0	1	1	X	4	8	0
WP: Brian Curley (6–0) LP: Colin Yablonski (4–5) Sv: Owen Tappy (5); Home runs: STJ: Ryan Weingartner; VCU: Brandon Eike, Eli Weisner; Attendance: 301

Upper final (Game 9)
(2) VCU Rams	vs.	(4) Richmond Spiders

May 23, 2024 3:05 pm (EDT) at Capital One Park in Tysons, Virginia
Team	1	2	3	4	5	6	7	8	9	R	H	E
(2) VCU	3	3	0	2	0	1	0	3	1	13	15	1
(4) Richmond	0	0	0	0	0	0	1	0	6	7	11	1
WP: Christian Gordon (7–2) LP: Logan Ymker (1–3) Sv: None; Home runs: VCU: Brandon Eike (2), Chris McHugh, Eli Weisner, Ethan Iannuzzi; UR: None; Attendance: 1,035

Upper round 2 (Game 5)
(3) Dayton Flyers	vs.	(2) VCU Rams

May 22, 2024 3:05 pm (EDT) at Capital One Park in Tysons, Virginia
Team	1	2	3	4	5	6	7	8	9	R	H	E
(3) Dayton	0	1	0	1	1	0	0	0	0	3	10	1
(2) VCU	0	1	3	4	1	1	0	1	X	11	14	0
WP: Jack Hoeymans (4–2) LP: Eli Majick (5–5) Sv: None; Home runs: DAY: None; VCU: Brandon Eike, Eli Weisner, William Bean; Attendance: 464

Championship, Game 1 (Game 12)
(2) VCU Rams	vs.	(4) Richmond Spiders

May 25, 2024 12:05 pm (EDT) at Capital One Park in Tysons, Virginia
Team	1	2	3	4	5	6	7	8	9	R	H	E
(2) VCU	0	0	0	0	8	0	0	1	7	16	16	0
(4) Richmond	0	0	0	0	0	0	0	1	0	1	9	0
WP: Nick Cosentino (3–1) LP: Cole Hentschel (4–2); Home runs: VCU: Cooper Benzin, Brandon Eike, William Bean; UR: None; Attendance: 1,152

=== NCAA tournament ===
NCAA Greenville Regional teams
(1) East Carolina Pirates	(2) Wake Forest Demon Deacons	(3) VCU Rams	(4) Evansville Purple Aces

First round
1	East Carolina	1
4	Evansville	4
Winner's bracket
3	VCU	1
2	Wake Forest	0
1	East Carolina	7
2	Wake Forest	6
Loser's bracket

Semifinals
4	Evansville	17
3	VCU	11
3	VCU	7
1	East Carolina	10

Finals
4	Evansville	6	6
1	East Carolina	19	5

Game 2
(3) VCU Rams	vs.	(2) Wake Forest Demon Deacons

May 31, 2024 6:05 pm (EDT) at Clark–LeClair Stadium in Greenville, North Carolina
Team	1	2	3	4	5	6	7	8	9	R	H	E
(3) VCU	0	0	0	0	1	0	0	0	0	1	3	1
(2) Wake Forest	0	0	0	0	0	0	0	0	0	0	3	1
WP: Christian Gordon (8–2) LP: David Falco Jr. (2–5) Sv: Brian Curley (3); Home runs: VCU: None; WF: None; Attendance: 5,571

Game 5
(1) East Carolina Pirates	vs.	(3) VCU Rams

June 2, 2024 12:05 pm (EDT) at Clark–LeClair Stadium in Greenville, North Carolina
Team	1	2	3	4	5	6	7	8	9	R	H	E
(1) East Carolina	1	1	2	2	2	0	2	0	0	10	13	0
(3) VCU	0	0	0	2	2	0	0	2	1	7	10	0
WP: Danny Beal (8–2) LP: Jack Hoeymans (4–3); Home runs: ECU: Carter Cunningham, Jacob Jenkins-Cowart; VCU: None; Attendance: 5,571

Game 4
(4) Evansville Purple Aces	vs.	(3) VCU Rams

June 1, 2024 6:05 pm (EDT) at Clark–LeClair Stadium in Greenville, North Carolina
Team	1	2	3	4	5	6	7	8	9	R	H	E
(4) Evansville	0	3	0	3	7	2	0	2	0	17	16	0
(3) VCU	0	0	0	0	3	2	5	0	1	11	14	1
WP: Donovan Schultz (6–2) LP: Nick Cosentino (3–2); Home runs: EVAN: Chase Hug, Brent Widder, Cal McGinnis, Kip Fougerousse; VCU: Casey Kleinman, Chris McHugh; Attendance: 5,571

== Rankings ==
Ranking movements Legend: ██ Increase in ranking ██ Decrease in ranking — = Not ranked RV = Received votes
	Week																			
Poll	Pre	1	2	3	4	5	6	7	8	9	10	11	12	13	14	15	16	17	18	Final
Coaches'	—	—*	—	—	—	—	—	—	—	—	—	—	—	—	—	—	—	—	RV	RV
Baseball America	—	—	—	—	—	—	—	—	—	—	—	—	—	—	—	—	—	—	—	—
Collegiate Baseball^		—	—	—	—	—	—	—	—	—	—	—	—	—	—	—	—	—	—	—
NCBWA†	—	—	—	—	—	—	—	RV	—	—	—	—	—	—	—	—	RV	RV	RV	RV
D1Baseball	—	—	—	—	—	—	—	—	—	—	—	—	—	—	—	—	—	—	—	—

^ Collegiate Baseball ranked 40 teams in their preseason poll, but only ranked 30 teams weekly during the season.
† NCBWA ranks 30 teams in their preseason poll, but only ranks 25 teams weekly during the season.
* A new poll was not released for this week, so for comparison purposes, the previous week's ranking is inserted in this week's slot.

== Awards and honors ==
=== Team honors ===
Atlantic 10 Conference Weekly Awards
Player	Award	Date Awarded	Ref.
Owen Tappy	Pitcher of the Week	February 20, 2024	
Brandon Eike	Player of the Week	March 12, 2024	
Brian Curley	Pitcher of the Week	March 12, 2024	
Christian Gordon	Pitcher of the Week	April 15, 2024	

All-A10 tournament team
Player	Position
Nick Cosentino	2B
William Bean	SS
Brandon Eike	3B
Eli Weisner	OF
Christian Gordon	SP

All-A10
Player	Position	Team
Brandon Eike	3B	1st
Brian Curley	RHP	1st
Christian Gordon	LHP	2nd
Chris McHugh	1B	Rookie
Cade Dressler	LHP	Academic

=== Individual honors ===
Atlantic-10 individual honors
Player	Position	Award	Ref.
Brandon Eike	3B	Atlantic 10 tournament MVP	
Brandon Eike	3B	Atlantic 10 Player of the Year	
