= 2024 Saint Louis Billikens baseball team =

American college baseball season

2024 Saint Louis Billikens baseball
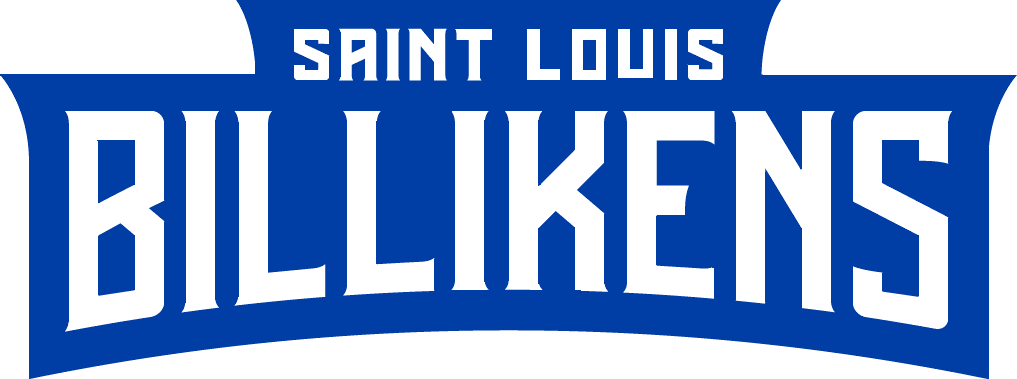

Atlantic 10 regular season champion
- Conference: Atlantic 10 Conference
- Record: 37–16 (16–8 A-10)
- Head coach: Darin Hendrickson (17th season)
- Assistant coaches: Logan Moon (4th season); Miles Miller (1st season); Jason Eary (2nd season)
- Home stadium: Billiken Sports Center

2024 Atlantic 10 Conference baseball standings
	Conf.				Overall
Team	W		L	PCT	W		L	PCT
Saint Louis ‍†‍‍	16	–	8	.667	37	–	16	.698
VCU ‍‍‡‍^{y}	15	–	8	.652	37	–	21	.638
Dayton ‍‍‍	14	–	9	.609	33	–	22	.600
George Washington ‍‍‍	13	–	11	.542	31	–	26	.544
Saint Joseph's ‍‍‍	13	–	11	.542	29	–	26	.527
Richmond ‍‍‍	13	–	11	.542	27	–	32	.458
UMass ‍‍‍	13	–	11	.542	24	–	29	.453
Rhode Island ‍‍‍	11	–	13	.458	19	–	28	.404
Davidson ‍‍‍	10	–	14	.417	24	–	28	.462
Fordham ‍‍‍	10	–	14	.417	19	–	33	.365
St. Bonaventure ‍‍‍	8	–	16	.333	18	–	31	.367
George Mason ‍‍‍	7	–	17	.292	21	–	32	.396
† – Conference champion ‡ – Tournament champion y – Invited to the NCAA tournament As of May 25, 2024; Rankings from D1Baseball

The 2024 Saint Louis Billikens baseball team represented Saint Louis University during the 2024 NCAA Division I baseball season. The Billikens played home games at Billiken Sports Center as a member of the Atlantic 10 Conference. They were led by head coach Darin Hendrickson, in his 17th season with the program.

== Previous season ==
The 2023 Saint Louis team finished the season with a 33–23 (15–9) record. They reached the finals of the 2023 Atlantic 10 Conference baseball tournament where they lost to George Mason.

== Preseason ==
=== Preseason Atlantic 10 awards and honors ===
Ethan Bell, Hayden Moore, and Cole Smith were named to the All-Atlantic 10 Preseason team.

Preseason All-Atlantic 10 Team
Player	No.	Position	Class
Ethan Bell	26	RHP	Senior
Hayden Moore	1	INF	Junior
Cole Smith	11	DH	Senior

=== Coaches poll ===
The coaches poll was released on February 14, 2024. Saint Louis was picked to win the conference and received three first-place votes.

Coaches' Poll
Predicted finish	Team	Points
1	Saint Louis	125 (3)
2	George Mason	121 (2)
3	Saint Joseph's	114 (1)
4	Davidson	113 (2)
5	VCU	97 (2)
6	Dayton	96 (1)
7	Rhode Island	77 (1)
8	Richmond	63
9	George Washington	51
10	Fordham	38
11	UMass	22
12	St. Bonaventure	19

== Personnel ==
=== Starters ===
Lineup
Pos.	No.	Player.	Year
C	6	Knox Preston	Senior
1B	11	Cole Smith	Senior
2B	2	Ethan Sitzman	Junior
3B	25	Graham Mastros	Freshman
SS	7	Austin Neuweg	Sophomore
LF	15	Tyler Fogarty	Senior
CF	1	Hayden Moore	Junior
RF	9	Patrick Clohisy	Junior
DH	8	Drew Winters	Senior

Weekend pitching rotation
Day	No.	Player.	Year
Friday	88	Jackson Holmes	Junior
Saturday	13	Tommy Ray	Senior
Sunday	19	Charlie Weber	Sophomore

== Game log ==
2024 Saint Louis Billikens baseball game log (37–16)
Regular season (37–14)

February (8–0)
Date	Opponent	Rank	Site/stadium	Score	Win	Loss	Save	TV	Attendance	Overall record	A10 Record
February 16	vs. St. Thomas (MN)*		Charlotte Sports Park; Port Charlotte, Florida	**W** 21–10	**Holmes** (1–0)	Esch (0–1)	None	ESPN+	77	1–0	—
February 17	vs. Illinois State*		Charlotte Sports Park	**W** 13–8	**J. Weber** (1–0)	Chadwick (0–1)	**Gray** (1)	ESPN+	95	2–0	—
February 18	vs. St. Thomas (MN)		Charlotte Sports Park	**W** 15–7	**Smith** (1–0)	Cano (0–1)	None	ESPN+	100	3–0	—
February 21	at Lindenwood*		Lou Brock Stadium; St. Charles, Missouri	**W** 10–2	**Yarberry** (1–0)	Jungers (0–1)	None	ESPN+	164	4–0	—
February 23	vs. Western Illinois*		USA Baseball Complex; Millington, Tennessee	**W** 20–6	**Holmes** (2–0)	Buhl (0–1)	None	USABtv	119	5–0	—
February 24	vs. Western Illinois*		USA Baseball Complex	**W** 17–4	**J. Weber** (2–0)	Rosenfeld (0–1)	None	USABtv	293	6–0	—
February 25	vs. Western Illinois*		USA Baseball Complex	**W** 8–5	**Yarberry** (2–0)	Humphrey (0–2)	**Bell** (1)	USABtv	202	7–0	—
February 27	at SIUE*		Roy E. Lee Field; Edwardsville, Illinois	**W** 13–8	**Smith** (1–0)	Rodriguez (0–2)	None		398	8–0	—

March (11–6)
Date	Opponent	Rank	Site/stadium	Score	Win	Loss	Save	TV	Attendance	Overall record	A10 Record
March 1	Le Moyne*		Billiken Sports Center; St. Louis, Missouri	**L** 5–6	Hoffacker (2–2)	**Gray** (0–1)	None		77	8–1	—
March 2	Le Moyne*		Billiken Sports Center	**W** 4–0	**Holmes** (3–0)	Crystal (0–2)	None		151	9–1	—
March 3	Le Moyne*		Billiken Sports Center	**W** 19–5	**C. Weber** (1–0)	Goldman (0–2)	None		82	10–1	—
March 5	Western Illinois*		Billiken Sports Center	**W** 14–4	**Yarberry** (3–0)	Rodgers (0–1)	None		52	11–1	—
March 8	Loyola Marymount*		Billiken Sports Center	**W** 9–5	**Ray** (1–0)	Hackman (3–1)	**C. Weber** (1)	ESPN+	85	12–1	—
March 9	Loyola Marymount*		Billiken Sports Center	**W** 8–6	**Holmes** (4–0)	Towers (1–1)	**Bell** (2)	ESPN+	105	13–1	—
March 10	Loyola Marymount*		Billiken Sports Center	**W** 11–9	**Cunningham** (1–0)	McRoberts (0–2)	**Richter** (1)	ESPN+	105	14–1	—
March 12	Missouri State*		Billiken Sports Center	**W** 5–3	**Chaffin** (1–0)	Day (1–2)	**Bell** (3)	ESPN+	101	15–1	—
March 15	at Southeastern Louisiana*		Pat Kenelly Diamond; Hammond, Louisiana	**L** 8–10	Bennett (1–0)	**Holmes** (4–1)	Rodriguez (4)		1,332	15–2	—
March 16	at Southeastern Louisiana*		Pat Kenelly Diamond	**L** 8–9	Aspholm (1–0)	**Bell** (0–1)	Polk (2)		1,238	15–3	—
March 17	at Southeastern Louisiana*		Pat Kenelly Diamond	**Canceled (inclement weather)**						15–3	—
March 18	at Tulane*		Turchin Stadium; New Orleans, Louisiana	**L** 0–2	Lombardi (1–1)	**Yarberry** (3–1)	Moore (3)	ESPN+	1,484	15–4	—
March 22	Cincinnati*		Billiken Sports Center	**W** 14–12	**Holmes** (5–1)	Logue (0–3)	**C. Weber** (2)	ESPN+	103	16–4	—
March 23	Cincinnati*		Billiken Sports Center	**L** 4–13	Boba (2–2)	**Yarberry** (3–2)	None	ESPN+	73	16–5	—
March 24	Cincinnati*		Billiken Sports Center	**L** 3–8	Insco (3–0)	**Chaffin** (1–1)	Garula (1)	ESPN+	127	16–6	—
March 26	at Kansas*		Hoglund Ballpark; Lawrence, Kansas	**Canceled (inclement weather)**						16–6	—
March 28	Rhode Island		Billiken Sports Center	**W** 3–2	**Bell** (1–1)	Fernandez (0–1)	None	ESPN+	67	17–6	1–0
March 29	Rhode Island		Billiken Sports Center	**W** 8–1	**Yarberry** (4–2)	Sposato (0–2)	None		57	18–6	2–0
March 30	Rhode Island		Billiken Sports Center	**W** 7–3	**Evan** (1–1)	Johnston (1–2)	None	ESPN+	53	19–6	3–0

April (10–5)
Date	Opponent	Rank	Site/stadium	Score	Win	Loss	Save	TV	Attendance	Overall record	A10 Record
April 2	SIUE*		Billiken Sports Center	**W** 5–4^{10}	**Cunningham** (2–0)	Ponder (2–2)	None		93	20–6	—
April 5	at Saint Joseph's		John Smithson Field; Merion, Pennsylvania	**W** 10–2	**Holmes** (6–1)	McCausland (1–3)	**Bell** (4)	ESPN+	221	21–6	4–0
April 6	at Saint Joseph's		John Smithson Field	**L** 1–9	DeSanto (2–1)	**Yarberry** (4–3)	McShane (1)	ESPN+	306	21–7	4–1
April 7	at Saint Joseph's		John Smithson Field	**L** 3–7	Picone (4–1)	**Chaffin** (1–2)	Rodriguez (2)	ESPN+	367	21–8	4–2
April 9	Southern Indiana*		Billiken Sports Center	**W** 13–5	**Yarberry** (5–3)	Weihe (0–2)	None		112	22–8	—
April 12	Davidson		Billiken Sports Center	**W** 15–6	**Bell** (2–1)	Perkins (3–3)	None	ESPN+	153	23–8	5–2
April 13	Davidson		Billiken Sports Center	**W** 6–1	**J. Weber** (2–0)	Cavanaugh (1–4)	None	ESPN+	217	24–8	6–2
April 14	Davidson		Billiken Sports Center	**W** 7–2	**Yarberry** (6–3)	Feczko (6–7)	None	ESPN+	122	25–8	7–2
April 19	at Fordham		Houlihan Park; New York City, New York	**W** 6–1	**Holmes** (7–1)	Lavelle (5–4)	**Bell** (5)		171	26–8	8–2
April 20	at Fordham		Houlihan Park	**L** 4–8	Stewart (1–0)	**C. Weber** (2–1)	None		203	26–9	8–3
April 21	at Fordham		Houlihan Park	**L** 4–5	Berg (5–4)	**Gray** (1–2)	None		144	26–10	8–4
April 23	at Lindenwood*		Lou Brock Stadium	**W** 3–1	**Litman** (1–0)	Rakers (2–1)	**Kelly** (1)		253	27–10	—
April 26	at George Washington		Barcroft Park; Arlington, Virginia	**W** 8–5	**Holmes** (8–1)	Brennan (1–3)	None	ESPN+	107	28–10	9–4
April 27	at George Washington		Barcroft Park	**L** 3–5	Siegenthaler (4–2)	**C. Weber** (2–2)	Cutler (2)	ESPN+	98	28–11	9–5
April 28	at George Washington		Barcroft Park	**W** 4–2	**Owen** (1–0)	Korson (3–2)	**Gray** (2)	ESPN+	113	29–11	10–5
April 30	at Butler*		Bulldog Park; Indianapolis, Indiana	**W** 12–2	**Chaffin** (2–2)	Miketinac (2–1)	None	BEDN	129	30–11	—

May (7–3)
Date	Opponent	Rank	Site/stadium	Score	Win	Loss	Save	TV	Attendance	Overall record	A10 Record
May 3	George Mason		Billiken Sports Center	**W** 4–3	**J. Weber** (3–0)	Stewart (1–3)	**Bell** (6)		163	31–11	11–5
May 4	George Mason		Billiken Sports Center	**W** 5–2	**Gray** (2–2)	Gartland (2–4)	None		136	32–11	12–5
May 5	George Mason		Billiken Sports Center	**W** 5–4	**Bell** (3–1)	Yount (2–1)	None		151	33–11	13–5
May 7	Lindenwood*		Billiken Sports Center	**W** 9–4	**Litman** (2–0)	Rakers (2–3)	None		107	34–11	—
May 10	Dayton		Billiken Sports Center	**L** 3–11	Majick (5–3)	**Holmes** (8–2)	None		153	34–12	13–6
May 11	Dayton		Billiken Sports Center	**W** 11–4	**Bell** (4–1)	Fennell (4–4)	None		182	35–12	14–6
May 12	Dayton		Billiken Sports Center	**W** 8–5	**J. Weber** (4–0)	Peguero (2–5)	**Gray** (3)		147	36–12	15–6
May 16	at UMass		Earl Lorden Field; Amherst, Massachusetts	**W** 8–3	**Holmes** (9–2)	Lints (3–2)	None	ESPN+	285	37–12	16–6
May 17	at UMass		Earl Lorden Field	**L** 0–6	Masteralexis (5–1)	**C. Weber** (2–3)	None	ESPN+	285	37–13	16–7
May 18	at UMass		Earl Lorden Field	**L** 2–5	O'Connor (3–5)	**Litman (3–1)**	Middleton (3)	ESPN+	325	37–14	16–8

Postseason (0–2)

Atlantic 10 Tournament (0–2)
Date	Opponent	Rank	Site/stadium	Score	Win	Loss	Save	TV	Attendance	Overall record	A10T Record
May 22	vs. (4) Richmond	(1)	Capital One Park; Tysons, Virginia	**L** 10–13	Rodriguez (5–2)	**Holmes** (9–3)	None	ESPN+	301	37–15	0–1
May 23	vs. (7) Saint Joseph's	(1)	Capital One Park	**L** 0–14	DeSanto (4–2)	**Weber** (3–3)	None	ESPN+	464	37–16	0–2

Legend: = Win = Loss = Canceled
Bold = Saint Louis team member
"*" indicates a non-conference game.
"#" represents ranking. All rankings are based on the team's current ranking in the D1Baseball poll.
"()" represents postseason seeding in the Atlantic 10 Tournament or NCAA Regional.

== Tournaments ==
=== Atlantic 10 tournament ===
Atlantic 10 tournament teams
(1) Saint Louis Billikens	(2) VCU Rams	(3) Dayton Flyers	(4) Richmond Spiders	(5) George Washington Revolutionaries	(6) UMass Minutemen	(7) Saint Joseph's Hawks

Upper round 1	Upper round 2	Upper final	Final
May 22 – 11:00 a.m.
1	Saint Louis	10
May 21 – 11:00 a.m.
4	Richmond	13
4	Richmond	12
May 24 – 11:00 a.m.
5	George Washington	4
4	Richmond	7
May 21 – 3:00 p.m.
2	VCU	13
3	Dayton	4
May 22 – 3:00 p.m.
6	UMass	1
3	Dayton	3
May 21 – 7:00 p.m.
2	VCU	11
2	VCU	4
May 25 – 12:00 p.m. & 4:00 p.m.
7	Saint Joseph's	2
2	VCU	16	–
4	Richmond	1	–
Lower round 1	Lower round 2	Lower round 3	Lower final
May 23 – 11:00 a.m.
May 22 – 7:00 p.m.	1	Saint Louis	0	May 24 – 3:00 p.m.
6	UMass	2	7	St. Joseph's	14	May 23 – 7:00 p.m.	4	Richmond	14
7	St. Joseph's	12	7	St. Joseph's	13	7	St. Joseph's	6
May 23 – 3:00 p.m.	5	George Washington	12
5	George Washington	9
3	Dayton	1

Second round (Game 4)
(4) Richmond Spiders	vs.	(1) Saint Louis Billikens

May 22, 2024 10:00 am (CDT) at Capital One Park in Tysons, Virginia
Team	1	2	3	4	5	6	7	8	9	R	H	E
(4) Richmond	3	0	3	0	2	1	4	0	0	13	11	1
(1) Saint Louis	0	0	0	2	0	3	3	2	0	10	13	2
WP: Esteban Rodriguez (5–2) LP: Jackson Holmes (9–3); Home runs: UR: Jack Arcamone (2), Jordan Jaffe, Connor Larson; SLU: Tyler Fogarty (2), Easton Richter (2); Attendance: 301

Lower round 2 (Game 6)
(1) Saint Louis Billikens	vs.	(7) Saint Joseph's Hawks

May 23, 2024 10:00 pm (CDT) at Capital One Park in Tysons, Virginia
Team	1	2	3	4	5	6	7	8	9	R	H	E
(1) Saint Louis	0	0	0	0	0	0	0	0	0	0	4	1
(7) Saint Joseph's	1	0	4	5	3	0	1	0	X	14	16	0
WP: Ryan DeSanto (4–2) LP: Charlie Weber (3–3); Home runs: SLU: None; STJ: Ryan Cesarini (2), Tim Dickinson, Owen Petrich; Attendance: 464

== Rankings ==
Ranking movements Legend: ██ Increase in ranking ██ Decrease in ranking — = Not ranked RV = Received votes
	Week																			
Poll	Pre	1	2	3	4	5	6	7	8	9	10	11	12	13	14	15	16	17	18	Final
Coaches'	—	—*	RV	RV	RV	—	—	—	—	—	—	—	—	RV	RV	RV	—	—	—	—
Baseball America	—	—	—	—	—	—	—	—	—	—	—	—	—	—	—	—	—	—	—	—
Collegiate Baseball^	—	—	—	—	—	—	—	—	—	—	—	—	—	—	—	—	—	—	—	—
NCBWA†	RV	RV	RV	RV	RV	—	—	—	—	—	—	—	—	RV	RV	RV	RV	—	—	—
D1Baseball	—	—	—	—	—	—	—	—	—	—	—	—	—	—	—	—	—	—	—	—

^ Collegiate Baseball ranked 40 teams in their preseason poll, but only ranked 30 teams weekly during the season.
† NCBWA ranks 30 teams in their preseason poll, but only ranks 25 teams weekly during the season.
* A new poll was not released for this week, so for comparison purposes, the previous week's ranking is inserted in this week's slot.
