= 2023 VCU Rams baseball team =

American college baseball season

2023 VCU Rams baseball
- Conference: Atlantic 10 Conference
- Record: 25–30 (11–13 A-10)
- Head coach: Bradley LeCroy (1st season)
- Assistant coaches: Andrew Cox (1st season); Tanner Gordon (1st season); Andrew Llewellyn (3rd season)
- Home stadium: The Diamond

2023 Atlantic 10 Conference baseball standings
| | Conf. | | | | | | Overall |
| Team | W | | L | | T | PCT | W | | L | | T | PCT |
|---|---|---|---|---|---|---|---|---|---|---|---|---|
| Saint Joseph's ‍†‍‍ | 17 | – | 7 | – | 0 | .708 | 28 | – | 24 | – | 1 | .538 |
| Davidson ‍‍‍ | 15 | – | 8 | – | 0 | .652 | 30 | – | 24 | – | 0 | .556 |
| Saint Louis ‍‍‍ | 15 | – | 9 | – | 0 | .625 | 33 | – | 23 | – | 0 | .589 |
| Dayton ‍‍‍ | 15 | – | 9 | – | 0 | .625 | 26 | – | 34 | – | 0 | .433 |
| Richmond ‍‍‍ | 14 | – | 9 | – | 0 | .609 | 27 | – | 28 | – | 0 | .491 |
| George Mason ‍‍‡‍^{y} | 13 | – | 10 | – | 0 | .565 | 36 | – | 27 | – | 0 | .571 |
| Rhode Island ‍‍‍ | 13 | – | 11 | – | 0 | .542 | 23 | – | 29 | – | 0 | .442 |
| George Washington ‍‍‍ | 11 | – | 12 | – | 0 | .478 | 21 | – | 34 | – | 0 | .382 |
| VCU ‍‍‍ | 11 | – | 13 | – | 0 | .458 | 25 | – | 30 | – | 0 | .455 |
| Fordham ‍‍‍ | 7 | – | 17 | – | 0 | .292 | 19 | – | 36 | – | 0 | .345 |
| UMass ‍‍‍ | 6 | – | 18 | – | 0 | .250 | 14 | – | 35 | – | 0 | .286 |
| St. Bonaventure ‍‍‍ | 5 | – | 19 | – | 0 | .208 | 8 | – | 40 | – | 0 | .167 |
† – Conference champion ‡ – Tournament champion y – Invited to the NCAA tournament As of June 25, 2023; Rankings from D1Baseball

The 2023 VCU Rams baseball team represented Virginia Commonwealth University during the 2023 NCAA Division I baseball season. The Rams played their home games at The Diamond as a member of the Atlantic 10 Conference. They were led by head coach Bradley LeCroy, in his first season with the program.

The Rams finished the season with a 25–30 record.

== Previous season ==
The 2022 VCU Rams baseball team notched a 42–20 (19–5) regular season record. VCU successfully defended their tournament championship, winning the 2022 Atlantic 10 Conference baseball tournament over Richmond, and qualified for the NCAA tournament for the second year in a row. They were seeded number three in the Chapel Hill Regional. There, they defeated Georgia and then North Carolina in the opening round, before losing two straight to North Carolina. Upon the end of the season, VCU head coach, Shawn Stiffler resigned to become the head coach for Notre Dame.

== Preseason ==
=== Preseason Atlantic 10 awards and honors ===
Austin Younce was named the Atlantic 10 Preseason Freshman of the Year, while Will Carlone, and Campbell Ellis were named to the All-Atlantic 10 Preseason team.

A-10 Preseason Freshman of the Year
| Player | No. | Position | Class |
| Austin Younce | 18 | C | Freshman |

Preseason All-Atlantic 10 Team
| Player | No. | Position | Class |
| Will Carlone | 40 | INF | RS Junior |
| Campbell Ellis | 46 | LHP | Junior |

=== Coaches poll ===
The Atlantic 10 baseball coaches' poll was released on February 7, 2023. VCU was picked to finish second the Atlantic 10.

Coaches' Poll
| Predicted finish | Team | Points |
|---|---|---|
| 1 | Davidson | 130 (5) |
| 2 | VCU | 125 (4) |
| 3 | Richmond | 103 (1) |
| 4 | Saint Louis | 103 |
| 5 | Dayton | 92 (1) |
| 6 | Rhode Island | 85 |
| 7 | Saint Joseph's | 81 |
| 8 | George Mason | 70 (1) |
| 9 | Fordham | 52 |
| 10 | George Washington | 51 |
| 11 | UMass | 27 |
| 12 | St. Bonaventure | 17 |

== Personnel ==
=== Starters ===
Lineup
| Pos. | No. | Player. | Year |
|---|---|---|---|
| C | 37 | Nic Ericsson | RS Junior |
| 1B | 3 | Brandon Eike | Sophomore |
| 2B | 4 | Ethan Brooks | Freshman |
| 3B | 8 | Harrison Long | Sophomore |
| SS | 10 | William Bean | Junior |
| LF | 26 | Cooper Benzin | RS Junior |
| CF | 13 | A.J. Mathis | RS Senior |
| RF | 21 | Logan Amiss | RS Senior |
| DH | 40 | Will Carlone | RS Junior |

Weekend Pitching Rotation
| Day | No. | Player. | Year |
|---|---|---|---|
| Friday | 46 | Campbell Ellis | Junior |
| Saturday | 1 | Christian Gordon | Junior |
| Sunday | 33 | Mason Delane | RS Junior |

=== Roster ===
2023 VCU Rams baseball team
Players
Coaches

| # | Pos. | Name | B/T | Height | Weight | Year | Home town |
|---|---|---|---|---|---|---|---|
| 1 | LHP | Christian Gordon | L/L | 6 ft 0 in (1.83 m) | 180 lb (82 kg) | Jr | Amherst, VA |
| 2 | INF | Brandon Eike | R/R | 6 ft 0 in (1.83 m) | 220 lb (100 kg) | So | Powhatan, VA |
| 4 | INF | Ethan Brooks | R/R | 5 ft 11 in (1.8 m) | 160 lb (73 kg) | Fr | Glen Allen, VA |
| 6 | INF | Griffin Boone | R/R | 6 ft 0 in (1.83 m) | 180 lb (82 kg) | RS So | Montclair, VA |
| 8 | INF | Harrison Long | R/R | 5 ft 10 in (1.78 m) | 175 lb (79 kg) | So | Sarasota, FL |
| 9 | OF | Scottie O'Bryan | R/R | 6 ft 0 in (1.83 m) | 195 lb (88 kg) | RS Jr | Jamesville, NY |
| 10 | INF | William Bean | R/R | 5 ft 11 in (1.8 m) | 180 lb (82 kg) | Jr | Great Falls, VA |
| 12 | OF | Jesse Robinson Jr. | R/R | 6 ft 2 in (1.88 m) | 190 lb (86 kg) | So | Short Pump, VA |
| 13 | OF | AJ Maths | L/L | 5 ft 8 in (1.73 m) | 165 lb (75 kg) | RS Sr | Tampa, FL |
| 15 | C | Jacob Selden | L/R | 6 ft 0 in (1.83 m) | 175 lb (79 kg) | Gr | Charleston, SC |
| 16 | OF | Gavyn Boyle | L/R | 6 ft 2 in (1.88 m) | 200 lb (91 kg) | Fr | Gasport, NY |
| 17 | C | Casey Gibbs | S/R | 6 ft 0 in (1.83 m) | 170 lb (77 kg) | So | Olney, MD |
| 18 | C | Austin Younce | R/R | 6 ft 0 in (1.83 m) | 190 lb (86 kg) | Fr | Chesapeake, VA |
| 19 | OF | John Lucas | R/R | 6 ft 1 in (1.85 m) | 180 lb (82 kg) | RS Fr | Midlothian, VA |
| 20 | INF | Macho Santiago | L/R | 6 ft 0 in (1.83 m) | 200 lb (91 kg) | Fr | Richmond, VA |
| 21 | OF | Logan Amiss | L/R | 5 ft 11 in (1.8 m) | 205 lb (93 kg) | RS Sr | Powhatan, VA |
| 22 | OF | Aden Hill | L/R | 5 ft 10 in (1.78 m) | 200 lb (91 kg) | Fr | Mechanicsville, MD |
| 24 | RHP | James Gladden | R/R | 6 ft 0 in (1.83 m) | 185 lb (84 kg) | Fr | Baltimore, MD |
| 25 | INF | Jake Thilges | R/R | 6 ft 2 in (1.88 m) | 212 lb (96 kg) | RS So | Johnston, IA |
| 26 | OF | Cooper Benzin | R/R | 6 ft 3 in (1.91 m) | 195 lb (88 kg) | RS Jr | Ashland, VA |
| 27 | RHP | Nick Frazier | R/R | 5 ft 9 in (1.75 m) | 170 lb (77 kg) | So | Vienna, VA |
| 28 | LHP | Devan Zirwas | L/L | 6 ft 3 in (1.91 m) | 210 lb (95 kg) | Fr | Imperial, PA |
| 30 | RHP | Justin Walton | R/R | 6 ft 0 in (1.83 m) | 180 lb (82 kg) | Gr | Glen Allen, VA |
| 31 | RHP | Evan Bert | R/R | 6 ft 0 in (1.83 m) | 195 lb (88 kg) | Fr | Harrisonburg, VA |
| 32 | OF | Devan Barnett | L/L | 6 ft 5 in (1.96 m) | 212 lb (96 kg) | Jr | Pittsburgh, PA |
| 33 | RHP | Mason Delane | R/R | 6 ft 4 in (1.93 m) | 205 lb (93 kg) | RS Jr | Colonial Beach, VA |
| 34 | INF | Ethan Serrano | R/R | 5 ft 10 in (1.78 m) | 170 lb (77 kg) | Fr | Mechanicsville, VA |
| 36 | RHP | Brendan Erka | R/R | 6 ft 2 in (1.88 m) | 195 lb (88 kg) | So | Allison Park, PA |
| 37 | C | Nic Ericsson | R/R | 6 ft 2 in (1.88 m) | 200 lb (91 kg) | RS Jr | Dale City, VA |
| 38 | LHP | Jack Goleski | L/L | 6 ft 3 in (1.91 m) | 195 lb (88 kg) | So | Atlee, VA |
| 39 | RHP | Zachary Peters | R/R | 6 ft 3 in (1.91 m) | 200 lb (91 kg) | Fr | Pawling, NY |
| 40 | INF | Will Carlone | R/R | 6 ft 2 in (1.88 m) | 205 lb (93 kg) | RS Jr | West Seneca, NY |
| 41 | RHP | Brian Curley | R/R | 5 ft 10 in (1.78 m) | 200 lb (91 kg) | Fr | Midlothian, VA |
| 43 | LHP | Cade Dressler | L/L | 6 ft 2 in (1.88 m) | 225 lb (102 kg) | So | Mifflinburg, PA |
| 44 | | Cam Nuckols | R/R | 6 ft 4 in (1.93 m) | 225 lb (102 kg) | Fr | Chesterfield, VA |
| 45 | INF | Art Schoenstadt | L/R | 5 ft 7 in (1.7 m) | 170 lb (77 kg) | Gr | Sammamish, WA |
| 46 | LHP | Campbell Ellis | L/L | 6 ft 4 in (1.93 m) | 215 lb (98 kg) | Jr | Georgetown, ON |
| 50 | RHP | Justin Humenay | R/R | 6 ft 0 in (1.83 m) | 195 lb (88 kg) | Jr | Montreal, QC |
| 55 | RHP | Maison Martinez | R/R | 6 ft 2 in (1.88 m) | 210 lb (95 kg) | Fr | Lake Worth, FL |

Head coach

Bradley LeCroy

Assistant coach(es)

Andrew Cox
Tanner Gordon
Andrew Llewellyn

Legend

- (C) Team captain
- (S) Suspended
- (I) Ineligible
- Injured
- Current redshirt

Roster
Last update: February 5, 2023

=== Coaching staff ===
2022 VCU Rams baseball coaching staff
| Name | Position | Seasons at VCU | Alma mater |
|---|---|---|---|
| Bradley LeCroy | Head coach | 1 | Clemson University (2000) |
| Andrew Cox | Assistant Coach | 1 | Clemson University (2017) |
| Tanner Gordon | Assistant Coach | 1 | Trevecca Nazarene University (2019) |
| Andrew Llewellyn | Assistant Coach | 3 | Wingate University (2020) |

== Offseason ==
=== Departures ===
VCU Departures
| Name | Number | Pos. | Height | Weight | Year | Hometown | Notes |
|---|---|---|---|---|---|---|---|
| Marcus O'Malley | 1 | INF | 5 ft 9 in (1.75 m) | 161 | Fr. | Naples, Florida | Transferred to FIU |
| Michael Haydak | 2 | INF | 5 ft 11 in (1.80 m) | 190 | RS-Jr. | Tampa, Florida | Transferred to Southeastern |
| Connor Hujsak | 3 | INF | 6 ft 2 in (1.88 m) | 195 | So. | Goffstown, New Hampshire | Transferred to Mississippi State |
| Ryan Recio | 4 | INF | 6 ft 2 in (1.88 m) | 184 | Fr. | Boca Raton, Florida | Did not return |
| Aaron Barber | 8 | INF | 5 ft 7 in (1.70 m) | 190 | RS-So. | Seattle, Washington | Transferred to Pacific Lutheran |
| Edwin Serrano | 10 | RHP | 5 ft 11 in (1.80 m) | 165 | RS-Sr. | Haines City, Florida | Graduated |
| Brendan Roney | 14 | C | 5 ft 10 in (1.78 m) | 185 | RS-Fr. | Cudjoe Key, Florida | Transferred to FIU |
| Joey Perkins | 16 | LHP | 6 ft 3 in (1.91 m) | 215 | RS-Jr. | Lebanon, Ohio | Did not return |
| Brendan Wilkinson | 18 | RHP | 6 ft 1 in (1.85 m) | 180 | Fr. | West Milton, Ohio | Did not return |
| Jaden Griffin | 20 | LHP | 6 ft 0 in (1.83 m) | 205 | RS-Jr. | Lower Sackville, Nova Scotia | Did not return |
| Zach Boswell | 22 | RHP | 5 ft 10 in (1.78 m) | 185 | RS-Jr. | Snohomish, Washington | Did not return |
| Ethan Mishra | 23 | RHP | 6 ft 3 in (1.91 m) | 200 | Fr. | Washington, D.C. | Transferred to Tulane |
| Maddison Furman | 24 | LHP | 5 ft 9 in (1.75 m) | 185 | RS-Jr. | Richmond, Virginia | Graduated |
| Jack Masloff | 25 | LHP | 6 ft 2 in (1.88 m) | 185 | RS-So. | Charlottesville, Virginia | Signed by Detroit Tigers |
| Tyler Locklear | 28 | INF | 6 ft 3 in (1.91 m) | 210 | RS-So. | Abingdon, Maryland | Drafted by Seattle Mariners |
| Virot Siharath | 30 | INF | 6 ft 3 in (1.91 m) | 210 | Fr. | Keswick, Ontario | Did not return |
| Ben Nippolt | 34 | INF | 5 ft 10 in (1.78 m) | 165 | RS-So. | St. Paul, Minnesota | Transferred to LSU |
| Nolan Wilson | 38 | RHP | 6 ft 3 in (1.91 m) | 215 | Gr. | Atlanta, Georgia | Graduated |
| Evan Chenier | 39 | RHP | 6 ft 5 in (1.96 m) | 215 | RS-Jr. | Georgetown, Ontario | Transferred to FIU |
| Chase Hungate | 41 | INF | 6 ft 5 in (1.96 m) | 175 | Fr. | Abingdon, Virginia | Transferred to Virginia |
| Tyler Coy | 44 | C | 6 ft 3 in (1.91 m) | 230 | So. | Williamsville, New York | Did not return |
| Tyler Davis | 45 | LHP | 6 ft 2 in (1.88 m) | 230 | RS-So. | Newport News, Virginia | Transferred to Mississippi State |
| Braedin Hunt | 55 | RHP | 6 ft 2 in (1.88 m) | 210 | RS-Fr. | Old Bridge, New Jersey | Did not return |

=== Transfers ===
Incoming transfers
| Name | Number | Pos. | Height | Weight | Year | Hometown | Previous School |
|---|---|---|---|---|---|---|---|
| Christian Gordon | 1 | LHP | 6 ft 0 in (1.83 m) | 180 | Jr. | Agricola, Virginia | Liberty |
| Brandon Eike | 2 | INF | 6 ft 0 in (1.83 m) | 220 | So. | Powhatan, Virginia | North Carolina |
| Harrison Long | 8 | INF | 5 ft 10 in (1.78 m) | 175 | So. | Sarasota, Florida | Jacksonville |
| William Bean | 10 | INF | 5 ft 11 in (1.80 m) | 180 | Jr. | Great Falls, Virginia | West Virginia |
| Jake Thilges | 25 | 3B | 6 ft 2 in (1.88 m) | 165 | RS-So. | Johnston, Iowa | Des Moines Area CC |
| Justin Walton | 30 | RHP | 6 ft 0 in (1.83 m) | 180 | Gr. | Glen Allen, Virginia | Norfolk State |
| Brendan Erka | 36 | RHP | 6 ft 2 in (1.88 m) | 195 | RS-So. | Allison Park, Pennsylvania | Harford CC |
| Jack Goleski | 38 | LHP | 6 ft 3 in (1.91 m) | 195 | So. | Mechanicsville, Virginia | Pitt CC |

=== Signing Day Recruits ===
The following players signed National Letter of Intents to play for VCU in 2023.

| Player | Hometown | High School |
Pitchers
| Evan Bert | Harrisonburg, Virginia | Harrisonburg (VA) |
| Brian Curley | Midlothian, Virginia | Trinity Episcopal (VA) |
| James Gladden | Baltimore, Maryland | Archbishop Curley |
| Maison Martinez | Lake Worth, Florida | Park Vista |
| Cam Nuckols | Chesterfield, Virginia | St. Christopher's (VA) |
| Zachary Peters | Pawling, New York | Trinity-Pawling |
| Ethan Serrano | Mechanicsville, Virginia | Mechanicsville (VA) |
| Devan Zirwas | Imperial, Pennsylvania | West Allegheny |
Hitters
| Gavyn Boyle | Gasport, New York | P27 Academy |
| Ethan Brooks | Glen Allen, Virginia | Glen Allen |
| Aden Hill | Mechanicsville, Maryland | P27 Academy |
| Macho Santiago | Richmond, Virginia | Douglas S. Freeman |
| Austin Younce | Chesapeake, Virginia | Greenbrier Christian |

=== 2022 MLB draft ===
| Round | Pick | Player | Position | MLB Team |
|---|---|---|---|---|
| #2 | #58 | Tyler Locklear | 3B | Seattle Mariners |

== Game log ==
2023 VCU Rams baseball game log (25–30)
Regular season (25–30)

February (2–5)
| Date | Time (ET) | TV | Opponent | Rank | Stadium | Score | Win | Loss | Save | Attendance | Overall | Atlantic 10 | Source |
Coastal Carolina Tournament
| February 17 | 11:00 a.m. | | vs. Middle Tennessee* | | Springs Brooks Stadium; Conway, SC | L 8–14 | Hamm (1–0) | Ellis (0–1) | None | 1,032 | 0–1 | — | Box Score |
| February 18 | 11:00 a.m. | | vs. Fairfield* | | Springs Brooks Stadium | W 10–3 | Gordon (1–0) | Ostensen (0–1) | Dressler (1) | 1,021 | 1–1 | — | Box Score |
| February 19 | 2:30 p.m. | ESPN+ | at Coastal Carolina* | | Springs Brooks Stadium | W 4–2 | Peters (1–0) | Smith (1–1) | Erka (1) | 1,969 | 2–1 | — | Box Score |
| February 24 | 3:00 p.m. | ESPN+ | Sacred Heart* | | The Diamond; Richmond, VA | L 6–7^{10} | Briggs (1–0) | Erka (0–1) | None | 150 | 2–2 | — | Box Score |
| February 25 | 3:00 p.m. | ESPN+ | Sacred Heart* | | The Diamond | L 5–11 | Hawkins (1–0) | Gordon (1–1) | Costello (1) | 200 | 2–3 | — | Box Score |
| February 26 | 1:00 p.m. | ESPN+ | Sacred Heart* | | The Diamond | L 10–11^{10} | Boyian (1–0) | Delane (0–1) | Aufiero (1) | 200 | 2–4 | — | Box Score |
| February 28 | 4:00 p.m. | ACCNX | at No. 13 North Carolina* | | Boshamer Stadium; Chapel Hill, NC | L 4–10 | Peterson (1–0) | Peters (1–1) | None | 1,974 | 2–5 | — | Box Score |

March (12–7)
| Date | Time (ET) | TV | Opponent | Rank | Stadium | Score | Win | Loss | Save | Attendance | Overall | Atlantic 10 | Source |
|---|---|---|---|---|---|---|---|---|---|---|---|---|---|
| March 1 | 4:00 p.m. | ACCNX | at No. 13 North Carolina* | | Boshamer Stadium | L 10–14 | Eaise (1–1) | Walton (0–1) | None | 2,028 | 2–6 | — | Box Score |
Central Virginia Classic
| March 3 | 3:00 p.m. | ESPN+ | Canisius* | | The Diamond | Canceled (inclement weather) | | | | | 2–6 | — | Report |
| March 4 | 1:00 p.m. | ESPN+ | West Virginia* | | The Diamond | L 5–8 | Traxel (2–1) | Ellis (0–2) | None | 500 | 2–7 | — | Box Score |
| March 5 | 11:00 a.m. | ESPN+ | Fairfield* | | The Diamond | W 9–3^{7} | Gordon (2–1) | Ostensen (0–3) | None | 250 | 3–7 | — | Box Score |
| March 5 (Note: The Fairfield game on March 5 became a doubleheader due to the March 3 game being canceled due to inclement weather.) | 2:00 p.m. | ESPN+ | Fairfield* | | The Diamond | L 2–5^{7} | Erbeck (1–0) | Erka (0–2) | Baker (1) | 200 | 3–8 | — | Box Score |
| March 7 | 4:00 p.m. | | at Liberty* | | Liberty Baseball Stadium; Lynchburg, VA | L 0–10 | Gainey (3–0) | Delane (1–1) | None | 1,175 | 3–9 | — | Box Score |
| March 8 | 4:00 p.m. | | at James Madison* | | Eagle Field; Harrisonburg, VA | L 5–19 | Czerwinski (1–0) | Curley (0–1) | None | 247 | 3–10 | — | Box Score |
| March 10 | 2:00 p.m. | ESPN+ | Cornell* | | The Diamond | W 14–9 | Ellis (1–2) | Keller (0–2) | None | 500 | 4–10 | — | Box Score |
| March 11 | 2:00 p.m. | ESPN+ | Cornell* | | The Diamond | W 10–5 | Gladden (1–0) | Hamill (0–3) | None | 200 | 5–10 | — | Box Score |
| March 12 | 11:00 a.m. | ESPN+ | Cornell* | | The Diamond | W 9–3 | Delane (1–2) | Edwards (0–1) | None | 250 | 6–10 | — | Report |
| March 14 | 3:00 p.m. | ESPN+ | James Madison* | | The Diamond | L 6–14 | Cone (3–0) | Bert (0–1) | None | 250 | 6–11 | — | Box Score |
| March 17 | 3:00 p.m. | ESPN+ | NJIT* | | The Diamond | W 5–4^{10} | Ellis (2–2) | Reiner (0–2) | None | 300 | 7–11 | — | Box Score |
| March 18 | 2:00 p.m. | ESPN+ | NJIT* | | The Diamond | W 12–4 | Gladden (2–0) | de Jong (0–2) | None | 250 | 8–11 | — | Box Score |
| March 19 | 1:00 p.m. | ESPN+ | NJIT* | | The Diamond | W 1–0 | Delane (2–2) | Georgini (2–1) | None | 300 | 9–11 | — | Box Score |
| March 21 | 6:00 p.m. | MASN | Longwood* | | The Diamond | W 5–2 | Bert (1–1) | Cole Taylor (0–4) | Ellis (1) | 250 | 10–11 | — | Box Score |
| March 24 | 6:30 p.m. | ESPN+ | at South Florida* | | USF Baseball Stadium; Tampa, FL | W 18–3 | Gladden (3–0) | Dorsey (2–2) | None | 1,396 | 11–11 | — | Box Score |
| March 25 | 2:00 p.m. | ESPN+ | at South Florida* | | USF Baseball Stadium | L 0–9 | Mink (4–2) | Peters (1–2) | Hudi (1) | 933 | 11–12 | — | Box Score |
| March 26 | 1:00 p.m. | ESPN+ | at South Florida* | | USF Baseball Stadium | W 25–15 | Ellis (3–2) | Jackson (0–1) | None | 1,114 | 12–12 | — | Box Score |
| March 28 | 6:00 p.m. | MASN | Norfolk State* | | The Diamond | W 13–4 | Goleski (1–0) | Manzer (1–2) | None | 648 | 13–12 | — | Box Score |
| March 31 | 6:00 p.m. | ESPN+ | St. Bonaventure | | The Diamond | W 23–9 | Martinez (1–0) | Lintell (0–3) | None | 650 | 14–12 | 1–0 | Box Score |

April (8–10)
| Date | Time (ET) | TV | Opponent | Rank | Stadium | Score | Win | Loss | Save | Attendance | Overall | Atlantic 10 | Source |
|---|---|---|---|---|---|---|---|---|---|---|---|---|---|
| April 1 | 2:00 p.m. | ESPN3 | St. Bonaventure | | The Diamond | L 6–7 | Devine (1–1) | Gladden (3–1) | O'Connell (1) | 367 | 14–13 | 1–1 | Box Score |
| April 2 | 1:00 p.m. | ESPN+ | St. Bonaventure | | The Diamond | W 13–1 | Bert (2–1) | Breen (1–1) | None | 500 | 15–13 | 2–1 | Box Score |
| April 4 | 6:00 p.m. | ESPN+ | VMI* | | The Diamond | W 6–4 | Curley (1–1) | Wright (0–1) | Ellis (2) | 496 | 16–13 | — | Box Score |
| April 7 | 3:00 p.m. | | at Saint Joseph's | | Smithson Field; Merion Station, PA | L 3–5 | McCausland (3–1) | Gordon (2–2) | McShane (1) | 274 | 16–14 | 2–2 | Box Score |
| April 8 | 2:00 p.m. | ESPN3 | at Saint Joseph's | | Smithson Field | L 3–12 | Stetzar (2–2) | Peters (1–3) | None | 308 | 16–15 | 2–3 | Box Score |
| April 9 | 1:00 p.m. | | at Saint Joseph's | | Smithson Field | W 11–7 | Ellis (4–2) | Shearer (0–1) | None | 302 | 17–15 | 3–3 | Box Score |
| April 11 | 5:00 p.m. | FloSports | at William & Mary* | | Plumeri Park; Williamsburg, VA | L 12–13 | McDonough (1–0) | Curley (1–2) | Lovasz (5) | 381 | 17–16 | — | Box Score |
George Mason–VCU Series
| April 14 | 6:00 p.m. | ESPN+ | George Mason | | The Diamond | W 5–0 | Peters (2–3) | Shields (5–2) | Erka (2) | 451 | 18–16 | 4–3 | Box Score |
| April 15 | 2:00 p.m. | ESPN+ | George Mason | | The Diamond | L 5–10 | Gartland (4–2) | Ellis (4–3) | None | 716 | 18–17 | 4–4 | Box Score |
| April 16 | 1:00 p.m. | ESPN+ | George Mason | | The Diamond | W 11–3 | Gladden (4–1) | Eaton (1–2) | None | 508 | 19–17 | 5–4 | Box Score |
Duel at the Diamond
| April 18 | 7:00 p.m. | WUPV/ESPN+ | No. 8 Virginia* | | The Diamond | L 6–19 | Early (8–1) | Nuckols (0–1) | None | 3,324 | 19–18 | — | Box Score |
| April 21 | 3:00 p.m. | ESPN+ | at George Washington | | Barcroft Park; Arlington, VA | L 2–9 | Koester (4–2) | Peters (2–4) | None | 304 | 19–19 | 5–5 | Box Score |
| April 22 | 11:30 a.m. (Note: The George Washington game on April 22 was suspended in the 7th inning due to inclement weather, the game resumed at 12:00 p.m. on April 23. VCU was leading 11–3 at the time of suspension. The April 23 game originally scheduled for 12:00 p.m. was postponed to 3:30 p.m.) | ESPN+ | at George Washington | | Barcroft Park | W 11–4 | Ellis (5–3) | Brennan (2–2) | Frazier (1) | 202 | 20–19 | 6–5 | Box Score |
| April 23 | 3:30 p.m. | ESPN+ | at George Washington | | Barcroft Park | L 2–3 | Kahler (3–3) | Gladden (4–2) | None | 193 | 20–20 | 6–6 | Box Score |
Old Dominion–VCU Series
| April 25 | 6:00 p.m. | WUPV | Old Dominion* | | The Diamond | L 4–11 | Bashara (2–0) | Goleski (1–1) | None | 645 | 20–21 | — | Box Score |
| April 28 | 6:00 p.m. | ESPN+ | Saint Louis | | The Diamond | W 10–6 | Erka (1–2) | Gray (1–1) | None | 349 | 21–21 | 7–6 | Box Score |
| April 29 | 1:00 p.m. | ESPN+ | Saint Louis | | The Diamond | L 5–10 | Weber (2–2) | Ellis (5–4) | None | 350 | 21–22 | 7–7 | Box Score |
| April 29 | 5:00 p.m. | ESPN+ | Saint Louis | | The Diamond | W 7–6^{11} | Curley (2–2) | Dumont (0–1) | None | 480 | 22–22 | 8–7 | Box Score |

May (3–8)
| Date | Time (ET) | TV | Opponent | Rank | Stadium | Score | Win | Loss | Save | Attendance | Overall | Atlantic 10 | Source |
|---|---|---|---|---|---|---|---|---|---|---|---|---|---|
| May 2 | 6:00 p.m. | ACCNX | at No. 21 Virginia* | | Davenport Field; Charlottesville, VA | L 6–11 | Hodges (2–0) | Bert (2–2) | None | 2,676 | 22–23 | — | Box Score |
| May 4 | 12:00 p.m. | ESPN+ | at Davidson | | T. Henry Wilson Jr. Field; Davidson, NC | L 5–13 | Feczko (6–4) | Erka (1–3) | None | 232 | 22–24 | 8–8 | Box Score |
| May 5 | 2:00 p.m. | ESPN+ | at Davidson | | T. Henry Wilson Jr. Field | W 9–4 | Gladden (5–2) | Fix (2–2) | Ellis (3) | 335 | 23–24 | 9–8 | Box Score |
| May 6 | 1:00 p.m. | ESPN+ | at Davidson | | T. Henry Wilson Jr. Field | L 10–14 | Flynn (4–0) | Peters (2–5) | None | 431 | 23–25 | 9–9 | Box Score |
| May 9 | 6:00 p.m. | | at Longwood* | | Bolding Stadium; Farmville, VA | L 6–8 | Bunch (1–1) | Frazier (0–1) | Berrier (1) | 396 | 23–26 | — | Box Score |
Capital City Series
| May 12 | 6:00 p.m. | | Richmond | | The Diamond | L 10–16 | Rodriguez (3–2) | Campbell (5–5) | None | 739 | 23–27 | 9–10 | Box Score |
| May 13 | 2:00 p.m. | | Richmond | | The Diamond | W 9–8 | Peters (3–5) | Argomaniz (2–6) | None | 441 | 24–27 | 10–10 | Box Score |
| May 14 | 1:00 p.m. | | Richmond | | The Diamond | W 4–3 | Erka (2–3) | Mathes (0–2) | None | 495 | 25–27 | 11–10 | Box Score |
| May 16 | 6:00 p.m. | | at Old Dominion* | | Bud Metheny Baseball Complex; Norfolk, VA | Canceled (inclement weather) | | | | | 25–27 | — | |
| May 18 | 12:00 p.m. | ESPN+ | at Rhode Island | | Bill Beck Field; Kingston, RI | L 5–8 | Sposato (4–6) | Gladden (5–3) | Urena (1) | 192 | 25–28 | 11–11 | Box Score |
| May 19 | 2:00 p.m. | | at Rhode Island | | Bill Beck Field | L 5–7 | Levesque (6–4) | Curley (2–3) | Andrade (7) | 217 | 25–29 | 11–12 | Box Score |
| May 20 | 1:00 p.m. | ESPN+ | at Rhode Island | | Bill Beck Field | L 7–19 | Hsu (1–1) | Walton (0–2) | None | 192 | 25–30 | 11–13 | Box Score |

Legend: = Win = Loss = Canceled
Bold =VCU team member
Rankings are based on the team's current ranking in the D1Baseball poll.

Schedule Notes

== Statistics ==
=== Team batting ===
| Team | AB | Avg. | H | 2B | 3B | HR | RBI | BB | SO | SB |
|---|---|---|---|---|---|---|---|---|---|---|
| VCU | 0 | .000 | 0 | 0 | 0 | 0 | 0 | 0 | 0 | 0 |
| Opponents | 0 | .000 | 0 | 0 | 0 | 0 | 0 | 0 | 0 | 0 |

=== Team pitching ===
| Team | IP | H | R | ER | BB | SO | SV | ERA |
|---|---|---|---|---|---|---|---|---|
| VCU | 0.0 | 0 | 0 | 0 | 0 | 0 | 0 | 0.00 |
| Opponents | 0.0 | 0 | 0 | 0 | 0 | 0 | 0 | 0.00 |

=== Individual batting ===
Note: leaders must meet the minimum requirement of 2 PA/G and 75% of games played

| Player | GP | AB | Avg. | H | 2B | 3B | HR | RBI | BB | SO | SB |
|---|---|---|---|---|---|---|---|---|---|---|---|
| Brandon Eike | 0 | 0 | .000 | 0 | 0 | 0 | 0 | 0 | 0 | 0 | 0 |
| Ethan Brooks | 0 | 0 | .000 | 0 | 0 | 0 | 0 | 0 | 0 | 0 | 0 |
| Griffin Boone | 0 | 0 | .000 | 0 | 0 | 0 | 0 | 0 | 0 | 0 | 0 |
| Harrison Long | 0 | 0 | .000 | 0 | 0 | 0 | 0 | 0 | 0 | 0 | 0 |
| William Bean | 0 | 0 | .000 | 0 | 0 | 0 | 0 | 0 | 0 | 0 | 0 |
| Jesse Robinson Jr. | 0 | 0 | .000 | 0 | 0 | 0 | 0 | 0 | 0 | 0 | 0 |
| AJ Mathis | 0 | 0 | .000 | 0 | 0 | 0 | 0 | 0 | 0 | 0 | 0 |
| Gavyn Boyle | 0 | 0 | .000 | 0 | 0 | 0 | 0 | 0 | 0 | 0 | 0 |
| Austin Younce | 0 | 0 | .000 | 0 | 0 | 0 | 0 | 0 | 0 | 0 | 0 |
| John Lucas | 0 | 0 | .000 | 0 | 0 | 0 | 0 | 0 | 0 | 0 | 0 |
| Macho Santiago | 0 | 0 | .000 | 0 | 0 | 0 | 0 | 0 | 0 | 0 | 0 |
| Logan Amiss | 0 | 0 | .000 | 0 | 0 | 0 | 0 | 0 | 0 | 0 | 0 |
| Aden Hill | 0 | 0 | .000 | 0 | 0 | 0 | 0 | 0 | 0 | 0 | 0 |
| Jake Thilges | 0 | 0 | .000 | 0 | 0 | 0 | 0 | 0 | 0 | 0 | 0 |
| Cooper Benzin | 0 | 0 | .000 | 0 | 0 | 0 | 0 | 0 | 0 | 0 | 0 |
| Devan Barnett | 0 | 0 | .000 | 0 | 0 | 0 | 0 | 0 | 0 | 0 | 0 |

=== Individual pitching ===
Note: leaders must meet the minimum requirement of 1 IP/G

| Player | GP | GS | W | L | IP | H | R | ER | BB | SO | SV | ERA |
|---|---|---|---|---|---|---|---|---|---|---|---|---|
| Christian Gordon | 0 | 0 | 0 | 0 | 0.0 | 0 | 0 | 0 | 0 | 0 | 0 | 0.00 |
| James Gladden | 0 | 0 | 0 | 0 | 0.0 | 0 | 0 | 0 | 0 | 0 | 0 | 0.00 |
| Nick Frazier | 0 | 0 | 0 | 0 | 0.0 | 0 | 0 | 0 | 0 | 0 | 0 | 0.00 |
| Devan Zirwas | 0 | 0 | 0 | 0 | 0.0 | 0 | 0 | 0 | 0 | 0 | 0 | 0.00 |
| Justin Walton | 0 | 0 | 0 | 0 | 0.0 | 0 | 0 | 0 | 0 | 0 | 0 | 0.00 |
| Evan Bert | 0 | 0 | 0 | 0 | 0.0 | 0 | 0 | 0 | 0 | 0 | 0 | 0.00 |
| Mason Delane | 0 | 0 | 0 | 0 | 0.0 | 0 | 0 | 0 | 0 | 0 | 0 | 0.00 |
| Brendan Erka | 0 | 0 | 0 | 0 | 0.0 | 0 | 0 | 0 | 0 | 0 | 0 | 0.00 |
| Jack Goleski | 0 | 0 | 0 | 0 | 0.0 | 0 | 0 | 0 | 0 | 0 | 0 | 0.00 |
| Zachary Peters | 0 | 0 | 0 | 0 | 0.0 | 0 | 0 | 0 | 0 | 0 | 0 | 0.00 |
| Brian Curley | 0 | 0 | 0 | 0 | 0.0 | 0 | 0 | 0 | 0 | 0 | 0 | 0.00 |
| Cade Dressler | 0 | 0 | 0 | 0 | 0.0 | 0 | 0 | 0 | 0 | 0 | 0 | 0.00 |
| Cam Nuckols | 0 | 0 | 0 | 0 | 0.0 | 0 | 0 | 0 | 0 | 0 | 0 | 0.00 |
| Campbell Ellis | 0 | 0 | 0 | 0 | 0.0 | 0 | 0 | 0 | 0 | 0 | 0 | 0.00 |
| Justin Humenay | 0 | 0 | 0 | 0 | 0.0 | 0 | 0 | 0 | 0 | 0 | 0 | 0.00 |
| Maison Martinez | 0 | 0 | 0 | 0 | 0.0 | 0 | 0 | 0 | 0 | 0 | 0 | 0.00 |

Legend
| GP | Games played | GS | Games started | AB | At-bats |
| H | Hits | Avg. | Batting average | 2B | Doubles |
| 3B | Triples | HR | Home runs | RBI | Runs batted in |
| IP | Innings pitched | W | Wins | L | Losses |
| ERA | Earned run average | SO | Strikeouts | BB | Base on balls |
| SV | Saves | SB | Stolen bases | High | Team high |

== Rankings ==
Ranking movements Legend: ██ Increase in ranking ██ Decrease in ranking — = Not ranked RV = Received votes
| | Week | | | | | | | | | | | | | | | | | | | |
| Poll | Pre | 1 | 2 | 3 | 4 | 5 | 6 | 7 | 8 | 9 | 10 | 11 | 12 | 13 | 14 | 15 | 16 | 17 | 18 | Final |
|---|---|---|---|---|---|---|---|---|---|---|---|---|---|---|---|---|---|---|---|---|
| Coaches' | — | —* | — | — | — | — | — | — | — | — | — | — | — | — | — | — | — | — | — | — |
| Baseball America | — | — | — | — | — | — | — | — | — | — | — | — | — | — | — | — | — | — | — | — |
| Collegiate Baseball^ | RV | — | — | — | — | — | — | — | — | — | — | — | — | — | — | — | — | — | — | — |
| NCBWA† | — | RV | — | — | — | — | — | — | — | — | — | — | — | — | — | — | — | — | — | — |
| D1Baseball | — | — | — | — | — | — | — | — | — | — | — | — | — | — | — | — | — | — | — | — |

^ Collegiate Baseball ranked 40 teams in their preseason poll, but only ranked 30 teams weekly during the season.
† NCBWA ranks 30 teams in their preseason poll, but only ranks 25 teams weekly during the season.
* A new poll was not released for this week, so for comparison purposes, the previous week's ranking is inserted in this week's slot.
