= 2024 George Mason Patriots baseball team =

American college baseball season

2024 George Mason Patriots baseball
- Conference: Atlantic 10 Conference
- Record: 21–32 (7–17 A-10)
- Head coach: Shawn Camp (2nd season)
- Assistant coaches: Tyler Nelin (1st season); Evan Duhon (1st season); Kyle Darmstead (1st season)
- Home stadium: Spuhler Field

2024 Atlantic 10 Conference baseball standings
	Conf.				Overall
Team	W		L	PCT	W		L	PCT
Saint Louis ‍†‍‍	16	–	8	.667	37	–	16	.698
VCU ‍‍‡‍^{y}	15	–	8	.652	37	–	21	.638
Dayton ‍‍‍	14	–	9	.609	33	–	22	.600
George Washington ‍‍‍	13	–	11	.542	31	–	26	.544
Saint Joseph's ‍‍‍	13	–	11	.542	29	–	26	.527
Richmond ‍‍‍	13	–	11	.542	27	–	32	.458
UMass ‍‍‍	13	–	11	.542	24	–	29	.453
Rhode Island ‍‍‍	11	–	13	.458	19	–	28	.404
Davidson ‍‍‍	10	–	14	.417	24	–	28	.462
Fordham ‍‍‍	10	–	14	.417	19	–	33	.365
St. Bonaventure ‍‍‍	8	–	16	.333	18	–	31	.367
George Mason ‍‍‍	7	–	17	.292	21	–	32	.396
† – Conference champion ‡ – Tournament champion y – Invited to the NCAA tournament As of May 25, 2024; Rankings from D1Baseball

The 2024 George Mason Patriots baseball team represented George Mason University during the 2024 NCAA Division I baseball season. The Patriots played their home games at Spuhler Field as a member of the Atlantic 10 Conference. They were led by head coach Shawn Camp, in his fifth season at Mason, and his second as a head coach.

George Mason was entering the season as the defending Atlantic 10 Conference baseball tournament champions.

== Previous season ==
George Mason is entering the season off of one of its most successful seasons in program history, having clinched their fourth-ever conference tournament championship, their second Atlantic 10 Conference tournament title, and their first in the A-10 since 2014.

The Patriots finished the 2023 season 36–27 record, with a conference record of 13–10. Starting pitcher, Chad Gartland, was named the 2023 Atlantic 10 Conference Pitcher of the Year.

In the 2023 NCAA Division I baseball tournament, George Mason entered the Winston-Salem Regional as the fourth seed, facing off against the third-seeded Northeastern of the CAA, the second-seeded Maryland of the Big Ten, and the top-seeded hosts, Wake Forest of the ACC. Mason went 2–2 in the tournament, defeating Northeastern and Maryland, but losing twice to Wake Forest.

== Preseason ==
=== Preseason Atlantic 10 awards and honors ===
Connor Dykstra, Chad Gartland, and South Triumble were named to the All-Atlantic 10 Preseason team, while Gartland was also named the Preseason Pitcher of the Year.

Preseason All-Atlantic 10 Team
Player	No.	Position	Class
Connor Dykstra	16	C	Junior
Chad Gartland	21	SP	Junior
South Trimble	3	2B	Graduate

=== Coaches poll ===
The coaches poll was released on February 14, 2024. George Mason was picked to finish second in the conference and received two first-place votes.

Coaches' Poll
Pos.	Team	Points
1	Saint Louis	125 (3)
2	George Mason	121 (2)
3	Saint Joseph's	114 (1)
4	Davidson	113 (2)
5	VCU	97 (2)
6	Dayton	96 (1)
7	Rhode Island	77 (1)
8	Richmond	63
9	George Washington	51
10	Fordham	38
11	UMass	22
12	St. Bonaventure	19

== Rankings ==
Ranking movements Legend: — = Not ranked
	Week																			
Poll	Pre	1	2	3	4	5	6	7	8	9	10	11	12	13	14	15	16	17	18	Final
Coaches'	—	—*	—	—	—	—	—	—	—	—	—	—	—	—	—	—	—	—	—	—
Baseball America	—	—	—	—	—	—	—	—	—	—	—	—	—	—	—	—	—	—	—	—
NCBWA†	—	—	—	—	—	—	—	—	—	—	—	—	—	—	—	—	—	—	—	—
D1Baseball	—	—	—	—	—	—	—	—	—	—	—	—	—	—	—	—	—	—	—	—
Perfect Game	—	—	—	—	—	—	—	—	—	—	—	—	—	—	—	—	—	—	—	—

† NCBWA ranks 30 teams in their preseason poll, but only ranks 25 teams weekly during the season.
* A new poll was not released for this week, so for comparison purposes, the previous week's ranking is inserted in this week's slot.
