= Bradley LeCroy =

American baseball coach (born 1979)

Current position
- Title: Head coach
- Team: Liberty
- Conference: Conference USA
- Record: 73–48 (.603)

Biographical details
- Born: January 13, 1979 (age 47)

Playing career
- 1997–2000: Clemson
- Position: Shortstop

Coaching career (HC unless noted)
- 2001–2002: Anderson (SC) (RC)
- 2003–2005: Clemson (asst.)
- 2006–2007: Western Carolina (asst.)
- 2008–2010: Tennessee (asst.)
- 2011–2022: Clemson (asst.)
- 2023–2024: VCU
- 2025–present: Liberty

Head coaching record
- Overall: 135–99 (.577)
- Tournaments: A-10: 4–0; CUSA: 4–2; NCAA: 3–4

Accomplishments and honors

Championships
- A-10 Tournament: 2024

Bradley LeCroy (born January 13, 1979) is an American baseball coach who currently coaches the Liberty Flames baseball program. Prior to Liberty, he served as the head coach for Virginia Commonwealth University for two seasons and was a long-time assistant coach at Clemson University as well as an assistant coach at the University of Tennessee and Western Carolina University.

== Career ==
LeCroy played college baseball with Clemson as a shortstop from 1997 through 2000, and was part of the 2000 team that advanced to the College World Series. After graduating from Clemson, LeCroy served as an assistant coach at Anderson University. LeCroy subsequently returned to Clemson to serve as a volunteer assistant coach from 2003 until 2005, before serving as an assistant at Western Carolina and then Tennessee through 2010. Ahead of the 2011 NCAA Division I baseball season, LeCroy returned to Clemson as an assistant coach where he served part of the staff through 2022.

On August 4, 2022, LeCroy was announced as the head coach for VCU's baseball team to replace the outgoing Shawn Stiffler. During the first season of LeCroy managing the team, the Rams finished 11–13, finishing ninth in the Atlantic 10 and missing out on playing in the 2023 Atlantic 10 Conference baseball tournament. During his second season, the team significantly improved, finishing second in the Atlantic 10, and winning the 2024 Atlantic 10 Conference baseball tournament.

On July 15, 2024, LeCroy was announced as the eighth head coach for Liberty University, replacing outgoing coach Scott Jackson who abruptly resigned.

=== Heading coaching record ===
Record table
Season	Team	Overall	Conference	Standing	Postseason
VCU Rams (Atlantic 10 Conference) (2023–2024)
2023	VCU	25–30	11–13	9th	
2024	VCU	38–23	15–8	2nd	NCAA Regional
VCU:		63–53	26–21		
Liberty Flames (Conference USA) (2025–present)
2025	Liberty	30–27	10–17	8th	C-USA tournament
2026	Liberty	43–21	21–9	2nd	NCAA Regional
Liberty:		73–48 (.603)	31–26 (.544)		
Total:		136–101 (.574)			
National champion Postseason invitational champion Conference regular season champion Conference regular season and conference tournament champion Division regular season champion Division regular season and conference tournament champion Conference tournament champion
