= Capital One Park =

Baseball stadium in Tysons, Virginia, US

- Interactive map of Capital One Park
- Location: Tysons, Virginia
- Coordinates: 38.9263137°N 77.2074607°W
- Owner: Capital One
- Operator: Capital One
- Capacity: 650
- Surface: Artificial turf
- Field size: Left Field: 335 ft Center Field: 411 ft Right Field: 335 ft

Construction
- Opened: March 31, 2023

Tenant
- Georgetown Hoyas baseball (2024–present)

Capital One Park is a baseball stadium located in Tysons, Virginia, on the campus of the headquarters of Capital One. The stadium has a seating capacity of 650 and features a synthetic turf field with a natural pitching mound, an electronic scoreboard, and professional lighting. It serves as the home stadium for the Georgetown Hoyas baseball program and hosts various collegiate and high school baseball events, including the Atlantic 10 Conference baseball tournament.

== History ==
Capital One Park opened on March 31, 2023, with a double-header between Marymount University and Centenary University from New Jersey. The stadium was constructed to meet NCAA standards and is part of the Capital One Center development in Tysons.

In 2024, Georgetown University announced that its baseball team would play a majority of its home games at Capital One Park. The stadium's amenities and location provided an enhanced experience for both players and fans.

The stadium has hosted several significant events, including the entire 2024 Old Dominion Athletic Conference baseball tournament (NCAA Division III) and the 2024 and 2025 Atlantic 10 Conference baseball tournaments (Division I). In 2025, the University of Rhode Island won its third Atlantic 10 Baseball Championship at Capital One Park, defeating George Mason 4–1 in the final.

=== Tournaments hosted at Capital One Park ===
Year	Tournament	Level	Winner	Reference
2024	Atlantic 10 Conference baseball tournament	NCAA Division I	VCU	
2024	Old Dominion Athletic Conference baseball tournament	NCAA Division III	Randolph-Macon	
2025	Atlantic 10 Conference baseball tournament	NCAA Division I	Rhode Island	
2025	Old Dominion Athletic Conference baseball tournament	NCAA Division III	Shenandoah	

== Facilities and usage ==
Capital One Park features 300 fixed seats and 350 bleacher seats along the third base line, a picnic area along the first base line, and a party deck in center field. The stadium is designed to accommodate collegiate and high school games, as well as summer leagues.

Since its opening, the stadium has served as the home of the Potomac League, a collegiate summer baseball league. The league plays its entire season at Capital One Park, providing local college players with a platform to compete during the summer months.
