= 2022 George Mason Patriots baseball team =

American college baseball season

2022 George Mason Patriots baseball
- Conference: Atlantic 10 Conference
- Record: 22–33 (13–11 A-10)
- Head coach: Bill Brown (41st season)
- Assistant coaches: Ryan Terrill (1st season); Kyle Wrighte (1st season); Tyler Nelin (1st season)
- Hitting coach: James Beasley (1st season)
- Pitching coach: Shawn Camp (3rd season)
- Home stadium: The Diamond

2022 Atlantic 10 Conference baseball standings
	Conf.						Overall
Team	W		L		T	PCT	W		L		T	PCT
Davidson ‍†‍‍	20	–	4	–	0	.833	43	–	13	–	0	.768
VCU ‍‍‡‍^{y}	19	–	5	–	0	.792	42	–	20	–	0	.677
Saint Louis ‍‍‍	14	–	9	–	0	.609	29	–	24	–	0	.547
Rhode Island ‍‍‍	14	–	10	–	0	.583	20	–	35	–	0	.364
George Mason ‍‍‍	13	–	11	–	0	.542	23	–	33	–	0	.411
Saint Joseph's ‍‍‍	12	–	11	–	0	.522	29	–	25	–	0	.537
Richmond ‍‍‍	11	–	13	–	0	.458	30	–	26	–	0	.536
Dayton ‍‍‍	10	–	14	–	0	.417	23	–	27	–	0	.460
George Washington ‍‍‍	10	–	14	–	0	.417	22	–	30	–	0	.423
Fordham ‍‍‍	9	–	15	–	0	.375	16	–	36	–	0	.308
UMass ‍‍‍	8	–	16	–	0	.333	22	–	26	–	1	.459
St. Bonaventure ‍‍‍	3	–	21	–	0	.125	6	–	39	–	0	.133
† – Conference champion ‡ – Tournament champion y – Invited to the NCAA tournament Rankings from D1Baseball

The 2022 George Mason Patriots baseball team represented George Mason University during the 2022 NCAA Division I baseball season. The Patriots played their home games at Spuhler Field as a member of the Atlantic 10 Conference. They were led by head coach Bill Brown, in his 41st season at Mason.

George Mason finished the season with a 22–33 record and a 13–11 record in Atlantic 10 play. They earned a berth into the 2022 Atlantic 10 Conference baseball tournament, where they were eliminated in game 8 by Richmond.

== Previous season ==
The 2021 team finished the season with a 14–29 (7–17 Atlantic 10) record, and finished in last place in the South Division of the Atlantic 10. They did not earn a berth into the 2021 Atlantic 10 Conference baseball tournament nor the 2021 NCAA Division I baseball tournament.

== Preseason ==
=== Coaches poll ===
The Atlantic 10 baseball coaches' poll was released on February 15, 2022. George Mason was picked to finish tenth in the Atlantic 10.

Coaches' Poll
Predicted finish	Team	Points
1	VCU	143 (11)
2	Dayton	122 (1)
3	Rhode Island	101
4	Saint Louis	94
5	Davidson	91
6	Fordham	83
7	George Washington	80
8	Richmond	76
9	Saint Joseph's	73
10	George Mason	33
11	UMass	26
12	St. Bonaventure	14

== Personnel ==
=== Roster ===
2022 George Mason Patriots baseball roster
Pitchers: 7 - Jared Lyons - Senior; 13 - Chris Ruckdeschel - Graduate; 15 - Jackson Baird - Freshman; 38 - Stephen Restuccio - Sophomore; 40 - Thomas Little - Freshman; 42 - Diego Barrett - Freshman; 43 - Ben Shields - Graduate; 45 - Christian Mracna - Sophomore; 46 - Jalen Grant - Freshman	Catchers: 10 - Tyler Cotten - Freshman; Infielders: 6 - Daniel Brooks - Graduate; 9 - Brett Stallings - Junior; 11 - Carsen Pracht - Freshman	Outfielders: 2 - Jordan Smith - Sophomore; 8 - Brett Ahalt - Freshman; 12 - Kamron Smith - Graduate; Utility: 5 - Danny Hosley - Graduate

== Game log ==
2022 George Mason Patriots baseball game log
Regular season

February
Date	Opponent	Rank	Site/stadium	Score	Win	Loss	Save	TV	Attendance	Overall record	A10 record
February 18	at Wofford*		Russell C. King Field; Spartanburg, SC	**W** 11–10	**Henson (1–0)**	Marchal (0–1)	**Gartland (1)**		287	1–0	—
February 19	at Wofford*		Russell C. King Field	**L** 4–12	Vitus (1–0)	**Posey (0–1)**	—		381	1–1	—
February 20	at Wofford*		Russell C. King Field	**L** 13–15	Rhadans (1–0)	**Mracna (0–1)**	—		331	1–2	—
February 23	at James Madison*		Russell C. King Field; Harrisonburg, VA	**L** 0–14	McDonnell (1–0)	**Mracna (0–2)**	—		584	1–3	—
Spartanburg Series
February 25	vs. Presbyterian*		Cleveland Harley Park; Spartanburg, SC	**W** 4–2	**Gartland (1–0)**	Howard (0–1)	**Posey (1)**		175	2–3	—
February 26	vs. Boston College*		Cleveland Harley Park	**W** 4–1	**Lyons (1–0)**	Coffey (0–1)	—		127	3–3	—
February 27	at USC Upstate*		Cleveland Harley Park	**L** 1–2	Davis (2–0)	Hosley (0–1)	—		347	3–4	—

March
Date	Opponent	Rank	Site/stadium	Score	Win	Loss	Save	TV	Attendance	Overall record	A10 record
March 2	Navy*		Spuhler Field; Fairfax, VA	**L** 6–7	Russell (1–0)	**Mracna (0–3)**	Jorgenson (1)		143	3–5	—
March 4	Monmouth*		Spuhler Field	**W** 11–5	**Lyons (2–0)**	Miller (1–1)	—		141	4–5	—
March 5	Monmouth*		Spuhler Field	**L** 7–9	Klepchick (1–1)	**Barrett (0–1)**	Interdonato (1)		230	4–6	—
March 6	Monmouth*		Spuhler Field	**W** 5–4	**Hosley (1–1)**	Hensey (0–2)	Posey (2)		160	5–6	—
March 9	at Wake Forest*		David F. Couch Ballpark; Winston-Salem, NC	**L** 2–14	Mascolo (1–0)	**Yount (0–1)**	—		352	5–7	—
March 11	Quinnipiac*		Spuhler Field	**L** 5–6	Garcia (2–2)	**Lyons (2–1)**	Hagan (1)	ESPN+	137	5–8	—
March 12	Quinnipiac*		Spuhler Field	**W** 8–4	**Peterson (1–0)**	Seitter (0–2)	**Posey (3)**	ESPN+	128	6–8	—
March 13	Quinnipiac*		Spuhler Field	**Canceled (inclement weather)**							
March 15	Coppin State*		Spuhler Field	**W** 9–3	**Hosley (2–1)**	Freudenburg (0–1)	—		50	7–8	—
March 16	Georgetown*		Spuhler Field	**L** 4–5	Bosch (2–1)	**Yount (0–2)**	Tonas (3)	ESPN+	74	7–9	—
March 18	at William & Mary*		Plumeri Park; Williamsburg, VA	**L** 3–9				ESPN+		7–10	—
March 19	William & Mary*		Spuhler Field	**L** 1–2				ESPN+		7–11	—
March 20	William & Mary*		Spuhler Field	**L** 5–9				ESPN+		7–12	—
March 23	at Mount St. Mary's*		Straw Family Stadium; Emmitsburg, MD	**Canceled (inclement weather)**							
March 25	at The Citadel*		Joseph P. Riley Jr. Park; Charleston, SC	**L** 3–6						7–13	—
March 26	at The Citadel*		Joseph P. Riley Jr. Park	**L** 4–5						7–14	—
March 27	at The Citadel*		Joseph P. Riley Jr. Park	**W** 6–4						8–14	—
March 30	Maryland*		Spuhler Field	**L** 1–3						8–15	—

April
Date	Opponent	Rank	Site/stadium	Score	Win	Loss	Save	TV	Attendance	Overall record	A10 record
April 1	VCU; Rivalry		Spuhler Field	**W** 7–6	**Lyons (3–3)**	Hungate (3–2)	**Gartland (2)**	ESPN+	133	9–15	1–0
April 2	VCU; Rivalry		Spuhler Field	**L** 2–9	Tyler (2–2)	**Shields (0–2)**	—	ESPN+	226	9–16	1–1
April 3	VCU; Rivalry		Spuhler Field	**L** 5–15	Masloff (2–1)	**Posey (0–2)**	—	ESPN+	207	9–17	1–2
April 5	at Maryland*		Turtle Smith Stadium; College Park, MD	**L** 5–8						9–18	—
April 8	at Saint Joseph's		Smithson Field; Philadelphia, PA								
April 9	at Saint Joseph's		Smithson Field								
April 10	at Saint Joseph's		Smithson Field								
April 12	at Longwood*		Bolding Stadium; Farmville, VA								
April 15	Saint Louis		Spuhler Field								
April 16	Saint Louis		Spuhler Field								
April 17	Saint Louis		Spuhler Field								
April 20	James Madison*		Spuhler Field								
April 22	Fordham		Spuhler Field								
April 23	Fordham		Spuhler Field								
April 24	Fordham		Spuhler Field								
April 26	Longwood*		Spuhler Field								
April 27	at Virginia*		Davenport Field; Charlottesville, VA								
April 29	at UMass		Earl Lorden Field; Amherst, MA								
April 30	at UMass		Earl Lorden Field								

May
Date	Opponent	Rank	Site/stadium	Score	Win	Loss	Save	TV	Attendance	Overall record	A10 record
May 1	at UMass		Earl Lorden Field								
May 3	Towson*		Spuhler Field								
May 3	at Mount St. Mary's*		Straw Family Stadium								
May 6	at Richmond		Malcolm U. Pitt Field; Tuckahoe, VA								
May 7	at Richmond		Malcolm U. Pitt Field								
May 8	at Richmond		Malcolm U. Pitt Field								
May 13	George Washington		Spuhler Field								
May 14	George Washington		Spuhler Field								
May 15	George Washington		Spuhler Field								
May 19	at Davidson		T. Henry Wilson, Jr. Field; Davidson, NC								
May 20	at Davidson		T. Henry Wilson, Jr. Field								
May 21	at Davidson		T. Henry Wilson, Jr. Field								

Postseason

A10 Tournament
Date	Opponent	Seed	Site/stadium	Score	Win	Loss	Save	TV	Attendance	Overall record	A10T Record
May 24	vs. (4) Rhode Island	(5)	T. Henry Wilson, Jr. Field	**W** 7–3	**Gartland (3–1)**	Twitchell (1–5)	—	ESPN+	377	23–31	1–0
May 25	at (1) Davidson	(5)	T. Henry Wilson, Jr. Field	**L** 2–6	Devos (9–2)	**Peterson (4–3)**	Flynn (6)	ESPN+	455	23–32	1–1
May 26	vs. (7) Richmond	(5)	T. Henry Wilson, Jr. Field	**L** 3–7	Argomaniz (6–0)	**Shields (2–4)**	Willitts (2)	ESPN+	237	23–33	1–2

Legend: = Win = Loss = Canceled
* = Non-conference game Bold = GMU team member
Rankings are based on the team's current ranking in the D1Baseball poll.

== Tournaments ==
=== Atlantic 10 tournament ===
Atlantic 10 tournament teams
(1) Davidson Wildcats	(2) VCU Rams	(3) Saint Louis Billikens	(4) Rhode Island Rams	(5) George Mason Patriots	(6) Saint Joseph's Hawks	(7) Richmond Spiders

Upper round 1	Upper round 2	Upper final	Final
1	Davidson	6
5	George Mason	2
4	Rhode Island	3
5	George Mason	7
1	Davidson	6
2	VCU	14
3	Saint Louis	1
6	Saint Joseph's	2
2	VCU	8
6	Saint Joseph's	4
2	VCU	4
7	Richmond	3
2	VCU	10	—
7	Richmond	7	—
Lower round 1	Lower round 2	Lower round 3	Lower final
5	George Mason	3
4	Rhode Island	1	7	Richmond	7	1	Davidson	9
7	Richmond	4	7	Richmond	16	7	Richmond	12
3	Saint Louis	4
3	Saint Louis	10
6	Saint Joseph's	6

== Rankings ==
Ranking movements Legend: — = Not ranked
	Week																			
Poll	Pre	1	2	3	4	5	6	7	8	9	10	11	12	13	14	15	16	17	18	Final
Coaches'	—	—*	—	—	—	—	—	—	—	—	—	—	—	—	—					
Baseball America	—	—	—	—	—	—	—	—	—	—	—	—	—	—	—					
Collegiate Baseball^	—	—	—	—	—	—	—	—	—	—	—	—	—	—	—					
NCBWA†	—	—	—	—	—	—	—	—	—	—	—	—	—	—	—					
D1Baseball	—	—	—	—	—	—	—	—	—	—	—	—	—	—	—					

^ Collegiate Baseball ranked 40 teams in their preseason poll, but only ranked 30 teams weekly during the season.
† NCBWA ranks 30 teams in their preseason poll, but only ranks 25 teams weekly during the season.
* A new poll was not released for this week, so for comparison purposes, the previous week's ranking is inserted in this week's slot.
