= 2022 VCU Rams baseball team =

American college baseball season

2022 VCU Rams baseball

Atlantic 10 tournament champions

NCAA Chapel Hill Regional, 2–2
- Conference: Atlantic 10 Conference
- Record: 42–20 (19–5 A-10)
- Head coach: Shawn Stiffler (10th season)
- Assistant coaches: Rich Witten (5th season); Seth Cutler-Voltz (3rd season); Andrew Llewellyn (2nd season)
- MVP: Tyler Locklear
- Captains: Tyler Locklear; Logan Amiss; Cooper Benzin
- Home stadium: The Diamond

2022 Atlantic 10 Conference baseball standings
	Conf.						Overall
Team	W		L		T	PCT	W		L		T	PCT
Davidson ‍†‍‍	20	–	4	–	0	.833	43	–	13	–	0	.768
VCU ‍‍‡‍^{y}	19	–	5	–	0	.792	42	–	20	–	0	.677
Saint Louis ‍‍‍	14	–	9	–	0	.609	29	–	24	–	0	.547
Rhode Island ‍‍‍	14	–	10	–	0	.583	20	–	35	–	0	.364
George Mason ‍‍‍	13	–	11	–	0	.542	23	–	33	–	0	.411
Saint Joseph's ‍‍‍	12	–	11	–	0	.522	29	–	25	–	0	.537
Richmond ‍‍‍	11	–	13	–	0	.458	30	–	26	–	0	.536
Dayton ‍‍‍	10	–	14	–	0	.417	23	–	27	–	0	.460
George Washington ‍‍‍	10	–	14	–	0	.417	22	–	30	–	0	.423
Fordham ‍‍‍	9	–	15	–	0	.375	16	–	36	–	0	.308
UMass ‍‍‍	8	–	16	–	0	.333	22	–	26	–	1	.459
St. Bonaventure ‍‍‍	3	–	21	–	0	.125	6	–	39	–	0	.133
† – Conference champion ‡ – Tournament champion y – Invited to the NCAA tournament Rankings from D1Baseball

The 2022 VCU Rams baseball team represented Virginia Commonwealth University during the 2022 NCAA Division I baseball season. The Rams played their home games at The Diamond as a member of the Atlantic 10 Conference. They were led by head coach Shawn Stiffler, in his 10th season at VCU.

VCU earned their first 40-win season since 2015, and repeated as Atlantic 10 Tournament champions. The reached the Regional Final of the NCAA Chapel Hill Regional before losing to North Carolina in game 7.

== Previous season ==
The 2021 VCU Rams baseball team notched a 38–16 (13–3) regular season record. Due to ongoing issues associated with the COVID-19 pandemic, the Rams began their season on February 20, about a week later than usual, due to the pandemic. VCU won the 2021 Atlantic 10 Conference baseball tournament over Dayton, and qualified for the NCAA Division I baseball tournament for the first time since 2015. They were seeded number two in the Starkville Regional, their highest seeding since 2003. There, they defeated Campbell in the opening round, before losing to Mississippi State, the eventual National Champions, and Campbell for a second loss, causing their elimination.

Freshman Tyler Locklear won the Atlantic 10 Player and Rookie of the Year. Locklear earned a number of allocades including national recognition from ABCA, Baseball America, NCBWA, and Collegiate Baseball.

== Preseason ==
=== Award watch lists ===
Listed in the order that they were released

Award	Player	Position	Year
Golden Spikes Award	Tyler Locklear	INF	RS Sophomore

=== Coaches poll ===
The Atlantic 10 baseball coaches' poll was released on February 15, 2022. VCU was picked to finish first in the Atlantic 10.

Coaches' Poll
Predicted finish	Team	Points
1	VCU	143 (11)
2	Dayton	122 (1)
3	Rhode Island	101
4	Saint Louis	94
5	Davidson	91
6	Fordham	83
7	George Washington	80
8	Richmond	76
9	Saint Joseph's	73
10	George Mason	33
11	UMass	26
12	St. Bonaventure	14

=== Preseason Atlantic 10 awards and honors ===
Tyler Locklear was named the Atlantic 10 Preseason Player of the Year, while Locklear, Mason Delane, and Michael Haydak were named to the All-Atlantic 10 Preseason team.

A-10 Preseason Player of the Year
Player	No.	Position	Class
Tyler Locklear	28	3B	RS Sophomore

Preseason All-Atlantic 10 Team
Player	No.	Position	Class
Mason Delane	33	RHP	RS Sophomore
Michael Haydak	2	UTL	RS Junior
Tyler Locklear	28	3B	RS Sophomore

=== Preseason All-Americans ===
First Team All-Americans
Player	No.	Position	Class	Selector(s)
Tyler Locklear	28	3B	RS Sophomore	Collegiate Baseball; D1Baseball; Perfect Game

Second Team All-Americans
Player	No.	Position	Class	Selector(s)
Tyler Locklear	28	3B	RS Sophomore	NCBWA

== Personnel ==
=== Roster ===
2022 VCU Rams baseball team
Players
Coaches

#	Pos.	Name	B/T	Height	Weight	Year	Home town
1	INF	Marcus O'Malley	L/R	5 ft 9 in (1.75 m)	161 lb (73 kg)	Fr	Naples, FL
2	INF	Michael Haydak	R/R	5 ft 11 in (1.8 m)	190 lb (86 kg)	RS Jr	Tampa, FL
3	INF	Connor Hujsak	R/R	6 ft 2 in (1.88 m)	195 lb (88 kg)	So	Goffstown, NH
4	INF	Ryan Recio	R/R	6 ft 2 in (1.88 m)	184 lb (83 kg)	Fr	Boca Raton, FL
6	INF	Griffin Boone	R/R	6 ft 0 in (1.83 m)	180 lb (82 kg)	So	Montclair, VA
8	INF	Aaron Barber	S/R	5 ft 7 in (1.7 m)	190 lb (86 kg)	RS So	Seattle, WA
9	OF	Scottie O'Bryan	R/R	6 ft 0 in (1.83 m)	195 lb (88 kg)	RS So	Jamesville, NY
10	RHP	Edwin Serrano	R/R	5 ft 11 in (1.8 m)	165 lb (75 kg)	RS Sr	Haines City, FL
12	OF	Jesse Robinson	R/R	6 ft 2 in (1.88 m)	190 lb (86 kg)	Fr	Henrico, VA
13	OF	A. J. Mathis	L/L	5 ft 8 in (1.73 m)	165 lb (75 kg)	RS Jr	Tampa, FL
14	C	Brendan Roney	R/R	5 ft 10 in (1.78 m)	185 lb (84 kg)	RS Fr	Cudjoe Key, FL
15	C	Jacob Selden	L/R	6 ft 0 in (1.83 m)	175 lb (79 kg)	Gr	Charleston, SC
16	LHP	Joey Perkins	L/L	6 ft 3 in (1.91 m)	215 lb (98 kg)	RS Jr	Lebanon, OH
17	C	Casey Gibbs	S/R	6 ft 0 in (1.83 m)	170 lb (77 kg)	Fr	Olney, MD
18	RHP	Brendan Wilkinson	R/R	6 ft 1 in (1.85 m)	180 lb (82 kg)	Fr	Milton, ON
19	OF	John Lucas	R/R	6 ft 1 in (1.85 m)	130 lb (59 kg)	Fr	Midlothian, VA
20	LHP	Jaden Griffin	L/L	6 ft 0 in (1.83 m)	205 lb (93 kg)	RS Jr	Lower Sackville, NS
21	OF	Logan Amiss	L/R	5 ft 11 in (1.8 m)	205 lb (93 kg)	RS Jr	Powhatan, VA
22	RHP	Zach Boswell	R/R	5 ft 10 in (1.78 m)	185 lb (84 kg)	RS Jr	Snohomish, WA
23	RHP	Ethan Mishra	R/R	6 ft 3 in (1.91 m)	200 lb (91 kg)	Fr	Washington, DC
24	LHP	Maddison Furman	L/L	5 ft 9 in (1.75 m)	185 lb (84 kg)	RS Jr	Richmond, VA
25	LHP	Jack Masloff	L/L	6 ft 2 in (1.88 m)	185 lb (84 kg)	RS So	Charlottesville, VA
26	OF	Cooper Benzin	R/R	6 ft 3 in (1.91 m)	195 lb (88 kg)	RS So	Ashland, VA
27	RHP	Nick Frazier	R/R	5 ft 9 in (1.75 m)	170 lb (77 kg)	Fr	Vienna, VA
28	INF	Tyler Locklear	R/R	6 ft 3 in (1.91 m)	210 lb (95 kg)	RS So	Abingdon, MD
30	RHP	Virot Siharath	R/R	5 ft 10 in (1.78 m)	200 lb (91 kg)	Fr	Keswick, ON
32	OF	Devan Barnett	L/L	6 ft 5 in (1.96 m)	212 lb (96 kg)	So	Pittsburgh, PA
33	RHP	Mason Delane	R/R	6 ft 4 in (1.93 m)	205 lb (93 kg)	RS So	Colonial Beach, VA
34	INF	Ben Nippolt	L/R	5 ft 10 in (1.78 m)	165 lb (75 kg)	RS So	Saint Paul, MN
37	C	Nic Ericcson	R/R	6 ft 2 in (1.88 m)	200 lb (91 kg)	RS So	Woodbridge, VA
38	RHP	Nolan Wilson	R/R	6 ft 3 in (1.91 m)	215 lb (98 kg)	Gr	Atlanta, GA
39	RHP	Evan Chenier	R/R	6 ft 5 in (1.96 m)	215 lb (98 kg)	RS Jr	Georgetown, ON
40	INF	Will Carlone	R/R	6 ft 2 in (1.88 m)	205 lb (93 kg)	RS So	West Seneca, NY
41	INF	Chase Hungate	L/R	6 ft 0 in (1.83 m)	175 lb (79 kg)	Fr	Abingdon, VA
43	LHP	Cade Dressler	L/L	6 ft 2 in (1.88 m)	225 lb (102 kg)	Fr	Mifflinburg, PA
44	C	Tyler Coy	R/R	6 ft 3 in (1.91 m)	230 lb (104 kg)	So	Williamsville, NY
45	LHP	Tyler Davis	L/L	6 ft 2 in (1.88 m)	210 lb (95 kg)	So	Newport News, VA
46	LHP	Campbell Ellis	L/L	6 ft 4 in (1.93 m)	200 lb (91 kg)	So	Georgetown, ON
50	RHP	Justin Humenay	R/R	6 ft 0 in (1.83 m)	195 lb (88 kg)	So	Montreal, QC
55	RHP	Braedin Hunt	R/R	6 ft 2 in (1.88 m)	210 lb (95 kg)	RS Fr	Old Bridge, NJ

Head coach

Shawn Stiffler

Assistant coach(es)

Rich Witten
Seth Cutler-Voltz
Andrew Llewellyn

Legend

- (C) Team captain
- (S) Suspended
- (I) Ineligible
- Injured
- Current redshirt

Roster
Last update: January 27, 2022

=== Coaching staff ===
2022 VCU Rams baseball coaching staff
Name	Position	Seasons at VCU	Alma mater
Shawn Stiffler	Head coach	10	George Mason University (2001)
Rich Witten	Assistant Coach	5	Coastal Carolina University (2012)
Seth Cutler-Voltz	Assistant Coach	3	Virginia Commonwealth University (2012)
Andrew Llewellyn	Assistant Coach	2	Wingate University (2020)

== Offseason ==
=== Departures ===
VCU Departures
Name	Number	Pos.	Height	Weight	Year	Hometown	Notes
Steven Carpenter	1	INF	5 ft 11 in (1.80 m)	185	Sr.	Quinton, Virginia,	Graduated
Hogan Brown	8	UTL	6 ft 2 in (1.88 m)	200	Jr.	Virginia Beach, Virginia,	Did not return
Nick Evangelista	9	RHP	5 ft 11 in (1.80 m)	205	Jr.	Sewell, New Jersey,	Transferred to Fairleigh Dickinson
Brandon Henson	12	OF	5 ft 11 in (1.80 m)	185	Sr.	Reynoldsburg, Ohio,	Graduated
Greg Ryan	13	INF	6 ft 1 in (1.85 m)	200	So.	Richmond, Virginia,	Transferred to Longwood
Josh Simon	17	C	6 ft 0 in (1.83 m)	195	Sr.	Laurel, Maryland	Graduated
Andrew Puglielli	22	INF	5 ft 11 in (1.80 m)	190	Sr.	Naples, Florida,	Graduated
Michael Dailey	30	RHP	5 ft 11 in (1.80 m)	170	Sr.	Troy, Virginia,	Graduated
Bradford Webb	34	RHP	6 ft 3 in (1.91 m)	200	Gr.	Charlotte Court House, Virginia,	Drafted by Texas Rangers
Danny Watson	38	RHP	6 ft 7 in (2.01 m)	235	So.	Nassau, New York,	Drafted by New York Yankees

=== Transfers ===
Incoming transfers
Name	Number	Pos.	Height	Weight	Year	Hometown	Previous School
Michael Haydak	2	INF	5 ft 11 in (1.80 m)	190	RS-Jr.	Tampa, Florida,	Pasco-Hernando State
Aaron Barber	8	INF	5 ft 7 in (1.70 m)	190	RS-So.	Seattle, Washington	Everett CC
Scottie O'Bryan	9	OF	6 ft 0 in (1.83 m)	195	RS-So.	Jamesville, New York,	Niagara County CC
Edwin Serrano	10	RHP	5 ft 11 in (1.80 m)	165	RS-Sr.	Haines City, Florida,	South Florida State
AJ Mathis	13	OF	5 ft 8 in (1.73 m)	165	RS-Jr.	Tampa, Florida,	Eastern Florida State
Brendan Roney	14	C	5 ft 10 in (1.78 m)	185	RS-Fr.	Cudjoe Key, Florida,	Boston College
Jacob Selden	15	C	6 ft 0 in (1.83 m)	175	Gr.	Charleston, South Carolina,	Randolph–Macon
Joey Perkins	16	LHP	6 ft 3 in (1.91 m)	215	RS-Jr.	Lebanon, Ohio,	Lincoln Trail College
Zach Boswell	22	RHP	5 ft 10 in (1.78 m)	185	RS-Jr.	Snohomish, Washington	Everett CC
Ben Nippolt	34	INF	5 ft 10 in (1.78 m)	165	RS-So.	St. Paul, Minnesota,	Des Moines Area CC
Nolan Wilson	38	RHP	6 ft 3 in (1.91 m)	215	Gr.	Atlanta, Georgia,	Virginia Tech

=== Signing Day Recruits ===
The following players signed National Letter of Intents to play for VCU in 2022.

Player	Hometown	High School
Pitchers
Cade Dressler	Mifflinburg, Pennsylvania	Mifflingburg Area
Nick Frazier	Vienna, Virginia,	Bishop O'Connell
Chase Hungate	Abingdon, Virginia,	Abingdon (VA)
Ethan Mishra	Washington, D.C.	St. John's College
Virot Siharath	Keswick, Ontario	Crothers
Brendan Wilkinson	Milton, Ontario	Kielburger
Hitters
Casey Gibbs	Olney, Maryland	St. John's College
John Lucas	Midlothian, Virginia,	Trinity Episcopal (VA)
Marcus O'Malley	Naples, Florida,	Collier
Ryan Recio	Boca Raton, Florida,	Boca Raton Community
Jesse Robinson	Henrico, Virginia,	Deep Run

=== 2021 MLB draft ===
Round	Pick	Player	Position	MLB Team
#7	#194	Bradford Webb	RHP	Texas Rangers
#15	#453	Danny Watson	RHP	New York Yankees

== Game log ==
2022 VCU Rams baseball game log (42–20)
Regular season (36–18)

February (2–4)
Date	Time (ET)	TV	Opponent	Rank	Stadium	Score	Win	Loss	Save	Attendance	Overall	Atlantic 10	Sources
Winston-Salem Series
February 18	2:00 p.m.		vs. Rider*		Ernie Shore Field; Winston-Salem, NC	L 6–7	Kirwin (1–0)	Davis (0–1)	Stalzer (1)	64	0–1	—	Box Score; Recap
February 19	10:00 a.m.		vs. Lafayette*		Ernie Shore Field	W 13–3	Hungate (1–0)	Morr (0–1)	Delane (1)	103	1–1	—	Box Score; Recap
February 20	4:00 p.m.	ACCNX	at Wake Forest*		Ernie Shore Field	L 4–6	McGraw (1–0)	Griffin (0–1)	Alder (1)	841	1–2	—	Box Score; Recap
February 22	5:00 p.m.	ESPN+	at Longwood*		Bolding Stadium; Farmville, VA	W 8–3	Davis (1–0)	Gunn (0–1)	—	312	2–2	—	Box Score; Recap
February 25	4:00 p.m.	SECN+	at No. 3 Ole Miss*		Swayze Field; Oxford, MS	L 4–10	Diamond (1–0)	Masloff (0–1)	—	9,209	2–3	—	Box Score; Recap
February 26	12:00 p.m.	SECN+	at No. 3 Ole Miss*		Swayze Field	Canceled (inclement weather)							Report
February 27	12:00 p.m.	SECN+	at No. 3 Ole Miss*		Swayze Field	L 3–14^{7}	McDaniel (2–0)	Ellis (0–1)	—	8,926	2–4	—	Box Score; Recap

March (11–6)
Date	Time (ET)	TV	Opponent	Rank	Stadium	Score	Win	Loss	Save	Attendance	Overall	Atlantic 10	Sources
March 1	3:00 p.m.	ESPN+	No. 24 Old Dominion*		The Diamond; Richmond, VA	L 1–3	Gomez (1–0)	Hungate (1–1)	Dean (2)	456	2–5	—	Box Score; Recap
Central Virginia Classic
March 4	3:00 p.m.	ESPN+	Lafayette*		The Diamond	L 0–3	Benneche (1–2)	Ellis (0–2)	Yoder (1)	299	2–6	—	Box Score; Recap
March 5	2:00 p.m.	ESPN+	Princeton*		The Diamond	W 2–1	Wilson (1–0)	Rabin (0–2)	—	527	3–6	—	Box Score; Recap
March 6	1:00 p.m.	ESPN+	Rutgers*		The Diamond	L 0–8	Florence (2–0)	Davis (1–2)	—	532	3–7	—	Box Score; Recap
March 8	4:00 p.m.	BTN+	at No. 22 Maryland*		Turtle Smith Stadium; College Park, MD	L 6–8	Orlando (1–0)	Serrano (0–1)	Glock (1)	627	3–8	—	Box Score; Recap
March 9	3:00 p.m.	ESPN+	No. 22 Maryland		The Diamond	Postponed (inclement weather), makeup date TBD							Report
March 11	3:00 p.m.		North Carolina A&T*		The Diamond	W 9–6	Griffin (1–1)	Jarosz (1–2)	Wilson (1)	340	4–8	—	Box Score; Recap
March 12	2:00 p.m.		Monmouth*		The Diamond	W 4–2	Hungate (2–1)	Barker (0–1)	Serrano (1)	287	5–8	—	Box Score; Report
March 13	1:00 p.m.		Monmouth*		The Diamond	W 3–0	Furman (1–0)	Hensey (0–3)	Masloff (1)	311	6–8	—	Box Score; Report
March 15	3:00 p.m.		No. 12 Liberty*		The Diamond	W 2–1	Nolan (2–0)	Fluharty (2–1)	—	424	7–8	—	Box Score; Recap
March 18	6:00 p.m.		Quinnipiac*		The Diamond	W 8–2	Hungate (3–1)	Garcia (2–3)	Serrano (2)	437	8–8	—	Box Score; Recap
March 19	2:00 p.m.		Quinnipiac*		The Diamond	W 14–4	Griffin (2–1)	Seitter (0–3)	—	453	9–8	—	Box Score; Recap
March 20	1:00 p.m.		Quinnipiac*		The Diamond	W 17–6	Masloff (1–1)	Copeland (0–2)	—	389	10–8	—	Box Score; Recap
March 22	6:30 p.m.		Longwood*		The Diamond	W 6–5	Serrano (1–1)	Karlinchak (0–2)	—	565	11–8	—	Box Score; Recap
March 23	3:00 p.m.		at Norfolk State*		Marty L. Miller Field; Norfolk, VA	3–3^{3}	Postponed (inclement weather)						Report
March 25	6:30 p.m.	ESPN+	at East Carolina*		Clark–LeClair Stadium; Greenville, NC	L 2–8	Kuchmaner (3–1)	Ellis (0–3)	Yesavage (1)	3,362	11–9	—	Box Score; Recap
March 26	4:00 p.m.	ESPN+	at East Carolina*		Clark–LeClair Stadium	L 5–7	Giles (1–0)	Delane (0–1)	—	4,752	11–10	—	Box Score; Recap
March 27	1:00 p.m.	ESPN+	at East Carolina*		Clark–LeClair Stadium	W 5–2	Griffin (3–1)	Saylor (2–3)	Serrano (3)	2,676	12–10	—	Box Score; Recap
March 29	6:30 p.m.	FloBaseball	at William & Mary*		Plumeri Park; Williamsburg, VA	W 4–2	Ellis (1–3)	Knowles (1–2)	Wilson (2)	194	13–10	—	Box Score; Recap

April (11–7)
Date	Time (ET)	TV	Opponent	Rank	Stadium	Score	Win	Loss	Save	Attendance	Overall	Atlantic 10	Sources
April 1	3:00 p.m.	ESPN+	at George Mason		Spuhler Field; Fairfax, VA	L 6–7	Lyons (3–3)	Hungate (3–2)	Gartland (2)	133	13–11	0–1	Box Score; Recap
April 2	3:00 p.m.	ESPN+	at George Mason		Spuhler Field	W 9–2	Tyler (2–2)	Shields (0–2)	—	226	14–11	1–1	Box Score; Recap
April 3	2:00 p.m.	ESPN+	at George Mason		Spuhler Field	W 15–5	Masloff (2–1)	Posey (0–2)	—	207	15–11	2–1	Box Score; Recap
April 5	6:30 p.m.	ESPN+	VMI*		The Diamond	L 1–4	Lopez (1–1)	Serrano (1–2)	—	668	15–12	—	Box Score; Recap
April 8	6:30 p.m.	ESPN+	Davidson		The Diamond	W 7–6	Wilson (3–0)	Fenton (3–2)	—	394	16–12	3–1	Box Score; Recap
April 9	2:00 p.m.	ESPN+	Davidson		The Diamond	L 2–7	Hely (4–0)	Dressler (0–1)	—	634	16–13	3–2	Box Score; Recap
April 10	1:00 p.m.	ESPN+	Davidson		The Diamond	L 2–7	Feczko (7–0)	Hungate (3–3)	—	557	16–14	3–3	Box Score; Recap
April 12	6:30 p.m.	ESPN+	at VMI*		Gray–Minor Stadium; Lexington, VA	W 6–4	Masloff (3–1)	Inskeep (0–2)	—	143	17–14	—	Box Score; Recap
April 15	3:00 p.m.	ESPN+	at Richmond		Malcolm U. Pitt Field; Tuckahoe, VA	L 0–7	Weirather (4–2)	Hungate (3–4)	—	555	17–15	3–4	Box Score; Recap
April 16	2:00 p.m.	ESPN+	at Richmond		Malcolm U. Pitt Field	W 13–11	Chenier (1–0)	Allen (0–1)	—	487	18–15	4–4	Box Score; Recap
April 17	1:00 p.m.	ESPN+	at Richmond		Malcolm U. Pitt Field	W 13–2	Davis (3–2)	Larson (0–1)	—	430	19–15	5–4	Box Score; Recap
Duel at the Diamond
April 19	7:00 p.m.	ESPN+	No. 6 Virginia*		The Diamond	W 9–7^{10}	Wilson (4–0)	Hodorovich (0–1)	—	3,392	20–15	—	Box Score; Recap
April 22	6:30 p.m.	ESPN+	Saint Joseph's		The Diamond	W 7–2	Furman (2–0)	McCole (1–4)	—	945	21–15	6–4	Box Score; Recap
April 23	2:00 p.m.	ESPN+	Saint Joseph's		The Diamond	W 13–9	Davis (4–2)	Smith (4–3)	—	725	22–15	7–4	Box Score; Recap
April 24	1:00 p.m.	ESPN+	Saint Joseph's		The Diamond	L 3–6	Falco (6–2)	Ellis (1–4)	Devine (3)	711	22–16	7–5	Box Score; Recap
April 26	6:00 p.m.		William & Mary*		The Diamond	L 6–11	Lovasz (2–1)	Serrano (1–3)	—	338	22–17	—	Box Score; Recap
April 29	3:00 p.m.	ESPN+	at Dayton		Day Air Ballpark; Dayton, OH	W 7–0	Hungate (4–4)	Steinhauer (3–4)	—	2,500	23–17	8–5	Box Score; Recap
April 30	1:00 p.m.	ESPN+	at Dayton		Woerner Field; Dayton, OH	W 6–4	Masloff (4–1)	Majick (4–2)	—	77	24–17	9–5	Box Score; Recap

May (12–1)
Date	Time (ET)	TV	Opponent	Rank	Stadium	Score	Win	Loss	Save	Attendance	Overall	Atlantic 10	Sources
May 1	12:00 p.m.	ESPN+	at Dayton		Woerner Field	W 9–8	Furman (3–0)	Serwa (2–5)	—	87	25–17	10–5	Box Score; Recap
May 3	6:00 p.m.	ACCNX	at No. 12 Virginia*		Davenport Field; Charlottesville, VA	L 6–12	Kosanovich (3–0)	Serrano (1–4)	—	2,549	25–18	—	Box Score; Recap
May 7	10:00 a.m.	ESPN+	George Washington		The Diamond	W 5–1	Ellis (2–4)	Cohen (6–6)	—	319	26–18	11–5	Box Score; Recap
May 7	1:15 p.m.	ESPN+	George Washington		The Diamond	W 11–3	Delan (1–1)	Harris (2–7)	Masloff (2)	385	27–18	12–5	Box Score; Recap
May 8	6:05 p.m.	ESPN+	George Washington		The Diamond	W 7–2	Humenay (1–0)	Solt (3–4)	Griffin (1)	337	28–18	13–5	Box Score; Recap
May 10	6:00 p.m.	CUSA.tv	at No. 24 Old Dominion*		Bud Metheny Baseball Complex; Norfolk, VA	W 8–2	Frazier (1–0)	Nielsen (0–2)	Serrano (4)	274	29–18	—	Box Score; Recap
May 13	3:00 p.m.	ESPN+	at UMass		Earl Lorden Field; Amherst, MA	W 26–2	Ellis (3–4)	Dow (6–4)	—	85	30–18	14–5	Box Score; Recap
May 14	3:00 p.m.	ESPN+	at UMass		Earl Lorden Field	W 18–3	Furman (4–0)	LeSieur (4–1)	—	90	31–18	15–5	Box Score; Recap
May 15	12:00 p.m.	ESPN+	at UMass		Earl Lorden Field	W 6–1	Delane (2–1)	Clevenger (1–3)	Masloff (3)	90	32–18	16–5	Box Score; Recap
May 17	6:30 p.m.	ESPN+	Georgetown*		The Diamond	W 4–3^{12}	Frazier (2–0)	Keough (2–2)	—	385	33–18	—	Box Score; Recap
May 19	6:30 p.m.	ESPN+	Fordham		The Diamond	W 17–1	Ellis (4–4)	Knox (3–4)	—	369	34–18	17–5	Box Score; Recap
May 20	6:30 p.m.	ESPN+	Fordham		The Diamond	W 4–2	Furman (5–0)	Karslo (3–5)	Masloff (4)	396	35–18	18–5	Box Score; Recap
May 21	2:00 p.m.	ESPN+	Fordham		The Diamond	W 12–5	Humenay (2–0)	Sahler (2–3)	—	425	36–18	19–5	Box Score; Recap

Postseason (6–2)

Atlantic 10 Tournament (4–0)
Date	Time (ET)	TV	Opponent	Rank	Stadium	Score	Win	Loss	Save	Attendance	Overall	A10T Record	Sources
May 24	7:00 p.m.	ESPN+	vs. (7) Richmond; First round	(2)	Wilson Field; Davidson, NC	W 4–3	Hungate (5–4)	Weirather (6–5)	—	291	37–18	1–0	Box Score; Recap
May 25	3:30 p.m.	ESPN+	vs. (6) Saint Joseph's; Quarterfinals	(2)	Wilson Field	W 8–4	Furman (6–0)	McCole (3–6)	—	394	38–18	2–0	Box Score; Recap
May 27	12:00 p.m.	ESPN+	at (1) Davidson; Semifinals	(2)	Wilson Field	W 14–6	Chenier (2–0)	Hely (9–2)	—	825	39–18	3–0	Box Score; Recap
May 28	12:00 p.m.	ESPN+	vs. (7) Richmond; Finals – Game 1	(2)	Wilson Field	W 10–7	Hungate (6–4)	Balducci (1–1)	Masloff (5)	455	40–18	4–0	Box Score; Recap

NCAA Chapel Hill Regional (2–2)
Date	Time (ET)	TV	Opponent	Rank	Stadium	Score	Win	Loss	Save	Attendance	Overall	NCAAT Record	Sources
June 3	7:00 p.m.	ESPN+	vs. (2) Georgia; Game 2	(3)	Boshamer Stadium; Chapel Hill, NC	W 8–1	Davis (5–2)	Cannon (9–3)	—	2,930	41–18	1–0	Box Score; Recap
June 4	7:00 p.m.	ESPN+	at No. 10 (1) North Carolina; Game 4	(3)	Boshamer Stadium	W 4–3	Ellis (5–4)	Schaeffer (7–3)	Wilson (3)	3,843	42–18	2–0	Box Score; Recap
June 5	6:00 p.m.	ACCN	at No. 10 (1) North Carolina; Game 6	(3)	Boshamer Stadium	L 8–19	O'Brien (3–0)	Furman (6–1)	Bovair (1)	3,626	42–19	2–1	Box Score; Recap
June 6	6:00 p.m.	ACCN	at No. 10 (1) North Carolina; Game 7	(3)	Boshamer Stadium	L 3–7	Gillian (3–3)	Davis (5–3)	—	4,160	42–20	2–2	Box Score; Recap

Legend: = Win = Loss = Canceled
Bold =VCU team member
Rankings are based on the team's current ranking in the D1Baseball poll.

== Tournaments ==
=== Atlantic 10 tournament ===
Atlantic 10 tournament teams
(1) Davidson Wildcats	(2) VCU Rams	(3) Saint Louis Billikens	(4) Rhode Island Rams	(5) George Mason Patriots	(6) Saint Joseph's Hawks	(7) Richmond Spiders

Upper round 1	Upper round 2	Upper final	Final
1	Davidson	6
5	George Mason	2
4	Rhode Island	3
5	George Mason	7
1	Davidson	6
2	VCU	14
3	Saint Louis	1
6	Saint Joseph's	2
2	VCU	8
6	Saint Joseph's	4
2	VCU	4
7	Richmond	3
2	VCU	10	—
7	Richmond	7	—
Lower round 1	Lower round 2	Lower round 3	Lower final
5	George Mason	3
4	Rhode Island	1	7	Richmond	7	1	Davidson	9
7	Richmond	4	7	Richmond	16	7	Richmond	12
3	Saint Louis	4
3	Saint Louis	10
6	Saint Joseph's	6

First Round (Game 3)
(7) Richmond Spiders	vs.	(2) VCU Rams

May 24, 2022 7:02 pm (EDT) at T. Henry Wilson, Jr. Field in Davidson, North Carolina
Team	1	2	3	4	5	6	7	8	9	R	H	E
(7) Richmond	0	0	0	0	0	0	0	0	3	3	6	2
(2) VCU	0	0	0	0	2	0	2	0	X	4	9	2
WP: Chase Hungate (5–4) LP: Brock Weirather (6–5); Home runs: UR: None; VCU: None; Attendance: 291

|

Second Round (Game 5)
(2) VCU Rams	vs.	(6) Saint Joseph's Hawks

May 25, 2022 3:30 pm (EDT) at T. Henry Wilson, Jr. Field in Davidson, North Carolina
Team	1	2	3	4	5	6	7	8	9	R	H	E
(2) VCU	1	0	0	5	0	0	0	2	0	8	11	2
(6) Saint Joseph's	0	0	0	0	0	1	1	2	0	4	8	0
WP: Maddison Furman (6–0) LP: Ian McCole (3–6); Home runs: VCU: Tyler Locklear, Connor Hujsak, Ben Nippolt; STJ: Nate Thomas; Attendance: 394

|}

Semifinal (Game 10)
(1) Davidson Wildcats	vs.	(2) VCU Rams

May 27, 2022 3:57 pm (EDT) at T. Henry Wilson, Jr. Field in Davidson, North Carolina
Team	1	2	3	4	5	6	7	8	9	R	H	E
(1) Davidson	0	0	0	0	0	0	3	2	1	6	12	3
(2) VCU	0	0	3	1	3	1	2	4	X	14	14	0
WP: Evan Chenier (2–0) LP: Blake Hely (9–2); Home runs: DAV: Michael Carico, Jacob Hinderleider; VCU: Tyler Locklear, Jacob Selden, Will Carlone; Attendance: 825

|

Final (Game 12)
(2) VCU Rams	vs.	(7) Richmond Spiders

May 28, 2022 3:30 pm (EDT) at T. Henry Wilson, Jr. Field in Davidson, North Carolina
Team	1	2	3	4	5	6	7	8	9	R	H	E
(2) VCU	2	0	4	0	0	3	0	0	1	10	13	1
(7) Richmond	0	3	1	2	0	0	1	0	0	7	13	1
WP: Chase Hungate (6–4) LP: Antonio Balducci (1–1) Sv: Jack Masloff (5); Home runs: VCU: Tyler Locklear; UR: None; Attendance: 455

|}

=== NCAA Chapel Hill Regional ===
Chapel Hill Regional Teams
(1) North Carolina Tar Heels	(2) Georgia Bulldogs	(3) VCU Rams	(4) Hofstra Pride

First round
1	North Carolina	15
4	Hofstra	4
3	VCU	8
2	Georgia	1
Lower round 1
4	Hofstra	1
2	Georgia	24

Semi-finals
1	North Carolina	3
3	VCU	4
Lower final
1	North Carolina	6
2	Georgia	5

Finals
3	VCU	8	3
1	North Carolina	19	7

First Round (Game 2)
(3) VCU Rams	vs.	(2) Georgia Bulldogs

May 24, 2022 7:02 pm (EDT) at T. Henry Wilson, Jr. Field in Davidson, North Carolina
Team	1	2	3	4	5	6	7	8	9	R	H	E
(3) VCU	0	0	0	0	0	0	0	0	3	3	6	2
(2) Georgia	0	0	0	0	2	0	2	0	X	4	9	2
WP: Chase Hungate (5–4) LP: Brock Weirather (6–5); Home runs: VCU: None; UGA: None; Attendance: 291

|

Semifinals (Game 4)
(1) North Carolina Tar Heels	vs.	(2) VCU Rams

May 25, 2022 3:30 pm (EDT) at T. Henry Wilson, Jr. Field in Davidson, North Carolina
Team	1	2	3	4	5	6	7	8	9	R	H	E
(1) North Carolina	1	0	0	5	0	0	0	2	0	8	11	2
(3) VCU	0	0	0	0	0	1	1	2	0	4	8	0
WP: Maddison Furman (6–0) LP: Ian McCole (3–6); Home runs: UNC: Tyler Locklear, Connor Hujsak, Ben Nippolt; VCU: Nate Thomas; Attendance: 394

|}

Final – Game 1 (Game 6)
(3) VCU Rams	vs.	(1) North Carolina Tar Heels

May 27, 2022 3:57 pm (EDT) at T. Henry Wilson, Jr. Field in Davidson, North Carolina
Team	1	2	3	4	5	6	7	8	9	R	H	E
(1) Davidson	0	0	0	0	0	0	3	2	1	6	12	3
(2) VCU	0	0	3	1	3	1	2	4	X	14	14	0
WP: Evan Chenier (2–0) LP: Blake Hely (9–2); Home runs: DAV: Michael Carico, Jacob Hinderleider; VCU: Tyler Locklear, Jacob Selden, Will Carlone; Attendance: 825

|

Final – Game 2 (Game 7)
(2) VCU Rams	vs.	(7) Richmond Spiders

May 28, 2022 3:30 pm (EDT) at T. Henry Wilson, Jr. Field in Davidson, North Carolina
Team	1	2	3	4	5	6	7	8	9	R	H	E
(2) VCU	2	0	4	0	0	3	0	0	1	10	13	1
(7) Richmond	0	3	1	2	0	0	1	0	0	7	13	1
WP: Chase Hungate (6–4) LP: Antonio Balducci (1–1) Sv: Jack Masloff (5); Home runs: VCU: Tyler Locklear; UR: None; Attendance: 455

|}

== Statistics ==
Statistics current through May 20, 2022.

=== Team batting ===
Team	AB	Avg.	H	2B	3B	HR	RBI	SLG	BB	SO
VCU	1814	.304	552	133	14	78	417	.522	305	463
Opponents	1710	.217	371	79	5	39	186	.337	194	509

=== Team pitching ===
Team	IP	H	R	ER	BB	SO	SV	ERA
VCU'	463.2	371	215	186	194	509	15	3.61
Opponents	441.0	552	450	411	305	463	6	8.39

=== Individual batting ===
Note: leaders must meet the minimum requirement of 2 PA/G and 75% of games played

Player	GP	AB	Avg.	H	2B	3B	HR	RBI	BB	SO	SB

=== Individual pitching ===
Note: leaders must meet the minimum requirement of 1 IP/G

Player	GP	GS	W	L	IP	H	R	ER	BB	SO	SV	ERA

Legend
GP	Games played	GS	Games started	AB	At-bats
H	Hits	Avg.	Batting average	2B	Doubles
3B	Triples	HR	Home runs	RBI	Runs batted in
IP	Innings pitched	W	Wins	L	Losses
ERA	Earned run average	SO	Strikeouts	BB	Base on balls
SV	Saves	SB	Stolen bases	High	Team high

== Awards and honors ==
Weekly honors
Honors	Player	Position	Date awarded	Ref.
Atlantic 10 Pitcher of the Week	Campbell Ellis	LHP	May 9, 2022	
Atlantic 10 Player of the Week	Tyler Locklear	3B	May 16, 2022	

Monthly honors
Honors	Player	Position	Date awarded	Ref.

== Rankings ==
Ranking movements Legend: ██ Increase in ranking ██ Decrease in ranking — = Not ranked RV = Received votes
	Week																			
Poll	Pre	1	2	3	4	5	6	7	8	9	10	11	12	13	14	15	16	17	18	Final
Coaches'	RV	RV*	—	—	—	—	—	—	—	—	—	—	—	—	—	RV	RV	RV	RV	RV
Baseball America	—	—	—	—	—	—	—	—	—	—	—	—	—	—	—	—	RV	RV	RV	RV
Collegiate Baseball^	RV	—	—	—	—	—	—	—	—	—	—	—	—	—	RV	RV	RV	RV	RV	RV
NCBWA†	—	—	—	—	—	—	—	—	—	—	—	—	—	—	—	RV	RV	RV	RV	RV
D1Baseball	—	—	—	—	—	—	—	—	—	—	—	—	—	—	—	—	RV	RV	RV	RV

^ Collegiate Baseball ranked 40 teams in their preseason poll, but only ranked 30 teams weekly during the season.
† NCBWA ranks 30 teams in their preseason poll, but only ranks 25 teams weekly during the season.
* A new poll was not released for this week, so for comparison purposes, the previous week's ranking is inserted in this week's slot.
