= Davidson Wildcats baseball statistical leaders =

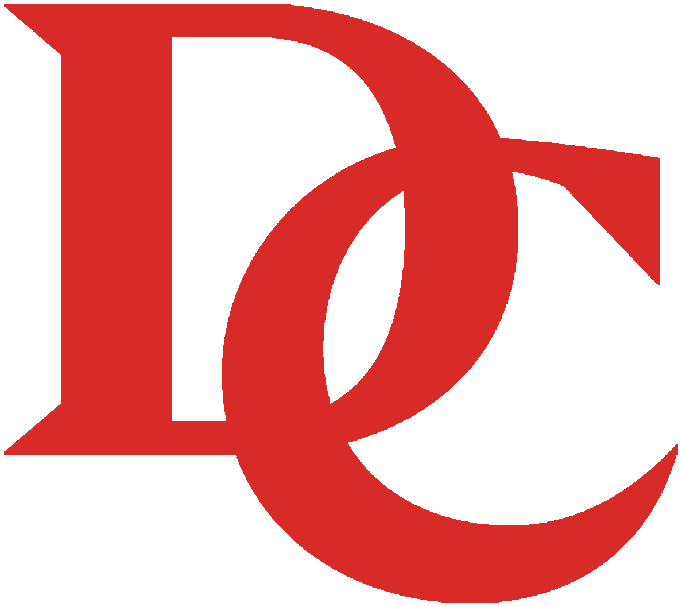

The Davidson Wildcats baseball statistical leaders are individual statistical leaders of the Davidson Wildcats baseball program in various categories, including batting average, home runs, runs batted in, runs, hits, stolen bases, ERA, and Strikeouts. Within those areas, the lists identify single-game, single-season, and career leaders. The Wildcats represent Davidson College in the NCAA's Atlantic 10 Conference.

Davidson began competing in intercollegiate baseball in 1902. These lists are updated through the end of the 2025 season.

== Batting Average ==
Career
Rk	Player	AVG	Seasons
1	Billy Masse	.383	1985 1986 1987
2	Gordon Slade	.381	1968 1969 1970
3	Allen Griffin	.378	1979 1980 1981 1982
4	Dave Turgeon	.366	1984 1985 1986 1987
5	George Weicker	.358	1972 1973 1974 1975
6	Alan Lewis	.357	1985 1986 1987
7	Cider Canon	.350	2024 2025
8	Tim Frend	.346	1999 2000 2001 2002
9	John Porter	.343	1978 1979 1980 1981
10	Eli Putnam	.338	2022 2023 2024 2025

Season
Rk	Player	AVG	Season
1	Jim West	.459	1957
2	Jay Heafner	.448	2005
	George Weicker	.448	1975
4	Buzzy Hope	.432	1955
5	Billy Masse	.430	1985
6	Gordon Slade	.429	1968
7	Allen Griffin	.422	1982
8	Billy Morris	.419	1956
9	Allen Griffin	.417	1981
10	Alan Lewis	.410	1986
	Stephen Aldrich	.410	2001

== Home Runs ==
Career
Rk	Player	HR	Seasons
1	Dave Turgeon	38	1984 1985 1986 1987
2	Gus Quattlebaum	35	1994 1995 1996 1997
	Eli Putnam	35	2022 2023 2024 2025
	Michael O'Shaughnessy	35	2023 2024 2025
5	Billy Masse	34	1985 1986 1987
	Tim Frend	34	1999 2000 2001 2002
	Gregory Zage	34	2004 2005 2006 2007
8	Rick Bender	33	1990 1991 1992 1993
	Brett Boretti	33	1991 1992 1993 1994
10	Brad Edwards	32	1994 1995 1996 1997

Season
Rk	Player	HR	Season
1	Michael Carico	21	2022
2	Eli Putnam	19	2025
3	Will Robertson	18	2017
4	Tim Kerns	17	1993
	Ryan Wilson	17	2023
	Cider Canon	17	2025
	Michael O'Shaughnessy	17	2025
8	Eli Putnam	16	2024
9	Brian Fortier	15	2017
	Dave Turgeon	15	1987
	Parker Nolan	15	2022

Single Game
Rk	Player	HR	Season	Opponent
1	Gus Quattlebaum	4	1997	VCU
	Drew Gadaire	4	2009	Gardner-Webb
	Cider Canon	4	2025	Saint Joseph's

== Runs Batted In ==
Career
Rk	Player	RBI	Seasons
1	Dave Turgeon	182	1984 1985 1986 1987
2	Tim Frend	176	1999 2000 2001 2002
3	Brad Edwards	173	1994 1995 1996 1997
4	Michael O'Shaughnessy	155	2023 2024 2025
5	Lee Miller	149	2013 2014 2015 2016
6	Alan Lewis	145	1985 1986 1987
7	Brett Boretti	144	1991 1992 1993 1994
8	Andrew Barna	143	2010 2011 2012 2013
9	Eric Jones	142	2016 2017 2018 2019
10	Jay Heafner	141	2003 2004 2005 2006

Season
Rk	Player	RBI	Season
1	Michael O'Shaughnessy	70	2025
2	Trevor Candelaria	62	2022
	Eli Putnam	62	2025
4	Alan Lewis	61	1985
	Tim Kerns	61	1993
6	Eric Jones	60	2018
7	Brad Edwards	59	1997
8	Jay Heafner	58	2005
	Eli Putnam	58	2024
10	Michael Carico	57	2022

Single Game
Rk	Player	RBI	Season	Opponent
1	Gus Quattlebaum	10	1997	VCU

== Runs ==
Career
Rk	Player	R	Seasons
1	Billy Masse	189	1985 1986 1987
2	Tim Frend	181	1999 2000 2001 2002
3	Rick Bender	176	1990 1991 1992 1993
4	Ryan Wilson	163	2021 2022 2023
5	Gus Quattlebaum	160	1994 1995 1996 1997
6	Jay Heafner	154	2003 2004 2005 2006
7	Ben Brown	153	1997 1998 1999 2000
8	Dave Turgeon	145	1984 1985 1986 1987
9	Jazz Freitas	144	1991 1992 1993 1994
10	Forrest Brandt	140	2011 2012 2013 2014
	Eric Jones	140	2016 2017 2018 2019

Season
Rk	Player	R	Season
1	Eli Putnam	72	2025
2	Michael Carico	71	2022
3	Ryan Wilson	70	2023
4	Cider Canon	65	2025
5	Billy Masse	64	1987
6	Billy Masse	63	1986
	Ryan Wilson	63	2022
8	Billy Masse	62	1985
	Trevor Candelaria	62	2022
10	Will Robertson	61	2017

Single Game
Rk	Player	R	Season	Opponent
1	Many Times	5	Most recent: Anthony Torreso, 2026 vs. La Salle	

== Hits ==
Career
Rk	Player	H	Seasons
1	Tim Frend	272	1999 2000 2001 2002
2	Jay Heafner	250	2003 2004 2005 2006
3	Eric Jones	247	2016 2017 2018 2019
4	Drew Gadaire	244	2009 2010 2011 2012
5	Rick Bender	237	1990 1991 1992 1993
	Alec Acosta	237	2015 2016 2017 2018
7	Ben Brown	234	1997 1998 1999 2000
8	Forrest Brandt	231	2011 2012 2013 2014
9	Sam Foy	228	2013 2014 2015 2016
10	Dave Turgeon	227	1984 1985 1986 1987

Season
Rk	Player	H	Season
1	Jay Heafner	91	2005
2	Will Robertson	86	2017
3	Eli Putnam	84	2025
4	Ronnie Shore	80	2006
	Trevor Candelaria	80	2022
	Michael Carico	80	2022
	Michael O'Shaughnessy	80	2025
8	Eric Jones	79	2017
9	Alec Acosta	78	2017
	Alden Crissey	78	2007
	Tim Frend	78	2000

Single Game
Rk	Player	H	Season	Opponent
1	Gus Quattlebaum	6	1997	VCU

== Stolen Bases ==
Career
Rk	Player	SB	Seasons
1	Brian Joyce	88	1996 1997 1998 1999
2	Ben Brown	87	1997 1998 1999 2000
3	Billy Masse	64	1985 1986 1987
4	John Porter	62	1978 1979 1980 1981
5	Ron Kmacik	57	1987 1988 1989 1990
6	Luke Goodwin	49	1996 1997 1998
	Forrest Brandt	49	2011 2012 2013 2014
8	Andrew Musashe	42	2002 2003 2004 2005
9	Ronnie Shore	40	2003 2004 2005 2006
10	Paul Brannan	38	1991 1992 1993 1994
	Jazz Freitas	38	1991 1992 1993 1994

Season
Rk	Player	SB	Season
1	Brian Joyce	37	1999
2	Brian Joyce	34	1998
3	Billy Masse	27	1985
4	Ben Brown	25	1998
5	Ben Brown	24	1999
6	Ben Brown	23	2000
7	Billy Masse	22	1987
	Ron Kmacik	22	1990
	Jack Purcell	22	2000
10	Andrew Musashe	21	2005
	Jazz Freitas	21	1994

Single Game
Rk	Player	SB	Season	Opponent
1	Brian Joyce	4	1998	Cincinnati
	Brian Joyce	4	1998	Appalachian State

== Earned Run Average ==
Career (min. 92 IP)
Rk	Player	ERA	Seasons
1	Tim Barr	2.35	1974 1975 1976 1977
2	Rick Pipan	2.79	1969 1970 1971 1972
3	Howard Bryan	2.82	1964 1965 1966
4	Mike Hall	3.06	1974 1975 1976
	Joel Tew	3.06	1973 1974 1975 1976
6	Bennett Flynn	3.17	2020 2021 2022 2023
7	Gabe Levy	3.27	2019 2020 2021 2022
8	Wade Shepherd	3.31	1968 1969 1970 1971
9	Durin O'Linger	3.44	2013 2014 2015 2016 2017
	Ross Manire	3.44	1971 1972 1973 1974

Season (Min. 25 IP)
Rk	Player	ERA	Season
1	Matt Saeta	0.56	2015
2	Bennett Flynn	1.41	2022
3	Nolan DeVos	1.48	2021
4	Dave Fitzgerald	1.67	1986
5	Howard Bryan	1.70	1965
6	Matt Webb	1.80	2007
	Tim Frend	1.80	2001
8	Rick Pipan	1.82	1971
9	Tim Barr	1.99	1977
10	Wade Shepherd	2.00	1970

== Strikeouts ==
Career
Rk	Player	K	Seasons
1	Greg Wilcox	379	1987 1988 1989 1990
2	Andy Carter	258	2002 2003 2004 2005
3	Wes Self	243	1998 1999 2000 2001
4	Rob Wilson	238	2004 2005 2006 2007
5	Jonathan Coulombe	229	1994 1995 1996 1997
6	Steve Condon	211	1984 1985 1986 1987
7	Thomas Middour	209	2007 2008 2009 2010
8	Clark Beeker	208	2012 2013 2014 2015 2016
9	Wilson Perkins	200	2024 2025 2026
10	Scott Weaver	197	1983 1984 1985 1986

Season
Rk	Player	K	Season
1	Greg Wilcox	125	1990
2	Andy Paul	114	1992
3	Tim Barr	106	1977
	Nolan DeVos	106	2022
5	Greg Wilcox	99	1988
6	Blake Hely	97	2022
7	Durin O'Linger	96	2017
8	Brian Akin	95	2004
9	Scott Weaver	94	1985
10	Rob Wilson	90	2006

Single Game
Rk	Player	K	Season	Opponent
1	Clarence Clark	17	1908	Wake Forest
	Greg Wilcox	17	1988	Charlotte
