= 2022 Atlantic 10 Conference baseball tournament =

American college baseball tournament

- Teams: 7
- Format: Double-elimination
- Finals site: T. Henry Wilson Jr. Field; Davidson, North Carolina
- Champions: VCU (3rd title)
- Winning coach: Shawn Stiffler (3rd title)
- MVP: Tyler Locklear (VCU)

2022 Atlantic 10 Conference baseball standings
	Conf.						Overall
Team	W		L		T	PCT	W		L		T	PCT
Davidson ‍†‍‍	20	–	4	–	0	.833	43	–	13	–	0	.768
VCU ‍‍‡‍^{y}	19	–	5	–	0	.792	42	–	20	–	0	.677
Saint Louis ‍‍‍	14	–	9	–	0	.609	29	–	24	–	0	.547
Rhode Island ‍‍‍	14	–	10	–	0	.583	20	–	35	–	0	.364
George Mason ‍‍‍	13	–	11	–	0	.542	23	–	33	–	0	.411
Saint Joseph's ‍‍‍	12	–	11	–	0	.522	29	–	25	–	0	.537
Richmond ‍‍‍	11	–	13	–	0	.458	30	–	26	–	0	.536
Dayton ‍‍‍	10	–	14	–	0	.417	23	–	27	–	0	.460
George Washington ‍‍‍	10	–	14	–	0	.417	22	–	30	–	0	.423
Fordham ‍‍‍	9	–	15	–	0	.375	16	–	36	–	0	.308
UMass ‍‍‍	8	–	16	–	0	.333	22	–	26	–	1	.459
St. Bonaventure ‍‍‍	3	–	21	–	0	.125	6	–	39	–	0	.133
† – Conference champion ‡ – Tournament champion y – Invited to the NCAA tournament Rankings from D1Baseball

The 2022 Atlantic 10 Conference baseball tournament took place from May 24 to 28, 2022. The top seven regular season finishers of the league's twelve teams will meet in the double-elimination tournament to be held at T. Henry Wilson Jr. Field, the home field of Davidson in Davidson, North Carolina. The winner will earn the conference's automatic bid to the 2022 NCAA Division I baseball tournament.

== Seeding and format ==
The tournament used the same format adopted in 2014, with the top seven finishers from the regular season seeded one through seven. The top seed received a single bye while remaining seeds played on the first day.

Seed	School	Conference	Tiebreaker
1	Davidson	20–4	
2	VCU	19–5	
3	Saint Louis	14–9	
4	Rhode Island	14–10	
5	George Mason	13–11	
6	Saint Joseph's	12–11	
7	Richmond	11–13	

== Bracket ==
Upper round 1	Upper round 2	Upper final	Final
1	Davidson	6
5	George Mason	2
4	Rhode Island	3
5	George Mason	7
1	Davidson	6
2	VCU	14
3	Saint Louis	1
6	Saint Joseph's	2
2	VCU	8
6	Saint Joseph's	4
2	VCU	4
7	Richmond	3
2	VCU	10	—
7	Richmond	7	—
Lower round 1	Lower round 2	Lower round 3	Lower final
5	George Mason	3
4	Rhode Island	1	7	Richmond	7	1	Davidson	9
7	Richmond	4	7	Richmond	16	7	Richmond	12
3	Saint Louis	4
3	Saint Louis	10
6	Saint Joseph's	6
