= 2022 Davidson Wildcats baseball team =

2022 season for the Davidson Wildcats baseball program

2022 Davidson Wildcats baseball

Atlantic 10 regular season champion
- Conference: Atlantic 10 Conference
- Record: 43–13 (20–4 A-10)
- Head coach: Rucker Taylor (4th season)
- Assistant coaches: Ryan Munger (9th season); Parker Bangs (4th season); Jake Welch (1st season)
- Captains: Trevor Candelaria; Blake Hely
- Home stadium: Wilson Field

2022 Atlantic 10 Conference baseball standings
	Conf.						Overall
Team	W		L		T	PCT	W		L		T	PCT
Davidson ‍†‍‍	20	–	4	–	0	.833	43	–	13	–	0	.768
VCU ‍‍‡‍^{y}	19	–	5	–	0	.792	42	–	20	–	0	.677
Saint Louis ‍‍‍	14	–	9	–	0	.609	29	–	24	–	0	.547
Rhode Island ‍‍‍	14	–	10	–	0	.583	20	–	35	–	0	.364
George Mason ‍‍‍	13	–	11	–	0	.542	23	–	33	–	0	.411
Saint Joseph's ‍‍‍	12	–	11	–	0	.522	29	–	25	–	0	.537
Richmond ‍‍‍	11	–	13	–	0	.458	30	–	26	–	0	.536
Dayton ‍‍‍	10	–	14	–	0	.417	23	–	27	–	0	.460
George Washington ‍‍‍	10	–	14	–	0	.417	22	–	30	–	0	.423
Fordham ‍‍‍	9	–	15	–	0	.375	16	–	36	–	0	.308
UMass ‍‍‍	8	–	16	–	0	.333	22	–	26	–	1	.459
St. Bonaventure ‍‍‍	3	–	21	–	0	.125	6	–	39	–	0	.133
† – Conference champion ‡ – Tournament champion y – Invited to the NCAA tournament Rankings from D1Baseball

The 2022 Davidson Wildcats baseball team represented Davidson College during the 2022 NCAA Division I baseball season. It was the program's 121st baseball season, and their 7th season the Atlantic 10 Conference. The regular season began on February 18 and concluded on May 21, 2022.

The season was the program's first ever season winning the Atlantic 10 regular season championship, and the program's first ever season where they won 40 or more games. Additionally, Davidson was one of only two Division I baseball programs (the other being UC Santa Barbara) to win every weekend series during the season. The entered the Atlantic 10 tournament as the top seed, where they won their opening game against George Mason, however, the program lost consecutively to VCU and Richmond, causing them to finish third place in the tournament.

Davidson did not earn an at-large bid into the NCAA tournament.

== Preseason ==
=== Coaches Poll ===
The Atlantic 10 baseball coaches' poll was released on February 15, 2022. Davidson was picked to finish fifth in the Atlantic 10.

Coaches' Poll
Predicted finish	Team	Points
1	VCU	143 (11)
2	Dayton	122 (1)
3	Rhode Island	101
4	Saint Louis	94
5	Davidson	91
6	Fordham	83
7	George Washington	80
8	Richmond	76
9	Saint Joseph's	73
10	George Mason	33
11	UMass	26
12	St. Bonaventure	14

=== Preseason Atlantic 10 awards and honors ===
Trevor Candelaria and Blake Hely were named to the All-Atlantic 10 Preseason team.

Preseason All-Atlantic 10 Team
Player	No.	Position	Class
Trevor Candelaria	33	OF	Senior
Blake Hely	14	RHP	Senior

== Personnel ==
=== Roster ===
2022 Davidson Wildcats baseball team
Players
Coaches

#	Pos.	Name	B/T	Height	Weight	Year	Home town
			/	—	—
			/	—	—
			/	—	—
			/	—	—
			/	—	—
			/	—	—
			/	—	—
			/	—	—
			/	—	—
			/	—	—

Head coach

Assistant coach(es)

Legend

- (C) Team captain
- (S) Suspended
- (I) Ineligible
- Injured
- Current redshirt

=== Coaching staff ===
2022 Davidson Wildcats baseball coaching staff
Name	Position	Seasons at Davidson	Alma mater
Chris Clunie	Athletic Director	4	Davidson College (2006)
Rucker Taylor	Head coach	4	Vanderbilt University (2006)
Ryan Munger	Assistant Coach	7	Duke University (2013)
Parker Bangs	Assistant Coach	2	University of South Carolina (2010)
Jake Welch	Volunteer Assistant Coach	1	Bethune-Cookman University (2015)
Dylan Elber	Director of Player Development	2	Rutgers University (2013)
Evan Simon	Director of Sports Performance	4	Frostburg State University (2002)
Elizabeth Allred	Sports Dietitian	11	University of Virginia (1999)
Alex Northrup	Assistant Athletic Trainer	1	The Citadel (2021)
Justin Parker	Assistant Director	4	Wingate University (2002)
Cameron Krakowiak	Student Manager	1	Davidson College (2024)
Ben Laumakis	Student Manager	1	Davidson College (2024)

== Schedule and results ==
2022 Davidson Wildcats baseball game log (43–13)
Regular season (42–11)

February (6–1)
Date	Opponent	Rank	Site/stadium	Score	Win	Loss	Save	TV	Attendance	Overall record	A10 Record
February 18	Lehigh*		Wilson Field; Davidson, NC	**L** 0–5	Luke Rettig (1–0)	**Nolan Devos (0–1)**	Will Grisack (1)		333	0–1	—
February 19	Lehigh*		Wilson Field	**W** 10–6	**Ryan Kutz (1–0)**	Matt Stamford (0–1)	**Bennett Flynn (1)**		267	1–1	—
February 20	Lehigh*		Wilson Field	**W** 9–6	**Ryan Feczko (1–0)**	Nick Pave (0–1)	**Bennett Flynn (2)**		389	2–1	—
February 22	Radford*		Wilson Field	**W** 6–4	**Will Schomberg (1–0)**	Gene McGough (0–1)	**Gabe Levy (1)**	ESPN+	208	3–1	—
February 26	No. 22 Bryant*		Wilson Field	**W** 3–0	**Nolan Devos (1–1)**	Collin Lowe (1–1)	**Gabe Levy (2)**	ESPN+	313	4–1	—
February 27	No. 22 Bryant*		Wilson Field	**W** 11–0	**Blake Hely (1–0)**	Jared Burrows (0–1)	—		311	5–1	—
February 28	No. 22 Bryant*		Wilson Field	**W** 9–2	**Ryan Feczko (2–0)**	Logan Frasier (0–1)	—		259	6–1	—

March (13–4)
Date	Opponent	Rank	Site/stadium	Score	Win	Loss	Save	TV	Attendance	Overall record	A10 Record
March 2	North Carolina A&T*	No. 25	Wilson Field	**W** 3–0	**Alex Fenton (1–0)**	Jackson Hull (0–1)	**Gabe Levy (3)**		137	7–1	—
March 4	Columbia*	No. 25	Wilson Field	**W** 5–2	**Nolan Devos (2–1)**	Sean Higgins (1–1)	**Gabe Levy (4)**	ESPN+	276	8–1	—
March 5	Columbia*	No. 25	Wilson Field	**L** 6–7^{7} (Note: Game 1 of doubleheader vs. Columbia was reduced to seven innings.)	Justin Tucker (1–0)	**Bennett Flynn (0–1)**	—	ESPN+	343	8–2	—
March 5^{DH}	Columbia*	No. 25	Wilson Field	**L** 2–5^{7} (Note: Game 2 of doubleheader vs. Columbia was reduced to seven innings.)	Andy Leon (1–0)	**Ryan Kutz (1–1)**	J.D. Ogden (1)	ESPN+	257	8–3	—
March 6	Columbia*	No. 25	Wilson Field	**W** 6–4	**Ryan Feczko (3–0)**	Billy Black (0–2)	**Gabe Levy (5)**	ESPN+	217	9–3	—
March 8	Appalachian State*		Wilson Field	**Canceled (inclement weather).** (Note: Home game of home-and-home series vs. Appalachian State was never rescheduled.)							
March 11	Norfolk State*		Wilson Field	**W** 16–0	**Nolan Devos (3–1)**	James Deloatch (1–1)	—	ESPN+	227	10–3	—
March 12	Norfolk State*		Wilson Field	**W** 12–3	**Blake Hely (2–0)**	Justin Walton (0–3)	—	ESPN+	123	11–3	—
March 13	Norfolk State*		Wilson Field	**W** 12–1	**Ryan Feczko (4–0)**	Dalton Barham (0–4)	—	ESPN+	124	12–3	—
March 15	William & Mary*		Wilson Field	**W** 11–4^{7} (Note: Game 1 of doubleheader vs. William & Mary was reduced to seven innings.)	**Alex Fenton (2–0)**	Rojo Prarie (0–1)	—	ESPN+	219	13–3	—
March 15^{DH}	William & Mary*		Wilson Field	**W** 3–1^{7} (Note: Game 2 of doubleheader vs. William & Mary was reduced to seven innings.)	**Gabe Levy (1–0)**	Nate Knowles (1–1)	—	ESPN+	268	14–3	—
March 18	Lafayette*		Wilson Field	**W** 10–1	**Nolan Devos (4–1)**	Luke Benneche (1–4)	—	ESPN+	157	15–3	—
March 19	Lafayette*		Wilson Field	**W** 13–2	**Blake Hely (3–0)**	Kyle Subers (0–5)	—	ESPN+	344	16–3	—
March 20	Lafayette*		Wilson Field	**W** 14–9	**Alex Fenton (3–0)**	Jordan Yoder (1–1)	—	ESPN+	277	17–3	—
March 23	at Charlotte*		Hayes Stadium; Charlotte, NC	**Canceled (inclement weather).** (Note: Single-game series vs. Charlotte was never rescheduled.)							
March 25	UNC Greensboro*		Wilson Field	**L** 4–5^{11}	Alex Hoppe (4–1)	**Alex Fenton (3–1)**	Kross Robinson (3)		231	17–4	—
March 26	at UNC Greensboro*		UNCG Baseball Stadium; Greensboro, NC	**W** 9–2	**Will Schomberg (2–0)**	Jared Mathewson (2–2)	—	ESPN+	256	18–4	—
March 27	vs. UNC Greensboro*		Truist Point; High Point, NC	**W** 7–3	**Ryan Feczko (5–0)**	Hunter Shuey (0–2)	**Gabe Levy (6)**		272	19–4	—
March 29	at North Carolina A&T*		World War Memorial Stadium; Greensboro, NC	**L** 2–3^{13}	Jeremiah Foster (1–0)	**Danny Rosenfield (0–1)**	—	ESPN+	125	19–5	—

April (13–4)
Date	Opponent	Rank	Site/stadium	Score	Win	Loss	Save	TV	Attendance	Overall record	A10 Record
April 1	Richmond		Wilson Field	**W** 8–5	**Nolan Devos (5–1)**	Jeremy Neff (1–3)	—	ESPN+	446	20–5	1–0
April 2	Richmond		Wilson Field	**W** 8–7^{11}	**Will Schomberg (3–0)**	Rob Ready (1–1)	—	ESPN+	447	21–5	2–0
April 3	Richmond		Wilson Field	**W** 4–3	**Ryan Feczko (6–0)**	Alden Mathes (2–2)	**Bennett Flynn (3)**	ESPN+	423	22–5	3–0
April 5	at Duke*		Durham Bulls Athletic Park; Durham, NC	**Postponed (inclement weather). Make-up date May 17.**							
April 8	at VCU		The Diamond; Richmond, VA	**L** 6–7	Nolan Wilson (3–0)	**Alex Fenton (3–2)**	—	ESPN+	394	22–6	3–1
April 9	at VCU		The Diamond	**W** 7–2	**Blake Hely (4–0)**	Cade Dressler (0–1)	—	ESPN+	634	23–6	4–1
April 10	at VCU		The Diamond	**W** 7–2	**Ryan Feczko (7–0)**	Chase Hungate (3–3)	—	ESPN+	557	24–6	5–1
April 12	at Radford*		Radford Baseball Stadium; Radford, VA	**W** 13–9	**Will Schomberg (4–0)**	William Flanagan (0–4)	—	ESPN+	100	25–6	—
April 15	at St. Bonaventure		Fred Handler Park; Olean, NY	**W** 5–3	**Bennett Flynn (1–1)**	Branden Myers (0–1)	**Gabe Levy (7)**		150	26–6	6–1
April 16	at St. Bonaventure		Fred Handler Park	**W** 10–3	**Blake Hely (5–0)**	Bryce Hediger (0–5)	**Will Schomberg (1)**	ESPN+	135	27–6	7–1
April 16^{DH}	at St. Bonaventure		Fred Handler Park	**W** 11–4	**Ryan Feczko (8–0)**	Tripp Breen (1–3)	—	ESPN+	202	28–6	8–1
April 19	at Winthrop*		Winthrop Ballpark; Rock Hill, SC	**W** 15–5	**Bennett Flynn (2–1)**	Parker Kruglewicz (0–1)	—	ESPN+	311	29–6	—
April 22	Rhode Island		Wilson Field	**L** 5–7	Ryan Twitchell (1–4)	**Will Schomberg (4–1)**	Bryan Kraus (2)	ESPN+	343	29–7	8–2
April 23	Rhode Island		Wilson Field	**W** 23–12	**Blake Hely (6–0)**	Domenic Picone (3–4)	—	ESPN+	444	30–7	9–2
April 24	Rhode Island		Wilson Field	**W** 9–5	**Bennett Flynn (3–1)**	Bo Brutti (1–1)	—	ESPN+	456	31–7	10–2
April 26	at Appalachian State*		Jim and Bettie Smith Stadium; Boone, NC	**L** 9–10	Shane Roberts (1–0)	**Isaac Fix (0–1)**	—		204	31–8	—
April 29	at Saint Louis		Billiken Sports Center; St. Louis, MO	**L** 5–6	Logan Schmitt (7–1)	**Nolan Devos (5–2)**	Cameron Pferrer (7)	ESPN+	198	31–9	10–3
April 30	at Saint Louis		Billiken Sports Center	**W** 9–2	**Blake Hely (7–0)**	Trevor Harris (4–6)	**Gabe Levy (8)**	ESPN+	133	32–9	11–3

May (9–2)
Date	Opponent	Rank	Site/stadium	Score	Win	Loss	Save	TV	Attendance	Overall record	A10 Record
May 1	at Saint Louis		Billiken Sports Center	**W** 13–7	**Ryan Kutz (2–1)**	Jack Weber (0–3)	—	ESPN+	193	33–9	12–3
May 4	Winthrop*		Wilson Field	**W** 12–2^{8} (Note: Game ended after 8 innings due to run rule)	**Isaac Fix (1–1)**	Tyler Jones (1–6)	—	ESPN+	253	34–9	—
May 6	UMass		Wilson Field	**W** 5–3	**Nolan Devos (6–2)**	Kevin Dow (6–3)	**Bennett Flynn (4)**	ESPN+	176	35–9	13–3
May 7	UMass		Wilson Field	**W** 28–0	**Blake Hely (8–0)**	Tyler Dalton (1–4)	—	ESPN+	333	36–9	14–3
May 8	UMass		Wilson Field	**W** 12–3	**Ryan Feczko (9–0)**	Zach Clevenger (1–2)	—	ESPN+	307	37–9	15–3
May 12	at Saint Joseph's		Smithson Field; Philadelphia, PA	**W** 6–2	**Nolan Devos (7–2)**	Ian McCole (2–5)	**Bennett Flynn (5)**	ESPN+	225	38–9	16–3
May 13	at Saint Joseph's		Smithson Field	**W** 6–0	**Blake Hely (9–0)**	Luke Smith (4–5)	—	ESPN+	210	39–9	17–3
May 14	at Saint Joseph's		Smithson Field	**W** 8–7	**Gabe Levy (2–0)**	Ryan Devine (2–4)	**Will Schomberg (2)**	ESPN+	200	40–9	18–3
May 17	at Duke*; Rescheduled from April 5		Jack Coombs Field (Note: Duke plays home matches at Jack Coombs Field during weekday games and Durham Bulls Athletic Park during weekend games.); Durham, NC	**L** 2–11	Aaron Beasley (1–0)	**Nick Shedleski (0–1)**	—	ACCNX	768	40–10	—
May 19	George Mason		Wilson Field	**W** 17–4	**Nolan Devos (8–2)**	Ben Shields (2–3)	—		234	41–10	19–3
May 20	George Mason		Wilson Field	**L** 4–9	Ryan Peterson (4–2)	**Blake Hely (9–1)**	Chad Gartland (3)		268	41–11	19–4
May 21	George Mason		Wilson Field	**W** 12–4	**Ryan Feczko (10–0)**	Danny Hosley (3–4)	—	ESPN+	245	42–11	20–4

Postseason (1–2)

A10 Tournament (1–2)
Date	Opponent	Seed	Site/stadium	Score	Win	Loss	Save	TV	Attendance	Overall record	A10T Record
May 25	(5) George Mason; Game 4	(1)	Wilson Field	**W** 6–2	**Nolan Devos (9–2)**	Ryan Peterson (4–3)	**Bennett Flynn (6)**	ESPN+	394	43–11	1–0
May 26	(2) VCU; Semifinal	(1)	Wilson Field	**L** 6–14	Evan Chenier (2–0)	**Blake Hely (9–2)**	—	ESPN+	825	43–12	1–1
May 26	(7) Richmond; Third place game	(1)	Wilson Field	**L** 9–12	Winston Allen (1–1)	**Will Schomberg (4–2)**	—	ESPN+	677	43–13	1–2

Legend: = Win = Loss = Canceled
Bold = Davidson team member
Rankings are based on the team's current ranking in the D1Baseball poll.

Schedule Notes

== Tournaments ==
=== Atlantic 10 Tournament ===
Atlantic 10 Tournament Teams
(1) Davidson Wildcats	(2) VCU Rams	(3) Saint Louis Billikens	(4) Rhode Island Rams	(5) George Mason Patriots	(6) Saint Joseph's Hawks	(7) Richmond Spiders

Upper round 1	Upper round 2	Upper final	Final
1	Davidson	6
5	George Mason	2
4	Rhode Island	3
5	George Mason	7
1	Davidson	6
2	VCU	14
3	Saint Louis	1
6	Saint Joseph's	2
2	VCU	8
6	Saint Joseph's	4
2	VCU	4
7	Richmond	3
2	VCU	10	—
7	Richmond	7	—
Lower round 1	Lower round 2	Lower round 3	Lower final
5	George Mason	3
4	Rhode Island	1	7	Richmond	7	1	Davidson	9
7	Richmond	4	7	Richmond	16	7	Richmond	12
3	Saint Louis	4
3	Saint Louis	10
6	Saint Joseph's	6

== Statistics ==
Statistics current through May 20, 2022.

=== Team batting ===
Team	AB	Avg.	H	2B	3B	HR	RBI	SLG	BB	SO
Davidson	1814	.304	552	133	14	78	417	.522	305	463
Opponents	1710	.217	371	79	5	39	186	.337	194	509

=== Team pitching ===
Team	IP	H	R	ER	BB	SO	SV	ERA
Davidson	463.2	371	215	186	194	509	15	3.61
Opponents	441.0	552	450	411	305	463	6	8.39

=== Individual batting ===
Note: leaders must meet the minimum requirement of 2 PA/G and 75% of games played

Player	GP	AB	Avg.	H	2B	3B	HR	RBI	BB	SO	SB

=== Individual pitching ===
Note: leaders must meet the minimum requirement of 1 IP/G

Player	GP	GS	W	L	IP	H	R	ER	BB	SO	SV	ERA

Legend
GP	Games played	GS	Games started	AB	At-bats
H	Hits	Avg.	Batting average	2B	Doubles
3B	Triples	HR	Home runs	RBI	Runs batted in
IP	Innings pitched	W	Wins	L	Losses
ERA	Earned run average	SO	Strikeouts	BB	Base on balls
SV	Saves	SB	Stolen bases	High	Team high

== Rankings ==
Ranking movements Legend: ██ Increase in ranking ██ Decrease in ranking — = Not ranked RV = Received votes
	Week																			
Poll	Pre	1	2	3	4	5	6	7	8	9	10	11	12	13	14	15	16	17	18	Final
Coaches'	—	—*	RV	—	—	—	—	RV	RV	RV	—	RV	RV	RV	RV	RV	—	—	—	—
Baseball America	—	—	—	—	—	—	—	—	—	—	—	—	—	—	—	—	—	—	—	—
Collegiate Baseball^	—	—	25	RV	—	—	—	—	—	—	—	—	—	—	RV	RV	—	—	—	—
NCBWA†	—	—	—	—	RV	RV	RV	RV	RV	RV	RV	RV	RV	RV	RV	RV	—	—	—	—
D1Baseball	—	—	—	—	—	—	—	—	—	—	—	—	—	—	—	—	—	—	—	—

^ Collegiate Baseball ranked 40 teams in their preseason poll, but only ranked 30 teams weekly during the season.
† NCBWA ranks 30 teams in their preseason poll, but only ranks 25 teams weekly during the season.
* A new poll was not released for this week, so for comparison purposes, the previous week's ranking is inserted in this week's slot.
