= 2022 Fordham Rams baseball team =

American college baseball season

2022 Fordham Rams baseball
- Conference: Atlantic 10 Conference
- Record: 16–36 (9–18 A-10)
- Head coach: Kevin Leighton (12th season)
- Associate head coach: Tony Mellaci (34th season)
- Assistant coach: Elliot Glynn (3rd season)
- Hitting coach: Eddie Cribby (1st season)
- Pitching coach: Pat Porter (4th season)
- Home stadium: Houlihan Park

2022 Atlantic 10 Conference baseball standings
	Conf.						Overall
Team	W		L		T	PCT	W		L		T	PCT
Davidson ‍†‍‍	20	–	4	–	0	.833	43	–	13	–	0	.768
VCU ‍‍‡‍^{y}	19	–	5	–	0	.792	42	–	20	–	0	.677
Saint Louis ‍‍‍	14	–	9	–	0	.609	29	–	24	–	0	.547
Rhode Island ‍‍‍	14	–	10	–	0	.583	20	–	35	–	0	.364
George Mason ‍‍‍	13	–	11	–	0	.542	23	–	33	–	0	.411
Saint Joseph's ‍‍‍	12	–	11	–	0	.522	29	–	25	–	0	.537
Richmond ‍‍‍	11	–	13	–	0	.458	30	–	26	–	0	.536
Dayton ‍‍‍	10	–	14	–	0	.417	23	–	27	–	0	.460
George Washington ‍‍‍	10	–	14	–	0	.417	22	–	30	–	0	.423
Fordham ‍‍‍	9	–	15	–	0	.375	16	–	36	–	0	.308
UMass ‍‍‍	8	–	16	–	0	.333	22	–	26	–	1	.459
St. Bonaventure ‍‍‍	3	–	21	–	0	.125	6	–	39	–	0	.133
† – Conference champion ‡ – Tournament champion y – Invited to the NCAA tournament Rankings from D1Baseball

The 2022 Fordham Rams baseball team represented Fordham University during the 2022 NCAA Division I baseball season. It was the program's 163rd season of existence, and their 28th season playing in the Atlantic 10 Conference. General manager, Kevin Leighton assumed managerial duties for the 12th season.

== Background ==
The 2021 season saw Fordham post a 24–19 (11–9 Atlantic 10) record. The Rams failed to qualify for the 2021 Atlantic 10 Conference baseball tournament.

== Preseason ==
=== Coaches poll ===
The Atlantic 10 baseball coaches' poll was released on February 15, 2022. Fordham was picked to finish sixth in the Atlantic 10.

Coaches' Poll
Predicted finish	Team	Points
1	VCU	143 (11)
2	Dayton	122 (1)
3	Rhode Island	101
4	Saint Louis	94
5	Davidson	91
6	Fordham	83
7	George Washington	80
8	Richmond	76
9	Saint Joseph's	73
10	George Mason	33
11	UMass	26
12	St. Bonaventure	14

== Player movement ==
=== Departures ===
Fordham Departures
Name	Number	Pos.	Height	Weight	Year	Hometown	Notes
Casey Brown	4	1B	6 ft 6 in (1.98 m)	250	Sr.	Darien, Connecticut,	Graduated
Alex Hernandez	29	RHP	6 ft 1 in (1.85 m)	185	Gr.	San Mateo, California	Graduated
Nick Labella	28	OF	5 ft 11 in (1.80 m)	210	Sr.	Mesa, Arizona	Graduated
Alvin Melendez	7	U	6 ft 0 in (1.83 m)	195	Sr.	Whitestone, New York,	Graduated
Matt Mikulski	37	LHP	6 ft 4 in (1.93 m)	205	Sr.	Mohegan Lake, New York,	Drafted by San Francisco Giants in the 2021 MLB draft
Joseph Quintal	6	RHP	6 ft 2 in (1.88 m)	185	Sr.	Bedford, New Hampshire	Graduated
Colton Snelling	1	OF	6 ft 0 in (1.83 m)	180	Sr.	Chandler, Arizona	Graduated
C. J. Vazquez	10	IF	6 ft 0 in (1.83 m)	180	Sr.	Miami, Florida,	Graduated

=== Signing-day recruits ===
The following players signed National Letter of Intents to play for Fordham in 2022.

Player	Hometown	Previous Team
Pitchers
Gannon Brady	Ocean City, New Jersey	Ocean City HS
Alex Casarella	Bedford Hills, New York	Fox Lane HS
Connor Haywood	Newtown, Connecticut	Newtown HS (CT)
Sebastian Mexico	Baldwinville, Massachusetts	Phillips Academy
Anthony Scarlata	Bridgewater, New Jersey	Bridgewater-Raritan HS
Robbie Stewart	Darien, Connecticut	Avon Old Farms
Bobby Sullivan	Ridgewood, New Jersey	Ridgewood HS (NJ)
Hitters
Ryan Meyer	Shrewsbury, Massachusetts	Shrewsbury HS (MA)
Diego Prieto	Doral, Florida	Christopher Columbus HS (FL)
Cian Sahler	Olney, Maryland	Georgetown Preparatory School
T.J. Wachter	Miller Place, New York	The Stony Brook School

== Personnel ==
=== Coaching staff ===
2022 fordham rams baseball coaching staff
Name	Position	Seasons at Fordham	Alma mater
Kevin Leighton	Head coach	12	Seton Hall University (2001)
Tony Mellaci	Associate head coach	34	Mercy College (1981)
Elliot Glynn	Assistant Coach	5	University of Connecticut (2011)
Pat Porter	Pitch Coach	3	Ohio State University (2015)
Eddie Cribby	Hitting Coach	2	University of Washington (2010)

== Game log ==
Legend
	Fordham win
	Fordham loss
	Postponement/cancellation
(10)	Extra innings
*	Non-conference game
**Bold**	Fordham team member
†	Make-up game

2022 Fordham Rams baseball game log
Regular season (2–9)

February (1–6)
Date	Opponent	Rank	Site/stadium	Score	Win	Loss	Save	TV	Attendance	Overall record	A10 record
February 18	at Texas A&M*		Olsen Field; College Station, TX	**L** 1–13	Dettmer (1–0)	**Karlso (0–1)**	—	SECN+	6,431	0–1	—
February 19	at Texas A&M*		Olsen Field	**L** 3–5	Dallas (1–0)	**Ey (0–1)**	Hogan (1)	SECN+	5,988	0–2	—
February 20	at Texas A&M*		Olsen Field	**L** 4–5	Cortez (1–0)	**Quintal (0–1)**	—	SECN+	5,166	0–3	—
February 23	Sacred Heart*		Houlihan Park; The Bronx, NY	**W** 19–0	**Knox (1–0)**	Babuschak (0–1)	—		257	1–3	—
February 25	at Virginia Tech*		English Field; Blacksburg, VA	**L** 0–12	Green (2–0)	**Karlso (0–2)**	—	ACCNX	349	1–4	—
February 26	at Virginia Tech*		English Field	**L** 2–8	Weycker (1–0)	**Ey (0–2)**	—	ACCNX	611	1–5	—
February 27	at Virginia Tech*		English Field	**L** 3–7	Hackenberg (2–0)	**Popolizio (0–1)**	—		570	1–6	—

March (1–3)
Date	Opponent	Rank	Site/stadium	Score	Win	Loss	Save	TV	Attendance	Overall record	A10 record
March 2	Manhattan*; Battle of the Bronx		Houlihan Park	**W** 9–6	**Kovel (1–0)**	McGrath (0–1)	—		114	2–6	—
March 4	at Florida Atlantic*		FAU Baseball Stadium; Boca Raton, FL	**L** 5–9	Visconti (1–0)	**Quintal (0–1)**	—	CUSA.tv	447	2–7	—
March 5	at Florida Atlantic*		FAU Baseball Stadium	**L** 10–15	Rivero (2–0)	**Ey (0–3)**	Martzolf (1)	CUSA.tv	528	2–8	—
March 6	at Florida Atlantic*		FAU Baseball Stadium	**L** 3–10	Josey (1–2)	**Hughes (0–1)**	—	CUSA.tv	447	2–9	—
March 9	Stony Brook*		Houlihan Park	**Canceled (inclement weather)**							
March 11	LIU*		Houlihan Park								
March 12	LIU*		Houlihan Park								
March 13	LIU*		Houlihan Park								
March 16	Wagner*		Houlihan Park								
March 18	Marist*		Houlihan Park								
March 19	at Marist*		McCann Field; Poughkeepsie, NY								
March 20	Marist*		Houlihan Park								
March 22	Siena*		Houlihan Park								
March 25	Monmouth*		Houlihan Park								
March 26	Monmouth*		Houlihan Park								
March 27	at Monmouth*		Monmouth Baseball Field; West Long Branch, NJ								
March 29	Manhattan*; Battle of the Bronx		Houlihan Park								

April (0–0)
Date	Opponent	Rank	Site/stadium	Score	Win	Loss	Save	TV	Attendance	Overall record	SEC record
April 1	Saint Louis		Houlihan Park								
April 2	Saint Louis		Houlihan Park								
April 3	Saint Louis		Houlihan Park								
April 5	at Siena*		Siena Baseball Field; Loudonville, NY								
April 8	at UMass		Earl Lorden Field; Amherst, MA								
April 9	at UMass		Earl Lorden Field								
April 10	at UMass		Earl Lorden Field								
April 12	at Columbia*; Liberty Cup		Satow Stadium; New York City, NY								
April 14	Dayton		Houlihan Park								
April 15	Dayton		Houlihan Park								
April 16	Dayton		Houlihan Park								
April 19	at Army*		Doubleday Field; West Point, NY								
April 20	Fairfield*		Houlihan Park								
April 22	at George Mason		Spuhler Field; Fairfax, VA								
April 23	at George Mason		Spuhler Field								
April 24	at George Mason		Spuhler Field								
April 26	Iona*		Houlihan Park								
April 27	at Fairleigh Dickinson*		Naimoli Field; Teaneck, NJ								
April 29	Saint Joseph's		Houlihan Park								
April 30	Saint Joseph's		Houlihan Park								

May (0–0)
Date	Opponent	Rank	Site/stadium	Score	Win	Loss	Save	TV	Attendance	Overall record	SEC record
May 1	Saint Joseph's		Houlihan Park								
May 3	NJIT*		Houlihan Park								
May 6	at Rhode Island		Bill Beck Field; Kingston, RI								
May 7	at Rhode Island		Bill Beck Field								
May 8	at Rhode Island		Bill Beck Field								
May 13	St. Bonaventure		Houlihan Park								
May 14	St. Bonaventure		Houlihan Park								
May 15	St. Bonaventure		Houlihan Park								
May 17	at Villanova*		Villanova Ballpark at Plymouth; Philadelphia, PA								
May 19	at VCU		The Diamond; Richmond, VA								
May 20	at VCU		The Diamond								
May 21	at VCU		The Diamond								

Schedule source:

*Rankings are based on the team's current ranking in the D1Baseball poll.

== Rankings ==
Ranking movements Legend: — = Not ranked
	Week																			
Poll	Pre	1	2	3	4	5	6	7	8	9	10	11	12	13	14	15	16	17	18	Final
Coaches'	—	—*	—	—	—	—	—	—	—	—	—	—								
Baseball America	—	—	—	—	—	—	—	—	—	—	—	—								
Collegiate Baseball^	—	—	—	—	—	—	—	—	—	—	—	—								
NCBWA†	—	—	—	—	—	—	—	—	—	—	—	—								
D1Baseball	—	—	—	—	—	—	—	—	—	—	—	—								

^ Collegiate Baseball ranked 40 teams in their preseason poll, but only ranked 30 teams weekly during the season.
† NCBWA ranks 30 teams in their preseason poll, but only ranks 25 teams weekly during the season.
* A new poll was not released for this week, so for comparison purposes, the previous week's ranking is inserted in this week's slot.
