= 2022 Rhode Island Rams baseball team =

American college baseball season

2022 Rhode Island Rams baseball
- Conference: Atlantic 10 Conference
- Record: 20–31 (14–8 A10)
- Head coach: Raphael Cerrato (8th season)
- Associate head coach: Sean O'Brien (8th season)
- Assistant coach: Kevin Heiss (1st season)
- Pitching coach: David Fischer (1st season)
- Home stadium: Bill Beck Field

2022 Atlantic 10 Conference baseball standings
	Conf.						Overall
Team	W		L		T	PCT	W		L		T	PCT
Davidson ‍†‍‍	20	–	4	–	0	.833	43	–	13	–	0	.768
VCU ‍‍‡‍^{y}	19	–	5	–	0	.792	42	–	20	–	0	.677
Saint Louis ‍‍‍	14	–	9	–	0	.609	29	–	24	–	0	.547
Rhode Island ‍‍‍	14	–	10	–	0	.583	20	–	35	–	0	.364
George Mason ‍‍‍	13	–	11	–	0	.542	23	–	33	–	0	.411
Saint Joseph's ‍‍‍	12	–	11	–	0	.522	29	–	25	–	0	.537
Richmond ‍‍‍	11	–	13	–	0	.458	30	–	26	–	0	.536
Dayton ‍‍‍	10	–	14	–	0	.417	23	–	27	–	0	.460
George Washington ‍‍‍	10	–	14	–	0	.417	22	–	30	–	0	.423
Fordham ‍‍‍	9	–	15	–	0	.375	16	–	36	–	0	.308
UMass ‍‍‍	8	–	16	–	0	.333	22	–	26	–	1	.459
St. Bonaventure ‍‍‍	3	–	21	–	0	.125	6	–	39	–	0	.133
† – Conference champion ‡ – Tournament champion y – Invited to the NCAA tournament Rankings from D1Baseball

The 2022 Rhode Island Rams baseball team represented the University of Rhode Island during the 2022 NCAA Division I baseball season. The Rams played their home games at Bill Beck Field as a member of the Atlantic 10 Conference They were led by head coach Raphael Cerrato, in his eighth year as manager.

== Previous season ==
The 2021 team won the Northern Division championship, obtaining a record of 28–26–1 (13–6) before losing in the semifinal round of the 2021 Atlantic 10 Conference baseball tournament. They did not earn an at-large bid into the NCAA tournament.

== Tournaments ==
=== Atlantic 10 tournament ===
Atlantic 10 tournament teams
(1) Davidson Wildcats	(2) VCU Rams	(3) Saint Louis Billikens	(4) Rhode Island Rams	(5) George Mason Patriots	(6) Saint Joseph's Hawks	(7) Richmond Spiders

Upper round 1	Upper round 2	Upper final	Final
1	Davidson	6
5	George Mason	2
4	Rhode Island	3
5	George Mason	7
1	Davidson	6
2	VCU	14
3	Saint Louis	1
6	Saint Joseph's	2
2	VCU	8
6	Saint Joseph's	4
2	VCU	4
7	Richmond	3
2	VCU	10	—
7	Richmond	7	—
Lower round 1	Lower round 2	Lower round 3	Lower final
5	George Mason	3
4	Rhode Island	1	7	Richmond	7	1	Davidson	9
7	Richmond	4	7	Richmond	16	7	Richmond	12
3	Saint Louis	4
3	Saint Louis	10
6	Saint Joseph's	6
