= 2022 Dayton Flyers baseball team =

American college baseball season

2022 Dayton Flyers baseball
- Conference: Atlantic 10 Conference
- Record: 23–27 (10–14 A-10)
- Head coach: Jayson King (5th season)
- Assistant coaches: Adam Cornwell (3rd season); Kyle Decker (2nd season)
- Pitching coach: Travis Ferrick (5th season)
- Home stadium: Woerner Field

2022 Atlantic 10 Conference baseball standings
	Conf.						Overall
Team	W		L		T	PCT	W		L		T	PCT
Davidson ‍†‍‍	20	–	4	–	0	.833	43	–	13	–	0	.768
VCU ‍‍‡‍^{y}	19	–	5	–	0	.792	42	–	20	–	0	.677
Saint Louis ‍‍‍	14	–	9	–	0	.609	29	–	24	–	0	.547
Rhode Island ‍‍‍	14	–	10	–	0	.583	20	–	35	–	0	.364
George Mason ‍‍‍	13	–	11	–	0	.542	23	–	33	–	0	.411
Saint Joseph's ‍‍‍	12	–	11	–	0	.522	29	–	25	–	0	.537
Richmond ‍‍‍	11	–	13	–	0	.458	30	–	26	–	0	.536
Dayton ‍‍‍	10	–	14	–	0	.417	23	–	27	–	0	.460
George Washington ‍‍‍	10	–	14	–	0	.417	22	–	30	–	0	.423
Fordham ‍‍‍	9	–	15	–	0	.375	16	–	36	–	0	.308
UMass ‍‍‍	8	–	16	–	0	.333	22	–	26	–	1	.459
St. Bonaventure ‍‍‍	3	–	21	–	0	.125	6	–	39	–	0	.133
† – Conference champion ‡ – Tournament champion y – Invited to the NCAA tournament Rankings from D1Baseball

The 2022 Dayton Flyers baseball team represented the University of Dayton during the 2022 NCAA Division I baseball season. The Flyers played their home games at Woerner Field as a member of the Atlantic 10 Conference. They were led by head coach Jayson King, in his 5th season at Dayton.

== Background ==
The 2021 season saw Fordham post a 24–27 (12–4 Atlantic 10) record. The Flyers reached the championship round of the 2021 Atlantic 10 Conference baseball tournament, where they lost to VCU. They did not earn an at-large bid into the 2021 NCAA Division I baseball tournament.

== Preseason ==
=== Coaches poll ===
The Atlantic 10 baseball coaches' poll was released on February 15, 2022. Dayton was picked to finish second in the Atlantic 10.

Coaches' Poll
Predicted finish	Team	Points
1	VCU	143 (11)
2	Dayton	122 (1)
3	Rhode Island	101
4	Saint Louis	94
5	Davidson	91
6	Fordham	83
7	George Washington	80
8	Richmond	76
9	Saint Joseph's	73
10	George Mason	33
11	UMass	26
12	St. Bonaventure	14

== Personnel ==
=== Coaching staff ===
2022 Dayton Flyers baseball coaching staff
Name	Position	Seasons at Dayton	Alma mater
Jayson King	Head coach	5	Framingham (1993)
Adam Cornwell	Assistant Coach	5	Ball State (2018)
Kyle Decker	Assistant Coach	2	Oberlin (2016)
Travis Ferrick	Pitching Coach	4	Boston College (2017)

== Game log ==
2022 Dayton Flyers baseball game log
Regular season

February
Date	Opponent	Rank	Site/stadium	Score	Win	Loss	Save	TV	Attendance	Overall record	A10 record
February 18	at North Carolina A&T*		World War Memorial Stadium; Greensboro, NC	**W** 8–4	**Serwa (1–0)**	Carter (0–1)	—		110	1–0	—
February 19	at North Carolina A&T*		World War Memorial Stadium	**W** 9–7	**Whitten (1–0)**	Jarosz (0–1)	—		100	2–0	—
February 20	at North Carolina A&T*		World War Memorial Stadium	**W** 4–3	**Hellgeth (1–0)**	Meachem (0–1)	—		125	3–0	—
February 25	at Evansville*		Charles H. Braun Stadium; Evansville, IN	**L** 2–11	Gray (1–1)	**Serwa (1–1)**	Reinhardt (1)		242	3–1	—
February 26	at Evansville*		Charles H. Braun Stadium	**W** 4–2	**Zapka (1–0)**	Dominik (0–1)	—		236	4–1	—
February 27	at Evansville*		Charles H. Braun Stadium	**W** 5–4	**Hattrup (1–0)**	Harris (0–2)	Silverstein (1)		236	5–1	—

March
Date	Opponent	Rank	Site/stadium	Score	Win	Loss	Save	TV	Attendance	Overall record	A10 record
March 2	at Eastern Kentucky*		Turkey Hughes Field; Richmond, KY	**L** 3–11	Leontarakis (2–0)	**Espelin (0–1)**	—		200	5–2	—
March 4	at Belmont*		E. S. Rose Park; Nashville, TN	**L** 6–7	Baratta (3–0)	**Serwa (1–2)**	Brennan (6)		115	5–3	—
March 5	at Belmont*		E. S. Rose Park	**W** 6–5	**Steinhauer (1–0)**	Bean (2–1)	**Zapka (1)**		220	6–3	—
March 6	at Belmont*		E. S. Rose Park	**W** 11–9	**Majick (1–0)**	Brennan (0–1)	Brush (1)		144	7–3	—
March 8	at Wright State*		Nischwitz Stadium; Fairborn, OH	**L** 0–14	Wirsing (1–0)	**Hattrup (1–1)**	—	GCSN	192	7–4	—
March 9	Northern Kentucky*		Woerner Field; Dayton, OH	**Canceled (inclement weather)**							
March 11	Milwaukee*		Woerner Field								
March 12	Milwaukee*		Woerner Field								
March 13	Milwaukee*		Woerner Field								
March 15	at Purdue*		Alexander Field; West Lafayette, IN					BTN+			
March 16	at Purdue Fort Wayne*		Mastodon Field; Fort Wayne, IN								
March 18	at Michigan*		Ray Fisher Stadium; Ann Arbor, MI					BTN+			
March 19	at Michigan*		Ray Fisher Stadium					BTN+			
March 20	at Michigan*		Ray Fisher Stadium					BTN+			
March 25	at Tulane*		Greer Field; New Orleans, LA								
March 26	at Tulane*		Greer Field								
March 27	at Tulane*		Greer Field								

April
Date	Opponent	Rank	Site/stadium	Score	Win	Loss	Save	TV	Attendance	Overall record	A10 record
April 1	Rhode Island		Woerner Field								
April 2	Rhode Island		Woerner Field								
April 3	Rhode Island		Woerner Field								
April 5	at Northern Kentucky*		Bill Aker Field; Highland Heights, KY								
April 6	Eastern Kentucky*		Woerner Field								
April 8	at George Washington		Barcroft Park; Arlington, VA								
April 9	at George Washington		Barcroft Park								
April 10	at George Washington		Barcroft Park								
April 12	Ohio State*		Day Air Ballpark; Dayton, OH								
April 14	at Fordham		Houlihan Park; The Bronx, NY								
April 15	at Fordham		Houlihan Park								
April 16	at Fordham		Houlihan Park								
April 19	Wright State*		Woerner Field								
April 20	at Butler*		Bulldog Park; Indianapolis, IN								
April 22	UMass		Woerner Field								
April 23	UMass		Woerner Field								
April 24	UMass		Woerner Field								
April 26	at Kentucky*		Kentucky Proud Park; Lexington, KY								
April 29	VCU		Woerner Field								
April 30	VCU		Woerner Field								

May
Date	Opponent	Rank	Site/stadium	Score	Win	Loss	Save	TV	Attendance	Overall record	A10 record
May 1	VCU		Woerner Field								
May 6	at St. Bonaventure		Fred Handler Park; Olean, NY								
May 7	at St. Bonaventure		Fred Handler Park								
May 8	at St. Bonaventure		Fred Handler Park								
May 10	Purdue Fort Wayne*		Woerner Field								
May 13	Richmond		Woerner Field								
May 14	Richmond		Woerner Field								
May 15	Richmond		Woerner Field								
May 19	at Saint Louis		Billiken Sports Center; St. Louis, MO								
May 20	at Saint Louis		Billiken Sports Center								
May 21	at Saint Louis		Billiken Sports Center								

Postseason

A10 Tournament
Date	Opponent	Seed	Site/stadium	Score	Win	Loss	Save	TV	Attendance	Overall record	A10T Record
May 25–28			Houlihan Park								

Legend: = Win = Loss = Canceled
* = Non-conference game Bold = Dayton team member
Rankings are based on the team's current ranking in the D1Baseball poll.

== Rankings ==
Ranking movements Legend: — = Not ranked
	Week																			
Poll	Pre	1	2	3	4	5	6	7	8	9	10	11	12	13	14	15	16	17	18	Final
Coaches'	—	—*	—	—	—	—	—	—	—	—	—	—	—	—	—	—	—	—	—	—
Baseball America	—	—	—	—	—	—	—	—	—	—	—	—	—	—	—	—	—	—	—	—
Collegiate Baseball^	—	—	—	—	—	—	—	—	—	—	—	—	—	—	—	—	—	—	—	—
NCBWA†	—	—	—	—	—	—	—	—	—	—	—	—	—	—	—	—	—	—	—	—
D1Baseball	—	—	—	—	—	—	—	—	—	—	—	—	—	—	—	—	—	—	—	—

^ Collegiate Baseball ranked 40 teams in their preseason poll, but only ranked 30 teams weekly during the season.
† NCBWA ranks 30 teams in their preseason poll, but only ranks 25 teams weekly during the season.
* A new poll was not released for this week, so for comparison purposes, the previous week's ranking is inserted in this week's slot.
