= Shawn Camp (baseball) =

American baseball player (born 1975)

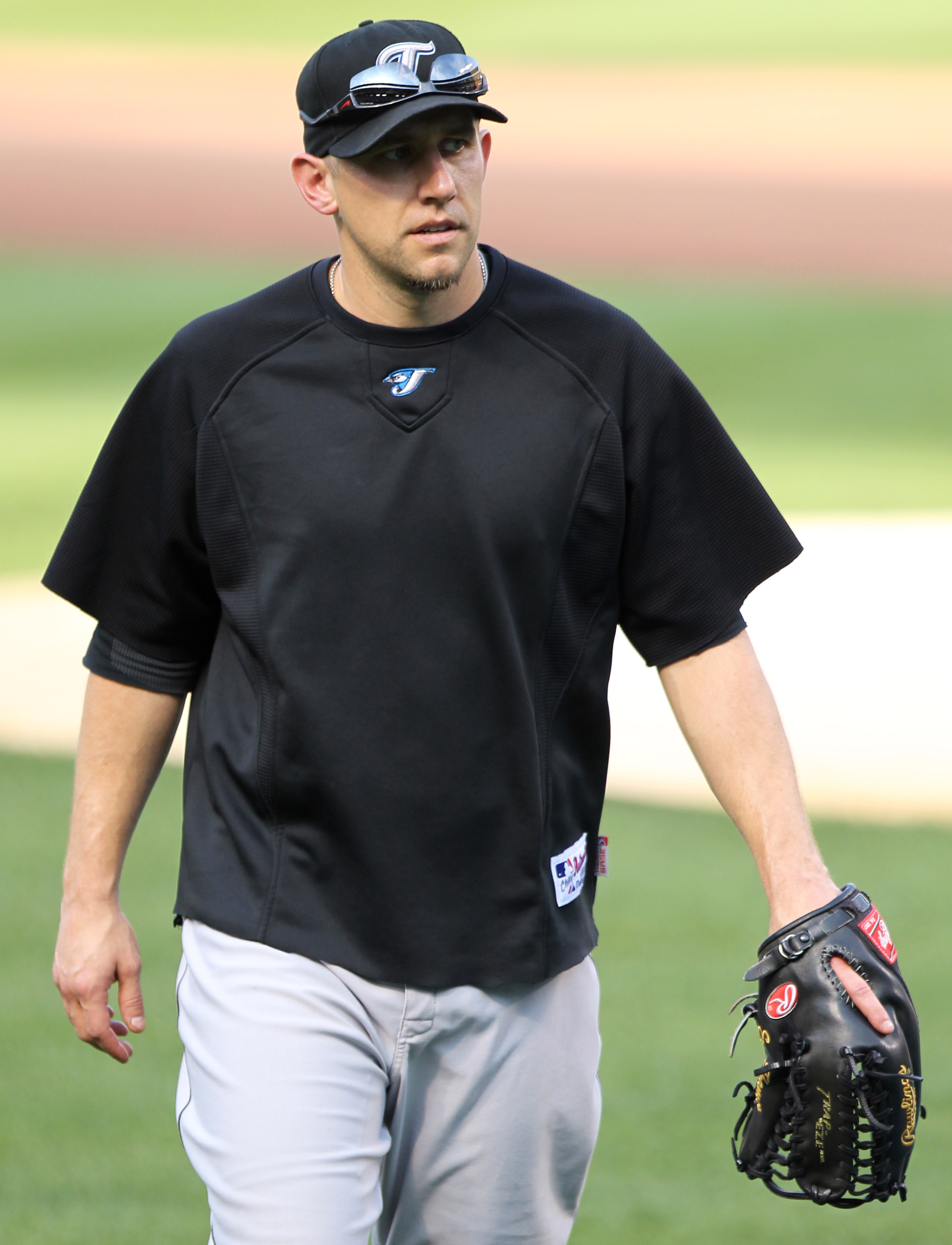
- Camp with the Toronto Blue Jays in 2011

George Mason Patriots
- Relief pitcher / Coach
- Born: November 18, 1975 (age 51); Fairfax, Virginia, U.S.
- Batted: Right Threw: Right

MLB debut
- April 5, 2004, for the Kansas City Royals

Last MLB appearance
- May 7, 2014, for the Philadelphia Phillies

MLB statistics
- Win–loss record: 29–33
- Earned run average: 4.41
- Strikeouts: 403
- Stats at Baseball Reference

Teams
- Kansas City Royals (2004–2005); Tampa Bay Devil Rays (2006–2007); Toronto Blue Jays (2008–2011); Chicago Cubs (2012–2013); Philadelphia Phillies (2014)

Shawn Anthony Camp (born November 18, 1975) is an American baseball coach and former pitcher, who is the current head coach of the George Mason Patriots. He played college baseball for George Mason from 1995 to 1997. He played in Major League Baseball (MLB) from 2004 to 2014 with his longest tenure as a player with the Toronto Blue Jays. He also played for the Kansas City Royals, Tampa Bay Devil Rays, Chicago Cubs, and Philadelphia Phillies.

== Early career ==
Camp began his baseball career as a catcher at Robinson Secondary School in Fairfax, Virginia. He graduated from high school in 1994 and continued as a backstop in college while attending George Mason University, where he played for coach Bill Brown. Struggling to hit collegiate pitching, Camp converted to a pitcher at George Mason with the help of then Patriots assistant baseball coach Dayton Moore. In 1996, he played collegiate summer baseball with the Chatham A's of the Cape Cod Baseball League.

== Professional career ==
=== San Diego Padres ===
Camp was drafted in the sixteenth round of the 1997 amateur entry draft by the San Diego Padres; the 500th overall selection of that year's draft. The newly converted reliever steadily climbed the ranks of the Padres' minor league system, collecting 25 saves in his first two years of professional baseball.

=== Pittsburgh Pirates ===
On July 10, 2001, Camp was dealt to the Pittsburgh Pirates in exchange for outfielder Emil Brown. He continued to advance in the minors, receiving an invitation to the Pirates spring training camp in 2003. Failing to make the major league team, however, Camp was granted free agency by Pittsburgh at the end of the season.

=== Kansas City Royals ===
In 2004, Camp joined the Kansas City Royals organization. Signed by his former college coach and current Royals general manager Dayton Moore, Camp finally made his first major league roster. Camp made his major league debut on Opening Day, April 5. Facing the Chicago White Sox, Camp allowed two runs in two innings of work. He remained a semi-regular contributor to the Royals bullpen that season and in 2005, working primarily in middle and long relief, while shuttling between Kansas City and Triple-A Omaha.

=== Tampa Bay Rays ===
Camp was granted free agency after the 2005 season, and signed with the Tampa Bay Devil Rays on January 17, 2006. From 2006 to 2007 Camp was a mainstay in the Devil Rays' beleaguered bullpen, amassing 75 appearances in 2006, second most in the American League. Control problems hampered Camp's success in Tampa Bay and his final year in Kansas City, however, and the righty struggled to poor ERAs of 6.43, 4.68 and 7.20 respectively from 2005 to 2007. Camp had particular trouble with preventing inherited runners from scoring, allowing over forty percent (22 of 54) of runners on base to reach home in his final season with the Devil Rays.

=== Toronto Blue Jays ===
Camp signed a minor league deal with the Blue Jays prior to the 2008 season. Prepared with a new pitch, a changeup, Camp excelled at Triple-A Syracuse and was recalled by Toronto soon after breaking camp. Limiting right-handed hitters to a paltry .204 batting average, Camp helped the Blue Jays staff to team ERA of 3.49, best in all of Major League Baseball that season. In 2009, Camp led the Blue Jays relievers with a career best 79 2/3 innings pitched, while tallying a career high 58 strikeouts.

=== Seattle Mariners ===
On February 6, 2012, Camp signed a one-year contract with the Seattle Mariners. However, a month later, the Mariners released Camp prior to the start of the season as they were eyeing youth.

=== Chicago Cubs ===
On March 26, 2012, the Chicago Cubs signed Camp to a minor league deal. During the 2012 season, Camp pitched 77 2/3 innings in a league-leading 80 appearances for the Cubs. He accrued a record of 3–6, with two saves and a 3.59 ERA.

On November 19, 2012, Camp and the Cubs agreed to a one-year, $1.35 million contract that includes $200,000 in possible incentives. Camp pitched in 14 games in April, going 1–1 with eight runs allowed in 11 1/3 innings. In five games in May, he gave up six runs in 5 1/3 innings. On May 22, Camp was placed on the disabled list after spraining his toe, and he was replaced by Rafael Dolis. After a rehab assignment in Single-A Kane County, he returned to the Cubs on June 15. In six games in June, he gave up four runs in 6 1/3 innings. He was designated for assignment on July 3, 2013. He was released on July 9. In 26 games with the Cubs in 2013, Camp went 1–1 with a 7.04 ERA and four holds, striking out 13 in 23 innings.

=== Arizona Diamondbacks ===
Camp signed a minor league deal with the Arizona Diamondbacks on July 17, 2013. He was assigned to Triple-A Reno, where he pitched in 17 games to end the season. With the Aces in 2013, he had a 2.42 ERA, striking out 19 in 22 1/3 innings. After the year, he was a minor league free agent.

=== Philadelphia Phillies ===
On November 11, 2013, Camp signed a minor league deal with the Philadelphia Phillies. He was outrighted to the Triple-A Lehigh Valley IronPigs on May 8, 2014. Camp elected free agency the next day. He re-signed on a minor league deal on May 15, 2014, and was released by Lehigh Valley on June 27.

On March 9, 2015, Camp announced his retirement.

=== Pitching style ===
Camp was primarily a sinkerballer, throwing his 87–90 mph sinker about half the time. His other pitches included a slider (78–80) and a changeup (81–83). He tended to start with sinkers early in the at-bat and worked in more sliders later.

== Coaching career ==
On June 26, 2019, Camp was named the pitching coach at his alma mater, George Mason. On July 8, 2022, Bill Brown stepped down as the head coach of the Patriots, and Camp was named the interim head coach.

Record table
Season	Team	Overall	Conference	Standing	Postseason
George Mason Patriots (Atlantic 10 Conference) (2023–present)
2023	George Mason	36–27	13–10	6th	NCAA Regional
2024	George Mason	21–32	7–17	12th	
2025	George Mason	40–21	20–10	2nd	
2026	George Mason	30–26	20–10	4th	Atlantic 10 Tournament
George Mason:		127–106	60–47		
Total:		127–106			
National champion Postseason invitational champion Conference regular season champion Conference regular season and conference tournament champion Division regular season champion Division regular season and conference tournament champion Conference tournament champion
