= Tyler Locklear =

American baseball player (born 2000)

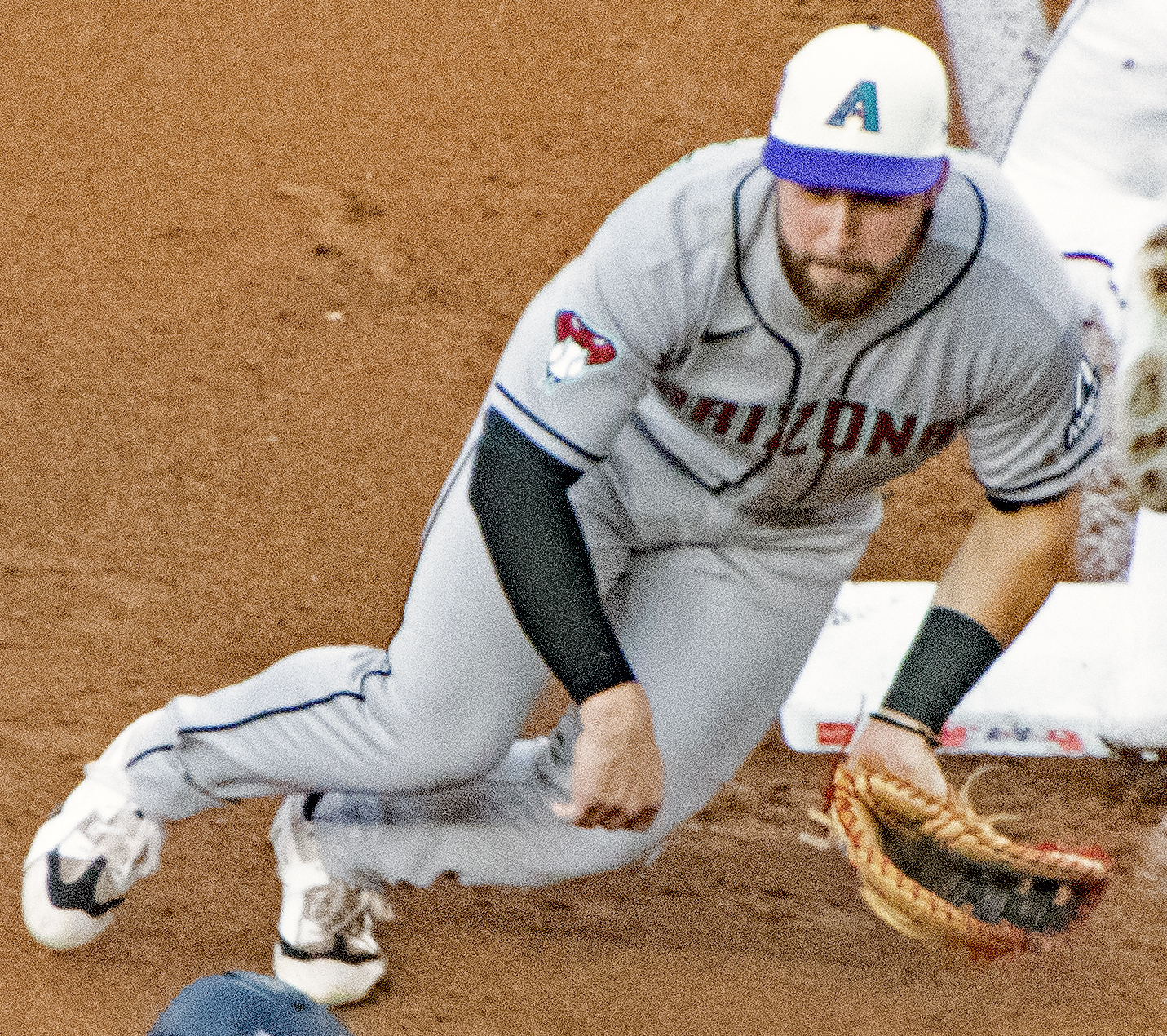
- Locklear with the Arizona Diamondbacks in 2026

Arizona Diamondbacks – No. 31
- First baseman
- Born: November 24, 2000 (age 25); Baltimore, Maryland, U.S.
- Bats: Right Throws: Right

MLB debut
- June 9, 2024, for the Seattle Mariners

MLB statistics (through 2026 season)
- Batting average: .190
- Home runs: 6
- Runs batted in: 15
- Stats at Baseball Reference

Teams
- Seattle Mariners (2024); Arizona Diamondbacks (2025–present)

Tyler Evan Locklear (born November 24, 2000) is an American professional baseball first baseman for the Arizona Diamondbacks of Major League Baseball (MLB). He has previously played in MLB for the Seattle Mariners. Locklear played college baseball for the VCU Rams. He was selected by the Mariners in the second round of the 2022 MLB draft and made his MLB debut in 2024.

== Early life ==
Locklear grew up in Abingdon, Maryland, northeast of Baltimore. He played high school baseball for Archbishop Curley High School in Baltimore. At Archbishop Curley, Locklear was named a 2018 Under Armour All-American and earned All-State honors after hitting .500 in his senior year. Locklear was ranked by Perfect Game as the ninth best prospect in Maryland in 2019.

== College ==
Locklear started for VCU ahead of his freshman season. He appeared in all 15 Rams games in 2020, batting .259 and driving in eight runs and scoring 15 runs. The season prematurely ended in mid-March 2020 due to the COVID-19 pandemic. As a result, Locklear was redshirted and retained four years of collegiate eligibility.

During his 2021 redshirt freshman season, Locklear helped the Rams to a 38–16 record, their best since 2015, an Atlantic 10 regular season and a conference tournament championship, as well as the second seed in the Starkville Regional of the NCAA baseball tournament, their highest seeding in the tournament since 2001. Locklear led the Atlantic 10 in runs (69), RBIs (66), on-base percentage (.515), and walks (46), all marks that rank in the top 10 in VCU history for a single season. Additionally, Locklear hit 16 home runs, a VCU freshman record, the second-most in a season in VCU history, and tied for the conference lead in 2021. Locklear earned three A-10 Rookie of the Week honors.

After his 2021 season, Locklear received many conference and national accolades. He was named to the Atlantic 10 All-Rookie Team, All-Atlantic 10 team, All-State team, ABCA Atlantic All-Region First Team, and was named a freshman All-American by Collegiate Baseball, Baseball America, and the National Collegiate Baseball Writers Association (NWCBA). Locklear earned national All-American honors from Collegiate Baseball (third-team), NCBWA (second-team), Baseball America (second-team), and the American Baseball Coaches Association (first-team). He was also named the best college baseball freshman in Virginia, the Atlantic 10 Rookie of the Year, and the Atlantic 10 Player of the Year.

After the 2021 season, he played collegiate summer baseball with the Orleans Firebirds of the Cape Cod Baseball League. He batted .256, tied for the league lead in home runs and received the league's 10th Player Award, recognizing his work as a teammate and community member.

Ahead of his redshirt sophomore year, Locklear was included on the 55-player preseason watchlist for the Golden Spikes Award. He was also named a preseason All-American by Collegiate Baseball, D1Baseball, and Perfect Game. In 2022, he slashed .402/.542/.799 with 20 home runs and 78 RBIs, while also being hit by 23 pitches. The Rams repeated as Atlantic 10 champs. Locklear was named the best college baseball player in Virginia and named to the All-American second team and Atlantic All-Region first team by ABCA, the All-American third team by Baseball America, and first team all-conference.

== Professional career ==
=== Seattle Mariners ===
The Seattle Mariners selected Locklear in the second round with the 58th overall selection in the 2022 Major League Baseball draft. He signed with the Mariners on July 23 and received a $1.28 million signing bonus. He made his professional debut with rookie–level Arizona Complex League Mariners in 2022. After two games in Arizona, he moved up to the Single-A Modesto Nuts, where he hit .282/.353/.504 in 29 games.

Locklear began 2023 campaign with the High-A Everett AquaSox but was hit by a fastball on June 1, breaking a bone in his right hand. He returned to Everett in August after playing two games with the ACL Mariners and was promoted to the Double-A Arkansas Travelers on August 24. In 85 games for all three teams, he hit .288/.405/.502 with 13 home runs, 52 RBI, and 12 stolen bases. After the regular season, Locklear played for the Peoria Javelinas in the Arizona Fall League, also playing in the 2023 Fall Stars Game. Locklear played first base full time in 2023, after playing third base in college and in part of his first professional season. He began the 2024 season with Arkansas and was promoted to the Triple-A Tacoma Rainiers in late May. In 51 games to start 2024, Locklear hit .293/.404/.520 with nine home runs and 33 RBI.

On June 9, 2024, Locklear was selected to the Mariners' 40-man roster and promoted to the major leagues. In his major-league debut that day against the Kansas City Royals, Locklear recorded his first major league hit, a double that batted in a run. His double left his bat at 100.1 mph and flew 380 feet. Locklear became the first Mariner making his MLB debut to have a go-ahead hit in the seventh inning or later since Mike Wilson on May 10, 2011. Locklear scored his first MLB run on the next play, a single by Josh Rojas. On June 13, Locklear hit his first major league home run off Garrett Crochet of the Chicago White Sox.

Locklear was optioned back to Tacoma on June 24, as Jorge Polanco came off the injured list. Locklear spent another week with the Mariners, being recalled on July 23 as Ty France was designated for assignment before returning to Tacoma on July 30 after the Mariners traded for fellow right-handed first baseman Justin Turner. In 16 games with the Mariners in 2023, Locklear hit .156/.224/.311 with one double and two home runs while striking out in 40 percent of his plate appearances. He was more productive in the minors, batting .272/.382/.468 with 16 home runs and 9 stolen bases in 112 games with Tacoma and Arkansas.

Locklear was optioned to Triple-A Tacoma to begin the 2025 season, where he slashed .316/.401/.542 with 19 home runs, 82 RBI, and 18 stolen bases across 98 games.

=== Arizona Diamondbacks ===
On July 31, 2025, the Mariners traded Locklear, Juan Burgos, and Hunter Cranton to the Arizona Diamondbacks in exchange for Eugenio Suárez. In 31 appearances for the Diamondbacks, he batted .175/.267/.262 with three home runs, six RBI, and three stolen bases. On October 3, it was announced that Locklear would require surgeries to repair a ligament tear in his elbow and a labrum injury in his shoulder.

Locklear made 15 appearances for the Diamondbacks in 2026, batting .278/.357/.444 with one home run, six RBI, and one stolen base. On September 12, 2026, Locklear was placed on the 60–day injured list due to a fractured right thumb, ending his season.

== Personal life ==
Locklear's father Todd Locklear played college baseball at St. Andrews College. Locklear's uncle Jeff Locklear pitched in the minor leagues in the San Francisco Giants and Colorado Rockies systems from 1991 to 1995, reaching as high as High-A. His cousin Gavin Locklear played wide receiver for the NC State Wolfpack, where he is currently a coach.

Locklear is a member of the Lumbee Tribe of North Carolina.
