= Bill Brown (baseball coach) =

American baseball coach (born 1957)

Biographical details
- Born: May 21, 1957 (age 69); Camden, New Jersey, U.S.

Playing career
- 1976: Georgia
- 1977: Allegany
- 1978–1979: George Mason
- Position: Catcher

Coaching career (HC unless noted)
- 1980–1981: George Mason (Asst.)
- 1981-2022: George Mason

Head coaching record
- Overall: 1,083–1,056–7
- Tournaments: NCAA: 1–14

Accomplishments and honors

Awards
- 6× CAA Coach of the Year (1987, 1992, 1993, 2004, 2008, 2009)

Bill Brown (born May 21, 1957) is an American baseball coach. He served as the head baseball coach of the George Mason Patriots from 1982 to 2022.

== Playing career ==
Raised in Vienna, Virginia, Brown helped lead his George C. Marshall High School team to the Virginia State Finals in his senior season of 1975. He then played a single season each at Georgia and Allegany Community College before arriving at George Mason. He played two seasons as a catcher with the Patriots, earning NAIA All-District honors in his junior season.

== Coaching career ==
After his playing days ended, Brown worked in the Mason Athletic Department while he completed his degree, serving as an assistant baseball in the fall of 1981 under new head coach Walt Masterson. Upon Masterson's retirement during the fall 1981 season Brown was elevated to head coach. Under Brown, the Patriots have seen over 60 players go on and play professionally, seven of whom have reached the Majors Leagues. Mason reached seven NCAA Regionals under Brown and claimed three conference championships. Brown was named Colonial Athletic Association Coach of the Year a then record six times before the Patriots moved to the Atlantic 10 Conference beginning with the 2014 season. Brown has been elected to several Halls of Fame including the George C. Marshall HS HOF in 2006, the Washington DC Home Plate Club HOF in 2006 and the inaugural class of The Virginia Baseball Coaches Association (VBCA) HOF in 2022. In July 2022 Brown stepped down as the head coach of the Patriots.

== Head coaching record ==
Below is a table of Brown's records as a collegiate head baseball coach.

Record table
Season	Team	Overall	Conference	Standing	Postseason
George Mason Patriots (ECAC South) (1982–1985)
1982	George Mason	19–24			
1983	George Mason	19–24			
1984	George Mason	21–20			
1985	George Mason	38–23			NCAA Regional
George Mason Patriots (Colonial Athletic Association) (1986–2013)
1986	George Mason	27–20–1	8–10	5th	
1987	George Mason	31–23	9–6	3rd	CAA Tournament (Note: In this season, all of the Colonial Athletic Association's members qualified for its postseason tournament.)
1988	George Mason	34–27–1	8–6	T-2nd	NCAA Regional
1989	George Mason	23–25	3–10	5th	CAA Tournament
1990	George Mason	23–25	6–8	4th	CAA Tournament
1991	George Mason	30–27	4–11	T-5th	CAA Tournament
1992	George Mason	39–18	13–4	1st	NCAA Regional
1993	George Mason	33–15	10–1	1st	NCAA Regional
1994	George Mason	18–32–1	1–16	7th	CAA Tournament
1995	George Mason	31–25	11–7	T-2nd	CAA Tournament
1996	George Mason	25–29	12–9	4th	CAA Tournament
1997	George Mason	29–24	10–11	T-4th	CAA Tournament
1998	George Mason	26–28	8–12	6th	CAA Tournament
1999	George Mason	30–24–1	9–12	4th	CAA Tournament
2000	George Mason	21–34–1	7–14	T-7th	CAA Tournament
2001	George Mason	21–32	5–15	8th	CAA Tournament (Note: In this season, all eligible members of the Colonial Athletic Association qualified for the postseason tournament.)
2002	George Mason	28–29	7–4	T-2nd (Colonial)	CAA Tournament
2003	George Mason	31–20	9–8	3rd (Colonial)	CAA Tournament
2004	George Mason	39–19	20–4	1st	NCAA Regional
2005	George Mason	35–19	15–9	2nd	CAA Tournament
2006	George Mason	20–31	12–18	T-7th	
2007	George Mason	27–27	14–14	T-5th	CAA Tournament
2008	George Mason	30–25	18–10	3rd	CAA Tournament
2009	George Mason	42–14	19–5	1st	NCAA Regional
2010	George Mason	28–22	11–13	T-5th	
2011	George Mason	21–32–1	7–23	11th	
2012	George Mason	33–24	16–14	4th	CAA tournament
2013	George Mason	18–35	7–20	10th	
:			279–282		
George Mason Patriots (Atlantic 10 Conference) (2014–2022)
2014	George Mason	34–22	16–9	3rd	NCAA Regional
2015	George Mason	23–27	12–2	T-8th	
2016	George Mason	19–35	7–17	12th	
2017	George Mason	26–33	13–11	7th	Atlantic 10 tournament
2018	George Mason	29–27	16–8	T-2nd	Atlantic 10 tournament
2019	George Mason	19–35	5–19	12th	
2020	George Mason	1–14	0–0		Season canceled due to COVID-19
2021	George Mason	14–29	7–14	7th (South)	
2022	George Mason	23–33	13–11	5th	Atlantic 10 tournament
:		1,083–1,056–7	89–91		
Total:		1,083–1,056–7			
National champion Postseason invitational champion Conference regular season champion Conference regular season and conference tournament champion Division regular season champion Division regular season and conference tournament champion Conference tournament champion
