= Bill Masse =

American baseball player (born 1966)

Medal record

Baseball

Representing the United States

Olympic Games
Gold medal – first place	1988 Seoul	Team competition

William Arthur Masse (born July 6, 1966) is an American former professional baseball outfielder who competed for the United States national baseball team in the 1988 Summer Olympics.

A native of Manchester, Connecticut, Masse attended Davidson College and Wake Forest University. From 1985 to 1987, he played collegiate summer baseball with the Cotuit Kettleers of the Cape Cod Baseball League and was named a league all-star in 1985 and 1987.

The New York Yankees drafted Masse in the seventh round of the 1988 Major League Baseball draft. After his retirement as a player, he served as a minor league baseball manager.

In 1998, Masse was cast as the character of Mike Robinson in Kevin Costner’s “For the Love of the Game.”
