= T. Henry Wilson Jr. Field =

Baseball venue in Davidson, North Carolina

- Wilson Field
- Interactive map of T. Henry Wilson Jr. Field
- Former names: Wildcat Park
- Location: 202 Martin Court Drive, Davidson, NC, USA
- Coordinates: 35.503753°N 80.841208°W
- Owner: Davidson College
- Capacity: 700
- Surface: Natural grass
- Scoreboard: Electronic
- Field size: 320 ft. (LF), 385 (CF), 325 ft. (RF)

Construction
- Opened: March 19, 1967
- Renovated: 2003, 2005, 2009

Tenant
- Davidson Wildcats baseball (2001–present)

T. Henry Wilson Jr. Field is a baseball venue located in Davidson, North Carolina, United States. It is home to the Davidson Wildcats baseball team, a member of the Division I Atlantic-10 Conference. It has a capacity of 700 spectators.

The field opened in 1967 as Wildcat Park, with the first game being held on March 19, 1967. On March 19, 2005, the venue was renamed after T. Henry Wilson Jr., class of 1951. Wilson played both baseball and football at Davidson, and a donation by his family made significant renovations to the field possible.

In 2003, lights were installed at the facility, allowing the first night games to be played at then-Wildcat Park. In 2005, after a donation from the Wilson family, new bleachers, infield, concession stands, and a press box were added. In 2009, an indoor practice facility outside the field was completed.

== See also ==
- List of NCAA Division I baseball venues
