= Saint Louis Billikens baseball =

- 2026 Saint Louis Billikens baseball team
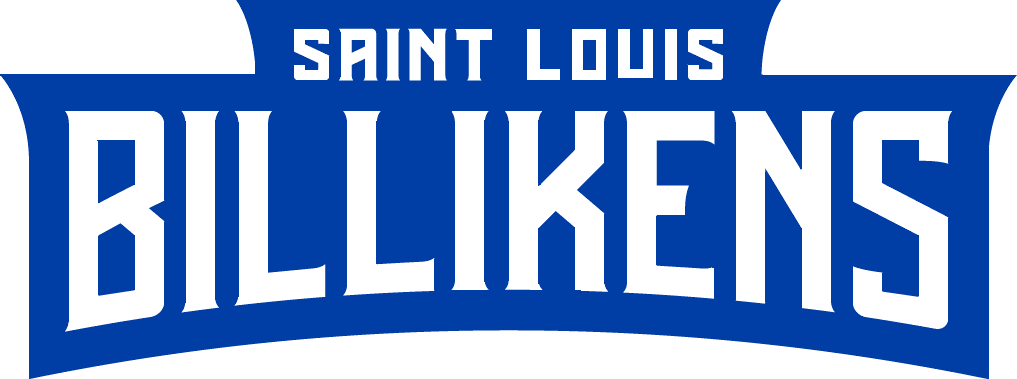
- University: Saint Louis University
- Head coach: Miles Miller (interim) (1st season)
- Conference: Atlantic 10
- Location: St. Louis, Missouri
- Home stadium: Billiken Sports Center (Capacity: 500)
- Nickname: Billikens
- Colors: SLU blue and white

College World Series appearances
- 1965

NCAA tournament appearances
- 1963, 1964, 1965, 1966, 2006, 2010, 2013, 2018

Conference tournament champions
- 2006, 2010, 2013, 2018

Conference regular season champions
- 2012, 2013, 2014, 2015, 2018, 2024

The Saint Louis Billikens baseball team is a varsity intercollegiate athletic team of Saint Louis University in St. Louis, Missouri, United States. The team is a member of the Atlantic 10 Conference, which is part of the National Collegiate Athletic Association's Division I. The team plays its home games at Billiken Sports Center in St. Louis, Missouri. The Billikens are led by interim head coach Miles Miller.

== Saint Louis in the NCAA Tournament ==
Year	Record	Pct	Notes
1963	1–2	.333	District 5
1964	0–2	.000	District 5
1964	4–2	.667	College World Series 3rd place, District 5 Champions
1966	0–2	.000	District 5
2006	0–2	.000	Fullerton Regional
2010	0–2	.000	Louisville Regional
2013	0–2	.000	Columbia Regional
2018	0–2	.000	Oxford Regional
TOTALS	5–16	.238	

== Notable players ==
- Dan Dugan
- Bob Habenicht
- Joe Murphy
- James Norwood
- Bradbury Robinson
- Harry Sullivan

== See also ==
- List of NCAA Division I baseball programs
