= 2026 VCU Rams baseball team =

American college baseball season

2026 VCU Rams baseball

Atlantic 10 tournament champions

NCAA Chapel Hill Regional, 1–2
- Conference: Atlantic 10 Conference
- Record: 38–25 (20–10 A-10)
- Head coach: Sean Thompson (2nd season)
- Assistant coaches: Andrew Llewellyn (6th season); Campbell Ellis (1st season)
- Hitting coach: Chris O'Neill (2nd season)
- Pitching coach: JoJo Howie (2nd season)
- Home stadium: The Diamond

2026 Atlantic 10 Conference baseball standings
	Conf.						Overall
Team	W		L		T	PCT	W		L		T	PCT
Saint Joseph's ‍†‍‍	25	–	5	–	0	.833	35	–	18	–	0	.660
Richmond ‍‍‍	20	–	10	–	0	.667	33	–	22	–	0	.600
VCU ‍‍‡‍^{y}	20	–	10	–	0	.667	37	–	23	–	0	.617
George Mason ‍‍‍	18	–	12	–	0	.600	28	–	24	–	0	.538
Davidson ‍‍‍	16	–	14	–	0	.533	25	–	26	–	0	.490
Rhode Island ‍‍‍	16	–	14	–	0	.533	23	–	29	–	0	.442
Dayton ‍‍‍	15	–	15	–	0	.500	31	–	23	–	0	.574
Fordham ‍‍‍	15	–	15	–	0	.500	25	–	30	–	0	.455
Saint Louis ‍‍‍	11	–	19	–	0	.367	20	–	34	–	0	.370
George Washington ‍‍‍	9	–	21	–	0	.300	18	–	35	–	0	.340
La Salle ‍‍‍	8	–	22	–	0	.267	24	–	31	–	0	.436
St. Bonaventure ‍‍‍	7	–	23	–	0	.233	13	–	36	–	1	.270
† – Conference champion ‡ – Tournament champion y – Invited to the NCAA tournament As of May 17, 2026; Rankings from D1Baseball

The 2026 VCU Rams baseball team represented Virginia Commonwealth University during the 2026 NCAA Division I baseball season. The Rams played home games at The Diamond as a member of the Atlantic 10 Conference. They will be led by second-year head coach Sean Thompson.

This was to be VCU's first season at CarMax Park, but in December 2025, a disagreement between the university and the Richmond Flying Squirrels saw the program remain at The Diamond for the foreseeable future. Originally, the Rams were going to play at the Diamond for February and March home games and then at CarMax Park for April and May home games.

After a season absense, VCU won the 2026 Atlantic 10 Conference baseball tournament and qualified for the NCAA Division I baseball tournament for the first time since 2024. There, the Rams played in the Chapel Hill Regional, where they defeated Tennessee but lost to East Carolina and North Carolina.

== Previous season ==
The Rams are coming off a 17–37 (10–20) season, which was Sean Thompson's first season managing the program. They will be looking to return to both the Atlantic 10 Conference baseball tournament and the NCAA Division I baseball tournament. Sean Thompson's entire coaching staff will be returning, along with the addition of Campbell Ellis who will join as the Director of Pitching Development.

== Preseason ==
=== Preseason Atlantic 10 awards and honors ===
Preseason awards will be announced in February 2026.

Preseason All-Atlantic 10 Team
Player	No.	Position	Team	Class

=== Coaches poll ===
The coaches poll was released on February 13, 2026. VCU was selected to finish eighth.

Coaches' Poll
Predicted finish	Team	Points
1	Rhode Island	136 (5)
2	George Mason	122 (4)
T−3	Saint Joseph's	98 (1)
T−3	Saint Louis	98
T−5	Dayton	83 (1)
T−5	Richmond	83
7	Davidson	77
8	VCU	71 (1)
9	George Washington	68
10	Fordham	56
11	St. Bonaventure	24
12	La Salle	20

== Personnel ==
=== Starters ===
Lineup
Pos.	No.	Player.	Year
C	11	Teige Lethert	Graduate
1B	3	Nate Kirkpatrick	Junior
2B	24	Alec Warden	RS Freshman
3B	6	Nick Flores	Sophomore
SS	8	Dante DeFranco	Graduate
LF	10	Ethan Acevedo	Junior
CF	1	Michael Petite	Junior
RF	9	Trent Adelman	Junior
DH	37	Jacob Lee	Sophomore

Weekend pitching rotation
Day	No.	Player.	Year
Friday	25	Hunter Gotschall	Junior
Saturday	35	Patrick Steitz	RS Senior
Sunday	19	Nick Frers	Junior

=== Roster ===
2026 VCU Rams baseball team
Players
Coaches

#	Pos.	Name	B/T	Height	Weight	Year	Home town
1	OF	Michael Petite	R/R	6 ft 0 in (1.83 m)	200 lb (91 kg)	Jr	Melbourne, FL
2	INF	Brendan Horne	R/R	5 ft 11 in (1.8 m)	175 lb (79 kg)	Fr	Hooksett, NH
3	INF	Nate Kirkpatrick	R/R	6 ft 1 in (1.85 m)	215 lb (98 kg)	Jr	Surrey, BC
4	INF	Cade Tousa	L/R	5 ft 11 in (1.8 m)	175 lb (79 kg)	Jr	Saline, MI
6	INF	Nick Flores	R/R	5 ft 9 in (1.75 m)	185 lb (84 kg)	So	Royersford, PA
8	UTL	Dante DeFranco	R/R	5 ft 10 in (1.78 m)	180 lb (82 kg)	Gr	Hillsborough, NC
9	OF	Trent Adelman	R/R	6 ft 1 in (1.85 m)	200 lb (91 kg)	Jr	Darnestown, MD
10	OF	Ethan Acevedo	L/L	5 ft 8 in (1.73 m)	180 lb (82 kg)	Jr	Monroe, NY
11	C	Teige Lethert	L/R	6 ft 4 in (1.93 m)	220 lb (100 kg)	Gr	Woodbury, MN
12	UTL	Brody Leyboldt	L/L	6 ft 1 in (1.85 m)	180 lb (82 kg)	Jr	Omaha, NE
14	RHP	Everett Vaughan	R/R	6 ft 3 in (1.91 m)	200 lb (91 kg)	Gr	Moseley, VA
15	RHP	Cooper Campbell	R/R	6 ft 2 in (1.88 m)	160 lb (73 kg)	So	Lynchburg, VA
16	LHP	Boyce Read	L/L	6 ft 0 in (1.83 m)	185 lb (84 kg)	Fr	Rogers, AR
17	INF	Rex Smith	L/R	6 ft 1 in (1.85 m)	200 lb (91 kg)	Jr	Sarasota, FL
19	RHP	Nick Frers	R/R	6 ft 3 in (1.91 m)	225 lb (102 kg)	Jr	North Vancouver, BC
21	RHP	Caleb Clover	R/R	6 ft 2 in (1.88 m)	190 lb (86 kg)	Jr	Bradenton, FL
22	RHP	Chase Nystrom	R/R	6 ft 1 in (1.85 m)	180 lb (82 kg)	Fr	Trinity, FL
23	RHP	Riley Roarty	L/R	6 ft 5 in (1.96 m)	195 lb (88 kg)	So	Midlothian, VA
24	INF	Alec Warden	R/R	6 ft 2 in (1.88 m)	185 lb (84 kg)	RS Fr	Pittsburgh, PA
25	RHP	Hunter Gotschall	R/R	6 ft 0 in (1.83 m)	200 lb (91 kg)	Jr	Peyton, CO
26	RHP	Cooper Weygandt	R/R	6 ft 1 in (1.85 m)	200 lb (91 kg)	Jr	Beaverton, OR
27	RHP	Anthony Roszko	R/R	6 ft 4 in (1.93 m)	230 lb (104 kg)	Jr	Chesapeake, VA
28	C	Graham Hylton	R/L	6 ft 1 in (1.85 m)	195 lb (88 kg)	Jr	Mustang, OK
29	RHP	Coleman Bobb	R/R	6 ft 3 in (1.91 m)	250 lb (113 kg)	Jr	Benson, UT
31	UTL	Quinn Maher	L/R	6 ft 2 in (1.88 m)	220 lb (100 kg)	Jr	Colorado Springs, CO
32	LHP	Dawson Newman	R/L	6 ft 2 in (1.88 m)	190 lb (86 kg)	So	Great Bridge, VA
33	LHP	Bryce Carter	L/L	6 ft 3 in (1.91 m)	235 lb (107 kg)	Jr	Sanford, FL
35	RHP	Patrick Steitz	R/R	6 ft 8 in (2.03 m)	210 lb (95 kg)	Sr	Peoria, AZ
37	C	Jacob Lee	R/R	6 ft 2 in (1.88 m)	205 lb (93 kg)	So	Chesterfield, VA
38	RHP	Fenix DiGiacomo	R/R	6 ft 5 in (1.96 m)	240 lb (109 kg)	Gr	Spotsylvania, VA
39	RHP	Zach Peters	R/R	6 ft 3 in (1.91 m)	200 lb (91 kg)	Sr	North Haven, CT
41	RHP	Nick Bertrand	R/R	6 ft 0 in (1.83 m)	180 lb (82 kg)	Fr	Seminole, FL
42	RHP	Elias Holbert	R/R	6 ft 3 in (1.91 m)	240 lb (109 kg)	RS Sr	Sherwood, OR
43	LHP	Cade Dressler	L/L	6 ft 3 in (1.91 m)	215 lb (98 kg)	Gr	Mifflinburg, PA

Head coach

Sean Thompson

Assistant coach(es)

JoJo Howie
Andrew Llewellyn
Chris O'Neill

Legend

- (C) Team captain
- (S) Suspended
- (I) Ineligible
- Injured
- Current redshirt

Roster
Last update: January 3, 2026

=== Coaching staff ===
2026 VCU Rams baseball coaching staff
Name	Position	Seasons at VCU	Alma mater
Sean Thompson	Head coach	3	Virginia Commonwealth University (2018)
JoJo Howie	Assistant coach	2	Virginia Commonwealth University (2015)
Andrew Llewellyn	Assistant coach	6	Wingate University (2020)
Chris O'Neill	Pitching coach	2	King's College (NC) (2012)

== Offseason ==
=== Departures ===
Offseason departures
Name	No.	Pos.	Height	Weight	Year	Hometown	Notes
Seth Werchan	8	OF	6 ft 3 in (1.91 m)	205 pounds (93 kg)	Graduate	Austin, TX	Graduated
Cato Kleinman	11	INF	5 ft 9 in (1.75 m)	170 pounds (77 kg)	Senior	Westlake Village, CA	Graduated
Casey Kleinman	13	C	5 ft 9 in (1.75 m)	170 pounds (77 kg)	Senior	Westlake Village, CA	Graduated
Owen Tappy	16	RHP	6 ft 1 in (1.85 m)	185 pounds (84 kg)	Graduate	Charlotte, NC	Graduated
Miles Garrett	18	RHP	5 ft 10 in (1.78 m)	170 pounds (77 kg)	Graduate	Stone Mountain, GA	Graduated
James McGrady	24	RHP	5 ft 11 in (1.80 m)	190 pounds (86 kg)	Senior	Norfolk, VA	Graduated
Will Henson	27	INF	6 ft 2 in (1.88 m)	185 pounds (84 kg)	Senior	Chicago, IL	Graduated
Carter Richey	28	INF	5 ft 11 in (1.80 m)	205 pounds (93 kg)	Senior	Chandler, AZ	Graduated
Max Moore	29	LHP	6 ft 4 in (1.93 m)	255 pounds (116 kg)	Graduate	Richmond, VA	Graduated
Kannon Kleine	30	C	5 ft 11 in (1.80 m)	200 pounds (91 kg)	RS Sophomore	Galesburg, IL	Did not return
Brian Yetter	31	RHP	6 ft 1 in (1.85 m)	215 pounds (98 kg)	Graduate	McVeytown, PA	Graduated
Drew Ramos	32	RHP	6 ft 2 in (1.88 m)	210 pounds (95 kg)	Graduate	Williamsburg, VA	Graduated
Broden Palmer	33	RHP	6 ft 4 in (1.93 m)	225 pounds (102 kg)	Sophomore	Kennewick, WA	Did not return
Jack Goleski	38	LHP	6 ft 3 in (1.91 m)	195 pounds (88 kg)	Senior	Mechanicsville, VA	Graduated
Danny Estrada	41	OF	5 ft 8 in (1.73 m)	185 pounds (84 kg)	Senior	West Lawn, PA	Graduated
Jack Hoeymans	45	RHP	6 ft 3 in (1.91 m)	215 pounds (98 kg)	RS Senior	McLean, VA	Graduated
Justin Humenay	50	RHP	6 ft 0 in (1.83 m)	195 pounds (88 kg)	Graduate	Montreal, QC	Graduated
Sean Swenson	55	INF	6 ft 3 in (1.91 m)	220 pounds (100 kg)	Graduate	Indianapolis, IN	Graduated

==== Outgoing transfers ====
Outgoing transfers
Name	Number	Pos.	Height	Weight	Hometown	Year	New school	Source
Adrian Jimenez	1	INF	5 ft 10 in (1.78 m)	175 pounds (79 kg)	Lilburn, GA	Freshman	Charlotte	
Nick April-Gath	4	INF	6 ft 1 in (1.85 m)	170 pounds (77 kg)	Valrico, FL	Freshman	Florida Southwestern	
Elijah Coston	10	INF/LHP	6 ft 3 in (1.91 m)	185 pounds (84 kg)	Chester, VA	Freshman	Florida Southwestern	
Will Epstein	12	OF	6 ft 2 in (1.88 m)	190 pounds (86 kg)	Chapel Hill, NC	Sophomore	Pitt (NC)	
Spencer Sullivan	17	OF/1B	6 ft 1 in (1.85 m)	200 pounds (91 kg)	West Linn, OR	Junior	LSU–Shreveport	
Brian Goglia	21	RHP	6 ft 3 in (1.91 m)	175 pounds (79 kg)	Milford, CT	Freshman	Eastern Connecticut	
Colby Motley	22	INF/OF	6 ft 3 in (1.91 m)	218 pounds (99 kg)	Williamsburg, VA	Freshman	Wallace	
Joe Gomez	35	RHP	5 ft 10 in (1.78 m)	180 pounds (82 kg)	Palmyra, VA	RS Freshman	Longwood	
Brayden McCollough	44	RHP	6 ft 7 in (2.01 m)	255 pounds (116 kg)	Centennial, CO	Junior	Metro State Denver	

==== 2025 MLB draft ====
No players were selected in the 2025 MLB draft.

=== Acquisitions ===
==== Incoming transfers ====
Incoming transfers
Name	No.	Pos.	Height	Weight	Hometown	Year	Previous school	Source
Michael Petite	1	OF	6 ft 0 in (1.83 m)	200 pounds (91 kg)	Melbourne, FL	Junior	Miami Dade	
Cade Tousa	4	INF	5 ft 11 in (1.80 m)	175 pounds (79 kg)	Saline, MI	Junior	Iowa Western	
Dante DeFranco	8	UTL	5 ft 10 in (1.78 m)	180 pounds (82 kg)	Hillsborough, NC	Graduate	Charlotte	
Ethan Acevedo	10	OF	5 ft 8 in (1.73 m)	180 pounds (82 kg)	Monroe, NY	Junior	Indian Hills	
Teige Lethert	11	C	6 ft 4 in (1.93 m)	220 pounds (100 kg)	Woodbury, MN	Graduate	Milwaukee	
Brody Leyboldt	12	OF	6 ft 1 in (1.85 m)	180 pounds (82 kg)	Omaha, NE	Junior	Iowa Western	
Rex Smith	17	INF	6 ft 1 in (1.85 m)	200 pounds (91 kg)	Sarasota, FL	Junior	SCF–Sarasota	
Caleb Clover	21	RHP	6 ft 2 in (1.88 m)	190 pounds (86 kg)	Bradenton, FL	Junior	Hillsborough	
Alec Warden	24	SS	6 ft 2 in (1.88 m)	185 pounds (84 kg)	Pittsburgh, PA	RS Freshman	Penn State	
Hunter Gotschall	25	RHP	6 ft 0 in (1.83 m)	200 pounds (91 kg)	Peyton, CO	Junior	Salt Lake	
Cooper Weygandt	26	RHP	6 ft 1 in (1.85 m)	200 pounds (91 kg)	Beaverton, OR	Junior	Pierce (WA)	
Anthony Roszko	27	RHP	6 ft 4 in (1.93 m)	230 pounds (100 kg)	Chesapeake, VA	Junior	Virginia Wesleyan	
Graham Hylton	28	C	6 ft 1 in (1.85 m)	195 pounds (88 kg)	Mustang, OK	Junior	Northern Oklahoma	
Coleman Bobb	29	RHP	6 ft 3 in (1.91 m)	250 pounds (110 kg)	Benson, UT	Junior	Southern Idaho	
Quinn Maher	31	UTL	6 ft 2 in (1.88 m)	220 pounds (100 kg)	Colorado Springs, CO	Junior	Hutchinson	
Dawson Newman	32	LHP	6 ft 2 in (1.88 m)	190 pounds (86 kg)	Great Bridge, VA	Sophomore	Coastal Carolina	
Bryce Carter	33	LHP	6 ft 3 in (1.91 m)	235 pounds (107 kg)	Sanford, FL	Junior	Eastern Florida State	
Patrick Steitz	35	RHP	6 ft 8 in (2.03 m)	210 pounds (95 kg)	Peoria, AZ	Senior	Kansas	
Fenix DiGiacomo	38	RHP	6 ft 5 in (1.96 m)	240 pounds (110 kg)	Spotsylvania, VA	Graduate	Marshall	
Elias Holbert	42	RHP	6 ft 3 in (1.91 m)	240 pounds (110 kg)	Sherwood, OR	RS Senior	Coastal Carolina	

==== Incoming recruits ====
2025 VCU Recruits
Name	Number	B/T	Pos.	Height	Weight	Hometown	High School	Source
Brendan Horne	2	R/R	INF	5 ft 11 in (1.80 m)	175 pounds (79 kg)	Hooksett, NH	Pinkerton	
Boyce Read	16	L/L	OF/LHP	6 ft 0 in (1.83 m)	185 pounds (84 kg)	Rogers, AR	Bentonville	
Chase Nystrom	22	R/R	OF/RHP	6 ft 1 in (1.85 m)	180 pounds (82 kg)	Trinity, FL	A3 Academy	
Nick Bertrand	41	R/R	OF/RHP	6 ft 0 in (1.83 m)	180 pounds (82 kg)	Seminole, FL	Northside Christian (SC)	

== Game log ==
2026 VCU Rams baseball game log (38–25)
Regular season: 32–22 (Home: 21–7; Away: 10–14; Neutral: 1–1)

February: 4–6 (Home: 3–0; Away: 0–5; Neutral: 1–1)
Date	TV	Opponent	Rank	Stadium	Score	Win	Loss	Save	Attendance	Overall	A-10
February 13	ESPN+	Holy Cross*		The Diamond; Richmond, VA	**W** 2–1	**Peters** (1–0)	Lenahan (0–1)	None	124	1–0	—
February 14 (Note: Part of a doubleheader.)		Holy Cross*		The Diamond	**W** 14–1^{7}	**Gotschall** (1–0)	Volz (0–1)	None	214	2–0	—
February 14		Holy Cross*		The Diamond	**W** 19–7	**Stietz** (1–0)	Leon (0–1)	None	214	3–0	—
Baseball at the Beach
February 20		vs. Illinois*		Springs Brooks Stadium; Conway, SC	**L** 4–9	Plumley (1–1)	**Glover** (0–1)	None	2,039	3–1	—
February 20	ESPN+	at No. 6 Coastal Carolina*		Springs Brooks Stadium	**L** 2–13^{8}	Bosch (1–0)	**Weygendt** (0–1)	None	4,011	3–2	—
February 21		vs. Illinois*		Springs Brooks Stadium	**W** 3–2	**Stietz** (2–0)	Flinn (0–1)	**Newman** (1)	2,267	4–2	—
February 22	ESPN+	at No. 6 Coastal Carolina*		Springs Brooks Stadium	**L** 3–6	Horn (2–0)	**Gotschall** (1–1)	None	2,623	4–3	—
February 25	ACCNX	at No. 8 North Carolina*		Boshamer Stadium; Chapel Hill, NC	**L** 3–13^{7}	Rose (1–0)	**DiGiacomo** (0–1)	None	2,438	4–4	—
February 27	ACCNX	at No. 22 Virginia*		Davenport Field; Charlottesville, VA	**L** 3–5	Zatkowski (1–0)	**Peters** (1–1)	Kapa (1)	3,358	4–5	—
February 28	ACCNX	at No. 22 Virginia*		Davenport Field	**L** 6–7^{11}	Kapa (1–1)	**Campbell** (0–1)	None	3,859	4–6	—

March: 13–5 (Home: 11–3; Away: 2–2; Neutral: 0–0)
Date	TV	Opponent	Rank	Stadium	Score	Win	Loss	Save	Attendance	Overall	A-10
March 1	ESPN+	No. 22 Virginia*		The Diamond	**L** 3–5	Paone (1–0)	**DiGiacomo** (0–2)	None	1,413	4–7	—
March 3	ESPN+	William & Mary*		The Diamond	**W** 9–2	**Gotschall** (2–1)	Calveric (0–1)	None	152	5–7	—
March 4	ESPN+	Old Dominion*		The Diamond	**L** 10–12	Matela (1–0)	**Newman** (0–1)	None	167	5–8	—
March 6	ESPN+	Army*		The Diamond	**W** 4–3^{10}	**Leyboldt** (1–0)	Penswick (0–3)	None	198	6–8	—
March 7	ESPN+	Army*		The Diamond	**W** 11–3	**Steitz** (3–0)	Reavy (0–2)	**Vaughan** (1)	651	7–8	—
March 8	ESPN+	Army*		The Diamond	**W** 11–3	**Holbert** (1–0)	Ramirez (1–1)	None	396	8–8	—
March 13	ESPN+	La Salle		CarMax Park	**W** 6–2	**Frers** (1–0)	Brown (0–2)	**Newman** (2)	184	9–8	1–0
March 14	ESPN+	La Salle		The Diamond	**W** 4–3	**Peters** (2–0)	Shay (1–1)	None	437	10–8	2–0
March 15	ESPN+	La Salle		The Diamond	**W** 8–4	**Campbell** (1–1)	Beck (1–1)	None	419	11–8	3–0
March 17		at Virginia Tech*		English Field; Blacksburg, VA	**L** 8–11	Roe (2–0)	**Nystrom** (0–1)	Crowl (3)	633	11–9	—
March 20		at Dayton		Woerner Field; Dayton, OH	**W** 17–7	**Holbert** (2–0)	Jensen (2–2)	None	232	12–9	4–0
March 21		at Dayton		Woerner Field	**W** 5–2^{10}	**Peters** (3–1)	McNabb (2–1)	**Campbell** (1)	227	13–9	5–0
March 22		at Dayton		Woerner Field	**L** 12–14	Malecha (1–0)	**Frers** (1–1)	Fortes (2)	212	13–10	5–1
March 24	ESPN+	Norfolk State*		The Diamond	**L** 3–5	Mitchell (1–1)	**Leyboldt** (1–1)	Samboy (3)	216	13–11	—
March 27	ESPN+	St. Bonaventure		The Diamond	**W** 4–2	**Newman** (1–1)	James (0–4)	**Peters** (1)	171	14–11	6–1
March 28	ESPN+	St. Bonaventure		The Diamond	**W** 13–3	**Steitz** (4–0)	Feidt (2–3)	**Dressler** (1)	410	15–11	7–1
March 29	ESPN+	St. Bonaventure		The Diamond	**W** 6–5	**Vaughan** (1–0)	Paulino (2–5)	**Peters** (2)	380	16–11	8–1
March 31	ESPN+	Longwood*		The Diamond	**W** 6–1	**Weygandt** (1–0)	Hoover (2–3)	None	308	17–11	—

April: 6–10 (Home: 1–4; Away: 5–6; Neutral: 0–0)
Date	TV	Opponent	Rank	Stadium	Score	Win	Loss	Save	Attendance	Overall	A-10
April 3	ESPN+	at Rhode Island		Bill Beck Field; Kingston, RI	**L** 1–5	Sabbath (2–4)	**Gotschall** (2–2)	Houchens (2)	116	17–12	8–2
April 4	ESPN+	at Rhode Island		Bill Beck Field	**L** 2–4	Cullen (2–3)	**Steitz** (4–1)	Santos (2)	112	17–13	8–3
April 5	ESPN+	at Rhode Island		Bill Beck Field	**L** 5–7^{10}	Lavigueur (2–0)	**Leyboldt** (1–2)	None	103	17–14	8–4
April 7	ESPN+	at Longwood*		Bolding Stadium; Farmville, VA	**W** 6–4^{10}	**Campbell** (2–1)	Fordham (1–3)	None	433	18–14	—
April 10		at Fordham		Jack Coffey Field; New York City, NY	**W** 5–3	**Newman** (2–1)	Elson (3–4)	**Peters** (3)	217	19–14	9–4
April 11		at Fordham		Jack Coffey Field	**W** 13–1	**Steitz** (5–1)	Dowd (1–3)	None	249	20–14	10–4
April 12		at Fordham		Jack Coffey Field	**W** 7–6	**Vaughan** (2–0)	Hanawalt (1–5)	**Peters** (4)	223	21–14	11–4
April 14	ESPN+	No. 9 Virginia*		The Diamond	**W** 6–2	**Newman** (3–1)	Yeager (0–2)	None	982	22–14	—
April 17	ESPN+	George Washington		The Diamond	**L** 3–4	Haug (2–5)	**Clover** (0–2)	Bruno (3)	226	22–15	11–5
April 18	ESPN+	George Washington		The Diamond	**L** 7–8	Cutler (5–0)	**Steitz** (5–2)	Bruno (4)	211	22–16	11–6
April 19	ESPN+	George Washington		The Diamond	**L** 3–9	Wywoda (2–3)	**Vaughan** (2–1)	Miller (1)	169	22–17	11–7
April 21	ESPN+	Virginia Tech*		The Diamond	**L** 6–8	Robertson (1–0)	**Clover** (0–3)	Roe (1)	384	22–18	—
April 24	MASN2	at Richmond		Malcolm U. Pitt Field; Tuckahoe, VA	**L** 1–2	Topolski (4–3)	**Holbert** (2–1)	Ruggiero (2)	356	22–19	11–8
April 25	ESPN+	at Richmond		Malcolm U. Pitt Field	**L** 4–8	Giordano (10–0)	**Steitz** (5–3)	None	413	22–20	11–9
April 26	ESPN+	at Richmond		Malcolm U. Pitt Field	**W** 2–1	**Newman** (4–1)	Hinchliffe (3–5)	**Peters** (5)	248	23–20	12–9
April 28		at Old Dominion*		Bud Metheny Ballpark; Norfolk, VA	**L** 6–7	Maddox (1–1)	**Frers** (1–2)	None	260	23–21	—

May: 9–1 (Home: 6–0; Away: 3–1; Neutral: 0–0)
Date	TV	Opponent	Rank	Stadium	Score	Win	Loss	Save	Attendance	Overall	A-10
May 1	ESPN+	Saint Louis		The Diamond	**W** 12–1	**Steitz** (6–3)	Cherico (3–6)	None	237	24–21	13–9
May 1	ESPN+	Saint Louis		The Diamond	**W** 5–1	**Holbert** (3–1)	Georger (1–1)	None	237	25–21	14–9
May 3		Saint Louis	ESPN+	The Diamond	**W** 10–7	**Peters** (4–1)	Earing (2–3)	None	216	26–21	15–9
May 5		at Norfolk State*		Marty L. Miller Field; Norfolk, VA	**W** 14–3^{7}	**Clover** (1–3)	Harrison (0–1)	None	135	27–21	—
May 8	ESPN+	at Saint Joseph's		Smithson Field; Merion Station, PA	**W** 9–6	**Campbell** (3–1)	Greer (3–2)	**Peters** (6)	185	28–21	16–9
May 8	ESPN+	at Saint Joseph's		Smithson Field	**L** 4–6	Speicher (6–0)	**Frers** (1–3)	Gaines (10)	185	28–22	16–10
May 10	ESPN+	at Saint Joseph's		Smithson Field	**W** 19–5^{7}	**Clover** (2–3)	Parise (6–2)	None	301	29–22	17–10
May 14		Davidson		The Diamond	**W** 10–0	**Steitz** (7–3)	Perkins (1–3)	**Campbell** (2)	207	30–22	18–10
May 15	ESPN+	Davidson		The Diamond	**W** 9–7	**Peters** (5–1)	Marenghi (4–2)	None	284	31–22	19–10
May 16	ESPN+	Davidson		The Diamond	**W** 12–9	**Gotschall** (3–1)	Taggart (1–3)	None	255	32–22	20–10

Postseason: 6–3 (Home: 0–0; Away: 0–2; Neutral: 6–1)

Atlantic 10 Tournament: 5–1 (Home: 0–0; Away: 0–0; Neutral: 5–1)
Date	TV	Opponent	Rank	Stadium	Score	Win	Loss	Save	Attendance	Overall	A10T Record	Source
May 20	ESPN+	vs. (6) Davidson	(3)	Capital One Park; Tysons, VA	**W** 7–4	**Peters** (6–1)	Yochum (7–1)	None	603	33–22	1–0	Report
May 21	ESPN+	vs. (2) Richmond	(3)	Capital One Park	**W** 7–4	**Peters** (7–1)	Gay (0–4)	None	809	34–22	2–0	Report
May 22	ESPN+	vs. (5) Rhode Island	(3)	Capital One Park	**L** 4–5	Sabbath (4–5)	**Campbell** (3–2)	None	834	34–23	2–1	Report
May 22	ESPN+	vs. (1) Saint Joseph's	(3)	Capital One Park	**W** 13–3	**Peters** (8–1)	Gaines (3–3)	None	816	35–23	3–1	Report
May 23	ESPN+	vs. (5) Rhode Island	(3)	Capital One Park	**W** 18–16	**Campbell** (4–2)	Santos (2–2)	None	1,045	36–23	4–1	Report
May 24	ESPN+	vs. (5) Rhode Island	(3)	Capital One Park	**W** 9–1	**Newman** (5–1)	Cullen (3–5)	**Campbell** (3)	1,129	37–23	5–1	

NCAA Chapel Hill Regional: 1–2 (Home: 0–0; Away: 0–1; Neutral: 1–1)
Date	TV	Opponent	Rank	Stadium	Score	Win	Loss	Save	Attendance	Overall	NCAAT Record	Source
May 29	ESPN+	at (1) No. 4 North Carolina*	(4)	Boshamer Stadium	**L** 0–8	Lynch (5–4)	**Steitz** (7–4)	None	3,982	37–24	0–1	Report
May 30	ESPN	vs. (2) No. 23 Tennessee*	(4)	Boshamer Stadium	**W** 5–4	**Holbert** (4–1)	Kuhns (5–5)	**Peters** (7)	3,715	38–24	1–1	Report
May 31	ESPN+	vs. (3) East Carolina*	(4)	Boshamer Stadium	**L** 0–10	Rose (4–2)	**Vaughan** (2–2)	None	3,626	38–25	1–2	Report

Legend: = Win = Loss = Canceled
Bold = VCU team member
Rankings are based on the team's current ranking in the D1Baseball poll.

Schedule Notes

== Tournaments ==
=== Atlantic 10 tournament ===
VCU won their fifth Atlantic 10 Conference baseball tournament championship after beating Rhode Island 9–1. Jacob Lee was award the tournament's Most Outstanding Player award.

Atlantic 10 baseball tournament
(1) Saint Joseph's Hawks	(2) Richmond Spiders	(3) VCU Rams	(4) George Mason Patriots	(5) Rhode Island Rams	(6) Davidson Wildcats

Upper round 1	Upper round 2	Upper final	Final
1	Saint Joseph's	9
4	George Mason	8	5	Rhode Island	17
5	Rhode Island	19	5	Rhode Island	5
3	VCU	4
2	Richmond	4
3	VCU	7	3	VCU	7
6	Davidson	4
5	Rhode Island	16
3	VCU	18	9
Lower round 1	Lower round 2	Lower round 3	Lower final
.	1	Saint Joseph's	3
1	Saint Joseph's	14	3	VCU	13
4	George Mason	11	4	George Mason	4
4	George Mason	9	2	Richmond	6
6	Davidson	1

== Rankings ==
Ranking movements Legend: — = Not ranked
	Week																
Poll	Pre	1	2	3	4	5	6	7	8	9	10	11	12	13	14	15	Final
Coaches'	—	—*	—	—	—	—	—	—	—	—	—	—	—	—			
Baseball America	—	—	—	—	—	—	—	—	—	—	—	—	—	—			
NCBWA†	—	—	—	—	—	—	—	—	—	—	—	—	—	—			
D1Baseball	—	—	—	—	—	—	—	—	—	—	—	—	—	—			
Perfect Game	—	—	—	—	—	—	—	—	—	—	—	—	—	—			

† NCBWA ranks 30 teams in their preseason poll, but only ranks 25 teams weekly during the season.
* A new poll was not released for this week, so for comparison purposes, the previous week's ranking is inserted in this week's slot.
