= 2027 VCU Rams baseball team =

American college baseball season

2027 VCU Rams baseball
- Conference: Atlantic 10 Conference
- Record: 0–0 (0–0 A-10)
- Head coach: Sean Thompson (3rd season)
- Assistant coaches: Andrew Llewellyn (7th season); Campbell Ellis (2nd season)
- Hitting coach: Chris O'Neill (3rd season)
- Pitching coach: JoJo Howie (3rd season)
- Home stadium: TBA

2027 Atlantic 10 Conference baseball standings
	Conf.				Overall
Team	W		L	PCT	W		L	PCT
Davidson ‍‍‍	0	–	0	–	0	–	0	–
Dayton ‍‍‍	0	–	0	–	0	–	0	–
Fordham ‍‍‍	0	–	0	–	0	–	0	–
George Mason ‍‍‍	0	–	0	–	0	–	0	–
George Washington ‍‍‍	0	–	0	–	0	–	0	–
La Salle ‍‍‍	0	–	0	–	0	–	0	–
Rhode Island ‍‍‍	0	–	0	–	0	–	0	–
Richmond ‍‍‍	0	–	0	–	0	–	0	–
Saint Joseph's ‍‍‍	0	–	0	–	0	–	0	–
Saint Louis ‍‍‍	0	–	0	–	0	–	0	–
St. Bonaventure ‍‍‍	0	–	0	–	0	–	0	–
VCU ‍‍‍	0	–	0	–	0	–	0	–
† – Conference champion ‡ – Tournament champion y – Invited to the NCAA tournament As of May 17, 2026; Rankings from D1Baseball

The 2027 VCU Rams baseball team will represent Virginia Commonwealth University during the 2027 NCAA Division I baseball season. The Rams will their home games at either The Diamond or at CarMax Park as a member of the Atlantic 10 Conference. They will be led by third-year head coach Sean Thompson.

== Previous season ==
The Rams are coming off a 38–20 (20–10) season, which was Sean Thompson's second season managing the program. There the Rams finished third during the regular season, but went on to win the Atlantic 10 Conference baseball tournament. With the A-10 tournament championship, VCU earned an automatic bid into the 2026 NCAA Division I baseball tournament, where they were the four-seed in the Chapel Hill Regional, playing against East Carolina, North Carolina, and Tennessee. VCU finished in third place in the regional, with a 1–2 record, defeating Tennessee, but losing to East and North Carolina.

== Offseason ==
=== Departures ===
Offseason departures
Name	No.	Pos.	B/T	Height	Weight	Year	Hometown	Notes
Dante DeFranco	8	UTL	R/R	5 ft 10 in (1.78 m)	180 pounds (82 kg)	Gr.	Hillsborough, NC	Graduated
Ethan Acevedo	10	OF	L/L	5 ft 8 in (1.73 m)	180 pounds (82 kg)	Jr.	Monroe, NY	Did not return
Teige Lethert	11	C	L/R	6 ft 3 in (1.91 m)	220 pounds (100 kg)	Gr.	Woodbury, MN	Graduated
Everett Vaughan	14	LHP	R/R	6 ft 3 in (1.91 m)	200 pounds (91 kg)	Gr.	Moseley, VA	Graduated
Boyce Read	16	LHP	L/L	6 ft 0 in (1.83 m)	185 pounds (84 kg)	Fr.	Rogers, AR	Did not return
Anthony Roszko	27	RHP	R/R	6 ft 4 in (1.93 m)	230 pounds (100 kg)	Jr.	Chesapeake, VA	Did not return
Graham Hylton	28	C	R/L	6 ft 1 in (1.85 m)	195 pounds (88 kg)	Jr.	Mustang, OK	Did not return
Patrick Steitz	35	RHP	R/R	6 ft 8 in (2.03 m)	210 pounds (95 kg)	Sr.	Peoria, AZ	Graduated
Fenix DiGiacomo	38	RHP	R/R	6 ft 5 in (1.96 m)	240 pounds (110 kg)	Gr.	Spotsylvania, VA	Graduated
Elias Holbert	42	RHP	R/R	6 ft 3 in (1.91 m)	240 pounds (110 kg)	Sr.	Sherwood, OR	Graduated
Cade Dressler	43	LHP	L/L	6 ft 3 in (1.91 m)	215 pounds (98 kg)	Gr.	Mifflinburg, PA	Graduated

==== Outgoing transfers ====
Outgoing transfers
Name	No.	Pos.	B/T	Height	Weight	Hometown	Year	New school
Brendan Horne	2	INF	R/R	5 ft 11 in (1.80 m)	175 pounds (79 kg)	Hooksett, NH	Fr.	
Cade Tousa	4	INF	R/R	5 ft 11 in (1.80 m)	175 pounds (79 kg)	Saline, MI	Jr.	
Rex Smith	17	INF	L/R	6 ft 1 in (1.85 m)	200 pounds (91 kg)	Sarasota, FL	Jr.	Coastal Carolina
Chase Nystrom	22	RHP	R/R	6 ft 1 in (1.85 m)	180 pounds (82 kg)	Trinity, FL	Fr.	Florida Gulf Coast
Coleman Bobb	29	RHP	R/R	6 ft 3 in (1.91 m)	250 pounds (110 kg)	Benson, UT	Jr.	Bethune–Cookman
Nick Bertrand	41	RHP	R/R	6 ft 0 in (1.83 m)	180 pounds (82 kg)	Seminole, FL	Fr.	Albany

==== 2026 MLB draft ====
2026 MLB draft selections
Round	Pick	Overall pick	Player	Position	MLB team	Source
10	12	295	Zach Peters	P	Miami Marlins	
19	27	580	Michael Petite	OF	Seattle Mariners	

=== Acquisitions ===
==== Incoming transfers ====
Incoming transfers
Name	No.	Pos.	B/T	Height	Weight	Hometown	Year	Previous school
Frank Carney	1	OF	L/R	5 ft 10 in (1.78 m)	190 pounds (86 kg)	San Diego, CA	Gr.	UC Irvine
Michael Malone	4	RHP	R/R	6 ft 1 in (1.85 m)	185 pounds (84 kg)	Lake Worth Beach, FL	Jr.	Indian River State
Drew Downs	10	OF	L/R	6 ft 3 in (1.91 m)	188 pounds (85 kg)	Cary, NC	Jr.	Brunswick CC
Gabe Wilke	11	C	R/R	6 ft 4 in (1.93 m)	200 pounds (91 kg)	Evansville, IN	Jr.	Lincoln Trail
Matt Pagan	14	LHP	L/L	6 ft 1 in (1.85 m)	185 pounds (84 kg)	Boca Raton, FL	Jr.	Santa Fe
Zach Kourous	16	OF	L/R	5 ft 10 in (1.78 m)	190 pounds (86 kg)	Toronto, ON	Gr.	Mercyhurst
Matt Fox	17	SS	R/R	6 ft 4 in (1.93 m)	225 pounds (102 kg)	Huntington Beach, CA	Jr.	Golden West
Calvin Gregory	22	LHP	L/L	5 ft 10 in (1.78 m)	195 pounds (88 kg)	Lake Oswego, OR	So.	Oregon State
Carson Ackermann	27	RHP	R/R	6 ft 3 in (1.91 m)	215 pounds (98 kg)	Woodenville, WA	RS-Jr.	Tacoma CC
Aiden Harris	28	INF	R/R	6 ft 4 in (1.93 m)	235 pounds (107 kg)	Midlothian, VA	Jr.	Virginia
Drew Greenberg	35	RHP	R/R	6 ft 4 in (1.93 m)	200 pounds (91 kg)	Stevenson Ranch, CA	Jr.	Ohlone
Jack Gibson	38	LHP	L/L	6 ft 3 in (1.91 m)	205 pounds (93 kg)	Southern Shores, NC	Sr.	USC Upstate
Tracen Cameron	39	RHP	R/R	6 ft 0 in (1.83 m)	200 pounds (91 kg)	Vero Beach, FL	Sr.	FIU
Wesley Jones	42	RHP	R/R	6 ft 4 in (1.93 m)	230 pounds (100 kg)	Charlotte, NC	Sr.	Charlotte
Felix Schlede	43	RHP	R/R	6 ft 6 in (1.98 m)	240 pounds (110 kg)	Seattle, WA	Gr.	Sam Houston State

==== Incoming recruits ====
2027 VCU Recruits
Name	No.	Pos.	B/T	Height	Weight	Hometown	High School
Braydon Hallman	2	SS	R/R	6 ft 2 in (1.88 m)	200 pounds (91 kg)	Leesville, SC	Batesburg-Leesville
Tristan Lange	8	RHP	R/R	6 ft 4 in (1.93 m)	230 pounds (100 kg)	Roanoke, VA	North Cross
Hank Brown	29	INF	L/R	6 ft 2 in (1.88 m)	210 pounds (95 kg)	Virginia Beach, VA	Cox
BJ McIntyre	41	OF	R/R	6 ft 4 in (1.93 m)	200 pounds (91 kg)	Chesapeake, VA	Grassfield

== Preseason ==
=== Preseason Atlantic 10 awards and honors ===
Preseason awards will be announced in February 2027.

Preseason All-Atlantic 10 Team
Player	No.	Position	Team	Class

=== Coaches poll ===
The coaches poll will be released in February 2027.

Coaches' Poll
Predicted finish	Team	Points

== Personnel ==
=== Starters ===
Lineup
Pos.	No.	Player.	Year
C			
1B			
2B			
3B			
SS			
LF			
CF			
RF			
DH			

Weekend pitching rotation
Day	No.	Player.	Year
Friday			
Saturday			
Sunday			

=== Roster ===
2027 VCU Rams baseball team
Players
Coaches

#	Pos.	Name	B/T	Height	Weight	Year	Home town
1	OF	Frank Carney	L/R	5 ft 10 in (1.78 m)	190 lb (86 kg)	Gr	San Diego, CA
2	INF	Braydon Hallman	R/R	6 ft 2 in (1.88 m)	200 lb (91 kg)	Fr	Leesville, SC
3	INF	Nate Kirkpatrick	R/R	6 ft 1 in (1.85 m)	215 lb (98 kg)	Sr	Surrey, BC
4	RHP	Michael Malone	R/R	6 ft 1 in (1.85 m)	185 lb (84 kg)	Jr	Lake Worth Beach, FL
6	INF	Nick Flores	R/R	5 ft 10 in (1.78 m)	200 lb (91 kg)	So	Royersford, PA
8	RHP	Tristan Lange	R/R	6 ft 4 in (1.93 m)	230 lb (104 kg)	Fr	Roanoke, VA
9	OF	Trent Adelman	R/R	6 ft 1 in (1.85 m)	200 lb (91 kg)	Jr	Darnestown, MD
10	OF	Drew Downs	L/R	6 ft 3 in (1.91 m)	188 lb (85 kg)	Jr	Cary, NC
11	C	Gabe Wilke	R/R	6 ft 4 in (1.93 m)	200 lb (91 kg)	Jr	Evansville, IN
12	UTL	Brody Leyboldt	L/L	6 ft 1 in (1.85 m)	180 lb (82 kg)	Sr	Omaha, NE
14	LHP	Matt Pagan	L/L	6 ft 1 in (1.85 m)	185 lb (84 kg)	Jr	Boca Raton, FL
15	RHP	Cooper Campbell	R/R	6 ft 2 in (1.88 m)	160 lb (73 kg)	Jr	Lynchburg, VA
16	OF	Zach Kourous	L/R	5 ft 10 in (1.78 m)	190 lb (86 kg)	Gr	Toronto, ON
17	INF	Matt Fox	R/R	6 ft 4 in (1.93 m)	225 lb (102 kg)	Jr	Huntington Beach, CA
19	RHP	Nick Frers	R/R	6 ft 3 in (1.91 m)	225 lb (102 kg)	Sr	North Vancouver, BC
21	RHP	Caleb Clover	R/R	6 ft 2 in (1.88 m)	190 lb (86 kg)	Sr	Bradenton, FL
22	LHP	Calvin Gregory	L/L	5 ft 10 in (1.78 m)	195 lb (88 kg)	So	Lake Oswego, OR
23	RHP	Riley Roarty	L/R	6 ft 5 in (1.96 m)	195 lb (88 kg)	Jr	Midlothian, VA
24	INF	Alec Warden	R/R	6 ft 2 in (1.88 m)	185 lb (84 kg)	RS So	Pittsburgh, PA
25	RHP	Hunter Gotschall	R/R	6 ft 0 in (1.83 m)	200 lb (91 kg)	Sr	Peyton, CO
26	RHP	Cooper Weygandt	R/R	6 ft 1 in (1.85 m)	200 lb (91 kg)	Sr	Beaverton, OR
27	UTL	Carson Ackermann	R/R	6 ft 3 in (1.91 m)	215 lb (98 kg)	RS Jr	Woodinville, WA
28	INF	Aiden Harris	R/R	6 ft 4 in (1.93 m)	235 lb (107 kg)	Jr	Midlothian, VA
29	INF	Hank Brown	L/R	6 ft 4 in (1.93 m)	210 lb (95 kg)	Fr	Virginia Beach, VA
31	UTL	Quinn Maher	L/R	6 ft 2 in (1.88 m)	220 lb (100 kg)	RS Sr	Colorado Springs, CO
32	LHP	Dawson Newman	R/L	6 ft 2 in (1.88 m)	190 lb (86 kg)	RS So	Great Bridge, VA
33	LHP	Bryce Carter	L/L	6 ft 4 in (1.93 m)	225 lb (102 kg)	RS Jr	Sanford, FL
35	RHP	Drew Greenberg	R/R	6 ft 4 in (1.93 m)	200 lb (91 kg)	Jr	Stevenson, Ranch, CA
37	C	Jacob Lee	R/R	6 ft 2 in (1.88 m)	205 lb (93 kg)	Jr	Matoaca, VA
38	LHP	Jack Gibson	R/R	6 ft 3 in (1.91 m)	205 lb (93 kg)	Sr	Southern Shores, NC
39	RHP	Tracen Cameron	R/R	6 ft 0 in (1.83 m)	200 lb (91 kg)	Sr	Vero Beach, FL
41	OF	BJ McIntyre	R/R	6 ft 4 in (1.93 m)	200 lb (91 kg)	Fr	Chesapeake, VA
42	RHP	Wesley Jones	R/R	6 ft 4 in (1.93 m)	230 lb (104 kg)	Sr	Charlotte,NC
43	RHP	Felix Schlede	R/R	6 ft 6 in (1.98 m)	240 lb (109 kg)	Gr	Seattle, WA

Head coach

Sean Thompson

Assistant coach(es)

JoJo Howie
Andrew Llewellyn
Chris O'Neill

Legend

- (C) Team captain
- (S) Suspended
- (I) Ineligible
- Injured
- Current redshirt

Roster
Last update: November 20, 2026

=== Coaching staff ===
2027 VCU Rams baseball coaching staff
Name	Position	Seasons at VCU	Alma mater
Sean Thompson	Head coach	4	Virginia Commonwealth University (2018)
JoJo Howie	Assistant coach	3	Virginia Commonwealth University (2015)
Andrew Llewellyn	Assistant coach	7	Wingate University (2020)
Chris O'Neill	Pitching coach	3	King's College (NC) (2012)

== Game log ==
2027 VCU Rams baseball game log (0–0)
Regular season: 0–0 (Home: 0–0; Away: 0–0; Neutral: 0–0)

February: 0–0 (Home: 0–0; Away: 0–0; Neutral: 0–0)
Date	TV	Opponent	Rank	Stadium	Score	Win	Loss	Save	Attendance	Overall	A-10
February 19		Eastern Michigan*		TBD; Richmond, VA							—
February 20		Eastern Michigan*		TBD							—
February 21		Eastern Michigan*		TBD							—
February 24	ACCNX	at North Carolina*		Boshamer Stadium; Chapel Hill, NC							—
February 26		Monmouth*		TBD							—
February 27		Monmouth*		TBD							—
February 28		Monmouth*		TBD							—

March: 0–0 (Home: 0–0; Away: 0–0; Neutral: 0–0)
Date	TV	Opponent	Rank	Stadium	Score	Win	Loss	Save	Attendance	Overall	A-10
March 3		Longwood*		TBD							—
March 5		Rutgers*		TBD							—
March 6		Rutgers*		TBD							—
March 7		Rutgers*		TBD							—
March 9		Notre Dame*		TBD							—
March 10		Notre Dame*		TBD							—
March 12		at Jacksonville State*		Rudy Abbott Field; Jacksonville, AL							—
March 13		at Jacksonville State*		Rudy Abbott Field							—
March 14		at Jacksonville State*		Rudy Abbott Field							—
March 16		Virginia Tech*		TBD							—
March 19		Rhode Island		TBD							
March 20		Rhode Island		TBD							
March 21		Rhode Island		TBD							
March 23		at William & Mary*		Plumeri Park; Williamsburg, VA							—
March 25		at St. Bonaventure		Fred Handler Park; Olean, NY							
March 26		at St. Bonaventure		Fred Handler Park							
March 27		at St. Bonaventure		Fred Handler Park							
March 30		Norfolk State*		TBD							—

April: 0–0 (Home: 0–0; Away: 0–0; Neutral: 0–0)
Date	TV	Opponent	Rank	Stadium	Score	Win	Loss	Save	Attendance	Overall	A-10
April 2		at George Washington		Barcroft Park; Arlington, VA							
April 3		at George Washington		Barcroft Park							
April 4		at George Washington		Barcroft Park							
April 6		at Norfolk State*		Marty L. Miller Field; Norfolk, VA							—
April 9		Saint Joseph's		TBD							
April 10		Saint Joseph's		TBD							
April 11		Saint Joseph's		TBD							
April 13		at Old Dominion*		Bud Metheny Ballpark; Norfolk, VA							—
April 16		at George Mason		Spuhler Field; Fairfax, VA							
April 17		at George Mason		Spuhler Field							
April 18		at George Mason		Spuhler Field							
April 20		at Virginia Tech*		English Field; Blacksburg, VA							—
April 23		Fordham		TBD							
April 24		Fordham		TBD							
April 25		Fordham		TBD							
April 30		at La Salle		Hank DeVincent Field; Philadelphia, PA							

May: 0–0 (Home: 0–0; Away: 0–0; Neutral: 0–0)
Date	TV	Opponent	Rank	Stadium	Score	Win	Loss	Save	Attendance	Overall	A-10
May 1		at La Salle		Hank DeVincent Field							
May 2		at La Salle		Hank DeVincent Field							
May 5	ACCNX	at Virginia*		Disharoon Park; Charlottesville, VA							—
May 7		Dayton		TBD							
May 8		Dayton		TBD							
May 9		Dayton		TBD							
May 11		at Longwood*		Bolding Stadium; Farmville, VA							—
May 14		at Davidson		T. Henry Wilson Jr. Field; Davidson, NC							
May 15		at Davidson		T. Henry Wilson Jr. Field							
May 16		at Davidson		T. Henry Wilson Jr. Field							
May 20		Richmond		TBD							
May 21		Richmond		TBD							
May 22		Richmond		TBD							

Postseason: 0–0 (Home: 0–0; Away: 0–0; Neutral: 0–0)

Atlantic 10 tournament: 0–0 (Home: 0–0; Away: 0–0; Neutral: 0–0)
Date	TV	Opponent	Rank	Stadium	Score	Win	Loss	Save	Attendance	Overall	A10T Record
May 25–30		vs. TBD		Capital One Park; Tysons, VA							

Legend: = Win = Loss = Canceled
Bold = VCU team member
Rankings are based on the team's current ranking in the D1Baseball poll.

Schedule Notes

== Rankings ==
Ranking movements
	Week																
Poll	Pre	1	2	3	4	5	6	7	8	9	10	11	12	13	14	15	Final
Coaches'		*															
Baseball America																	
NCBWA†																	
D1Baseball																	
Perfect Game																	

† NCBWA ranks 30 teams in their preseason poll, but only ranks 25 teams weekly during the season.
* A new poll was not released for this week, so for comparison purposes, the previous week's ranking is inserted in this week's slot.

== Postseason awards and honors ==
2027 All-Atlantic 10 First Team
Player	No.	Position	Class
