= 2026 Saint Joseph's Hawks baseball team =

American college baseball season

2026 Saint Joseph's Hawks baseball
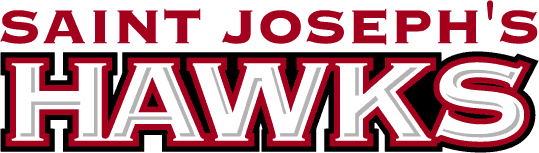

Liberty Bell Classic champions Atlantic 10 regular season champions
- Conference: Atlantic 10 Conference
- Record: 36–20 (25–5 A-10)
- Head coach: Fritz Hamburg (18th season)
- Assistant coach: Lee Saverio (5th season)
- Hitting coach: Doc Neiman (3rd season)
- Pitching coach: Scott Boches (1st season)
- Home stadium: Smithson Field

2026 Atlantic 10 Conference baseball standings
| | Conf. | | | | | | Overall |
| Team | W | | L | | T | PCT | W | | L | | T | PCT |
|---|---|---|---|---|---|---|---|---|---|---|---|---|
| Saint Joseph's ‍†‍‍ | 25 | – | 5 | – | 0 | .833 | 35 | – | 18 | – | 0 | .660 |
| Richmond ‍‍‍ | 20 | – | 10 | – | 0 | .667 | 33 | – | 22 | – | 0 | .600 |
| VCU ‍‍‡‍^{y} | 20 | – | 10 | – | 0 | .667 | 37 | – | 23 | – | 0 | .617 |
| George Mason ‍‍‍ | 18 | – | 12 | – | 0 | .600 | 28 | – | 24 | – | 0 | .538 |
| Davidson ‍‍‍ | 16 | – | 14 | – | 0 | .533 | 25 | – | 26 | – | 0 | .490 |
| Rhode Island ‍‍‍ | 16 | – | 14 | – | 0 | .533 | 23 | – | 29 | – | 0 | .442 |
| Dayton ‍‍‍ | 15 | – | 15 | – | 0 | .500 | 31 | – | 23 | – | 0 | .574 |
| Fordham ‍‍‍ | 15 | – | 15 | – | 0 | .500 | 25 | – | 30 | – | 0 | .455 |
| Saint Louis ‍‍‍ | 11 | – | 19 | – | 0 | .367 | 20 | – | 34 | – | 0 | .370 |
| George Washington ‍‍‍ | 9 | – | 21 | – | 0 | .300 | 18 | – | 35 | – | 0 | .340 |
| La Salle ‍‍‍ | 8 | – | 22 | – | 0 | .267 | 24 | – | 31 | – | 0 | .436 |
| St. Bonaventure ‍‍‍ | 7 | – | 23 | – | 0 | .233 | 13 | – | 36 | – | 1 | .270 |
† – Conference champion ‡ – Tournament champion y – Invited to the NCAA tournament As of May 17, 2026; Rankings from D1Baseball

The 2026 Saint Joseph's Hawks baseball team represented Saint Joseph's University during the 2026 NCAA Division I baseball season. The Hawks played their home games at Smithson Field as a member of the Atlantic 10 Conference. They were led by eighteenth-year head coach Fritz Hamburg.

Saint Joseph's season was highlighted by winning the Liberty Bell Classic as well as the Atlantic 10 regular season. The program went 1–2 in the Atlantic 10 tournament, and was not selected for an at-large berth in the NCAA tournament.

== Previous season ==
The Hawks came off a 24–28 (17–13) season, where they qualified for the 2025 Atlantic 10 Conference baseball tournament as the fifth-overall seed, where they went 0–2.

== Preseason ==
=== Coaches poll ===
The coaches poll was released on February 13, 2026. Saint Joseph's was selected to finish third.

Coaches' Poll
| Predicted finish | Team | Points |
|---|---|---|
| 1 | Rhode Island | 136 (5) |
| 2 | George Mason | 122 (4) |
| T−3 | Saint Joseph's | 98 (1) |
| T−3 | Saint Louis | 98 |
| T−5 | Dayton | 83 (1) |
| T−5 | Richmond | 83 |
| 7 | Davidson | 77 |
| 8 | VCU | 71 (1) |
| 9 | George Washington | 68 |
| 10 | Fordham | 56 |
| 11 | St. Bonaventure | 24 |
| 12 | La Salle | 20 |

== Personnel ==
=== Starters ===
Lineup
| Pos. | No. | Player. | Year |
|---|---|---|---|
| C | 22 | Blake Primrose | Sophomore |
| 1B | 15 | Alex Venezia | Sophomore |
| 2B | 16 | Tim Dickinson | Junior |
| 3B | 31 | Richard Beggy | Graduate |
| SS | 18 | Carson Applegate | RS Junior |
| LF | 9 | Joey Pagano | Senior |
| CF | 1 | Alex Kelsey | Sophomore |
| RF | 13 | Jason Janesko | RS Sophomore |
| DH | 11 | Joey Gale | Junior |

Weekend pitching rotation
| Day | No. | Player. | Year |
|---|---|---|---|
| Friday | 2 | Duke McCarron | Junior |
| Saturday | 27 | Cole Fehrman | Senior |
| Sunday | 14 | Luke Parise | Junior |

=== Coaching staff ===
2026 Saint Joseph's Hawks baseball coaching staff
| Name | Position | Seasons at SJU | Alma mater |
|---|---|---|---|
| Fritz Hamburg | Head coach | 18 | Ithaca College (1988) |
| Lee Saverio | Assistant coach | 5 | Bloomsburg University (1976) |
| Doc Neiman | Hitting coach | 3 | DeSales University (2011) |
| Scott Boches | Pitching coach | 1 | Marist University (2017) |

== Game log ==
2026 Saint Joseph's Hawks baseball game log (35–18)
Regular season (35–18)

February (2–7)
| Date | Opponent | Rank | Site/stadium | Score | Win | Loss | Save | TV | Attendance | Overall record | A10 record |
|---|---|---|---|---|---|---|---|---|---|---|---|
| February 13 | at High Point* | | George Erath Field; High Point, NC | **L** 7–15 | Shafer (1–0) | **Coppola** (0–1) | None | ESPN+ | 328 | 0–1 | — |
| February 14 | at High Point* | | George Erath Field | **L** 0–3 | Brachbill (1–0) | **Greer** (0–1) | Story (1) | ESPN+ | 289 | 0–2 | — |
| February 15 | at High Point* | | George Erath Field | **W** 6–1 | **Fitzgibbon** (1–0) | Paul (0–1) | None | ESPN+ | 275 | 1–2 | — |
| February 19 | at Sacramento State* | | John Smith Field; Sacramento, CA | **L** 1–4 | Winterhalder (1–0) | **McCarron** (0–1) | Wilson (1) | WACI | 103 | 1–3 | — |
| February 20 | at Sacramento State* | | John Smith Field | **W** 5–4^{12} | **Speicher** (1–0) | James (0–1) | None | ESPN+ | 343 | 2–3 | — |
| February 21 | at Sacramento State* | | John Smith Field | **L** 2–4 | Marton (1–0) | **Fehrman** (0–1) | Monson (1) | WACI | 317 | 2–4 | — |
| February 22 | at Sacramento State* | | John Smith Field | **L** 2–21 | Halverson (1–0) | **Parise** (0–1) | None | ESPN+ | 357 | 2–5 | — |
| February 24 | Rutgers* | | Smithson Field; Merion, PA | **Postponed to April 15** | | | | | | | |
| February 27 | at Wofford* | | Russell C. King Field; Spartanburg, SC | **L** 2–12^{8} | Michaels (3–0) | **McCarron** (0–2) | None | ESPN+ | 128 | 2–6 | — |
| February 28 | at Wofford* | | Russell C. King Field | **L** 6–10 | Bouchard (2–0) | **Fehrman** (0–2) | None | ESPN+ | 120 | 2–7 | — |

March (14–4)
| Date | Opponent | Rank | Site/stadium | Score | Win | Loss | Save | TV | Attendance | Overall record | A10 record |
|---|---|---|---|---|---|---|---|---|---|---|---|
| March 1 | at Wofford* | | Russell C. King Field | **W** 10–6 | **Gaines** (1–0) | Lewis (0–1) | None | ESPN+ | 228 | 3–7 | — |
| March 4 | Rider* | | Smithson Field | **Postponed to March 25** | | | | | | | |
| March 6 | at Bucknell* | | Eugene B. Depew Field; Lewisburg, PA | **W** 2–0 | **McCarron** (1–2) | Adelmann (0–3) | **Gaines** (1) | | 402 | 4–7 | — |
| March 7 | at Bucknell* | | Eugene B. Depew Field | **L** 13–15 | Garber (2–1) | **Fehrman** (0–3) | Maxwell (3) | | 356 | 4–8 | — |
| March 8 | Bucknell* | | Smithson Field | **W** 13–3 | **Parise** (1–1) | Hoar (1–2) | None | | 330 | 5–8 | — |
| March 11 | West Chester* | | Smithson Field | **L** 10–14 | Jones (1–0) | **Sweeney** (0–1) | None | | 302 | 5–9 | — |
| March 13 | at Richmond | | Malcolm U. Pitt Field; Tuckahoe, VA | **W** 11–9 | **Speicher** (2–0) | Topolski (0–1) | **Gaines** (2) | ESPN+ | 189 | 6–9 | 1–0 |
| March 14 | at Richmond | | Malcolm U. Pitt Field | **W** 4–3 | **Gaines** (2–0) | Gay (0–2) | None | ESPN+ | 248 | 7–9 | 2–0 |
| March 15 | at Richmond | | Malcolm U. Pitt Field | **W** 5–1 | **Parise** (2–1) | Santiago-Cruz (1–1) | None | ESPN+ | 214 | 8–9 | 3–0 |
| March 18 | at Delaware* | | Bob Hannah Stadium; Newark, DE | **L** 0–18^{7} | Deibler (2–1) | **Sweeney** (0–2) | None | ESPN+ | 188 | 8–10 | — |
| March 20 | George Washington | | Smithson Field | **W** 7–4 | **McCarron** (2–2) | Haug (1–3) | None | ESPN+ | 147 | 9–10 | 4–0 |
| March 21 | George Washington | | Smithson Field | **W** 6–5 | **Gaines** (3–0) | Lebel (0–1) | None | ESPN+ | 213 | 10–10 | 5–0 |
| March 22 | George Washington | | Smithson Field | **W** 7–5 | **Parise** (3–1) | Thyen (0–1) | **Speicher** (1) | ESPN+ | 359 | 11–10 | 6–0 |
| March 24 | at Navy* | | Terwilliger Field; Annapolis, MD | **W** 3–2^{10} | **Greer** (1–1) | Grenn (1–1) | None | | 547 | 12–10 | — |
| March 25 | Rider* | | Smithson Field | **W** 11–10 | **Bashore** (1–0) | D'Ambrosio (0–1) | **Gaines** (3) | ESPN+ | 202 | 13–10 | — |
| March 27 | at Fordham | | Houlihan Park; Bronx, NY | **W** 20–0 | **Speicher** (3–0) | Elson (3–2) | None | ESPN+ | 125 | 14–10 | 7–0 |
| March 28 | at Fordham | | Houlihan Park | **W** 3–0 | **Fehrman** (1–3) | Hanawalt (1–4) | **Gaines** (4) | ESPN+ | 192 | 15–10 | 8–0 |
| March 29 | at Fordham | | Houlihan Park | **L** 6–7 | Berg (1–0) | **Fitzgibbon** (1–1) | None | ESPN+ | 203 | 15–11 | 8–1 |
Liberty Bell Classic quarterfinal
| March 31 | Lehigh* | | Smithson Field | **W** 16–10^{8} | **Sweeney** (1–1) | Holman (1–3) | None | | 201 | 16–11 | — |

April (13–4)
| Date | Opponent | Rank | Site/stadium | Score | Win | Loss | Save | TV | Attendance | Overall record | A10 record |
|---|---|---|---|---|---|---|---|---|---|---|---|
| April 2 | Saint Louis | | Smithson Field | **W** 18–4 | **Speicher** (4–0) | Cherico (2–3) | **Greer** (1) | ESPN+ | 225 | 17–11 | 9–1 |
| April 3 | Saint Louis | | Smithson Field | **W** 5–4 | **Coppola** (1–1) | Welk (1–5) | **Gaines** (5) | ESPN+ | 333 | 18–11 | 10–1 |
| April 4 | Saint Louis | | Smithson Field | **W** 7–3 | **Fehrman** (2–3) | Andrunas (2–4) | **Parise** (1) | ESPN+ | 400 | 19–11 | 11–1 |
Liberty Bell Classic semifinal
| April 8 | Rider* | | Smithson Field | **W** 11–10 | **Speicher** (5–0) | Dorety (0–1) | **Gaines** (6) | ESPN+ | 216 | 20–11 | — |
| April 10 | at Dayton | | Woerner Field; Dayton, OH | **W** 5–3^{10} | **Campbell** (1–0) | McNabb (2–2) | **Speicher** (2) | ESPN+ | 201 | 21–11 | 12–1 |
| April 11 | at Dayton | | Woerner Field | **W** 5–4 | **Fehrman** (3–3) | Whiteside (1–4) | **Gaines** (7) | ESPN+ | 202 | 22–11 | 13–1 |
| April 12 | at Dayton | | Woerner Field | **W** 18–5 | **Parise** (4–1) | Delgado (1–3) | None | ESPN+ | 257 | 23–11 | 14–1 |
| April 15 | Rutgers* | | Smithson Field | **L** 1–11^{7} | Masick (1–0) | **Bashore** (1–1) | None | | 228 | 23–12 | — |
| April 17 | George Mason | | Smithson Field | **L** 6–9^{10} | Stewart (3–3) | **Gaines** (3–1) | None | | 350 | 23–13 | 14–2 |
| April 18 | George Mason | | Smithson Field | **W** 17–9 | **Greer** (2–1) | Cardenas (3–5) | None | ESPN+ | 400 | 24–13 | 15–2 |
| April 19 | George Mason | | Smithson Field | **W** 15–6 | **Parise** (5–1) | Drumm (3–1) | None | ESPN+ | 400 | 25–13 | 16–2 |
Liberty Bell Classic championship game
| April 21 | vs. Penn* | | Citizens Bank Park; Philadelphia, PA | **W** 8–2 | **Sweeney** (2–1) | Pokrovsky (0–1) | None | | 532 | 26–13 | — |
| April 22 | Delaware* | | Smithson Field | **L** 6–15 | Reyes (2–1) | **Wells** (0–1) | Hulcher (1) | ESPN+ | 135 | 26–14 | — |
| April 24 | at La Salle | | Hank DeVincent Field; Philadelphia, PA | **W** 6–5 | **McCarron** (3–2) | MacDonnell (2–4) | **Gaines** (8) | ESPN+ | 150 | 27–14 | 17–2 |
| April 25 | at La Salle | | Hank DeVincent Field | **W** 15–6 | **Greer** (3–1) | Terry (1–4) | None | ESPN+ | 150 | 28–14 | 18–2 |
| April 26 | at La Salle | | Hank DeVincent Field | **W** 12–2^{7} | **Parise** (6–1) | Howarth (1–3) | None | ESPN+ | 160 | 29–14 | 19–2 |
| April 28 | at Villanova* | | Villanova Ballpark; Plymouth Meeting, PA | **L** 7–8 | McKenzie (2–0) | **Gaines** (3–2) | None | BEDN | 81 | 29–15 | — |

May (6–3)
| Date | Opponent | Rank | Site/stadium | Score | Win | Loss | Save | TV | Attendance | Overall record | A10 record |
|---|---|---|---|---|---|---|---|---|---|---|---|
| May 1 | St. Bonaventure | | Smithson Field | **W** 11–10 | **McCarron** (4–2) | James (2–6) | **Gaines** (9) | | 251 | 30–15 | 20–2 |
| May 2 | St. Bonaventure | | Smithson Field | **W** 3–0 | **Fehrman** (4–3) | Ciampa (3–2) | **Greer** (2) | | 363 | 31–15 | 21–2 |
| May 3 | St. Bonaventure | | Smithson Field | **W** 14–9 | **Sweeney** (3–1) | Capellupo (1–4) | None | ESPN+ | 323 | 32–15 | 22–2 |
| May 8 | VCU | | Smithson Field | **L** 6–9 | Campbell (3–1) | Greer (3–2) | Peters (6) | ESPN+ | 185 | 32–16 | 22–3 |
| May 9 | VCU | | Smithson Field | **W** 6–4 | **Speicher** (6–0) | Frers (1–3) | **Gaines** (10) | ESPN+ | 185 | 33–16 | 23–3 |
| May 10 | VCU | | Smithson Field | **L** 5–19^{7} | Clover (2–3) | **Parise** (6–2) | None | ESPN+ | 301 | 33–17 | 23–4 |
| May 14 | at Rhode Island | | Bill Beck Field; Kingston, RI | **W** 10–9^{11} | **Wells** (1–2) | Sabbath (2–5) | None | ESPN+ | 337 | 34–17 | 24–4 |
| May 15 | at Rhode Island | | Bill Beck Field | **L** 3–4^{10} | Sabbath (3–5) | **Greer** (3–3) | None | ESPN+ | 124 | 34–18 | 24–5 |
| May 16 | at Rhode Island | | Bill Beck Field | **W** 14–12 | **Veintimilla** (1–0) | Grotyohann (2–1) | **Wells** (1) | ESPN+ | 150 | 35–18 | 25–5 |

Postseason (1–2)

Atlantic 10 tournament (1–2)
| Date | Opponent | Rank | Site/stadium | Score | Win | Loss | Save | TV | Attendance | Overall record | A10T record |
|---|---|---|---|---|---|---|---|---|---|---|---|
| May 21 | vs. (5) Rhode Island | (1) | Capital One Park; Tysons, VA | **L** 9–17 | Cullen (3–4) | **McCarron** (4–3) | Turner (2) | ESPN+ | 602 | 35–19 | 0–1 |
| May 22 | vs. (4) George Mason | (1) | Capital One Park | **W** 14–4 | **Fehrman** (5–3) | Parker (3–1) | None | ESPN+ | 650 | 36–19 | 1–1 |
| May 23 | vs. (3) VCU | (1) | Capital One Park | **L** 3–13 | Peters (8–1) | **Gaines** (3–3) | None | ESPN+ | 816 | 36–20 | 1–2 |

*Denotes non–conference game • Schedule source • Rankings based on the teams' current ranking in the D1Baseball poll
**W** Saint Joseph's win • **L** Saint Joseph's loss • **T** Saint Joseph's tie • Postponement or cancellation • **Bold** denotes Saint Joseph's player

== Tournaments ==
=== Liberty Bell Classic ===
Liberty Bell Classic
| Delaware Fightin' Blue Hens | Delaware State Hornets | Lafayette Leopards | Lehigh Mountain Hawks | Penn Quakers | Rider Broncs | Saint Joseph's Hawks | Villanova Wildcats |

Quarterfinals; March 31–April 1
Delaware | 5
Rider | 10
Saint Joseph's | 16^{8}
Lehigh | 10
Lafayette | 11
Villanova | 1
Penn | 10
Delaware State | 5

Semifinals
Rider | 10
Saint Joseph's | 11
Lafayette | 3
Penn | 13^{7}

Finals
Saint Joseph's | 8
Penn | 2

=== Atlantic 10 tournament ===
Atlantic 10 baseball tournament
| (1) Saint Joseph's Hawks | (2) Richmond Spiders | (3) VCU Rams | (4) George Mason Patriots | (5) Rhode Island Rams | (6) Davidson Wildcats |

Upper round 1 | Upper round 2 | Upper final | Final
1 | Saint Joseph's | 9
4 | George Mason | 8 | 5 | Rhode Island | 17
5 | Rhode Island | 19 | 5 | Rhode Island | 5
3 | VCU | 4
2 | Richmond | 4
3 | VCU | 7 | 3 | VCU | 7
6 | Davidson | 4
5 | Rhode Island | 16
3 | VCU | 18 | 9
Lower round 1 | Lower round 2 | Lower round 3 | Lower final
. | 1 | Saint Joseph's | 3
1 | Saint Joseph's | 14 | 3 | VCU | 13
4 | George Mason | 11 | 4 | George Mason | 4
4 | George Mason | 9 | 2 | Richmond | 6
6 | Davidson | 1

== Rankings ==
Ranking movements Legend: ██ Increase in ranking ██ Decrease in ranking — = Not ranked RV = Received votes
| | Week | | | | | | | | | | | | | | | | | |
| Poll | Pre | 1 | 2 | 3 | 4 | 5 | 6 | 7 | 8 | 9 | 10 | 11 | 12 | 13 | 14 | 15 | 16 | Final |
|---|---|---|---|---|---|---|---|---|---|---|---|---|---|---|---|---|---|---|
| Coaches' | — | —* | — | — | — | — | — | — | — | — | — | — | — | — | — | — | —* | |
| Baseball America | — | — | — | — | — | — | — | — | — | — | — | — | — | — | — | —* | —* | |
| NCBWA† | — | — | — | — | — | — | — | — | — | — | RV | RV | RV | RV | RV | RV* | RV | |
| D1Baseball | — | — | — | — | — | — | — | — | — | — | — | — | — | — | — | — | —* | |
| Perfect Game | — | — | — | — | — | — | — | — | — | — | — | — | — | — | — | —* | —* | |

† NCBWA ranks 30 teams in their preseason poll, but only ranks 25 teams weekly during the season.
* A new poll was not released for this week, so for comparison purposes, the previous week's ranking is inserted in this week's slot.
