= 2026 George Mason Patriots baseball team =

Season of George Mason Patriots baseball team

2026 George Mason Patriots baseball
- Conference: Atlantic 10 Conference
- Record: 30–26 (18–12 A-10)
- Head coach: Shawn Camp (4th season)
- Assistant coaches: Evan Duhon (3rd season); Kyle Darmstead (3rd season)
- Hitting coach: Tyler Nelin (3rd season)
- Pitching coach: Tommy Winterstein (2nd season)
- Home stadium: Spuhler Field

2026 Atlantic 10 Conference baseball standings
	Conf.						Overall
Team	W		L		T	PCT	W		L		T	PCT
Saint Joseph's ‍†‍‍	25	–	5	–	0	.833	35	–	18	–	0	.660
Richmond ‍‍‍	20	–	10	–	0	.667	33	–	22	–	0	.600
VCU ‍‍‡‍^{y}	20	–	10	–	0	.667	37	–	23	–	0	.617
George Mason ‍‍‍	18	–	12	–	0	.600	28	–	24	–	0	.538
Davidson ‍‍‍	16	–	14	–	0	.533	25	–	26	–	0	.490
Rhode Island ‍‍‍	16	–	14	–	0	.533	23	–	29	–	0	.442
Dayton ‍‍‍	15	–	15	–	0	.500	31	–	23	–	0	.574
Fordham ‍‍‍	15	–	15	–	0	.500	25	–	30	–	0	.455
Saint Louis ‍‍‍	11	–	19	–	0	.367	20	–	34	–	0	.370
George Washington ‍‍‍	9	–	21	–	0	.300	18	–	35	–	0	.340
La Salle ‍‍‍	8	–	22	–	0	.267	24	–	31	–	0	.436
St. Bonaventure ‍‍‍	7	–	23	–	0	.233	13	–	36	–	1	.270
† – Conference champion ‡ – Tournament champion y – Invited to the NCAA tournament As of May 17, 2026; Rankings from D1Baseball

The 2026 George Mason Patriots baseball team represents George Mason University in the sport of college baseball for the 2026 season. The Patriots compete in the Atlantic 10 Conference (A-10) and play their home games at Spuhler Field in Fairfax, Virginia. The team is led by head coach Shawn Camp in his fourth season.

== Previous season ==
The Patriots are coming off a 40–21 (20–10) season, where they qualified as the second-overall seed for the 2025 Atlantic 10 Conference baseball tournament. There, the Patriots went 4–2, losing in the final to Rhode Island. George Mason did not receive an at-large berth into the 2025 NCAA Division I baseball tournament. Outfielder, James Quinn-Irons, was named the Atlantic 10 Conference Player of the Year, and for the first time George Mason history, was named a Golden Spikes Award semifinalist. Quinn-Irons was drafted in the fifth round of the 2025 MLB draft by the Tampa Bay Rays and assigned to their single-A affiliate, Charleston RiverDogs. Additionally, Quinn-Irons was named to the 2025 College Baseball All-America Team.

In addition to Quinn-Irons, shortstop Owen Clyne and starting pitchers, Brandon Cassedy and Connor O'Hara were named to the all-Atlantic 10 first team. Designated hitter, Owen Hull, was named to the All-Atlantic 10 second team. Lucas Alberti and Andrew Raymond were named to the All-Rookie team while Gardner Meeks, and O'Hara were named to the All-Academic team.

== Preseason ==
=== Preseason Atlantic 10 awards and honors ===
Preseason awards will be announced in February 2026.

Preseason All-Atlantic 10 Team
Player	No.	Pos.	Team	Class	Selector
Owen Clyne	11	SS	First	Senior	Perfect Game
Lucas Alberti	16	OF	First	Sophomore	Perfect Game
Carter Kelsey	45	RP	First	Graduate	Perfect Game

=== Coaches poll ===
The coaches poll was released on February 13, 2026. George Mason was selected to finish second.

Coaches' Poll
Predicted finish	Team	Points
1	Rhode Island	136 (5)
2	George Mason	122 (4)
T−3	Saint Joseph's	98 (1)
T−3	Saint Louis	98
T−5	Dayton	83 (1)
T−5	Richmond	83
7	Davidson	77
8	VCU	71 (1)
9	George Washington	68
10	Fordham	56
11	St. Bonaventure	24
12	La Salle	20

== Personnel ==
=== Starters ===
Lineup
Pos.	No.	Player.	Year
C	12	Logan Vaughan	
1B	13	Matthew Westley	Junior
2B	3	Jake Bagnerise	Freshman
3B	2	Jake Butler	Junior
SS	11	Owen Clyne	Senior
LF	16	Lucas Alberti	Sophomore
CF	9	Luciano Terilli	Graduate
RF	8	Drew Canody	Senior
DH	5	Jackson Morse	Freshman

Weekend pitching rotation
Day	No.	Player.	Year
Friday	43	Diego Cardenas	Graduate
Saturday	31	Logan Rumberg	Senior
Sunday	38	Jake Drumm	Sophomore

=== Roster ===
2026 George Mason Patriots baseball team
Players
Coaches

#	Pos.	Name	B/T	Height	Weight	Year	Home town
1	INF	Evan Blanchard	R/R	5 ft 10 in (1.78 m)	180 lb (82 kg)	Sr	Manassas, VA
2	INF	Jake Butler	R/R	5 ft 11 in (1.8 m)	205 lb (93 kg)	Jr	Baltimore, MD
3	INF	Julius Bagnerise	R/R	5 ft 9 in (1.75 m)	170 lb (77 kg)	Fr	Woodbridge, VA
5	INF	Jackson Morse	R/R	5 ft 9 in (1.75 m)	180 lb (82 kg)	Fr	Raynham, MA
7	OF	Vincent Cowdrey	S/R	5 ft 11 in (1.8 m)	195 lb (88 kg)	Jr	White Lake, MI
8	UTL	Drew Canody	S/R	6 ft 1 in (1.85 m)	210 lb (95 kg)	Sr	Tampa, FL
9	OF	Luciano Terilli	S/R	5 ft 11 in (1.8 m)	180 lb (82 kg)	Gr	Dallas, TX
11	INF	Owen Clyne	L/L	6 ft 2 in (1.88 m)	185 lb (84 kg)	Sr	Wichita, KS
12	C	Logan Vaughan	R/R	6 ft 1 in (1.85 m)	210 lb (95 kg)	Gr	Coweta, OK
13	INF	Matthew Westley	L/R	6 ft 0 in (1.83 m)	200 lb (91 kg)	Jr	Manassas, VA
15	UTL	Cooper Smith	R/R	5 ft 11 in (1.8 m)	190 lb (86 kg)	Gr	Eden Prairie, MN
16	OF	Lucas Alberti	R/R	5 ft 10 in (1.78 m)	185 lb (84 kg)	So	Toronto, ON
17	C	Jack McCarthy	R/R	6 ft 2 in (1.88 m)	215 lb (98 kg)	RS So	Burke, VA
18	RHP	Brandon Hsu	R/R	5 ft 10 in (1.78 m)	185 lb (84 kg)	Gr	Brookline, NH
19	RHP	Owen Stewart	S/R	6 ft 3 in (1.91 m)	180 lb (82 kg)	Sr	Elmira, NY
20	RHP	Brant Ertel	R/R	6 ft 1 in (1.85 m)	185 lb (84 kg)	Jr	Cedar Grove, IN
23	OF	Laken Tignor	R/R	5 ft 10 in (1.78 m)	195 lb (88 kg)	Sr	Tappahannock, VA
25	RHP	Tyson Willis	R/R	6 ft 4 in (1.93 m)	220 lb (100 kg)	Gr	Snohomish, WA
26	RHP	Toby Hueber	R/R	5 ft 9 in (1.75 m)	175 lb (79 kg)	Jr	Cincinnati, OH
30	RHP	Jackson Peters	R/R	6 ft 5 in (1.96 m)	230 lb (104 kg)	Gr	Planto, TX
31	RHP	Logan Rumberg	R/R	5 ft 11 in (1.8 m)	185 lb (84 kg)	Sr	Okotoks, AB
32	RHP	Thomas Wrehe	R/R	6 ft 1 in (1.85 m)	210 lb (95 kg)	Gr	Fort Worth, TX
33	LHP	Tanner Kaler	L/L	6 ft 0 in (1.83 m)	190 lb (86 kg)	Jr	Concord, NC
35	RHP	Aiden Parker	R/R	6 ft 7 in (2.01 m)	210 lb (95 kg)	Fr	Virginia Beach, VA
36	RHP	Parker Thomas	S/R	6 ft 3 in (1.91 m)	215 lb (98 kg)	Jr	Bowie, MD
37	RHP	Sam DiLella	R/R	6 ft 2 in (1.88 m)	205 lb (93 kg)	Gr	Wayne, PA
38	RHP	Jake Drumm	R/R	6 ft 2 in (1.88 m)	185 lb (84 kg)	So	Burke, VA
40	C	Austin O'Hara	R/R	5 ft 10 in (1.78 m)	185 lb (84 kg)	Fr	Ponte Vedra Beach, FL
43	RHP	Diego Cardenas	R/R	5 ft 11 in (1.8 m)	190 lb (86 kg)	Gr	South Bend, IN
45	RHP	Carter Kelsey	R/R	6 ft 5 in (1.96 m)	235 lb (107 kg)	Gr	Westport, CT
46	LHP	Shaun O'Keeffe	L/L	6 ft 1 in (1.85 m)	195 lb (88 kg)	Jr	Toms River, NJ
55	LHP	Michael Madigan	L/L	6 ft 0 in (1.83 m)	205 lb (93 kg)	So	Syracuse, NY

Head coach

Shawn Camp

Assistant coach(es)

Tyler Nelin
Tommy Winterstein
Evan Duhon

Legend

- (C) Team captain
- (S) Suspended
- (I) Ineligible
- Injured
- Current redshirt

Roster
Last update: April 13, 2026

=== Coaching staff ===
2026 George Mason Patriots baseball coaching staff
Name	Position	Seasons at GMU	Alma mater
Shawn Camp	Head coach	4	George Mason University (1996)
Evan Duhon	Assistant coach	2	Queens University of Charlotte (2019)
Tyler Nelin	Hitting coach	3	George Mason University (2017)
Tommy Winterstein	Pitching coach	2	Charleston Southern University (2016)
Kyle Darmstead	Director of Operations	3	Christopher Newport University (2020)
Hannah Stapleford	Athletic Trainer	6	Longwood University (2017)
Brandon Golden	Director of Player Performance	1	East Carolina University (2012)
Danile Ostberg	Strength & Conditioning Coach	3	Rutgers University–New Brunswick (2016)

== Offseason ==
=== Departures ===
Offseason departures
Name	No.	Pos.	Height	Weight	Year	Hometown	Notes
Brandon Cassedy	3	RHP	5 ft 11 in (1.80 m)	230 pounds (100 kg)	Junioer	Manassas, VA	Did not return
Sam Lavin	13	C	6 ft 1 in (1.85 m)	195 pounds (88 kg)	Graduate	Algonquin, IL	Graduated
Connor O'Hara	14	RHP	6 ft 3 in (1.91 m)	210 pounds (95 kg)	Graduate	Davie, FL	Graduated
Jonny Wall	15	INF	6 ft 0 in (1.83 m)	200 pounds (91 kg)	Graduate	Virginia Beach, VA	Graduated
Nick Barenz	17	C	6 ft 2 in (1.88 m)	215 pounds (98 kg)	Graduate	Potomac Falls, VA	Graduated
Daniel Elliott	21	RHP	6 ft 0 in (1.83 m)	190 pounds (86 kg)	Graduate	Fulton, MD	Graduated
Ryan Edmonds	22	RHP	6 ft 2 in (1.88 m)	220 pounds (100 kg)	Sophomore	Severn, MD	Did not return
Ryan Ament	35	LHP	6 ft 5 in (1.96 m)	230 pounds (100 kg)	Graduate	Parlin, NJ	Graduated
Britt Yount	37	RHP	6 ft 2 in (1.88 m)	210 pounds (95 kg)	Senior	Stafford, VA	Graduated
Gardner Meeks	45	RHP	5 ft 10 in (1.78 m)	180 pounds (82 kg)	Graduate	Virginia Beach, VA	Graduated

==== Outgoing transfers ====
Outgoing transfers
Name	Number	Pos.	Height	Weight	Hometown	Year	New school	Source
Tripp Capers	5	OF	5 ft 11 in (1.80 m)	185 pounds (84 kg)	Blue Bell, PA	Freshman	Jefferson	
Owen Hull	6	INF	6 ft 4 in (1.93 m)	215 pounds (98 kg)	Alexandria, VA	Sophomore	North Carolina	
Garrett Pancione	7	C	6 ft 1 in (1.85 m)	205 pounds (93 kg)	Warrenton, VA	Junior	Ferrum	
Andrew Raymond	9	C	6 ft 1 in (1.85 m)	195 pounds (88 kg)	Middletown, MD	Freshman	Mississippi State	
Ty Uchman	12	LHP	6 ft 2 in (1.88 m)	195 pounds (88 kg)	Viera, FL	Sophomore	Grand Valley State	
Ty Tomlinson	18	INF	6 ft 2 in (1.88 m)	195 pounds (88 kg)	Portage, MI	Freshman	Western Michigan	
Louden Hilliard	25	RHP	5 ft 11 in (1.80 m)	180 pounds (82 kg)	Milford, OH	Freshman	Morehead State	
Dylan McCarthy	28	RHP	6 ft 1 in (1.85 m)	210 pounds (95 kg)	Chester, VT	Sophomore	Stonehill	
Cole Egan	32	LHP	6 ft 2 in (1.88 m)	185 pounds (84 kg)	Pittsburgh, PA	Sophomore	Eastern Michigan	
Michael Bilo	33	RHP	6 ft 4 in (1.93 m)	215 pounds (98 kg)	Mason, OH	Freshman	Wright State	
Jake Stanley	34	C	5 ft 10 in (1.78 m)	195 pounds (88 kg)	Wake Forest, NC	Freshman	Brunswick	

==== 2025 MLB draft ====
2025 MLB draft selections
Round	Pick	Overall pick	Player	Position	MLB team
5	11	147	James Quinn-Irons	OF	Tampa Bay Rays
18	16	541	Connor Knox	P	Chicago Cubs

=== Acquisitions ===
==== Incoming transfers ====
Incoming transfers
Name	No.	Pos.	Height	Weight	Hometown	Year	Previous school
Vincent Cowdrey	7	C/OF	5 ft 11 in (1.80 m)	195 pounds (88 kg)	White Lake, MI	Junior	Macomb
Matthew Westley	13	INF	6 ft 0 in (1.83 m)	200 pounds (91 kg)	Manassas, VA	Junior	Virginia Tech
Jack McCarthy	17	C	6 ft 2 in (1.88 m)	215 pounds (98 kg)	Burke, VA	RS Sophomore	Marymount
Tanner Kaler	33	LHP	6 ft 0 in (1.83 m)	190 pounds (86 kg)	Concord, NC	Junior	Charlotte
Parker Thomas	36	RHP	6 ft 3 in (1.91 m)	215 pounds (98 kg)	Bowie, MD	Junior	Wright State

==== Incoming recruits ====
2025 GMU Recruits
Name	Number	B/T	Pos.	Height	Weight	Hometown	High School
Julius Bagnerise	3	R/R	INF	5 ft 9 in (1.75 m)	170 pounds (77 kg)	Woodbridge, VA	Colgan
Jackson Morse	5	R/R	INF	5 ft 9 in (1.75 m)	180 pounds (82 kg)	Raynham, MA	Xaverian Brothers
Aiden Parker	35	R/R	RHP	6 ft 7 in (2.01 m)	210 pounds (95 kg)	Virginia Beach, VA	First Colonial
Austin O'Hara	40	R/R	C	5 ft 10 in (1.78 m)	185 pounds (84 kg)	Ponte Vedra Beach, FL	Jacksonville Episcopal

== Game log ==
2026 George Mason Patriots baseball game log (30–26)
Regular season (28–24)

February (3–5)
Date	Time (ET)	TV	Opponent	Rank	Stadium	Score	Win	Loss	Save	Attendance	Overall	A10	Sources
February 13	6:05 p.m.	B1G+	at No. 23 Oregon*		PK Park; Eugene, OR	**L** 2–6	Sanford (1–0)	**Stewart** (0–1)	None	2,241	0–1	—	Report
February 14	2:05 p.m.	B1G+	at No. 23 Oregon*		PK Park	**L** 5–14	Clarke (1–0)	**Cardenas** (0–1)	None	1,917	0–2	—	Report
February 14	6:30 p.m.	B1G+	at No. 23 Oregon*		PK Park	**L** 4–14	Scolari (1–0)	**Rumberg** (0–1)	None	1,917	0–3	—	Report
February 15	3:05 p.m.	B1G+	at No. 23 Oregon*		PK Park	**L** 1–11	Featherson (1–0)	**Wrehe** (0–1)	None	2,067	0–4	—	Report
Swig & Swine Classic
February 20	2:00 p.m.	ESPN+	vs. Seton Hall*		Shipyard Park; Charleston, SC	**L** 6–8	Benzinger (1–0)	**Hsu** (0–1)	Higgins (2)	324	0–5	—	Report
February 21	11:00 a.m.	ESPN+	vs. Ball State*		Shipyard Park	**W** 6–1	**Rumberg** (1–1)	Garza (1–1)	**Kelsey** (1)	307	1–5	—	Report
February 22	11:00 a.m.	ESPN+	vs. Seton Hall*		Shipyard Park	**W** 11–4	**Cardenas** (1–1)	Reich (1–1)	None	324	2–5	—	Report
February 24	11:00 a.m.	ESPN+	William & Mary*		Spuhler Field; Fairfax, VA	**Canceled (inclement weather)**							
February 27	7:00 p.m.	ESPN+	vs. Lehigh*		Capital One Park; Tysons, VA	**W** 7–4	**Stewart** (1–1)	Fairhurst (1–1)	**Kelsey** (2)	191	3–5	—	Report
February 28	2:00 p.m.	ESPN+	vs. Lehigh*		Spuhler Field; Fairfax, VA	**Canceled (inclement weather)**							

March (11–7)
Date	Time (ET)	TV	Opponent	Rank	Stadium	Score	Win	Loss	Save	Attendance	Overall	A10	Sources
March 1	4:30 p.m.	ESPN+	vs. Lehigh*		Capital One Park	**W** 3–0	**Rumberg** (1–1)	Leaman (0–2)	**Ertel** (2)	236	4–5	—	Report
March 3	2:30 p.m.	ESPN+	at James Madison*		Eagle Field at Veterans Memorial Park; Harrisonburg, VA	**W** 11–2	**Cardenas** (2–1)	Polley (0–2)	**Drumm** (1)	62	5–5	—	Report
March 4	2:00 p.m.	FloSports	at Towson*		John B. Schuerholz Park; Towson, MD	**Canceled (inclement weather)**							
March 6	2:00 p.m.	ESPN+	Georgetown*		Spuhler Field	**L** 5–6	Leckszas (3–1)	**Stewart** (1–2)	Jackman (3)	75	5–6	—	Report
March 7	3:00 p.m.	ESPN+	at Georgetown*		Capital One Park	**W** 12–7	**Ertel** (1–0)	Lee (0–1)	None	317	6–6	—	Report
March 8	1:00 p.m.	ESPN+	Georgetown*		Spuhler Field	**L** 4–5	Seid (4–0)	**Cardenas** (2–2)	Jackman (4)	232	6–7	—	Report
March 10	4:00 p.m.	ESPN+	at Longwood*		Bolding Stadium; Farmville, VA	**L** 1–11^{8}	Bunch (2–0)	**O'Keeffe** (0–1)	None	158	6–8	—	Report
March 13	2:00 p.m.	ESPN+	St. Bonaventure		Spuhler Field	**W** 4–3	**Rumberg** (2–1)	James (3–1)	**Stewart** (1)	51	7–8	1–0	Report
March 14	1:00 p.m.	ESPN+	St. Bonaventure		Spuhler Field	**W** 15–11	**Willis** (1–0)	Capellupo (0–1)	**Kelsey** (3)	105	8–8	2–0	Report
March 15	12:00 p.m.	ESPN+	St. Bonaventure		Spuhler Field	**W** 3–0	**Drumm** (1–0)	Paulino (1–4)	**Stewart** (2)	78	9–8	3–0	Report
March 18	3:00 p.m.	ESPN+	Mount St. Mary's*		Spuhler Field	**L** 8–9	McCrary (3–1)	**Willis** (0–1)	Manarchuck (4)	52	9–9	—	Report
March 20	3:00 p.m.	ESPN+	at Rhode Island		Bill Beck Field; Kingston, RI	**L** 5–10	Sabbath (1–3)	**Ertel** (1–1)	Houchens (1)	108	9–10	3–1	Report
March 21	1:00 p.m.	ESPN+	at Rhode Island		Bill Beck Field	**W** 3–1	**Cardenas** (3–2)	Johnston (1–3)	**Hsu** (1)	189	10–10	4–1	Report
March 22	12:00 p.m.	ESPN+	at Rhode Island		Bill Beck Field	**L** 9–10	Lavigueur (1–0)	**Kelsey** (0–1)	None	125	10–11	4–2	Report
March 24	3:00 p.m.	ESPN+	Longwood*		Spuhler Field	**W** 14–4^{7}	**Parker** (1–0)	Gray (0–1)	None	108	11–11	—	Report
March 27	7:00 p.m.	ESPN+	at Saint Louis		Billiken Sports Center; St. Louis, MO	**W** 5–3	**Rumberg** (4–1)	Cherico (2–2)	**Stewart** (3)	215	12–11	5–2	Report
March 28	3:00 p.m.	ESPN+	at Saint Louis		Billiken Sports Center	**W** 5–3	**Kelsey** (1–1)	Welk (1–4)	None	175	13–11	6–2	Report
March 29	1:00 p.m.	ESPN+	at Saint Louis		Billiken Sports Center	**W** 3–1	**Drumm** (2–0)	Andrunas (2–3)	**Stewart** (4)	185	14–11	7–2	Report
March 31	3:05 p.m.	ESPN+	USC Upstate*		Spuhler Field	**L** 10–14	Torres (2–2)	**Peters** (0–1)	None	78	14–12	—	Report

April (5–11)
Date	Time (ET)	TV	Opponent	Rank	Stadium	Score	Win	Loss	Save	Attendance	Overall	A10	Sources
April 3	2:00 p.m.	ESPN+	Davidson		Spuhler Field	**W** 3–2	**Stewart** (2–2)	Hoyt (1–2)	None	174	15–12	8–2	Report
April 4	11:00 a.m.	ESPN+	Davidson		Spuhler Field	**L** 0–4	Cavanaugh (2–2)	**Cardenas** (3–3)	None	105	15–13	8–3	Report
April 4	2:30 p.m.	ESPN+	Davidson		Spuhler Field	**L** 4–7	Taggart (1–0)	**Kelsey** (1–2)	Marenghi (1)	276	15–14	8–4	Report
April 8	3:00 p.m.	ESPN+	Towson*		Spuhler Field	**L** 4–5	Michel (1–0)	**Kaler** (0–1)	Whiteman (4)	98	15–15	—	Report
April 10	2:00 p.m.	ESPN+	Richmond		Spuhler Field	**L** 2–4	Topolski (3–2)	**Stewart** (2–3)	Ruggiero (3)	120	15–16	8–5	Report
April 11	1:00 p.m.	ESPN+	Richmond		Spuhler Field	**L** 3–11	Giordano (8–0)	**Cardenas** (3–4)	None	134	15–17	8–6	Report
April 12	12:00 p.m.	ESPN+	Richmond		Spuhler Field	**W** 7–5	**Drumm** (3–0)	Hinchliffe (3–4)	**Stewart** (5)	146	16–17	9–6	Report
April 15	6:00 p.m.		at Mount St. Mary's*		Straw Family Stadium; Emmitsburg, MD	**W** 13–3^{6}	**Hsu** (1–1)	Crowe (0–2)	None	100	17–17	—	Report
April 17	3:00 p.m.	ESPN+	at Saint Joseph's		John W. Smithson Field; Merion, PA	**W** 9–6^{10}	**Owen** (3–3)	Gaines (3–1)	None	350	18–17	10–6	Report
April 18	2:00 p.m.	ESPN+	at Saint Joseph's		John W. Smithson Field	**L** 9–17	Greer (2–1)	**Cardenas** (3–5)	None	400	18–18	10–7	Report
April 19	1:00 p.m.	ESPN+	at Saint Joseph's		John W. Smithson Field	**L** 6–15	Parise (5–1)	**Drumm** (3–1)	None	400	18–19	10–8	Report
April 21	3:00 p.m.	ESPN+	James Madison*		Spuhler Field	**W** 7–4	**Kahler** (1–1)	Pearne (0–1)	**Cardenas** (1)	213	19–19	—	Report
April 24	3:00 p.m.	ESPN+	at Fordham		Jim Houlihan Park; New York City, NY	**L** 4–11	Elson (5–4)	**Rumberg** (4–2)	None	167	19–20	10–9	Report
April 26	11:00 a.m.	ESPN+	at Fordham		Jim Houlihan Park	**L** 1–2^{7}	Hanawalt (3–5)	**Drumm** (3–2)	None	123	19–21	10–10	Report
April 26	2:30 p.m.	ESPN+	at Fordham		Jim Houlihan Park	**L** 4–5^{12}	Cawley (2–3)	**Stewart** (3–4)	None	123	19–22	10–11	Report
April 28	6:00 p.m.	ACCNX	at No. 23 Virginia*		Ted Davenport Field; Charlottesville, VA	**L** 1–5	Hartman (9–1)	**Kaler** (1–2)	Kapa (11)	3,288	19–23	—	Report

May (9–1)
Date	Time (ET)	TV	Opponent	Rank	Stadium	Score	Win	Loss	Save	Attendance	Overall	A10	Source
Revolutionary Rivalry
May 1	3:00 p.m.	ESPN+	George Washington		Spuhler Field	**W** 16–1	**Rumberg** (5–2)	Miller (3–2)	**Thomas** (1)	130	20–23	11–11	Report
May 2	2:00 p.m.	ESPN+	George Washington		Spuhler Field	**W** 8–5	**Stewart** (4–4)	Bruno (0–3)	None	165	21–23	12–11	Report
May 3	1:00 p.m.	ESPN+	George Washington		Spuhler Field	**W** 6–5	**Cardenas** (4–5)	Wywoda (2–4)	**Rumberg** (1)	223	22–23	13–11	Report
May 5	6:00 p.m.	FloSports	at William & Mary*		Plumeri Park; Williamsburg, VA	**W** 15–14	**Kelsey** (2–2)	Weight (4–2)	**Cardenas** (2)	337	23–23	—	Report
May 8	3:00 p.m.	ESPN+	at Dayton		Larry Woerner Field; Dayton, OH	**L** 6–11	Jensen (7–2)	**Rumberg** (5–3)	Samuels (3)	288	23–24	13–12	Report
May 9	1:00 p.m.	ESPN+	at Dayton		Larry Woerner Field	**W** 6–4^{10}	**Stewart** (5–4)	Bello (0–1)	None	333	24–24	14–12	Report
May 10	12:00 p.m.	ESPN+	at Dayton		Larry Woerner Field	**W** 9–5	**Parker** (2–0)	McNabb (4–3)	**Cardenas** (2)	222	25–24	15–12	Report
May 14	2:00 p.m.	ESPN+	La Salle		Spuhler Field	**W** 17–5	**Rumberg** (6–3)	Edwardi (2–1)	None	147	26–24	16–12	Report
May 15	1:00 p.m.	ESPN+	La Salle		Spuhler Field	**W** 10–4	**Drumm** (4–2)	Shay (2–3)	None	162	27–24	17–12	Report
May 16	12:00 p.m.	ESPN+	La Salle		Spuhler Field	**W** 8–7	**Paker** (3–0)	MacDonnell (3–5)	**Thomas** (2)	211	28–24	18–12	Report

Postseason (2–2)

Atlantic 10 tournament (2–2)
Date	Time (ET)	TV	Opponent	Rank	Stadium	Score	Win	Loss	Save	Attendance	Overall	A10T Record	Sources
May 20	11:00 a.m.	ESPN+	vs. (5) Rhode Island	(4)	Capital One Park	**L** 8–19	Aikens (2–1)	**Drumm** (4–3)	None	603	28–25	0–1	Report
May 21	9:00 a.m.	ESPN+	vs. (6) Davidson	(4)	Capital One Park	**W** 9–1	**Rumberg** (7–3)	Perkins (1–4)	None		29–25	1–1	Report
May 22	7:30 p.m.	ESPN+	vs. (2) Richmond	(4)	Capital One Park	**W** 11–6	**Cardenas** (5–5)	Hinchliffe (4–6)	None		30–25	2–1	Report
May 22	7:30 p.m.	ESPN+	vs. (1) Saint Joseph's	(4)	Capital One Park	**L** 4–14	Fehrman (5–3)	**Parker** (3–1)	None		30–26	2–2	Report

Legend: = Win = Loss = Canceled
Bold = George Mason team member
Rankings are based on the team's current ranking in the D1Baseball poll.

== Tournaments ==
=== Atlantic 10 tournament ===
Atlantic 10 baseball tournament
(1) Saint Joseph's Hawks	(2) Richmond Spiders	(3) VCU Rams	(4) George Mason Patriots	(5) Rhode Island Rams	(6) Davidson Wildcats

Upper round 1	Upper round 2	Upper final	Final
1	Saint Joseph's	9
4	George Mason	8	5	Rhode Island	17
5	Rhode Island	19	5	Rhode Island	5
3	VCU	4
2	Richmond	4
3	VCU	7	3	VCU	7
6	Davidson	4
5	Rhode Island	16
3	VCU	18	9
Lower round 1	Lower round 2	Lower round 3	Lower final
.	1	Saint Joseph's	3
1	Saint Joseph's	14	3	VCU	13
4	George Mason	11	4	George Mason	4
4	George Mason	9	2	Richmond	6
6	Davidson	1

== Rankings ==
Ranking movements Legend: — = Not ranked
	Week																
Poll	Pre	1	2	3	4	5	6	7	8	9	10	11	12	13	14	15	Final
Coaches'	—	—*	—	—	—	—	—	—	—	—	—	—					
Baseball America	—	—	—	—	—	—	—	—	—	—	—	—					
NCBWA†	—	—	—	—	—	—	—	—	—	—	—	—					
D1Baseball	—	—	—	—	—	—	—	—	—	—	—	—					
Perfect Game	—	—	—	—	—	—	—	—	—	—	—	—					

† NCBWA ranks 30 teams in their preseason poll, but only ranks 25 teams weekly during the season.
* A new poll was not released for this week, so for comparison purposes, the previous week's ranking is inserted in this week's slot.
