= Fritz Hamburg =

American college baseball coach

Current position
- Title: Head coach
- Team: Saint Joseph's
- Conference: A-10
- Record: 428–447–1

Biographical details
- Born: March 11, 1966 (age 60); Abington, Pennsylvania, U.S.

Playing career
- 1985–1986: Virginia Tech
- 1987–1988: Ithaca
- 1990: Spartanburg Phillies
- Position: Catcher

Coaching career (HC unless noted)
- 1992–1994: Cornell (assistant)
- 1995: New Mexico State (assistant)
- 1995: Cal Poly Pomona (assistant)
- 1996: Georgia (assistant)
- 1997–2000: Ithaca (asst.)
- 2001–2008: Army (assistant)
- 2009–present: Saint Joseph's

Head coaching record
- Overall: 428–447–1
- Tournaments: A-10: 10–13; NCAA: 0–0

Accomplishments and honors

Championships
- 2x A-10 regular season (2023, 2026)

Awards
- 3× A-10 Coach of the Year (2014, 2023, 2026)

Charles David "Fritz" Hamburg is an American college baseball coach and former catcher. Hamburg is the head coach of the Saint Joseph's Hawks baseball team.

== Playing career ==
Hamburg attended The Hill School in Pottstown, Pennsylvania. After graduating from The Hill School, Hamburg enrolled at Virginia Polytechnic Institute and State University where he would play for the Virginia Tech Hokies baseball team. After two years at Virginia Tech, Hamburg transferred to Ithaca College. While at Ithaca, he was named a Third Team All-American in 1988, while leading the Bombers to a National Championship.

Following graduation, Hamburg signed with the Philadelphia Phillies and was assigned to the Spartanburg Phillies. Hamburg had a .194 batting average, .358 on base percentage, seven doubles, and 7 RBIs.

== Coaching career ==
Hamburg began his coaching career as an assistant for the Cornell Big Red baseball team. After two years, Hamburg moved on to be an assistant at New Mexico State and Cal Poly Pomona. Hamburg spent the 1996 season at Georgia before rejoining his alma mater Ithaca as an assistant from 1997 to 2000. Hamburg then moved on to being an assistant for the Army Black Knights baseball team. In 2007, he was named the ABCA/Baseball America Assistant Coach of the Year.

On August 26, 2008, Hamburg was named the head coach of the Saint Joseph's Hawks baseball program.

== Head coaching record ==
Record table
Season	Team	Overall	Conference	Standing	Postseason
Saint Joseph's Hawks (Atlantic 10 Conference) (2009–present)
2009	Saint Joseph's	16–30–1	9–17	T-11th	
2010	Saint Joseph's	18–29	13–14	T-8th	
2011	Saint Joseph's	21–31	11–13	9th	
2012	Saint Joseph's	25–32	13–10	6th	A-10 Tournament
2013	Saint Joseph's	26–26	12–12	T-8th	
2014	Saint Joseph's	35–16	18–8	2nd	A-10 Tournament
2015	Saint Joseph's	21–28	11–12	11th	
2016	Saint Joseph's	31–23	15–9	T-3rd	A-10 Tournament
2017	Saint Joseph's	21–25	12–12	8th	
2018	Saint Joseph's	21–27	7–15	10th	
2019	Saint Joseph's	21–28	13–11	T-7th	
2020	Saint Joseph's	5–10	0–0		Season canceled due to COVID-19
2021	Saint Joseph's	21–19	15–9	T-2nd (North)	A-10 Tournament
2022	Saint Joseph's	29–25	12–11	6th	A-10 Tournament
2023	Saint Joseph's	28–24	17–7	1st	A-10 Tournament
2024	Saint Joseph's	29–26	13–11	T–4th	A-10 Tournament
2025	Saint Joseph's	24–28	17–13	5th	A-10 Tournament
2026	Saint Joseph's	36–20	25–5	1st	A-10 Tournament
Saint Joseph's:		428–447–1	233–189		
Total:		428–447–1			
National champion Postseason invitational champion Conference regular season champion Conference regular season and conference tournament champion Division regular season champion Division regular season and conference tournament champion Conference tournament champion

== See also ==
- List of current NCAA Division I baseball coaches
