= Mik Aoki =

American baseball player and coach

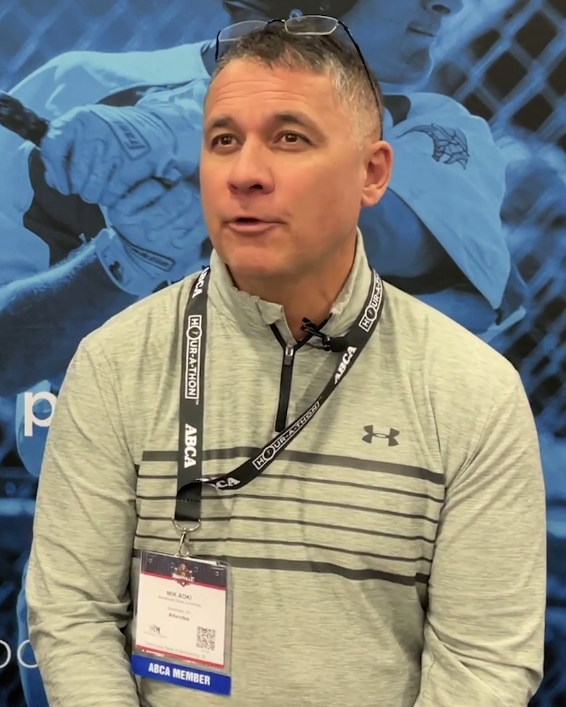
- Aoki in 2023

Current position
- Title: Head coach
- Team: Richmond
- Conference: Atlantic 10
- Record: 93–75

Biographical details
- Born: October 7, 1968 (age 58); Yokohama, Japan
- Education: Davidson '90

Playing career
- 1987–1990: Davidson
- Positions: C, 2B, 3B

Coaching career (HC unless noted)
- 1992: Manchester CC
- 1993–1994: Ohio (asst.)
- 1995–1998: Dartmouth (asst.)
- 1999–2003: Columbia
- 2004–2006: Boston College (asst.)
- 2007–2010: Boston College
- 2011–2019: Notre Dame
- 2020–2023: Morehead State
- 2024–present: Richmond

Head coaching record
- Overall: 634–656–2
- Tournaments: NCAA: 2–4

Accomplishments and honors

Championships
- OVC Regular season (2023)

Awards
- OVC Coach of the Year (2023)

Mikio Aoki (born October 7, 1968) is a Japanese-American college baseball coach and former player, who is the current head coach at the University of Richmond. Aoki played at Davidson College for coach Jim Stoeckel. Aoki previously coached for the Columbia Lions, Boston College Eagles, Notre Dame Fighting Irish, and Morehead State Eagles.

== Early life ==
Aoki was born in Yokohama, Japan, and raised in Plymouth, Massachusetts. He attended Milton Academy prior to enrolling at Davidson College. Aoki earned four varsity letters while starting for three seasons for the Wildcats at catcher, second base, and third base. He was a prolific hitter and still ranks among career leaders in several offensive categories. Aoki hit two grand slams in 1988, one of just six Davidson players to hit two in one season. He played one professional season for HCAW in the Netherlands in 1991.

== Coaching career ==
Aoki began his coaching career as head coach at Manchester Community College in Manchester, Connecticut. After one season, he became an assistant at Ohio, where he stayed for two years and earned a master's degree. He then moved to Dartmouth for four seasons before landing his first Division I head coaching job at Ivy League Columbia. In his five seasons, the Lions were 87–140, including twenty or more wins in each of Aoki's last three seasons. Columbia had not won twenty or more games in a season since 1987.

Aoki left Columbia to become the pitching coach at Boston College for the 2004 season; he was promoted to head coach at the start of the 2007 season. In 2005, BC won a school record 37 games. In 2009, Aoki led the team to its first NCAA tournament since 1967.

Aoki became head coach at Notre Dame in 2011. On June 8, 2019, Notre Dame announced that they would not renew Aoki's contract for the 2020 season.

On July 3, 2019, Aoki was named the head baseball coach at Morehead State University.

On June 22, 2023, Aoki was named the head baseball coach at the University of Richmond.

== Head coaching record ==
The below table shows Aoki's yearly records as an NCAA head baseball coach.

Record table
Season	Team	Overall	Conference	Standing	Postseason
Columbia Lions (Ivy League) (1999–2003)
1999	Columbia	13–27	7–13	2nd (Gehrig)	
2000	Columbia	11–34	6–14	4th (Gehrig)	
2001	Columbia	20–27	10–10	2nd (Gehrig)	
2002	Columbia	22–25	10–10	3rd (Gehrig)	
2003	Columbia	21–27	9–11	T-3rd (Gehrig)	
Columbia:		87–140	42–58		
Boston College Eagles (Atlantic Coast Conference) (2007–2010)
2007	Boston College	24–27–1	12–17	5th (Atlantic)	
2008	Boston College	26–27	9–21	T-5th (Atlantic)	
2009	Boston College	34–26	13–15	3rd (Atlantic)	NCAA Regional
2010	Boston College	30–28	14–16	4th (Atlantic)	
Boston College:		114–108–1	48–69		
Notre Dame Fighting Irish (Big East Conference) (2011–2013)
2011	Notre Dame	23–29–1	13–13	8th	
2012	Notre Dame	31–27	14–13	7th	
2013	Notre Dame	34–24	10–14	7th	
Notre Dame Fighting Irish (Atlantic Coast Conference) (2014–2019)
2014	Notre Dame	22–31	9–21	7th (Atlantic)	
2015	Notre Dame	37–23	17–13	T-2nd (Atlantic)	NCAA Regional
2016	Notre Dame	27–27	11–17	7th (Atlantic)	
2017	Notre Dame	26–32	10–20	7th (Atlantic)	
2018	Notre Dame	24–30	12–18	6th (Atlantic)	
2019	Notre Dame	24–30	13–17	6th (Atlantic)	
Notre Dame:		248–253–1	109–146		
Morehead State Eagles (Ohio Valley Conference) (2020–2023)
2020	Morehead State	5–10	0–3		Season canceled due to COVID-19
2021	Morehead State	24–23	13–14	3rd	Ohio Valley tournament
2022	Morehead State	27–27	14–10	3rd	Ohio Valley tournament
2023	Morehead State	36–20	16–7	1st	Ohio Valley tournament
Morehead State:		92–80	43–31		
Richmond Spiders (Atlantic 10 Conference) (2024–present)
2024	Richmond	27–32	13–11	T–4th	A-10 Tournament
2025	Richmond	33–19	14–16	T–7th	
2026	Richmond	33–24	20–10	T–2nd	A-10 Tournament
Richmond:		93–75	47–37		
Total:		634–656–2			
National champion Postseason invitational champion Conference regular season champion Conference regular season and conference tournament champion Division regular season champion Division regular season and conference tournament champion Conference tournament champion
