= 2026 Richmond Spiders baseball team =

American college baseball season

2026 Richmond Spiders baseball
- Conference: Atlantic 10 Conference
- Record: 33–22 (20–10 A-10)
- Head coach: Mik Aoki (3rd season)
- Assistant coaches: Nate Mulberg (10th season); Eric Hill (3rd season)
- Hitting coach: Collin Radack (9th season)
- Pitching coach: Josh Epstein (4th season)
- Home stadium: Malcolm U. Pitt Field

2026 Atlantic 10 Conference baseball standings
	Conf.						Overall
Team	W		L		T	PCT	W		L		T	PCT
Saint Joseph's ‍†‍‍	25	–	5	–	0	.833	35	–	18	–	0	.660
Richmond ‍‍‍	20	–	10	–	0	.667	33	–	22	–	0	.600
VCU ‍‍‡‍^{y}	20	–	10	–	0	.667	37	–	23	–	0	.617
George Mason ‍‍‍	18	–	12	–	0	.600	28	–	24	–	0	.538
Davidson ‍‍‍	16	–	14	–	0	.533	25	–	26	–	0	.490
Rhode Island ‍‍‍	16	–	14	–	0	.533	23	–	29	–	0	.442
Dayton ‍‍‍	15	–	15	–	0	.500	31	–	23	–	0	.574
Fordham ‍‍‍	15	–	15	–	0	.500	25	–	30	–	0	.455
Saint Louis ‍‍‍	11	–	19	–	0	.367	20	–	34	–	0	.370
George Washington ‍‍‍	9	–	21	–	0	.300	18	–	35	–	0	.340
La Salle ‍‍‍	8	–	22	–	0	.267	24	–	31	–	0	.436
St. Bonaventure ‍‍‍	7	–	23	–	0	.233	13	–	36	–	1	.270
† – Conference champion ‡ – Tournament champion y – Invited to the NCAA tournament As of May 17, 2026; Rankings from D1Baseball

The 2026 Richmond Spiders baseball team represents University of Richmond during the 2025 NCAA Division I baseball season. The Spiders play their home games at Malcolm U. Pitt Field as a member of the Atlantic 10 Conference. They will be led by second-year head coach Mik Aoki.

== Preseason ==
=== Coaches poll ===
The coaches poll was released on February 13, 2026. Richmond was selected to finish fifth.

Coaches' Poll
Predicted finish	Team	Points
1	Rhode Island	136 (5)
2	George Mason	122 (4)
T−3	Saint Joseph's	98 (1)
T−3	Saint Louis	98
T−5	Dayton	83 (1)
T−5	Richmond	83
7	Davidson	77
8	VCU	71 (1)
9	George Washington	68
10	Fordham	56
11	St. Bonaventure	24
12	La Salle	20

== Rankings ==
Ranking movements Legend: — = Not ranked
	Week																
Poll	Pre	1	2	3	4	5	6	7	8	9	10	11	12	13	14	15	Final
Coaches'	—	—*	—	—	—	—	—	—	—	—	—	—					
Baseball America	—	—	—	—	—	—	—	—	—	—	—	—					
NCBWA†	—	—	—	—	—	—	—	—	—	—	—	—					
D1Baseball	—	—	—	—	—	—	—	—	—	—	—	—					
Perfect Game	—	—	—	—	—	—	—	—	—	—	—	—					

† NCBWA ranks 30 teams in their preseason poll, but only ranks 25 teams weekly during the season.
* A new poll was not released for this week, so for comparison purposes, the previous week's ranking is inserted in this week's slot.
