= Liberty Bell Classic (baseball) =

- Liberty Bell Classic logo
- Sport: Baseball
- Founded: 1992
- No. of teams: 8
- Venues: Citizens Bank Park (2004–Present); Veterans Stadium (1992–2003)
- Most recent champion: Saint Joseph's University
- Most titles: University of Delaware (9)

The Liberty Bell Classic was conceived in 1992 as a way for local Philadelphia-area Division I colleges to compete against each other in a tournament, as well as an opportunity for the schools to play on the big league field of Veterans Stadium. The original eight schools were Drexel University, La Salle University, Saint Joseph's University, Temple University, University of Delaware, University of Pennsylvania, Villanova University, and West Chester University. In the first championship game, Delaware defeated Villanova 6–2.

When West Chester was reclassified as Division II, it was replaced by Rider University, which was then in turn replaced by Lehigh University. When Drexel's baseball program was dissolved after the 2003 season, Lafayette College joined the Liberty Bell Classic.

Originally all games were played at Veterans Stadium but with the closure of Veterans Stadium, starting in 2004, games are now played at local venues with the championship game being held at Citizens Bank Park. The first championship at Citizens Bank Park was claimed by Lehigh as they defeated Villanova 11–3.

A second tournament, the Bill Giles Invitational, was created in 2001 for the Philadelphia-area Division II colleges. Competing in the Giles Invitational is previous Liberty Bell competitor West Chester University, along with Philadelphia University, University of the Sciences, and Wilmington University. The championship games for the Bill Giles Invitational and Liberty Bell Classic are hosted as part of a double header.

== Champions ==
- 1992 – Delaware
- 1993 – Drexel
- 1994 – Delaware
- 1995 – Delaware
- 1996 – Temple
- 1997 – Delaware
- 1998 – Villanova
- 1999 – Villanova
- 2000 – Temple
- 2001 – Delaware
- 2002 – Delaware
- 2003 – Temple
- 2004 – Lehigh
- 2005 – Villanova
- 2006 – La Salle
- 2007 – Lafayette
- 2008 – Lafayette
- 2009 – (no champion, due to inclement weather)
- 2010 – Delaware
- 2011 – Villanova
- 2012 – Saint Joseph's
- 2013 – Delaware
- 2014 – Saint Joseph's
- 2015 – Rider
- 2016 – Saint Joseph's
- 2017 – La Salle
- 2018 – Lafayette
- 2019 – Lafayette
- 2020 – (no champion, due to COVID-19 pandemic)
- 2021 – (no champion, due to COVID-19 pandemic)
- 2022 – Villanova
- 2023 – Rider
- 2024 – Delaware
- 2025 – (no champion, game not held)
- 2026 – Saint Joseph’s

== Championships by school ==
- 9 – Delaware
- 5 – Villanova
- 4 – Saint Joseph's
- 3 – Temple
- 2 – La Salle
- 2 – Lafayette
- 1 – Lehigh
- 1 – Drexel
- 2 – Rider
- 0 – Penn
- 0 – West Chester

== Bill Giles Invitational ==
The Bill Giles Invitational (BGI)—named for Philadelphia Phillies chairman emeritus Bill Giles—was begun in 2001, for the NCAA Division II baseball teams in the Philadelphia area.

=== BGI champions ===
See footnote.

- 2001 – Philadelphia
- 2002 – Philadelphia
- 2003 – West Chester
- 2004 – West Chester
- 2005 – West Chester
- 2006 – West Chester
- 2007 – Wilmington
- 2008 – West Chester
- 2009 – West Chester
- 2010 – West Chester
- 2011 – West Chester
- 2012 – West Chester
- 2013 – Philadelphia
- 2014 – Wilmington
- 2015 – West Chester
- 2016 – West Chester
- 2017 – West Chester
- 2018 – Wilmington
- 2019 – Wilmington
- 2020 – (no champion, due to COVID-19 pandemic)
- 2021 – (no champion, due to COVID-19 pandemic)
- 2022 – West Chester
- 2023 – West Chester
- 2024 – West Chester

=== BGI championships by school ===
- 15 – West Chester
- 4 – Wilmington
- 3 – Philadelphia
- 0 – University of the Sciences
