= Old Batesburg-Leesville High School =

- U.S. National Register of Historic Places
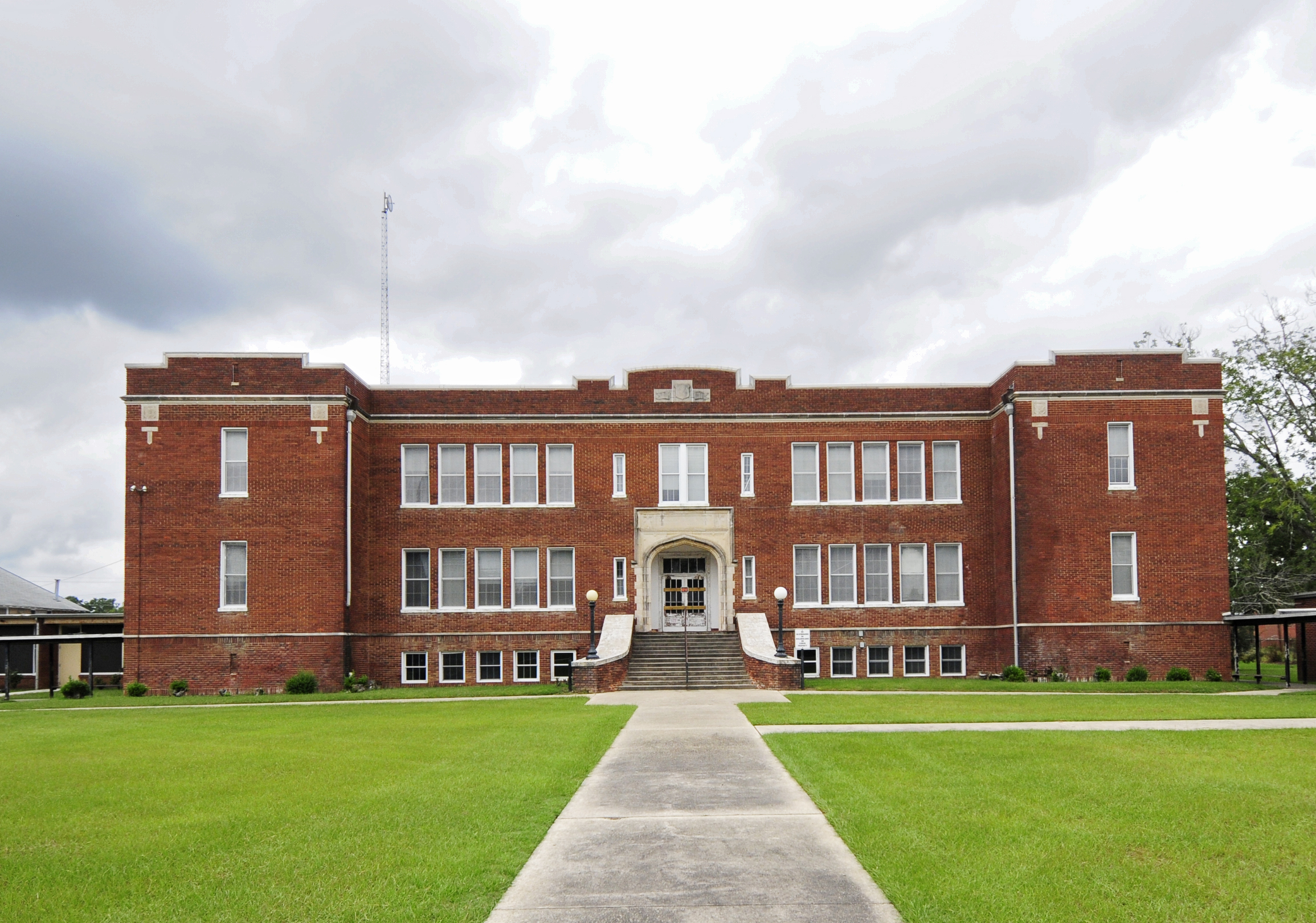
- Old Batesburg-Leesville High School, August 2012

- Location within South Carolina Location within the United States
- Location: Columbia Ave at Shealy Rd, Batesburg-Leesville, South Carolina
- Coordinates: 33°54′41″N 81°31′47″W
- Area: less than one acre
- Built: 1920
- Built by: Scruggs & Ewing; Palmer-Spivey Co.
- Architectural style: Tudor Revival
- MPS: Batesburg-Leesville MRA
- NRHP reference No.: 82003893
- Added to NRHP: July 6, 1982

The Old Batesburg-Leesville High School, also called Batesburg-Leesville Middle School, was a historic school building located in Batesburg-Leesville, Lexington County, South Carolina. Built in 1921, the two-story, red brick structure, set on a raised basement, was designed in the Tudor Gothic Revival style. Notable features included a low parapet roof banded in concrete, flanking pavilions, and a Tudor arched entranceway.

It was listed on the National Register of Historic Places in 1982.

The building was demolished in August 2017 due to vandalism, asbestos concerns, and plumbing issues.
