= Northside Christian School (North Charleston, South Carolina) =

Location
- 7800 Northside Dr. North Charleston, South Carolina 29420; United States; 32.9442°N 80.0547°W

Information
- Type: Private Christian
- Religious affiliation: Baptist
- Established: 1975
- Gender: Coeducational
- Colors: Blue and Gold
- Mascot: Flying bald eagle
- Website: northsidecharleston.com

Northside Christian School is a private Christian school in North Charleston, South Carolina, United States. It is a ministry of Northside Baptist Church and was founded in 1975 by Dr. Garth Sibert. Northside has more than 300 students in grades K3-12. There is also a Toddler 1-2 program. There are 786 alumni serving in ministry, the military, education, and in professions such as dentistry, medicine, law, and engineering.

Northside is accredited by the South Carolina Association of Christian Schools and is a long-time member of the Tri-County Admissions Council, an association of independent schools in the tri-county area.

The school colors are royal blue and gold, its mascot is a bald eagle. "Northside Eagle" is displayed on athletic and school uniforms.

The school's Bible verse is Isaiah 40:31.
