= Richmond Spiders baseball =

- 2026 Richmond Spiders baseball team
- Founded: 1915
- University: University of Richmond
- Head coach: Mik Aoki (3rd season)
- Conference: Atlantic 10
- Location: Richmond, Virginia
- Home stadium: Malcolm U. Pitt Field (Capacity: 600)
- Nickname: Spiders
- Colors: Blue and red

NCAA regional champions
- 2002

NCAA tournament appearances
- 1972, 1986, 1995, 1997, 1998, 1999, 2002, 2003

Conference regular season champions
- 1972, 1986, 1997, 1998, 2003

The Richmond Spiders baseball team represents the University of Richmond in National Collegiate Athletic Association (NCAA) Division I. The Spiders compete in the Atlantic 10 (A-10) conference. The Spiders play their home games at Malcolm U. Pitt Field, which is located on the main campus in Richmond, Virginia. They are currently coached by head coach Mik Aoki.

== History ==
The Richmond Spiders baseball team began play in 1915. In their history, the Spiders have played in the NCAA tournament 8 times, advancing to the Super Regionals in 2002. Mik Aoki has served as head coach since 2024.

== Richmond in the NCAA tournament ==
Year	Coach	Record	Notes
1972	Chuck Boone	0–2	Eliminated by Florida State in District 3
1986	Ron Atkins	0–2	Eliminated by Oregon State in the Midwest Regional
1995	Ron Atkins	1–2	Eliminated by Alabama in the East Regional
1997	Ron Atkins	1–2	Eliminated by Florida in the Atlantic Regional
1998	Ron Atkins	1–2	Eliminated by Florida in the East Regional
1999	Ron Atkins	3–2	Eliminated by Wake Forest in the Winston-Salem Regional
2002	Ron Atkins	4–3	Winston-Salem Regional Champions, Eliminated by Nebraska in the Lincoln Super Regional
2003	Ron Atkins	2–2	Eliminated by Stanford in the Palo Alto Regional
Totals		12–17	8 Appearances

== Coaching history ==
Tenure	Coach	Seasons	Record	Pct.
1915–1933	Frank Dobson	19	160–103–2	.608
1934	Dave Miller	1	12–7	.632
1935–1971	Malcolm Pitt	37	426–257–5	.623
1972–1976	Chuck Boone	5	96–56	.632
1977–1984	Tommy Gilman	8	167–128–1	.566
1985–2007	Ron Atkins	23	717–540–4	.570
2007–2013	Mark McQueen	6	156–161–4	.492
2014–2023	Tracy Woodson	10	238–245–2	.493
2024–present	Mik Aoki	1	27–32	.458
Totals	9 coaches	110 seasons	1,999–1,529–18	.566

== Alumni in MLB ==
- Andy Allanson - 1986–1989, 1991–1993, 1995
- Mark Budzinski - 2003
- Lew Burdette - 1950–1967
- Sean Casey - 1997–2008
- Vinny Capra - 2022-present
- Lou Ciola - 1943
- Herb Hash - 1940–1941
- Bucky Jacobs - 1937, 1939–1940
- Brian Jordan - 1992–2006
- Joe Mahoney - 2012–2013
- Renie Martin - 1979–1984
- Tom Miller - 1918–1919
- Vern Morgan - 1954–1955
- Jack Sanford - 1940–1941, 1946
- Mike Smith - 2002, 2006
- Tim Stauffer - 2005–2007, 2009–2014
- Porter Vaughan - 1940–1941, 1946
