= 2026 Atlantic 10 Conference baseball tournament =

American college baseball tournament

- Teams: 6
- Format: Double-elimination
- Finals site: Capital One Park; Tysons, Virginia
- Champions: VCU (5th title)
- Winning coach: Sean Thompson (1st title)
- MVP: Jacob Lee (VCU)
- Television: ESPN+

2026 Atlantic 10 Conference baseball standings
	Conf.						Overall
Team	W		L		T	PCT	W		L		T	PCT
Saint Joseph's ‍†‍‍	25	–	5	–	0	.833	35	–	18	–	0	.660
Richmond ‍‍‍	20	–	10	–	0	.667	33	–	22	–	0	.600
VCU ‍‍‡‍^{y}	20	–	10	–	0	.667	37	–	23	–	0	.617
George Mason ‍‍‍	18	–	12	–	0	.600	28	–	24	–	0	.538
Davidson ‍‍‍	16	–	14	–	0	.533	25	–	26	–	0	.490
Rhode Island ‍‍‍	16	–	14	–	0	.533	23	–	29	–	0	.442
Dayton ‍‍‍	15	–	15	–	0	.500	31	–	23	–	0	.574
Fordham ‍‍‍	15	–	15	–	0	.500	25	–	30	–	0	.455
Saint Louis ‍‍‍	11	–	19	–	0	.367	20	–	34	–	0	.370
George Washington ‍‍‍	9	–	21	–	0	.300	18	–	35	–	0	.340
La Salle ‍‍‍	8	–	22	–	0	.267	24	–	31	–	0	.436
St. Bonaventure ‍‍‍	7	–	23	–	0	.233	13	–	36	–	1	.270
† – Conference champion ‡ – Tournament champion y – Invited to the NCAA tournament As of May 17, 2026; Rankings from D1Baseball

The 2026 Atlantic 10 Conference baseball tournament was the 48th edition of the tournament, which took place at Capital One Park in Tysons, Virginia. The tournament was a double-elimination tournament, and began on May 20 and conclude on May 23 and determined the champion for the 2026 NCAA Division I baseball season.

Rhode Island we’re the defending champion, after defeating George Mason in the 2025 championship. The VCU Rams won their fifth Atlantic 10 baseball championship after beating Rhode Island 9–1. Jacob Lee was award the tournament's Most Outstanding Player award.

== Seeding and format ==
The tournament will feature the top 6 finishers from the round-robin regular season, as determined by conference winning percentage. The top two finishers will earn a single bye, with the remaining four seeds meeting in the first round.

== Bracket ==
Upper round 1	Upper round 2	Upper final	Final
1	Saint Joseph's	9
4	George Mason	8	5	Rhode Island	17
5	Rhode Island	19	5	Rhode Island	5
3	VCU	4
2	Richmond	4
3	VCU	7	3	VCU	7
6	Davidson	4
5	Rhode Island	16
3	VCU	18	9
Lower round 1	Lower round 2	Lower round 3	Lower final
.	1	Saint Joseph's	3
1	Saint Joseph's	14	3	VCU	13
4	George Mason	11	4	George Mason	4
4	George Mason	9	2	Richmond	6
6	Davidson	1

== Schedule ==
Game	Time*	Matchup^{#}	Score	Notes	Reference
Wednesday, May 20
1	11:00 am	No. 5 Rhode Island vs No. 4 George Mason	19–8		
2	3:00 pm	No. 6 Davidson vs No. 3 VCU	4–7		
Thursday, May 21
3	9:00 am	No. 4 George Mason vs No. 6 Davidson	9–1	Davidson Eliminated	
4	12:30 pm	No. 5 Rhode Island vs No. 1 Saint Joseph's	17–9		
Friday, May 22
5	9:00 am	No. 3 VCU vs No. 2 Richmond	7–4		
6	11:00 am	No. 4 George Mason vs No. 2 Richmond	11–6	Richmond Eliminated	
7	2:30 pm	No. 5 Rhode Island vs No. 3 VCU	5–4		
8	6:00 pm	No. 4 George Mason vs No. 1 Saint Joseph's	4–14	George Mason Eliminated	
9	9:30 pm	No. 3 VCU vs No. 1 Saint Joseph's	13–3	Saint Joseph's Eliminated	
Saturday, May 23
10	12:00 pm	No. 5 Rhode Island vs No. 3 VCU	16–18		
11	30 minutes following game 10	No. 5 Rhode Island vs No. 3 VCU	1–9	Rhode Island Eliminated	

=== Game Summaries ===
==== May 20 ====
May 20; 11:00 a.m. ET; Game 1	(5) Rhode Island	19–8	(4) George Mason	Capital One Park; Attendance: 603; Umpires: HP: Tim Carey, 1B: Kevin Conder, 2B: Brian McGugan, 3B: Tony Turk
May 20; 11:00 a.m. ET; Game 1	WP: Parker Aikens (2–1)	Boxscore	LP: Jake Drumm (4–3)	Capital One Park; Attendance: 603; Umpires: HP: Tim Carey, 1B: Kevin Conder, 2B: Brian McGugan, 3B: Tony Turk
May 20; 11:00 a.m. ET; Game 1	HR: A. Botti (1), S. Penney (3), R. King (9), R. Moroney (3), A. Botti (2)	Boxscore		Capital One Park; Attendance: 603; Umpires: HP: Tim Carey, 1B: Kevin Conder, 2B: Brian McGugan, 3B: Tony Turk

May 20; 3:00 p.m. ET; Game 2	(3) VCU	7–4	(6) Davidson	Capital One Park; Attendance: 603; Umpires: HP: Stephen McMullen, 1B: Alan Gorewitz, 2B: Richard Katz, 3B: Mike Cerr
May 20; 3:00 p.m. ET; Game 2	LP: Zach Peters (6–1)	Boxscore	WP: Simon Yochum (7–1)	Capital One Park; Attendance: 603; Umpires: HP: Stephen McMullen, 1B: Alan Gorewitz, 2B: Richard Katz, 3B: Mike Cerr
May 20; 3:00 p.m. ET; Game 2	HR: H. Prather (14), E. Kodama (1)	Boxscore	HR: A. Torreso (13)	Capital One Park; Attendance: 603; Umpires: HP: Stephen McMullen, 1B: Alan Gorewitz, 2B: Richard Katz, 3B: Mike Cerr

==== May 21 ====
May 21; 9:00 a.m. ET (Note: Postponed from May 20 at 7:00 p.m. due to inclement weather.); Game 3	(4) George Mason	9–1	(6) Davidson	Capital One Park; Umpires: HP: Kevin Conder, 1B: Tim Carey, 2B: Tony Turk, 3B: Brian McGugan
