= Sean Thompson (baseball) =

American baseball coach (born 1995)

Current position
- Title: Head coach
- Team: VCU
- Conference: Atlantic 10
- Record: 55–62

Biographical details
- Born: September 8, 1995 (age 31)

Playing career
- 2015–2018: VCU
- 2018–2020: Great Falls Voyagers
- Position: Pitcher

Coaching career (HC unless noted)
- 2021: VCU (pit.)
- 2022: Monmouth (pit.)
- 2023: FIU (asst.)
- 2024: VCU (asst.)
- 2025–present: VCU

Head coaching record
- Overall: 55–62
- Tournaments: A-10: 5–1; NCAA: 1–2

Accomplishments and honors

Championships
- A–10 Conference Tournament (2026)

Sean Thompson (born September 8, 1995) is an American baseball coach who currently coaches the VCU Rams baseball program. Prior to VCU, he served as an assistant coach at VCU, Florida International University, and as a pitching coach for Monmouth University. Thompson played collegiate baseball at VCU and briefly played as a professional for the Great Falls Voyagers.

At 30 years old, Thompson is the youngest head coach in NCAA Division I baseball.

== Career ==
=== Playing ===
Thompson began his collegiate baseball career at VCU in 2015. Over four seasons (2015–2018), he emerged as one of the most accomplished pitchers in program history. As a freshman, Thompson earned a spot on the Atlantic 10 All-Rookie Team, contributing significantly to VCU's success. He compiled a 27–10 record and a 3.30 ERA across 300 innings, striking out 249 batters. His 27 career wins rank second all-time in VCU history.

A defining moment of Thompson's college career came in 2015 when he pitched 5.1 innings of one-run baseball to secure VCU's victory over Dallas Baptist in the NCAA Regional Championship—the program's first. His standout performances solidified his legacy within the program.

Upon graduating in 2018, Thompson signed as an undrafted free agent with the Chicago White Sox organization. He began his professional career in the Arizona Rookie League before advancing to the Great Falls Voyagers in 2019. During his time with the Voyagers, Thompson made 14 starts, amassing 80 innings pitched with 66 strikeouts.

Following his professional playing career, Thompson transitioned into coaching. He worked with Flood City Elite travel baseball as an assistant coach and also served as an assistant for Paul Carpenter's All-American Amateur Baseball Association team, where he contributed to a remarkable 32–2 season record.

=== Coaching ===
Thompson returned to VCU in 2021 as the Director of Pitching Development. During this stint, he helped shape a promising Rams pitching staff, leading to Atlantic-10 All-Rookie Team selections for Tyler Davis and Mason Delane.

In 2022, Thompson joined Monmouth University as the pitching coach. Under his guidance, the Hawks achieved the top ERA in the Metro Atlantic Athletic Conference (MAAC), along with the second-most strikeouts and second-fewest walks in the league. Thompson played a key role in developing Trey Dombroski, who enjoyed a historic season with 120 strikeouts—the most in program history—and a 3.13 ERA. Dombroski received several accolades, including unanimous MAAC Pitcher of the Year, Collegiate Baseball Second Team All-American, and ABCA Third Team All-American. He was later selected in the fourth round of the 2022 MLB draft by the Houston Astros. Another Monmouth pitcher, Rob Hensey, was drafted in the ninth round by the Cincinnati Reds.

In 2023, Thompson joined Florida International University as an assistant coach under first-year head coach Rich Whitten, a former VCU assistant. Thompson contributed to a five-win improvement for the Panthers during the season.

Thompson rejoined VCU for the 2024 season as the pitching coach. That year, he led the Rams' pitching staff to achieve the best ERA in the Atlantic 10 Conference. His efforts helped propel the team to a conference championship and an NCAA Tournament appearance. Thompson was instrumental in the development of All-Atlantic 10 Conference pitchers Christian Gordon and Brian Curley, who were drafted by the Chicago Cubs and Pittsburgh Pirates, respectively, in the 2024 MLB draft.

Following the departure of Bradley LeCroy to Liberty University, Thompson was hired full-time as the head coach.

=== Heading coaching record ===
Record table
Season	Team	Overall	Conference	Standing	Postseason
VCU Rams (Atlantic 10 Conference) (2025–present)
2025	VCU	17–37	10–20	11th	
2026	VCU	38–25	20–10	T–2nd	NCAA Regional
VCU:		55–62	30–30		
Total:		55–62			
National champion Postseason invitational champion Conference regular season champion Conference regular season and conference tournament champion Division regular season champion Division regular season and conference tournament champion Conference tournament champion
