= King's College (Charlotte, North Carolina) =

Coordinates: 35.2133°N 80.8222°W

- Motto: Finish First
- Type: Private for-profit college
- Active: 1901–2018
- President: Diane Ryon
- Students: 1,870
- Location: Charlotte, North Carolina, North Carolina, U.S.
- Colors: Red and White
- Website: www.kingscollegecharlotte.edu

King's College was a private for-profit college in Charlotte, North Carolina. It was founded in 1901 and over half of students came from the Charlotte area. There was also on-campus housing for students. King's College awarded both diplomas and associate degrees. The college closed in December 2018 due to low enrollment.

== Academics ==
King's College provided 8-12 month courses and offered ten major areas of study in three categories: Business, Technology, and Health care. Associate degree programs could be completed in 16 months.

According to Peterson's King's College had 1,024 applicants, of which 78% were admitted, producing an undergraduate population of 501. According to College Navigator, the last graduation/transfer out rate was 79%.

== Accreditation ==
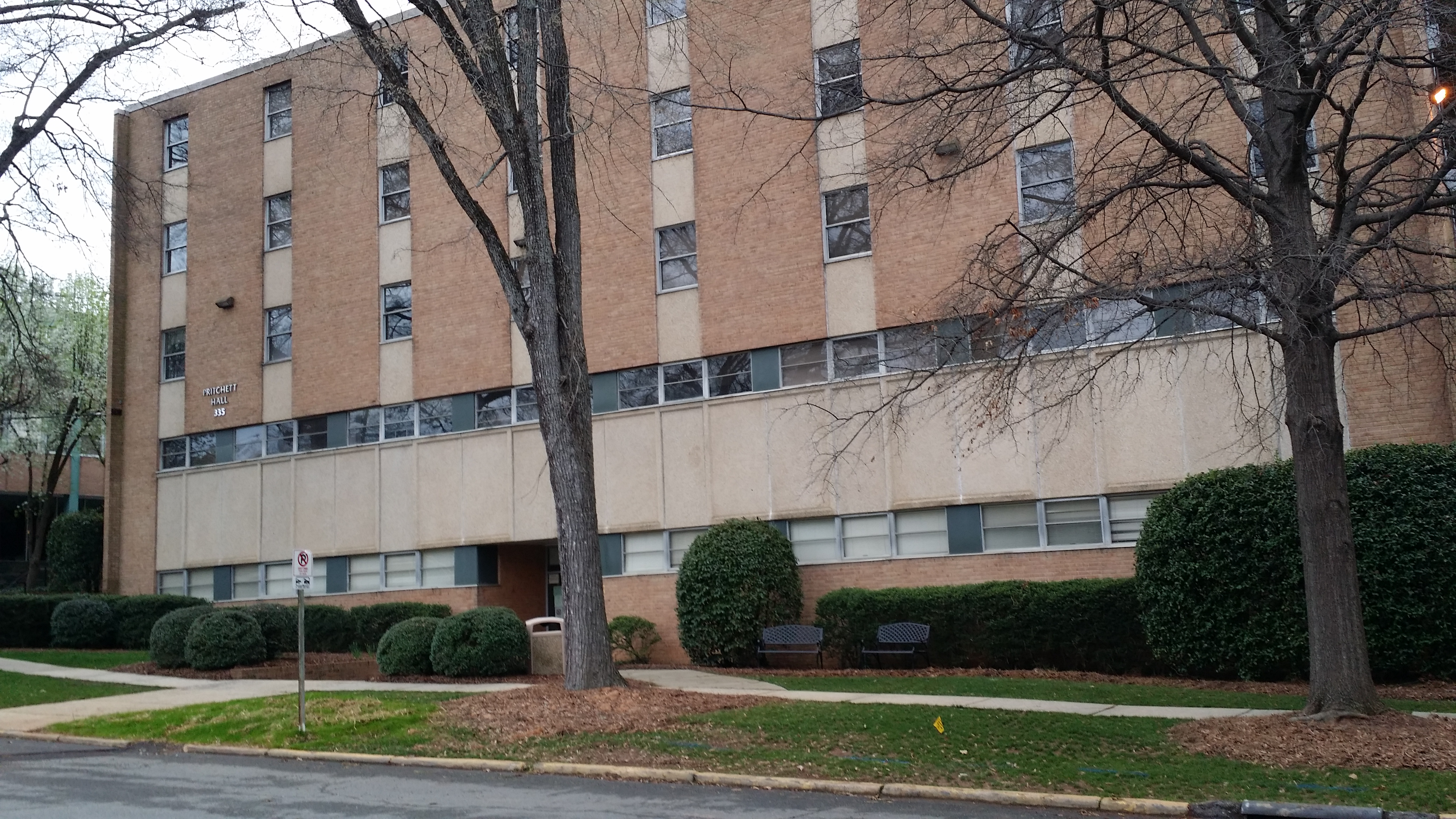
Pritchett Hall at King's College

King's College was accredited by the Accrediting Council for Independent Colleges and Schools to award diplomas and associate degrees. The Medical Assisting Program was accredited by the Commission on Accreditation of Allied Health Education Programs.
