= Malcolm U. Pitt Field =

Baseball venue in Richmond, Virginia

- Pitt Field
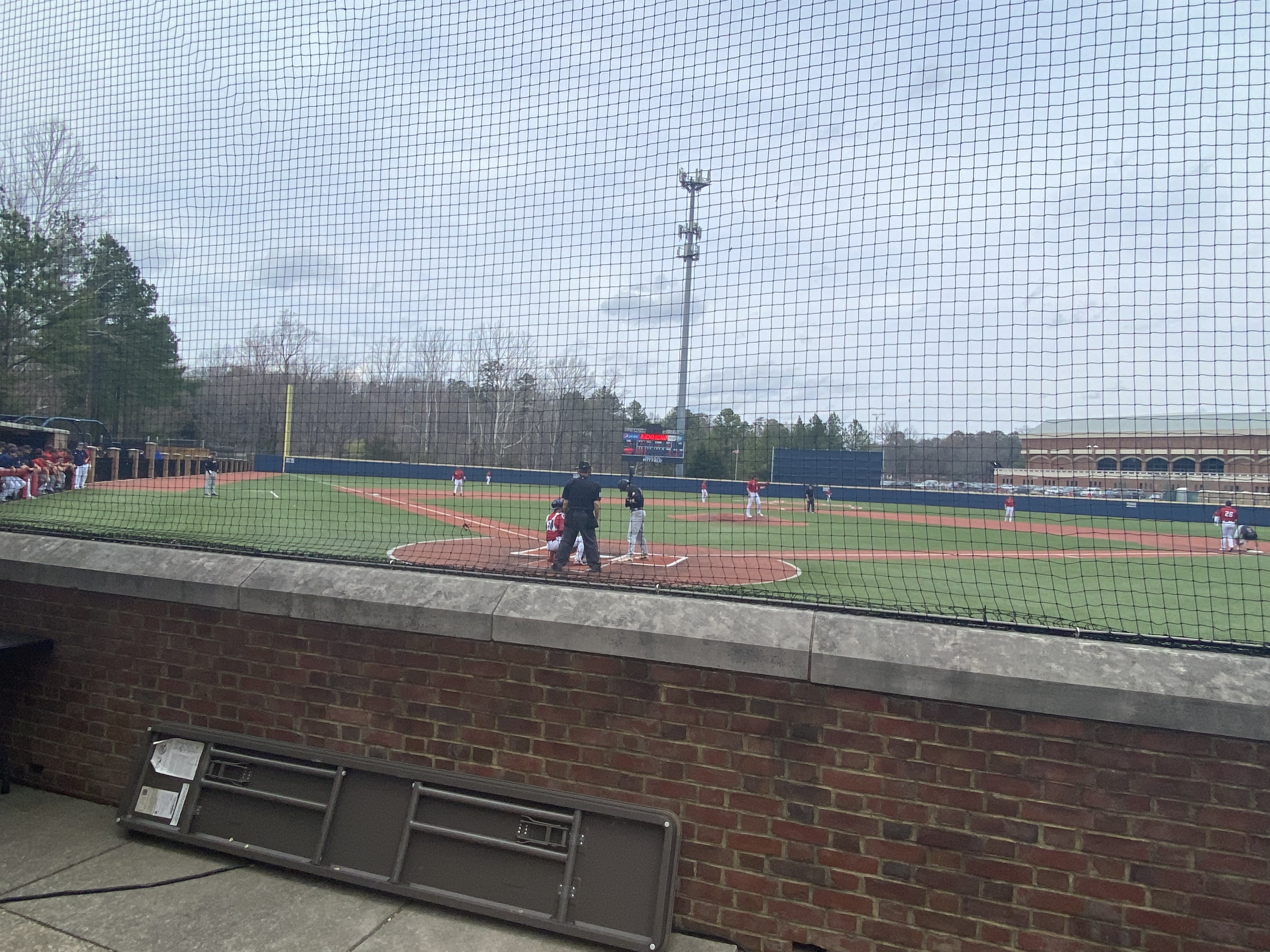
- Interactive map of Malcolm U. Pitt Field
- Address: 311 College Road, Richmond, VA 23173
- Location: University of Richmond campus; Lakeview Lane, Richmond, Virginia, USA
- Coordinates: 37.578841°N 77.541214°W
- Owner: University of Richmond
- Operator: University of Richmond
- Capacity: 600
- Surface: Natural Grass (1975 – 2015); Artificial Turf (2015 – Present)
- Scoreboard: Electronic
- Field size: Left Field: 328 feet (100 m); Left Center Field: 350 feet (110 m); Center Field: 380 feet (120 m); Right Center Field: 350 feet (110 m); Right Field: 328 feet (100 m)

Construction
- Opened: March 1975
- Renovated: 2008, 2015

Tenant
- Richmond Spiders baseball (NCAA D1 A-10)

Malcolm U. Pitt Field is a baseball venue located on the campus of the University of Richmond in Richmond, Virginia, United States. The field is home to the Richmond Spiders baseball team of the NCAA Division I Atlantic 10 Conference. The field is named after former Spiders baseball and basketball coach Malcolm U. Pitt. It has a capacity of 600 people.

The field, located next to Westhampton Lake on the Richmond campus, is surfaced with synthetic turf, which was installed in 2015. Renovations prior to the 2008 season included the addition of a new scoreboard and sound system. Other features of the facility include an outfield drainage system, bullpen, batting cages, and a press box.

== See also ==
- List of NCAA Division I baseball venues
