= Smithson Field =

Baseball venue in Merion Station, Pennsylvania

- Interactive map of Smithson Field
- Full name: John W. Smithson Field
- Address: 431 N. Latches Ln, Merion Station, Pennsylvania 19066, USA
- Coordinates: 39.59441°N 75.14439°W
- Owner: Saint Joseph's University
- Operator: Saint Joseph's University
- Capacity: 400
- Surface: AstroTurf 3D GameDay Grass
- Scoreboard: Electronic
- Field size: Left Field - 327 feet Center Field - 400 feet Right Field - 330 feet

Construction
- Groundbreaking: 2011
- Built: 2011
- Opened: 2012

Tenant
- Saint Joseph's Hawks baseball (NCAA DI A-10) (2012–present)

John W. Smithson Field is a baseball stadium in Merion Station, Pennsylvania, United States. It is home to the Saint Joseph's Hawks baseball team of the NCAA Division I Atlantic 10 Conference. The field hosted its first game in spring 2012. The venue has a capacity of 400 spectators. It is named for John Smithson, Saint Joseph's alumni and once interim president of Saint Joseph's University.

== History ==
Construction began in June 2011, and the venue was scheduled to be completed for the start of the 2012 season. On March 9, 2012, the Hawks defeated the Iona Gaels 5–1, in the first ever game at Smithson Field.

== Features ==
The stadium features a press box, clubhouse, indoor hitting facility, suites and stadium lighting.

== See also ==
- List of NCAA Division I baseball venues
