= Atlantic 10 Conference baseball tournament =

- Conference baseball championship
- Sport: Baseball
- Conference: Atlantic 10 Conference
- Number of teams: 7
- Format: Double-elimination
- Current stadium: Capital One Park
- Current location: Tysons, VA
- Played: 1979–present
- Last contest: 2026
- Current champion: VCU
- Most championships: VCU (5)
- Official website: Atlantic10.com baseball

Host stadiums
- Capital One Park (2024, 2025, 2026); T. Henry Wilson Jr. Field (2022); The Diamond (2021, 2023); Billiken Sports Center (2014, 2017); Jim Houlihan Park at Jack Coffey Field (2006, 2012, 2016, 2019); Tucker Field at Barcroft Park (2015, 2018); Robert and Mariam Hayes Stadium (2013); Campbell's Field (2008, 2010–11); Fifth Third Field (2005, 2007, 2009); Dodd Memorial Stadium (2002–04); Cracker Jack Stadium (2001); Bear Stadium (1987–97, 1999–2000); Veterans Stadium (1998); Rutgers University (1982, 1986); Hawley Field (1985); Erny Field (1984); Beaver Field (1983); George Mason University (1981); The Ellipse (1980); Hershey High School, Lower Dauphin High School (1979)

Host locations
- Tysons, VA (2024, 2025, 2026); Davidson, NC (2022); Richmond, VA (2021, 2023); St. Louis, MO (2014, 2017); Bronx, NY (2006, 2012, 2016, 2019); Arlington, VA (2015, 2018); Charlotte, NC (2013); Camden, NJ (2008, 2010–11); Dayton, OH (2005, 2007, 2009); Norwich, CT (2002–04); Lake Buena Vista, FL (2001); Boyertown, PA (1987–97, 1999–2000); Philadelphia, PA (1984, 1998); Piscataway, NJ (1982, 1986); Morgantown, WV (1985); State College, PA (1983); Fairfax, VA (1981); Washington, D.C. (1980); Hershey, PA (1979)

The Atlantic 10 Conference baseball tournament, sometimes referred to simply as the A-10 tournament, is the conference baseball championship of the NCAA Division I Atlantic 10 Conference. The top seven finishers in the regular season of the conference's twelve teams advance to the double-elimination tournament, which in 2017 will be played at Billiken Sports Center in St. Louis, Missouri. The winner of the tournament receives an automatic berth to the NCAA Division I Baseball Championship.

== Champions ==
=== By year ===
The following is a list of conference champions and sites listed by year. From 1985 to 1995, a Most Valuable Pitcher Award was also awarded.

Year	Champion	Venue	Most Outstanding Player
1979	George Washington	Hershey High School, Lower Dauphin High School • Hershey, PA	Not named
1980	UMass	The Ellipse • Washington, DC	Not named
1981	Rutgers	George Mason University • Fairfax, VA	Not named
1982	West Virginia	Rutgers University • Piscataway, NJ	Jeff Wilson, West Virginia
1983	Temple	Beaver Field • State College, PA	Not named
1984	Temple	Erny Field • Philadelphia, PA	Not named
1985	West Virginia	Hawley Field • Morgantown, WV	Bob Bernardo, West Virginia; Harry Daut, Temple (Pitcher)
1986	Rutgers	Rutgers University • Piscataway, NJ	Sam Ferretti, Rutgers; Ken Smith, West Virginia (Pitcher)
1987	West Virginia	Bear Stadium • Boyertown, PA	Jon Snyzal, West Virginia; Dave Perry, West Virginia (Pitcher)
1988	Rutgers	Bear Stadium • Boyertown, PA	Drew Comeau, UMass; Darrin Winston, Rutgers (Pitcher)
1989	George Washington	Bear Stadium • Boyertown, PA	Mike Palys, Temple; Frank Terry, George Washington; Mike Rolfes, George Washington (Pitcher)
1990	Rutgers	Bear Stadium • Boyertown, PA	Paul Prosser, Rutgers; Steve Hoppel, Temple (Pitcher)
1991	Rutgers	Bear Stadium • Boyertown, PA	Jason Imperial, Rutgers; Dave Hoehler, Rutgers (Pitcher)
1992	George Washington	Bear Stadium • Boyertown, PA	Bill Reep, West Virginia; Matt Aminoff, George Washington (Pitcher)
1993	Rutgers	Bear Stadium • Boyertown, PA	Doug Alongi, Rutgers; Steve Hoppel, Temple (Pitcher)
1994	West Virginia	Bear Stadium • Boyertown, PA	Mark Landers, West Virginia; Ryan Williams, West Virginia (Pitcher)
1995	UMass	Bear Stadium • Boyertown, PA	Nelson Ubaldo, UMass; Andy Steinorth, St. Bonaventure (Pitcher)
1996	UMass	Bear Stadium • Boyertown, PA	Nate Murphy, UMass
1997	Virginia Tech	Bear Stadium • Boyertown, PA	Barry Gauch, Virginia Tech
1998	Fordham	Veterans Stadium • Philadelphia, PA	Tom Stein, Fordham
1999	Virginia Tech	Bear Stadium • Boyertown, PA	Larry Bowles, Virginia Tech
2000	Virginia Tech	Bear Stadium • Boyertown, PA	Addison Bowman, Virginia Tech
2001	Temple	Cracker Jack Stadium • Lake Buena Vista, FL	Kyle Sweppenheiser, Temple
2002	George Washington	Dodd Memorial Stadium • Norwich, CT	Mike Bassett, George Washington
2003	Richmond	Dodd Memorial Stadium • Norwich, CT	Vito Chairavalloti, Richmond
2004	St. Bonaventure	Dodd Memorial Stadium • Norwich, CT	Brian Pellegrini, St. Bonaventure
2005	Rhode Island	Fifth Third Field • Dayton, OH	Wayne Russo, Rhode Island
2006	Saint Louis	Jim Houlihan Park at Jack Coffey Field • Bronx, NY	Ryan Bird, Saint Louis
2007	Charlotte	Fifth Third Field • Dayton, OH	Shayne Moody, Charlotte
2008	Charlotte	Campbell's Field • Camden, NJ	Rob Lyerly, Charlotte
2009	Xavier	Fifth Third Field • Dayton, OH	Billy O'Connor, Xavier
2010	Saint Louis	Campbell's Field • Camden, NJ	Bryant Cotton, Saint Louis
2011	Charlotte	Campbell's Field • Camden, NJ	Corey Shaylor, Charlotte
2012	Dayton	Jim Houlihan Park at Jack Coffey Field • Bronx, NY	Burny Mitchem, Dayton
2013	Saint Louis	Robert and Mariam Hayes Stadium • Charlotte, NC	Alex Kelly, Saint Louis
2014	George Mason	Billiken Sports Center • St. Louis, MO	Luke Willis, George Mason
2015	VCU	Barcroft Park • Arlington, VA	Darian Carpenter, VCU
2016	Rhode Island	Jim Houlihan Park at Jack Coffey Field • Bronx, NY	Martin Figueroa, Rhode Island
2017	Davidson	Billiken Sports Center • St. Louis, MO	Alec Acosta, Davidson; Durin O'Linger, Davidson
2018	Saint Louis	Tucker Field at Barcroft Park • Arlington, VA	Drew Reveno, Saint Louis
2019	Fordham	Jim Houlihan Park at Jack Coffey Field • Bronx, NY	Nick Labella, Fordham
2020	Cancelled due to the coronavirus pandemic		
2021	VCU	The Diamond • Richmond, VA	Hunter Vay, VCU
2022	VCU	T. Henry Wilson Jr. Field • Davidson, NC	Tyler Locklear, VCU
2023	George Mason	The Diamond • Richmond, VA	Chad Gartland, George Mason
2024	VCU	Capital One Park • Tysons, VA	Brandon Eike, VCU
2025	Rhode Island	Capital One Park • Tysons, VA	DJ Perron, Rhode Island
2026	VCU	Capital One Park • Tysons, VA	Jacob Lee, VCU

== Conference championships by school ==
The following is a list of Atlantic 10 Conference baseball champions, organized by school.

Program	Championships	Years
VCU	5	2015, 2021, 2022, 2024, 2026
George Washington	4	1979, 1989, 1992, 2002
Saint Louis	4	2006, 2010, 2013, 2018
West Virginia	4	1982, 1985, 1987, 1994
Charlotte	3	2007, 2008, 2011
UMass	3	1980, 1995, 1996
Rhode Island	3	2005, 2016, 2025
Temple	3	1983, 1984, 2001
Virginia Tech	3	1997, 1999, 2000
Fordham	2	1998, 2019
George Mason	2	2014, 2023
Davidson	1	2017
Dayton	1	2012
Richmond	1	2003
St. Bonaventure	1	2004
Xavier	1	2009

Italicized programs are no longer members of the Atlantic 10 Conference. Of current members of the Atlantic 10, La Salle and Saint Joseph's are the only member to have not won the Atlantic 10 Conference tournament.
