= Mike Stone (baseball) =

American college baseball coach (born 1955)

Current position
- Title: Head coach

Biographical details
- Born: April 29, 1955 (age 71)

Playing career

Baseball
- 1974: Gulf Coast Cardinals
- 1974–1976: St. Petersburg Cardinals
- 1976: Arkansas Travelers
- 1977: St. Petersburg Cardinals
- 1978: Lodi Dodgers

Football
- 1978–1981: UMass

Coaching career (HC unless noted)
- 1983–1987: Vermont
- 1988–2017: UMass

Head coaching record
- Overall: 751–785–5

Accomplishments and honors

Championships
- A-10 tournament: 1995, 1996

Awards
- A-10 Coach of the Year: 1994, 1995, 1996

Mike Stone (born April 29, 1955) is an American college baseball coach. He recently served as the head baseball coach for the UMass Minutemen. He was named to that position prior to the 1988 season. Stone retired after the 2017 season.

== Playing career ==
Stone played high school baseball at Taft School, and was drafted in the third round of the 1974 MLB draft by the St. Louis Cardinals. He played four seasons in the Cardinals organization, primarily as a catcher, and reached Class-AA, and spent one season in the Los Angeles Dodgers organization.

After ending his baseball career, Stone played football for UMass while pursuing a degree in physical education.

== Coaching career ==
Stone began coaching at Northfield Mount Hermon School, serving as head baseball coach for the 1982 season. He then earned a position as head coach at Vermont, where he remained for five seasons, succeeding Jack Leggett. In his time at Vermont, the Catamounts struggled but finished above .500 in his final season. Stone also earned a master's degree while at Vermont.

During his tenure at UMass, the Minutemen have won eight Atlantic 10 Conference regular season crowns, a pair of Atlantic 10 Conference baseball tournament titles, and seen 36 players sign professional contracts. Stone was named Atlantic 10 Conference Coach of the Year three times in a row from 1994 through 1996.

== Head coaching record ==
This table shows Stone's record as a college head coach.

Record table
Season	Team	Overall	Conference	Standing	Postseason
Vermont (ECAC North) (1983–1987)
1983	Vermont	8–13–2	5-8-1	8th	
1984	Vermont	14–15	7-7	4th	
1985	Vermont	8–29	2-10	5th	
1986	Vermont	9–19	6-9	5th	
1987	Vermont	15–14	6-8	4th	
Vermont:		54–90–2	26-42-1		
UMass (Atlantic 10 Conference) (1988–2017)
1988	UMass	36–16	9–7	2nd (East)	A-10 Tournament
1989	UMass	17–27	5–11	4th (East)	
1990	UMass	26–20	12–4	2nd (East)	A-10 tournament
1991	UMass	26–25–1	10–6	2nd (East)	A-10 tournament
1992	UMass	25–16	11–5	2nd (East)	A-10 tournament
1993	UMass	18–21	9–11	6th	
1994	UMass	31–17	19–4	1st	A-10 tournament
1995	UMass	38–14	19–5	1st	NCAA Regional
1996	UMass	40–13	15–5	1st (East)	NCAA Regional
1997	UMass	35–12	17–4	1st (East)	A-10 tournament
1998	UMass	27–12	15–3	1st (East)	A-10 tournament
1999	UMass	26–23	13–8	1st (East)	A-10 tournament
2000	UMass	26–22–1	11–9–1	2nd (East)	A-10 tournament
2001	UMass	27–19	15–5	1st	A-10 tournament
2002	UMass	21–26	9–15	5th	
2003	UMass	26–19	14–7	T-1st (East)	A-10 tournament
2004	UMass	19–26	10–14	T-4th (East)	
2005	UMass	16–33	9–15	3rd (East)	
2006	UMass	14–30	11–16	11th	
2007	UMass	22–25	13–14	8th	
2008	UMass	18–27	11–16	T-9th	
2009	UMass	27–26	16–11	T-4th	A-10 tournament
2010	UMass	19–27	13–14	T-8th	
2011	UMass	17–29–1	8–15–1	12th	
2012	UMass	22–22	14–10	T-4th (13)	A-10 tournament (Note: The top six finishers of the A-10's thirteen teams qualified for the tournament in 2012)
2013	UMass	14–31	7–17	14th (15)	
2014	UMass	15–31	12–15	T-8th (12)	
2015	UMass	16–27	12–12	T-8th	
2016	UMass	18–27	11–13	T-8th	
2017	UMass	15–32	8–16	11th	
UMass:		697–695–3	358-307-2		
Total:		751–785–5			
National champion Postseason invitational champion Conference regular season champion Conference regular season and conference tournament champion Division regular season champion Division regular season and conference tournament champion Conference tournament champion

== See also ==
- Career statistics from Baseball Reference (Minors)
