= 2010 Atlantic 10 Conference baseball tournament =

American college baseball tournament

- Teams: 6
- Format: Six-team double elimination First-round byes for top two seeds
- Finals site: Campbell's Field; Camden, NJ
- Champions: Saint Louis (2nd title)
- Winning coach: Darin Hendrickson (1st title)
- MVP: Bryant Cotton (Saint Louis)

The 2010 Atlantic 10 Conference Baseball Championship was held from May 26 through 29 at Campbell's Field in Camden, New Jersey. It featured the top six regular-season finishers of the conference's 14 teams. Fifth-seeded Saint Louis defeated Charlotte in the title game to win the tournament for the second time, earning the A-10's automatic bid to the 2010 NCAA tournament.

== Seeding ==
The league's top six teams, based on winning percentage in the 27-game regular-season schedule, were seeded one through six. The top two seeds, Charlotte and Xavier, received byes into the second round of play in the double elimination tournament.

Team	W	L	Pct.	GB	Seed
Charlotte	20	7	.741	–	1
Xavier	18	9	.667	2	2
Rhode Island	17	10	.630	3	3
Fordham (Note: Fordham was given the fourth seed over Saint Louis because of its regular season series win against the Billikens.)	15	12	.556	5	4
Saint Louis	15	12	.556	5	5
La Salle (Note: La Salle was given the sixth seed over George Washington because of its better record against common conference opponents Dayton, Duquesne, Fordham, Massachusetts, St. Bonaventure, and Temple. La Salle went 11–7 against these six teams, while George Washington went 10-8.)	14	13	.519	6	6
George Washington	14	13	.519	6	–
Massachusetts	13	14	.481	7	–
Saint Joseph's	13	14	.481	7	–
Dayton	12	15	.444	8	–
Richmond	10	17	.370	10	–
Duquesne	10	17	.370	10	–
Temple	10	17	.370	10	–
St. Bonaventure	8	19	.296	12	–

== Bracket ==
Upper round 1
5	Saint Louis	16
4	Fordham	11
6	La Salle	2
3	Rhode Island	7
Lower round 1
4	Fordham	8
6	La Salle	10
3	Rhode Island	7
6	La Salle	2

Upper round 2
1	Charlotte	2
5	Saint Louis	3
2	Xavier	4
3	Rhode Island	2
Lower round 2
1	Charlotte	7
3	Rhode Island	3

Upper final
5	Saint Louis	12
2	Xavier	9
Lower final
2	Xavier	7
1	Charlotte	18

Final
5	Saint Louis	5
1	Charlotte	4

== All-Tournament Team ==
The following players were named to the All-Tournament Team. Saint Louis's Bryant Cotton, one of four Billikens selected, was named Most Outstanding Player.

Rhode Island's Tom Coulombe and Xavier's Bobby Freking, both chosen in 2009, were second-time selections.

Name	Team
Shane Brown	Charlotte
Ryan Rivers	Charlotte
Tim Boyce	Rhode Island
Tom Coulombe	Rhode Island
Mike LeBel	Rhode Island
Jason Bell	Saint Louis
Ben Braaten	Saint Louis
Bryant Cotton	Saint Louis
Mike Levine	Saint Louis
Bobby Freking	Xavier
Tommy Shirley	Xavier
