= 2012 Atlantic 10 Conference baseball tournament =

American college baseball tournament

- Teams: 6
- Format: Double-elimination
- Finals site: Houlihan Park; Bronx, NY
- Champions: Dayton (1st title)
- Winning coach: Tony Vittorio (1st title)
- MVP: Burny Mitchem (Dayton)

2012 Atlantic 10 Conference baseball standings
	Conf.						Overall
Team	W		L		T	PCT	W		L		T	PCT
Saint Louis ‍†‍‍	17	–	7	–	0	.708	41	–	18	–	0	.695
Dayton ‍†‍‡‍^{y}	17	–	7	–	0	.708	31	–	30	–	0	.508
Rhode Island ‍‍‍	16	–	8	–	0	.667	33	–	25	–	1	.568
Richmond ‍‍‍	14	–	10	–	0	.583	30	–	26	–	0	.536
UMass ‍‍‍	14	–	10	–	0	.583	22	–	22	–	0	.500
Saint Joseph's ‍‍‍	13	–	10	–	0	.565	25	–	32	–	0	.439
Xavier ‍‍‍	13	–	11	–	0	.542	28	–	28	–	0	.500
Fordham ‍‍‍	12	–	12	–	0	.500	22	–	34	–	0	.393
St. Bonaventure ‍‍‍	10	–	14	–	0	.417	23	–	25	–	0	.479
Charlotte ‍‍‍	9	–	14	–	0	.391	21	–	32	–	0	.396
La Salle ‍‍‍	7	–	17	–	0	.292	20	–	33	–	0	.377
Temple ‍‍‍	7	–	17	–	0	.292	19	–	34	–	0	.358
George Washington ‍‍‍	6	–	18	–	0	.250	20	–	35	–	0	.364
† – Conference champion ‡ – Tournament champion y – Invited to the NCAA tournament As of June 30, 2012; Rankings from Coaches' Poll

The 2012 Atlantic 10 Conference baseball tournament was held from May 23 through 26. The top six regular season finishers of the league's thirteen teams met in the double-elimination tournament at Jim Houlihan Park at Jack Coffey Field on the campus of Fordham University in the Bronx, New York. Second seed Dayton won their first tournament championship and claimed the conference's automatic bid to the 2012 NCAA Division I baseball tournament.

== Seeding and format ==
The top six finishers from the regular season were seeded one through six based on conference winning percentage. The bottom four seeds played on the first day, with the losers of each game playing an elimination game in game 3. On day 2, the winners of games 1 and 2 played the top two seeds. Higher seeds were protected by playing lower seeds or playing later elimination games. Saint Louis claimed the top seed over Dayton and UMass claimed the fourth seed over Richmond by tiebreaker.

Team	W	L	Pct.	GB	Seed
Saint Louis	17	7	.708	–	1
Dayton	17	7	.708	–	2
Rhode Island	16	8	.667	1	3
UMass	14	10	.583	3	4
Richmond	14	10	.583	3	5
Saint Joseph's	13	10	.565	3.5	6
Xavier	13	11	.542	4	–
Fordham	12	12	.500	5	–
St. Bonaventure	10	14	.417	7	–
Charlotte	9	14	.391	7.5	–
La Salle	7	17	.292	10	–
Temple	7	17	.292	10	–
George Washington	6	18	.250	11	–

== Results ==
Upper round 1
5	Richmond	9
4	UMass	4
6	Saint Joseph's	3
3	Rhode Island	0
Lower round 1
3	Rhode Island	6
4	UMass	5
3	Rhode Island	2
6	Saint Joseph's	3

Upper round 2
5	Richmond	6
1	Saint Louis	0
6	Saint Joseph's	3
2	Dayton	4
Lower round 2
6	Saint Joseph's	0
1	Saint Louis	6

Upper final
2	Dayton	9
5	Richmond	5
Lower final
5	Richmond	3
1	Saint Louis	2

Final
2	Dayton	3
5	Richmond	0

== All-Tournament Team ==
The following players were named to the All-Tournament Team.

Richmond's Jacob Mayers, also selected in 2011, was a second-time selection.

POS	Name	School	Class
P	Burny Mitchem	Dayton	SR
P	Alex Pracher	Saint Joseph's	GR
P	Clay Smith	Saint Louis	SO
P	Zach Sterling	Richmond	FR
C	Josh Jeffery	Dayton	SR
1B	Dylan Begin	UMass	SO
3B	Robby Sunderman	Dayton	SO
OF	Chris Famiglietti	Rhode Island	JR
OF	Ian Hundley	Dayton	JR
OF	Phil Ruzbarsky	Richmond	SR
OF	Brett Tiagwad	Saint Joseph's	SR
DH	Jacob Mayers	Richmond	JR

=== Most Valuable Player ===
Burny Mitchem was named Tournament Most Valuable Player. Mitchem was a senior pitcher for Dayton, who earned a pair of saves including in the 3–0 final over Richmond.
