= 2003 Atlantic 10 Conference baseball tournament =

American college baseball tournament

- Teams: 6
- Format: Six-team double elimination First-round byes for division winners
- Champions: Richmond (1st title)
- Winning coach: Ron Atkins (1st title)
- MVP: Vito Chairavalloti (Richmond)

The 2003 Atlantic 10 Conference Baseball Championship was held at Dodd Stadium in Norwich, CT from May 15 through 17 (preliminaries) and at Pitt Field in Richmond, VA on May 22 and 24 (championship series). It featured the top two regular-season finishers of each six-team division, plus the next two best finishers. Top-seeded Richmond defeated Massachusetts in the title game to win the tournament for the first time, earning the Atlantic 10's automatic bid to the 2003 NCAA tournament.

== Seeding and format ==
The league's top six teams, based on winning percentage in the 24-game regular season schedule, qualified for the field. The top two teams in each division qualified for the tournament automatically; the two division winners, Massachusetts in the East and Richmond in the West, received the top two seeds and byes through to the second round of the double elimination tournament. The tournament was different from most double-elimination formats in that after the two finalists were decided, losses were erased, and a best-of-three series was played at a new site the following weekend to decide the champion.

Team	W	L	Pct.	GB	Seed
East Division
Massachusetts (Note: Massachusetts's regular-season series win over Rhode Island gave it the higher seed within the East Division.)	14	7	.667	–	2
Rhode Island	16	8	.667	–	3
St. Bonaventure	9	11	.450	4.5	–
Saint Joseph's	10	14	.417	5.5	–
Temple	10	14	.417	5.5	–
Fordham	8	15	.348	7	–
West Division
Richmond	19	4	.826	–	1
Duquesne	15	9	.625	4.5	4
Xavier	13	8	.619	5	5
George Washington	12	9	.571	6	6
La Salle	6	17	.261	13	–
Dayton	4	20	.167	15.5	–

== Bracket ==
First round
5	Xavier	6
4	Duquesne	3
6	George Washington	7
3	Rhode Island	2
4	Duquesne	2
3	Rhode Island	3
6	George Washington	8
3	Rhode Island	4

Quarter-finals
1	Richmond	1
5	Xavier	2
2	Massachusetts	3
6	George Washington	1
1	Richmond	8
6	George Washington	2

Semi-finals
5	Xavier	5
2	Massachusetts	8
5	Xavier	3
1	Richmond	6

Final
2	Massachusetts	0	4	–
1	Richmond	8	7	–

== All-Tournament Team ==
The following players were named to the All-Tournament Team. Richmond's Vito Chairavalloti, one of six Spiders selected, was named Most Outstanding Player.

Richmond's David Reaver and Tim Stauffer, who had both been selected in 2002, were named for the second time.

Pos.	Name	Team
OF	Vito Chairavalloti	Richmond
P	Eric Chown	Massachusetts
OF	Frank Curreri	Massachusetts
2B	Bobby LeNoir	Richmond
P	Mike McGirr	Richmond
P	Matt McLoughlin	Richmond
SS	David Reaver	Richmond
3B	Matt Reynolds	Massachusetts
1B	Ryan Roberson	George Washington
P	Tim Stauffer	Richmond
P	Jarret Sues	Xavier
P	Dan Sullivan	George Washington
