= 1999 Atlantic 10 Conference baseball tournament =

American college baseball tournament

- Teams: 4
- Format: Four-team double elimination
- Finals site: Bear Stadium (Boyertown); Boyertown, PA
- Champions: Virginia Tech (2nd title)
- Winning coach: Chuck Hartman (2nd title)
- MVP: Larry Bowles (Virginia Tech)

The 1999 Atlantic 10 Conference Baseball Championship was held at Bear Stadium in Boyertown, Pennsylvania from May 20 through 22. It was the 12th time was held in Boyertown, where it was previously held from 1987 to 1997. It featured the top two regular-season finishers of each of the conference's six-team divisions. West Division top seed Virginia Tech defeated La Salle in the title game to win the tournament for the second time, earning the Atlantic 10's automatic bid to the 1999 NCAA tournament.

== Seeding and format ==
Each division's top teams, based on winning percentage in the 21-game regular season schedule, qualified for the field. In the four-team double-elimination format, the East Division champion played the West Division runner-up, and vice versa. In the West Division, conference tiebreaking rules gave La Salle the second seed in the four-way tie for second place.

Team	W	L	Pct.	GB	Seed
East Division
Massachusetts	13	8	.619	–	1E
Temple	12	9	.571	1	2E
Fordham	10	11	.476	3	–
Rhode Island	10	11	.476	3	–
St. Bonaventure	10	11	.476	3	–
Saint Joseph's	5	16	.238	8	–
West Division
Virginia Tech	18	3	.857	–	1W
La Salle	10	11	.476	8	2W
Duquesne	10	11	.476	8	–
George Washington	10	11	.476	8	–
Xavier	10	11	.476	8	–
Dayton	8	13	.381	10	–

== Bracket ==
Upper round 1
1W	Virginia Tech	4
2E	Temple	3
1E	Massachusetts	6
2W	La Salle	7
Lower round 1
2E	Temple	1
1E	Massachusetts	4

Upper final
1W	Virginia Tech	6
2W	La Salle	13
Lower final
1W	Virginia Tech	9
1E	Massachusetts	4

Final
2W	La Salle
1W	Virginia Tech

== All-Tournament Team ==
The following players were named to the All-Tournament Team. Virginia Tech's Larry Bowles, one of six Hokies selected, was named Most Outstanding Player.

Virginia Tech's Barry Gauch was named for the third time. He was the Most Outstanding Player in 1997 and also named in 1998. The Hokies' Matt Griswold was named for the second time, after also being selected in 1997.

Pos.	Name	Team
OF	Mike Bell	La Salle
3B/P	Larry Bowles	Virginia Tech
SS	Addison Bowman	Virginia Tech
3B/P	Toby Fisher	La Salle
OF	Matt Griswold	Virginia Tech
C/DH	Barry Gauch	Virginia Tech
P	Pat Pinkman	Virginia Tech
OF	Kyle Sweppenhiser	Temple
P	Travis Veracka	Massachusetts
3B	John West	Virginia Tech
C	Kevin Wittmeyer	La Salle
