= Tony Vittorio =

American baseball player and coach

Current position
- Title: Head coach
- Team: Wilmington
- Conference: Ohio Athletic
- Record: 8–29

Biographical details
- Born: Indianapolis, Indiana, U.S.
- Education: Hanover College; University of Kentucky

Playing career
- 1985–1988: Hanover
- Position: Infielder

Coaching career (HC unless noted)
- 1990: Indiana (asst.)
- 1991–1994: Lincoln Trail CC
- 1995–1996: Kentucky (asst.)
- 1997–1999: IPFW
- 2000–2017: Dayton
- 2019–present: Wilmington

Head coaching record
- Overall: 695–761
- Tournaments: A-10: 9–14; NCAA: 0–2

Accomplishments and honors

Championships
- A-10: 2009; A-10 Tournament: 2012

Tony Vittorio is a college baseball player and coach. He is currently the head coach of the Wilmington Quakers baseball team. He was the head baseball coach of the Dayton Flyers baseball program. Vittorio has been the head coach at Dayton since the 2000 season, accumulating over 350 wins and overseeing the construction of the Flyers' Woerner Field.

== Early years ==
Vittorio grew up in Indianapolis, Indiana and graduated from Southport High School in 1984. He then attended and graduated from Hanover College in 1988 with a double major in business administration and physical education. Vittorio played four years of college baseball at Hanover. Vittorio then attended the University of Kentucky, where he graduated in 1997 with a master's degree in sports management.

== Career ==
After spending one season as a volunteer assistant at Indiana University, Vittorio landed his first head coaching job at age 24 for the Lincoln Trail Community College Statesmen. In the season prior to his arrival, Lincoln Trail had a 2–48 record, but Vittorio rebuilt the program over four seasons, winning 144 games and sending over twenty players to four-year college programs.

Vittorio then moved to the University of Kentucky, where he spent two years as an assistant coach while working on his master's degree. Vittorio was hired in 1996 by then-Division II school Indiana University – Purdue University Fort Wayne (IPFW), where he spent three seasons coaching the Mastodons, winning a total of 80 games during his tenure.

In the fall of 1999, Vittorio was hired by the University of Dayton, where he has coached since. Prior to Vittorio's arrival, Dayton had had one winning season (1998). In 2001, Vittorio guided the Flyers to a 32–26 record and a second-place finish in the Atlantic 10 West Division, marking Dayton's second winning season and first appearance in the Atlantic 10 Conference baseball tournament. In 2009, Vittorio was named Atlantic 10 Coach of the Year after leading the Flyers to a 38–19 record, a program-best 21–6 conference record, and the program's first conference regular season championship. In 2012, Vittorio led the Flyers to their first appearance in the NCAA Division I baseball tournament.

== Head coaching records ==
The following is a table of Vittorio's yearly records as an NCAA head baseball coach.

Record table
Season	Team	Overall	Conference	Standing	Postseason
Lincoln Trail CC Statesmen (Community College) (1991–1994)
1991	Lincoln Trail CC	20–41			
1992	Lincoln Trail CC	39–32			
1993	Lincoln Trail CC	40–30			
1994	Lincoln Trail CC	45–28			
Lincoln Trail CC:		144–131			
IPFW Mastodons (Great Lakes Valley Conference) (1997–1999)
1997	IPFW	24–23	8–16	5th (North)	
1998	IPFW	30–17	9–9	3rd (North)	
1999	IPFW	26–27	7–17	5th (North)	
IPFW:		80–67	24–42		
Dayton Flyers (Atlantic 10 Conference) (2000–2017)
2000	Dayton	23–32	10–11	4th	
2001	Dayton	32–26	15–7	2nd	Atlantic 10 tournament
2002	Dayton	32–21	14–10	4th (West)	Atlantic 10 tournament
2003	Dayton	16–36	4–20	6th (West)	
2004	Dayton	25–28	11–13	4th (West)	
2005	Dayton	36–23	16–8	2nd (West)	Atlantic 10 tournament
2006	Dayton	33–24	18–9	3rd	Atlantic 10 tournament
2007	Dayton	21–33	9–18	11th	
2008	Dayton	31–25	13–14	7th	
2009	Dayton	38–19	21–6	1st	Atlantic 10 tournament
2010	Dayton	23–32	12–15	10th	
2011	Dayton	32–27	15–9	3rd	Atlantic 10 tournament
2012	Dayton	31–30	17–7	2nd	NCAA Regional
2013	Dayton	11–39	3–21	15th	
2014	Dayton	24–30	14–13	6th	Atlantic 10 tournament
2015	Dayton	16–38	5–19	12th	
2016	Dayton	19–36	8–16	11th	
2017	Dayton	20–35	9–15	10th	
Dayton:		463–534	214–231		
Wilmington Quakers (Ohio Athletic Conference) (2019–present)
2019	Wilmington	8–29	4–14	10th	
2020	Wilmington	0–0	0–0		
Wilmington:		8–29	4–14		
Total:		695–761			
National champion Postseason invitational champion Conference regular season champion Conference regular season and conference tournament champion Division regular season champion Division regular season and conference tournament champion Conference tournament champion
