= 1998 Atlantic 10 Conference baseball tournament =

American college baseball tournament

- Teams: 4
- Format: Four-team single elimination
- Finals site: Veterans Stadium; Philadelphia, PA
- Champions: Fordham (1st title)
- Winning coach: Dan Gallagher (1st title)
- MVP: Tom Stein (Fordham)

The 1998 Atlantic 10 Conference Baseball Championship was held at Veterans Stadium in Philadelphia, Pennsylvania on May 12. It was scheduled to be a double-elimination tournament held at Bear Stadium in Boyertown, Pennsylvania, where it had been held from 1987 to 1997. Rain, however, forced the league to move it to the Phillies' Veterans Stadium and change it to a one-day, single-elimination tournament. It featured the top two regular-season finishers of each of the conference's six-team divisions. East Division second seed Fordham defeated Virginia Tech in the title game to win the tournament for the first time, earning the Atlantic 10's automatic bid to the 1998 NCAA tournament.

== Seeding and format ==
Each division's top teams, based on winning percentage in the 18-game regular season schedule, qualified for the field. In the four-team single-elimination format forced by rain, the East Division champion opened by playing the West Division runner-up, and vice versa.

Team	W	L	Pct.	GB	Seed
East Division
Massachusetts	15	3	.833	–	1E
Fordham	10	8	.556	5	2E
Rhode Island	8	10	.444	7	–
St. Bonaventure	8	10	.444	7	–
Temple	7	11	.389	8	–
Saint Joseph's	6	12	.333	9	–
West Division
George Washington	13	2	.867	–	1W
Virginia Tech	10	5	.667	3	2W
Duquesne	11	7	.611	3.5	–
Xavier	9	8	.529	5	–
Dayton	5	12	.294	9	–
La Salle	1	15	.063	12.5	–

== Bracket ==
Semifinals
1E	Massachusetts	6
2W	Virginia Tech	7
1W	George Washington	5
2E	Fordham	14

Finals
2W	Virginia Tech	1
2E	Fordham	3

== All-Tournament Team ==
The following players were named to the All-Tournament Team. Fordham third baseman Tom Stein, one of four Rams selected, was named Most Outstanding Player.

The three Virginia Tech players selected, catcher Barry Gauch, pitcher Jon Hand, and second baseman Randy Martin, were all second-time selections. Hand was selected in 1996. Gauch and Martin were both selected in 1997, when Gauch was also named Most Outstanding Player.

Pos.	Name	Team
OF	Aaron Braunstein	Massachusetts
SS	Ryan Dacey	George Washington
2B	Muchie Dagliere	Massachusetts
C	Barry Gauch	Virginia Tech
P	Jon Hand	Virginia Tech
2B	Randy Martin	Virginia Tech
P	Gary Reznick	Fordham
OF	Dan Rouhier	George Washington
OF	Bob Sprague	Fordham
3B	Tom Stein	Fordham
OF	Anthony Vega	Fordham

== Notes ==
- With the tournament being moved to Veterans Stadium this was the first conference baseball tournament to be held in an MLB stadium.
