= 2002 Atlantic 10 Conference baseball tournament =

American college baseball tournament

- Teams: 6
- Format: Six-team double elimination First-round byes for division winners
- Champions: George Washington (4th title)
- Winning coach: Tom Walter (1st title)
- MVP: Mike Bassett (George Washington)

The 2002 Atlantic 10 Conference Baseball Championship was held at Dodd Stadium in Norwich, CT from May 16 through 20 (preliminaries) and Pitt Field in Richmond, Virginia, from May 22 through 24 (championship series). It featured the top six regular-season finishers of the conference's 12 teams, regardless of division. 2002 was the first season that the tournament was expanded to six teams. Top-seeded Richmond defeated Massachusetts in the title game to win the tournament for the first time, earning the Atlantic 10's automatic bid to the 2002 NCAA tournament.

== Seeding and format ==
The league's top six teams, based on winning percentage in the 24-game regular season schedule, qualified for the field. The top two teams in each division qualified for the tournament automatically; the two division winners, Massachusetts in the East and Richmond in the West, received the top two seeds and byes through to the second round of the double elimination tournament. The tournament was different from most double-elimination formats in that after the two finalists were decided, losses were erased, and a best-of-three series was played at a new site the following to decide the champion.

Team	W	L	Pct.	GB	Seed
East Division
St. Bonaventure	16	7	.696	–	2
Temple	11	13	.458	5.5	5
Rhode Island	10	14	.417	6.5	–
Saint Joseph's	10	14	.417	6.5	–
Massachusetts	9	15	.375	7.5	–
Fordham	6	18	.250	10.5	–
West Division
Richmond	22	2	.917	–	1
George Washington	17	7	.708	5	3
Xavier	15	8	.652	6.5	4
Dayton	14	10	.583	8	6
Duquesne	12	12	.500	10	–
La Salle	1	23	.042	21	–

== Bracket ==
First round
5	Temple	6
4	Xavier	2
6	Dayton	2
3	George Washington	8
4	Xavier	8
6	Dayton	0
5	Temple	2
4	Xavier	1

Quarter-finals
1	Richmond	5
5	Temple	3
2	St. Bonaventure	6^{12}
3	George Washington	7
2	St. Bonaventure	5
5	Temple	2

Semi-finals
1	Richmond	6
3	George Washington	4
3	George Washington	5
2	St. Bonaventure	4

Final
1	Richmond	4	12	4
3	George Washington	6^{10}	5	6

== All-Tournament Team ==
The following players were named to the All-Tournament Team. George Washington outfielder Mike Bassett, one of five Colonials selected, was named Most Outstanding Player.

Three George Washington players had been named to the team before. Mike Bassett, who had been named in 2000 and 2001, was a third-time selection. Jeff Fertitta and Jake Wald, both named in 2001, were second-time selections.

Pos.	Name	Team
OF	Mike Bassett	George Washington
1B	Jeff Fertitta	George Washington
P	Adam Jahnsen	Xavier
P	Thomas Martin	Richmond
C	Joe Michalski	George Washington
P	Justin Orenduff	George Washington
3B	David Reaver	Richmond
1B	Kevin Ryan	St. Bonaventure
P	Tim Stauffer	Richmond
C	Adam Tidball	Richmond
SS	Jake Wald	George Washington
3B	Mike Weckenman	Temple
