= 1989 Atlantic 10 Conference baseball tournament =

American college baseball tournament

- Teams: 4
- Format: Four-team double elimination
- Finals site: Bear Stadium (Boyertown); Boyertown, PA
- Champions: George Washington (2nd title)
- Winning coach: John Castleberry (1st title)
- MVP: Mike Palys/Frank Terry (Temple/George Washington)

The 1989 Atlantic 10 Conference Baseball Championship was held at Bear Stadium in Boyertown, Pennsylvania from May 12 through 14. The double elimination tournament featured the top two regular-season finishers from both of the league's divisions. West top seed George Washington defeated Temple in the title game to win the tournament for the second time, earning the Atlantic 10's automatic bid to the 1989 NCAA tournament.

== Seeding and format ==
Each division's top teams, based on winning percentage in the 16-game regular season schedule, qualified for the field. In the opening round of the four-team double-elimination format, the East Division champion played the West Division runner-up, and vice versa.

Team	W	L	Pct.	GB	Seed
East Division
Rutgers	14	2	.875	–	1E
Temple	11	5	.688	3	2E
Rhode Island	5	10	.333	8.5	–
Massachusetts	5	11	.313	9	–
Saint Joseph's	4	11	.267	9.5	–
West Division
George Washington	13	3	.813	–	1W
Penn State	12	4	.750	1	2W
West Virginia	9	5	.643	3	–
St. Bonaventure	4	10	.286	8	–
Duquesne	0	16	.000	13	–

== Bracket ==
First round
1W	George Washington	1
2E	Temple	10
1E	Rutgers	6
2W	Penn State	1
Lower round 1
1W	George Washington	3
2W	Penn State	2

Semi-finals
2E	Temple	9
1E	Rutgers	7
Lower final
1E	Rutgers	3
1W	George Washington	6

Finals
2E	Temple	2	8
1W	George Washington	3	9

== All-Tournament ==
Temple's Mike Palys and George Washington's Frank Terry shared Most Valuable Player honors. George Washington's Mike Rolfes was named Most Valuable Pitcher.
