= 2000 Atlantic 10 Conference baseball tournament =

American college baseball tournament

- Teams: 4
- Format: Four-team double elimination
- Finals site: Bear Stadium (Boyertown); Boyertown, PA
- Champions: Virginia Tech (3rd title)
- Winning coach: Chuck Hartman (3rd title)
- MVP: Addison Bowman (Virginia Tech)

The 2000 Atlantic 10 Conference Baseball Championship was held at Bear Stadium in Boyertown, Pennsylvania from May 18 through 20. It was the 13th and final tournament held in Boyertown. It featured the top two regular-season finishers of each of the conference's six-team divisions. West Division top seed Virginia Tech defeated Massachusetts in the title game to win the tournament for the third time, earning the Atlantic 10's automatic bid to the 2000 NCAA tournament.

== Seeding and format ==
Each division's top teams, based on winning percentage in the 21-game regular season schedule, qualified for the field. In the four-team double-elimination format, the East Division champion played the West Division runner-up, and vice versa. In the West Division, Virginia Tech's regular season series win over George Washington gave it the top seed.

Team	W	L	T	Pct.	GB	Seed
East Division
St. Bonaventure	13	8	0	.619	–	1E
Massachusetts	11	9	1	.548	1.5	2E
Temple	9	11	1	.452	3.5	–
Saint Joseph's	8	13	0	.381	5	–
Rhode Island	8	13	0	.381	5	–
Fordham	7	14	0	.333	6	–
West Division
Virginia Tech	16	5	0	.762	–	1W
George Washington	16	5	0	.762	–	2W
Xavier	13	8	0	.619	3	–
Duquesne	10	11	0	.476	6	–
Dayton	10	11	0	.476	6	–
La Salle	4	17	0	.190	12	–

== Bracket ==
Upper round 1
1E	St. Bonaventure	3
2W	George Washington	4 (Note: 10 innings.)
1W	Virginia Tech	4
2E	Massachusetts	3
Lower round 1
1E	St. Bonaventure	5
2E	Massachusetts	6

Upper final
2W	George Washington	1
1W	Virginia Tech	9
Lower final
2W	George Washington	8
2E	Massachusetts	9

Final
1W	Virginia Tech
2E	Massachusetts

== All-Tournament Team ==
The following players were named to the All-Tournament Team. Virginia Tech shortstop Addison Bowman, one of three Hokies selected, was named Most Outstanding Player.

Virginia Tech's Addison Bowman, also named in 1999, was selected for the second time.

Pos.	Name	Team
OF	Mike Bassett	George Washington
P	Adam Belicic	George Washington
SS	Addison Bowman	Virginia Tech
P	Jason Bush	Virginia Tech
C	Jed English	Virginia Tech
SS	Mark Evers	St. Bonaventure
3B	Chad Foutz	Virginia Tech
3B	Kyle Johnson	St. Bonaventure
P	Jesse Santos	Massachusetts
IF	Aaron Senez	Massachusetts
2B	Shaun Skeffington	Massachusetts
