= 1997 Atlantic 10 Conference baseball tournament =

American college baseball tournament

- Teams: 4
- Format: Four-team double elimination
- Finals site: Bear Stadium (Boyertown); Boyertown, PA
- Champions: Virginia Tech (1st title)
- Winning coach: Chuck Hartman (1st title)
- MVP: Barry Gauch (Virginia Tech)

The 1997 Atlantic 10 Conference Baseball Championship was held at Bear Stadium in Boyertown, Pennsylvania from May 15 through 17. The double elimination tournament featured the top two regular-season finishers of each of the conference's six-team divisions. West Division second seed Virginia Tech defeated Massachusetts in the title game to win the tournament for the first time, earning the Atlantic 10's automatic bid to the 1997 NCAA tournament.

== Seeding and format ==
Each division's top teams, based on winning percentage in the 21-game regular season schedule, qualified for the field. In the opening round of the four-team double-elimination format, the East Division champion played the West Division runner-up, and vice versa.

Team	W	L	Pct.	GB	Seed
East Division
Massachusetts	17	4	.810	–	1E
Fordham	12	9	.571	5	2E
St. Bonaventure	9	12	.429	8	–
Temple	9	12	.429	8	–
Rhode Island	6	15	.286	11	–
Saint Joseph's	4	17	.190	13	–
West Division
Xavier	14	6	.700	–	1W
Virginia Tech	13	8	.619	1.5	2W
Dayton	12	9	.571	2.5	–
Duquesne	12	9	.571	2.5	–
George Washington	9	12	.429	5.5	–
La Salle	8	12	.400	6	–

== Bracket ==
Upper round 1
1W	Xavier	6
2E	Fordham	1
1E	Massachusetts	4
2W	Virginia Tech	8
Lower round 1
2E	Fordham	6
1E	Massachusetts	14

Upper final
1W	Xavier	2
2W	Virginia Tech	17
Lower final
1W	Xavier	1
1E	Massachusetts	6

Final
2W	Virginia Tech	13
1E	Massachusetts	8

== All-Tournament Team ==
The following players were named to the All-Tournament Team. Virginia Tech catcher Barry Gauch, one of five Hokies selected, was named Most Outstanding Player.

Massachusetts's shortstop Brad Gorrie, who was also selected in 1996 was named to the team for the second time.

Pos.	Name	Team
P	Scott Barnsby	Massachusetts
OF	Doug Clark	Massachusetts
C	Barry Gauch	Virginia Tech
1B	David Giglio	Massachusetts
SS	Brad Gorrie	Massachusetts
OF	Matt Griswold	Virginia Tech
SS	Kevin Kurilla	Virginia Tech
SS	Tony Martelli	Fordham
2B	Randy Martin	Virginia Tech
P	Denny Wagner	Virginia Tech
P	Louie Witte	Xavier
