= 1985 Atlantic 10 Conference baseball tournament =

American college baseball tournament

- Teams: 4
- Format: Double-elimination tournament
- Finals site: Hawley Field; Morgantown, WV
- Champions: West Virginia (2nd title)
- Winning coach: Dale Ramsburg (2nd title)
- MVP: Bob Bernardo (West Virginia, Player); Harry Daut (Temple, Pitcher) ()

1985 Atlantic 10 Conference baseball standings
	Conf.						Overall
Team	W		L		T	PCT	W		L		T	PCT
East
Temple ^{x}‍‍‍	9	–	2	–	0	.818	33	–	18	–	1	.644
UMass ‍‍‍	8	–	4	–	0	.667	20	–	18	–	0	.526
Rutgers ‍‍‍	6	–	6	–	0	.500	25	–	15	–	0	.625
Rhode Island ‍‍‍	5	–	7	–	0	.417	24	–	16	–	1	.598
Saint Joseph's ‍‍‍	2	–	10	–	0	.167	12	–	23	–	0	.343
West
West Virginia ^{x}‍‍‡‍^{y}	9	–	3	–	0	.750	27	–	16	–	0	.628
Penn State ^{x}‍‍‍	9	–	3	–	0	.750	27	–	14	–	0	.659
George Washington ‍‍‍	8	–	4	–	0	.667	18	–	20	–	2	.475
St. Bonaventure ‍‍‍	1	–	8	–	0	.111	17	–	13	–	0	.567
Duquesne ‍‍‍	0	–	9	–	0	.000	15	–	12	–	0	.556
x – Division champion ‡ – Tournament champion y – Invited to the NCAA tournament As of June 30, 1985; Rankings from Collegiate Baseball

The 1985 Atlantic Conference baseball tournament was held from May 3 through 5 to determine the champion of the NCAA Division I the Atlantic 10 Conference, for the 1985 NCAA Division I baseball season. This was the seventh iteration of the event, and was held at Hawley Field, home field of West Virginia in Morgantown, West Virginia. West Virginia won their second championship and earned the conference's automatic bid to the 1985 NCAA Division I baseball tournament.

== Format and seeding ==
The top two teams in each division advanced to the tournament, with each division winner playing the second place team from the opposite division in the first round. The teams played a double-elimination tournament. West Virginia claimed the top seed over Penn State by tiebreaker.

Team	W	L	Pct	GB	Seed
East Division
Temple	9	3	.750	—	1E
UMass	8	4	.667	1	2E
Rutgers	6	6	.500	3	—
Rhode Island	5	7	.417	4	—
Saint Joseph's	2	10	.167	7	—

Team	W	L	Pct	GB	Seed
Western Division
West Virginia	9	3	.750	—	1W
Penn State	9	3	.750	—	2W
George Washington	8	4	.667	1	—
St. Bonaventure	1	8	.111	6.5	—
Duquesne	0	9	.000	7.5	—

== Results ==
First round
1E	Temple	13
2W	Penn State	5
1W	West Virginia	20
2E	UMass	4
Lower round 1
2W	Penn State	22
2E	UMass	12

Semi-finals
1E	Temple	7
1W	West Virginia	3
Lower final
1W	West Virginia	14
2W	Penn State	9

Finals
1E	Temple	11	7
1W	West Virginia	14	8^{10}
