= 2001 Atlantic 10 Conference baseball tournament =

American college baseball tournament

- Teams: 4
- Format: Four-team double elimination
- Finals site: Cracker Jack Stadium; Kissimmee, FL
- Champions: Temple (3rd title)
- Winning coach: Skip Wilson (3rd title)
- MVP: Kyle Sweppenhiser (Temple)

The 2001 Atlantic 10 Conference Baseball Championship was held at Cracker Jack Stadium in Kissimmee, Florida, from May 17 through 19. It featured the top four regular-season finishers of the conference's 11 teams. 2001 was the final season that the tournament had four teams; in 2002, it moved to a six-team format. Third-seeded Richmond defeated George Washington in the title game to win the tournament for the third time, earning the Atlantic 10's automatic bid to the 2001 NCAA tournament.

== Seeding ==
The league's top four teams, based on winning percentage in the 22-game regular-season schedule, were seeded one through four. In the tie for third place, the conference's tiebreakers gave Dayton the second seed over Temple.

Team	W	L	Pct.	GB	Seed
Massachusetts	16	6	.727	–	1
Dayton	15	7	.682	1	2
Temple	15	7	.682	1	3
George Washington	13	9	.591	3	4
St. Bonaventure	12	10	.545	4	–
Rhode Island	10	12	.455	6	–
Saint Joseph's	10	12	.455	6	–
Fordham	10	12	.455	6	–
Xavier	8	14	.364	8	–
Duquesne	6	16	.273	10	–
La Salle	6	16	.273	10	–

== Bracket ==
First round
1	Massachusetts	4
4	George Washington	3
2	Dayton	2
3	Temple	3^{10}
Lower round 1
4	George Washington	11
3	Dayton	10

Semi-finals
1	Massachusetts	3
3	Temple	6
Lower final
1	Massachusetts	1
4	George Washington	9

Finals
3	Temple	8	11
4	George Washington	10	6

== All-Tournament Team ==
The following players were named to the All-Tournament Team. Temple third baseman Kyle Sweppenhiser, one of five Owls selected, was named Most Outstanding Player.

This was the second time Sweppenhiser was selected to the time, after having first been selected in 1999 George Washington's Mike Bassett and Dan Rouhier were both named for the second time. Bassett was first selected in 2000, Rouhier in 1998.

Pos.	Name	Team
OF	Mike Bassett	George Washington
DH	Travis Crowder	George Washington
1B	Robert Cucinotta	Temple
C	Jeff Fertitta	George Washington
OF	Joe Lyall	Temple
P	Greg Powell	Temple
OF/1B	Dan Rouhier	George Washington
2B	Adam Stojanowski	Massachusetts
3B	Kyle Sweppenhiser	Temple
SS	Jim Tully	Temple
OF	Brooks Vogel	Dayton
SS	Jake Wald	George Washington
