= 1988 Atlantic 10 Conference baseball tournament =

American college baseball tournament

- Teams: 4
- Format: Double-elimination tournament
- Finals site: Bear Stadium (Pennsylvania); Boyertown, Pennsylvania
- Champions: Rutgers (3rd title)
- Winning coach: Fred Hill (2nd title)
- MVP: Drew Comeau (UMass, Player); Darrin Winston (Rutgers, Pitcher) ()

1988 Atlantic 10 Conference baseball standings
	Conf.						Overall
Team	W		L		T	PCT	W		L		T	PCT
East
Rutgers ^{x}‍‍‡‍^{y}	14	–	2	–	0	.875	38	–	21	–	1	.642
UMass ‍‍‍	9	–	7	–	0	.563	36	–	16	–	0	.692
Temple ‍‍‍	8	–	8	–	0	.500	27	–	27	–	0	.500
Rhode Island ‍‍‍	5	–	11	–	0	.313	10	–	28	–	0	.263
Saint Joseph's ‍‍‍	4	–	12	–	0	.250	16	–	23	–	1	.413
West
West Virginia ^{x}‍‍‍	12	–	4	–	0	.750	33	–	17	–	1	.657
George Washington ‍‍‍	11	–	5	–	0	.688	30	–	26	–	1	.535
Penn State ‍‍‍	8	–	8	–	0	.500	24	–	26	–	0	.480
St. Bonaventure ‍‍‍	7	–	9	–	0	.438	26	–	21	–	0	.553
Duquesne ‍‍‍	2	–	14	–	0	.125	13	–	16	–	0	.448
x – Division champion ‡ – Tournament champion y – Invited to the NCAA tournament As of June 30, 1988; Rankings from Collegiate Baseball

The 1988 Atlantic Conference baseball tournament was held from May 13 through 15, 1988 to determine the champion of the NCAA Division I the Atlantic 10 Conference, for the 1988 NCAA Division I baseball season. This was the tenth iteration of the event, and was held at Bear Stadium in Boyertown, Pennsylvania. Rutgers won their third championship and earned the conference's automatic bid to the 1988 NCAA Division I baseball tournament.

== Format and seeding ==
The top two teams in each division advanced to the tournament, with each division winner playing the second place team from the opposite division in the first round. The teams played a double-elimination tournament. West Virginia claimed the top seed over Penn State and Rhode Island claimed the second seed in the East over Saint Joseph's by tiebreaker.

Team	W	L	Pct	GB	Seed
East Division
Rutgers	14	2	.875	—	1E
UMass	9	7	.563	5	2E
Temple	8	8	.500	6	—
Rhode Island	5	11	.313	9	—
Saint Joseph's	4	12	.250	10	—

Team	W	L	Pct	GB	Seed
Western Division
West Virginia	12	4	.750	—	1W
George Washington	11	5	.688	1	2W
Penn State	8	8	.500	4	—
St. Bonaventure	7	9	.438	5	—
Duquesne	2	14	.125	10	—

== Results ==
First round
1E	Rutgers	13
2W	George Washington	2
1W	West Virginia	9
2E	UMass	16
Lower round 1
2W	George Washington	3
1W	West Virginia	6

Semi-finals
1E	Rutgers	10
2E	UMass	1
Lower final
2E	UMass	20
1W	West Virginia	2

Finals
1E	Rutgers	4	8
2E	UMass	8	5
