= 1993 Atlantic 10 Conference baseball tournament =

American college baseball tournament

- Teams: 4
- Format: Four-team double elimination
- Finals site: Bear Stadium (Boyertown); Boyertown, PA
- Champions: Rutgers (6th title)
- Winning coach: Fred Hill (5th title)
- MVP: Doug Alongi (Rutgers)

The 1993 Atlantic 10 Conference Baseball Championship was held at Bear Stadium in Boyertown, Pennsylvania from May 14 through 16. The double elimination tournament featured the league's top four regular-season finishers. Top-seeded Rutgers defeated West Virginia in the title game to win the tournament for the sixth time, earning the Atlantic 10's automatic bid to the 1993 NCAA tournament.

== Seeding and format ==
The league's top four teams, based on winning percentage in the 21-game regular-season schedule, were seeded one through four.

A-10 tiebreaking procedures gave George Washington the fourth seed over Saint Joseph's.

Team	W	L	Pct.	GB	Seed
Rutgers	14	6	.700	–	1
West Virginia	13	8	.619	1.5	2
Temple	11	9	.550	3	3
George Washington	10	10	.500	4	4
Saint Joseph's	10	10	.500	4	–
Massachusetts	9	11	.450	5	–
St. Bonaventure	8	12	.400	6	–
Rhode Island	5	14	.263	8.5	–

== Bracket ==
Upper round 1
1	Rutgers	4
4	George Washington	2
2	West Virginia	3
3	Temple	8
Lower round 1
4	George Washington	2
2	West Virginia	9

Upper final
1	Rutgers	5
3	Temple	2
Lower final
3	Temple	4
2	West Virginia	10

Final
1	Rutgers	7	–
2	West Virginia	6	–

== All-Tournament ==
Rutgers's Doug Alongi was named Most Outstanding Player, while Temple's Steve Hoppel was named Most Outstanding Pitcher.
