= 1995 Atlantic 10 Conference baseball tournament =

American college baseball tournament

- Teams: 4
- Format: Four-team double elimination
- Finals site: Bear Stadium (Boyertown); Boyertown, PA
- Champions: Massachusetts (2nd title)
- Winning coach: Mike Stone (1st title)
- MVP: Nelson Ubaldo (Massachusetts)

The 1995 Atlantic 10 Conference Baseball Championship was held at Bear Stadium in Boyertown, Pennsylvania from May 12 through 14. The double elimination tournament featured the top four regular-season finishers. Top-seeded Massachusetts defeated Rutgers in the title game to win the tournament for the second time, earning the Atlantic 10's automatic bid to the 1995 NCAA tournament.

== Seeding and format ==
The league's top four teams, based on winning percentage in the 24-game regular-season schedule, were seeded one through four.

Team	W	L	Pct.	GB	Seed
Massachusetts	19	5	.792	–	1
George Washington	17	7	.708	2	2
St. Bonaventure	12	9	.571	5.5	3
Rutgers	13	11	.542	6	4
Saint Joseph's	12	12	.500	7	–
West Virginia	11	13	.458	8	–
Temple	9	15	.375	10	–
Duquesne	7	17	.292	12	–
Rhode Island	5	16	.238	13.5	–

== Bracket ==
Upper round 1
1	Massachusetts	10
4	Rutgers	9
2	George Washington	1
3	St. Bonaventure	3
Lower round 1
4	Rutgers	9
2	George Washington	4

Upper final
1	Massachusetts	13
3	St. Bonaventure	5
Lower final
4	Rutgers	16
3	St. Bonaventure	12

Final
1	Massachusetts
4	Rutgers

== All-Tournament ==
Massachusetts's Nelson Ubaldo was named Most Outstanding Player, while St. Bonaventure's Andy Steinorth was named Most Outstanding Pitcher.
