= 1996 Atlantic 10 Conference baseball tournament =

American college baseball tournament

- Teams: 4
- Format: Four-team double elimination
- Finals site: Bear Stadium (Boyertown); Boyertown, PA
- Champions: Massachusetts (3rd title)
- Winning coach: Mike Stone (2nd title)
- MVP: Nate Murphy (Massachusetts)

The 1996 Atlantic 10 Conference Baseball Championship was held at Bear Stadium in Boyertown, Pennsylvania from May 10 through 12. The double elimination tournament featured the top two regular-season finishers of each of the conference's six-team divisions. East Division top seed Massachusetts defeated Virginia Tech in the title game to win the tournament for the third time, earning the Atlantic 10's automatic bid to the 1996 NCAA tournament.

== Seeding and format ==
Each division's top teams, based on winning percentage in the 20-game regular season schedule, qualified for the field. In the opening round of the four-team double-elimination format, the East Division champion played the West Division runner-up, and vice versa.

Team	W	L	T	Pct.	GB	Seed
East Division
Massachusetts	15	5	0	.750	–	1E
Temple	12	8	0	.600	3	2E
St. Bonaventure	10	10	0	.500	5	–
Fordham	8	11	1	.425	6.5	–
Saint Joseph's	8	11	1	.425	6.5	–
Rhode Island	6	14	0	.300	9	–
West Division
Virginia Tech	16	4	0	.800	–	1W
Xavier	11	8	0	.579	4.5	2W
George Washington	10	10	0	.500	6	–
Dayton	8	11	0	.421	7.5	–
La Salle	8	12	0	.400	8	–
Duquesne	6	14	0	.300	10	–

== Bracket ==
Upper round 1
1E	Massachusetts	16
2W	Xavier	3
1W	Virginia Tech	4
2E	Temple	2
Lower round 1
2W	Xavier	6
2E	Temple	3

Upper final
1E	Massachusetts	1
1W	Virginia Tech	4
Lower final
1E	Massachusetts	6
2W	Xavier	1

Final
1W	Virginia Tech
1E	Massachusetts

== All-Tournament Team ==
The following players were named to the All-Tournament Team. Massachusetts's Nate Murphy, one of five Minutemen selected, was named Most Outstanding Player.

1996 was the first time the league named an All-Tournament Team. Previously, it had named only a Most Outstanding Player and Pitcher.

Pos.	Name	Team
P	David Dart	Massachusetts
P	Brian Fitzgerald	Virginia Tech
C	Michael Gancasz	Temple
SS	Brad Gorrie	Massachusetts
P	Jon Hand	Virginia Tech
C/DH	Josh Herman	Virginia Tech
C	Andy Kiah	Massachusetts
3B	Bryan Mazzaferro	Massachusetts
OF	Nate Murphy	Massachusetts
OF	Austin Rappe	Virginia Tech
SS	Marty Sparks	Xavier
