= 1987 Atlantic 10 Conference baseball tournament =

American college baseball tournament

- Teams: 4
- Format: Double-elimination tournament
- Finals site: Bear Stadium (Pennsylvania); Boyertown, PA
- Champions: West Virginia (3rd title)
- Winning coach: Dale Ramsburg (3rd title)
- MVP: Jon Szynal (West Virginia, Player); Dave Perry (West Virginia, Pitcher) ()

1987 Atlantic 10 Conference baseball standings
	Conf.						Overall
Team	W		L		T	PCT	W		L		T	PCT
East
Rutgers ^{x}‍‍‍	11	–	4	–	1	.719	36	–	14	–	1	.716
UMass ‍‍‍	10	–	4	–	0	.714	22	–	16	–	0	.579
Temple ‍‍‍	10	–	5	–	1	.656	26	–	20	–	1	.564
Rhode Island ‍‍‍	4	–	10	–	0	.286	9	–	22	–	0	.290
Saint Joseph's ‍‍‍	2	–	14	–	0	.125	9	–	26	–	0	.257
West
West Virginia ^{x}‍‍‡‍^{y}	9	–	2	–	0	.818	24	–	14	–	1	.628
Penn State ‍‍‍	11	–	3	–	0	.786	29	–	19	–	0	.604
George Washington ‍‍‍	8	–	8	–	0	.500	19	–	25	–	0	.432
St. Bonaventure ‍‍‍	4	–	10	–	0	.286	11	–	18	–	0	.379
Duquesne ‍‍‍	2	–	14	–	0	.125	19	–	17	–	0	.528
x – Division champion ‡ – Tournament champion y – Invited to the NCAA tournament As of June 30, 1987; Rankings from Collegiate Baseball

The 1987 Atlantic Conference baseball tournament was held from May 8 through 10, 1987 to determine the champion of the NCAA Division I the Atlantic 10 Conference, for the 1987 NCAA Division I baseball season. This was the ninth iteration of the event, and was held at Bear Stadium in Boyertown, Pennsylvania. West Virginia won their third championship and earned the conference's automatic bid to the 1987 NCAA Division I baseball tournament.

== Format and seeding ==
The top two teams in each division advanced to the tournament, with each division winner playing the second place team from the opposite division in the first round. The teams played a double-elimination tournament.

Team	W	L	T	Pct	GB	Seed
East Division
Rutgers	11	4	1	.719	—	1E
UMass	10	4	0	.714	.5	2E
Temple	10	5	1	.656	1	—
Rhode Island	4	10	0	.286	6.5	—
Saint Joseph's	2	10	0	.167	7	—

Team	W	L	T	Pct	GB	Seed
Western Division
West Virginia	13	3	0	.813	—	1W
Penn State	11	3	0	.786	1	2W
George Washington	8	8	0	.500	5	—
St. Bonaventure	4	10	0	.286	8	—
Duquesne	2	14	0	.125	11	—

== Results ==
First round
1E	Rutgers	8
2W	Penn State	1
1W	West Virginia	1
2E	UMass	0
Lower round 1
2W	Penn State	4
2E	UMass	10

Semi-finals
1E	Rutgers	0
1W	West Virginia	2
Lower final
1E	Rutgers	3
2E	UMass	8

Finals
1W	West Virginia	13	—
2E	UMass	3	—
