= 1994 Atlantic 10 Conference baseball tournament =

American college baseball tournament

- Teams: 4
- Format: Four-team double elimination
- Finals site: Bear Stadium (Boyertown); Boyertown, PA
- Champions: West Virginia (4th title)
- Winning coach: Dale Ramsburg (4th title)
- MVP: Mark Landers (West Virginia)

The 1994 Atlantic 10 Conference baseball tournament was the postseason baseball tournament for the 1994 season of the Atlantic 10 Conference. The 13th edition of the tournament, it took place at Bear Stadium in Boyertown, Pennsylvania. The double elimination tournament began on May 20 and concluded on May 24. It featured the league's top four regular-season finishers. Second-seeded West Virginia defeated St. Bonaventure in the title game to win the tournament for the fourth time, earning the Atlantic 10's bid to participate in a "Play-In Series" against MAAC champion Saint Peter's to play in the 1994 NCAA tournament.

== Seeding and format ==
The league's top four teams, based on winning percentage in the 24-game regular-season schedule, were seeded one through four.

Team	W	L	Pct.	GB	Seed
Massachusetts	19	4	.826	–	1
West Virginia	17	4	.810	2	2
Rutgers	15	4	.789	4	3
St. Bonaventure	11	10	.524	7	4
George Washington	12	11	.522	7	–
Temple	9	12	.429	9	–
Saint Joseph's	8	15	.348	12	–
Duquesne	5	15	.250	12.5	–
Rhode Island	1	22	.043	18	–

== Bracket ==
Upper round 1
1	Massachusetts	1
4	St. Bonaventure	2
2	West Virginia	12
3	Rutgers	1
Lower round 1
1	Massachusetts	9
3	Rutgers	3

Upper final
4	St. Bonaventure	6
2	West Virginia	1
Lower final
2	West Virginia	4
1	Massachusetts	2

Final
4	St. Bonaventure	9	4
2	West Virginia	11	10

== All-Tournament ==
West Virginia's Mark Landers was named Most Outstanding Player. His teammate Ryan Williams was named Most Outstanding Pitcher.
