= Matt Reynolds (baseball coach) =

American baseball coach

Current position
- Title: Head coach
- Team: Wesleyan Cardinals
- Conference: NESCAC
- Record: 13–23–0 (.361)

Biographical details
- Born: 1981 or 1982 (age 43–44); South Boston, Massachusetts, U.S.

Playing career
- 2001–2002: Maine
- 2003–2004: Massachusetts
- Position: First baseman / Third baseman

Coaching career (HC unless noted)
- 2005–2007: Massachusetts (GA)
- 2008–2014: Navy (asst.)
- 2015–2017: Washington College
- 2018–2025: Massachusetts
- 2026–present: Wesleyan

Head coaching record
- Overall: 193–291–3 (.399)
- Tournaments: A10: 0–2; NCAA: 0–0

Matthew Reynolds (born 1981 or 1982) is an American college baseball coach and former player. Reynolds is the head coach of the Wesleyan Cardinals baseball team.

Reynolds played college baseball at the University of Maine for coach Paul Kostacopoulos before transferring to the University of Massachusetts Amherst to play for coach Mike Stone from 2003 to 2004. Reynolds has previously been head baseball coach at Washington College and the University of Massachusetts Amherst.

== Playing career ==
Reynolds attended Boston Latin School in Boston, Massachusetts. Reynolds then enrolled at the University of Maine, to play college baseball for the Maine Black Bears baseball team.

As a freshman at the University of Maine in 2001, Reynolds had a .317 batting average, a .360 on-base percentage (OBP) and a .423 SLG.

As a sophomore in 2002, Reynolds batted .287 with a .383 SLG, 1 home run, and 14 RBIs.

In the 2003 season as a junior, Reynolds transferred to the University of Massachusetts Amherst to play for the UMass Minutemen baseball team and hit 12 doubles and 13 RBIs.

Reynolds had his best season as a senior in 2004, leading the team in home runs (7) and was a key contribute with RBIs (39), batting average (.293) and slugging (.461). He was named All-Atlantic 10 Conference baseball tournament Team.

== Coaching career ==
In 2005, Reynolds began his coaching career as a graduate assistant at Massachusetts. He spent 3 years with the program. In the summer of 2007, Reynolds agreed to join his former coach, Paul Kostacopoulos as an assistant coach for the Navy Midshipmen baseball program. Reynolds spent 7 season with the Midshipmen until he was hired as the head coach of the Washington College Shoreman baseball program on July 8, 2014. The Shoremen compiled a 59–50–1 record under Reynolds.

On May 26, 2017, Reynolds was hired as the head coach at UMass. The Minutemen finished the 2018 season 15–29.

In August 2025, it was reported that Reynolds was leaving UMass to become the head coach at Wesleyan University in Middletown, Connecticut. On August 21, 2025, Reynolds was officially announced as Wesleyan University head baseball coach.

== Head coaching record ==
Record table
Season	Team	Overall	Conference	Standing	Postseason
Washington College Shoreman (Centennial Conference) (2015–2017)
2015	Washington College	18–15	9–9	T-4th	
2016	Washington College	26–12–1	10–8	5th	
2017	Washington College	15–23	6–12	9th	
Washington College:		59–50–1	25–29		
Massachusetts Minutemen (Atlantic 10 Conference) (2018–2025)
2018	Massachusetts	15–29	6–18	12th	
2019	Massachusetts	18–27	8–14	10th	
2020	Massachusetts	1–8	0–0		Season canceled due to COVID-19
2021	Massachusetts	13–30	3–16	6th (North)	
2022	Massachusetts	22–26–1	8–16	11th	
2023	Massachusetts	14–35	6–18	11th	
2024	Massachusetts	24–29	13–11	T-4th	A-10 Tournament
2025	Massachusetts	14–34–1	7–23	12th	
Massachusetts:		121–218–2 (.358)	51–116 (.305)		
Wesleyan Cardinals (NESCAC) (2026–present)
2026	Wesleyan	13–23	6–6	T-3rd (West)	
Wesleyan:		13–23 (.361)	6–6 (.500)		
Total:		193–291–3 (.399)			
National champion Postseason invitational champion Conference regular season champion Conference regular season and conference tournament champion Division regular season champion Division regular season and conference tournament champion Conference tournament champion

== See also ==
- List of current NCAA Division I baseball coaches
