= Jim Houlihan Park at Jack Coffey Field =

Baseball venue in the Bronx, New York, US

Houlihan Park
- Interactive map of Houlihan Park
- Full name: Jim Houlihan Park at Jack Coffey Field
- Location: Fordham University campus; Dr. Theodore Kazimiroff Blvd., Bronx, New York, United States
- Coordinates: 40.860784°N 73.882794°W
- Owner: Fordham University
- Operator: Fordham University
- Capacity: 1,000
- Surface: FieldTurf
- Scoreboard: Electronic
- Field size: Left Field: 338 feet (103 m); Center Field: 400 feet (120 m); Right Field: 338 feet (103 m)

Construction
- Renovated: 2005

Tenants
- Fordham Rams baseball (NCAA Division I A-10); A-10 Tournament (2006, 2012)

Jim Houlihan Park at Jack Coffey Field, or simply Houlihan Park, is a baseball venue located on the Rose Hill campus of Fordham University in the Bronx, New York, United States. It is the home field of the Fordham Rams baseball team of the NCAA Division I Atlantic 10 Conference. The field is part of a larger athletic facility called Jack Coffey Field.

== Renovation and renaming ==
The park is named in honor of Fordham alumnus Jim Houlihan. Houlihan made a $1 million donation to name the newly renovated field, which had previously been referred to simply as Coffey Field. The field was resurfaced with FieldTurf as a part of 2005 renovations. The renovations included modifications to the playing surface, new lights, practice facilities, dugouts, grandstands, and an added press box.

== Events ==
The field has hosted the 2006, 2012, and 2016 Atlantic 10 Conference baseball tournaments, won by Saint Louis, Dayton, and Rhode Island respectively.

== See also ==
- List of NCAA Division I baseball venues
