= 1990 Atlantic 10 Conference baseball tournament =

American college baseball tournament

- Teams: 4
- Format: Four-team double elimination
- Finals site: Bear Stadium (Boyertown); Boyertown, PA
- Champions: Rutgers (4th title)
- Winning coach: Fred Hill (3rd title)
- MVP: Paul Prosser (West Virginia)

The 1990 Atlantic 10 Conference Baseball Championship was held at Bear Stadium in Boyertown, Pennsylvania from May 11 through 14. The double elimination tournament featured the top two regular-season finishers from both of the league's divisions. East top seed Rutgers defeated West Virginia in the title game to win the tournament for the fourth time, earning the Atlantic 10's automatic bid to the 1990 NCAA tournament.

== Seeding and format ==
Each division's top teams, based on winning percentage in the 16-game regular season schedule, qualified for the field. In the opening round of the four-team double-elimination format, the East Division champion played the West Division runner-up, and vice versa.

Team	W	L	Pct.	GB	Seed
East Division
Rutgers	14	2	.875	–	1E
Massachusetts	12	4	.750	2	2E
Rhode Island	6	10	.375	8	–
Temple	5	11	.313	9	–
Saint Joseph's	3	13	.188	9	–
West Division
George Washington	13	3	.813	–	1W
West Virginia	12	4	.750	1	2W
St. Bonaventure	7	9	.438	6	–
Penn State	6	10	.375	7	–
Duquesne	2	14	.125	11	–

== Bracket ==
First round
1E	Rutgers	2
2W	West Virginia	1
1W	George Washington	0
2E	Massachusetts	13
Lower round 1
2W	West Virginia	11
1W	George Washington	10

Semi-finals
1E	Rutgers	8^{14}
2E	Massachusetts	7
Lower final
2E	Massachusetts	1
2W	West Virginia	9

Finals
1E	Rutgers	2	6
2W	West Virginia	11	4

== All-Tournament ==
West Virginia's Paul Prosser was named Most Outstanding Player, while Rutgers's Darrin Kotch was named Most Outstanding Pitcher.
