= Matthew Reynolds =

Matthew Reynolds may refer to:

- Matthew A. Reynolds, United States Assistant Secretary of State for Legislative Affairs
- Matt Reynolds (pitcher) (born 1984), former baseball pitcher
- Matt Reynolds (infielder) (born 1990), baseball infielder
- Matt Reynolds (baseball coach), baseball coach
- Matt Reynolds (basketball), basketball coach
- Matt Reynolds (American football) (born 1986), American football offensive tackle for the Kansas City Chiefs
