= 1991 Atlantic 10 Conference baseball tournament =

American college baseball tournament

- Teams: 4
- Format: Four-team double elimination
- Finals site: Bear Stadium (Boyertown); Boyertown, PA
- Champions: Rutgers (5th title)
- Winning coach: Fred Hill (4th title)
- MVP: Jason Imperial (Rutgers)

The 1991 Atlantic 10 Conference Baseball Championship was held at Bear Stadium in Boyertown, Pennsylvania from May 10 through 12. The double elimination tournament featured the top two regular-season finishers from both of the league's divisions. East top seed Rutgers defeated Massachusetts in the title game to win the tournament for the fifth time, earning the Atlantic 10's automatic bid to the 1991 NCAA tournament.

== Seeding and format ==
Each division's top teams, based on winning percentage in the 16-game regular season schedule, qualified for the field. In the opening round of the four-team double-elimination format, the East Division champion played the West Division runner-up, and vice versa.

| Team | W | L | Pct. | GB | Seed |
|---|---|---|---|---|---|
East Division
| Rutgers | 11 | 5 | .688 | – | 1E |
| Massachusetts | 10 | 6 | .625 | 1 | 2E |
| Temple | 9 | 7 | .563 | 2 | – |
| Saint Joseph's | 6 | 10 | .375 | 5 | – |
| Rhode Island | 4 | 12 | .250 | 7 | – |
West Division
| Penn State | 11 | 5 | .688 | – | 1W |
| George Washington | 10 | 6 | .625 | 1 | 2W |
| West Virginia | 9 | 7 | .563 | 2 | – |
| St. Bonaventure | 7 | 9 | .438 | 4 | – |
| Duquesne | 3 | 13 | .188 | 8 | – |

== Bracket ==
Upper round 1
1W | Penn State | 3
2E | Massachusetts | 4
1E | Rutgers | 4
2W | George Washington | 2
Lower round 1
1W | Penn State | 7
2W | George Washington | 2

Upper final
2E | Massachusetts | 11
1E | Rutgers | 6
Lower final
1E | Rutgers | 12
1W | Penn State | 6

Final
2E | Massachusetts | 4 | 3
1E | Rutgers | 5 | 8

== All-Tournament ==
Rutgers's Jason Imperial was named Most Outstanding Player, and his teammate Dave Hoehler was named Most Outstanding Pitcher.
