= 1980 Eastern 8 Conference baseball tournament =

American college baseball tournament

- Teams: 5
- Finals site: The Ellipse; Washington, D.C.
- Champions: UMass (1st title)
- Winning coach: Dick Bergquist (1st title)

The 1980 Eastern 8 Conference baseball tournament was held on May 18 and 19, 1980 to determine the champion of the NCAA Division I Eastern 8 Conference, renamed in 1982 as the Atlantic 10 Conference, for the 1980 NCAA Division I baseball season. This was the second iteration of the event, and was held on The Ellipse, home field of George Washington, in Washington, D.C. UMass won the championship and the conference's automatic bid to the 1980 NCAA Division I baseball tournament.

== Format ==
The tournament followed a double-elimination format, with Duquesne receiving a first round bye.

== Bracket ==
First round
1	Rutgers	5
6	West Virginia	1
2
5
3
4

Second round
Duquesne	1
Rutgers	11
UMass	13
George Washington	3
West Virginia	8
George Washington	9

Third round
Rutgers	6
UMass	17
Duquesne	14
George Washington	15

Semifinals
Rutgers	17
George Washington	13

Final
UMass	12	—
Rutgers	0	—
