= 2011 Atlantic 10 Conference baseball tournament =

American college baseball tournament

- Teams: 6
- Format: Six-team double elimination First-round byes for top two seeds
- Finals site: Campbell's Field; Camden, NJ
- Champions: Charlotte (3rd title)
- Winning coach: Loren Hibbs (3rd title)
- MVP: Corey Shaylor (Charlotte)

2011 Atlantic 10 Conference baseball standings
	Conf.				Overall
Team	W		L	PCT	W		L	PCT
Charlotte ‍†‍‡‍^{y}	17	–	7	.708	43	–	16	.729
Rhode Island ‍‍‍	16	–	9	.640	31	–	33	.484
Dayton ‍‍‍	15	–	9	.625	32	–	27	.542
Xavier ‍‍‍	14	–	10	.583	30	–	27	.526
La Salle ‍‍‍	13	–	11	.542	28	–	26	.519
Richmond ‍‍‍	13	–	11	.542	29	–	27	.518
St. Bonaventure ‍‍‍	13	–	11	.542	23	–	23	.500
Fordham ‍‍‍	12	–	11	.522	31	–	23	.574
Saint Joseph's ‍‍‍	11	–	13	.458	21	–	31	.404
Saint Louis ‍‍‍	10	–	14	.417	29	–	26	.527
George Washington ‍‍‍	9	–	15	.375	19	–	36	.345
UMass ‍‍‍	8	–	15	.348	17	–	29	.370
Temple ‍‍‍	4	–	20	.167	24	–	29	.453
† – Conference champion ‡ – Tournament champion y – Invited to the NCAA tournament As of June 30, 2011; Rankings from Collegiate Baseball

The 2011 Atlantic 10 Conference Baseball Championship was held from May 25 through 28 at Campbell's Field in Camden, New Jersey. It featured the top six regular-season finishers of the conference's 13 teams. Top-seeded Charlotte defeated Richmond in the title game to win the tournament for the third time, earning the A-10's automatic bid to the 2011 NCAA tournament.

== Seeding ==
The league's top six teams, based on winning percentage in the 24-game regular-season schedule, were seeded one through six. The top two seeds, Charlotte and Rhode Island, received byes into the second round of play in the double elimination tournament.

Team	W	L	T	Pct.	GB	Seed
Charlotte	17	7	0	.708	–	1
Rhode Island	16	8	0	.667	1	2
Dayton	15	9	0	.625	2	3
Xavier	14	10	0	.583	3	4
Richmond (Note: In the three-way tie for fifth place, Richmond received the fifth seed due to its 5–1 cumulative record against La Salle and St. Bonaventure.)	13	11	0	.542	4	5
La Salle (Note: In the three-way tie for fifth place, La Salle received the sixth seed due to its 3–3 cumulative record against Richmond and St. Bonaventure.)	13	11	0	.542	4	6
St. Bonaventure (Note: In the three-way tie for fifth place, St. Bonaventure was left out of the tournament due to its 1–5 cumulative record against Richmond and La Salle.)	13	11	0	.542	4	–
Fordham	12	11	1	.521	4.5	–
Saint Joseph's	11	13	0	.458	6	–
Saint Louis	10	14	0	.417	7	–
George Washington	9	15	0	.375	8	–
UMass	8	15	1	.354	8.5	–
Temple	4	20	0	.167	13	–

== Results ==
Upper round 1
5	Richmond	5
4	Xavier	4
6	La Salle	6
3	Dayton	5
Lower round 1
4	Xavier	0
3	Dayton	1
6	La Salle	5
3	Dayton	10

Upper round 2
1	Charlotte	6
5	Richmond	0
2	Rhode Island	7
6	La Salle	4
Lower round 2
5	Richmond	10
3	Dayton	3

Upper final
1	Charlotte	5
2	Rhode Island	2
Lower final
2	Rhode Island	2
5	Richmond	7

Final
1	Charlotte	9
5	Richmond	4

== All-Tournament Team ==
The following players were named to the All-Tournament Team. Charlotte's Corey Shaylor, one of four 49ers selected, was named the Most Outstanding Player.

Name	Team
Jeff Flax	La Salle
Cameron Hobson	Dayton
C.J. Gillman	Dayton
Jeff Cammans	Rhode Island
Jacob Mayers	Richmond
Matt Zink	Richmond
Mike Mergenthaler	Richmond
Chris Cowell	Richmond
Justin Roland	Charlotte
Ross Steedley	Charlotte
Andrew Smith	Charlotte
Corey Shaylor	Charlotte
