= 1992 Atlantic 10 Conference baseball tournament =

American college baseball tournament

- Teams: 4
- Format: Four-team double elimination
- Finals site: Bear Stadium (Boyertown); Boyertown, PA
- Champions: George Washington (3rd title)
- Winning coach: Jay Murphy (1st title)
- MVP: Bill Reep (West Virginia)

The 1992 Atlantic 10 Conference Baseball Championship was held at Bear Stadium in Boyertown, Pennsylvania from May 9 through 11. The double elimination tournament featured the top two regular-season finishers from both of the league's divisions. West top seed George Washington defeated West Virginia in the title game to win the tournament for the third time, earning the Atlantic 10's automatic bid to the 1992 NCAA tournament.

== Seeding and format ==
Each division's top teams, based on winning percentage in the 16-game regular season schedule, qualified for the field. In the opening round of the four-team double-elimination format, the East Division champion played the West Division runner-up, and vice versa.

Team	W	L	Pct.	GB	Seed
East Division
Rutgers	14	2	.875	–	1E
Massachusetts	11	5	.688	3	2E
Saint Joseph's	6	10	.375	8	–
Temple	5	11	.313	9	–
Rhode Island	4	12	.250	10	–
West Division
George Washington	13	3	.813	–	1W
West Virginia	12	4	.750	1	2W
Duquesne	6	10	.375	7	–
St. Bonaventure	1	15	.063 (Note: St. Bonaventure forfeited 16 games for using an ineligible player.)	12	–

== Bracket ==
Upper round 1
1E	Rutgers	4
2W	West Virginia	6
1W	George Washington	9
2E	Massachusetts	5
Lower round 1
1E	Rutgers	8
2E	Massachusetts	9^{12}

Upper final
2W	West Virginia	2
1W	George Washington	9
Lower final
2W	West Virginia	7
2E	Massachusetts	6

Final
1W	George Washington	13	–
2W	West Virginia	10	–

== All-Tournament ==
West Virginia's Bill Reep was named Most Outstanding Player, and George Washington's Matt Aminoff was named Most Outstanding Pitcher.
