= 2009 Atlantic 10 Conference baseball tournament =

American college baseball tournament

- Teams: 6
- Format: Six-team double elimination First-round byes for top two seeds
- Finals site: Fifth Third Field (Dayton); Dayton, OH
- Champions: Xavier (1st title)
- Winning coach: Scott Googins (1st title)
- MVP: Billy O'Conner (Xavier)

The 2009 Atlantic 10 Conference Baseball Championship was held from May 20 through 23 at Fifth Third Field in Dayton, OH. It featured the top six regular-season finishers of the conference's 14 teams. Third-seeded Xavier defeated Rhode Island in the title game to win the tournament for the first time, earning the A-10's automatic bid to the 2009 NCAA tournament.

== Seeding and format ==
The league's top six teams, based on winning percentage in the 27-game regular-season schedule, were seeded one through six. The top two seeds, Dayton and Rhode Island, received byes into the second round of play in the double elimination tournament.

In the three-way tie for fourth-place, the conference's tiebreaking procedures gave Massachusetts the fourth seed, Fordham the fifth, and Charlotte the sixth.

Team	W	L	Pct.	GB	Seed
Dayton	21	6	.778	–	1
Rhode Island	19	6	.760	1	2
Xavier	18	9	.667	3	3
Massachusetts	16	11	.593	5	4
Fordham	16	11	.593	5	5
Charlotte	16	11	.593	5	6
Saint Louis	12	13	.480	8	–
George Washington	11	15	.423	9.5	–
Temple	11	15	.423	9.5	–
Richmond	11	16	.407	10	–
Saint Joseph's	9	17	.346	11.5	–
St. Bonaventure	9	17	.346	11.5	–
La Salle	8	18	.308	12.5	–
Duquesne	7	19	.269	13.5	–

== Bracket ==
Upper round 1
5	Fordham	4
4	Massachusetts	5
6	Charlotte	6
3	Xavier	8
Lower round 1
5	Fordham	10
6	Charlotte	13
4	Massachusetts	6 (Note: 10 innings.)
6	Charlotte	5

Upper round 2
1	Dayton	9
4	Massachusetts	5
2	Rhode Island	7
3	Xavier	6
Lower round 2
3	Xavier	6
4	Massachusetts	4

Upper final
1	Dayton	2
2	Rhode Island	9
Lower final
1	Dayton	3
3	Xavier	11

Final
2	Rhode Island	7
3	Xavier	9

== All-Tournament Team ==
The following players were named to the All-Tournament Team. Xavier's Billy O'Conner, one of six Musketeers selected, was named Most Outstanding Player.

Xavier's Jordan Conley and Charlotte's Rob Lyerly, both selected in 2008, were second-time selections.

Pos.	Name	Team
SS	Jordan Conley	Xavier
OF	Tom Coulombe	Rhode Island
1B	Bobby Freking	Xavier
1B	Mike Gedman	Massachusetts
P	Nick Greenwood	Rhode Island
2B	Zack Jacobs	Xavier
1B	Rob Lyerly	Charlotte
3B	John McCambridge	Xavier
C	Billy O'Conner	Xavier
2B	Oliver Palmer	Rhode Island
P	Zac Richard	Xavier
DH	Ben Thomas	Xavier
