= Hawley Field =

Baseball field in West Virginia, U.S.

- Interactive map of Hawley Field
- Full name: Hawley Field
- Location: Morgantown, West Virginia, USA
- Coordinates: 39.650715°N 79.984793°W
- Owner: West Virginia University
- Operator: West Virginia University
- Capacity: 1,500
- Surface: Natural grass
- Record attendance: 2,535 vs Pittsburgh (April 30, 2013)
- Field size: Left Field: 325 ft Left-Center Field: 375 ft Center Field: 390 ft Right-Center Field: 375 ft Right Field: 325 ft

Construction
- Opened: April 9, 1970
- Renovated: 2013
- Closed: 2014

Tenants
- West Virginia Mountaineers baseball (1970–2014); A-10 Tournament (1985)

Hawley Field is a baseball field in Morgantown, West Virginia, United States, that was named for Roy Hawley, former athletic director for Marshall University and West Virginia University. Along with Appalachian Power Park in Charleston, West Virginia, it served as one of two home venues of the West Virginia Mountaineers baseball team before the new Monongalia County Ballpark opened in April 2015. The stadium holds 1,500 spectators.

Hawley Field hosted the 1985 Atlantic 10 Conference baseball tournament, which the Mountaineers won on their home field.

Prior to the 2013 season, the facility's infield was resodded.

West Virginia joined the Big 12 Conference following the 2012 season. Since Hawley Field does not meet Big 12 Conference standards, and the state legislature turned down a plan for a taxpayer funded replacement, the Mountaineers played three of their four 2013 home conference series at Appalachian Power Park in Charleston and one at Linda K. Epling Stadium in Beckley (160 and 185 miles from campus, respectively). Non-conference games continued to be played at Hawley Field. In 2013, plans were announced to build a new venue in the nearby town of Granville for the Mountaineers baseball team. The new park, ultimately known as Monongalia County Ballpark, was originally scheduled to open at the start of the 2015 season, but weather-related construction delays forced the Mountaineers to play their first several 2015 home games in Washington, Pennsylvania until the new park opened that April.

In 2013, the Mountaineers ranked 50th among Division I baseball programs in attendance, averaging 1,328 per home game.

== See also ==
- List of NCAA Division I baseball venues
