= Chuck Hartman =

American baseball player (1934–2020)

Biographical details
- Born: December 20, 1934
- Died: November 2, 2020 (aged 85); Blacksburg, Virginia, U.S.

Playing career
- 1953–1957: North Carolina

Coaching career (HC unless noted)
- 1958–1959: High Point (Tennis, Asst. Basketball)
- 1960–1978: High Point
- 1979–2006: Virginia Tech

Head coaching record
- Overall: 1,444–816–8

Chuck Hartman (December 20, 1934 – November 2, 2020) was an American baseball coach who was the head coach at Virginia Tech from 1979 until 2006. He completed his 47-year coaching career with the fourth most wins as coach in Division I baseball history. His record was 1,444–816–8, including a 961–591–8 mark in his 28 seasons at Tech. Coach Hartman was the second Virginia Tech baseball coach to be inducted into the American Baseball Coaches Association Hall of Fame, in 2004. He is a member of 5 halls of fame including the Virginia Tech Sports Hall of Fame, in which he was inducted in 2002. He died on November 2, 2020.

== See also ==
- List of college baseball career coaching wins leaders
