= UMass Minutemen baseball =

American college baseball team

- 2026 UMass Minutemen baseball team
- Founded: 1877; 149 years ago
- University: University of Massachusetts Amherst
- Head coach: Max Weir
- Conference: Mid-American
- Location: Amherst, Massachusetts
- Home stadium: Earl Lorden Field
- Nickname: Minutemen
- Colors: Maroon and white

College World Series appearances
- 1954, 1969

NCAA tournament appearances
- 1954, 1955, 1956, 1966, 1967, 1969, 1971, 1973, 1978, 1995, 1996

Conference tournament champions
- Yankee: 1952, 1957, 1966, 1967, 1969, 1971, 1973, 1978, 1979, 1980; A-10: 1980, 1994, 1995, 1996

The UMass Minutemen baseball team is a varsity intercollegiate athletic team of the University of Massachusetts Amherst in Amherst, Massachusetts, United States. The team is a member of the Mid-American Conference, which is part of the National Collegiate Athletic Association's Division I. Massachusetts' first baseball team was fielded in 1877. The team plays its home games at Earl Lorden Field in Amherst, Massachusetts.

== Seasons ==
Record table
| Season | Coach | Overall | Conference | Standing | Postseason |
|---|---|---|---|---|---|
UMass (Independent) (1877–1951)
| 1877 | No Coach | 4-1 | | | |
| 1878 | No Coach | No Games | | | |
| 1879 | No Coach | No Games | | | |
| 1880 | No Coach | No Games | | | |
| 1881 | No Coach | No Games | | | |
| 1882 | No Coach | 1-1 | | | |
| 1883 | No Coach | 1-0 | | | |
| 1884 | No Coach | 0-1 | | | |
| 1885 | No Coach | 1-0 | | | |
| 1886 | No Coach | No Games | | | |
| 1887 | No Coach | 4-6 | | | |
| 1888 | No Coach | 2-2 | | | |
| 1889 | No Coach | 5-2 | | | |
| 1890 | No Coach | No Games | | | |
| 1891 | No Coach | 4-3 | | | |
| 1892 | No Coach | 5-2 | | | |
| 1893 | No Coach | 5-3 | | | |
| 1894 | No Coach | 0-7 | | | |
| 1895 | No Coach | 2-4 | | | |
| 1896 | No Coach | 3-3 | | | |
| 1897 | No Coach | 3-5 | | | |
| 1898 | No Coach | 3-7 | | | |
| 1899 | No Coach | 0-1 | | | |
| 1900 | No Coach | 3-7 | | | |
| 1901 | No Coach | 8-3 | | | |
| 1902 | No Coach | 2-6-1 | | | |
| 1903 | No Coach | 3-11 | | | |
| 1904 | Bowler | 4-10 | | | |
| 1905 | No Coach | 7-9 | | | |
| 1906 | No Coach | 5-10-1 | | | |
| 1907 | No Coach | 5-13 | | | |
| 1908 | Breckenridge | 10-6 | | | |
| 1909 | No Coach | 8-9 | | | |
| 1910 | No Coach | 5-11 | | | |
| 1911 | Fitzmaurice | 8-6-1 | | | |
| 1912 | Fitzmaurice | 9-6 | | | |
| 1913 | Fitzmaurice | 9-2 | | | |
| 1914 | Fitzmaurice | 10-6 | | | |
| 1915 | Fitzmaurice | 7-8 | | | |
| 1916 | Fitzmaurice | 3-8-1 | | | |
| 1917 | No Coach | 3-3 | | | |
| 1918 | No Coach | No Games | | | |
| 1919 | No Coach | 1-11 | | | |
| 1920 | Gore | 6-8 | | | |
| 1921 | Gore | 13-4 | | | |
| 1922 | Gore | 9-8 | | | |
| 1923 | Collins | 1-11 | | | |
| 1924 | Grayson | 5-7 | | | |
| 1925 | Ball | 6-8-2 | | | |
| 1926 | Ball | 4-12 | | | |
| 1927 | Ball | 7-8 | | | |
| 1928 | Ball | 2-9 | | | |
| 1929 | Ball | 3-11 | | | |
| 1930 | Ball | 7-9 | | | |
| 1931 | Ball | 6-10 | | | |
| 1932 | Taube | 9-6 | | | |
| 1933 | Taube | 7-5 | | | |
| 1934 | Taube | 8-5 | | | |
| 1935 | Taube | 7-6 | | | |
| 1936 | Caraway | 2-10-1 | | | |
| 1937 | Caraway | 11-3 | | | |
| 1938 | Caraway | 10-3 | | | |
| 1939 | Caraway | 14-5-1 | | | |
| 1940 | Caraway | 3-8 | | | |
| 1941 | Reid | 3-11 | | | |
| 1942 | Reid | 5-6 | | | |
| 1943 | Gill | Played High School Teams | | | |
| 1944 | Briggs | Played High School Teams | | | |
| 1945 | Eck | Played High School Teams | | | |
| 1946 | Reid | 3-7 | | | |
| 1947 | Reid | 3-12 | | | |
| 1948 | Lorden | 2-11 | | | |
| 1949 | Lorden | 5-11 | | | |
| 1950 | Lorden | 5-7 | | | |
| 1951 | Lorden | 10-8 | | | |
UMass (Yankee Conference) (1952–1980)
| 1952 | Lorden | 12-7 | 4-2 | | Yankee Conference champions |
| 1953 | Lorden | 11-8 | 3-2 | | |
| 1954 | Lorden | 15-7 | 4-2 | | College World Series; NCAA Tournament; New England Champions |
| 1955 | Lorden | 15-5 | 5-3 | | NCAA Tournament |
| 1956 | Lorden | 10-6-1 | 7-1-1 | | NCAA Tournament |
| 1957 | Lorden | 11-9 | 6-2 | | Yankee Conference champions |
| 1958 | Lorden | 7-11 | 5-5 | | |
| 1959 | Lorden | 10-6 | 4-5 | | |
| 1960 | Lorden | 10-7 | 5-5 | | |
| 1961 | Lorden | 11-5-1 | 7-2-1 | | |
| 1962 | Lorden | 15-5 | 7-3 | | |
| 1963 | Lorden | 10-7 | 2-6 | | |
| 1964 | Lorden | 7-10-1 | 3-6-1 | | |
| 1965 | Lorden | 7-11 | 6-4 | | |
| 1966 | Lorden | 14-6 | 7-3 | | NCAA Tournament; Yankee Conference champions |
| 1967 | Bergquist | 17-11 | 8-2 | | NCAA Tournament; New England champions Yankee Conference champions |
| 1968 | Bergquist | 12-10-1 | 6-4 | | |
| 1969 | Bergquist | 22-10 | 9-1 | | College World Series; NCAA Tournament; Yankee Conference champions |
| 1970 | Bergquist | 15-11 | 4-6 | | |
| 1971 | Bergquist | 21-10 | 12-3 | | NCAA Tournament; Yankee Conference champions |
| 1972 | Bergquist | 16-5 | 8-4 | | |
| 1973 | Bergquist | 21-9-1 | 6-1 | | NCAA Tournament; Yankee Conference champions |
| 1974 | Bergquist | 9-16 | 0-8 | | |
| 1975 | Bergquist | 11-18 | 4-4 | | |
| 1976 | Bergquist | 24-13 | 3-5 | | |
| 1977 | Bergquist | 20-17 | 5-3 | | |
| 1978 | Bergquist | 23-22 | 5-3 | | NCAA Tournament; New England champions Yankee Conference champions |
| 1979 | Bergquist | 24-17 | 7-3 | | Yankee Conference champions |
UMass (Atlantic 10 Conference) (1980–1982)
| 1980 | Bergquist | 19-13-2 | 7-3 | | Yankee Conference champions A-10 Champions |
| 1981 | Bergquist | 22-17 | 4-4 | 2nd (East) | |
| 1982 | Bergquist | 14-20-1 | 3-4 | 2nd (East) | |
UMass (ECAC New England) (1983–1983)
| 1983 | Bergquist | 20-17 | 9-5 | | |
UMass (Atlantic 10 Conference) (1984–2025)
| 1984 | Bergquist | 18-26 | 3-9 | 5th (East) | |
| 1985 | Bergquist | 26-19 | 8-4 | 2nd (East) | A-10 Tournament First Round |
| 1986 | Bergquist | 16-24 | 4-7 | 4th (East) | |
| 1987 | Bergquist | 22-16 | 10-4 | 2nd (East) | A-10 Tournament Final |
| 1988 | Stone | 36-16 | 9-7 | 2nd (East) | A-10 Tournament Final |
| 1989 | Stone | 17-27 | 5-11 | 4th (East) | |
| 1990 | Stone | 26-20 | 12-4 | 2nd (East) | A-10 Tournament Semifinal |
| 1991 | Stone | 26-25-1 | 10-6 | 2nd (East) | A-10 Tournament Final |
| 1992 | Stone | 25-16 | 11-5 | 2nd (East) | A-10 Tournament Semifinal |
| 1993 | Stone | 18-21 | 9-11 | 6th | |
| 1994 | Stone | 31-17 | 19-4 | 1st | Atlantic 10 Reg. Season Champions; A-10 Tournament Semifinal |
| 1995 | Stone | 38-14 | 19-5 | 1st | NCAA Tournament; Atlantic 10 Champions |
| 1996 | Stone | 40-13 | 15-5 | 1st (East) | NCAA Tournament; Atlantic 10 Champions |
| 1997 | Stone | 35-12 | 17-4 | 1st (East) | Atlantic 10 Eastern Division Champions; A-10 Tournament Final |
| 1998 | Stone | 27-12 | 15-3 | 1st (East) | Atlantic 10 Eastern Division Champions; A-10 Tournament Semifinal |
| 1999 | Stone | 26-23 | 13-8 | 1st (East) | Atlantic 10 Eastern Division Champions; A-10 Tournament Semifinal |
| 2000 | Stone | 26-22-1 | 11-9-1 | 2nd (East) | A-10 Tournament Final |
| 2001 | Stone | 27-19 | 15-5 | 1st | Atlantic 10 Regular Season Champions; A-10 Tournament Semifinal |
| 2002 | Stone | 21-26 | 9-15 | 5th (East) | |
| 2003 | Stone | 26-19 | 14-7 | 1st (East) | Atlantic 10 Eastern Division Champions; A-10 Tournament Final |
| 2004 | Stone | 19-26 | 10-14 | 4th (East) | |
| 2005 | Stone | 16-33 | 9-15 | 3rd (East) | |
| 2006 | Stone | 14-30 | 11-16 | 11th | |
| 2007 | Stone | 22-25 | 13-14 | 8th | |
| 2008 | Stone | 18-27 | 11-16 | 11th | |
| 2009 | Stone | 27-26 | 16-11 | 4th | A-10 Tournament Quarterfinal |
| 2010 | Stone | 19-27 | 13-14 | 8th | |
| 2011 | Stone | 17-29-1 | 8-15-1 | 12th | |
| 2012 | Stone | 22-22 | 14-10 | 4th | A-10 Tournament First Round |
| 2013 | Stone | 14-31 | 7-17 | 14th | |
| 2014 | Stone | 15-31 | 12-15 | 9th | |
| 2015 | Stone | 16-27 | 12-12 | 10th | |
| 2016 | Stone | 18-27 | 11-13 | 8th | |
| 2017 | Stone | 15-32 | 8-16 | 11th | |
| 2018 | Reynolds | 15-29 | 6-18 | 12th | |
| 2019 | Reynolds | 18-27 | 8-14 | 10th | |
| 2020 | Reynolds | 1-8 | | | COVID-19 pandemic |
| 2021 | Reynolds | 13-30 | 3-17 | 6th (North) | |
| 2022 | Reynolds | 22-26-1 | 8-16 | 11th | |
| 2023 | Reynolds | 14-35 | 6-18 | 11th | |
| 2024 | Reynolds | 24-29 | 13-11 | 6th | A-10 Tournament First Round |
| 2025 | Reynolds | 14-34-1 | 7-23-0 | 12th | |
UMass (Mid-American Conference) (2026–present)
| Total: | | | | | |
National champion Postseason invitational champion Conference regular season champion Conference regular season and conference tournament champion Division regular season champion Division regular season and conference tournament champion Conference tournament champion

== UMass in the NCAA tournament ==
| Year | Coach | Record | Notes |
|---|---|---|---|
| 1954 | Earl E. Lorden | 3–2 | Eliminated by Missouri in the CWS. |
| 1955 | Earl E. Lorden | 1–1 | Eliminated by Springfield College in the District 1 playoffs. |
| 1956 | Earl E. Lorden | 0–1 | Eliminated by Vermont in the District 1 playoffs. |
| 1966 | Earl E. Lorden | 0–1 | Eliminated by Boston College in the District 1 playoffs. |
| 1967 | Dick Bergquist | 3–2 | Eliminated by Boston College in the District 1 playoffs. |
| 1969 | Dick Bergquist | 4–2 | Eliminated by Arizona State in the CWS. |
| 1971 | Dick Bergquist | 0–2 | Eliminated by Harvard in the District 1 playoffs. |
| 1973 | Dick Bergquist | 0–2 | Eliminated by Delaware in the District 1 playoffs. |
| 1978 | Dick Bergquist | 0–2 | Eliminated by Delaware in the Northeast Regional. |
| 1995 | Mike Stone | 0–2 | Eliminated by Texas A&M in the Atlantic II Regional. |
| 1996 | Mike Stone | 3–2 | Eliminated by Florida in the East Regional. |
| Totals | | 14–19 | 11 appearances |
The format of the tournament has changed through the years.

== Coaching history ==
| Tenure | Coach | Seasons | Record | Pct. |
|---|---|---|---|---|
| 1877–1903; 1905–1907 | No Coach | 35 | 89–138–1 | .393 |
| 1904 | Pat Bowler | 1 | 4–10 | .286 |
| 1908 | W. Breckenridge | 1 | 10–6 | .625 |
| 1911–1916 | William Fitzmaurice | 6 | 46–21–2 | .681 |
| 1920–1922 | Harold Gore | 3 | 10–20 | .333 |
| 1923 | Herbert Collins | 1 | 1–11 | .083 |
| 1924 | Emory Grayson | 1 | 5–7 | .417 |
| 1925–1931 | Lorin Ball | 7 | 35–57–2 | .383 |
| 1932–1935 | Mel Taube | 4 | 31–22 | .585 |
| 1936–1940 | Elbert Caraway | 5 | 40–29–2 | .577 |
| 1941–1942/1946-1947 | Fran Riel | 4 | 14–36 | .380 |
| 1945 | Thomas Eck | 1 | 1–6–1 | .193 |
| 1948–1966 | Earl Lorden | 19 | 187–147–3 | .567 |
| 1967–1987 | Dick Bergquist | 21 | 392–321–5 | .549 |
| 1988–2017 | Mike Stone | 30 | 697–695–3 | .501 |
| 2018–2025 | Matt Reynolds | 8 | 121-218-2 | .356 |
| 2026-present | Brandon Shileikis; Max Weir | 0 | 0-0 | .000 |

== UMass alumni in the MLB ==
- Doug Clark
- Gary DiSarcina
- Nick Gorneault
- Bob Hansen
- Lee King
- Greg LaRocca
- Mark Brown
- Ed Connolly
- Chick Davies
- Mike Flanagan
- Kenny Greer
- Ralph Lumenti
- Chad Paronto
- Jeff Reardon
- Steve Shea
- Joe Sherman
- Dave Telgheder
- Ron Villone

== Retired numbers ==
| No. | Player | Pos. | Tenure | No. ret. | Ref. |
|---|---|---|---|---|---|
| 26 | Dick Bergquist (Note: Bergquist holds the coaching record for the university (392–321–5).) | head coach | 1967–87 | 1991 | |

== See also ==
- List of NCAA Division I baseball programs
