= Dayton Flyers baseball =

Dayton Flyers
- 2026 Dayton Flyers baseball team
- Founded: 1902
- University: University of Dayton
- Head coach: Jayson King (1st season of 2nd stint, 8th overall season)
- Conference: A-10
- Location: Dayton, OH
- Home stadium: Woerner Field (capacity: 500)
- Nickname: Flyers, Flyboys
- Colors: Red and blue

NCAA tournament appearances
- 2012

Conference tournament champions
- 2012

Conference regular season champions
- 2009, 2012

The Dayton Flyers baseball team is a varsity intercollegiate athletic team of the University of Dayton in Dayton, Ohio, United States. The team is a member of the Atlantic 10 Conference, which is part of the National Collegiate Athletic Association's Division I. The team plays its home games at Woerner Field in Dayton, Ohio. The Flyers are coached by Jayson King.

== Dayton in the NCAA Tournament ==
Year	Record	Pct	Notes
2012	0–2	.000	College Station Regional
TOTALS	0–2	.000	

== Year-by-year results ==
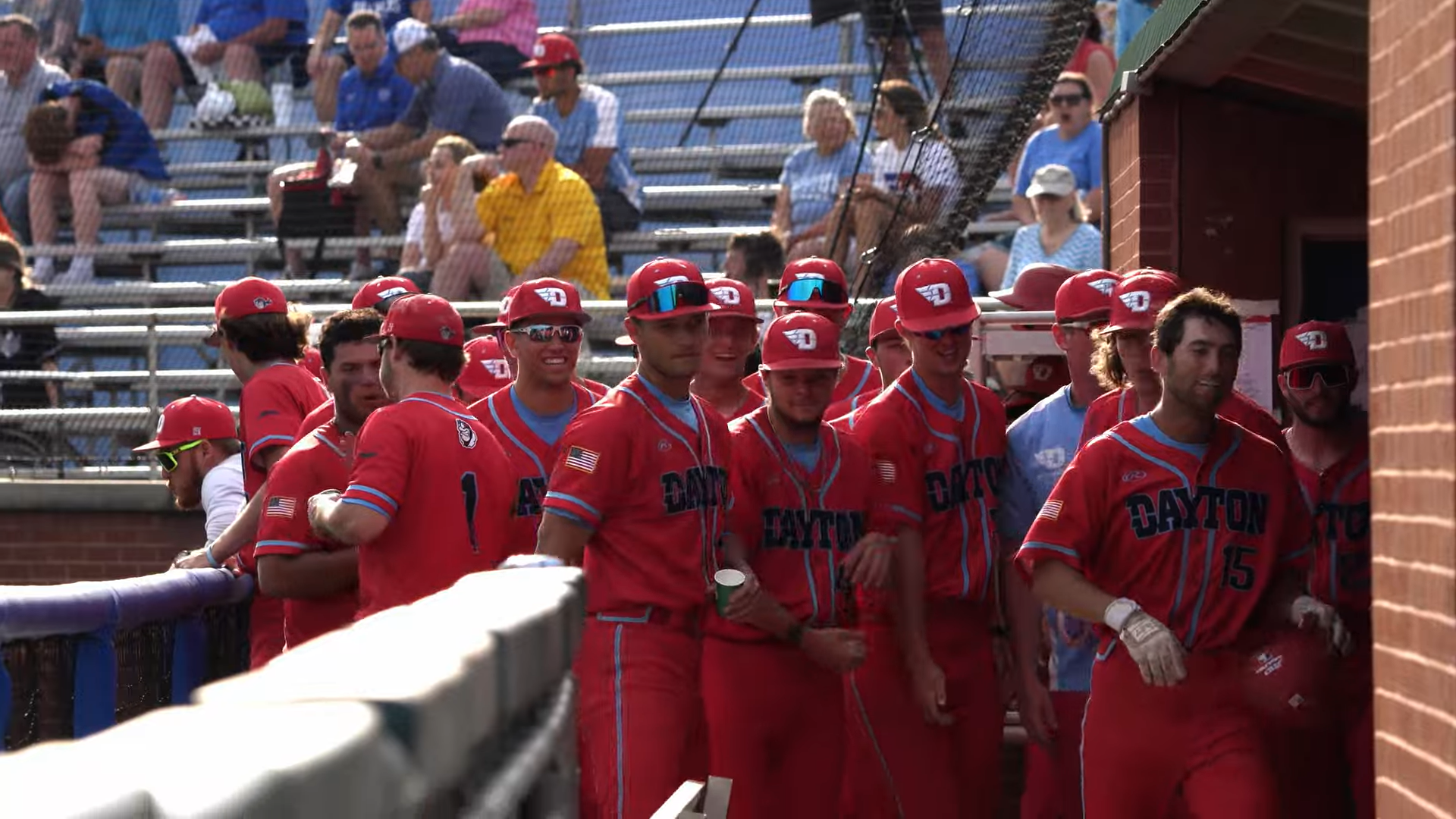
Flyers players in the dugout during a game in 2022

Below is a table of Dayton's yearly records as an NCAA Division I baseball program.

Record table
Season	Coach	Overall	Conference	Standing	Postseason
Independent (1986–1987)
1986	Tom Fries	16–25			
1987	Jim Murray	22–26			
Midwestern Collegiate Conference (1988–1993)
1988	Jim Murray	20–29	4–8	4th	
1989	Mark Schlemmer	14–40	4–18	4th	
1990	Mark Schlemmer	15–46	9–20	4th	
1991	Mark Schlemmer	21–38	4–20	7th	
1992	Mark Schlemmer	25–31	9–11	3rd	
1993	Chris Sorrell	22–39	10–18	6th	
Great Midwest Conference (1994–1995)
1994	Chris Sorrell	19–34	7–15	4th	
1995	Chris Sorrell	11–44	5–18	5th	
Atlantic 10 Conference (1996–present)
1996	Chris Sorrell	25–29	8–11	4th	
1997	Chris Sorrell	21–28	12–9	3rd	
1998	Chris Sorrell	21–19	5–12	5th	
1999	Chris Sorrell	22–34	8–13	6th	
2000	Tony Vittorio	23–32	10–11	4th	
2001	Tony Vittorio	32–26	15–7	2nd	Atlantic 10 tournament
2002	Tony Vittorio	32–21	14–10	4th	Atlantic 10 tournament
2003	Tony Vittorio	16–36	4–20	6th	
2004	Tony Vittorio	25–28	11–13	4th	
2005	Tony Vittorio	36–23	16–8	2nd	Atlantic 10 tournament
2006	Tony Vittorio	33–24	18–9	3rd	Atlantic 10 tournament
2007	Tony Vittorio	21–33	9–18	11th	
2008	Tony Vittorio	31–25	13–14	7th	
2009	Tony Vittorio	38–19	21–6	1st	Atlantic 10 tournament
2010	Tony Vittorio	23–32	12–15	10th	
2011	Tony Vittorio	32–27	15–9	3rd	Atlantic 10 tournament
2012	Tony Vittorio	31–30	17–7	2nd	NCAA Regional
2013	Tony Vittorio	11–39	3–21	15th	
2014	Tony Vittorio	24–30	14–13	6th	Atlantic 10 tournament
2015	Tony Vittorio	16–38	5–19	12th	
Atlantic 10:		513–583	230–245		
Total:		698–935			
National champion Postseason invitational champion Conference regular season champion Conference regular season and conference tournament champion Division regular season champion Division regular season and conference tournament champion Conference tournament champion

== Major League Baseball ==
Dayton has had 15 Major League Baseball draft selections since the draft began in 1965. Three of them (Jerry Blevins, Mike Hauschild, and Craig Stammen) have reached the Major Leagues.

Flyers in the Major League Baseball draft
Year	Player	Round	Team
1969	Alan Schmidt	26	Astros
1986	Damon Brooks	28	Astros
1991	Tony Miller	13	Astros
1998	Ryan Fleming	18	Blue Jays
1999	Jason Siegfried	36	Tigers
2001	Samuel Fisher	49	Cardinals
2002	Mark Wahl	48	Orioles
2002	Sam Fischer	22	Astros
2004	Jerry Blevins	17	Cubs
2005	Craig Stammen	12	Nationals
2006	Luke Trubee	33	Yankees
2010	Cole Tyrell	42	Padres
2010	Cam Hobson	37	Yankees
2011	Cam Hobson	11	Mariners
2012	Mike Hauschild	33	Astros
2021	Riley Tirotta	28	Blue Jays
2023	Mark Manfredi	9	Brewers

== See also ==
- List of NCAA Division I baseball programs
