= Fordham Rams baseball =

American college baseball team

- 2026 Fordham Rams baseball team
- Founded: 1860; 166 years ago
- University: Fordham University
- Head coach: Kevin Leighton (15th season)
- Conference: Atlantic 10
- Location: The Bronx, New York
- Home stadium: Jim Houlihan Park at Jack Coffey Field (capacity: 1,000)
- Nickname: Rams
- Colors: Maroon and white

NCAA tournament appearances
- 1987, 1988, 1990, 1993, 1998, 2019

Conference tournament champions
- Patriot League: 1993; Atlantic 10: 1998, 2019

Conference regular season champions
- MAAC: 1987, 1988, 1990; Patriot League: 1991, 1992

The Fordham Rams baseball is the team that represents Fordham University in New York City as it has been in existence since its first game played against the now-defunct St. Francis Xavier College in Manhattan, the first collegiate baseball game played with nine-man teams as is the case to this very today.

The team's 4,541 wins at the conclusion of the 2021 season are the most of any NCAA Division I baseball team. The Rams have reached six NCAA Tournaments in school history, most recently in 2019.

== History ==
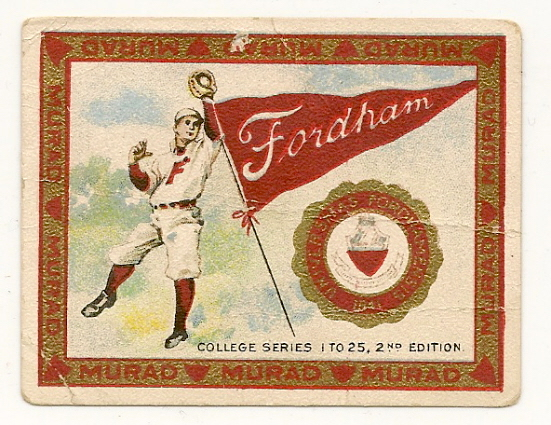
Tobacco card circa 1910

Founded in the late 1850s, the Fordham Rose Hill Baseball Club of St. John's College (the precursor to Fordham University, and of no connection at all to St. John's University) played against St. Francis Xavier College in the first ever college baseball game under modern nine-man-team rules (Knickerbocker Rules, or "The New York Game") on November 3, 1859.

There have been 56 major leaguers who have played for Fordham, including All-Star pitcher Pete Harnisch and Baseball Hall of Famer Frankie Frisch. Frisch, a star athlete in four different sports at Fordham, was known as the "Fordham Flash". Steve Bellán, a Cuban who attended what was then St. John's College from 1863 to 1868, played in the major leagues, primarily as a third baseman, and was the first Latin American in professional baseball. Gil McDougald, who played for the New York Yankees, was a coach on the team. Announcer Vin Scully, who played outfield at Fordham before achieving greater fame in the broadcast booth, hit one home run in his Fordham career, which included a game against George H. W. Bush who was playing for Yale University at the time. Fordham's most recent Hall of Fame inductee class in 2012 included a member of the baseball team, Bob Cole.

In honor of the 150th anniversary of the team's first game, Fordham played Williams College, which was also celebrating its sesquicentennial of baseball play. University President Joseph M. McShane, who had conceived of the anniversary game, threw out the ceremonial first pitch for that game. Williams had lost to Amherst College on July 1, 1859 and considered the first college baseball game under the now defunct Massachusetts rules, losing 73-32.

== Fordham in the NCAA Tournament ==
Year	Record	Pct	Notes
1987	2–2	.500	Northeast Regional
1988	0–2	.000	Northeast Regional
1990	1–2	.333	Midwest Regional
1993	1–2	.333	Midwest Regional
1998	0–2	.000	East Regional
2019	0–2	.000	Morgantown Regional
TOTALS	4–12	.250	

== Home field ==
The team plays home games at Jim Houlihan Park at Jack Coffey Field. Jack Coffey Field, a multisport facility, is named after Jack Coffey, former athletic director and baseball coach at the university. He amassed 817 wins as a baseball coach. Coffey is the only player to play with both Ty Cobb and Babe Ruth in the same season (1918 Detroit Tigers and Boston Red Sox). The baseball portion of the field was renamed "Houlihan Park" after renovations completed in 2005.

== See also ==
- List of NCAA Division I baseball programs
