= Duquesne Dukes =

Intercollegiate sports teams of Duquesne University

- University: Duquesne University
- Nickname: Dukes
- NCAA: Division I (FCS)
- Conference: Atlantic 10 Conference (primary); Northeast Conference (football, women’s bowling); NCATA (acrobatics and tumbling); USA Triathlon (triathlon)
- Athletic director: John Henderson (interim)
- Location: Pittsburgh, Pennsylvania
- Varsity teams: 17
- Football stadium: Arthur J. Rooney Athletic Field
- Basketball arena: UPMC Cooper Fieldhouse
- Colors: Red and blue
- Mascot: The Duke
- Fight song: "The Victory Song (Red and Blue)"
- Website: goduquesne.com
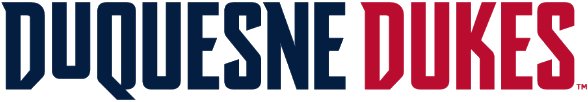

The Duquesne Dukes are the athletic teams of Duquesne University of Pittsburgh, Pennsylvania. The Dukes compete in Division I of the National Collegiate Athletic Association as members of the Atlantic 10 Conference. Football and bowling, however, compete in the Northeast Conference.

== Sports sponsored ==
Men's sports	Women's sports
Basketball	Basketball
Cross country	Cross country
Soccer	Soccer
Tennis	Tennis
Track and field	Track and field^{1}
Football	Bowling
	Rowing
	Acrobatics & Tumbling
	Swimming and diving
	Golf
	Triathlon
	Lacrosse
	Volleyball
^{1} – includes both indoor and outdoor

A member of the Atlantic 10 Conference, Duquesne University sponsors teams in six men's and eleven women's NCAA sanctioned sports. The football and bowling teams compete as associate members of the Northeast Conference.

=== Basketball ===
The Dukes men's basketball team has had great success over the years, playing twice in national championship games in the 1950s and winning the National Invitation Tournament championship in 1955. The men's basketball Dukes semi-regularly play their cross-town rival, the University of Pittsburgh Panthers, in Pittsburgh's well-attended City Game.

The Dukes women's basketball team annually plays the University of Pittsburgh every year in the women's version of the City Game.

==== Fictional portrayals ====
A Duquesne Dukes men's basketball player's heart ailment serves as the major plot device for the pilot episode of Pittsburgh-based CBS medical drama Three Rivers.

=== Football ===
Duquesne has played football as a club team from 1891 to 1894, 1896 to 1903, 1913 to 1914, and 1920 to 1928, in the NCAA Division I Football Bowl Subdivision (FBS) from 1929 to 1942 and 1947 to 1950, again as a club team from 1969 to 1978, in NCAA Division III from 1979 to 1992, and in the NCAA Division I Football Championship Subdivision (FCS) from 1993–present. The Dukes have won or shared 18 conference championships in the past 30 years.

=== Other varsity sports ===
Duquesne's wrestling squad was a relatively successful NCAA Division I team that competed as an Independent. The Dukes wrestlers won two NCAA Division I East Regional Championships (2000 and 2005) and sent at least one wrestler to the NCAA Championships every year during John Hartupee's 11 seasons as head coach. The wrestling program eventually disbanded for a variety of reasons.

Duquesne fielded an NCAA varsity rifle team for many years (a coed sport). This team competed in the Middle Atlantic Rifle Conference, claiming a share of the conference title in the 2001–02 season. The team officially disbanded after the 2003–04 season.

In the fall 2012 semester, Duquesne's women's rowing team, for the first time, took first place in the varsity eight event at the Head of the Ohio, held in Pittsburgh.

== Atlantic 10 Championships ==
Atlantic 10 Conference logo in Duquesne's colors

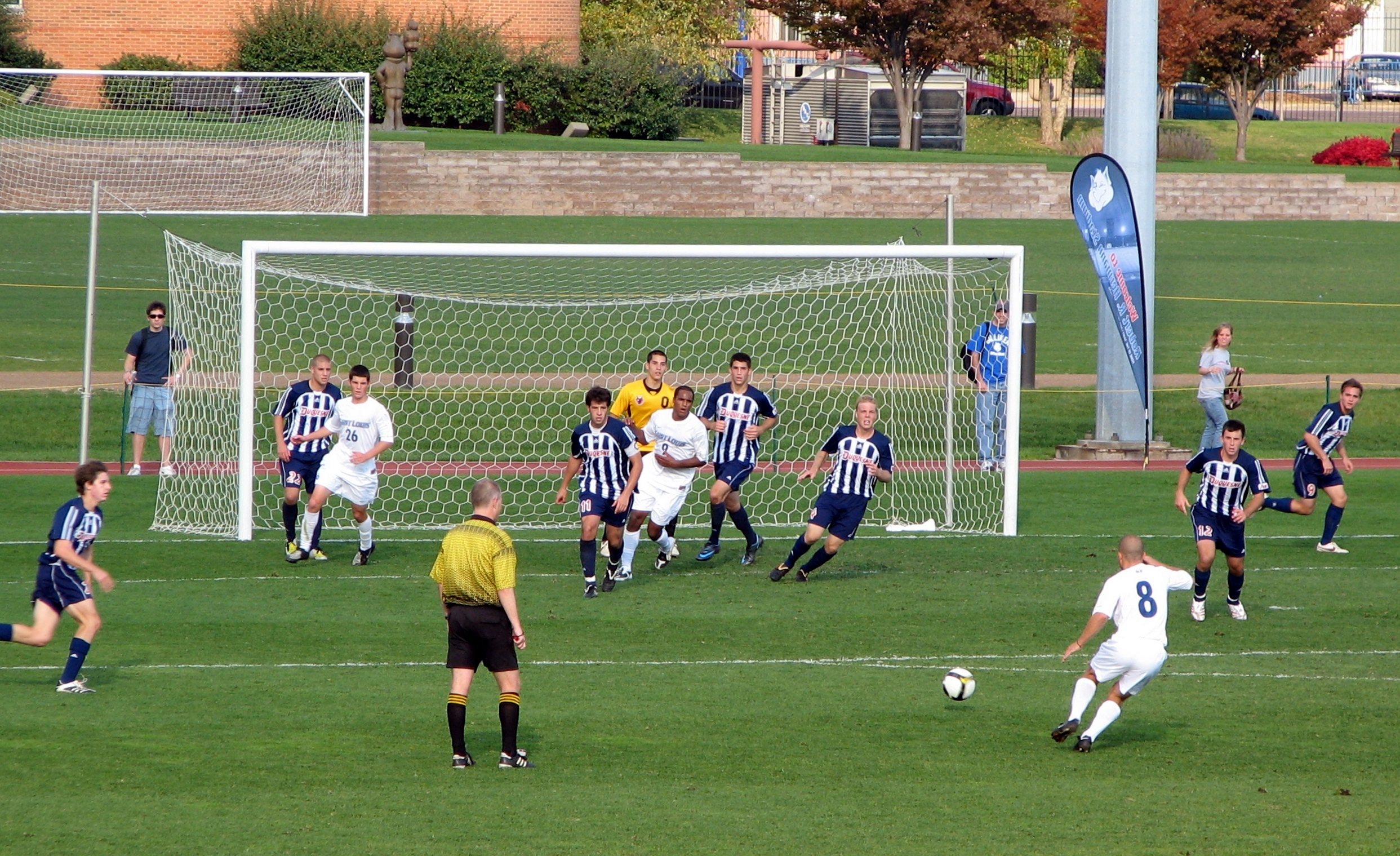
Duquesne (in white) v St. Louis soccer match in 2008

Duquesne's first postseason/"full" Atlantic 10 team championship came in 1977 with a men's title in the Eastern Collegiate Basketball League (the forerunner to the Eastern Athletic Association, now known as the Atlantic 10 Conference). The Dukes also won the 2024 Atlantic 10 men's basketball championship and have won Atlantic 10 team championships in men's cross country (2005), women's cross country (2013, 2014 and 2020–21), women's volleyball (2013), women's soccer (2015) and women's swimming & diving (2018 and 2019). In addition, Duquesne has won numerous regular-season Atlantic 10 team championships. Men's basketball was co-champion of the league's regular seasons in 1980 and 1981 when it was known as the Eastern Athletic Association. Women's basketball was co-champion of the league's regular season in 2016.

Men's soccer was champion of the league's regular seasons in 2003 (co-), 2004, 2005 (co-) and 2026. Women's lacrosse was co-champion of the league's regular seasons in 2004 and 2005, and women's volleyball won an Atlantic 10 regular-season title in 2013.

The Dukes have also crowned postseason/"full" Atlantic 10 individual champions in men's cross country (2), women's rowing (8), swimming & diving [23 (men), 47 (women)], women’s indoor track & field (30), and outdoor track & field [30 (men), 33 (women)].

=== Postseason/"Full" (184) ===
==== Team (10) ====
Men's Basketball (2)

- 1977 (Eastern Collegiate Basketball League — the forerunner to the Eastern Athletic Association — now known as the Atlantic 10 Conference)
- 2024

Men's Cross Country (1)

- 2005

Women's Cross Country (3)

- 2013
- 2014
- 2020–21 (spring championship due to COVID-19 pandemic)

Women's Volleyball (1)

- 2013

Women's Soccer (1)

- 2015

Women's Swimming & Diving (2)

- 2018
- 2019

==== Individual (174) ====
Men's Cross Country (2)

- Tom Slosky – 2007
- Rico Galassi – 2016

Women's Rowing (8)

- Novice 4 – 1999
- Novice 4 – 2007
- Lightweight 4 – 2007
- Lightweight 8 – 2008
- Lightweight 8 – 2009
- Quad – 2012
- Novice 4 – 2013
- Novice 8 – 2013

Men's Swimming & Diving (23)

- 100-yard Freestyle – Edwin Wicker – 2003
- 100-yard Backstroke – Scott Darwin – 2005
- 200-yard Backstroke – Scott Darwin – 2005
- 50-yard Freestyle – Scott Darwin – 2006
- 100-yard Freestyle – Edwin Wicker – 2006
- 200-yard Freestyle Relay – Edwin Wicker, Ian Walsh, Mike Ley and Scott Darwin – 2006
- 50-yard Freestyle – Edwin Wicker – 2007
- 200-yard Freestyle Relay – Eric Bugby, Scott Darwin, Mike Ley and Edwin Wicker – 2007
- 100-yard Butterfly – Eric Bugby – 2007
- 400-yard Freestyle Relay – Eric Bugby, Scott Darwin, Ian Walsh and Edwin Wicker – 2007
- 800-yard Freestyle Relay – Jim O'Hara, Brendan Schilling, Ian Walsh and Edward LeBlanc – 2008
- 500-yard Freestyle – Edward LeBlanc – 2008
- 200-yard Freestyle Relay – Brendan Schilling, Jim O'Hara, Rich Ryan and Edward LeBlanc – 2008
- 200-yard Freestyle – Edward LeBlanc – 2008
- 400-yard Freestyle Relay – Jim O'Hara, Brendan Schilling, Ian Walsh and Edward LeBlanc – 2008
- 200-yard Freestyle – Edward LeBlanc – 2009
- 100-yard Breaststroke – Ian Walsh – 2009
- 800-yard Freestyle Relay – Jim O'Hara, Chris Kobela, Roman Becicka, Edward LeBlanc – 2010
- 500-yard Freestyle – Edward LeBlanc – 2010
- 200-yard Freestyle Relay – Brendan Schilling, Edward LeBlanc, Roman Becicka, Jim O'Hara – 2010
- 200-yard Freestyle – Edward LeBlanc – 2010
- 100-yard Freestyle – Edward LeBlanc – 2010
- 400-yard Freestyle Relay – Brendan Schilling, Jim O'Hara, Roman Becicka, Edward LeBlanc – 2010

Women's Swimming & Diving (48)

- 50-yard Freestyle – Katrina Streiner – 2006
- 200-yard Backstroke – Kyla Favret – 2006
- 100-yard Freestyle – Melissa Johnson – 2007
- 1,650-yard Freestyle – Liz Yager – 2007
- 200-yard Freestyle Relay – Melissa Johnson, Lauren Stephens, Christina Sherrard and Katrina Streiner – 2008
- 200-yard Freestyle – Melissa Johnson – 2008
- 200-yard Backstroke – Kyla Favret – 2008
- 100-yard Freestyle – Melissa Johnson – 2008
- 50-yard Freestyle – Christina Sherrard – 2009
- 100-yard Freestyle – Christina Sherrard – 2009
- 400-yard Individual Medley – Miriam McGeath – 2011
- 400-yard Individual Medley – Meghan Smith – 2013
- 400-yard Individual Medley – Miriam McGeath – 2014
- 400-yard Individual Medley – Lexi Santer – 2015
- 100-yard Backstroke – Abby Watson – 2015
- 200-yard Freestyle Relay – Sam Ray, Kristen McKnight, Claire Nobles and Gabrielle Sibilia – 2016
- 200-yard Backstroke – Lexi Santer – 2016
- 100-yard Freestyle – Samantha Ray – 2016
- 200-yard Medley Relay – Abby Watson, Kayla Owens, Kristen McKnight and Michelle Heim – 2017
- 200-yard Medley Relay – Abby Watson, Abigail Stauffer, Kristen McKnight and Michelle Heim – 2018
- 200-yard Individual Medley – Emma Brinton – 2018
- 500-yard Freestyle – Lauren Devorace – 2018
- 400-yard Individual Medley – Emma Brinton – 2018
- 200-yard Breaststroke – Abigail Stauffer – 2019
- 400-yard Individual Medley – Emma Brinton – 2019
- 400-yard Medley Relay – Emma Brinton, Abigail Stauffer, Audrey Steen and Hanna Everhart – 2019
- 200-yard Individual Medley – Emma Brinton – 2019
- 800-yard Freestyle Relay – Emma Brinton, Hanna Everhart, Lauren Devorace and Carson Gross – 2019
- 800-yard Freestyle Relay – Emma Brinton, Carson Gross, Lauren Devorace and Hanna Everhart – 2020
- 100-yard Freestyle – Hanna Everhart – 2020
- 200-yard Freestyle – Hanna Everhart – 2020
- 200-yard Individual Medley – Emma Brinton – 2021
- 400-yard Individual Medley – Emma Brinton – 2021
- 200-yard Freestyle – Hanna Everhart – 2021
- 100-yard Backstroke – Audrey Steen – 2021
- 400-yard Medley Relay – Reagan Linkous, Madison Dickert, Audrey Steen and Hanna Everhart – 2021
- 800-yard Freestyle Relay – Mendy De Rooi, Hayley Taylor, Emma Menzer and Hanna Everhart – 2022
- 200-yard Freestyle – Hanna Everhart – 2022
- 100-yard Freestyle – Mendy De Rooi – 2022
- 1-meter Diving – Amy Read – 2023
- 200-yard Backstroke – Haley Scholer – 2024
- 100-yard Butterly – Ashley Freel – 2025
- 200-yard Freestyle – Orla Egan – 2025
- 200-yard Backstroke – Haley Scholer – 2025
- 800-yard Freestyle Relay – Sierra Snow, Lexi Sundgren, Kaitlyn Connors and Ashley Freel – 2026
- 500-yard Freestyle – Sierra Snow – 2026
- 100-yard Butterfly – Ashley Freel – 2026
- 200-yard Backstroke – Sierra Snow – 2026

Women's Indoor Track & Field (30)

- Triple Jump – Shea McMillan – 2002
- 4,000-meter Distance Medley Relay – Michelle Flynn, Julie Tyo, Alison Buchanan and Carrie Hucko – 2003
- 1,000-meter Run – Tara Gerlach – 2004
- 3,200-meter Relay – Tara Gerlach, Elizabeth Graham, Alison Buchanan and Michelle Flynn – 2004
- 4,000-meter Distance Medley Relay – Tara Gerlach, Emily Beahan, Ashley Earnest and Amy Ruffolo – 2006
- 1,000-meter Run – Emily Beahan – 2007
- 4,000-meter Distance Medley Relay – Amy Ruffolo, Ashley Earnest, Emily Beahan and Samantha Howard – 2007
- Pole Vault – Daniela Siciliano – 2007
- 200-meter Dash – Melissa Miller – 2010
- 400-meter Dash – Melissa Miller – 2010
- 500-meter Run – Taylor Glenn – 2011
- Shot Put – Ashley Adams – 2011
- High Jump – Sherie Key – 2013
- 500-meter Run – Anna Simone – 2014
- 800-meter Run – Elise Farris – 2014
- 1,000-meter Run – Haley Pisarcik – 2014
- Pentathlon – Louise Prevoteau – 2014
- 3,200-meter Relay – Haley Pisarcik, Shelby Haitz, Amber Valimont and Elise Farris – 2014
- 4,000-meter Distance Medley Relay – Haley Pisarcik, Shannon Abraham, Elise Farris and Amber Valimont – 2014
- 500-meter Run – Anna Simone – 2015
- Pentathlon – Louise Prevoteau – 2015
- 200-meter Dash – Bethany Evankovich – 2018
- 500-meter Run – Bethany Evankovich – 2018
- 400-meter Run – Bethany Evankovich – 2020
- 1,600-meter Relay – Gabby Holmberg, Kel-Lisa Sebwe, Maiah Yankello and Bethany Evankovich – 2020
- 500-meter Run – Hannah Seitzinger – 2022
- Pentathlon – Emily Brozeski – 2023
- 500-meter Run – Hannah Seitzinger – 2023
- Pentathlon – Jamelah Carswell – 2024
- 500-meter Run – Hannah Seitzinger – 2024

Men's Outdoor Track & Field (30)

- Long Jump – Leigh Bodden^ – 2002
- 10,000-meter Run – Ryan Bender – 2004
- High Jump – Mike Murawski – 2005
- Hammer Throw – Chuck Mohan – 2005
- Discus Throw – Chuck Mohan – 2005
- 3,000-meter Steeplechase – Tom Slosky – 2005
- 3,000-meter Steeplechase – Tom Slosky – 2006
- Discus Throw – Robert Healy III^ – 2006
- 3,000-meter Steeplechase – Derek Dutille – 2007
- 10,000-meter Run – Josh Eddy – 2007
- 3,000-meter Steeplechase – Tom Slosky – 2008
- 100-meter Dash – Shakiel Carter – 2014
- 5,000-meter Run – Jim Spisak – 2014
- 10,000-meter Run – Jim Spisak – 2014
- Long Jump – Ian Welch – 2014
- Long Jump – Ian Welch – 2015
- 3,000-meter Steeplechase – Evan Gomez – 2015
- 400-meter Relay – Andrew George, Robert Norman, David O'Such and Isaac Elliott – 2018
- 100-meter Dash – Isaac Elliott – 2019
- 200-meter Dash – Isaac Elliott – 2019
- 3,000-meter Steeplechase – Casey Conboy – 2021
- 100-meter Dash – Isaac Elliott – 2021
- 200-meter Dash – Isaac Elliott – 2021
- 800-meter Run – Matt Busche – 2021
- 100-meter Dash – Isaac Elliott – 2022
- 200-meter Dash – Isaac Elliott – 2022
- 800-meter Run – Collin Ebling – 2022
- Triple Jump – Logan Williamson – 2022
- 400-meter Relay – Ryan Marcella, David Williams, Ian Thrush and Isaac Elliott – 2022
- Decathlon - Christian Cupp - 2026

^ Bodden and Healy are the only athletes in school history to have won a MAAC/NEC football title (team) and an Atlantic 10 title of any kind (team or individual). They are also believed to be the only athletes in school history to have won conference championships in multiple sports (excluding cross country and track & field combinations) or even to have been first-team all-conference in multiple sports (again, excluding XC-TF combos).

Women's Outdoor Track & Field (33)

- 100-meter Hurdles – Nicole Wiley – 2001
- 400-meter Hurdles – Kathleen McCabe – 2002
- Triple Jump – Shea McMillan – 2002
- Discus Throw – Melissa Stewart – 2003
- Pole Vault – Sarah Fetterman – 2004
- Pole Vault – Sarah Fetterman – 2005
- 3,000-meter Steeplechase – Amy Ruffolo – 2005
- 400-meter Hurdles – Kristen Micsky – 2005
- Long Jump – Kristen Micsky – 2005
- Triple Jump – Kristen Micsky – 2005
- Discus Throw – Ashley Adams – 2010
- 200-meter Dash – Taylor Glenn – 2011
- 400-meter Hurdles – Nicole Cherok – 2012
- 400-meter Hurdles – Nicole Cherok – 2103
- 3,000-meter Steeplechase – Amber Valimont – 2013
- Long Jump – Brittney Edwards – 2013
- 400-meter Hurdles – Anna Simone – 2014
- High Jump – Sherie Key – 2014
- Heptathlon – Louise Prevoteau – 2014
- 3,000-meter Steeplechase – Danica Snyder – 2015
- 400-meter Hurdles – Anna Simone – 2105
- Javelin Throw – Julia Franzosa – 2016
- 3,000-meter Steeplechase – Valerie Palermo – 2016
- 3,000-meter Steeplechase – Valerie Palermo – 2017
- Heptathlon – Emily Brozeski – 2022
- Heptathlon – Emily Brozeski – 2023
- Heptathlon – Emily Brozeski – 2024
- Shot Put – Madelyn Moretti – 2024
- 3,200-meter Relay – Liv Wilson, Angela Valotta, Haley Hamilton and Hannah Seitzinger – 2024
- Heptathlon – Halle Walcutt – 2025
- 100-meter Hurdles - Anna Rorrer - 2026
- 400-meter Hurdles - Anna Rorrer - 2026
- Triple Jump - Rose Kuchera - 2026

=== Regular season (9) ===
==== Team (9) ====
Men's Basketball (2)

- 1980 – co-champions – Eastern Athletic Association
- 1981 – co-champions – Eastern Athletic Association

Women's Basketball (1)

- 2016 – Co-Champions

Men's Soccer (3)

- 2003 – Co-Champions
- 2004
- 2005 – Co-Champions

Women's Lacrosse (2)

- 2004 – Co-Champions
- 2005 – Co-Champions

Women's Volleyball (1)

- 2013

== MAAC and NEC Football Conference Championships ==
Year	Overall record	Conference record
1995	10–1	7–0 MAAC
1996	10-1	8–0 MAAC
1999	8–3	7–1 MAAC
2000	10–1	7–0 MAAC
2001	8–3	6–0 MAAC
2002	11–1	8–0 MAAC
2003	8–3	5–0 MAAC
2004	7–3	4–0 MAAC
2005	7–3	4–0 MAAC
2006	7–3	3–1 MAAC (Note: co-championship.)
2007	6–4	2–1 MAAC
2011	9–2	7–1 NEC
2013	7–4	4–2 NEC
2015	8–4	5–1 NEC
2016	8–3	5–1 NEC
2018	9–4	5–1 NEC
2023	7–5	6–1 NEC
2024	8–3	5–1 NEC
18 Total conference championships

== Club sports ==
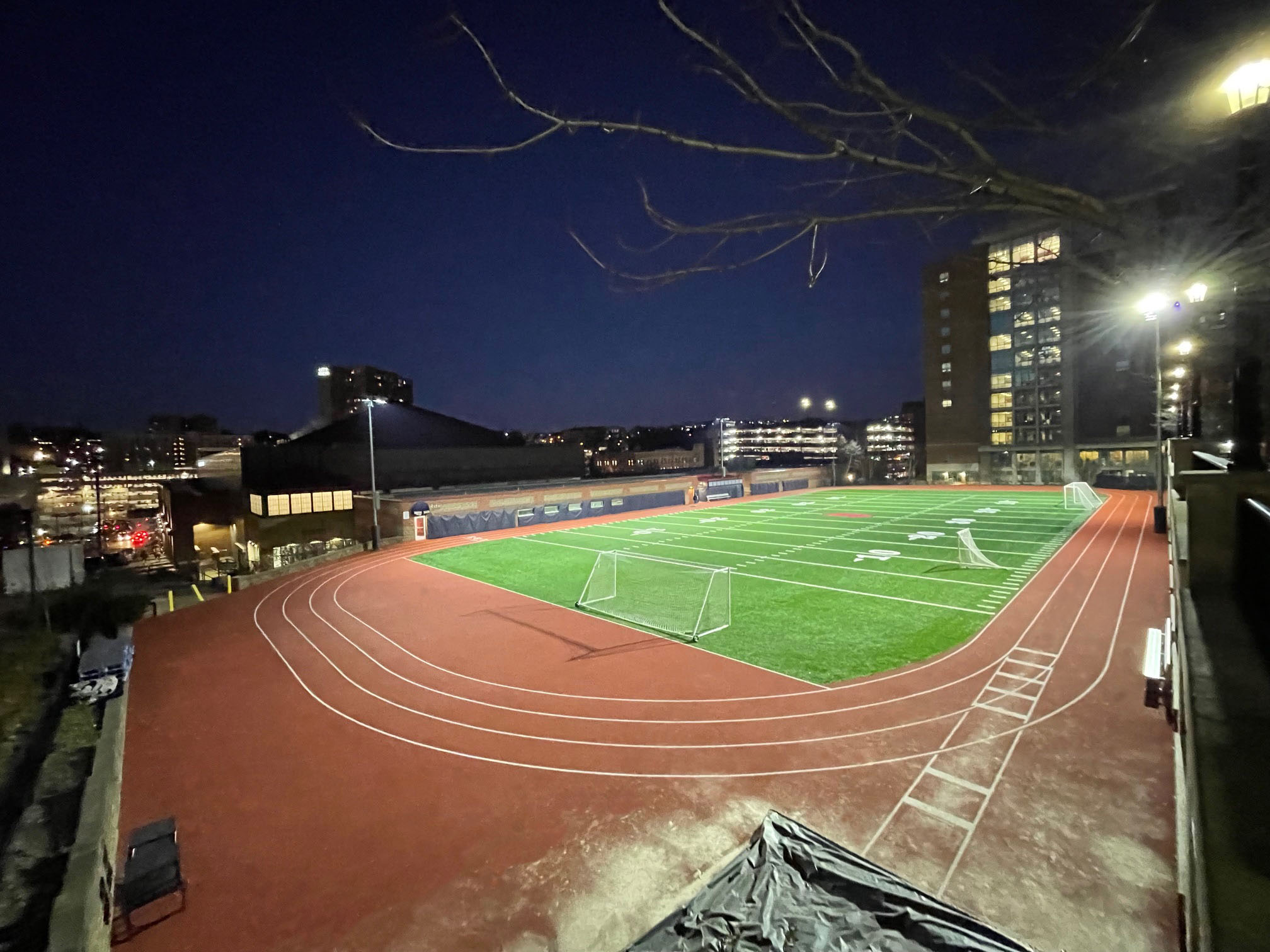
McCloskey Field at Duquesne's downtown Pittsburgh campus is surrounded by a 3-lane running track installed by ATT Sports, Inc

Duquesne fields many club, or non-varsity, teams that compete regularly against other schools. Club sports offered at Duquesne are men's ice hockey, indoor track & field, tennis, lacrosse and roller hockey.

The men's ice hockey team is affiliated with the Division I level of the American Collegiate Hockey Association, competing in the College Hockey Mid-America conference. The team was CHMA champions during the 2006–07 and 2008–09 seasons. They participated in the national ACHA tournament in 2004–05, 2005–06 and 2008–09, finishing eighth in the country in 2006. Duquesne will field a Division III team for the 2021-22 season, joining College Hockey East.

The men's indoor track & field program practices and competes alongside Duquesne's varsity women's indoor track & field program during the winter months and is affiliated with the Intercollegiate Association of Amateur Athletes of America. The men's team is recognized as varsity during the spring months when it becomes an outdoor track & field program and competes in the Atlantic 10, though it maintains its affiliation with the IC4A.

The Duquesne club tennis team is a part of the United States Tennis Association's Tennis on Campus program.

== Mascot ==
The "Dukes" nickname dates back to 1911, when what is now Duquesne University changed its name to honor the Marquis Du Quesne, the French governor of Canada, who first brought Catholic observances to the Pittsburgh area.

Since a Marquis and a Duke are not visually distinct (and the name "Duquesne" implies a "Duke"), the unofficial symbol of the school's athletic teams became a man dressed in a top hat, tails and a regal sash across his chest. "Dukes" being more readily recognized than "Marquis," the name Duke was popularly assigned to the symbol and stuck ever since the fall of 1911.

The Duquesne Department of Athletics unveiled its most notable "Duke" mascot prior to the January 18, 2003 game against the University of Richmond. The Duke is 7-feet tall with an oversized head and sports a dapper navy blue suit with red piping, a red shirt with a red bow tie, and red gloves, with a black top hat. The new Duke replaces "Duke the Bear" who was a fixture at DU athletic events since 1996.

At the December 13, 2008 game versus West Virginia, Duquesne introduced its new human-figure mascot to replace the 7-foot-tall (2.1 m) character mascot. The mascot traditionally sports its black jacket with coat-tails and overbearing top-hat.

Before the 2010 City Game vs the Pittsburgh Panthers, Duquesne introduced the new character mascot at an annual alumni event.

On January 13, 2021, Duquesne Athletics revealed a new representation of the Duke on social media. The new logo, stylized similarly to the Duquesne “D” athletics logo is a geometric lion’s head wearing a top hat. The lion insignia is present in the seal of Duquesne University and is a new direction and interpretation of the Duke itself.

Duquesne's school colors of red and blue, the colors of the Holy Ghost Fathers, have been in place since the school's inception.

== University fight song ==
The Victory Song (Red and Blue) was written in 1926. Words and music were composed by Father Thomas J. Quigley (class of 1927).
