= George Washington Revolutionaries baseball =

Varsity intercollegiate athletic team of George Washington University

George Washington Revolutionaries
- 2026 George Washington Colonials baseball team
- Founded: 1891
- University: George Washington University
- Head coach: Gregg Ritchie (14th season)
- Conference: A-10
- Location: Arlington, VA
- Home stadium: Tucker Field at Barcroft Park (capacity: 1,000)
- Nickname: Revolutionaries
- Colors: Buff and blue

NCAA tournament appearances
- 1979, 1989, 1992, 2002

Conference tournament champions
- 1979, 1989, 1992, 2002

The George Washington Revolutionaries baseball team is a varsity intercollegiate athletic team of George Washington University in Washington, DC, United States. The team is a member of the Atlantic 10 Conference, which is part of the National Collegiate Athletic Association's Division I. George Washington's first baseball team was fielded in 1891. The team plays its home games at Barcroft Park in Arlington, Virginia. The Colonials are coached by Gregg Ritchie.

== History ==
The George Washington University has won eight total conference championships since sponsoring a program. The program has had 43 players drafted since its inception.

Barcroft Park in Arlington, Va., has been the home of GW baseball since the team relocated off The Ellipse in 1993. The facility underwent a multimillion-dollar renovation in 2012 to install a new press box, concession area, dugouts, bullpens and stadium seating.

In 2014, Ave Tucker, an alumnus and former center fielder, donated $2 million. The name of the facility was officially changed to Tucker Field in his honor. He graduated in 1977 from the George Washington University School of Business.

== NCAA Tournament ==
George Washington reached the NCAA Division I baseball tournament. They have a record of 1–8.

Year	Region	Opponent	Result
1979	East Regional	Arkansas; Seton Hall; Florida	L 11–12; W 5–2; L 7–12
1989	Northeast Regional	Arizona State; Arkansas	L 0–5; L 2–8
1992	Midwest Regional	Wichita State; Minnesota	L 0–9; L 3–19
2002	Winston-Salem Regional	Wake Forest; Navy	L 6–12; L 4–6

== All-time Coaching Records ==
The Colonials have had 12 coaches since 1950 when proper records were kept. The coach with the most all-time wins is Tom Walter with 275.

Name	Years	Wins	Losses	Ties	Win Pct.	Conference Wins	Conference Losses	Conference Ties	Conference Win Pct.
Christian Zidouemba	2017-Present	25	23	2	.500				
Will Smith	1972–73, 75	48	45	0	.516				
Mike Toomey	1976–80	102	82	0	.554				
Dennis Brant	1981–82	34	41	0	.453	4	4	0	.500
Jim Goss	1983–84	42	52	1	.442	13	10	0	.565
John Castleberry	1985–91	185	158	5	.532	71	31	0	.696
Jay Murphy	1992–96	116	134	1	.462	61	42	0	.592
Tom Walter	1997–04	275	184	0	.599	109	60	0	.645
Steve Mrowka	2005–12	202	245	1	.451	94	109	0	.463
Gregg Ritchie	2013–present	303	310	0	.494	138	128	0	.519
Total		1,580	1,465	12	.519	490	384	.561	

== Year-by-year Home Results ==
The following is the home record of the Colonials since they relocated to Tucker Field.

Year	Wins	Losses	Ties	Win Pct.
1993	6	7		.462
1994	12	8		.667
1995	13	7		.650
1996	16	11		.593
1997	12	10		.545
1998	21	5		.808
1999	14	9		.609
2000	21	7		.750
2001	21	7		.750
2002	21	9		.700
2003	19	3		.864
2004	22	5		.815
2005	23	9		.719
2006	9	13		.409
2007	12	11	1	.522
2008	12	15		.444
2009	16	17		.485
2010	10	11		.476
2011	11	17		.393
2012	11	17		.393
2013	15	16		.484
2014	14	16		.467
2015	20	10		.667
2016	15	11		.577
2017	15	10		.600
2018	22	10		.688
2019	21	11		.656
2020	7	4		.636
Total	431	286	1	.601

== See also ==
- List of NCAA Division I baseball programs
