= Saint Joseph's Hawks baseball =

Varsity intercollegiate athletic team of Saint Joseph's University

- 2026 Saint Joseph's Hawks baseball team
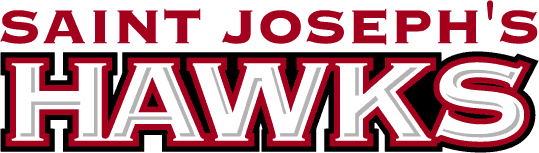
- Founded: 1894
- University: Saint Joseph's University
- Head coach: Fritz Hamburg (18th season)
- Conference: Atlantic 10
- Location: Philadelphia, Pennsylvania
- Home stadium: John W. Smithson Field (capacity: 400)
- Nickname: Hawks
- Colors: Crimson and gray

NCAA tournament appearances
- 1971, 1974

Conference regular season champions
- 2023, 2026

The Saint Joseph's Hawks baseball team is a varsity intercollegiate athletic team of Saint Joseph's University in Philadelphia, Pennsylvania, United States. The team is a member of the Atlantic 10 Conference, which is part of the National Collegiate Athletic Association's Division I. Saint Joseph's first baseball team was fielded in 1894. The team plays its home games at John W. Smithson Field on the campus of Saint Joseph's University. The Hawks previously played at Campbell's Field in Camden, New Jersey before the completion of Smithson Field in 2012. The Hawks are coached by Fritz Hamburg.

== NCAA Tournament appearances ==
Saint Joseph's has participated in the NCAA Division I baseball tournament two times. They have a record of 3–4.

Year	Region	Opponent	Result
1971	District 2	Penn State; Seton Hall; Penn State; Seton Hall	W 3–0; L 1–8; W 2–1; L 1–4
1974	District 2	St. John's; Seton Hall; St. John's	W 4–1; L 3–4; L 0–8

== See also ==
- List of NCAA Division I baseball programs
