= 2021 UMass Minutemen baseball team =

Intercollegiate baseball season

2021 UMass Minutemen baseball
- Conference: Atlantic 10 Conference
- Record: 12–31 (3–17 A-10)
- Head coach: Matt Reynolds (4th season)
- Home stadium: Earl Lorden Field

2021 Atlantic 10 Conference baseball standings
	Conf.						Overall
Team	W		L		T	PCT	W		L		T	PCT
North
Rhode Island ^{x}‍‍‍	14	–	6	–	0	.700	28	–	26	–	1	.518
Saint Joseph's ‍‍‍	15	–	9	–	0	.625	21	–	19	–	0	.525
La Salle ‍‍‍	15	–	9	–	0	.625	32	–	21	–	0	.604
Fordham ‍‍‍	11	–	9	–	0	.550	24	–	19	–	0	.558
St. Bonaventure ‍‍‍	6	–	14	–	0	.300	7	–	24	–	0	.226
UMass ‍‍‍	3	–	16	–	0	.158	13	–	29	–	0	.310
South
VCU ^{x}‍‍‡‍^{y}	13	–	3	–	0	.813	38	–	16	–	0	.704
Dayton ‍‍‍	12	–	4	–	0	.750	25	–	27	–	0	.481
George Washington ‍‍‍	14	–	10	–	0	.583	26	–	19	–	0	.578
Davidson ‍‍‍	11	–	13	–	0	.458	27	–	24	–	0	.529
Saint Louis ‍‍‍	6	–	10	–	0	.375	17	–	31	–	0	.354
Richmond ‍‍‍	5	–	11	–	0	.313	19	–	17	–	0	.528
George Mason ‍‍‍	7	–	17	–	0	.292	14	–	29	–	0	.326
† – Conference champion ‡ – Tournament champion y – Invited to the NCAA tournament As of June 5, 2021; Rankings from D1Baseball

The 2021 UMass Minutemen baseball team represented the University of Massachusetts Amherst during the 2021 NCAA Division I baseball season. The Minutemen played their home games at Earl Lorden Field as a members of the Atlantic 10 Conference. They were led by head coach Matt Reynolds, in his 4th season at UMass.

== Previous season ==
The 2020 UMass Minutemen baseball team notched a 1–8 (0–0) regular season record. The season prematurely ended on March 12, 2020, due to concerns over the COVID-19 pandemic.

== Preseason ==
=== Coaches Poll ===
The Atlantic 10 baseball coaches' poll was released on February 18, 2021. UMass was picked to finish last in the Atlantic 10 regular season.

Coaches' Poll
Predicted finish	Team	Points
1	VCU	151 (4)
2	Fordham	149 (4)
3	Dayton	146 (4)
4	Davidson	117
5	Saint Louis	114 (1)
6	Richmond	109
7	Rhode Island	103
8	George Washington	74
9	Saint Joseph's	71
10	George Mason	46
11	La Salle	40
12	St. Bonaventure	32
13	UMass	31

== Game log ==
2021 UMass Minutemen baseball game log
Legend: = Win = Loss = Canceled Bold = UMass team member * Non-conference game
Regular season (12–31)

March (7–9)
Date	Time (ET)	TV	Opponent	Rank	Stadium	Score	Win	Loss	Save	Attendance	Overall	A10	Sources
March 3	2:00 p.m.		at Northeastern*		Parsons Field; Brookline, Massachusetts	**L** 2–11	Scotti (1–0)	**Dow (0–1)**	—	0	0–1	—	Box Score; Recap
March 6	2:00 p.m.		at Stony Brook*		Joe Nathan Field; Stony Brook, New York	**Canceled (inclement weather)**					0–1	—	
March 7	1:00 p.m.		at Stony Brook*		Joe Nathan Field	**W** 9–4 ^{(7)}	**Shields (1–0)**	Milch (0–1)	—	0	1–1	—	Box Score; Recap
March 7	3:00 p.m.		at Stony Brook*		Joe Nathan Field	**W** 3–1 ^{(5)}	**Steele (1–0)**	Herrmann (0–2)	**Pawloski (1)**	0	2–1	—	Box Score; Recap
March 9	2:00 p.m.		at Central Connecticut*		CCSU Baseball Field; New Britain, Connecticut	**L** 6–8	Neuman (1–0)	**Dow (0–2)**	Sabia (1)	0	2–2	—	Box Score; Recap
March 12	3:00 p.m.		at Merrimack*		GLTS Ballpark; Andover, Massachusetts	**W** 6–4	**Henry (1–0)**	Gillette (0–1)	**Pawloski (2)**	0	3–2	—	Box Score; Recap
March 13	1:00 p.m.		at Merrimack*		GLTS Ballpark	**W** 11–4	**Steele (2–0)**	Amidon (0–2)	—	0	4–2	—	Box Score; Recap
March 14	1:00 p.m.		at Merrimack*		GLTS Ballpark	**L** 1–3	Sorenson (2–0)	**Dalton (1–1)**	Thibault (1)	0	4–3	—	Box Score; Recap
March 20	12:00 p.m.		at Towson*		John B. Schuerholz Park; Towson, Maryland	**L** 7–8	Seils (2–3)	**Steele (2–1)**	Weber (1)	0	4–4	—	Box Score; Recap
March 20	3:00 p.m.		at Towson*		John B. Schuerholz Park	**L** 0–4	**Janowicz (1–0)**	LeBlanc (0–1)	—	0	4–5	—	Box Score; Recap
March 21	12:00 p.m.		at Towson*		John B. Schuerholz Park	**W** 7–4	**Given (1–0)**	Madden (0–2)	**Pawlowski (3)**	0	5–5	—	Box Score; Recap
March 21	3:00 p.m.		at Towson*		John B. Schuerholz Park	**W** 10–1	**Livnat (1–0)**	Ramanjulu (0–4)	—	0	6–5	—	Box Score; Recap
March 24	5:00 p.m.	ESPN+	at Holy Cross*		Fitton Field; Worcester, Massachusetts	**W** 6–2	**Dow (1–2)**	Chudy (0–1)	—	0	7–5	—	Box Score; Recap
March 26	3:00 p.m.		at Northeastern*		Parsons Field	**L** 1–18	Murphy (1–0)	**Steele (2–2)**	—	371	7–6	—	Box Score; Recap
March 27	11:00 a.m.		at Northeastern*		Parsons Field	**L** 2–5 ^{(7)}	Schlitter (1–0)	**LeBlanc (0–2)**	Dufault (1)	325	7–7	—	Box Score; Recap
March 27	2:00 p.m.		at Northeastern*		Parsons Field	**L** 3–4	Yost (1–0)	**Pawloski (0–1)**	Gigliotti (1)	325	7–8	—	Box Score; Recap
March 31	2:00 p.m.		Holy Cross*		Earl Lorden Field; Amherst, Massachusetts	**L** 6–7	Bryant (1–0)	**Pawloski (0–2)**	—	46	7–9	—	Box Score; Recap

April (4–15)
Date	Time (ET)	TV	Opponent	Rank	Stadium	Score	Win	Loss	Save	Attendance	Overall	A10	Sources
April 2	3:00 p.m.		at UConn*; Rivalry		Elliot Ballpark; Storrs, Connecticut	**L** 2–9	Casparius (3–2)	**Steele (2–3)**	—	111	7–10	—	Box Score; Recap
April 3	12:00 p.m.		at UConn*; Rivalry		Elliot Ballpark	**L** 1–11	Peterson (3–1)	**Given (1–1)**	—	176	7–11	—	Box Score; Recap
April 3	3:00 p.m.		at UConn*; Rivalry		Elliot Ballpark	**L** 3–7	Simeone (1–3)	**Livnat (1–1)**	—	211	7–12	—	Box Score; Recap
April 7	3:00 p.m.		Northeastern		Earl Lorden Field	**L** 1–11	Stiehl (1–1)	**Clevenger (0–1)**	—	75	7–13	—	Box Score; Recap
April 9	12:00 p.m.		at Saint Joseph's		Smithson Field; Merion, Pennsylvania	**L** 1–5	McCole (1–1)	**Steele (2–4)**	—	109	7–14	0–1	Box Score; Recap
April 9	3:00 p.m.		at Saint Joseph's		Smithson Field	**L** 5–7 ^{(7)}	Rodriguez (1–1)	**Wittman (0–1)**	—	139	7–15	0–2	Box Score; Recap
April 10	12:00 p.m.		at Saint Joseph's		Smithson Field	**L** 2–10 ^{(7)}	DeVine (1–1)	**Given (1–2)**	—	100	7–16	0–3	Box Score; Recap
April 10	3:00 p.m.		at Saint Joseph's		Smithson Field	**L** 1–6	Rollins (1–1)	**Dalton (1–2)**	—	126	7–17	0–4	Box Score; Recap
April 14	3:00 p.m.	ESPN+	Merrimack*		Earl Lorden Field	**W** 9–8	**Henry (2–0)**	Healy (1–2)	**Wittman (1)**	80	8–17	—	Box Score; Recap
April 17	12:00 p.m.		La Salle		Earl Lorden Field	**L** 5–8	Scanlon (4–2)	**Steele (2–5)**	Kennedy (3)	80	8–18	0–5	Box Score; Recap
April 17	3:30 p.m.		La Salle		Earl Lorden Field	**L** 0–3 ^{(7)}	Elissalt (4–1)	**Livnat (1–2)**	—	85	8–19	0–6	Box Score; Recap
April 18	12:00 p.m.		La Salle		Earl Lorden Field	**L** 3–4 ^{(7)}	Yablonski (2–1)	**Wittman (0–2)**	—	80	8–20	0–7	Box Score; Recap
April 18	3:30 p.m.		La Salle		Earl Lorden Field	**L** 6–11	Maria (2–1)	**Pawloski (0–3)**	Kennedy (4)	80	8–21	0–8	Box Score; Recap
April 20	3:30 p.m.		Sacred Heart*		Earl Lorden Field	**Canceled (inclement weather)**					8–21	—	Recap
April 23	3:00 p.m.		at Rhode Island		Bill Beck Field; Kingston, Rhode Island	**L** 7–8 ^{(10)}	Fernandez (3–2)	**Henry (2–1)**	—	20	8–22	0–9	Box Score; Recap
April 24	12:00 p.m.		at Rhode Island		Smithson Field	**W** 11–2 ^{(7)}	**Steele (3–5)**	Picone (1–2)	—	20	9–22	1–9	Box Score; Recap
April 24	3:00 p.m.		at Rhode Island		Smithson Field	**L** 3–7 ^{(7)}	Webb (4–0)	**Dalton (0–3)**	—	30	9–23	1–10	Box Score; Recap
April 25	12:00 p.m.		at Rhode Island		Smithson Field	**L** 8–10	Levesque (3–1)	**Given (1–3)**	—	40	9–24	1–11	Box Score; Recap
April 27	3:00 p.m.		at Sacred Heart*		Veterans Memorial Park; Bridgeport, Connecticut	**W** 8–6 ^{(11)}	**Wittman (1–2)**	Briggs (2–4)	—	31	9–25	—	Box Score; Recap
April 30	3:00 p.m.	ESPN+	at Fordham		Houlihan Park; Bronx, New York	**W** 4–2	**Lesieur (1–0)**	Knox (1–2)	**Clevenger (1)**	0	10–25	2–11	Box Score; Recap

May (2–6)
Date	Time (ET)	TV	Opponent	Rank	Stadium	Score	Win	Loss	Save	Attendance	Overall	A10	Sources
May 1	12:00 p.m.		at Fordham		Houlihan Park	**L** 3–5 ^{(7)}	Mikulsi (7–0)	**Steele (3–6)**	Kovel (1)	0	10–26	2–12	Box Score; Recap
May 1	3:00 p.m.		at Fordham		Houlihan Park	**W** 8–3 ^{(7)}	**Given (2–3)**	Crowley (3–3)	—	0	11–26	3–12	Box Score; Recap
May 2	12:00 p.m.		at Fordham		Houlihan Park	**L** 1–11 ^{(8)}	Karslo (4–1)	**Dalton (0–4)**	—	0	11–27	3–13	Box Score; Recap
May 4	2:00 p.m.	ESPN+	Boston College*		Earl Lorden Field	**W** 3–2	**Wittman (2–2)**	Vetrano (1–3)	—	75	12–27	—	Box Score; Recap
May 14	3:00 p.m.	ESPN+	St. Bonaventure		Earl Lorden Field	**Canceled (COVID-19 protocols)**					12–27	3–13	Recap
May 15	12:00 p.m.	ESPN+	St. Bonaventure		Earl Lorden Field	**Canceled (COVID-19 protocols)**					12–27	3–13	Recap
May 15	2:30 p.m.	ESPN+	St. Bonaventure		Earl Lorden Field	**Canceled (COVID-19 protocols)**					12–27	3–13	Recap
May 16	12:00 p.m.	ESPN+	St. Bonaventure		Earl Lorden Field	**Canceled (COVID-19 protocols)**					12–27	3–13	Recap
May 20	3:00 p.m.	ESPN+	Rhode Island		Earl Lorden Field	**L** 6–17 ^{(8)}	Twitchell (4–1)	**Given (2–4)**	Moxey (1)	80	12–28	3–14	Box Score; Recap
May 21	12:00 p.m.	ESPN+	Rhode Island		Earl Lorden Field	**L** 2–7 ^{(7)}	Webb (7–1)	**Steele (3–7)**	—	80	12–29	3–15	Box Score; Recap
May 21	3:00 p.m.	ESPN+	Rhode Island		Earl Lorden Field	**L** 5–7 ^{(7)}	Cherry (1–0)	**Aronson (0–1)**	Janglos (1)	80	12–30	3–16	Box Score; Recap
May 22	12:00 p.m.	ESPN+	Rhode Island		Earl Lorden Field	**L** 1–16 ^{(7)}	Levesque (5–2)	**Bergeron (0–1)**	—	100	12–31	3–17	Box Score; Recap

Rankings from USA TODAY/ESPN Top 25 coaches' baseball poll. Parenthesis indicate tournament seedings.

== Rankings ==
Ranking movements Legend: — = Not ranked
	Week																		
Poll	Pre	1	2	3	4	5	6	7	8	9	10	11	12	13	14	15	16	17	Final
Coaches'	—	—*	—	—	—	—	—	—	—	—	—	—	—	—	—	—	—	—	—
Baseball America	—	—	—	—	—	—	—	—	—	—	—	—	—	—	—	—	—	—	—
Collegiate Baseball^	—	—	—	—	—	—	—	—	—	—	—	—	—	—	—	—	—	—	—
NCBWA†	—	—	—	—	—	—	—	—	—	—	—	—	—	—	—	—	—	—	—
D1Baseball	—	—	—	—	—	—	—	—	—	—	—	—	—	—	—	—	—	—	—

^ Collegiate Baseball ranked 40 teams in their preseason poll, but only ranked 30 teams weekly during the season.
† NCBWA ranks 30 teams in their preseason poll, but only ranks 25 teams weekly during the season.
* A new poll was not released for this week, so for comparison purposes, the previous week's ranking is inserted in this week's slot.
