= 2021 Fordham Rams baseball team =

American college baseball season

2021 Fordham Rams baseball
- Conference: Atlantic 10 Conference
- Record: 24–19 (11–9 A-10)
- Head coach: Kevin Leighton (11th season)
- Assistant coaches: Elliot Glynn (2nd season); Pat Porter (3rd season); Tony Mellaci (33rd season)
- Home stadium: Houlihan Park

2021 Atlantic 10 Conference baseball standings
	Conf.						Overall
Team	W		L		T	PCT	W		L		T	PCT
North
Rhode Island ^{x}‍‍‍	14	–	6	–	0	.700	28	–	26	–	1	.518
Saint Joseph's ‍‍‍	15	–	9	–	0	.625	21	–	19	–	0	.525
La Salle ‍‍‍	15	–	9	–	0	.625	32	–	21	–	0	.604
Fordham ‍‍‍	11	–	9	–	0	.550	24	–	19	–	0	.558
St. Bonaventure ‍‍‍	6	–	14	–	0	.300	7	–	24	–	0	.226
UMass ‍‍‍	3	–	16	–	0	.158	13	–	29	–	0	.310
South
VCU ^{x}‍‍‡‍^{y}	13	–	3	–	0	.813	38	–	16	–	0	.704
Dayton ‍‍‍	12	–	4	–	0	.750	25	–	27	–	0	.481
George Washington ‍‍‍	14	–	10	–	0	.583	26	–	19	–	0	.578
Davidson ‍‍‍	11	–	13	–	0	.458	27	–	24	–	0	.529
Saint Louis ‍‍‍	6	–	10	–	0	.375	17	–	31	–	0	.354
Richmond ‍‍‍	5	–	11	–	0	.313	19	–	17	–	0	.528
George Mason ‍‍‍	7	–	17	–	0	.292	14	–	29	–	0	.326
† – Conference champion ‡ – Tournament champion y – Invited to the NCAA tournament As of June 5, 2021; Rankings from D1Baseball

The 2021 Fordham Rams baseball team represented Fordham University during the 2021 NCAA Division I baseball season. It was the program's 162nd season of existence, and their 27th season playing in the Atlantic 10 Conference. General manager, Kevin Leighton assumed managerial duties for the 11th season.

Fordham entered 2021 as the defending Atlantic 10 Tournament champions, but failed to qualify for the tournament. Fordham finished the season 24–19, 11–9 in Atlantic 10 play.

== Preseason ==
=== Coaches Poll ===
The Atlantic 10 baseball coaches' poll was released on February 18, 2021. Fordham was picked to finish second in the Atlantic 10 regular season.

Coaches' Poll
Predicted finish	Team	Points
1	VCU	151 (4)
2	Fordham	149 (4)
3	Dayton	146 (4)
4	Davidson	117
5	Saint Louis	114 (1)
6	Richmond	109
7	Rhode Island	103
8	George Washington	74
9	Saint Joseph's	71
10	George Mason	46
11	La Salle	40
12	St. Bonaventure	32
13	UMass	31

== Roster ==
2021 Fordham Rams baseball team
Players
Coaches

#	Pos.	Name	B/T	Height	Weight	Year	Home town
1	OF	Colton Snelling	L/R	6 ft 10 in (2.08 m)	180 lb (82 kg)	Sr	Chandler, AZ
3	INF	Jack Popolizio	R/R	5 ft 10 in (1.78 m)	180 lb (82 kg)	So	Collegeville, PA
4	INF	Casey Brown	L/R	6 ft 6 in (1.98 m)	250 lb (113 kg)	Sr	Darien, CT
5	INF	Chris Genaro	R/R	6 ft 2 in (1.88 m)	180 lb (82 kg)	Fr	Greenwich, CT
6	P	Joseph Quintal	R/R	6 ft 2 in (1.88 m)	185 lb (84 kg)	Sr	Bedford, NH
7	OF	Alvin Melendez	R/R	6 ft 0 in (1.83 m)	195 lb (88 kg)	Gr	Whitestone, NY
8	INF	Nico Boza	R/R	6 ft 1 in (1.85 m)	175 lb (79 kg)	Fr	Miami Lakes, FL
9	P	James Springer	L/L	6 ft 4 in (1.93 m)	205 lb (93 kg)	So	Bethesda, MD
10	INF	C.J. Vazquez	R/R	6 ft 0 in (1.83 m)	180 lb (82 kg)	Sr	Miami, FL
11		Aidan Tornquist	L/L	5 ft 11 in (1.8 m)	165 lb (75 kg)	So	Dix Hills, NY
12	INF	Trey Maeker	L/L	6 ft 2 in (1.88 m)	230 lb (104 kg)	Fr	Pearland, TX
13	C	Richard Grund	R/R	6 ft 5 in (1.96 m)	195 lb (88 kg)	Jr	Weston, FL
14	C	Andy Semo	R/R	6 ft 0 in (1.83 m)	195 lb (88 kg)	Jr	Coronado, CA
15	P	Gabe Karslo	R/R	6 ft 2 in (1.88 m)	180 lb (82 kg)	Jr	Easton, PA
16	P	Cameron Knox	R/R	6 ft 1 in (1.85 m)	190 lb (86 kg)	Fr	Mt. Lebanon, PA
17	P	Alex Henderson	L/R	6 ft 1 in (1.85 m)	200 lb (91 kg)	So	Saratoga Springs, NY
18	P	Jake Clark	R/L	6 ft 4 in (1.93 m)	185 lb (84 kg)	Fr	Calabasas, CA
19		Joe Bladel	R/R	6 ft 1 in (1.85 m)	185 lb (84 kg)	Fr	Washington, DC
22	P	Cory Wall	R/R	6 ft 4 in (1.93 m)	225 lb (102 kg)	Jr	Roaring Brook, PA
23	OF	Jason Coules	R/R	6 ft 1 in (1.85 m)	205 lb (93 kg)	Jr	Bellmore, NY
24	OF	Jake Guercio	L/L	5 ft 9 in (1.75 m)	170 lb (77 kg)	Jr	West Islip, NY
25	INF	Zach Selinger	R/R	5 ft 11 in (1.8 m)	180 lb (82 kg)	So	Cortlandt Manor, NY
26	INF	Michael Taylor	R/R	6 ft 2 in (1.88 m)	190 lb (86 kg)	Fr	Basking Ridge, NJ
27	P	Declan Lavelle	L/R	6 ft 1 in (1.85 m)	165 lb (75 kg)	Fr	Rey, NY
28	OF	Nick Labella	R/R	5 ft 11 in (1.8 m)	210 lb (95 kg)	Sr	Mesa, AZ
29	P	Alex Hernandez	R/R	6 ft 1 in (1.85 m)	185 lb (84 kg)	Gr	San Mateo, CA
30	INF	Jack Harnisch	L/R	6 ft 0 in (1.83 m)	195 lb (88 kg)	Jr	Colts Neck, NJ
31	P	Ben Kovel	R/R	6 ft 1 in (1.85 m)	205 lb (93 kg)	So	Merrick, NY
32	OF	Ethan Cramer	L/L	5 ft 11 in (1.8 m)	195 lb (88 kg)	Fr	Seattle, WA
33	OF	Terrence Murray	L/L	6 ft 3 in (1.91 m)	195 lb (88 kg)	Jr	Massapequa, NY
34	P	Brooks Ey	R/R	6 ft 1 in (1.85 m)	205 lb (93 kg)	Fr	Philadelphia, PA
35	P	Garrett Crowley	L/L	6 ft 4 in (1.93 m)	210 lb (95 kg)	Jr	Forest Hill, NJ
36	C	Will Findlay	R/R	6 ft 0 in (1.83 m)	220 lb (100 kg)	So	Ledgewood, NJ
37	P	Matt Mikulski	L/L	6 ft 4 in (1.93 m)	205 lb (93 kg)	Sr	Mohegan Lake, NJY
38	P	Nolan Hughes	L/L	6 ft 5 in (1.96 m)	207 lb (94 kg)	Fr	Halifax, MA
39	OF	Ryan Thiesse	R/R	5 ft 11 in (1.8 m)	195 lb (88 kg)	Fr	St. Charles, IL
40	P	Michael Ghiorzi	R/R	6 ft 1 in (1.85 m)	185 lb (84 kg)	Jr	West Palm Beach, FL

Head coach

Kevin Leighton

Assistant coach(es)

Elliot Glynn
Pat Porter
Tony Mellaci

Legend

- (C) Team captain
- (S) Suspended
- (I) Ineligible
- Injured
- Current redshirt

Roster
Last update: March 4, 2021

== Schedule ==
2021 Fordham Rams baseball game log
Regular season (24–19)

February (0–0)
Date	Time (ET)	TV	Opponent	Rank	Stadium	Score	Win	Loss	Save	Attendance	Overall	Atlantic 10	Sources
February 20	12:30 pm		at Villanova*		Villanova Ballpark; Plymouth Meeting, Pennsylvania	Postponed (Inclement weather)					0–0	—	
February 23	3:00 pm		Sacred Heart*		Jim Houlihan Park; The Bronx, New York	Postponed (COVID-19 protocols), makeup dates March 10 and March 27					0–0	—	
February 26	12:00 pm		Sacred Heart*		Jim Houlihan Park	Postponed (COVID-19 protocols), makeup dates March 10 and March 27					0–0	—	
February 27	11:00 am		Sacred Heart*		Jim Houlihan Park	Postponed (COVID-19 protocols), makeup dates March 10 and March 27					0–0	—	
February 27	2:00 pm		Sacred Heart*		Jim Houlihan Park	Postponed (COVID-19 protocols), makeup dates March 10 and March 27					0–0	—	
February 28	12:00 am		Sacred Heart*		Jim Houlihan Park	Postponed (COVID-19 protocols), makeup dates March 10 and March 27					0–0	—	

March (11–5)
Date	Time (ET)	TV	Opponent	Rank	Stadium	Score	Win	Loss	Save	Attendance	Overall	Atlantic 10	Sources
March 6	12:00 pm	ESPN+	NJIT*		Jim Houlihan Park	**W** 5–3	**Mikulski (1–0)**	Fischer (0–1)	**Popolizo (1)**	0	1–0	—	Box Score; Report
March 7	12:00 pm	ESPN+	NJIT*		Jim Houlihan Park	**W** 5–4 ^{(11)}	**Karslo (1–0)**	Craska (0–1)	—	0	2–0	—	Box Score; Report
March 7	4:30 pm	ESPN+	NJIT*		Jim Houlihan Park	**W** 8–2 ^{(7)}	**Crowley (1–0)**	Stafflinger (0–1)	—	0	3–0	—	Box Score; Report
March 9	5:00 pm		at Stony Brook*		Joe Nathan Field; Stony Brook, New York	**W** 9–7	**Henderson (1–0)**	Morrisey (0–1)	**Quintal (1)**	0	4–0	—	Box Score; Report
March 10	2:30 pm		Sacred Heart*; Rescheduled from February 23		Jim Houlihan Park	**W** 10–0	**Karslo (2–0)**	Jeter (0–1)	—	0	5–0	—	Box Score; Report
March 12	2:00 pm		Fairleigh Dickinson*		Jim Houlihan Park	**W** 9–0	**Mikulski (2–0)**	Quijano (0–1)	**Lavelle (1)**	0	6–0	—	Box Score; Report
March 13	12:00 pm		Fairleigh Dickinson*		Jim Houlihan Park	**L** 2–4 ^{(16)}	Baxt (1–0)	**Kovel (0–1)**	—	0	6–1	—	Box Score; Report
March 14	12:00 pm	ESPN+	Fairleigh Dickinson*		Jim Houlihan Park	**W** 6–2	**Henderson (2–0)**	DiMartino (0–1)	—	0	7–1	—	Box Score; Report
March 17	2:30 pm		Army*		Jim Houlihan Park	**Postponed (COVID-19 protocols), make up date April 13**					7–1	—	Report
March 19	3:00 pm		at St. John's*; St. John's rivalry		Jack Kaiser Stadium; Queens, New York	**L** 1–4	Rodriguez (1–0)	**Lavelle (0–1)**	Routzahn (3)	0	7–2	—	Box Score; Report
March 20	11:00 am	ESPN+	St. John's*; St. John's rivalry		Jim Houlihan Park	**W** 7–6 ^{(13)}	**Quintal (1–0)**	Adams (0–1)	—	0	8–2	—	Box Score; Report
March 20	2:00 pm	ESPN+	St. John's*; St. John's rivalry		Jim Houlihan Park	**L** 3–4 ^{(7)}	Cruz (1–0)	**Knox (0–1)**	Rodriguez (1)	0	8–3	—	Box Score; Report
March 21	12:00 pm	ESPN3	at St. John's*; St. John's rivalry		Jack Kaiser Stadium	**W** 7–6 ^{(10)}	**Lavelle (1–1)**	Bianchi (0–1)	—	0	9–3	—	Box Score; Report
March 24	3:00 pm		at Sacred Heart*; Rescheduled from February 27		Veterans Memorial Park; Bridgeport, Connecticut	**L** 4–10	Hansen (1–0)	**Kovel (0–1)**	—	50	9–4	—	Box Score; Report
March 27	1:00 pm		at Delaware*		Bob Hannah Stadium; Newark, Delaware	**W** 15–2	**Mikulski (3–0)**	Ludman (1–3)	—	0	10–4	—	Box Score; Report
March 28	4:30 pm		at Delaware*		Bob Hannah Stadium	**W** 8–1	**Crowley (2–0)**	Velazquez (2–2)	—	0	11–4	—	Box Score; Report
March 31	3:00 pm		at Seton Hall*		Owen T. Carroll Field; South Orange, New Jersey	**L** 3–4	Burnham (1–3)	**Karslo (2–1)**	Miller (1)	0	11–5	—	Box Score; Report

April (7–8)
Date	Time (ET)	TV	Opponent	Rank	Stadium	Score	Win	Loss	Save	Attendance	Overall	Atlantic 10	Sources
April 1	4:00 pm		at Seton Hall*		Owen T. Carroll Field	**L** 4–11	McLinskey (1–0)	**Crowley (2–1)**	—	30	11–6	—	Box Score; Report
April 3	4:00 pm		at Seton Hall*		Owen T. Carroll Field	**W** 1–0	**Mikulski (4–0)**	Festa (1–2)	—	30	12–6	—	Box Score; Report
April 9	1:00 pm	ESPN+	St. Bonaventure		Jim Houlihan Park	**L** 4–7	Devine (1–1)	**Ey (0–1)**	Moffat (1)	0	12–7	0–1	Box Score; Report
April 9	4:00 pm	ESPN+	St. Bonaventure		Jim Houlihan Park	**W** 4–1 ^{(7)}	**Crowley (3–1)**	Moffat (1–2)	—	0	13–7	1–1	Box Score; Report
April 10	1:00 pm	ESPN+	St. Bonaventure		Jim Houlihan Park	**W** 3–0 ^{(7)}	**Mikulski** (5–0)	Baez (0–4)	–	0	14–7	2–1	Box Score; Report
April 10	4:00 pm	ESPN+	St. Bonaventure		Jim Houlihan Park	**W** 7–5	**Karslo** (3–1)	White (0–2)	–	0	15–7	3–1	Box Score; Report
April 13	3:00 pm		Army*; Rescheduled from March 17		Jim Houlihan Park	**W** 3–2	**Knox (1–1)**	Early (1–1)	**Quintal (2)**	0	16–7	—	Box Score; Report
April 16	3:00 pm		at Rhode Island		Bill Beck Field; Kingston, Rhode Island	**Canceled (COVID-19 protocols)**					16–7	3–1	Report
April 17	1:00 pm		at Towson*		John B. Schuerholz Park; Towson, Maryland	**L** 2–3	Reeser (2–3)	**Lavelle (1–2)**	—	5	16–8	—	Box Score
April 17	4:00 pm		at Towson*		John B. Schuerholz Park	**L** 3–5	Pecilunas (2–3)	**Ey (0–2)**	Weber (3)	100	16–9	—	Box Score
April 18	12:00 pm		at Rhode Island		Bill Beck Field	**Canceled (COVID-19 protocols)**						3–1	Report
April 21	3:05 pm		at Army*		Doubleday Field; West Point, New York	**L** 2–8	Dawson (1–0)	**Springer (0–1)**	—	45	16–10	—	Report
April 23	3:00 pm		at Saint Joseph's		Smithson Field; Philadelphia, Pennsylvania	**L** 3–13 ^{(8)}	McCole (2–1)	**Ey (0–3)**	—	300	16–11	3–2	Report
April 24	12:00 pm		at Saint Joseph's		Smithson Field	**W** 3–1 ^{(7)}	**Mikulski (6–0)**	Zimmerman (1–3)	—	225	17–11	4–2	Report
April 24	3:00 pm		at Saint Joseph's		Smithson Field	**L** 1–11 ^{(7)}	Rollins (2–1)	**Crowley (3–2)**	—	225	17–12	4–3	Report
April 25	12:00 pm	ESPN+	at Saint Joseph's		Smithson Field	**W** 3–2 ^{(10)}	**Quintal (2–0)**	Weber (1–1)	—	310	18–12	5–3	Report
April 30	3:00 pm	ESPN+	UMass		Jim Houlihan Park	**L** 2–4	LeSiuer (1–0)	**Knox (1–2)**	Clevenger (1)	0	18–13	5–4	Report

May (6–6)
Date	Time (ET)	TV	Opponent	Rank	Stadium	Score	Win	Loss	Save	Attendance	Overall	Atlantic 10	Sources
May 1	12:00 pm		UMass		Jim Houlihan Park	**W** 5–3 ^{(7)}	**Mikulski (7–0)**	Steele (3–6)	**Kovel (1)**	0	19–13	6–4	Report
May 1	3:00 pm		UMass		Jim Houlihan Park	**L** 3–8 ^{(7)}	Given (2–3)	**Crowley (3–3)**	—	0	19–14	6–5	Report
May 2	12:00 pm		UMass		Jim Houlihan Park	**W** 11–1 ^{(8)}	**Karslo (4–1)**	Dalton (0–4)	—	0	20–14	7–5	Report
May 5	4:00 pm	ESPN+	Army*		Jim Houlihan Park	**L** 8–11 ^{(10)}	Gresham (4–0)	**Quintal (2–1)**	—	30	20–15	—	Report
May 14	3:00 pm	ESPN+	La Salle		Jim Houlihan Park	**L** 2–14 ^{(8)}	Scanlon (7–2)	**Ey (0–4)**	—	40	20–16	7–6	Report
May 15	12:00 pm	ESPN+	La Salle		Jim Houlihan Park	**W** 4–2 ^{(7)}	**Mikulski (8–0)**	Elissalt (6–3)	—	95	21–16	8–6	Report
May 15	3:00 pm	ESPN+	La Salle		Jim Houlihan Park	**L** 4–8 ^{(7)}	Morales (2–5)	**Karslo (4–2)**	—	95	21–17	8–7	Report
May 16	12:00 pm	ESPN+	La Salle		Jim Houlihan Park	**L** 5–9	Rappa (4–1)	**Crowley (3–4)**	—	65	21–18	8–8	Report
May 20	3:00 pm	ESPN+	at St. Bonaventure		Fred Handler Park; Olean, New York	**W** 11–10 ^{(10)}	**Quintal (3–1)**	Moffat (3–5)	**Melendez (1)**	75	22–18	9–8	Report
May 21	12:00 pm	ESPN+	at St. Bonaventure		Fred Handler Park	**W** 2–1 ^{(7)}	**Mikulski (9–0)**	Baez (1–8)	—	100	23–18	10–8	Report
May 21	3:00 pm	ESPN+	at St. Bonaventure		Fred Handler Park	**L** 11–12 ^{(10)}	Breen (1–2)	**Popolizio (0–1)**	—	100	23–19	10–9	Report
May 22	12:00 pm	ESPN+	at St. Bonaventure		Fred Handler Park	**W** 14–12	**Springer (1–1)**	Shimp (0–1)	**Hernandez (1)**	135	24–19	11–9	Report

Legend: = Win = Loss = Cancelled
Bold = Fordham team member * = Non-conference game

Schedule source:

*Rankings are based on the team's current ranking in the D1Baseball poll.

== Rankings ==
Ranking movements Legend: ██ Increase in ranking ██ Decrease in ranking — = Not ranked RV = Received votes
	Week																		
Poll	Pre	1	2	3	4	5	6	7	8	9	10	11	12	13	14	15	16	17	Final
Coaches'	—	—*	—	—	—	—	—	—	—	—	—	—	—	—	—	—	—	—	—
Baseball America	—	—	—	—	—	—	—	—	—	—	—	—	—	—	—	—	—	—	—
Collegiate Baseball^	—	—	—	—	—	—	—	—	—	—	—	—	—	—	—	—	—	—	—
NCBWA†	—	—	—	RV	—	—	—	—	—	—	—	—	—	—	—	—	—	—	—
D1Baseball	—	—	—	—	—	—	—	—	—	—	—	—	—	—	—	—	—	—	—

^ Collegiate Baseball ranked 40 teams in their preseason poll, but only ranked 30 teams weekly during the season.
† NCBWA ranks 30 teams in their preseason poll, but only ranks 25 teams weekly during the season.
* A new poll was not released for this week, so for comparison purposes, the previous week's ranking is inserted in this week's slot.
