= 2021 Dayton Flyers baseball team =

American college baseball season

2021 Dayton Flyers baseball
- Conference: Atlantic 10 Conference
- Record: 24–27 (12–4 A-10)
- Head coach: Jayson King (4th season)
- Assistant coaches: Adam Cornwell (2nd season); Kyle Decker (1st season)
- Pitching coach: Travis Ferrick (4th season)
- Home stadium: Woerner Field

2021 Atlantic 10 Conference baseball standings
	Conf.						Overall
Team	W		L		T	PCT	W		L		T	PCT
North
Rhode Island ^{x}‍‍‍	14	–	6	–	0	.700	28	–	26	–	1	.518
Saint Joseph's ‍‍‍	15	–	9	–	0	.625	21	–	19	–	0	.525
La Salle ‍‍‍	15	–	9	–	0	.625	32	–	21	–	0	.604
Fordham ‍‍‍	11	–	9	–	0	.550	24	–	19	–	0	.558
St. Bonaventure ‍‍‍	6	–	14	–	0	.300	7	–	24	–	0	.226
UMass ‍‍‍	3	–	16	–	0	.158	13	–	29	–	0	.310
South
VCU ^{x}‍‍‡‍^{y}	13	–	3	–	0	.813	38	–	16	–	0	.704
Dayton ‍‍‍	12	–	4	–	0	.750	25	–	27	–	0	.481
George Washington ‍‍‍	14	–	10	–	0	.583	26	–	19	–	0	.578
Davidson ‍‍‍	11	–	13	–	0	.458	27	–	24	–	0	.529
Saint Louis ‍‍‍	6	–	10	–	0	.375	17	–	31	–	0	.354
Richmond ‍‍‍	5	–	11	–	0	.313	19	–	17	–	0	.528
George Mason ‍‍‍	7	–	17	–	0	.292	14	–	29	–	0	.326
† – Conference champion ‡ – Tournament champion y – Invited to the NCAA tournament As of June 5, 2021; Rankings from D1Baseball

The 2021 Dayton Flyers baseball team represented the University of Dayton during the 2021 NCAA Division I baseball season. The Flyers played their home games at Woerner Field as a member of the Atlantic 10 Conference. They were led by head coach Jayson King, in his 4th season at Dayton.

Dayton finished the season second overall in the Atlantic 10 standings, and reached the A-10 Final Series, before losing to VCU.

== Previous season ==
The 2020 Dayton Flyers baseball team recorded a 6–8 (0–0) regular season record. The season prematurely ended on March 12, 2020, due to concerns over the COVID-19 pandemic.

== Preseason ==
=== Coaches Poll ===
The Atlantic 10 baseball coaches' poll was released on February 18, 2021. Dayton was picked to finish third in the Atlantic 10.

Coaches' Poll
Predicted finish	Team	Points
1	VCU	151 (4)
2	Fordham	149 (4)
3	Dayton	146 (4)
4	Davidson	117
5	Saint Louis	114 (1)
6	Richmond	109
7	Rhode Island	103
8	George Washington	74
9	Saint Joseph's	71
10	George Mason	46
11	La Salle	40
12	St. Bonaventure	32
13	UMass	31

== Personnel ==
=== Roster ===
2021 Dayton Flyers baseball roster
Pitchers: 5 - Justin Longbrake - Graduate; 6 - Dylan Keller - Junior; 9 - Nate Espelin - Sophomore; 17 - R.J. Wagner - Graduate; 18 - Nick Rispoli - Freshman; 19 - Cameron Burford - (redshirt) Freshman; 20 - Brock Begesha - Freshman; 22 - Austin Brush - Freshman; 24 - Tyler Jones - Graduate; 25 - Eli Majick - Freshman; 26 - Parker Bard - Freshman; 27 - Nick Wissman - Freshman; 30 - Jonathan Brus - Senior; 33 - Cole Pletka - Senior; 34 - Andrew Zapka - Senior; 35 - Anthony Hattrup - Sophomore; 37 - Brian Robertson - Sophomore; 40 - Ben Petschke - Freshman; 41 - Nick Maue - (redshirt) Sophomore; 44 - Hunter Wolfe - Senior; 53 - Thomas Baybrooks - Junior; 54 - Ben Olson - Graduate	Catchers: 4 - Chase Melnick - Freshman; 10 - Jay Curtis - Junior; 16 - Nolan Watson - Senior; 29 - Louis Oliveri - Junior; Infielders: 1 - Mariano Ricciardi - Senior; 2 - Riley Tirotta - Senior; 3 - Benjamin Blackwell - Junior; 14 - Keegan Sueltz - Junior; 21 - Andrew Casey - Freshman; 28 - Leo Dionicio - Freshman; 31 - Marcos Pujols - Junior; 32 - Nick Lukac - Freshman; 42 - Alex Brickman - Graduate	Outfielders: 7 - Mitchell Garrity - Senior; 8 - Michael Cleary - Senior; 13 - Chris Cabrera - Graduate; 23 - Anthony Steinhardt - Freshman; 50 - Eddie Pursinger - Graduate; Utility: 11 - Bryce Hellgeth - Junior; 12 - Jared Howell - Senior; 15 - Jake Silverstein - Junior

=== Coaching staff ===
2021 Dayton Flyers baseball coaching staff
Name	Position	Seasons at Dayton	Alma mater
Jayson King	Head coach	4	Framingham (1993)
Adam Cornwell	Assistant Coach	4	Ball State (2018)
Kyle Decker	Assistant Coach	1	Oberlin (2016)
Travis Ferrick	Pitching Coach	3	Boston College (2017)

== Game log ==
2021 Dayton Flyers baseball game log (24–27)
Legend: = Win = Loss = Canceled Bold = Dayton team member
Regular season (22–25)

February (1–5)
Date	Time (CT)	TV	Opponent	Rank	Stadium	Score	Win	Loss	Save	Attendance	Overall	Atlantic 10	Sources
February 19	4:00 pm	SECN+	at No. 18 South Carolina*		Founders Park; Columbia, South Carolina	**L** 1–12	Farr (1–0)	**Wolfe (0–1)**	—	1,938	0–1	—	Box Score; Report
February 20	1:00 pm	SECN+	at No. 18 South Carolina*		Founders Park	**L** 5–12	Peters (1–0)	**Olson (0–1)**	—	1,938	0–2	—	Box Score; Report
February 21	12:00 pm	SECN+	at No. 18 South Carolina*		Founders Park	**L** 1–5	Kerry (1–0)	**Zapka (0–1)**	—	1,938	0–3	—	Box Score; Report
February 26	1:00 pm		at Campbell*		Jim Perry Stadium; Buies Creek, North Carolina	**L** 1–8	Chasse (2–0)	**Wolfe (0–2)**	—	56	0–4	—	Box Score; Report
February 27	3:00 pm		at Campbell*		Jim Perry Stadium	**W** 5–4	**Zapka (1–1)**	Harrington (0–1)	—	70	1–4	—	Box Score; Report
February 28	12:00 pm		at Campbell*		Jim Perry Stadium	**L** 2–1	Heintzman (1–0)	**Pletka (0–1)**	—	80	1–5	—	Box Score; Report

March (8–10)
Date	Time (CT)	TV	Opponent	Rank	Stadium	Score	Win	Loss	Save	Attendance	Overall	Atlantic 10	Sources
March 3	6:00 pm	SECN+	at No. 13 Tennessee*		Lindsey Nelson Stadium; Knoxville, Tennessee	Cancelled						—	Report
March 5	3:00 pm		Oakland*		Woerner Field; Dayton, Ohio	**W** 10–1	**Wolfe (1–2)**	Densmore (1–2)	—	73	2–5	—	Box Score; Report
March 6	12:00 pm		Oakland*		Woerner Field	**L** 3–5 ^{(7)}	Hill (1–0)	**Olson (0–2)**	Nierman (2)	60	2–6	—	Box Score; Report
March 6	3:00 pm		Oakland*		Woerner Field	**L** 1–2 ^{(7)}	Deans (2–0)	**Brush (0–1)**	—	60	2–7	—	Box Score; Report
March 7	3:00 pm		Oakland*		Woerner Field	**W** 7–6	**Jones (1–0)**	Tucker (0–2)	—	60	3–7	—	Box Score; Report
March 12	3:00 pm		North Dakota State*		Woerner Field	**L** 1–5	Feeney (2–0)	**Jones (1–1)**	Harm (2)	60	3–8	—	Box Score; Report
March 13	1:00 pm		North Dakota State*		Woerner Field	**L** 1–9	Sankey (3–0)	**Olson (0–3)**	—	60	3–9	—	Box Score; Report
March 14	1:00 pm		North Dakota State*		Woerner Field	**L** 3–4	B. Smith (2–0)	**Keller (0–1)**	Roehrich (1)	60	3–10	—	Box Score; Report
March 16	1:00 pm		North Dakota State*		Woerner Field	**L** 3–9	Z. Smith (2–0)	**Pletka (0–2)**	—	60	3–11	—	Box Score; Report
March 19	3:00 pm		Central Michigan*		Woerner Field	**W** 3–1	**Longbrake (1–0)**	Leatherman (0–1)	—	60	4–11	—	Box Score; Report
March 20	12:00 pm		Central Michigan*		Woerner Field	**L** 4–5	Taylor (3–1)	**Keller (0–2)**	Frazer (1)	60	4–12	—	Box Score; Report
March 20	3:00 pm		Central Michigan*		Woerner Field	**L** 3–13 ^{(7)}	Brown (2–0)	**Olson (0–4)**	—	60	4–13	—	Box Score; Report
March 21	1:00 pm		Central Michigan*		Woerner Field	**L** 4–15	Leatherman (1–1)	**Wissman (0–1)**	—	60	4–14	—	Box Score; Report
March 24	6:00 pm		at Eastern Kentucky*		Turkey Hughes Field; Richmond, Kentucky	**W** 20–13	**Howell (1–0)**	Laster (0–1)	—	212	5–14	—	Box Score; Report
March 26	3:00 pm		Kent State*		Woerner Field	**W** 14–2	**Wolfe (2–2)**	Lane (1–1)	—	60	6–14	—	Box Score; Report
March 27	1:00 pm		Kent State*		Woerner Field	**L** 3–11	Albright (4–2)	**Olson (0–5)**	—	60	6–15	—	Box Score; Report
March 28	1:00 pm		at Kent State*		Schoonover Stadium; Kent, Ohio	**W** 10–5 ^{(7)}	**Brus (1–0)**	Dell (0–2)	**Hellgeth (1)**	74	7–15	—	Box Score; Report
March 28	4:00 pm		at Kent State*		Schoonover Stadium	**W** 4–0 ^{(7)}	**Pletka (1–2)**	Romel (1–4)	—	67	8–15	—	Box Score; Report
March 30	3:00 pm		Akron*		Woerner Field	**W** 18–7	**Wissman (1–1)**	Phillips (0–1)	—	60	9–15	—	Box Score; Report

April (5–8)
Date	Time (CT)	TV	Opponent	Rank	Stadium	Score	Win	Loss	Save	Attendance	Overall	Atlantic 10	Sources
April 2	1:00 pm		at Xavier*		Page Hayden Field; Cincinnati, Ohio	**W** 4–1	**Wolfe (3–2)**	Olson (2–1)	—	132	10–15	—	Box Score; Report
April 2	4:00 pm		at Xavier*		Page Hayden Field	**L** 1–5	Zwack (2–2)	**Keller (0–3)**	—	130	10–16	—	Box Score; Report
April 3	12:00 pm		Xavier*		Woerner Field	**L** 16–24	Lanoue (1–0)	**Olson (0–6)**	—	60	10–17	—	Box Score; Report
April 3	3:00 pm		Xavier*		Woerner Field	**L** 11–14	Schramm (1–0)	**Silverstein (0–1)**	—	60	10–18	—	Box Score; Report
April 6	3:00 pm		Morehead State*		Woerner Field	**L** 7–10	Miller (2–0)	**Hattrup (0–1)**	Bakke (3)	60	10–19	—	Box Score; Report
April 9	5:00 pm		at Davidson		Wilson Field; Davidson, North Carolina	**L** 1–2 ^{(7)}	Levy (4–2)	**Wolfe (4–2)**	—	50	10–20	0–1	Box Score; Report
April 9	8:00 pm		at Davidson		Wilson Field	**L** 8–10	Peaden (3–1)	**Olson (0–7)**	Devos (6)	50	10–21	0–2	Box Score; Report
April 10	12:30 pm		at Davidson		Wilson Field	**L** 9–12	Hely (4–1)	**Pletka (1–3)**	Devos (7)	50	10–22	0–3	Box Score; Report
April 11	1:00 pm		at Davidson		Wilson Field	**W** 11–5	**Olson (1–7)**	Fenton (1–4)	—	50	11–22	1–3	Box Score; Report
April 16	3:00 pm		George Mason		Day Air Ballpark; Dayton, Ohio	**L** 6–7	Lyons (4–1)	**Wolfe (3–4)**	—	871	11–23	1–4	Box Score; Report
April 17	12:00 pm		George Mason		Woerner Field	**W** 11–1 ^{(7)}	**Olson (2–7)**	Versaw-Barnes (1–4)	—	60	12–23	2–4	Box Score; Report
April 17	3:00 pm		George Mason		Woerner Field	**W** 12–10 ^{(7)}	**Longbrake (2–0)**	Baek (0–1)	**Petschke (1)**	60	13–23	3–4	Box Score; Report
April 18	12:00 pm		George Mason		Woerner Field	**W** 14–3 ^{(7)}	**Bard (1–0)**	Stoudemire (1–7)	—	60	14–23	4–4	Box Score; Report
April 20	3:00 pm		at Akron*		Skeeles Field; Akron, Ohio	Canceled (COVID-19 protocols)					14–23	—	Report
April 23	3:00 pm		Saint Louis		Woerner Field	Canceled (COVID-19 protocols)					14–23	4–4	Report
April 24	12:00 pm		Saint Louis		Day Air Ballpark	Canceled (COVID-19 protocols)					14–23	4–4	Report
April 24	3:00 pm		Saint Louis		Day Air Ballpark	Canceled (COVID-19 protocols)					14–23	4–4	Report
April 25	12:00 pm		Saint Louis		Woerner Field	Canceled (COVID-19 protocols)					14–23	4–4	Report
April 28	3:00 pm		Eastern Kentucky*		Woerner Field	Canceled (COVID-19 protocols)					14–23	—	Report

May (8–2)
Date	Time (CT)	TV	Opponent	Rank	Stadium	Score	Win	Loss	Save	Attendance	Overall	Atlantic 10	Sources
May 7	10:00 am		at Richmond		Pitt Field; Tuckahoe, Virginia	**W** 8–3	**Wolfe (4–4)**	Mathes (2–1)	**Hellgeth (2)**	0	15–23	5–4	Box Score; Report
May 8	12:00 pm		at Richmond		Pitt Field	**W** 3–2	**Olson (3–7)**	Neff (1–2)	**Longbrake (1)**	0	16–23	6–4	Box Score; Report
May 8	3:00 pm		at Richmond		Pitt Field	**W** 5–2	**Bard (2–0)**	Wyatt (2–2)	**Wagner (1)**	0	17–23	7–4	Box Score; Report
May 9	12:00 pm		at Richmond		Pitt Field	**W** 20–10	**Hattrup (1–1)**	Marcus (2–2)	—	0	18–23	8–4	Box Score; Report
May 14	6:30 pm		at VCU		The Diamond; Richmond, Virginia	Canceled (COVID-19 protocols)					18–23	8–4	Report
May 15	2:00 pm		at VCU		The Diamond	Canceled (COVID-19 protocols)					18–23	8–4	Report
May 15	5:00 pm		at VCU		The Diamond	Canceled (COVID-19 protocols)					18–23	8–4	Report
May 16	12:00 pm		at West Virginia*		Monongalia County Ballpark; Granville, West Virginia	**L** 6–7 ^{(7)}	Carlson (4–4)	**Wagner (0–2)**	Gonzalez (2)	600	18–24	—	Box Score; Report
May 16	3:00 pm		at West Virginia*		Monongalia County Ballpark	**L** 6–12 ^{(7)}	Abernathy (2–0)	**Hattrup (1–2)**	—	600	18–25	—	Box Score; Report
May 20	3:00 pm		George Washington		Woerner Field	**W** 6–4	**Hellgeth (1–0)**	Kahler (2–1)	—	60	19–25	9–4	Box Score; Report
May 21	12:00 pm		George Washington		Day Air Ballpark	**W** 11–4	**Longbrake (3–0)**	Cohen (5–3)	**Brus (1)**	800	20–25	10–4	Box Score; Report
May 21	3:00 pm		George Washington		Day Air Ballpark	**W** 7–4	**Hattrup (2–2)**	Edwards (5–4)	—	800	21–25	11–4	Box Score; Report
May 22	12:00 pm		George Washington		Woerner Field	**W** 14–9	**Bard (3–0)**	Harris (3–1)	—	60	22–25	12–4	[Box Score] Report

Post-Season (2–2)

Atlantic 10 Tournament (2–2)
Date	Time (CT)	TV	Opponent	Rank	Stadium	Score	Win	Loss	Save	Attendance	Overall	Postseason	Sources
May 27	3:30 pm	ESPN+	vs. (3) Rhode Island; Quarterfinals	(2)	The Diamond	**L** 2–8	Twitchell (5–1)	**Wolfe (4–5)**	French (2)	821	22–26	0–1	Box Score; Report
May 27	8:00 pm	ESPN+	vs. (4) Saint Joseph's; Losers Semifinals	(2)	The Diamond	**W** 11–5	**Hellgeth (2–0)**	Smith (2–2)	—	821	23–26	1–1	Box Score; Report
May 27	3:30 pm	ESPN+	vs. (3) Rhode Island; Losers Final	(2)	The Diamond	**W** 3–1	**Wagner (1–2)**	Cherry (1–1)	**Longbrake (2)**	678	24–26	2–1	Box Score; Report
May 28	4:30 pm	ESPN+	at (1) No. 28 VCU; Finals – Game 1	(2)	The Diamond	**L** 6–7	Masloff (2–0)	**Wolfe (4–6)**	Chenier (6)	728	24–27	2–2	Box Score; Report
