= 2021 VCU Rams baseball team =

American college baseball season

2021 VCU Rams baseball

Atlantic 10 regular season champion Atlantic 10 Southern Division champion Atlantic 10 tournament champions

NCAA tournament, Starkville Regional
- Conference: Atlantic 10 Conference
- CB: No. 27
- Record: 38–16 (13–3 A-10)
- Head coach: Shawn Stiffler (9th season)
- Assistant coaches: Mike McRae (4th season); Rich Witten (4th season); Josh Tutwiler (6th season)
- Home stadium: The Diamond

2021 Atlantic 10 Conference baseball standings
| | Conf. | | | | | | Overall |
| Team | W | | L | | T | PCT | W | | L | | T | PCT |
|---|---|---|---|---|---|---|---|---|---|---|---|---|
North
| Rhode Island ^{x}‍‍‍ | 14 | – | 6 | – | 0 | .700 | 28 | – | 26 | – | 1 | .518 |
| Saint Joseph's ‍‍‍ | 15 | – | 9 | – | 0 | .625 | 21 | – | 19 | – | 0 | .525 |
| La Salle ‍‍‍ | 15 | – | 9 | – | 0 | .625 | 32 | – | 21 | – | 0 | .604 |
| Fordham ‍‍‍ | 11 | – | 9 | – | 0 | .550 | 24 | – | 19 | – | 0 | .558 |
| St. Bonaventure ‍‍‍ | 6 | – | 14 | – | 0 | .300 | 7 | – | 24 | – | 0 | .226 |
| UMass ‍‍‍ | 3 | – | 16 | – | 0 | .158 | 13 | – | 29 | – | 0 | .310 |
South
| VCU ^{x}‍‍‡‍^{y} | 13 | – | 3 | – | 0 | .813 | 38 | – | 16 | – | 0 | .704 |
| Dayton ‍‍‍ | 12 | – | 4 | – | 0 | .750 | 25 | – | 27 | – | 0 | .481 |
| George Washington ‍‍‍ | 14 | – | 10 | – | 0 | .583 | 26 | – | 19 | – | 0 | .578 |
| Davidson ‍‍‍ | 11 | – | 13 | – | 0 | .458 | 27 | – | 24 | – | 0 | .529 |
| Saint Louis ‍‍‍ | 6 | – | 10 | – | 0 | .375 | 17 | – | 31 | – | 0 | .354 |
| Richmond ‍‍‍ | 5 | – | 11 | – | 0 | .313 | 19 | – | 17 | – | 0 | .528 |
| George Mason ‍‍‍ | 7 | – | 17 | – | 0 | .292 | 14 | – | 29 | – | 0 | .326 |
† – Conference champion ‡ – Tournament champion y – Invited to the NCAA tournament As of June 5, 2021; Rankings from D1Baseball

The 2021 VCU Rams baseball team represented Virginia Commonwealth University during the 2021 NCAA Division I baseball season. The Rams played their home games at The Diamond as a member of the Atlantic 10 Conference. They were led by head coach Shawn Stiffler, in his 9th season at VCU.

VCU qualified for the NCAA tournament for the first time since 2015, and received their highest seeding (2) since 2001. They were eliminated in the Regional, with a final record of 38–16, including a program record 22-game win streak.

== Previous season ==
The 2020 VCU Rams baseball team notched a 9–8 (0–0) regular season record. The season prematurely ended on March 12, 2020, due to concerns over the COVID-19 pandemic.

== Player movement ==
=== Departures ===
VCU Departures
| Name | Number | Pos. | Height | Weight | Year | Hometown | Notes |
|---|---|---|---|---|---|---|---|
| Michael Dailey | 30 | RHP | 5 ft 11 in (1.80 m) | 170 | RS-Sr. | Troy, Virginia | Graduated |
| Paul Witt | 2 | INF | 5 ft 11 in (1.80 m) | 170 | Sr. | Harpers Ferry, West Virginia | Graduated |
| Brett Willett | 3 | INF | 6 ft 2 in (1.88 m) | 190 | Sr. | Middletown, Delaware | Graduated |

=== Transfers ===
Incoming transfers
| Name | Number | Pos. | Height | Weight | Year | Hometown | Previous School |
|---|---|---|---|---|---|---|---|
| Greg Ryan | 13 | INF | 6 ft 1 in (1.85 m) | 200 | So. | Bensley, Virginia | Pitt |

=== Signing Day Recruits ===
The following players signed National Letter of Intents to play for VCU in 2021.

| Player | Hometown | Previous Team |
Pitchers
| Tyler Davis | Yorktown, Virginia | Menchville HS |
| Campbell Ellis | Georgetown, Ontario | Christ the King SS |
| Trent Goodman | Ashland, Virginia | Homeschooled |
| Braedin Hunt | Old Bridge, New Jersey | Christian Brothers Academy |
| Justin Humenay | Beaconsfield, Quebec | Taft School |
Hitters
| Griffin Boone | Montclair, Virginia | Forest Park HS |
| Tyler Coy | Williamsville, New York | Canisius HS |
| Jared Glinski | Lynchburg, Virginia | Brookville HS |
| Connor Hujsak | Goffstown, New Hampshire | Goffstown HS |

== Preseason ==
=== Coaches Poll ===
The Atlantic 10 baseball coaches' poll was released on February 18, 2021. VCU was picked to win the Atlantic 10 regular season championship.

Coaches' Poll
| Predicted finish | Team | Points |
| 1 | VCU | 151 (4) |
| 2 | Fordham | 149 (4) |
| 3 | Dayton | 146 (4) |
| 4 | Davidson | 117 |
| 5 | Saint Louis | 114 (1) |
| 6 | Richmond | 109 |
| 7 | Rhode Island | 103 |
| 8 | George Washington | 74 |
| 9 | Saint Joseph's | 71 |
| 10 | George Mason | 46 |
| 11 | La Salle | 40 |
| 12 | St. Bonaventure | 32 |
| 13 | UMass | 31 |

== Personnel ==
=== Roster ===
2021 VCU Rams baseball roster
| Pitchers: 9 Nick Evangelista - Junior; 10 Edwin Serrano - Junior; 18 Justin Sorokowski - (redshirt) Junior; 19 Jack Schroeder - Junior; 20 Jaden Griffin - Sophomore; 23 Devin Dunn - Junior; 24 Maddison Furman - Sophomore; 25 Jack Masloff - Freshman; 30 Michael Dailey - Senior; 33 Mason Delane - Freshman; 34 Bradford Webb - Graduate; 36 Andrew Ward - Freshman; 38 Danny Watson - Sophomore; 39 Evan Chenier - Sophomore; 41 Cameron Goble - Freshman; 43 Caleb Plummer - Sophomore; 45 Tyler Davis - Freshman; 46 Campbell Ellis - Freshman; 50 Justin Humenay - Freshman; 55 Braedin Hunt - Freshman | Catchers: 15 - Hunter Vay - Junior; 17 - Josh Simon - Senior; 21 - Logan Amiss - Freshman; 31 - Connor Hicks - (redshirt) Freshman; 37 - Nic Ericsson - Freshman; 44 - Tyler Coy - Freshman; Infielders: 1 - Steven Carpenter - Senior; 2 - Michael Haydak - Sophomore; 3 - Connor Hujsak - Freshman; 4 - Aidan Healy - Freshman; 6 - Griffin Boone - Freshman; 13 - Greg Ryan - Sophomore; 16 - Liam Hibbits - Junior; 22 - Andrew Puglielli - Senior; 27 - Brett Young - (redshirt) Freshman; 28 - Tyler Locklear - Freshman; 40 - Will Carlone - Freshman | Outfielders: 12 - Brandon Henson - Senior; 26 - Cooper Benzin - (redshirt) Freshman; 32 - Devan Barnett - Freshman; 42 - Ryan Shavers - Sophomore; Utility: 8 - Hogan Brown - Junior |

=== Coaching staff ===
2021 VCU Rams baseball coaching staff
| Name | Position | Seasons at VCU | Alma mater |
|---|---|---|---|
| Shawn Stiffler | Head coach | 9 | George Mason University (2001) |
| Mike McRae | Assistant Coach | 4 | Niagara University (1993) |
| Rich Witten | Assistant Coach | 4 | Coastal Carolina University (2012) |
| Josh Tutwiler | Assistant Coach | 6 | Old Dominion University (2012) |

== Game log ==
Legend
| | VCU win |
| | VCU loss |
| | Postponement/cancellation |
| (10) | Extra innings |
| * | Non-conference game |
| **Bold** | VCU team member |
| † | Make-Up Game |

2021 VCU Rams baseball game log (38–16)
Regular season (34–14)

February (1–5)
| Date | Time (ET) | TV | Opponent | Rank | Stadium | Score | Win | Loss | Save | Attendance | Overall | Atlantic 10 | Sources |
|---|---|---|---|---|---|---|---|---|---|---|---|---|---|
| February 20 | 4:00 p.m. | SDN | at UNCW* | | Brooks Field; Wilmington, North Carolina | **L** 4–5 | Benton (1–0) | **Watson (0–1)** | — | 100 | 0–1 | — | Stats; Report |
| February 21 | 1:00 p.m. | SDN | at UNCW* | | Brooks Field | **L** 1–4 | Gessell (1–0) | **Sorokowski (0–1)** | Benton (1) | 100 | 0–2 | — | Stats; Report |
| February 22 | 4:30 p.m. | SDN | at UNCW* | | Brooks Field | **L** 5–9 | Hudak (1–0) | **Davis (0–1)** | Smith (1) | 100 | 0–3 | — | Stats; Report |
| February 27 | 12:30 p.m. | YouTube | at Elon* | | Latham Park; Elon, North Carolina | **L** 6–7 | Sprake (1–0) | **Serrano (0–1)** | — | 65 | 0–4 | — | Stats; Report |
| February 27 | 5:00 p.m. | YouTube | at Elon* | | Latham Park | **W** 4–3 | **Davis (1–1)** | Greenler (0–3) | — | 65 | 1–4 | — | Stats; Report |
| February 28 | 1:00 p.m. | YouTube | at Elon* | | Latham Park | **L** 7–8 ^{(10)} | Sprake (2–0) | **Watson (0–2)** | — | 65 | 1–5 | — | Stats; Report |

March (12–5)
| Date | Time (ET) | TV | Opponent | Rank | Stadium | Score | Win | Loss | Save | Attendance | Overall | Atlantic 10 | Sources |
|---|---|---|---|---|---|---|---|---|---|---|---|---|---|
| March 2 | 3:00 p.m. | ESPN+ | VMI* | | The Diamond; Richmond, Virginia | **W** 10–8 | **Ellis (1–0)** | Menders (0–1) | — | 215 | 2–5 | — | Stats; Report |
| March 5 | 2:00 p.m. | ESPN+ | at VMI* | | Gray–Minor Stadium; Lexington, Virginia | **W** 17–2 | **Watson (1–2)** | Light (0–2) | — | 86 | 3–5 | — | Stats; Report |
| March 6 | 2:00 p.m. | ESPN+ | Central Michigan* | | The Diamond | **W** 12–11 | **Davis (2–1)** | Palmbland (0–1) | **Serrano (1)** | 252 | 4–5 | — | Stats; Report |
| March 7 | 3:00 p.m. | ESPN+ | at VMI* | | Gray–Minor Stadium | **W** 18–7 | **Chenier (1–0)** | Capehart (0–1) | — | 106 | 5–5 | — | Stats; Report |
| March 9 | 4:00 p.m. | ACCNX | at No. 18 Virginia Tech* | | English Field; Blacksburg, Virginia | **L** 9–10 | Siverling (2–0) | **Ward (0–1)** | — | 1,000 | 5–6 | — | Stats; Report |
| March 10 | 3:00 p.m. | ACCNX | at No. 18 Virginia Tech* | | English Field | **W** 10–7 | **Webb (1–0)** | Ritchey (0–1) | — | 780 | 6–6 | — | Stats; Report |
| March 12 | 6:30 p.m. | ESPN+ | Towson* | | The Diamond | **W** 14–9 | **Chenier (2–0)** | Seils (1–3) | — | 217 | 7–6 | — | Stats; Report |
| March 13 | 2:00 p.m. | ESPN+ | Towson* | | The Diamond | **L** 7–8 | Clark (1–0) | **Serrano (0–2)** | Bolt (1) | 228 | 7–7 | — | Stats; Report |
| March 14 | 1:00 p.m. | ESPN+ | Towson* | | The Diamond | **W** 5–1 | **Ellis (2–0)** | Madden (0–1) | **Davis (1)** | 200 | 8–7 | — | Stats; Report |
| March 17 | 3:00 p.m. | CUSA.tv | at No. 25 Old Dominion*; Old Dominion rivalry | | Metheny Field; Norfolk, Virginia | **W** 12–5 | **Webb (2–0)** | Vaks (1–1) | — | 211 | 9–7 | — | Stats; Report |
| March 19 | 4:00 p.m. | ESPN+ | Liberty* | | The Diamond | Postponed (inclement weather), makeup date April 3 | | | | | 9–7 | — | |
| March 20 | 2:00 p.m. | ESPN+ | at Liberty* | | Liberty Baseball Stadium; Lynchburg, Virginia | **L** 2–3 | Riley (1–0) | **Watson (1–3)** | — | 528 | 9–8 | — | Stats; Report |
| March 21 | 2:00 p.m. | ESPN+ | Liberty* | | The Diamond | **L** 1–6 | Gibson (3–2) | **Dailey (0–1)** | — | 282 | 9–9 | — | Stats; Report |
| March 23 | 6:00 p.m. | ESPN+ | No. 22 Old Dominion* | | The Diamond | **L** 3–5 | Dobzanski (1–0) | **Serrano (0–3)** | Dean (2) | 197 | 9–10 | — | Stats; Report |
| March 26 | 4:00 p.m. | ESPN+ | at William & Mary* | | Plumeri Park; Williamsburg, Virginia | **W** 8–6 | **Davis (4–1)** | Strain (2–2) | **Chenier (1)** | 133 | 10–10 | — | Stats; Report |
| March 27 | 1:00 p.m. | ESPN3 | William & Mary* | | The Diamond | **W** 6–3 | **Ellis (3–0)** | Haney (0–2) | **Watson (1)** | 273 | 11–10 | — | Stats; Recap |
| March 27 | 4:30 p.m. | ESPN3 | William & Mary* | | The Diamond | **W** 9–4 | **Ward (1–1)** | Pearson (1–2) | — | 273 | 12–10 | — | Box Score; Recap |
| March 30 | 5:00 p.m. | YouTube | at Elon* | | Latham Park | **W** 6–3 | **Chenier (3–0)** | Simon (0–4) | **Davis (2)** | 65 | 13–10 | — | Box Score; Recap |

April (11–4)
| Date | Time (ET) | TV | Opponent | Rank | Stadium | Score | Win | Loss | Save | Attendance | Overall | Atlantic 10 | Sources |
|---|---|---|---|---|---|---|---|---|---|---|---|---|---|
| April 2 | 2:00 p.m. | ESPN+ | at Liberty* | | Liberty Baseball Stadium | **L** 3–9 | Erickson (6–1) | **Ellis (3–1)** | — | 187 | 13–11 | — | Stats; Report |
| April 3 | 2:00 p.m. | ESPN+ | Liberty*; Rescheduled from March 19 | | The Diamond | **W** 4–2 | **Davis (5–1)** | Gibson (4–3) | **Chenier (2)** | 197 | 14–11 | — | Stats; Report |
| April 7 | 6:00 p.m. | ESPN+ | at Georgetown* | | Shirley Povich Field; Bethesda, Maryland | **W** 13–4 | **Griffin (1–0)** | Weeks (0–1) | — | 0 | 15–11 | — | Stats; Report |
| April 9 | 3:00 p.m. | ESPN+ | at George Washington | | Barcroft Park; Arlington, Virginia | **W** 6–4 | **Davis (6–1)** | Pfluger (0–1) | **Chenier (3)** | 0 | 16–11 | 1–0 | Stats; Report |
| April 10 | 12:15 p.m. | ESPN+ | at George Washington | | Barcroft Park | **L** 4–5 | Cohen (3–1) | **Webb (1–1)** | — | 0 | 16–12 | 1–1 | Stats; Report |
| April 10 | 4:00 p.m. | ESPN+ | at George Washington (DH) | | Barcroft Park | **L** 2–3 | Kuncl (2–0) | **Serrano (0–4)** | — | 0 | 16–13 | 1–2 | Stats; Report |
| April 11 | 12:00 p.m. | ESPN+ | at George Washington | | Barcroft Park | **L** 4–5 | Kahler (1–0) | **Watson (1–4)** | Kuncl (3) | 0 | 16–14 | 1–3 | Stats; Report |
| April 13 | 6:00 p.m. | | at William & Mary* | | Plumeri Park | **W** 8–3 | **Serrano (1–4)** | Mack (0–1) | — | 188 | 17–14 | — | Stats; Report |
| April 16 | 6:30 p.m. | ESPN+ | Davidson | | The Diamond | **W** 14–3 | **Webb (2–1)** | Levy (4–3) | **Griffin (1)** | 233 | 18–14 | 2–3 | Stats; Report |
| April 17 | 2:00 p.m. | ESPN+ | Davidson | | The Diamond | **W** 9–8 | **Davis (7–1)** | Peaden (3–2) | — | 354 | 19–14 | 3–3 | Stats; Report |
| April 17 | 5:00 p.m. | ESPN+ | Davidson (DH) | | The Diamond | **W** 5–1 | **Furman (1–0)** | Peaden (3–3) | **Chenier (4)** | 354 | 20–14 | 4–3 | Stats; Report |
| April 18 | 1:00 p.m. | ESPN+ | Davidson | | The Diamond | **W** 3–1 | **Serrano (2–4)** | Fenton (1–5) | **Ellis (1)** | 218 | 21–14 | 5–3 | Stats; Report |
| April 20 | 7:00 p.m. | ESPN+ | Virginia*; Duel at the Diamond | | The Diamond | **W** 5–3 | **Griffin (2–0)** | McGarry (0–5) | **Davis (3)** | 971 | 22–14 | — | Stats; Report |
| April 23 | 6:00 p.m. | ESPN+ | at Richmond; Capital City Classic | | Pitt Field; Tuckahoe, Virginia | Canceled (COVID-19 protocols) | | | | | 22–14 | 5–3 | Report |
| April 24 | 1:00 p.m. | ESPN+ | at Richmond; Capital City Classic | | Pitt Field | Canceled (COVID-19 protocols) | | | | | 22–14 | 5–3 | Report |
| April 24 | 4:00 p.m. | ESPN+ | at Richmond (DH); Capital City Classic | | Pitt Field | Canceled (COVID-19 protocols) | | | | | 22–14 | 5–3 | Report |
| April 25 | 1:00 p.m. | ESPN+ | at Richmond; Capital City Classic | | Pitt Field | Canceled (COVID-19 protocols) | | | | | 22–14 | 5–3 | Report |
| April 27 | 6:30 p.m. | ESPN+ | VMI* | | The Diamond | **W** 15–5 | **Ward (2–1)** | Ewald (0–2) | — | 394 | 23–14 | — | Stats; Report |
| April 30 | 6:30 p.m. | ESPN+ | George Mason; George Mason rivalry | | The Diamond | **W** 9–2 | **Webb (3–1)** | Lyons (4–2) | **Davis (4)** | 285 | 24–14 | 6–3 | Stats; Recap |

May (10–0)
| Date | Time (ET) | TV | Opponent | Rank | Stadium | Score | Win | Loss | Save | Attendance | Overall | Atlantic 10 | Sources |
|---|---|---|---|---|---|---|---|---|---|---|---|---|---|
| May 1 | 2:00 p.m. | ESPN+ | George Mason; George Mason rivalry | | The Diamond | **W** 3–1 | Watson (2–4) | Versaw-Barnes (1–5) | **Chenier (5)** | 302 | 25–14 | 7–3 | Stats; Report |
| May 1 | 5:00 p.m. | ESPN+ | George Mason (DH); George Mason rivalry | | The Diamond | **W** 8–1 | Ellis (4–1) | Cabone (0–2) | — | 302 | 26–14 | 8–3 | Stats; Report |
| May 2 | 1:00 p.m. | ESPN+ | George Mason; George Mason rivalry | | The Diamond | **W** 11–2 | Delane (1–0) | Stoudemire (1–8) | — | 640 | 27–14 | 9–3 | Stats; Report |
| May 4 | 6:00 p.m. | ACCNX | at Virginia*; Duel at the Diamond | | Davenport Field; Charlottesville, Virginia | **W** 7–5 | Serrano (3–4) | Schoch (2–1) | **Davis (5)** | 474 | 28–14 | — | Stats; Report |
| May 7 | 1:00 p.m. | ESPN+ | at Saint Louis | | Billiken Sports Center; St. Louis, Missouri | **W** 14–6 | Delane (2–0) | Harris (4–3) | — | 85 | 29–14 | 10–3 | Stats; Report |
| May 7 | 4:45 p.m. | ESPN+ | at Saint Louis | | Billiken Sports Center | **W** 19–4 | Davis (8–1) | Fremion (2–1) | — | 60 | 30–14 | 11–3 | Stats; Report |
| May 8 | 3:00 p.m. | ESPN+ | at Saint Louis (DH) | | Billiken Sports Center | **W** 9–8 ^{(10)} | Ellis (5–1) | Surin (0–1) | — | 55 | 31–14 | 12–3 | Stats; Report |
| May 8 | 6:00 p.m. | ESPN+ | at Saint Louis | | Billiken Sports Center | **W** 16–5 ^{(8)} | Masloff (1–0) | Youngbrandt (2–6) | — | 45 | 32–14 | 13–3 | Stats; Report |
| May 14 | 6:30 p.m. | ESPN+ | Dayton | No. 28 | The Diamond | Canceled (COVID-19 protocols) | | | | | 32–14 | 13–3 | Report |
| May 15 | 2:00 p.m. | ESPN+ | Dayton | No. 28 | The Diamond | Canceled (COVID-19 protocols) | | | | | 32–14 | 13–3 | Report |
| May 15 | 5:00 p.m. | ESPN+ | Dayton (DH) | No. 28 | The Diamond | Canceled (COVID-19 protocols) | | | | | 32–14 | 13–3 | Report |
| May 16 | 1:00 p.m. | ESPN+ | Dayton | No. 28 | The Diamond | Canceled (COVID-19 protocols) | | | | | 32–14 | 13–3 | Report |
| May 20 | 6:00 p.m. | | at James Madison* | No. 28 | Veterans Memorial Park; Harrisonburg, Virginia | **W** 20–18 ^{(10)} | Davis (9–1) | Landess (1–1) | — | 250 | 33–14 | — | Stats; Report |
| May 21 | 6:00 p.m. | | at James Madison* | No. 28 | Veterans Memorial Park; Harrisonburg, Virginia | **W** 10–1 | Ward (3–1) | McDonnell (1–3) | — | 250 | 34–14 | — | Stats; Report |

Postseason (4–2)

Atlantic 10 Tournament (3–0)
| Date | Time (ET) | TV | Opponent | Rank | Stadium | Score | Win | Loss | Save | Attendance | Overall | A10T Record | Sources |
|---|---|---|---|---|---|---|---|---|---|---|---|---|---|
| May 27 | 12:00 p.m. | ESPN+ | (4) Saint Joseph's; Quarterfinals | No. 28 (1) | The Diamond | **W** 15–4 | **Delane (3–0)** | McCole (2–4) | — | 821 | 35–14 | 1–0 | [Stats] [Report] |
| May 28 | 11:00 a.m. | ESPN+ | (3) Rhode Island; Semifinals | No. 28 (1) | The Diamond | **W** 10–4 | **Serrano (4–4)** | Janglos (2–3) | — | 678 | 36–14 | 2–0 | [Stats] [Report] |
| May 29 | 12:00 p.m. | ESPN+ | (2) Dayton; Final, Game 1 | No. 28 (1) | The Diamond | **W** 7–6 | **Masloff (2–0)** | Wolfe (4–6) | **Chenier (6)** | 728 | 37–14 | 3–0 | [Stats] [Report] |

NCAA Starkville Regional (1–2)
| Date | Time (ET) | TV | Opponent | Rank | Stadium | Score | Win | Loss | Save | Attendance | Overall | NCAAT Record | Sources |
|---|---|---|---|---|---|---|---|---|---|---|---|---|---|
| June 4 | 8:00 p.m. | ESPN3 | vs. (3) Campbell; Regional Opening Round | No. 27 (2) | Dudy Noble Field; Starkville, Mississippi | **W** 19–4 | **Ellis (6–1)** | Harrington (6–3) | — | 7,577 | 38–14 | 1–0 | Stats; Report |
| June 5 | 9:25 p.m. | ESPN3 | at (1) No. 8 Mississippi State; Regional semifinal | No. 27 (2) | Dudy Noble Field | **L** 4–16 | MacLeod (6–4) | **Delane (3–1)** | — | 10,011 | 38–15 | 1–1 | Stats; Report |
| June 6 | 7:00 p.m. | ESPN3 | vs. (3) Campbell; Losers Regional final | No. 27 (2) | Dudy Noble Field | **L** 10–19 | Cummings (2–2) | **Davis (9–2)** | — | 7,498 | 38–16 | 1–2 | Box Score; Report |

*Denotes non–conference game • Schedule source • Rankings based on the teams' current ranking in the Collegiate Baseball poll • (#) Tournament seedings in parentheses.

== Tournaments ==
=== Atlantic 10 Tournament ===
Atlantic 10 Tournament Teams
| (1) VCU Rams | (2) Dayton Flyers | (3) Rhode Island Rams | (4) Saint Joseph's Hawks |

Thursday, May 27
1 | VCU | 15
4 | St. Joseph's | 4
Winner's bracket
3 | Rhode Island | 8
2 | Dayton | 2
4 | St. Joseph's | 5
2 | Dayton | 11
Loser's bracket

Friday, May 28
1 | VCU | 10
3 | Rhode Island | 4
2 | Dayton | 3
3 | Rhode Island | 1

Saturday, May 29
1 | VCU | 7 | –
2 | Dayton | 6 | –

=== NCAA Starkville Regional ===
Starkville Regional Teams
| (1) Mississippi State Bulldogs | (2) VCU Rams | (3) Campbell Fighting Camels | (4) Samford Bulldogs |

First round
1 | Mississippi State | 8
4 | Samford | 4
Winner's bracket
3 | Campbell | 4
2 | VCU | 19
4 | Samford | 13
3 | Campbell | 16
Loser's bracket

Semi-Finals
1 | Mississippi State | 16
2 | VCU | 4
3 | Campbell | 19
2 | VCU | 10

Finals
1 | Mississippi State | 6 | –
3 | Campbell | 5 | –

== Rankings ==
Ranking movements Legend: ██ Increase in ranking ██ Decrease in ranking — = Not ranked RV = Received votes
| | Week | | | | | | | | | | | | | | | | | | |
| Poll | Pre | 1 | 2 | 3 | 4 | 5 | 6 | 7 | 8 | 9 | 10 | 11 | 12 | 13 | 14 | 15 | 16 | 17 | Final |
|---|---|---|---|---|---|---|---|---|---|---|---|---|---|---|---|---|---|---|---|
| Coaches' | — | —* | — | — | — | — | — | — | — | — | — | RV | RV | RV | RV | RV | RV | — | RV |
| Baseball America | — | — | — | — | — | — | — | — | — | — | — | — | — | — | — | — | — | — | — |
| Collegiate Baseball^ | RV | — | — | — | — | — | — | — | — | — | RV | RV | RV | 28 | 28 | 27 | RV | RV | RV |
| NCBWA† | — | — | — | — | — | — | — | — | — | RV | RV | RV | RV | RV | RV | RV | RV | RV | RV |
| D1Baseball | — | — | — | — | — | — | — | — | — | — | — | — | — | — | — | — | — | — | — |

^ Collegiate Baseball ranked 40 teams in their preseason poll, but only ranked 30 teams weekly during the season.
† NCBWA ranks 30 teams in their preseason poll, but only ranks 25 teams weekly during the season.
* A new poll was not released for this week, so for comparison purposes, the previous week's ranking is inserted in this week's slot.

== Awards and honors ==
Atlantic 10 Conference Weekly Awards
| Player | Award | Date Awarded | Ref. |
|---|---|---|---|
| Sonny Ulliana | Player of the Week | April 26, 2021 | |
| Addison Kopack | Rookie of the Week | April 26, 2021 | |
| Xavier Vargas | Player of the Week | May 3, 2021 | |

All-A10
| Player | Position | Team |
|---|---|---|
| Austin White | OF | 1 |
| Mike Webb | RHP | 1 |
