= Jayson King =

American college baseball coach

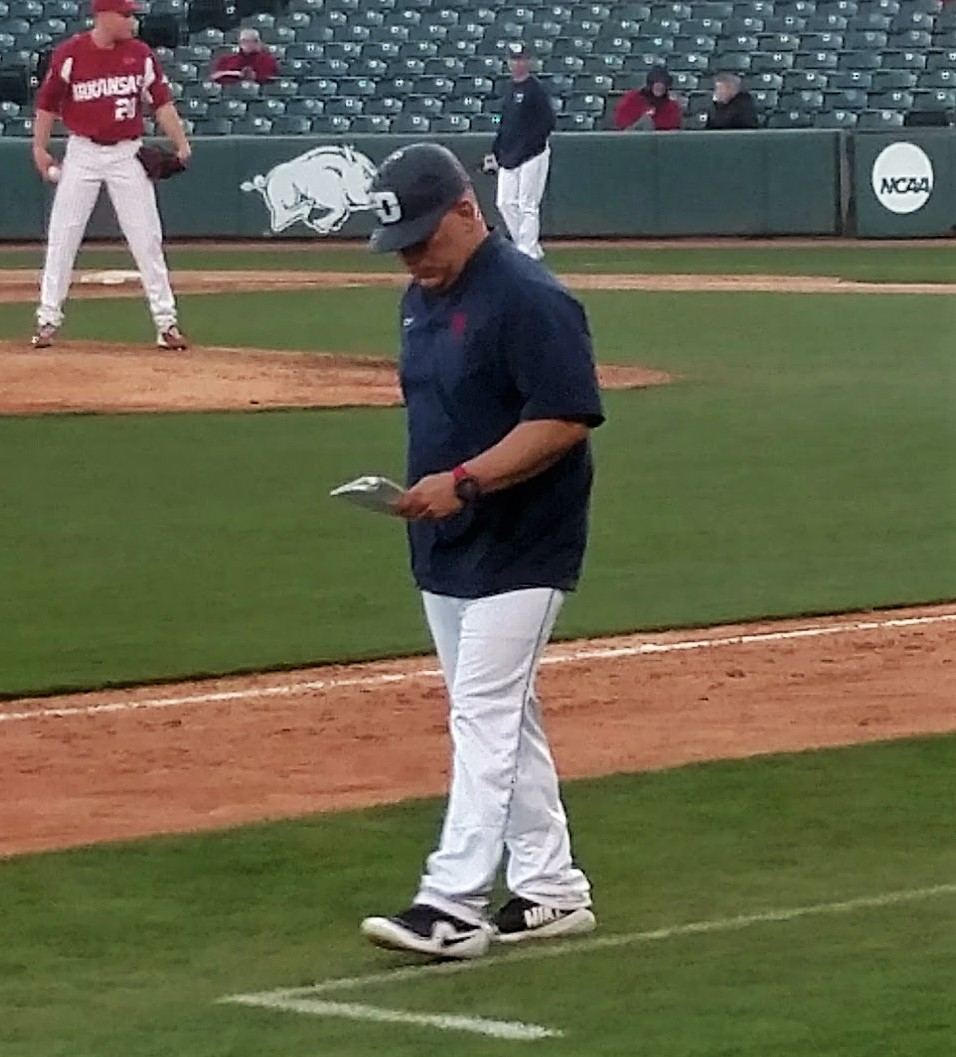
- King in 2018

Current position
- Title: Head coach
- Team: Dayton
- Conference: Atlantic 10
- Record: 196–201–1

Biographical details
- Born: Canton, Massachusetts, U.S.

Playing career
- 1990–1993: Framingham State
- Position: Catcher

Coaching career (HC unless noted)
- 1996: Springfield (graduate assistant)
- 1997–1998: UMass Boston
- 1999–2016: Franklin Pierce
- 2017: Army (Associate HC)
- 2018–2024: Dayton
- 2025: Vanderbilt (assistant)
- 2026–present: Dayton

Head coaching record
- Overall: 869–540–4
- Tournaments: A10: 7–6

Jayson King is an American college baseball coach, currently in his second stint as head coach at Dayton. He was previously the long-time head coach of the Franklin Pierce College Ravens. In 1998, King managed the Bourne Braves, a collegiate summer baseball team in the prestigious Cape Cod Baseball League. He has additionally coached the Lowell Spinners and the United States national baseball team. He is a native of Oakwood, Ohio. He and his wife Missy have two children.

== Head coaching record ==
Record table
Season	Team	Overall	Conference	Standing	Postseason
UMass Boston Beacons (Little East Conference) (1997–1998)
1997	UMass Boston	7–25	2–12	3rd (North)	
1998	UMass Boston	13–21	5–9	5th	
UMass Boston:		20–48	7–21		
Franklin Pierce Ravens (New England Collegiate Conference) (1999–2000)
1999	Franklin Pierce	17–22	5–13		
2000	Franklin Pierce	21–19–1	9–3		
Franklin Pierce:			14–16		
Franklin Pierce Ravens (Northeast-10 Conference) (2001–2016)
2001	Franklin Pierce	25–22	18–14		
2002	Franklin Pierce	31–17	22–10		
2003	Franklin Pierce	32–17	18–9	T-1st (Markey)	NCAA National Finals
2004	Franklin Pierce	32–23	23–8		
2005	Franklin Pierce	32–14	21–9		
2006	Franklin Pierce	46–13	25–5	1st	NCAA National Finals
2007	Franklin Pierce	49–11	26–4	1st	NCAA National Finals
2008	Franklin Pierce	42–15	20–10	3rd	NCAA National Finals
2009	Franklin Pierce	37–18	24–6	1st	NCAA Regional
2010	Franklin Pierce	43–17–1	19–6–1	2nd	NCAA National Finals
2011	Franklin Pierce	40–14	19–7	3rd	NCAA Regional
2012	Franklin Pierce	38–19–1	14–6–1	T-1st (Northeast)	NCAA Regional
2013	Franklin Pierce	37–19	15–6	1st (Northeast)	NCAA National Finals
2014	Franklin Pierce	35–18	15–6	T-1st (Northeast)	NCAA Regional
2015	Franklin Pierce	48–4	20–1	1st (Northeast)	NCAA Regional
2016	Franklin Pierce	48–9	25–2	1st (Northeast)	NCAA National Finals
Franklin Pierce:		653–291–3	338–125–2		
Dayton Flyers (Atlantic 10 Conference) (2018–2024)
2018	Dayton	21–31	10–14	9th	
2019	Dayton	32–26–1	16–8	3rd	Atlantic 10 Tournament
2020	Dayton	6–8	0–0		Season canceled due to COVID-19
2021	Dayton	24–27	12–4	2nd (South)	Atlantic 10 Tournament
2022	Dayton	23–27	10–14	8th	
2023	Dayton	26–34	15–9	T–3rd	Atlantic 10 Tournament
2024	Dayton	33–22	14–9	3rd	Atlantic 10 Tournament
Dayton Flyers (Atlantic 10 Conference) (2026–present)
2026	Dayton	31–26	15–15	7th	
Dayton:		196–201–1	68–64		
Total:		869–540–4			
National champion Postseason invitational champion Conference regular season champion Conference regular season and conference tournament champion Division regular season champion Division regular season and conference tournament champion Conference tournament champion
