= 2021 Saint Louis Billikens baseball team =

American college baseball season

2021 Saint Louis Billikens baseball
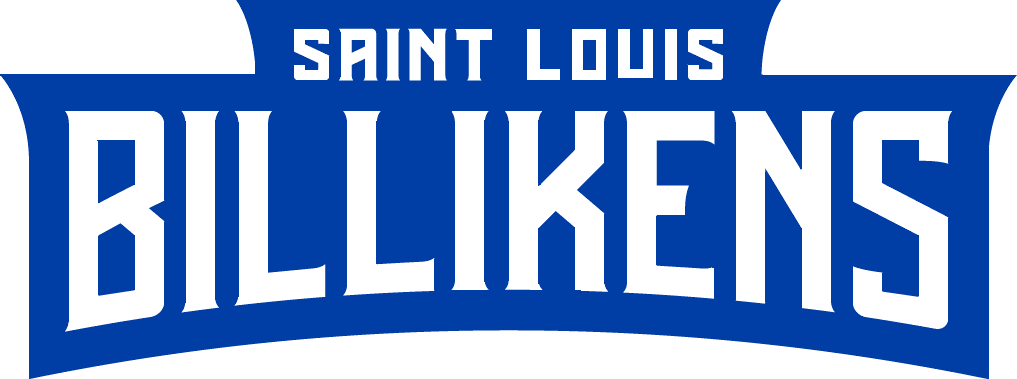
- Conference: Atlantic 10 Conference
- Record: 17–31 (6–10 A-10)
- Head coach: Darin Hendrickson (13th season)
- Assistant coaches: Evan Pratte (3rd season); Will Schierholz (4th season); Logan Moon (1st season)
- Home stadium: Billiken Sports Center

2021 Atlantic 10 Conference baseball standings
	Conf.						Overall
Team	W		L		T	PCT	W		L		T	PCT
North
Rhode Island ^{x}‍‍‍	14	–	6	–	0	.700	28	–	26	–	1	.518
Saint Joseph's ‍‍‍	15	–	9	–	0	.625	21	–	19	–	0	.525
La Salle ‍‍‍	15	–	9	–	0	.625	32	–	21	–	0	.604
Fordham ‍‍‍	11	–	9	–	0	.550	24	–	19	–	0	.558
St. Bonaventure ‍‍‍	6	–	14	–	0	.300	7	–	24	–	0	.226
UMass ‍‍‍	3	–	16	–	0	.158	13	–	29	–	0	.310
South
VCU ^{x}‍‍‡‍^{y}	13	–	3	–	0	.813	38	–	16	–	0	.704
Dayton ‍‍‍	12	–	4	–	0	.750	25	–	27	–	0	.481
George Washington ‍‍‍	14	–	10	–	0	.583	26	–	19	–	0	.578
Davidson ‍‍‍	11	–	13	–	0	.458	27	–	24	–	0	.529
Saint Louis ‍‍‍	6	–	10	–	0	.375	17	–	31	–	0	.354
Richmond ‍‍‍	5	–	11	–	0	.313	19	–	17	–	0	.528
George Mason ‍‍‍	7	–	17	–	0	.292	14	–	29	–	0	.326
† – Conference champion ‡ – Tournament champion y – Invited to the NCAA tournament As of June 5, 2021; Rankings from D1Baseball

The 2021 Saint Louis Billikens baseball team represented Saint Louis University during the 2021 NCAA Division I baseball season. The Billikens played their home games at Billiken Sports Center as a members of the Atlantic 10 Conference. They were led by head coach Darin Hendrickson, in his 13th season at Saint Louis.

== Previous season ==
The 2020 Saint Louis Billikens baseball team notched a 10–6 (0–0) regular season record. The season prematurely ended on March 12, 2020, due to concerns over the COVID-19 pandemic.

== Preseason ==
=== Coaches Poll ===
The Atlantic 10 baseball coaches' poll was released on February 18, 2021. Saint Louis was picked to finish fifth the Atlantic 10 regular season championship.

Coaches' Poll
Predicted finish	Team	Points
1	VCU	151 (4)
2	Fordham	149 (4)
3	Dayton	146 (4)
4	Davidson	117
5	Saint Louis	114 (1)
6	Richmond	109
7	Rhode Island	103
8	George Washington	74
9	Saint Joseph's	71
10	George Mason	46
11	La Salle	40
12	St. Bonaventure	32
13	UMass	31

== Personnel ==
=== Roster ===
2021 Saint Louis Billikens baseball roster
Pitchers: 8 - Randon Dauman - Freshman; 9 - Scott Youngbrandt - Sophomore; 12 - Ryan Nolan - Senior; 13 - Trevor Harris - Junior; 14 - Henry McIntosh - Freshman; 16 - Mark Finkleburg - Senior; 17 - Charlie Sheehan - Senior; 19 - Matt Boyer - Freshman; 20 - Marius Balandis - Junior; 21 Grant Fremion - Sophomore; 27 - Colin Townsend - Junior; 29 - Jake Little - Freshman; 32 - Reid Hendrickson - Sophomore; 34 - Parker Stoyan - Freshman; 36 - Ryan Patel - Sophomore; 37 - Ryan Surin - Sophomore	Catchers: 18 - Ryan Hernandez - Junior; 33 - Nolan Bowser - Freshman; Infielders: 1 - Brendan Carrane - Freshman; 2 - Colten Schild - Sophomore; 3 - Zach Frieling - Junior; 5 - Thomas Kane - Freshman; 6 - Matt Dunham - Sophomore; 7 - Matt Happ - Junior; 15 - Tyler Fogarty - Freshman; 22 - Kyle Fitzgerald - Junior; 31 - Sam Polk - Freshman	Outfielders: 4 - George Sutherland - Junior; 11 - Cole Smith - Freshman; 30 - Colin Bergmann - Freshman; 38 - Will Ross - Freshman; 40 - Matt Turino - Junior; Utility: 25 - Jake Garella - Senior; 28 - Cam Redding - Sophomore

=== Coaching staff ===
Name	Position	Seasons at SLU	Alma mater
Darin Hendrickson	Head coach	13	Southern Illinois University Edwardsville (1991)
Evan Pratte	Assistant Coach	3	Southwest Missouri State University (1996)
Will Schierholz	Assistant Coach	4	Miami University (2014)
Logan Moon	Volunteer Assistant Coach	1	Missouri Southern State University (2014)

== Game log ==
2021 Saint Louis Billikens baseball game log
Legend: = Win = Loss = Canceled Bold = Saint Louis team member
Regular season (17–31)

February (1–6)
Date	Time (CT)	TV	Opponent	Rank	Stadium	Score	Win	Loss	Save	Attendance	Overall	Atlantic 10	Sources
February 19	3:00 pm	YouTube	at Kennesaw State*		Fred Stillwell Stadium; Kennesaw, Georgia	**W** 8–7	**Sheehan (1–0)**	Finney (0–1)	**Hendrickson (1)**	120	1–0	—	Stats
February 20	12:00 pm	YouTube	at Kennesaw State*		Fred Stillwell Stadium	**L** 1–5	Rice (1–0)	**Balandis (0–1)**	Rine (1)	120	1–1	—	Stats
February 20	3:00 pm	YouTube	at Kennesaw State*		Fred Stillwell Stadium	**L** 1–2	Kennedy (1–0)	**Finkleburg (0–1)**	Johnson (1)	120	1–2	—	Stats
February 21	12:00 pm	YouTube	at Kennesaw State*		Fred Stillwell Stadium	**L** 4–5	Stills (1–0)	**Youngbrandt (0–1)**	Rodriguez (1)	250	1–3	—	Stats
February 26	1:00 pm		North Dakota State*		Billiken Sports Center; St. Louis, Missouri	**L** 4–7	Drew (1–0)	**Harris (0–1)**	Nelson (1)	45	1–4	—	Stats
February 27	1:00 pm		North Dakota State*		Billiken Sports Center	**L** 4–5	Feeney (1–0)	**Finkleburg (0–2)**	Harm (1)	50	1–5	—	Stats
February 27	4:00 pm		North Dakota State*		Billiken Sports Center	**L** 5–6	Smith (1–0)	**Dauman (0–1)**	Riedinger (1)	50	1–6	—	Stats
February 28	12:00 pm		North Dakota State*		Billiken Sports Center	1–3 ^{(4)}	**Canceled (inclement weather)** (Note: The game was cancelled in the fourth inning due to rain. North Dakota State was leading, 3–1, at the time of cancellation.)					—	Report

March (6–10)
Date	Time (CT)	TV	Opponent	Rank	Stadium	Score	Win	Loss	Save	Attendance	Overall	Atlantic 10	Sources
March 2	3:00 pm		at SIUE*		Roy E. Lee Field; Edwardsville, Illinois	**L** 1–11	Matheny (2–1)	**Harris (0–2)**	—	50	1–7	—	Stats
March 5	6:30 pm		Kansas*		Billiken Sports Center	**W** 8–1	**Boyer (1–0)**	Cyr (2–1)	—	50	2–7	—	Stats
March 6	4:00 pm		Kansas*		Billiken Sports Center	**L** 1–5	Larsen (1–1)	**Finkleburg (0–3)**	Ulane (2)	50	2–8	—	Stats
March 7	1:00 pm		Kansas*		Billiken Sports Center	**L** 5–7 ^{(12)}	Hegarty (1–1)	**Hendrickson (0–1)**	Ulane (3)	50	2–9	—	Stats
March 10	3:00 pm	KTGR	Missouri*		Billiken Sports Center	**L** 1–2	Lohse (1–1)	**Sheehan (1–1)**	—	104	2–10	—	Stats
March 12	3:00 pm	ESPN+	Western Illinois*		Billiken Sports Center	**W** 4–3	**Surin (1–0)**	Carberry (0–2)	—	85	3–10	—	Stats
March 13	2:00 pm	ESPN+	Western Illinois*		Billiken Sports Center	**L** 0–11	Fochs (2–1)	**Finkleburg (0–4)**	—	85	3–11	—	Stats
March 14	1:00 pm	ESPN+	Western Illinois*		Billiken Sports Center	**W** 14–0	**Youngbrandt (1–1)**	Warkentien (0–2)	—	85	4–11	—	Stats
March 16	3:00 pm	ESPN+	Southeast Missouri State*		Billiken Sports Center	**L** 6–8	Grossius (1–0)	**Hendrickson (0–2)**	Williams (1)	85	4–12	—	Stats
March 19	6:00 pm		Oral Roberts*		Billiken Sports Center	**L** 7–14	Coffey (2–1)	**Boyer (1–1)**	—	50	4–13	—	Stats
March 20	2:00 pm		Oral Roberts*		Billiken Sports Center	**W** 6–2	**Youngbrandt (2–1)**	Rogen (1–2)	—	50	5–13	—	Stats
March 21	1:00 pm		Oral Roberts*		Billiken Sports Center	**W** 4–1	**Harris (1–2)**	Notary (0–3)	—	75	6–13	—	Stats
March 23	6:00 pm		SIUE*		Billiken Sports Center	**L** 1–6	Swanson (1–0)	**Finkleburg (0–5)**	—	50	6–14	—	Stats
March 26	6:00 pm	ESPN+	at Cincinnati*		UC Baseball Stadium; Cincinnati, Ohio	**L** 4–8	McCarthy (1–1)	**Boyer (1–2)**	—	300	6–15	—	Stats
March 27	4:00 pm	ESPN+	at Cincinnati*		UC Baseball Stadium	**L** 5–8	Murphy (1–1)	**Youngbrandt (2–2)**	—	807	6–16	—	Stats
March 28	1:00 pm	ESPN+	at Cincinnati*		UC Baseball Stadium	**W** 21–6	**Harris (2–2)**	Batcho (0–3)	—	228	7–16	—	Stats

April (6–7)
Date	Time (CT)	TV	Opponent	Rank	Stadium	Score	Win	Loss	Save	Attendance	Overall	Atlantic 10	Sources
April 1	3:00 pm	ESPN+	No. 25 Indiana State*		Billiken Sports Center	**L** 2–8	Cline (3–0)	**Finkleburg (0–6)**	—	75	7–17	—	Stats
April 2	3:00 pm		No. 25 Indiana State*		Billiken Sports Center	**L** 2–13	Guerrero (5–0)	**Youngbrandt (2–3)**	—	75	7–18	—	Stats
April 3	1:00 pm		No. 25 Indiana State*		Billiken Sports Center	**W** 8–5	**Sheehan (2–1)**	Weaver (0–2)	**Patel (1)**	75	8–18	—	Stats
April 6	6:00 pm		at SIUE*		Roy E. Lee Field; Edwardsville, Illinois	**L** 10–16	Waterhouse (1–2)	**Hendrickson (0–3)**	—	100	8–19	—	Stats
April 9	11:00 am	ESPN+	at George Mason		Spuhler Field; Fairfax, Virginia	**L** 3–7	Lyons (3–1)	**Youngbrandt (2–4)**	—	0	8–20	0–1	Stats
April 9	3:00 pm	ESPN+	at George Mason		Spuhler Field	**W** 6–4	**Townsend (1–0)**	Versaw-Barnes (1–3)	—	0	9–20	1–1	Stats
April 10	5:00 pm	ESPN+	at George Mason		Spuhler Field	**W** 7–0	**Harris (3–2)**	Stoudemire (1–6)	—	0	10–20	2–1	Stats
April 11	5:00 pm	ESPN+	at George Mason		Spuhler Field	**W** 4–2	**Fremion (1–0)**	Cabone (0–1)	**Hendrickson (2)**	0	11–20	3–1	Stats
April 16	3:00 pm		Richmond		Billiken Sports Center	**Canceled (COVID-19 protocols)**					11–20	3–1	Report
April 17	1:00 pm		Richmond		Billiken Sports Center	**Canceled (COVID-19 protocols)**					11–20	3–1	Report
April 17	4:00 pm		Richmond		Billiken Sports Center	**Canceled (COVID-19 protocols)**					11–20	3–1	Report
April 18	1:00 pm		Richmond		Billiken Sports Center	**Canceled (COVID-19 protocols)**					11–20	3–1	Report
April 21	3:00 pm		Fontbonne*		Billiken Sports Center	**W** 13–0	**Boyer (2–2)**	Gunther (0–1)	—	44	12–20	—	Stats
April 23	5:00 pm	ESPN3	at Bradley*		Dozer Park; Peoria, Illinois	**L** 4–18	Catton (3–1)	**Finkleburg (0–7)**	—	192	12–21	—	Stats
April 24	2:00 pm	ESPN3	at Bradley*		Dozer Park	**W** 9–6	**Fremion (2–0)**	Hamilton (3–1)	**Patel (2)**	171	13–21	—	Stats
April 25	1:00 pm	ESPN3	at Bradley*		Dozer Park	**L** 3–13	Gosswein (3–0)	**Youngbrandt (2–5)**	—	198	13–22	—	Stats
April 30	3:00 pm	ESPN+	at George Washington		Barcroft Park; Arlington, Virginia	**L** 7–10	Kahler (2–0)	**Sheehan (2–2)**	Kuncl (6)	50	13–23	3–2	Stats

May (4–8)
Date	Time (CT)	TV	Opponent	Rank	Stadium	Score	Win	Loss	Save	Attendance	Overall	Atlantic 10	Sources
May 1	1:00 pm	ESPN+	at George Washington		Barcroft Park	**W** 7–2 ^{(8)}	**Harris (4–2)**	Cohen (4–2)	—	50	14–23	4–2	Stats
May 1	4:00 pm	ESPN+	at George Washington		Barcroft Park	**L** 7–14	Edwards (4–2)	**Townsend (1–1)**	—	50	14–24	4–3	Stats
May 2	12:00 pm	ESPN+	at George Washington		Barcroft Park	**W** 9–7	**Patel (1–0)**	McGinnis (2–3)	**Fremion (1)**	50	15–24	5–3	Stats
May 7	3:00 pm	ESPN+	No. 27 VCU		Billiken Sports Center	**L** 6–14	Delane (2–0)	**Harris (4–3)**	—	85	15–25	5–4	Stats
May 8	1:00 pm	ESPN+	No. 27 VCU		Billiken Sports Center	**L** 4–19	Davis (8–1)	**Fremion (2–1)**	—	60	15–26	5–5	Stats
May 8	4:00 pm	ESPN+	No. 27 VCU		Billiken Sports Center	**L** 8–9 ^{(10)}	Ellis (5–1)	**Surin (0–1)**	—	55	15–27	5–6	Stats
May 9	1:00 pm	ESPN+	No. 27 VCU		Billiken Sports Center	**L** 5–16	Masloff (1–0)	**Youngbrandt (2–6)**	—	45	15–28	5–7	Stats
May 11	6:00 pm	ESPN+	SIUE*		Billiken Sports Center	**W** 10–7	**Sheehan (3–2)**	Waterhouse (1–3)	**Balandis (1)**	65	16–28	—	Stats
May 13	6:00 pm		Eastern Illinois*		Billiken Sports Center	**Canceled (COVID-19 protocols)**					16–28	—	Report
May 15	1:00 pm		at Eastern Illinois*		Monier Field; Charleston, Illinois	**Canceled (COVID-19 protocols)**					16–28	—	Report
May 15	4:00 pm		at Eastern Illinois*		Monier Field	**Canceled (COVID-19 protocols)**					16–28	—	Report
May 20	3:00 pm	ESPN+	Davidson		Billiken Sports Center	**L** 3–11	Biederman (5–1)	**Harris (4–4)**	Schomberg (1)	50	16–29	5–8	Stats
May 21	1:00 pm	ESPN+	Davidson		Billiken Sports Center	**W** 7–5	**Youngbrandt (3–6)**	Fenton (2–8)	**Patel (3)**	60	17–29	6–8	Stats
May 21	4:00 pm	ESPN+	Davidson		Billiken Sports Center	**L** 1–4	Levy (5–3)	**Finkleberg (0–8)**	Devos (8)	75	17–30	6–9	Stats
May 22	1:00 pm	ESPN+	Davidson		Billiken Sports Center	**L** 3–6	Walker (2–1)	**Fremion (2–2)**	Peaden (1)	150	17–31	6–10	Stats
