= 2021 Davidson Wildcats baseball team =

American college baseball season

2021 Davidson Wildcats baseball
- Conference: Atlantic 10 Conference
- Record: 27–24 (11–13 A-10)
- Head coach: Rucker Taylor (3rd season)
- Assistant coaches: Ryan Munger (8th season); Parker Bangs (3rd season); Aaron Lesiak (1st season)
- Home stadium: Wilson Field

2021 Atlantic 10 Conference baseball standings
	Conf.						Overall
Team	W		L		T	PCT	W		L		T	PCT
North
Rhode Island ^{x}‍‍‍	14	–	6	–	0	.700	28	–	26	–	1	.518
Saint Joseph's ‍‍‍	15	–	9	–	0	.625	21	–	19	–	0	.525
La Salle ‍‍‍	15	–	9	–	0	.625	32	–	21	–	0	.604
Fordham ‍‍‍	11	–	9	–	0	.550	24	–	19	–	0	.558
St. Bonaventure ‍‍‍	6	–	14	–	0	.300	7	–	24	–	0	.226
UMass ‍‍‍	3	–	16	–	0	.158	13	–	29	–	0	.310
South
VCU ^{x}‍‍‡‍^{y}	13	–	3	–	0	.813	38	–	16	–	0	.704
Dayton ‍‍‍	12	–	4	–	0	.750	25	–	27	–	0	.481
George Washington ‍‍‍	14	–	10	–	0	.583	26	–	19	–	0	.578
Davidson ‍‍‍	11	–	13	–	0	.458	27	–	24	–	0	.529
Saint Louis ‍‍‍	6	–	10	–	0	.375	17	–	31	–	0	.354
Richmond ‍‍‍	5	–	11	–	0	.313	19	–	17	–	0	.528
George Mason ‍‍‍	7	–	17	–	0	.292	14	–	29	–	0	.326
† – Conference champion ‡ – Tournament champion y – Invited to the NCAA tournament As of June 5, 2021; Rankings from D1Baseball

The 2021 Davidson Wildcats baseball team represented Davidson College during the 2021 NCAA Division I baseball season. It was the program's 120th baseball season, and their 6th season the Atlantic 10 Conference. The regular season began on February 20 and concluded on May 22, 2021.

Davidson finished the season with a 27–24 record.

== Preseason ==
=== A10 coaches' poll ===
The Atlantic 10 baseball coaches' poll was released on February 18, 2021. Davidson was picked finish fourth.

Coaches' Poll
Predicted finish	Team	Points
1	VCU	151 (4)
2	Fordham	149 (4)
3	Dayton	146 (4)
4	Davidson	117
5	Saint Louis	114 (1)
6	Richmond	109
7	Rhode Island	103
8	George Washington	74
9	Saint Joseph's	71
10	George Mason	46
11	La Salle	40
12	St. Bonaventure	32
13	UMass	31

== Roster ==
2021 Davidson Wildcats baseball roster
Pitchers: 9 - Pete Bloomberg - Senior; 11 - Jake Biederman - Junior; 14 - Blake Hely - Junior; 17 - Will Schomberg - Sophomore; 20 - Alex Fento - Junior; 21 - Nolan DeVos - Sophomore; 23 - Nick Shedleski - Freshman; 26 - Ryan Kutz - Sophomore; 28 - Jacob Walker - Senior; 30 - Eddie Shores - Sophomore; 31 - Danny Rosenfield - Freshman; 36 - Ryan Feczko - Freshman; 32 - Liam Smith - Freshman; 34 - Gabe Levy - Junior; 35 - Jacob Peaden - Sophomore; 42 - Bennett Flynn - Sophomore; 43 - Micah Baermann - Freshman	Catchers: 5 - Michael Carico - Freshman; 6 - Garrett Browder - Sophomore; 10 - John Hosmer - Junior; Infielders: 7 - Jacob Hinderleider - Sophomore; 8 - Matthew Gravely - Junior; 12 - Joe Haney - Freshman; 16 - Alex Fedje-Johnson - (redshirt) Senior; 18 - Jake Dunagan - Freshman; 24 - Jake Wilhoit - Freshman	Outfielders: 4 - Tyler Douglas - Freshman; 13 - Ruben Fontes - Senior; 27 - Parker Nolan - Junior; 33 - Trevor Candelaria - Junior; Utility: 1 - Anthony Mase - Sophomore; 10 - John Hosmer - Junior; 19 - Ryan Wilson - Freshman; 22 - Brian Craven - Junior; 29 - Henry Koehler - Sophomore; 39 - A.J. Pabst - Sophomore; 41 - Hunter Anderson - Sophomore

== Game log ==
2021 Davidson Wildcats baseball game log
Regular season (27–24)

February (4–2)
Date	Time (ET)	TV	Opponent	Rank	Stadium	Score	Win	Loss	Save	Attendance	Overall	Atlantic 10	Sources
February 19	6:00 pm		Mount St. Mary's*		Wilson Field; Davidson, North Carolina	Canceled (inclement weather)					0–0	—	Report
February 20	1:00 pm		Mount St. Mary's*		Wilson Field	Canceled (inclement weather)					0–0	—	Report
February 20	6:00 pm	ESPN+	Morehead State*		Wilson Field	W 14–8	Devos (1–0)	Bettio (0–1)	Levy (1)	39	1–0	—	Report
February 21	1:00 pm	ACCNX	at No. 13 NC State*		Doak Field; Raleigh, North Carolina	L 3–13	Johnston (1–0)	Fenton (0–1)	—	198	1–1	—	Report
February 21	4:45 pm	ACCN+	at No. 13 NC State*		Doak Field	L 4–6	Klyman (1–0)	Flynn (0–1)	—	198	1–2	—	Report
February 27	2:00 pm		Toledo*		Wilson Field	W 8–1	Levy (1–0)	Meyers (0–2)	Devos (1)	50	2–2	—	Report
February 27	5:00 pm		Toledo*		Wilson Field	W 12–2	Hely (1–0)	Jefferson (0–2)	—	50	3–2	—	Report
February 28	1:00 pm		Toledo*		Wilson Field	W 16–14	Biederman (1–0)	Boyle (0–1)	—	49	4–2	—	Report

March (9–7)
Date	Time (ET)	TV	Opponent	Rank	Stadium	Score	Win	Loss	Save	Attendance	Overall	Atlantic 10	Sources
March 2	4:00 pm		at No. 25 Duke*		Durham Bulls Athletic Park; Durham, North Carolina	L 3–7	Nifong (1–1)	Peaden (0–1)	—	0	4–3	—	Report
March 5	4:30 pm	ESPN+	at Coastal Carolina*; Baseball at the Beach		Springs Brooks Stadium; Conway, South Carolina	L 5–15	Maton (2–1)	Levy (1–1)	—	1,000	4–4	—	Report
March 6	11:00 am		vs. UConn*; Baseball at the Beach		Springs Brooks Stadium	W 4–3	Hely (2–0)	Haus (0–1)	Devos (2)	1,000	5–4	—	Report
March 7	11:00 am		vs. Miami (OH)*; Baseball at the Beach		Springs Brooks Stadium	L 3–11	Bosma (1–0)	Fenton (0–2)	—	1,000	5–5	—	Report
March 12	5:00 pm	ESPN+	at The Citadel*		Riley Park; Charleston, South Carolina	L 0–2	Cooper (1–0)	Levy (0–2)	Beckley (1)	237	5–6	—	Report
March 13	2:00 pm	ESPN+	at The Citadel*		Riley Park	L 0–19	Reeves (2–0)	Hely (2–1)	—	252	5–7	—	Report
March 14	1:00 pm	ESPN+	at The Citadel*		Riley Park	L 4–8	Todd (1–2)	Fenton (0–3)	Beckley (2)	421	5–8	—	Report
March 16	7:00 pm		at No. 16 South Carolina*		Founders Park; Columbia, South Carolina	W 9–4	Schomberg (1–0)	Luensmann (0–1)	—	1,938	6–8	—	Report
March 19	6:00 pm	ESPN+	Spring Hill*		Wilson Field	W 7–2	Levy (2–2)	Fell (0–2)	—	149	7–8	—	Report
March 20	5:00 pm		Spring Hill*		Wilson Field	W 5–1	Hely (3–1)	Ingram (1–2)	—	49	8–8	—	Report
March 21	11:30 am		Spring Hill*		Wilson Field	W 8–5	Devos (2–0)	Baxley (0–2)	—	114	9–8	—	Report
March 23	6:30 p.m.	ESPN+	at Wofford*		Russell C. King Field; Spartanburg, South Carolina	L 1–5	Stratton (1–0)	Walker (0–1)	Rhadans (3)	141	9–9	—	Report
March 26	6:00 pm	ESPN+	Seton Hall*		Wilson Field	W 6–5	Biederman (2–0)	Cinnella (1–1)	—	50	10–9	—	Report
March 27	6:30 pm		Seton Hall*		Wilson Field	W 2–1	Devos (3–0)	Patten (0–2)	—	50	11–9	—	Report
March 28	11:00 am	ESPN+	Seton Hall*		Wilson Field	W 3–2	Walker (1–1)	Panzini (0–1)	Devos (3)	50	12–9	—	Report
March 30	6:00 pm	WGNC	vs. Wofford*		Atrium Health Ballpark; Kannapolis, North Carolina	W 7–6	Peaden (1–1)	Stratton (1–1)	Devos (4)	1,307	13–9	—	Report

April (7–10)
Date	Time (ET)	TV	Opponent	Rank	Stadium	Score	Win	Loss	Save	Attendance	Overall	Atlantic 10	Sources
April 1	6:00 pm		North Alabama*		Wilson Field	W 8–4	Levy (3–2)	Davidson (1–3)	Devos (5)	50	14–9	—	Report
April 2	6:00 pm		North Alabama*		Wilson Field	W 6–4	Peaden (2–1)	Best (1–5)	—	50	15–9	—	Report
April 3	2:00 pm		North Alabama*		Wilson Field	W 5–0	Fenton (1–3)	Moore (0–4)	—	50	16–9	—	Report
April 6	3:00 pm		at Presbyterian*		Presbyterian Baseball Complex; Clinton, South Carolina	Canceled (scheduling conflict)					16–9	—	Report
April 9	5:30 pm	ESPN+	Dayton		Wilson Field	W 2–1 ^{(7)}	Levy (4–2)	Wolfe (4–2)	—	50	17–9	1–0	Report
April 9	7:50 pm		Dayton		Wilson Field	W 10–8	Peaden (3–1)	Olson (0–7)	Devos (6)	50	18–9	2–0	Report
April 10	12:30 pm		Dayton		Wilson Field	W 12–9	Hely (4–1)	Pletka (1–3)	Devos (7)	50	19–9	3–0	Report
April 11	1:00 pm		Dayton		Wilson Field	L 5–11	Olson (1–7)	Fenton (1–4)	—	50	19–10	3–1	Report
April 16	6:30 pm		at VCU		The Diamond; Richmond, Virginia	L 3–14	Webb (2–1)	Levy (4–3)	Griffin (1)	233	19–11	3–2	Report
April 17	2:00 pm		at VCU		The Diamond	L 8–9	Davis (7–1)	Peaden (3–2)	—	354	19–12	3–3	Report
April 17	5:00 pm		at VCU		The Diamond	L 1–5	Furman (1–0)	Peaden (3–3)	Chenier (4)	354	19–13	3–4	Report
April 18	1:00 pm		at VCU		The Diamond	L 1–3	Serrano (2–4)	Fentons (1–5)	Ellis (1)	218	19–14	3–5	Report
April 23	5:00 pm		George Washington		Wilson Field	L 2–4	Pfluger (1–1)	Peaden (3–4)	Kuncl (4)	0	19–15	3–6	Report
April 23	8:00 pm		George Washington		Wilson Field	L 2–10	Cohen (4–1)	Hely (4–2)	—	0	19–16	3–7	Report
April 25	12:00 pm		George Washington		Wilson Field	L 1–8	Edwards (3–2)	Fenton (1–6)	—	0	19–17	3–8	Report
April 25	3:00 pm		George Washington		Wilson Field	W 5–4	Biederman (3–0)	Kuncl (2–1)	—	0	20–17	4–8	Report
April 27	6:00 pm		at Wake Forest*		David F. Couch Ballpark; Winston-Salem, North Carolina	L 12–17	Minacci (1–1)	Peaden (3–5)	—	328	20–18	—	Report
April 30	2:00 pm		at Richmond		Malcolm U. Pitt Field; Tuckahoe, Virginia	L 4–6	Mathes (2–0)	Craven (0–1)	—	0	20–19	4–9	Report

May (7–5)
Date	Time (ET)	TV	Opponent	Rank	Stadium	Score	Win	Loss	Save	Attendance	Overall	Atlantic 10	Sources
May 1	12:00 pm		at Richmond		Malcolm U. Pitt Field	W 4–2	Devos (4–0)	Schulefand (4–1)	—	250	21–19	5–9	Report
May 1	3:00 pm		at Richmond		Malcolm U. Pitt Field	L 1–3	Wyatt (2–1)	Biederman (3–1)	—	250	21–20	5–10	Report
May 2	12:00 pm		at Richmond		Malcolm U. Pitt Field	W 17–7	Fenton (2–6)	Willitts (0–1)	—	140	22–20	6–10	Report
May 4	6:00 pm		Presbyterian*		Wilson Field	Canceled (scheduling conflict)					22–20	—	Report
May 13	6:00 pm		George Mason		Wilson Field	L 3–5	Stoudemire (2–9)	Fenton (2–7)	Henson (1)	50	22–21	6–11	Report
May 14	1:00 pm		George Mason		Wilson Field	W 5–4	Devos (5–0)	Henson (0–2)	—	50	23–21	7–11	Report
May 14	4:00 pm		George Mason		Wilson Field	W 8–7	Biederman (4–1)	Nielsen (0–1)	—	75	24–21	8–11	Report
May 15	1:00 pm		George Mason		Wilson Field	L 4–10	Kaiser (1–2)	Bloomberg (0–1)	—	N/A	24–22	8–12	Report
May 18	4:00 pm		Duke*		Wilson Field	L 2–18	Seidl (3–0)	Flynn (0–2)	—	N/A	24–23	—	Report
May 20	4:00 pm		at Saint Louis		Billiken Sports Center; St. Louis, Missouri	W 11–3	Biederman (5–1)	Harris (4–4)	Schomberg (1)	50	25–23	9–12	Report
May 21	2:00 pm		at Saint Louis		Billiken Sports Center	L 5–7	Youngbrandt (3–6)	Fenton (2–8)	Patel (3)	65	25–24	9–13	Report
May 21	5:00 pm		at Saint Louis		Billiken Sports Center	W 4–1	Levy (5–3)	Finkleberg (0–8)	Devos (8)	75	26–24	10–13	Report
May 22	2:00 pm		at Saint Louis		Billiken Sports Center	W 6–3	Walker (2–1)	Fremion (2–2)	Peaden (1)	150	27–24	11–13	Report

Schedule source:

*Rankings are based on the team's current ranking in the D1Baseball poll.

== Rankings ==
Ranking movements Legend: — = Not ranked
	Week																		
Poll	Pre	1	2	3	4	5	6	7	8	9	10	11	12	13	14	15	16	17	Final
Coaches'	—	—*	—	—	—	—	—	—	—	—	—	—	—	—	—	—	—	—	—
Baseball America	—	—	—	—	—	—	—	—	—	—	—	—	—	—	—	—	—	—	—
Collegiate Baseball^	—	—	—	—	—	—	—	—	—	—	—	—	—	—	—	—	—	—	—
NCBWA†	—	—	—	—	—	—	—	—	—	—	—	—	—	—	—	—	—	—	—
D1Baseball	—	—	—	—	—	—	—	—	—	—	—	—	—	—	—	—	—	—	—

^ Collegiate Baseball ranked 40 teams in their preseason poll, but only ranked 30 teams weekly during the season.
† NCBWA ranks 30 teams in their preseason poll, but only ranks 25 teams weekly during the season.
* A new poll was not released for this week, so for comparison purposes, the previous week's ranking is inserted in this week's slot.

== Honors ==
Atlantic 10 Conference Weekly Awards
Player	Award	Date Awarded	Ref.
Trevor Candelaria	Player of the Week	March 1, 2021	
Gabe Levy	Pitcher of the Week	March 1, 2021	
Parker Nolan	Player of the Week	March 22, 2021	
Ryan Wilson	Rookie of the Week	April 5, 2021	
Ruben Fontes	Player of the Week	April 12, 2021	

All-A10
Player	Position	Team
Trevor Candelaria	OF	1
Nolan Devos	RP	1
