= 2021 Rhode Island Rams baseball team =

2021 Rhode Island Rams baseball

Atlantic 10 Northern Division champion
- Conference: Atlantic 10 Conference
- Record: 28–26–1 (13–6 A10)
- Head coach: Raphael Cerrato (7th season)
- Home stadium: Bill Beck Field

2021 Atlantic 10 Conference baseball standings
	Conf.						Overall
Team	W		L		T	PCT	W		L		T	PCT
North
Rhode Island ^{x}‍‍‍	14	–	6	–	0	.700	28	–	26	–	1	.518
Saint Joseph's ‍‍‍	15	–	9	–	0	.625	21	–	19	–	0	.525
La Salle ‍‍‍	15	–	9	–	0	.625	32	–	21	–	0	.604
Fordham ‍‍‍	11	–	9	–	0	.550	24	–	19	–	0	.558
St. Bonaventure ‍‍‍	6	–	14	–	0	.300	7	–	24	–	0	.226
UMass ‍‍‍	3	–	16	–	0	.158	13	–	29	–	0	.310
South
VCU ^{x}‍‍‡‍^{y}	13	–	3	–	0	.813	38	–	16	–	0	.704
Dayton ‍‍‍	12	–	4	–	0	.750	25	–	27	–	0	.481
George Washington ‍‍‍	14	–	10	–	0	.583	26	–	19	–	0	.578
Davidson ‍‍‍	11	–	13	–	0	.458	27	–	24	–	0	.529
Saint Louis ‍‍‍	6	–	10	–	0	.375	17	–	31	–	0	.354
Richmond ‍‍‍	5	–	11	–	0	.313	19	–	17	–	0	.528
George Mason ‍‍‍	7	–	17	–	0	.292	14	–	29	–	0	.326
† – Conference champion ‡ – Tournament champion y – Invited to the NCAA tournament As of June 5, 2021; Rankings from D1Baseball

The 2021 Rhode Island Rams baseball team represented the University of Rhode Island during the 2021 NCAA Division I baseball season. The Rams played their home games at Bill Beck Field as a member of the Atlantic 10 Conference They were led by head coach Raphael Cerrato, in his seventh year as head coach.

The Rams won the Northern Division championship, obtaining a record of 28–26–1 (13–6) before losing in the semifinal round of the 2021 Atlantic 10 Conference baseball tournament. They did not earn a bid into the NCAA tournament.

== Previous season ==
The 2020 Rhode Island Rams baseball team notched a 8–5 (0–0) regular-season record. The season prematurely ended on March 12, 2020, due to concerns over the COVID-19 pandemic.

== Game log ==
2021 Rhode Island Rams baseball game log (28–26–1)
Regular Season (27–24–1)
February (2–4)

Date	Time (ET)	TV	Opponent	Rank	Stadium	Score	Win	Loss	Save	Attendance	Overall	A10	
February 19	7:00 p.m.	ESPN+	at No. 13 East Carolina*		Clark–LeClair Stadium; Greenville, North Carolina	**L** 2–3^{10}	Colmore (1–0)	**Morrison (0–1)**	—	100	0–1	—	Report
February 20	2:00 p.m.	ESPN+	at No. 13 East Carolina*		Clark–LeClair Stadium	**L** 1–7	Kuchmaner (1–0)	**Webb (0–1)**	—	182	0–2	—	Report
February 21	1:00 p.m.	ESPN+	at No. 13 East Carolina*		Clark–LeClair Stadium	**L** 4–12	Beal (1–0)	**Janglos (0–1)**	—	166	0–3	—	Report
February 26	3:00 p.m.	CUSA.tv	at Old Dominion*		Bud Metheny Baseball Complex; Norfolk, Virginia	**W** 6–4	**Fernandez (1–0)**	Rodriguez (0–1)	—	187	1–3	—	Report
February 27	3:00 p.m.	CUSA.tv	at Old Dominion*		Bud Metheny Baseball Complex	**W** 6–5	**Morrison (1–1)**	Scheffler (0–1)	—	202	2–3	—	Report
February 28	1:00 p.m.	CUSA.tv	at Old Dominion*		Bud Metheny Baseball Complex	**L** 3–15	Moore (2–0)	**Janglos (0–2)**	—	192	2–4	—	Report

March (8–6–1)

Date	Time (ET)	TV	Opponent	Rank	Stadium	Score	Win	Loss	Save	Attendance	Overall	A10	
March 3	3:00 p.m.	ACCNX	at No. 22 Boston College*		Pellagrini Diamond; Boston, Massachusetts	**L** 4–6	Ryan (2–0)	**French (0–1)**	Walsh (2)	0	2–5	—	Box Score; Recap
March 6	12:00 p.m.		UMass Lowell*		Bill Beck Field; Kingston, Rhode Island	**W** 3–1	**Twitchell (1–0)**	Duffley (0–2)	**Robinson (1)**	0	3–5	—	Box Score; Recap
March 7	11:00 a.m.		UMass Lowell*		Bill Beck Field	**W** 4–0	**Webb (1–0)**	Draper (0–1)	—	0	4–5	—	Box Score; Recap
March 8	3:00 p.m.		UMass Lowell*		Bill Beck Field	**W** 5–2	**Morrison (2–1)**	Seguin (0–1)	**French (1)**	0	5–5	—	Box Score; Recap
March 9	2:00 p.m.		Bryant*		Bill Beck Field	Canceled (COVID-19 protocols)					5–5	—	Recap
March 12	2:00 p.m.		Bryant*		Bill Beck Field	Canceled (COVID-19 protocols)					5–5	—	Recap
March 13	1:00 p.m.		Bryant*		Bill Beck Field	**W** 7–0	**Twitchell (2–0)**	Mattison (1–2)	—	0	6–5	—	Box Score; Recap
March 14	1:00 p.m.		Bryant*		Bill Beck Field	**W** 6–4	**Fernandez (2–0)**	Gould (1–1)	—	0	7–5	—	Box Score; Recap
March 17	12:00 p.m.		Sacred Heart*		Bill Beck Field	**W** 7–3	**Moxey (1–0)**	McDowel (0–1)	—	0	8–5	—	Box Score; Recap
March 19	1:00 p.m.		at Charlotte*		Truist Field; Charlotte, North Carolina	**L** 1–2^{10}	Hughes (2–0)	**French (0–2)**	—	0	8–6	—	Box Score; Recap
March 20	4:30 p.m.		at Charlotte*		Truist Field	**W** 6–3	**Webb (2–0)**	Starnes (0–1)	**Fernandez (1)**	1,734	9–6	—	Box Score; Recap
March 21	12:00 p.m.		at Charlotte*		Truist Field	**L** 3–6	**Giesting (1–0)**	**Seprosky (0–1)**	Boss (1)	121	9–7	—	Box Score; Recap
March 24	3:00 p.m.		at Bryant*		Conaty Park; Smithfield, Rhode Island	**T** 7–7^{10}	—	—	—	150	9–7–1	—	Box Score; Recap
March 26	3:00 p.m.		at UConn*		Elliot Ballpark; Storrs, Connecticut	**L** 6–9	Haus (1–2)	**Brutti (0–1)**	Wurster (3)	176	9–8–1	—	Box Score; Recap
March 27	4:30 p.m.		at UConn*		Elliot Ballpark	**L** 2–3^{13}	Willis (1–0)	**Fernandez (2–1)**	—	213	9–9–1	—	Box Score; Recap
March 28	1:00 p.m.		at UConn*		Elliot Ballpark	**W** 6–4	**Levesque (1–0)**	Dunlop (0–1)	—	213	10–9–1	—	Box Score; Recap
March 30	3:05 p.m.	ESPN+	at Army*		Doubleday Field; West Point, New York	**L** 2–3	Gresham (2–0)	**Brutti (0–2)**	—	93	10–10–1	—	Box Score; Recap

April (7–7)

Date	Time (ET)	TV	Opponent	Rank	Stadium	Score	Win	Loss	Save	Attendance	Overall	A10	
April 2	3:00 p.m.		Hofstra*		Bill Beck Field	**W** 12–11	**Levesque (2–0)**	Mott (0–2)	—	30	11–10–1	—	Box Score; Recap
April 3	11:00 a.m.		at Hofstra*		University Field; Hempstead, New York	**L** 1–3^{8}	Mundy (1–0)	**Seprosky (0–2)**	—	36	11–11–1	—	Box Score; Recap
April 3	3:30 p.m.		at Hofstra*		University Field	**L** 4–5^{7}	Sujak (1–0)	**Picone (0–1)**	Mott (1)	36	11–12–1	—	Box Score; Recap
April 7	3:00 p.m.		Bryant*		Bill Beck Field	**L** 7–10	Wainer (1–0)	**Morrison (2–2)**	Gould (2)	20	11–13–1	—	Box Score; Recap
April 9	3:00 p.m.	ESPN+	at La Salle		Hank DeVincent Field; Philadelphia, Pennsylvania	**L** 5–8	Kennedy (2–0)	**Fernandez (2–2)**	—		11–14–1	0–1	Box Score; Recap
April 10	11:00 a.m.	ESPN+	at La Salle		Hank DeVincent Field	**W** 4–2^{8}	**Webb (3–0)**	Elissalt (3–1)	—	40	12–14–1	1–1	Box Score; Recap
April 10	2:00 p.m.	ESPN+	at La Salle		Hank DeVincent Field	**W** 12–6^{7}	**Picone (1–1)**	Morales (1–2)	—	40	13–14–1	2–1	Box Score; Recap
April 11	2:00 p.m.	ESPN+	at La Salle		Hank DeVincent Field	**L** 3–7	Yablonski (1–1)	**Levesque (2–1)**	Kennedy (1)	40	13–15–1	2–2	Box Score; Recap
April 13	3:00 p.m.		Brown*		Bill Beck Field	Canceled (COVID-19 protocols)					13–15–1	—	Recap
April 16	3:00 p.m.	ESPN+	Fordham		Bill Beck Field	Canceled (COVID-19 protocols)					13–15–1	2–2	Recap
April 17	12:00 p.m.	ESPN+	Fordham		Bill Beck Field	Canceled (COVID-19 protocols)					13–15–1	2–2	Recap
April 17	3:00 p.m.	ESPN+	Fordham		Bill Beck Field	Canceled (COVID-19 protocols)					13–15–1	2–2	Recap
April 18	12:00 p.m.	ESPN+	Fordham		Bill Beck Field	Canceled (COVID-19 protocols)					13–15–1	2–2	Recap
April 20	3:00 p.m.		Northeastern*		Bill Beck Field	Canceled (COVID-19 protocols)					13–15–1	—	Recap
April 21	3:00 p.m.	ACCN	at Boston College*		Pellagrini Diamond	**W** 6–4	**Janglos (1–2)**	Vetrano (0–2)	**Levesque (1)**	75	14–15–1	—	Box Score; Recap
April 23	12:00 p.m.	ESPN+	UMass		Bill Beck Field	**W** 8–7^{10}	**Fernandez (3–2)**	Henry (2–1)	—	20	15–15–1	3–2	Box Score; Recap
April 23	3:00 p.m.	ESPN+	UMass		Bill Beck Field	**L** 2–11^{7}	Steele (3–5)	**Picone (1–2)**	—	20	15–16–1	3–3	Box Score; Recap
April 24	12:00 p.m.	ESPN+	UMass		Bill Beck Field	**W** 7–3^{7}	**Webb (4–0)**	Dalton (0–3)	—	30	16–16–1	4–3	Box Score; Recap
April 24	3:00 p.m.	ESPN+	UMass		Bill Beck Field	**W** 10–8	**Levesque (3–1)**	Given (1–3)	—	40	17–16–1	5–3	Box Score; Recap
April 30	9:35 p.m.	P12N	at Arizona State*		Phoenix Municipal Stadium; Phoenix, Arizona	**L** 6–9	Corrigan (1–1)	**Twitchell (2–1)**	Thornton (1)	1,740	17–17–1	—	Box Score; Recap

May (10–7)

Date	Time (ET)	TV	Opponent	Rank	Stadium	Score	Win	Loss	Save	Attendance	Overall	A10	
May 1	8:35 p.m.	P12N	at Arizona State*		Phoenix Municipal Stadium	**L** 6–8	Glenn (5–1)	**Webb (4–1)**	Levine (5)	1,549	17–18–1	—	Box Score; Recap
May 2	2:35 p.m.	P12N	at Arizona State*		Phoenix Municipal Stadium	**L** 13–14	Osman (2–2)	**Morrison (2–3)**	Corrigan (2)	1,279	17–19–1	—	Box Score; Recap
May 7	4:00 p.m.	ESPN+	at St. Bonaventure		Fred Handler Park; Olean, New York	**W** 8–3					18–19–1	6–3	Box Score; Recap
May 8	12:00 p.m.	ESPN+	at St. Bonaventure		Fred Handler Park	**W** 7–1^{7}					19–19–1	7–3	Box Score; Recap
May 8	3:00 p.m.	ESPN+	at St. Bonaventure		Fred Handler Park	**L** 2–3^{7}					19–20–1	7–4	Box Score; Recap
May 9	10:30 a.m.	ESPN+	at St. Bonaventure		Fred Handler Park	**W** 8–4					20–20–1	8–4	Box Score; Recap
May 11	1:30 p.m.		Army*		Bill Beck Field	**L** 1–8^{7}					20–21–1	—	Box Score; Recap
May 11	4:30 p.m.		Army*		Bill Beck Field	**W** 9–5^{7}					21–21–1	—	Box Score; Recap
May 14	3:00 p.m.		Saint Joseph's		Bill Beck Field	**L** 5–6					21–22–1	8–5	Box Score; Recap
May 15	12:00 p.m.		Saint Joseph's		Bill Beck Field	**W** 7–3^{7}					22–22–1	9–5	Box Score; Recap
May 15	3:00 p.m.		Saint Joseph's		Bill Beck Field	**W** 8–7^{7}					23–22–1	10–5	Box Score; Recap
May 16	12:00 p.m.		Saint Joseph's		Bill Beck Field	**L** 3–6					23–23–1	10–6	Box Score; Recap
May 18	3:00 p.m.		UConn*		Bill Beck Field	**L** 6–15	Crawford (1–1)	**Diaz (0–2)**	—	50	23–24–1	—	Box Score; Recap
May 20	3:00 p.m.	ESPN+	at UMass		Earl Lorden Field; Amherst, Massachusetts	**W** 17–6^{8}	**Twitchell (4–1)**	Given (2–4)	**Moxey (1)**	80	24–24–1	11–6	Box Score; Recap
May 21	12:00 p.m.	ESPN+	at UMass		Earl Lorden Field	**W** 7–2^{7}	**Webb (7–1)**	Steele (3–7)	—	80	25–24–1	12–6	Box Score; Recap
May 21	3:00 p.m.	ESPN+	at UMass		Earl Lorden Field	**W** 7–5^{7}	**Cherry (1–0)**	Aronson (0–1)	**Janglos (1)**	80	26–24–1	13–6	Box Score; Recap
May 22	12:00 p.m.	ESPN+	at UMass		Earl Lorden Field	**W** 16–1	**Levesque (5–2)**	Bergeron (0–1)	—	100	27–24–1	14–6	Box Score; Recap

Post-Season (1–2)
Atlantic 10 Tournament (1–2)

Date	Time (ET)	TV	Opponent	Rank	Stadium	Score	Win	Loss	Save	Attendance	Overall	Postseason	
May 27	3:30 pm	ESPN+	vs. (3) Dayton; Quarterfinals	(2)	The Diamond	**W** 8–2	**Twitchell (5–1)**	Wolfe (4–5)	**French (2)**	821	28–24–1	1–0	Box Score; Report
May 28	11:00 am	ESPN+	at (1) No. 28 VCU; Semifinals	(2)	The Diamond	**L** 4–10	Serrano (4–4)	**Janglos (2–3)**	—	678	28–25–1	1–1	
May 28	2:30 pm	ESPN+	vs. (2) Dayton; Losers Final	(2)	The Diamond	**L** 1–3	Wagner (1–2)	**Cherry (1–1)**	Longbrake (2)	678	28–26–1	1–2	

Legend: = Win = Loss = Tie = Canceled Bold = Rhode Island team member * Non-conference game • Schedule source • Rankings based on the teams' current ranking in the D1Baseball poll

== Awards and honors ==
Atlantic 10 Conference Weekly Awards
Player	Award	Date awarded	Ref.
Sonny Ulliana	Player of the Week	April 26, 2021	
Addison Kopack	Rookie of the Week	April 26, 2021	
Xavier Vargas	Player of the Week	May 3, 2021	

All-A10
Player	Position	Team
Austin White	OF	1
Mike Webb	RHP	1
