= 2021 Atlantic 10 Conference baseball tournament =

American college baseball tournament

- Teams: 4
- Format: Double-elimination
- Finals site: The Diamond; Richmond, Virginia
- Champions: VCU (2nd title)
- Winning coach: Shawn Stiffler (2nd title)
- MVP: Hunter Vey (VCU)
- Television: ESPN+

2021 Atlantic 10 Conference baseball standings
	Conf.						Overall
Team	W		L		T	PCT	W		L		T	PCT
North
Rhode Island ^{x}‍‍‍	14	–	6	–	0	.700	28	–	26	–	1	.518
Saint Joseph's ‍‍‍	15	–	9	–	0	.625	21	–	19	–	0	.525
La Salle ‍‍‍	15	–	9	–	0	.625	32	–	21	–	0	.604
Fordham ‍‍‍	11	–	9	–	0	.550	24	–	19	–	0	.558
St. Bonaventure ‍‍‍	6	–	14	–	0	.300	7	–	24	–	0	.226
UMass ‍‍‍	3	–	16	–	0	.158	13	–	29	–	0	.310
South
VCU ^{x}‍‍‡‍^{y}	13	–	3	–	0	.813	38	–	16	–	0	.704
Dayton ‍‍‍	12	–	4	–	0	.750	25	–	27	–	0	.481
George Washington ‍‍‍	14	–	10	–	0	.583	26	–	19	–	0	.578
Davidson ‍‍‍	11	–	13	–	0	.458	27	–	24	–	0	.529
Saint Louis ‍‍‍	6	–	10	–	0	.375	17	–	31	–	0	.354
Richmond ‍‍‍	5	–	11	–	0	.313	19	–	17	–	0	.528
George Mason ‍‍‍	7	–	17	–	0	.292	14	–	29	–	0	.326
† – Conference champion ‡ – Tournament champion y – Invited to the NCAA tournament As of June 5, 2021; Rankings from D1Baseball

The 2021 Atlantic 10 Conference baseball tournament was held from May 27 through 29 at The Diamond in Richmond, Virginia, hosted by Virginia Commonwealth University. The annual tournament determined the tournament champion of Division I Atlantic 10 Conference in college baseball for the 2021 season. The tournament champion will then earn the conference's automatic bid to the 2021 NCAA Division I baseball tournament.

== Tournament ==
=== Bracket ===
Thursday, May 27
1	VCU	15
4	St. Joseph's	4
Winner's bracket
3	Rhode Island	8
2	Dayton	2
4	St. Joseph's	5
2	Dayton	11
Loser's bracket

Friday, May 28
1	VCU	10
3	Rhode Island	4
2	Dayton	3
3	Rhode Island	1

Saturday, May 29
1	VCU	7	–
2	Dayton	6	–
