= John B. Schuerholz Park =

Baseball stadium in Towson, Maryland

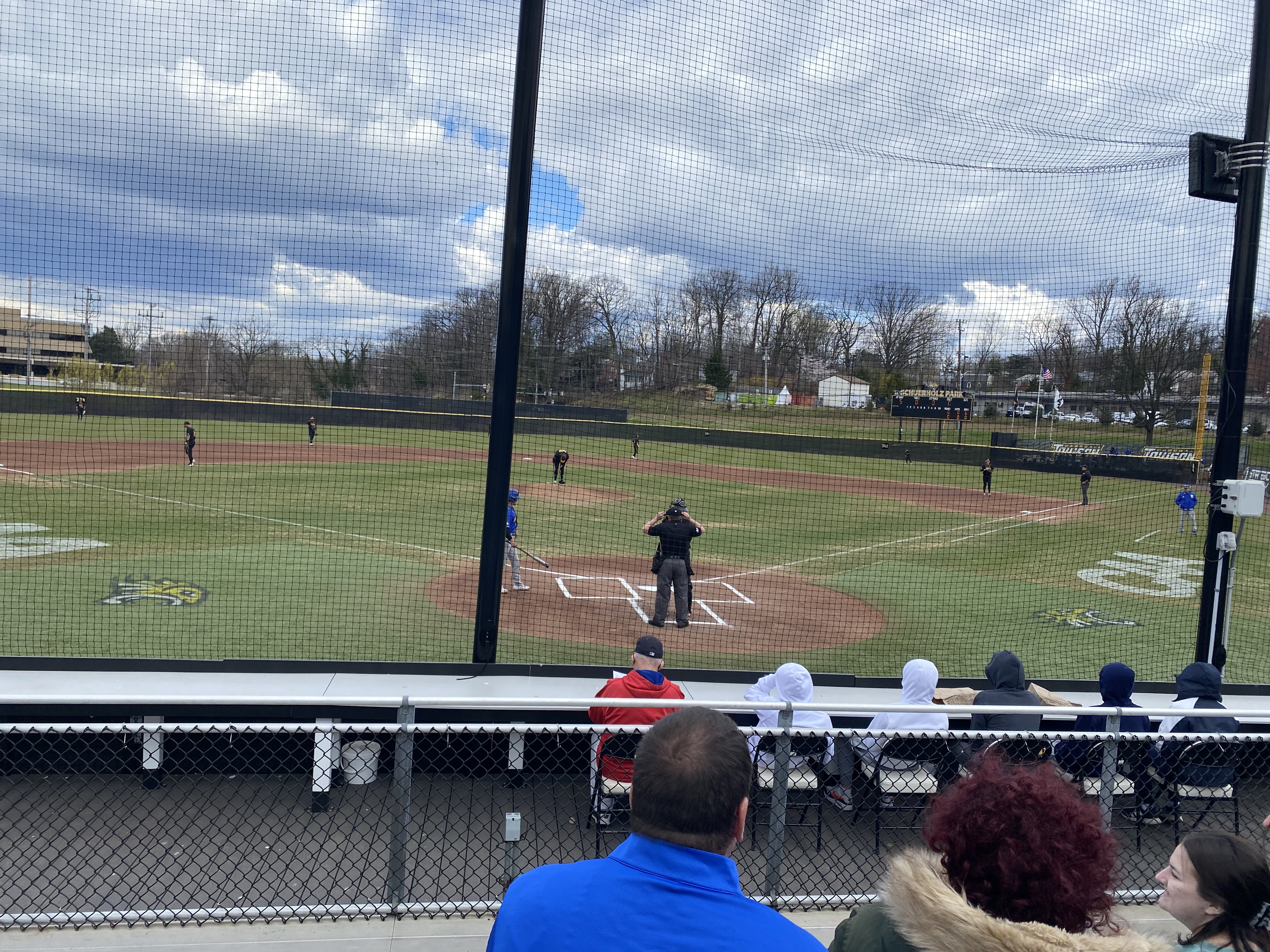

- Location within Maryland Location within the United States
- Interactive map of John B. Schuerholz Park
- Address: 7500 Osler Drive; Towson, MD 21252
- Coordinates: 39.395065°N 76.613739°W
- Owner: Towson University
- Operator: Towson University
- Capacity: 500
- Surface: Grass

Construction
- Opened: April 29, 2001

Tenant
- Towson Tigers baseball (CAA) 2001–present

Website
- towsontigers.com/sports/2014/7/14/schuerholzpark.aspx

The John B. Schuerholz Park is a baseball venue located in Towson, Maryland, United States. It is used by the Towson University Tigers baseball team. It has a capacity of 500 spectators and opened in 2001. The playing surface of the field is natural grass.

On April 29, 2001, the baseball facility at Towson University was named John B. Schuerholz Park. The stadium is named in honor of John Schuerholz, a 1962 Towson alumnus and former member of the baseball program. His contributions to Towson University allowed the renovations to take place. He is the Vice Chairman Emeritus of the Atlanta Braves.

The renovations to the facility included permanent seating, a press box, and a concessions area.

== See also ==
- List of NCAA Division I baseball venues
