= 2013 NCAA Division I baseball season =

Baseball season

- Duration: February 15, 2013–June 25, 2013
- Number of teams: 298
- Preseason No. 1: Arkansas (CB, Coaches, NCBWA); North Carolina (BA)

Tournament
- Duration: May 31–June 25, 2013
- Most conference bids: SEC (9)

College World Series
- Champions: UCLA (1st title)
- Runners-up: Mississippi State (9th CWS Appearance)
- Winning coach: John Savage (1st title)
- MOP: Adam Plutko (UCLA)

Seasons
- ← 2012 2014 →

The 2013 NCAA Division I baseball season, play of college baseball in the United States organized by the National Collegiate Athletic Association (NCAA) at the Division I level, began on February 15, 2013. The season progressed through the regular season, many conference tournaments and championship series, and concluded with the 2013 NCAA Division I baseball tournament and 2013 College World Series. The College World Series, consisting of the eight remaining teams in the NCAA tournament and held annually in Omaha, Nebraska, at TD Ameritrade Park concluded on June 25, 2013 with the final game of the best of three championship series. UCLA defeated Mississippi State two games to none to claim their first championship.

== Realignment ==
- CSU Bakersfield, Dallas Baptist, Seattle, Texas–Arlington, Texas State, and UTSA joined the Western Athletic Conference, making that a ten-team baseball league.
- Fresno State and Nevada moved from the Western Athletic Conference to the Mountain West Conference.
- Missouri and Texas A&M moved from the Big 12 Conference to the Southeastern Conference, making that a fourteen team league. Missouri joined the East Division, while the Aggies will play in the West.
- TCU and West Virginia moved to the Big 12 Conference from the Mountain West Conference and Big East Conference, respectively.

=== Conference formats ===
- The Big South Conference split into two six-team divisions prior to the season.

== Season outlook ==
Collegiate Baseball News
Ranking	Team
1	Arkansas
2	North Carolina
3	Vanderbilt
4	LSU
5	UCLA
6	Oregon
7	South Carolina
8	Kentucky
9	Stanford
10	Oregon State
11	NC State
12	San Diego
13	Mississippi State
14	Oklahoma
15	TCU
16	Arizona State
17	Georgia Tech
18	Arizona
19	Florida State
20	Rice
21	Texas
22	Louisville
23	Cal State Fullerton
24	Florida
25	Ole Miss

Baseball America
Ranking	Team
1	North Carolina
2	Vanderbilt
3	Arkansas
4	Louisville
5	Mississippi State
6	Oregon State
7	South Carolina
8	NC State
9	Stanford
10	LSU
11	Kentucky
12	UCLA
13	Ole Miss
14	TCU
15	Oregon
16	Georgia Tech
17	Florida
18	Rice
19	Oklahoma
20	Florida State
21	New Mexico
22	Cal State Fullerton
23	Southern Miss
24	Arizona
25	San Diego

Coaches'
Ranking	Team
1	Arkansas
2	UCLA
3	LSU
4	North Carolina
5	South Carolina
6	Oregon
7	Stanford
8	Vanderbilt
9	Florida State
10	Arizona
11	NC State
12	TCU
13	Florida
14	Oregon State
15	Kentucky
16	Oklahoma
17	Rice
T - 18	Mississippi State
T - 18	San Diego
20	Arizona State
21	Georgia Tech
22	Cal State Fullerton
23	Baylor
24	Texas A&M
T - 25	Virginia
T - 25	Louisville

NCBWA'
Ranking	Team
1	Arkansas
2	North Carolina
3	LSU
4	Vanderbilt
5	UCLA
6	South Carolina
7	Stanford
8	Oregon
9	NC State
10	Oregon State
11	Florida State
12	Kentucky
13	TCU
14	Arizona
15	Florida
16	Mississippi State
17	Oklahoma
18	Rice
19	Louisville
20	San Diego
21	Georgia Tech
22	Arizona State
23	Cal State Fullerton
24	Texas A&M
25	Ole Miss

== Conference standings ==
This is a partial list of conference standings for the 2013 season.

2013 America East Conference baseball standings
	Conf.						Overall
Team	W		L		T	PCT	W		L		T	PCT
Maine ‍†‍‍	20	–	9	–	0	.690	37	–	22	–	0	.627
Binghamton ‍‍‡‍^{y}	16	–	13	–	0	.552	30	–	24	–	0	.556
Albany ‍‍‍	16	–	14	–	0	.533	23	–	25	–	1	.480
Stony Brook ‍‍‍	15	–	15	–	0	.500	25	–	34	–	0	.424
Hartford ‍‍‍	13	–	17	–	0	.433	17	–	36	–	0	.321
UMBC ‍‍‍	9	–	21	–	0	.300	18	–	30	–	0	.375
† – Conference champion ‡ – Tournament champion y – Invited to the NCAA tournament As of May 19, 2013; Rankings from Collegiate Baseball

2013 Atlantic Coast Conference baseball standings
	Conf.				Overall
Team	W		L	PCT	W		L	PCT
Atlantic
No. 9 Florida State ^{x}‍‍‍^{y}	20	–	10	.667	47	–	17	.734
No. 8 NC State ‍‍‍^{y}	19	–	10	.655	50	–	16	.758
No. 14 Clemson ‍‍‍^{y}	18	–	12	.600	40	–	22	.645
Maryland ‍‍‍	11	–	19	.367	30	–	25	.545
Wake Forest ‍‍‍	9	–	20	.310	28	–	27	.509
Boston College ‍‍‍	4	–	25	.138	12	–	40	.231
Coastal
No. 2 North Carolina ^{x}‍‍‡‍^{y}	21	–	7	.750	59	–	12	.831
No. 7 Virginia ‍‍‍^{y}	22	–	8	.733	50	–	12	.806
Virginia Tech ‍‍‍^{y}	15	–	14	.517	40	–	22	.645
Georgia Tech ‍‍‍^{y}	15	–	15	.500	37	–	27	.578
Miami (FL) ‍‍‍^{y}	14	–	16	.467	37	–	25	.597
Duke ‍‍‍	9	–	21	.300	26	–	29	.473
x – Division champion ‡ – Tournament champion y – Invited to the NCAA tournament As of June 30, 2013; Rankings from Collegiate Baseball

2013 Atlantic 10 Conference baseball standings
	Conf.						Overall
Team	W		L		T	PCT	W		L		T	PCT
Saint Louis ‍†‍‡‍^{y}	17	–	7	–	0	.708	41	–	21	–	0	.661
Charlotte ‍†‍‍	17	–	7	–	0	.708	37	–	23	–	0	.617
Rhode Island ‍†‍‍	17	–	7	–	0	.708	35	–	24	–	0	.593
Xavier ‍‍‍	16	–	8	–	0	.667	32	–	26	–	0	.552
George Washington ‍‍‍	15	–	9	–	0	.625	26	–	32	–	0	.448
La Salle ‍‍‍	15	–	9	–	0	.625	24	–	29	–	0	.453
Richmond ‍‍‍	13	–	11	–	0	.542	31	–	24	–	0	.564
VCU ‍‍‍	12	–	12	–	0	.500	28	–	26	–	0	.519
Saint Joseph's ‍‍‍	12	–	12	–	0	.500	26	–	26	–	0	.500
Butler ‍‍‍	12	–	12	–	0	.500	25	–	26	–	0	.490
St. Bonaventure ‍‍‍	9	–	15	–	0	.375	20	–	28	–	0	.417
Fordham ‍‍‍	8	–	16	–	0	.333	22	–	33	–	0	.400
Temple ‍‍‍	7	–	17	–	0	.292	18	–	28	–	0	.391
Massachusetts ‍‍‍	7	–	17	–	0	.292	14	–	31	–	0	.311
Dayton ‍‍‍	3	–	21	–	0	.125	11	–	39	–	1	.225
† – Conference champion ‡ – Tournament champion y – Invited to the NCAA tournament As of June 3, 2013; Rankings from Collegiate Baseball

2013 Atlantic Sun Conference baseball standings
	Conf.				Overall
Team	W		L	PCT	W		L	PCT
Mercer ‍†‍‍^{y}	20	–	7	.741	43	–	18	.705
Florida Gulf Coast ‍‍‍	19	–	8	.704	37	–	20	.649
North Florida ‍‍‍	18	–	9	.667	40	–	19	.678
East Tennessee State ‍‍‡‍^{y}	17	–	10	.630	36	–	24	.600
Stetson ‍‍‍	15	–	12	.556	26	–	31	.456
Kennesaw State ‍‍‍	13	–	14	.481	30	–	30	.500
Lipscomb ‍‍‍	13	–	14	.481	25	–	34	.424
South Carolina Upstate ‍‍‍	9	–	18	.333	28	–	30	.483
Jacksonville ‍‍‍	8	–	19	.296	17	–	38	.309
Northern Kentucky ‍‍‍	3	–	24	.111	8	–	47	.145
† – Conference champion ‡ – Tournament champion y – Invited to the NCAA tournament As of June 3, 2013; Rankings from Collegiate Baseball

2013 Big 12 Conference baseball standings
	Conf.				Overall
Team	W		L	PCT	W		L	PCT
No. 15 Kansas State ‍†‍‍^{y}	16	–	8	.667	45	–	19	.703
No. 22 Oklahoma State ‍‍‍^{y}	13	–	10	.565	41	–	19	.683
West Virginia ‍‍‍	13	–	11	.542	33	–	26	.559
No. 16 Oklahoma ‍‍‡‍^{y}	13	–	11	.542	43	–	21	.672
Baylor ‍‍‍	12	–	11	.522	27	–	28	.491
Kansas ‍‍‍	12	–	12	.500	34	–	25	.576
TCU ‍‍‍	12	–	12	.500	29	–	28	.509
Texas Tech ‍‍‍	9	–	15	.375	26	–	30	.464
Texas ‍‍‍	7	–	17	.292	27	–	24	.529
† – Conference champion ‡ – Tournament champion y – Invited to the NCAA tournament Rankings from Collegiate Baseball

2013 Big East Conference baseball standings
	Conf.				Overall
Team	W		L	PCT	W		L	PCT
No. 8 Louisville ‍†‍‍^{y}	20	–	4	.833	51	–	14	.785
Pittsburgh ‍‍‍	18	–	6	.750	42	–	17	.712
Seton Hall ‍‍‍	18	–	6	.750	37	–	19	.661
South Florida ‍‍‍	17	–	7	.708	36	–	22	.621
Rutgers ‍‍‍	14	–	10	.583	28	–	30	.483
St. John's ‍‍‍	10	–	14	.417	23	–	35	.397
Notre Dame ‍‍‍	10	–	14	.417	34	–	24	.586
Connecticut ‍‍‡‍^{y}	9	–	15	.375	35	–	28	.556
Cincinnati ‍‍‍	6	–	18	.250	24	–	32	.429
Georgetown ‍‍‍	5	–	19	.208	25	–	28	.472
Villanova ‍‍‍	5	–	19	.208	14	–	39	.264
† – Conference champion ‡ – Tournament champion y – Invited to the NCAA tournament As of June 18, 2013; Rankings from Collegiate Baseball

2013 Big Ten Conference baseball standings
	Conf.				Overall
Team	W		L	PCT	W		L	PCT
No. 6 Indiana ‍†‍‡‍^{y}	17	–	7	.708	49	–	16	.754
Ohio State ‍‍‍	15	–	9	.625	35	–	23	.603
Nebraska ‍‍‍	15	–	9	.625	29	–	30	.492
Minnesota ‍‍‍	13	–	8	.619	32	–	22	.593
Illinois ‍‍‍^{y}	14	–	10	.583	35	–	20	.636
Michigan ‍‍‍	14	–	10	.583	29	–	27	.518
Michigan State ‍‍‍	12	–	9	.571	33	–	17	.660
Iowa ‍‍‍	10	–	14	.417	22	–	27	.449
Northwestern ‍‍‍	9	–	15	.375	22	–	26	.458
Purdue ‍‍‍	6	–	18	.250	17	–	34	.333
Penn State ‍‍‍	4	–	20	.167	14	–	36	.280
† – Conference champion ‡ – Tournament champion y – Invited to the NCAA tournament As of June 19, 2013; Rankings from Collegiate Baseball

2013 Colonial Athletic Association baseball standings
	Conf.				Overall
Team	W		L	PCT	W		L	PCT
UNC Wilmington ‍†‍‍^{y}	18	–	8	.692	38	–	23	.623
William & Mary ‍‍‍^{y}	17	–	10	.630	39	–	24	.619
Delaware ‍‍‍	15	–	12	.556	33	–	22	.600
Old Dominion ‍‍‍	15	–	12	.556	30	–	24	.556
Georgia State ‍‍‍	14	–	13	.519	35	–	21	.625
Towson ‍‍‡‍^{y}	14	–	13	.519	30	–	30	.500
Northeastern ‍‍‍	12	–	15	.444	31	–	26	.544
James Madison ‍‍‍	11	–	15	.423	25	–	30	.455
Hofstra ‍‍‍	11	–	16	.407	26	–	27	.491
George Mason ‍‍‍	7	–	20	.259	18	–	35	.340
† – Conference champion ‡ – Tournament champion y – Invited to the NCAA tournament As of June 30, 2013; Rankings from Collegiate Baseball

2013 Conference USA baseball standings
	Conf.				Overall
Team	W		L	PCT	W		L	PCT
No. 14 Rice ‍†‍‡‍^{y}	15	–	9	.625	44	–	20	.688
Southern Miss ‍‍‍	15	–	9	.625	30	–	27	.526
East Carolina ‍‍‍	14	–	10	.583	31	–	26	.544
Memphis ‍‍‍	14	–	10	.583	35	–	24	.593
UCF ‍‍‍	13	–	11	.542	29	–	30	.492
Houston ‍‍‍	13	–	11	.542	36	–	22	.621
Tulane ‍‍‍	11	–	13	.458	30	–	28	.517
UAB ‍‍‍	7	–	17	.292	23	–	36	.390
Marshall ‍‍‍	6	–	18	.250	20	–	34	.370
† – Conference champion ‡ – Tournament champion y – Invited to the NCAA tournament As of June 8, 2013; Rankings from Collegiate Baseball

2013 Great West Conference baseball standings
	Conf.						Overall
Team	W		L		T	PCT	W		L		T	PCT
Northern Colorado ‍†‍‍	20	–	7	–	0	.741	33	–	24	–	0	.579
Houston Baptist ‍‍‡‍	17	–	10	–	0	.630	34	–	24	–	1	.585
Texas-Pan American ‍‍‍	17	–	10	–	0	.630	28	–	30	–	0	.483
Utah Valley ‍‍‍	15	–	9	–	0	.625	24	–	30	–	0	.444
North Dakota ‍‍‍	13	–	11	–	0	.542	25	–	22	–	1	.531
NJIT ‍‍‍	11	–	16	–	0	.407	20	–	34	–	0	.370
NYIT ‍‍‍	8	–	20	–	0	.286	10	–	47	–	0	.175
Chicago State ‍‍‍	5	–	23	–	0	.179	10	–	45	–	0	.182
† – Conference champion ‡ – Tournament champion As of June 1, 2013; Rankings from Collegiate Baseball

2013 Mountain West Conference baseball standings
	Conf.				Overall
Team	W		L	PCT	W		L	PCT
New Mexico ‍†‍‍^{y}	25	–	5	.833	37	–	22	.627
UNLV ‍‍‍	18	–	12	.600	37	–	20	.649
San Diego State ‍‍‡‍^{y}	15	–	15	.500	31	–	31	.500
Fresno State ‍‍‍	14	–	16	.467	23	–	33	.411
Nevada ‍‍‍	11	–	19	.367	25	–	32	.439
Air Force ‍‍‍	7	–	23	.233	15	–	39	.278
† – Conference champion ‡ – Tournament champion y – Invited to the NCAA tournament As of June 30, 2013; Rankings from Collegiate Baseball

2013 Pac-12 Conference baseball standings
	Conf.						Overall
Team	W		L		T	PCT	W		L		T	PCT
No. 4 Oregon State ‍†‍‍^{y}	24	–	6	–	0	.800	52	–	12	–	0	.813
No. 17 Oregon ‍‍‍^{y}	22	–	8	–	0	.733	48	–	16	–	0	.750
No. 1 UCLA ‍‍‍^{y}	21	–	9	–	0	.700	46	–	17	–	0	.730
No. 19 Arizona State ‍‍‍^{y}	16	–	14	–	0	.533	37	–	22	–	1	.625
Stanford ‍‍‍	16	–	14	–	0	.533	32	–	22	–	0	.593
Arizona ‍‍‍	15	–	15	–	0	.500	34	–	21	–	0	.618
Washington ‍‍‍	15	–	15	–	0	.500	24	–	32	–	0	.429
California ‍‍‍	10	–	20	–	0	.333	23	–	31	–	0	.426
Southern California ‍‍‍	10	–	20	–	0	.333	20	–	36	–	0	.357
Washington State ‍‍‍	9	–	21	–	0	.300	23	–	32	–	0	.418
Utah ‍‍‍	7	–	23	–	0	.233	21	–	31	–	0	.404
† – Conference champion y – Invited to the NCAA tournament As of June 22, 2013; Rankings from Collegiate Baseball

2013 Southeastern Conference baseball standings
	Conf.				Overall
Team	W		L	PCT	W		L	PCT
Eastern
No. 9 Vanderbilt ^{x}‍†‍‍^{y}	26	–	3	.897	54	–	12	.818
No. 13 South Carolina ‍‍‍^{y}	17	–	12	.586	43	–	20	.683
Florida ‍‍‍^{y}	14	–	16	.467	29	–	30	.492
Kentucky ‍‍‍	11	–	19	.367	30	–	25	.545
Missouri ‍‍‍	10	–	20	.333	18	–	32	.360
Tennessee ‍‍‍	8	–	20	.286	22	–	30	.423
Georgia ‍‍‍	7	–	20	.259	21	–	32	.396
Western
No. 7 LSU ^{x}‍‍‡‍^{y}	23	–	7	.767	57	–	11	.838
No. 18 Arkansas ‍‍‍^{y}	18	–	11	.621	39	–	22	.639
No. 2 Mississippi State ‍‍‍^{y}	16	–	14	.533	51	–	20	.718
Ole Miss ‍‍‍^{y}	15	–	15	.500	38	–	24	.613
Alabama ‍‍‍^{y}	14	–	15	.483	35	–	28	.556
Texas A&M ‍‍‍^{y}	13	–	16	.448	34	–	29	.540
Auburn ‍‍‍	13	–	17	.433	33	–	23	.589
x – Division champion † – Conference champion ‡ – Tournament champion y – Invited to the NCAA tournament As of June 26, 2013; Rankings from Collegiate Baseball

2013 Southern Conference baseball standings
	Conf.				Overall
Team	W		L	PCT	W		L	PCT
Western Carolina ‍†‍‍	23	–	7	.767	39	–	20	.661
College of Charleston ‍‍‍	18	–	11	.621	31	–	26	.544
Elon ‍‍‡‍^{y}	18	–	11	.621	34	–	30	.531
The Citadel ‍‍‍	18	–	12	.600	35	–	25	.583
Appalachian State ‍‍‍	13	–	14	.481	30	–	24	.556
Furman ‍‍‍	14	–	16	.467	32	–	25	.561
Georgia Southern ‍‍‍	13	–	17	.433	27	–	32	.458
Samford ‍‍‍	12	–	17	.414	27	–	30	.474
Davidson ‍‍‍	12	–	18	.400	18	–	31	.367
UNC Greensboro ‍‍‍	11	–	19	.367	24	–	31	.436
Wofford ‍‍‍	10	–	20	.333	20	–	36	.357
† – Conference champion ‡ – Tournament champion y – Invited to the NCAA tournament As of June 30, 2013; Rankings from Collegiate Baseball

2013 Western Athletic Conference baseball standings
	Conf.				Overall
Team	W		L	PCT	W		L	PCT
Cal State Bakersfield ‍†‍‍	18	–	9	.667	37	–	22	.627
Texas–Arlington ‍†‍‍	18	–	9	.667	31	–	27	.534
Texas State ‍‍‍	16	–	11	.593	29	–	29	.500
UTSA ‍‍‡‍^{y}	15	–	11	.577	35	–	25	.583
Sacramento State ‍‍‍	14	–	13	.519	34	–	25	.576
New Mexico State ‍‍‍	13	–	14	.481	29	–	28	.509
Dallas Baptist ‍‍‍	13	–	14	.481	30	–	30	.500
San Jose State ‍‍‍	11	–	16	.407	17	–	41	.293
Seattle ‍‍‍	10	–	16	.385	21	–	33	.389
Louisiana Tech ‍‍‍	6	–	21	.222	19	–	37	.339
† – Conference champion ‡ – Tournament champion y – Invited to the NCAA tournament As of June 1, 2013; Rankings from Collegiate Baseball

=== Conference winners and tournaments ===
Thirty one athletic conferences each end their regular seasons with a single-elimination tournament or a double-elimination tournament. The teams in each conference that win their regular season title are given the number one seed in each tournament. The winners of these tournaments receive automatic invitations to the 2013 NCAA Division I baseball tournament. The West Coast Conference will launch a four team tournament for the first time in 2013. The winner of the Great West Conference, which remains in a provisional status, does not receive an automatic bid.

Conference	Regular season winner	Conference Player of the Year	Conference Coach of the Year	Conference tournament	Tournament venue (city)	Tournament winner
America East Conference	Maine	Michael Fransoso, Maine	Steve Trimper, Maine	2013 America East Conference baseball tournament	LeLacheur Park • Lowell, MA	Binghamton
Atlantic 10 Conference	Saint Louis; Charlotte; Rhode Island	Jason Seager, Charlotte; Mike Vigliariolo, Saint Louis	Gregg Ritchie, George Washington	2013 Atlantic 10 Conference baseball tournament	Robert and Mariam Hayes Stadium • Charlotte, NC	Saint Louis
Atlantic Coast Conference	Atlantic - Florida State; Coastal - North Carolina	Colin Moran, North Carolina	Brian O'Connor, Virginia	2013 Atlantic Coast Conference baseball tournament	Durham Bulls Athletic Park • Durham, NC	North Carolina
Atlantic Sun Conference	Mercer	Chesny Young, Mercer	Craig Gibson, Mercer	2013 Atlantic Sun Conference baseball tournament	Melching Field at Conrad Park • DeLand, FL	East Tennessee State
Big 12 Conference	Kansas State	Ross Kivett, Kansas State	Brad Hill, Kansas State	2013 Big 12 Conference baseball tournament	Chickasaw Bricktown Ballpark • Oklahoma City, OK	Oklahoma
Big East Conference	Louisville	Eric Jagielo, Notre Dame	Joe Jordano, Pittsburgh	2013 Big East Conference baseball tournament	Bright House Field • Clearwater, FL	Connecticut
Big South Conference	North - Campbell; South - Coastal Carolina	Rob Dickinson, VMI	Greg Goff, Campbell	2013 Big South Conference baseball tournament	Liberty Baseball Stadium • Lynchburg, VA	Liberty
Big Ten Conference	Indiana	Justin Parr, Illinois	Tracy Smith, Indiana	2013 Big Ten Conference baseball tournament	Target Field • Minneapolis, MN	Indiana
Big West Conference	Cal State Fullerton	Carlos Lopez, Cal State Fullerton; Taylor Sparks, UC Irvine	Rick Vanderhook, Cal State Fullerton	No tournament, regular season champion earns auto bid		
Colonial Athletic Association	UNC Wilmington	Jimmy Yezzo, Delaware	Jamie Pinzino, William & Mary; Mark Scalf, UNC Wilmington	2013 Colonial Athletic Association baseball tournament	Eagle Field at Veterans Memorial Park • Harrisonburg, VA	Towson
Conference USA	Rice; Southern Miss	Chris Taladay, UCF	Daron Schoenrock, Memphis	2013 Conference USA baseball tournament	Reckling Park • Houston, TX	Rice
Great West Conference	Northern Colorado	Jensen Park, Northern Colorado	Carl Iwasaki, Northern Colorado	2013 Great West Conference baseball tournament	Bears & Eagles Riverfront Stadium • Newark, NJ	Houston Baptist
Horizon League	Wisconsin–Milwaukee	Michael Porcaro, Wisconsin–Milwaukee	Scott Doffek, Wisconsin–Milwaukee	2013 Horizon League baseball tournament	Eastwood Field • Niles, OH	Valparaiso
Ivy League	Gehrig - Columbia; Rolfe - Dartmouth	Mike Ford, Princeton	—N/a	2013 Ivy League Baseball Championship Series	Hal Robertson Field at Phillip Satow Stadium • New York, NY	Columbia
Metro Atlantic Athletic Conference	Rider	Mike Fish, Siena	Barry Davis, Rider	2013 Metro Atlantic Athletic Conference baseball tournament	Arm & Hammer Park • Trenton, NJ	Canisius
Mid-American Conference	East - Kent State; West - Northern Illinois	Jason Kanzler, Buffalo	Ron Torgalski, Buffalo	2013 Mid-American Conference baseball tournament	All Pro Freight Stadium • Avon, OH	Bowling Green
Mid-Eastern Athletic Conference	Northern - Delaware State; Southern - Savannah State	Kelvin Freeman, North Carolina A&T	Carlton Hardy, Savannah State	2013 Mid–Eastern Athletic Conference baseball tournament	Marty L. Miller Field • Norfolk, VA	Savannah State
Missouri Valley Conference	Illinois State	Mike Tauchman, Bradley	Mark Kingston, Illinois State	2013 Missouri Valley Conference baseball tournament	Duffy Bass Field • Normal, IL	Wichita State
Mountain West Conference	New Mexico	Mitchell Garver, New Mexico; D.J. Peterson, New Mexico	Ray Birmingham, New Mexico	2013 Mountain West Conference baseball tournament	Pete Beiden Field • Fresno, CA	San Diego State
Northeast Conference	Bryant	Kevin Brown, Bryant	Steve Owens	2013 Northeast Conference baseball tournament	FirstEnergy Park • Lakewood, NJ	Bryant
Ohio Valley Conference	Tennessee Tech	Craig Massoni, Austin Peay	Matt Bragga, Tennessee Tech	2013 Ohio Valley Conference baseball tournament	The Ballpark at Jackson • Jackson, TN	Austin Peay
Pac-12 Conference	Oregon State	Michael Conforto, Oregon State	Pat Casey, Oregon State	No tournament, regular season champion earns auto bid		
Patriot League	Holy Cross	Jordan Enos, Holy Cross	Greg DiCenzo, Holy Cross	2013 Patriot League baseball tournament	Campus Sites	Army
Southeastern Conference	East – Vanderbilt; West – LSU	Tony Kemp, Vanderbilt	Tim Corbin, Vanderbilt	2013 Southeastern Conference baseball tournament	Regions Park • Hoover, AL	LSU
Southern Conference	Western Carolina	Ryan Kinsella, Elon	Bobby Moranda, Western Carolina	2013 Southern Conference baseball tournament	Fluor Field at the West End • Greenville, SC	Elon
Southland Conference	Sam Houston State	Hunter Dozier, Stephen F. Austin	David Pierce	2013 Southland Conference baseball tournament	Constellation Field • Sugar Land, TX	Central Arkansas
Southwestern Athletic Conference	East - Jackson State; West - Southern	Isias Alcantar, Arkansas–Pine Bluff Golden Lions	Carlos James, Arkansas–Pine Bluff Golden Lions	2013 Southwestern Athletic Conference baseball tournament	LaGrave Field • Fort Worth, TX	Jackson State
The Summit League	Omaha	Ryan Keele, Omaha	Bob Herold, Omaha	2013 The Summit League baseball tournament	Oakland University Baseball Field • Rochester, MI	South Dakota State
Sun Belt Conference	South Alabama; Troy	Jordan Patterson, South Alabama	Mark Calvi, South Alabama	2013 Sun Belt Conference baseball tournament	M. L. Tigue Moore Field • Lafayette, LA	Florida Atlantic
West Coast Conference	Gonzaga	Kris Bryant, San Diego	Mark Machtolf, Gonzaga	2013 West Coast Conference baseball tournament	Banner Island Ballpark • Stockton, CA	San Diego
Western Athletic Conference	Cal State Bakersfield; Texas–Arlington	Tyler Shryock, Cal State Bakersfield	Bill Kernen, Cal State Bakersfield	2013 Western Athletic Conference baseball tournament	QuikTrip Park • Grand Prairie, TX	UTSA

== College World Series ==
The 2013 season marked the sixty seventh NCAA baseball tournament, which culminated with the eight team College World Series. The College World Series was held in Omaha, Nebraska. The eight teams played a double-elimination format, with UCLA claiming their first championship with a two games to one series win over Mississippi State in the final.

=== Bracket ===
First round
1	North Carolina	1
NC State	8
UCLA	2
4	LSU	1
1	North Carolina	4
4	LSU	2
3	Oregon State	4
Mississippi State	5
Indiana	2
Louisville	0
3	Oregon State	11
Louisville	4

Second round
NC State	1
UCLA	2
1	North Carolina	7
NC State	0
Mississippi State	5
Indiana	4
3	Oregon State	1
Indiana	0

Semi-finals
UCLA	4	-
1	North Carolina	1	-
Mississippi State	4	-
3	Oregon State	1	-

Finals
UCLA	3	8	-
Mississippi State	1	0	-

== Award winners ==
=== Major player of the year awards ===
- Dick Howser Trophy: Kris Bryant, San Diego
- Baseball America: Kris Bryant, San Diego
- Collegiate Baseball/Louisville Slugger:Kris Bryant, San Diego
- American Baseball Coaches Association: Kris Bryant, San Diego
- Golden Spikes Award: Kris Bryant, San Diego

=== Major freshman of the year awards ===
- Baseball America Freshman Of The Year:
- Collegiate Baseball Freshman Player of the Year:
- Collegiate Baseball Freshman Pitcher of the Year:

=== Major coach of the year awards ===
- American Baseball Coaches Association:
- Baseball America:
- Collegiate Baseball Coach of the Year:
- National Collegiate Baseball Writers Association (NCBWA) National Coach of the Year:
- Chuck Tanner Collegiate Baseball Manager of the Year Award:
- ABCA/Baseball America Assistant Coach of the Year:

=== Other major awards ===
- Senior CLASS Award (baseball) (outstanding Senior of the Year in baseball): Carlos Lopez, Cal State Fullerton
- Johnny Bench Award (Catcher of the Year): Stuart Turner, Ole Miss
- Brooks Wallace Award (Shortstop of the Year): Alex Bregman, LSU
- American Baseball Coaches Association Gold Glove:

== See also ==
- 2013 NCAA Division I baseball rankings
- 2013 NCAA Division I baseball tournament
