= 2013 Richmond Spiders baseball team =

American college baseball season

2013 Richmond Spiders baseball
- Conference: Atlantic 10 Conference
- Record: 31–24 (14–13 A-10)
- Head coach: Mark McQueen (6th season)
- Assistant coaches: Tag Montague; Charlie Goens; Tanner Biagini
- Home stadium: Malcolm U. Pitt Field

2013 Atlantic 10 Conference baseball standings
	Conf.						Overall
Team	W		L		T	PCT	W		L		T	PCT
Saint Louis ‍†‍‡‍^{y}	17	–	7	–	0	.708	41	–	21	–	0	.661
Charlotte ‍†‍‍	17	–	7	–	0	.708	37	–	23	–	0	.617
Rhode Island ‍†‍‍	17	–	7	–	0	.708	35	–	24	–	0	.593
Xavier ‍‍‍	16	–	8	–	0	.667	32	–	26	–	0	.552
George Washington ‍‍‍	15	–	9	–	0	.625	26	–	32	–	0	.448
La Salle ‍‍‍	15	–	9	–	0	.625	24	–	29	–	0	.453
Richmond ‍‍‍	13	–	11	–	0	.542	31	–	24	–	0	.564
VCU ‍‍‍	12	–	12	–	0	.500	28	–	26	–	0	.519
Saint Joseph's ‍‍‍	12	–	12	–	0	.500	26	–	26	–	0	.500
Butler ‍‍‍	12	–	12	–	0	.500	25	–	26	–	0	.490
St. Bonaventure ‍‍‍	9	–	15	–	0	.375	20	–	28	–	0	.417
Fordham ‍‍‍	8	–	16	–	0	.333	22	–	33	–	0	.400
Temple ‍‍‍	7	–	17	–	0	.292	18	–	28	–	0	.391
Massachusetts ‍‍‍	7	–	17	–	0	.292	14	–	31	–	0	.311
Dayton ‍‍‍	3	–	21	–	0	.125	11	–	39	–	1	.225
† – Conference champion ‡ – Tournament champion y – Invited to the NCAA tournament As of June 3, 2013; Rankings from Collegiate Baseball

The 2013 Richmond Spiders baseball team represented University of Richmond in the 2013 NCAA Division I baseball season. They were coming off a 2012 season, in which they made it to the Atlantic 10 Championship game. Head coach Mark McQueen was in his 5th year coaching the Spiders.

== Personnel ==
=== 2013 Roster ===
2013 Richmond Spiders Roster
Pitchers: 10 Minaya, Jolmi - Senior; 30 Brockett, Andrew - Junior; 31 Bayer, Peter - Freshman; 14 Blum, Andrew - Junior; 15 Cook, Ryan - Sophomore; 21 de Marte, Jonathan - Redshirt Freshman; 18 Harron, Ray - Sophomore; 37 Lively, James - Sophomore; 28 Martinson, Dan - Freshman; 27 Bates, Chris - Redshirt Sophomore; 46 Donnelly, Ryan - Freshman; 19 Grossfeld, Zach- Sophomore; 26 Sterling, Zak - Freshman; 24 Stoops, Dylan - Redshirt Sophomore	Infielders: 16 Mayers, Jacob - Senior; 4 Bell, Chris - Senior; 23 Forrer, Adam - Junior; 12 Poulos, Nick - Junior; 13 Vecchione, Joey - Sophomore; 17 Beckwith, Tyler - Freshman; 3 Small, Mike - Junior; Utility: 11 Kraeger, Doug - Freshman; 6 Gadd, JB - Freshman; 33 Williams, Bret - Redshirt Senior	Catchers: 20 Levine, Michael - Freshman; 8 Moheit, Cory - Junior; 9 Newman, Aaron - Freshman; Outfielders: 25 Flanagan, Eric - Sophomore; 5 Fraser, Jansen - Freshman; 2 Stanley, Tanner - Freshman; 7 Zink, Matt - Redshirt Senior

== Schedule ==
2013 Richmond Spiders baseball game log
Regular season
February

Date	Opponent	Rank	Site/stadium	Score	Win	Loss	Save	Attendance	Overall record	A-10 record
February 15	Bucknell	–	Pitt Field	10–4	J. de Marte (1-0)	Weigel (0-1)	None	352	1–0	–
February 16	Bucknell	–	Pitt Field	6-3	Z. Sterling (1-0)	Hough (0-1)	R. Cook (1)	103	2-0	–
February 17	Bucknell	–	Pitt Field	6-1	A. Blum (1-0)	Goldstien (0-1)	None	101	3-0	–
February 20	VMI	–	Pitt Field	5-4	R. Donnelly (1-0)	Lighton (0-1)	D. Stoops (1)	176	4-0	–
February 22	at Jacksonville	–	John Sessions Stadium	8–3	J. de Marte (2-0)	Anderson, C (0-1)	R. Cook (2)	162	5-0	–
February 23	at Jacksonville	–	John Sessions Stadium	4–5	Mcrae (1-0)	Z. Sterling (1-1)	Woods(1)	155	5–1	–
February 24	at Jacksonville	–	John Sessions Stadium	8–9	Maxon (1-0)	D. Stoops (0-1)	None	176	5–2	–
February 27	Coppin State	–	Pitt Field	13-0	C. Bates (1-0)	Hawk (0-1)	None	131	6–2	–

March

Date	Opponent	Rank	Site/stadium	Score	Win	Loss	Save	Attendance	Overall record	A-10 record
March 1	Wagner	–	Pitt Field	8–6	J. de Marte (3-0)	C. Smith (0-1)	D. Stoops(2)	108	7–2	–
March 2	Wagner	–	Pitt Field	4–2	Z. Sterling (2-1)	Casey (0-2)	J. Lively(1)	104	8–2	–
March 3	Wagner	–	Pitt Field	10-5	A. Blum (2-0)	Schmardel (0-1)	D. Stoops (3)	247	9–2	–
March 5	Old Dominion	–	Pitt Field	7-6	P. Bayer (1-0)	Alexander (0-2)	R. Cook (3)	132	10–2	–
March 6	Longwood	–	Pitt Field	Cancelled due to weather						
March 9	Quinnipiac	–	Pitt Field	2-1	J. Lively (1-0)	D. Lamacchia (1-1)	None	355	11-2	–
March 10	Quinnipiac	–	Pitt Field	5-4	D. Stoops (1-1)	M. Siciliano (0-1)	None	212	12-2	–
March 10	Quinnipiac	–	Pitt Field	2-5	N. Fabrizio (2-0)	R. Cook (0-1)	Binkiewicz (2)	313	12-3	–
March 12	George Mason	–	Pitt Field	11-2	P. Bayer(2-0)	N. Kendrick (1-1)	None	211	13-3	–
March 13	at George Mason	–	Spuhler Field	7-5	R. Harron (1-0)	C. Payne (0-1)	D. Martinson(1)	127	14-3	–
March 15	Rutgers	–	Pitt Field	4-5	C. Lasky (1-0)	R. Cook (0-2)	Corsi(1)	332	14-4	–
March 16	Rutgers	–	Pitt Field	8-9	R. Corsi (1-3)	D. Stoops (1-2)	None	303	14-5	–
March 18	Rutgers	–	Pitt Field	Cancelled due to weather						
March 20	at VMI	–	Gray–Minor Stadium	5-9	T. Lighton (2-2)	P. Bayer (2-1)	None	133	14-6	–
March 22	Charlotte*	–	Pitt Field	5-8	H. May (6-0)	A. Brockett (0-1)	None	210	14-7	0–1
March 23	Charlotte*	–	Pitt Field	4-3	A. Blum (3-0)	R. Mas (1-1)	J. Lively(2)	366	15-7	1-1
March 24	Charlotte*	–	Pitt Field	4-6	R. Mas (2-1)	L. Harron (1-1)	M. Wells(1)	121	15–8	1–2
March 26	at Coppin State	–	Joe Cannon Stadium	Cancelled due to weather						
March 28	at La Salle*	–	Hank DeVincent Field	6–2	Z. Sterling (3-1)	L. Donohue (1-2)	J. Lively(3)	105	16–8	2–2
March 29	at La Salle*	–	Hank DeVincent Field	3–5	Christensen (3-1)	A. Brockett (0-2)	None	109	16-9	2-3
March 30	at La Salle*	–	Hank DeVincent Field	22–1	P. Bayer (3-1)	L. O'Neill (2-3)	None	127	17-9	3-3

April

Date	Opponent	Rank	Site/stadium	Score	Win	Loss	Save	Attendance	Overall record	A-10 record
April 2	Willam & Mary	-	Pitt Field	5–4	J. Mayers (1-0)	M. Aker (1-1)	None	222	18-9	3-3
April 5	at George Washington*	-	Barcroft Park	10-2	Z. Sterling (4-1)	L. Staub (3-2)	None	150	19-9	4-3
April 6	at George Washington*	-	Barcroft Park	3-1	A. Blum (4-0)	C. Milon (2-2)	J. Mayers(2)	238	20-9	5-3
April 7	at George Washington*	-	Barcroft Park	8-7	A. Brockett (1-2)	C. Lejeune (0-1)	R. Harron(1)	207	21-9	6-3
April 9	at Old Dominion	-	Bud Metheny Baseball Complex	4-7	V. Diaz (1-0)	C. Bates (1-1)	B. Smith(6)	384	21-10	6-3
April 12	Northeastern	-	Pitt Field	11-10	J. Lively (2-0)	N. Cubarney (3-3)	None	165	22-10	6-3
April 13	Northeastern	-	Pitt Field	5-12	B. McLean (1-0)	R. Cook (0-3)	None	503	22-11	6-3
April 14	Northeastern	-	Pitt Field	5-4	A. Brockett (2-2)	D. Maki (1-2)	None	211	23-11	6-3
April 17	at William & Mary	-	Plumeri Park	6-7	Sheenan (4-2)	Lively (2-1)	Wainman(5)	235	23-12	6-3
April 19	St. Joseph's*	-	Pitt Field	7-9	Muha (2-0)	Martinson (0-1)	None	121	23-13	6-4
April 20	St. Joseph's*	-	Pitt Field	3-7	Carter (3-2)	Bates (1-2)	Yacabonis(5)	322	23-14	6-5
April 21	St. Joseph's*	-	Pitt Field	2-1	J. Mayers (2-0)	D. Thorpe (3-6)	None	305	24-14	7-5
April 23	at Virginia	-	Davenport Field	2-6	Rosenberger (1-0)	C. Bates (1-3)	None	2,799	24-15	7-5
April 26	at St. Louis*	-	Pitt Field	8-7	P. Bayer (4-1)	A. Alemann (6-3)	None	240	25-15	8-5
April 27	St. Louis*	-	Pitt Field	3-1	A. Blum (5-0)	N. Bates (6-3)	A. Brockett(3)	310	26-15	9-5
April 28	St. Louis*	-	Pitt Field	0-2	C. Smith (6-2)	J. Mayers (2-1)	None	311	26-16	9-6

May

Date	Opponent	Rank	Site/stadium	Score	Win	Loss	Save	Attendance	Overall record	A-10 record
May 3	Temple*	-	Pitt Field	6-1	de Marte (4-0)	P. Peterson (2-6)	Grossfeld(1)	377	27-16	10-6
May 4	Temple*	-	Pitt Field	1-2	E. Peterson (6-2)	A. Blum (5-1)	Kuehn(5)	265	27-17	10-7
May 5	Temple*	-	Pitt Field	4-3	A Brockett (3-2)	McCarthy (2-2)	None	244	28-17	11-7
May 7	at Longwood	-	Farmville, VA	2-3	S. Burkett (1-0)	Harron (1-2)	None	207	28-18	11-7
May 10	at Fordham*	-	Houlihan Park	9-8	Bates (2-3)	Charest (2-9)	None	561	29-18	12-7
May 11	at Fordham*	-	Houlihan Park	1-2	R. Anastasi (4-4)	P. Bayers (4-3)	None	211	29-19	12-8
May 12	at Fordham*	-	Houlihan Park	6-2	J. Mayers (4-1)	J. Murphy (0-5)	None	250	30-19	13-8
May 16	at VCU*	-	The Diamond	3-6	H. Dwyer (7-6)	de Marte (4-1)	M. Lees(10)	709	30-20	13-9
May 17	at VCU*	-	The Diamond	4-5	L. Kanuik (4-2)	Grossfeld (0-1)	M. Lees(11)	250	30-21	13-10
May 18	at VCU*	-	The Diamond	0-5	S. Greene (5-1)	Mayers (4-2)	None	364	30-22	13-11

A-10 Tournament

Date	Opponent	Rank	Site/stadium	Score	Win	Loss	Save	Attendance	Tournament record
May 22	Charlotte	-	Hayes Stadium	5-6	w. Hatley (2-2)	Grossfield (0-2)	R. Mas(4)	-	0-1
May 22	La Salle	-	Hayes Stadium	7-2	J. De Marte (5-1)	R. Donohue (3-5)	None	-	1-1
May 23	St. Louis	-	Hayes Stadium	6-10	Levin (3-0)	Blum (5-2)	None	-	1-2

Rankings from USA TODAY/ESPN Top 25 coaches' baseball poll. Parenthesis indicate tournament seedings.
*Atlantic 10 Conference games

== See also ==
- Richmond Spiders
- 2013 NCAA Division I baseball season
