= 2013 VCU Rams baseball team =

Virginia Commonwealth University sports season

2013 VCU Rams baseball
- Conference: Atlantic 10 Conference
- Record: 16–16 (3–5 A-10)
- Head coach: Shawn Stiffler (1st season)
- Assistant coaches: Jeff Palumbo (2nd season); TBA
- Hitting coach: C.J. Rhodes (3rd season)
- Home stadium: The Diamond

2013 Atlantic 10 Conference baseball standings
	Conf.						Overall
Team	W		L		T	PCT	W		L		T	PCT
Saint Louis ‍†‍‡‍^{y}	17	–	7	–	0	.708	41	–	21	–	0	.661
Charlotte ‍†‍‍	17	–	7	–	0	.708	37	–	23	–	0	.617
Rhode Island ‍†‍‍	17	–	7	–	0	.708	35	–	24	–	0	.593
Xavier ‍‍‍	16	–	8	–	0	.667	32	–	26	–	0	.552
George Washington ‍‍‍	15	–	9	–	0	.625	26	–	32	–	0	.448
La Salle ‍‍‍	15	–	9	–	0	.625	24	–	29	–	0	.453
Richmond ‍‍‍	13	–	11	–	0	.542	31	–	24	–	0	.564
VCU ‍‍‍	12	–	12	–	0	.500	28	–	26	–	0	.519
Saint Joseph's ‍‍‍	12	–	12	–	0	.500	26	–	26	–	0	.500
Butler ‍‍‍	12	–	12	–	0	.500	25	–	26	–	0	.490
St. Bonaventure ‍‍‍	9	–	15	–	0	.375	20	–	28	–	0	.417
Fordham ‍‍‍	8	–	16	–	0	.333	22	–	33	–	0	.400
Temple ‍‍‍	7	–	17	–	0	.292	18	–	28	–	0	.391
Massachusetts ‍‍‍	7	–	17	–	0	.292	14	–	31	–	0	.311
Dayton ‍‍‍	3	–	21	–	0	.125	11	–	39	–	1	.225
† – Conference champion ‡ – Tournament champion y – Invited to the NCAA tournament As of June 3, 2013; Rankings from Collegiate Baseball

The 2013 VCU Rams baseball team will be the 43rd season of the university fielding a varsity baseball program, and will represent Virginia Commonwealth University in the 2013 NCAA Division I baseball season. The Rams will be playing their inaugural season in the Atlantic 10 Conference.

It will be the first season of Shawn Stiffler as manager for the program. It was previously led by Paul Keyes for the past 18 season. Keyes died of cancer in the summer of 2012.

== Personnel ==
=== 2013 roster ===
2013 VCU Rams Roster
Pitchers: 13 Matt Lees - Sophomore; 14 Logan Kanuik - Junior; 16 Michael Carpenter - Freshman; 17 Ryan Farrar - Senior; 20 Seth Greene - Redshirt Junior; 23 Ryan Morrison - Junior; 30 Hunter Absher - Freshman; 31 Tyler Buckley- Junior; 33 Dan Black - Freshman; 35 Heath Dwyer- Sophomore; 38 Jordan Storey - Redshirt Junior	Infielders: 4 Joey Cujas - Junior; 6 Jordan Weymouth - Senior; 10 Tom Crimi - Junior; 12 Robert Malan - Redshirt Junior; 25 Vimael Machin - Sophomore; 26 Trevor Marino - Junior; 27 Brent Mikionis - Redshirt Sophomore; Utility: 18 Bryce Lee - Junior	Catchers: 7 Chris Ayers - Junior; 11 Walker Haymaker - Freshman; 21 Nick Octavi - Junior; Outfielders: 1 James Bunn - Freshman; 2 Bill Cullen - Junior; 3 Landon Prentiss - Junior; 9 Cody Acker - Freshman; 19 Michael Thomas - Freshman; 24 Taylor Buran - Redshirt Senior; 34 Cody Yount - Redshirt Senior

== Schedule ==
2013 VCU Rams baseball game log
Regular season
February

#	Date	Opponent	Site/stadium	Score	Win	Loss	Save	Attendance	Overall record	A10 record
1	02/15/13	vs. Boston College (Elon Invitational)	Latham Park	4–1	M. Lees (1–0)	J. Burke (0–1)	none	200	1–0	—
—	02/16/13	vs. Marist (Elon Invitational)	Latham Park	Postponed					1–0	—
2	02/17/13	@ Elon (Elon Invitational)	Latham Park	6–2	R. Ferrar (1–0)	D. Whitehead (0–1)	J. Weymouth (1)	256	2–0	—
3	02/22/13	Saint Joseph's	The Diamond	1–0	H. Dwyer (2–0)	K. Mullen (1–1)	M. Lees (2)	222	3–0	1–0
4	02/23/13	Saint Joseph's	The Diamond	3–2	L. Kanuik (1–0)	K. Burum (1-1)	M. Lees (3)	210	4-0	0-0
5	02/24/13	Saint Joseph's	The Diamond	2–0	R. Farrar (2–0)	D. Thorpe (0–1)	S. Greene (1)	310	5-0	0-0
—	02/26/13	@ East Carolina	Clark–LeClair Stadium	Postponed					5–0	—

March

#	Date	Opponent	Site/stadium	Score	Win	Loss	Save	Attendance	Overall record	A10 record
6	03/01/13	vs. UNC Asheville (Charleston Crab House Shootout)	Riley Park	12-1	H. Dwyer (3–0)	D. Roland (0–3)	none	125	6-0	0-0
7	03/02/13	@ The Citadel (Charleston Crab House Shootout)	Riley Jr. Park	11-6	T. Buckley (1–0)	J. Reeves (1-1)	none	240	7-0	0-0
8	03/03/13	vs. Pittsburgh (Charleston Crab House Shootout)	Riley Jr. Park	6-4	R. Farrar (3–0)	A. Belfiglio (0–1)	M. Lees (5)	150	8-0	0-0
9	03/05/13	George Mason	The Diamond	4-2	T. Marino (1–0)	T. Love (0–1)	M. Lees(6)	176	9-0	0-0
10	03/08/13	at UNC Wilmington	Brooks Field	3-9	M. Batts (2–0)	H. Dwyer (3–1)	None	713	9-1	0-0
11	03/09/13	at UNC Wilmington	Brooks Field	2-7	J. Ramsey (1–2)	T. Buckley (1-1)	None	976	9-2	0-0
12	03/10/13	at UNC Wilmington	Brooks Field	2-3	MacDonald (2–0)	R. Farrar (3–1)	Livengood (1)	1,037	9-3	0-0
13	03/11/13	Wagner	The Diamond	11-8	S. Greene (1–0)	C. Smith (0–2)	None	210	10-3	0-0
14	03/15/13	Monmouth	The Diamond	1-3	McGee (2–0)	H. Dwyer (3–2)	None	255	10-4	0-0
15	03/16/13	Monmouth	The Diamond	8-3	T. Buckley (2–1)	Smith (0–3)	S. Greene(2)	250	11-4	0-0
16	03/17/13	Monmouth	The Diamond	1-7	Yunginger (2–0)	R. Farrar (3–2)	Hunt(1)	199	11-5	0-0
17	03/19/13	Rutgers	The Diamond	4-3	M. Lees (1–0)	Brey (1-1)	None	237	12-5	0-0
18	03/20/13	Rutgers	The Diamond	6-9	Corsi (2–3)	L. Kanuik (1-1)	None	227	12-6	0-0
19	03/22/13	Butler*	The Diamond	4-6	Stout (4–2)	H. Dwyer (3-3)	BYERLY(2)	214	12-7	0–1
20	03/23/13	Butler*	The Diamond	3-4	Kramp (5–0)	R. Farrar (3-3)	Byerly(3)	222	12-8	0–2
21	03/23/13	Butler*	The Diamond	4-7	Laing (1-1)	S. Greene (1-1)	Byerly(4)	299	12-9	0–3
22	03/26/13	at #1 North Carolina	Boshamer Stadium	2-3	C. McCue (5–0)	M. Lees (1-1)	None	365	12-10	0–3
23	03/29/13	at Charlotte*	Hayes Stadium	5-2	H. Dwyer (4–3)	T. Barnette (1–2)	None	1,089	13-10	1–3
24	03/30/13	at Charlotte*	Hayes Stadium	8-9	J. Hudson (2–0)	M. Lees (1–2)	None	1,141	13-11	1–4
25	03/30/13	at Charlotte*	Hayes Stadium	4-3	L. Kanuik (2–1)	S. Geohegan (1-1)	None	1,148	14-11	2–4

April

#	Date	Opponent	Site/stadium	Score	Win	Loss	Save	Attendance	Overall record	A10 record
26	04/02/13	at Virginia Tech	English Field	5-11	J. Joyce (4–1)	D. Black (0–1)	None	1,042	14-12	2–4
27	04/05/13	at VMI	Gray–Minor Stadium	2-6	C. Bach (2-2)	H. Dwyer (4-4)	None	187	14-13	2–4
28	04/06/13	at VMI	Gray–Minor Stadium	4-5	J. Garrett (2-2)	M. Lees (1–3)	None	234	14-14	2–4
29	04/07/13	at VMI	Gray–Minor Stadium	8-4	L. Kanuik (3–1)	J. Brown (3–1)	None	222	15-14	2–4
30	04/09/13	at Maryland	Shipley Field	5-6	B. Casas (2–0)	A. Absher (0–1)	None	357	15-15	2–4
31	04/12/13	Temple*	The Diamond	2-1	M. Lees (2–3)	P. Peterson (1–4)	None	335	16-15	3–4
32	04/13/13	Temple*	The Diamond	1-5	E. Peterson (5–0)	R. Farrar (4-4)	None	340	16-16	3–5
33	04/14/13	Temple*	The Diamond							
34	04/16/13	Maryland	The Diamond							
35	04/17/13	VMI	The Diamond							
36	04/19/13	at Dayton*	Woerner Field							
37	04/20/13	at Dayton*	Woerner Field							
38	04/21/13	at Dayton*	Woerner Field							
39	04/23/13	at Old Dominion (Hampton Classic)	War Memorial Stadium							
40	04/26/13	at La Salle*	DeVincent Field							
41	04/27/13	at La Salle*	DeVincent Field							
42	04/28/13	at La Salle*	DeVincent Field							
43	04/30/13	#7 Virginia	The Diamond							

May

#	Date	Opponent	Site/stadium	Score	Win	Loss	Save	Attendance	Overall record	CAA record
44	05/04/13	Saint Louis*	The Diamond							
45	05/05/13	Saint Louis*	The Diamond							
46	05/05/13	Saint Louis*	The Diamond							
47	05/08/13	at Maryland	Shipley Field							
48	05/10/13	at George Washington*	Barcroft Park							
49	05/11/13	at George Washington*	Barcroft Park							
50	05/12/13	at George Washington*	Barcroft Park							
51	05/14/13	at Virginia	Davenport Field							
52	05/16/13	Richmond*	The Diamond							
53	05/17/13	Richmond*	The Diamond							
54	05/18/13	Richmond*	The Diamond							

A10 Tournament

#	Date	Opponent	Site/stadium	Score	Win	Loss	Save	Attendance	Overall record	CAA record
55	05/22/13	TBD	Hayes Stadium						–	–
56	05/23/13	TBD	Hayes Stadium						–	–
57	05/24/13	TBD	Hayes Stadium						–	–
58	05/25/13	TBD	Hayes Stadium						–	–

* A-10 conference games.

== Rankings ==
Ranking movements Legend: ██ Increase in ranking ██ Decrease in ranking — = Not ranked RV = Received votes
	Week																			
Poll	Pre	1	2	3	4	5	6	7	8	9	10	11	12	13	14	15	16	17	18	Final
Coaches'	—	—*	—																	
Baseball America	—	—	—																	
Collegiate Baseball^	—	—	—																	
NCBWA†	—	—	RV																	

^ Collegiate Baseball ranked 40 teams in their preseason poll, but only ranked 30 teams weekly during the season.
† NCBWA ranks 30 teams in their preseason poll, but only ranks 25 teams weekly during the season.
* A new poll was not released for this week, so for comparison purposes, the previous week's ranking is inserted in this week's slot.

== See also ==
- VCU Rams
- VCU Rams baseball
- 2013 NCAA Division I baseball season
