= 2013 UMass Minutemen baseball team =

American college baseball season

2013 UMass Minutemen baseball
- Conference: Atlantic 10 Conference
- Record: 14–31 (7–17 A-10)
- Head coach: Mike Stone (26th season)
- Assistant coaches: Mike Sweeney; Dennis Accomando
- Home stadium: Earl Lorden Field

2013 Atlantic 10 Conference baseball standings
	Conf.						Overall
Team	W		L		T	PCT	W		L		T	PCT
Saint Louis ‍†‍‡‍^{y}	17	–	7	–	0	.708	41	–	21	–	0	.661
Charlotte ‍†‍‍	17	–	7	–	0	.708	37	–	23	–	0	.617
Rhode Island ‍†‍‍	17	–	7	–	0	.708	35	–	24	–	0	.593
Xavier ‍‍‍	16	–	8	–	0	.667	32	–	26	–	0	.552
George Washington ‍‍‍	15	–	9	–	0	.625	26	–	32	–	0	.448
La Salle ‍‍‍	15	–	9	–	0	.625	24	–	29	–	0	.453
Richmond ‍‍‍	13	–	11	–	0	.542	31	–	24	–	0	.564
VCU ‍‍‍	12	–	12	–	0	.500	28	–	26	–	0	.519
Saint Joseph's ‍‍‍	12	–	12	–	0	.500	26	–	26	–	0	.500
Butler ‍‍‍	12	–	12	–	0	.500	25	–	26	–	0	.490
St. Bonaventure ‍‍‍	9	–	15	–	0	.375	20	–	28	–	0	.417
Fordham ‍‍‍	8	–	16	–	0	.333	22	–	33	–	0	.400
Temple ‍‍‍	7	–	17	–	0	.292	18	–	28	–	0	.391
Massachusetts ‍‍‍	7	–	17	–	0	.292	14	–	31	–	0	.311
Dayton ‍‍‍	3	–	21	–	0	.125	11	–	39	–	1	.225
† – Conference champion ‡ – Tournament champion y – Invited to the NCAA tournament As of June 3, 2013; Rankings from Collegiate Baseball

The 2013 UMass Minutemen baseball team represented the University of Massachusetts Amherst in the 2013 NCAA Division I baseball season. Mike Stone is in his 26th season as head coach. The UMass baseball team, was coming off 2012 season in which they were 22-22. The Minutemen play their home games at Earl Lorden Field. Ultimately, the Minutemen finished the season with a 14–31 win-loss record overall.

== 2013 Roster ==
2013 UMass Minutemen Roster
Pitchers: 24 Aaron Plunkett - Junior; 17 Conor LeBlanc - Sophomore; 15 Evan Mackintosh - Freshman; 27 Jordan Pace - Senior; 22 Dan Stoops - Sophomore; 29 Rob O'Neil - Freshman; 28 DJ Jauss - Junior; 19 Tim Cassidy - Sophomore; 13 Ron Wallace - Senior; 18 Andrew Grant - Sophomore; 16 Pat Lia - Sophomore; 27 Tim Stoops- Sophomore; 25 Mason Trubey - Freshman	Infielders: 14 John Jennings - Freshman; 32 Bryan Dionicio - Sophomore; 39 Dylan Begin - Junior; 7 Rob McLam - Junior; 2 Ryan Cusick - Redshirt Junior; 44 Nik Campero - Junior; xx Mark Brodd - Freshman; 10 Zach Littman - Freshman; 11 Vinny Scifo - Freshman; 5 Nick Sanford - Junior; Utility: 9 Paul Yanakopulos - Sophomore	Catchers: 4 Billy Jones - Redshirt Freshman; 33 Ben Panunzio - Freshman; 31 Brandon Walsh - Freshman; Outfielders: 6 Kyle Adie - Junior; 8 Jeff Cavanaro - Sophomore; 34 Dan Jonah - Freshman; 12 Rich Graef - Senior; 3 Anthony Serino - Senior; 30 Kellen Pagel - Junior

== Schedule ==
2013 UMass Minutemen baseball game log
Regular season
March

Date	Opponent	Rank	Site/stadium	Score	Win	Loss	Save	Attendance	Overall record	A-10 record
March 1	#22 Notre Dame	–	USA Baseball National Training Complex	4–9	M. Ternowchek (1–0)	D. Jauss (0–1)	None	316	0-1	–
March 2	Tennessee	–	USA Baseball National Training Complex	4–6	B. Thomas (1–0)	C. LeBlanc (0–1)	T. Charpie(1)	250	0–2	–
March 3	Ohio	–	USA Baseball Nation Training Complex	7-6	J. Pace (1–0)	B. Barber (0–1)	None	150	1–2	–
March 8	at Lamar	–	Vincent–Beck Stadium	2-4	Harrington (4–0)	D. Jauss (0–2)	Carver(2)	536	1–3	–
March 9	at Lamar	–	Vincent–Beck Stadium	2-10	Chapman (3–0)	M. Trubey (0–1)	None	456	1-4	-
March 9	at Lamar	–	Vincent–Beck Stadium	0-8	Dziedzic (2–1)	A. Grant (0–1)	None	547	1-5	–
March 15	Seton Hall	–	Owen T. Carroll Field	0-9	J. Prosinski (2-2)	C. LeBlanc (0–2)	None	278	1-6	–
March 16	Manhattan	–	Owen T. Carroll Field	1-2	C. Liquori (1–0)	D. Stoops (0–1)	None	186	1-7	–
March 17	Manhattan	–	Owen T. Carroll Field	1-7	S. McClennan (1-1)	J. Pace (1-1)	None	136	1-8	–
March 17	Seton Hall	–	Owen T. Carroll Field	5-11	S. Burum (2–0)	A. Grant (0–2)	None	231	1-9	–
March 20	Hartford	–	Lorden Field	Postponed until April 17th due to weather						
March 22	at George Washington*	–	Barcroft Park	1-4	L. Staub (1–0)	D. Jauss (0–3)	C. Lejeune(2)	150	1-10	0–1
March 22	at George Washington*	–	Barcroft Park	1-7	A. Weisberg (1–0)	A. Grant (0–3)	None	150	1-11	0–2
March 24	at George Washington*	–	Barcroft Park	0–1	M. Kablow (2–3)	J. Pace (1–2)	C. Lejeune(3)	70	1–12	0–3
March 26	at Holy Cross	–	Fitton Field		Postponed due to weather					
March 29	NJIT	–	Lorden Field	10-4	D. Jauss (1–3)	T. Davis (0–4)	A. Plunkett(1)	221	2-12	0–3
March 30	NJIT	–	Lorden Field	1–0	A. Grant (1–3)	M. Leiter (3–4)	R. Wallace(1)	225	3-12	0–3
March 30	NJIT	–	Lorden Field	6-7	I. Bentley (1-1)	R. Wallace (0–1)	None	210	3-13	0–3

April

Date	Opponent	Rank	Site/stadium	Score	Win	Loss	Save	Attendance	Overall record	A-10 record
April 1	at Siena	-	Siena Baseball Field	4–8	B. Goossens (1–3)	A. Plunkett (0–1)	N. Fyer(3)	100	3-14	0–3
April 3	at Northeastern	-	Parsons Field	1-3	J. Mulry (1–0)	C. LeBlanc (0–3)	D. Maki(4)	57	3-15	0–3
April 5	at Rhode Island*	-	Bill Beck Field	2-9	M. Bradstreet (4–3)	D. Jauss (1–4)	None	204	3-16	0–4
April 6	at Rhode Island*	-	Bill Beck Field	2-0	A. Grant (2–3)	S. Furney (3-3)	None	240	4-16	1–4
April 7	at Rhode Island*	-	Bill Beck Field	1-3	B. Dean (2–1)	J. Pace (1–3)	S. Moyers(1)	219	4-17	1–5
April 10	Boston College (Beanpot Baseball Tournament Semi-Final)	-	Lorden Field	11-6	E. Macintosh (1–0)	J. Adams (0–1)	None	236	5-17	1–5
April 13	St. Bonaventure*	-	Lorden Field	3-4	A. Revello (3–4)	A. Grant (2–4)	C. Grey(1)	197	5-18	1–6
April 13	St. Bonaventure*	-	Lorden Field	9-3	J. Pace (2–3)	A. Johnson (1-1)	None	197	6-18	2–6
April 14	St. Bonaventure*	-	Lorden Field	6-5	R. Wallace (1-1)	J. Rosencrance (2-2)	None	200	7-18	3–6
April 16	Central Connecticut	-	Lorden Field	9-5	D. Stoops (1-1)	M. Pastore (0–1)	None	190	8-18	3–6
April 17	Hartford	-	Lorden Field	4-3	J. Pace (3-3)	J. Charles (0–1)	None	150	9-18	3–6
April 19	at La Salle*	-	Hank DeVincent Field	5-17	Donohue (2–3)	A. Grant (2–5)	None	118	9-19	3–7
April 20	at La Salle*	-	Hank DeVincent Field	7-9	Clark (2–1)	J. Pace (3–4)	Christensen(7)	142	9-20	3–8
April 21	at La Salle*	-	Hank DeVincent Field	2-6	Hollman (3-3)	C. LeBlanc (0–4)	Christensen(8)	134	9-21	3–9
April 23	at Connecticut	-	J. O. Christian Field	4-5	Catalina (1–0)	A. Plunkett (0–2)	Tabakman(5)	90	9-22	3–9
April 26	St. Joseph's*	-	Lorden Field	4-7	L. Veeder (1–0)	A. Plunkett (0–3)	J. Yacobinis(6)	140	9-23	3–10
April 27	St. Joseph's*	-	Lorden Field	10-4	C. LeBlanc (1–4)	Carter (3-3)	None	201	10-23	4–10
April 28	St. Joseph's*	-	Lorden Field	5-10	Thorpe (4–6)	J. Pace (3–5)	Yacabonis(7)	213	10-24	4–11
April 29	Northeastern (Beanpot Baseball Tournament Final)	-	Fenway Park	3-6	Cook (2–0)	A. Plunkett (0–4)	Foster(1)	1,563	10-25	4–11

May

Date	Opponent	Rank	Site/stadium	Score	Win	Loss	Save	Attendance	Overall record	A-10 record
May 1	at Quinnipiac	-	Quinnipiac Baseball Field	11-8	R. Wallace (2–1)	Musco (0–3)	J. Pace(1)	135	11-25	4–11
May 3	Fordham*	-	Lorden Field	5-12	Charest (2–8)	A. Grant (2–6)	None	125	11-26	4–12
May 4	Fordham*	-	Lorden Field	1-2	Pike (3–6)	C. LeBlanc (1–5)	None	202	11-27	4–13
May 5	Fordham*	-	Lorden Field	9-11	Reich (2–0)	A. Plunkett (0–5)	None	151	11-28	4–14
May 10	at Xavier*	-	J. Page Hayden Field	3-4	KLEVER (5–4)	LeBlanc (1–6)	VICE (7)	389	11-29	4–15
May 11	at Xavier*	-	J. Page Hayden Field	3-15	J. Richard (8–3)	A. Grant (2–7)	None	250	11-30	4–16
May 12	at Xavier*	-	J. Page Hayden Field	0-1	Koors (5-5)	A. Plunkett (0–6)	None	316	11-31	4–17
May 16	at Temple*	-	Skip Wilson Field	4-3	C. LeBlanc (2–6)	P. Peterson (2–7)	J. Pace(2)	193	12-31	5–17
May 17	at Temple*	-	Skip Wilson Field	6-3	A. Grant (3–7)	E. Peterson (6–3)	J. Pace(3)	178	13-31	6–17
May 18	at Temple*	-	Skip Wilson Field	11-9	A. Plunkett (1–6)	Moller (1–7)	None	178	14-31	7–17

Rankings from USA TODAY/ESPN Top 25 coaches' baseball poll. Parenthesis indicate tournament seedings.
*Atlantic 10 Conference games
