= 2013 Rhode Island Rams baseball team =

American college baseball season

2013 Rhode Island Rams baseball
- Conference: Atlantic 10 Conference
- Record: 35–24 (17–7 A-10)
- Head coach: Jim Foster (8th season)
- Assistant coaches: Raphael Cerrato; Matt Untiet; Mike Walsh
- Home stadium: Bill Beck Field

2013 Atlantic 10 Conference baseball standings
	Conf.						Overall
Team	W		L		T	PCT	W		L		T	PCT
Saint Louis ‍†‍‡‍^{y}	17	–	7	–	0	.708	41	–	21	–	0	.661
Charlotte ‍†‍‍	17	–	7	–	0	.708	37	–	23	–	0	.617
Rhode Island ‍†‍‍	17	–	7	–	0	.708	35	–	24	–	0	.593
Xavier ‍‍‍	16	–	8	–	0	.667	32	–	26	–	0	.552
George Washington ‍‍‍	15	–	9	–	0	.625	26	–	32	–	0	.448
La Salle ‍‍‍	15	–	9	–	0	.625	24	–	29	–	0	.453
Richmond ‍‍‍	13	–	11	–	0	.542	31	–	24	–	0	.564
VCU ‍‍‍	12	–	12	–	0	.500	28	–	26	–	0	.519
Saint Joseph's ‍‍‍	12	–	12	–	0	.500	26	–	26	–	0	.500
Butler ‍‍‍	12	–	12	–	0	.500	25	–	26	–	0	.490
St. Bonaventure ‍‍‍	9	–	15	–	0	.375	20	–	28	–	0	.417
Fordham ‍‍‍	8	–	16	–	0	.333	22	–	33	–	0	.400
Temple ‍‍‍	7	–	17	–	0	.292	18	–	28	–	0	.391
Massachusetts ‍‍‍	7	–	17	–	0	.292	14	–	31	–	0	.311
Dayton ‍‍‍	3	–	21	–	0	.125	11	–	39	–	1	.225
† – Conference champion ‡ – Tournament champion y – Invited to the NCAA tournament As of June 3, 2013; Rankings from Collegiate Baseball

The 2013 Rhode Island Rams baseball team represented the University of Rhode Island in the 2013 NCAA Division I baseball season. Jim Foster was in his 8th season as head coach of the Rams. The URI baseball team, was coming off 2012 season in which they were 33–25–1. The Rams play their home games at Bill Beck Field.

== 2013 roster ==
2013 Rhode Island Rams roster
Pitchers: 4 Brendan Doonan – Redshirt Sophomore; 6 Kris Selvaggi – Redshirt Junior; 9 Mike Bradstreet – Senior; 10 Nick Narodowy – Junior; 14 Steve Moyers – Freshman; 15 Rob Curran – Redshirt Senior; 19 Bobby Dean – Redshirt Senior; 21 Cole Warren – Redshirt Sophomore; 25 Max Herrmann – Freshman; 26 Ty Sterner – Sophomore; 29 Brad Applin – Freshman; 32 Liam O'Sullivan – Junior; 35 Milan Mantle – Junior; 36 Tyler Bowditch – Junior; 37 Brian Russell – Freshman; 40 Sean Furney – Senior; 41 Ben Wessel – Freshman	Infielders: 1 Tim Caputo – Sophomore; 3 Connor Foreman – Freshman; 7 Mike LeBel – Redshirt Senior; 8 Joe Landi – Junior; 12 Regan Aghdam – Freshman; 16 Lou Distasio – Freshman; 23 TJ Lynch – Freshman; 24 Pat Fortunato – Redshirt Senior; Utility: 28 Kevin Stenhouse – Senior	Catchers: 11 Shane O'Connell – Redshirt Junior; 13 Chase Livingston – Freshman; 38 Derek Gardella – Redshirt Freshman; Outfielders: 2 Jeff Roy – Junior; 17 Chris Famiglietti – Redshirt Senior; 22 Ryan Olmo – Freshman; 27 Jesse Lee – Freshman

== Schedule ==
2013 Rhode Island Rams Baseball game log
Regular season
February

Date	Opponent	Rank	Site/stadium	Score	Win	Loss	Save	Attendance	Overall record	A-10 record
February 15	at Florida State	–	Dick Howser Stadium	5–11	B. Leibrandt (1–0)	M. Bradstreet (0–1)	None	5,354	0–1	–
February 16	at Florida State	–	Dick Howser Stadium	2–6	B. Johnson (1–0)	N. Narodowy (0–1)	None	5,229	0–2	–
February 17	at Florida State	–	Dick Howser Stadium	6–8	G. Smith (1–0)	B. Doonan (0–1)	None	4,183	0–3	–
February 22	at Ole Miss	–	Swayze Field	1–8	B. Wahl (2–0)	M. Bradstreet (0–2)	None	9,333	0–4	–
February 23	at Ole Miss	–	Swayze Field	0–1	B. Huber (1–0)	T. Sterner (0–1)	None	7,390	0–5	–
February 24	at Ole Miss	–	Swayze Field	3–5	A. Greenwood (2–0)	L. O'Sullivan (0–1)	B. Huber(3)	7,121	0–6	–
February 26	at Mississippi State	–	Dudy Noble Field	2–13	Girodo (2–0)	M. Mantle (0–1)	None	5,945	0–7	–
February 27	at Mississippi State	–	Dudy Noble Field	5–17	R. Mitchell (3–0)	T. Sterner (0–2)	None	6,343	0–8	–

March

Date	Opponent	Rank	Site/stadium	Score	Win	Loss	Save	Attendance	Overall record	A-10 record
March 1	Virginia Tech	–	USA Baseball National Training Complex	3–7	J. Joyce (2–1)	S. Furney (0–1)	None	227	0–9	–
March 2	Ohio	–	USA Baseball National Training Complex	3–0	M. Bradstreet (1–0)	Paliotto (0–3)	None	250	1–9	–
March 3	Notre Dame	–	USA Baseball Nation Training Complex	4–3	B. Dean (1–0)	N. McCarty (2–1)	None	321	2–9	–
March 10	at East Tennessee State	–	Thomas Stadium	0–5	Doane (3–0)	S. Furney (0–2)	None	562	2–10	–
March 12	at Wake Forest	–	Gene Hooks Field	5–9	N. Jones (2–0)	L. O'Sullivan (0–2)	None	138	2–11	–
March 13	at UNC Greensboro	–	UNCG Baseball Stadium	18–8	S. Moyers (1–0)	B. Browne (0–1)	None	168	3–11	–
March 15	at Winthrop	–	Winthrop Ballpark	4–0	M. Bradstreet (2–2)	M. Pierpont (1–3)	None	350	4–11	–
March 16	at Winthrop	–	Winthrop Ballpark	4–2	S. Furney (1–2)	S. Kmiec (0–3)	B. Dean(1)	452	5–11	–
March 17	at Winthrop	–	Winthrop Ballpark	2–1	S. Moyers (2–0)	T. Klitsch (1–3)	B. Dean(2)	136	6–11	–
March 19	Sacred Heart	–	Bill Beck Field	Postponed due to weather						
March 20	Stony Brook	–	Bill Beck Field	8–4	M. Mantle (1–1)	B. Tatelman (0–2)	None	150	7–11	–
March 23	Hofstra	–	Bill Beck Field	11–1	M. Bradstreet (3–2)	D. D'Errico (0–1)	None	209	8–11	–
March 23	Hofstra	–	Bill Beck Field	2–0	S. Furney (2–2)	J. Burg (2–2)	B. Dean(3)	240	9–11	–
March 24	Hofstra	–	Bill Beck Field	1–3	Jesch (2–1)	S. Moyers (2–1)	None	214	9–12	–
March 26	UMass Lowell	–	Bill Beck Field	10–0	M. Mantle (2–1)	G. Cole (1–3)	None	135	10–12	–
March 29	Dayton*	–	Bill Beck Field	2–6	P. Schrage (1–4)	M. Bradstreet (3–3)	None	209	10–13	0–1
March 30	Dayton*	–	Bill Beck Field	4–0	S. Furney (3–2)	N. Buettgen (1–4)	None	240	11–13	1–1
March 31	Dayton*	–	Bill Beck Field	3–6	J. Wahl (1–3)	B. Dean (1–1)	N. Weybright(3)	214	11–14	1–2

April

Date	Opponent	Rank	Site/stadium	Score	Win	Loss	Save	Attendance	Overall record	A-10 record
April 2	at Northeastern	–	Parsons Field	4–2	M. Mantle (3–1)	Lippert (2–1)	B. Dean(4)	36	12–14	1–2
April 3	Central Connecticut	–	Bill Beck Field	0–4	R. Anderson (1–1)	B. Russel (0–1)	None	137	12–15	1–2
April 5	Massachusetts*	–	Bill Beck Field	9–2	M. Bradstreet (4–3)	D. Jauss (1–4)	None	204	13–15	2–2
April 6	Massachusetts*	–	Bill Beck Field	0–2	A. Grant (2–3)	S. Furney (3–3)	None	240	13–16	2–3
April 7	Massachusetts*	–	Bill Beck Field	3–1	B. Dean (2–1)	J. Pace (1–3)	S. Moyers(1)	219	14–16	3–3
April 9	Quinnipiac	–	Bill Beck Field	7–3	R. Curran (1–0)	K. Musco (0–2)	None	215	15–16	3–3
April 10	at Bryant	–	Conaty Park	1–8	J. Michaud (3–2)	L. Distasio (0–1)	None	200	15–17	3–3
April 12	at Fordham*	–	Houlihan Park	4–3	M. Bradstreet (5–3)	J. Charest (1–6)	None	150	16–17	4–3
April 13	at Fordham*	–	Houlihan Park	4–3	S. Furney (4–3)	C. Pike (1–6)	B. Dean(5)	221	17–17	5–3
April 14	at Fordham*	–	Houlihan Park	4–2	B. Applin (1–0)	J. Murphy (0–1)	B. Dean(6)	204	18–17	6–3
April 16	at Boston College	–	Shea Field	3–2	R. Curran (2–0)	G. Goman (2–5)	B. Dean(7)	478	19–17	6–3
April 19	Temple*	–	Bill Beck Field	3–0	M. Bradstreet (6–3)	P. Peterson (5–1)	B. Dean(8)	109	20–17	7–3
April 20	Temple*	–	Bill Beck Field	3–1	S. Furney (5–3)	E. Peterson (5–1)	B. Applin(1)	329	21–17	8–3
April 21	Temple*	–	Bill Beck Field	6–2	B. Doonan (1–1)	M. Hockenberry (1–2)	None	204	22–17	9–3
April 24	at Hartford	–	Fiondella Field	7–1	M. Mantle (4–1)	L. Carter (0–3)	None	150	23–17	9–3
April 24	at Hartford	–	Fiondella Field	8–2	T. Bowditch (1–0)	McKay (3–1)	None	167	24–17	9–3
April 26	at Xavier*	–	J. Page Hayden Field	0–2	J. Richard (7–2)	M. Bradstreet (6–4)	None	313	24–18	9–4
April 27	at Xavier*	–	J. Page Hayden Field	0–1	Bodner (3–1)	Applin (1–1)	None	250	24–19	9–5
April 27	at Xavier*	–	J. Page Hayden Field	6–2	B. Dean (3–1)	Campbell (0–1)	None	422	25–19	10–5
April 30	Boston College	–	Bill Beck Field	7–8	N. Poore (1–2)	Doonan (1–2)	J. Gormon(1)	127	25–20	10–5

May

Date	Opponent	Rank	Site/stadium	Score	Win	Loss	Save	Attendance	Overall record	A-10 record
May 2	at Brown	–	Murray Stadium	5–2	R. Curran (3–0)	T. Wright (0–2)	None	82	26–20	10–5
May 3	St. Bonaventure*	–	Bill Beck Field	1–2	A. Revello (5–5)	M. Bradstreet (6–5)	A. Johnson(2)	209	26–21	10–6
May 4	St. Bonaventure*	–	Bill Beck Field	3–2	R. Curran (4–0)	R. Winston (4–2)	None	328	27–21	11–6
May 5	St. Bonaventure*	–	Bill Beck Field	7–0	S. Moyers (3–1)	E. Gray (0–6)	None	324	28–21	12–6
May 10	at Butler*	–	Bulldog Park	4–5	Allen (3–1)	R. Curran (4–1)	Byerly(8)	112	28–22	12–7
May 11	at Butler*	–	Bulldog Park	8–3	S. Furney (6–3)	Kramp (7–4)	None	213	29–22	13–7
May 12	at Butler*	–	Bulldog Park	17–1	S. Moyers (4–1)	Johnson (0–3)	None	219	30–22	14–7
May 14	Connecticut	–	Bill Beck Field	7–3	M. Mantle (5–1)	Colletti (3–2)	None	3,124	31–22	14–7
May 16	at St. Joseph's*	–	Campbell's Field	4–1	Bradstreet (7–5)	Mullen (8–4)	Applin(2)	216	32–22	15–7
May 17	at Saint Joseph's*	–	Campbell's Field	13–8	S. Furney (7–3)	Thorpe (5–7)	None	208	33–22	16–7
May 18	at Saint Joseph's*	–	Campbell's Field	10–5	T. Bowditch (2–0)	Carter (3–5)	None	400	34–22	17–7

A-10 Tournament

Date	Opponent	Rank	Site/stadium	Score	Win	Loss	Save	Attendance	Tournament record
May 22	La Salle	–	Hayes Stadium	5–2	M. Bradstreet (8–5)	O'Neill (5–7)	None	–	1–0
May 23	Charlotte	–	Hayes Stadium	2–5	J. Hamilton (6–3)	S. Furney (7–4)	None	–	1–1
May 23	George Washington	–	Hayes Stadium	4–5	L. Olson (1–2)	B. Dean (3–2)	None	678	1–2

Rankings from USA TODAY/ESPN Top 25 coaches' baseball poll. Parenthesis indicate tournament seedings.
*Atlantic 10 Conference games

== Radio feed ==
The program's games were broadcast on WRIU.
