= 2013 Atlantic 10 Conference baseball tournament =

American college baseball tournament

- Teams: 7
- Format: Double-elimination
- Finals site: Robert and Mariam Hayes Stadium; Charlotte, NC
- Champions: Saint Louis (3rd title)
- Winning coach: Darin Hendrickson (2nd title)
- MVP: Alex Kelly (Saint Louis)

2013 Atlantic 10 Conference baseball standings
	Conf.						Overall
Team	W		L		T	PCT	W		L		T	PCT
Saint Louis ‍†‍‡‍^{y}	17	–	7	–	0	.708	41	–	21	–	0	.661
Charlotte ‍†‍‍	17	–	7	–	0	.708	37	–	23	–	0	.617
Rhode Island ‍†‍‍	17	–	7	–	0	.708	35	–	24	–	0	.593
Xavier ‍‍‍	16	–	8	–	0	.667	32	–	26	–	0	.552
George Washington ‍‍‍	15	–	9	–	0	.625	26	–	32	–	0	.448
La Salle ‍‍‍	15	–	9	–	0	.625	24	–	29	–	0	.453
Richmond ‍‍‍	13	–	11	–	0	.542	31	–	24	–	0	.564
VCU ‍‍‍	12	–	12	–	0	.500	28	–	26	–	0	.519
Saint Joseph's ‍‍‍	12	–	12	–	0	.500	26	–	26	–	0	.500
Butler ‍‍‍	12	–	12	–	0	.500	25	–	26	–	0	.490
St. Bonaventure ‍‍‍	9	–	15	–	0	.375	20	–	28	–	0	.417
Fordham ‍‍‍	8	–	16	–	0	.333	22	–	33	–	0	.400
Temple ‍‍‍	7	–	17	–	0	.292	18	–	28	–	0	.391
Massachusetts ‍‍‍	7	–	17	–	0	.292	14	–	31	–	0	.311
Dayton ‍‍‍	3	–	21	–	0	.125	11	–	39	–	1	.225
† – Conference champion ‡ – Tournament champion y – Invited to the NCAA tournament As of June 3, 2013; Rankings from Collegiate Baseball

The 2013 Atlantic 10 Conference baseball tournament was the postseason baseball tournament of the NCAA Division I Atlantic 10 Conference. It took place from May 22 through 25. The top seven regular season finishers of the league's fifteen teams met in the double-elimination tournament to be held at newly renovated Robert and Mariam Hayes Stadium on the campus of the University of North Carolina at Charlotte in Charlotte, North Carolina. In the championship game, first-seeded Saint Louis defeated second-seeded Charlotte, 7-4, to win its third tournament championship (its second under head coach Darin Hendrickson). Saint Louis earned the conference's automatic bid to the 2013 NCAA Division I baseball tournament. As a team, SLU collected 92 hits in six days (.395 average), shattering the previous A-10 Tournament record of 65.

== Seeding and format ==
In an expansion from previous years, the top seven finishers from the regular season were seeded one through seven. The top seed received a single bye while remaining seeds played on the first day.

Team	W	L	Pct.	GB	Seed
Saint Louis	17	7	.708	–	1
Charlotte	17	7	.708	–	2
Rhode Island	17	7	.708	–	3
Xavier	16	8	.667	1	4
George Washington	15	9	.625	2	5
La Salle	15	9	.625	2	6
Richmond	13	11	.542	4	7
VCU	12	12	.500	5	–
Saint Joseph's	12	12	.500	5	–
Butler	12	12	.500	5	–
St. Bonaventure	9	15	.375	8	–
Fordham	8	16	.333	9	–
Temple	7	17	.292	10	–
UMass	7	17	.292	10	–
Dayton	3	21	.125	14	–

== Bracket ==
Upper round 1	Upper round 2	Upper final	Final
1	Saint Louis	6
4	Xavier	7
4	Xavier	8
5	George Washington	2
4	Xavier	3
2	Charlotte	12
2	Charlotte	6
7	Richmond	5
2	Charlotte	5
3	Rhode Island	2
3	Rhode Island	5
6	La Salle	2	2	Charlotte	4	4
1	Saint Louis	5	7
Lower round 1	Lower round 2	Lower round 3	Lower final
1	Saint Louis	10
7	Richmond	7	7	Richmond	6	4	Xavier	4
6	La Salle	2	1	Saint Louis	13	1	Saint Louis	6
5	George Washington	4
3	Rhode Island	4
5	George Washington	5

== All-Tournament Team ==
The following players were named to the All-Tournament Team.

POS	Name	School	Class
P	Mike Bradstreet	Rhode Island	SR
P	Marco Mejia	Saint Louis	SR
P	John Hamilton	Charlotte	SR
OF/P	Vinny Nittoli	Xavier	JR
1B	Derek Brown	George Washington	SR
1B	Mike Vigliarolo	Saint Louis	SO
2B	Brad Elwood	Charlotte	SO
SS	Tyler Beckwith	Richmond	FR
OF	Mark Elwell	Xavier	SR
OF	Alex Kelly	Saint Louis	SR
OF	Michael Bozarth	Saint Louis	FR
OF	Tony Montlbano	Charlotte	SR

=== Most Valuable Player ===
Alex Kelly was named Tournament Most Valuable Player. Kelly was a senior outfielder for Saint Louis who set tournament records for hits (12) and RBI (13).
