= 2013 Columbia Lions baseball team =

American college baseball season

2013 Columbia Lions baseball

Ivy League champions Lou Gehrig Division Champions

Fullerton Regional, 1–2
- Conference: Ivy League
- Record: 26–19 (16–4 Ivy)
- Head coach: Brett Boretti (8th season)
- Assistant coaches: Pete Maki (6th season); Jim Walsh (8th season); Dan Tischler (1st season)
- Home stadium: Robertson Field at Satow Stadium

2013 Ivy League baseball standings
	Conf.				Overall
Team	W		L	PCT	W		L	PCT
Lou Gehrig
Columbia ^{x}‍‍‡‍^{y}	16	–	4	.800	28	–	20	.583
Cornell ‍‍‍	11	–	9	.550	23	–	17	.575
Princeton ‍‍‍	11	–	9	.550	14	–	28	.333
Penn ‍‍‍	7	–	13	.350	22	–	21	.512
Red Rolfe
Dartmouth ^{x}‍‍‍	15	–	5	.750	32	–	9	.780
Yale ‍‍‍	10	–	10	.500	13	–	25	.342
Harvard ‍‍‍	7	–	13	.350	10	–	31	.244
Brown ‍‍‍	3	–	17	.150	7	–	33	.175
x – Division champion ‡ – Championship Series champion y – Invited to the NCAA tournament As of June 30, 2013; Rankings from Collegiate Baseball

The 2013 Columbia Lions baseball team represented Columbia University in the 2013 NCAA Division I baseball season. The Lions played their home games at Robertson Field at Satow Stadium at the northern tip of Manhattan in New York, New York. The team was coached by Brett Boretti, leading his eighth season at Columbia.

The Lions won the Lou Gehrig Division, then swept Dartmouth in the 2013 Ivy League Baseball Championship Series to claim the Lions' 11th Ivy League crown, and first since 2008.

== Roster ==
2013 Columbia Lions roster
Pitchers: 2 Robbins, Willis - Freshman; 5 Martin, George - Freshman; 13 Robinson, Matt - Freshman; 15 Spinosa, David - Freshman; 17 Tax, Zack - Junior; 19 Donino, Joey - Junior; 22 Roy, Kevin - Freshman; 23 Speer, David - Junior; 28 Kleban, Ricky - Senior; 29 Olson, Stefan - Senior; 33 Gandolfo, Joey - Junior; 34 Crispi, Thomas - Freshman; 36 Cline, Adam - Freshman; 37 Weisman, Mike - Freshman; 45 Giel, Tim - Senior	Infielders: 3 Serena, Jordan - Sophomore; 9 Kinne, John - Freshman; 10 Silbar, Aaron - Junior; 11 Crucet, Nick - Senior; 12 Williams, Eric - Senior; 18 Vandercook, David - Sophomore; 27 Black, Alex - Senior; 30 Maguire, Nick - Freshman; Catchers: 4 Fischer, Mike - Junior; 24 Boyher, Logan - Freshman	Outfielders: 25 Craig, Gus - Sophomore; 16 Falcone, Joey - Sophomore; 6 Ferraresi, Nick - Senior

== Coaches ==
2013 Columbia Lions baseball coaching staff
- Brett Boretti - Head Coach (8th season)
- Pete Maki - Associate head coach (6th season)
- Dan Tischler - Assistant Coach (1st season)
- Jim Walsh - Assistant Coach (8th season)

== Schedule ==
2013 Columbia Lions baseball game log
Regular season

March
Date	Opponent	Site/stadium	Score	Win	Loss	Save	Attendance	Overall record	Ivy Record
March 1	@ Lamar	Vincent–Beck Stadium • Beaumont, TX	L 1–5	Harrington (3–0)	Speer (0–1)	None	425	0–1	0–0
March 2	@ Lamar	Vincent–Beck Stadium • Beaumont, TX	L 5–7		Cline (0–1)			0–2	0–0
March 2	@ Lamar	Vincent–Beck Stadium • Beaumont, TX	L 5–9	Dziedzic (1–1)	Gandolfo (0–1)	None	622	0–3	0–0
March 3	@ Lamar	Vincent–Beck Stadium • Beaumont, TX	L 0–6	Carver (2–1)	Giel (0–1)	None	537	0–4	0–0
March 8	@ #18 Arizona	Hi Corbett Field • Tucson, AZ	L 3–4	Troupe (1–0)	Crispi (0–1)	None	1,653	0–5	0–0
March 9	@ #18 Arizona	Hi Corbett Field • Tucson, AZ	W 8–4	Donino (1–0)	Farris (3–1)	None	1,688	1–5	0–0
March 10	@ #18 Arizona	Hi Corbett Field • Tucson, AZ	L 5–7	Troupe (2–0)	Crispi (0–2)	None	2,188	1–6	0–0
March 15	@ UCF	Jay Bergman Field • Orlando, FL	L 3–10	Lively (4–1)	Speer (0–2)	None	1,553	1–7	0–0
March 16	@ UCF	Jay Bergman Field • Orlando, FL	W 5–4	Crispi (1–2)	Davis (2–1)	Black (1)	1,230	2–7	0–0
March 17	@ UCF	Jay Bergman Field • Orlando, FL	L 1–6	Adkins (1–3)	Cline (0–2)	None	1,385	2–8	0–0
March 18	@ UCF	Jay Bergman Field • Orlando, FL	L 1–5	Skoglund (1–3)	Crispi (1–3)	None	1,145	2–9	0–0
March 19	@ Miami (FL)	Alex Rodriguez Park at Mark Light Field • Coral Gables, FL	L 6–9	Whaley (1–1)	Spinosa (0–1)	Nedeljkovic (3)	2,350	2–10	0–0
March 20	@ Miami (FL)	Mark Light Field • Coral Gables, FL	L 4–6	Woodrey (3–0)	Black (0–1)	Nedeljkovic (4)	2,300	2–11	0–0
March 22	NYIT	Robertson Field at Satow Stadium • New York, NY	W 2–1	Speer (1–2)	Checo (1–3)	None	104	3–11	0–0
March 22	NYIT	Robertson Field at Satow Stadium • New York, NY	W 2–0	Cline (1–2)	Lipovac (0–1)	Donino (1)	104	4–11	0–0
March 23	@ Army	Johnson Stadium at Doubleday Field • West Point, NY	W 5–1	Giel (1–1)	Davidson (1–2)	None	112	5–11	0–0
March 24	vs. NYIT	Johnson Stadium at Doubleday Field • West Point, NY	W 9–4	Donino (2–0)	Bulva (1–3)	None	119	6–11	0–0
March 27	Manhattan	Robertson Field at Satow Stadium • New York, NY	W 6–3	Tax (1–0)	Jordan (1–4)	None	108	7–11	0–0
March 27	Manhattan	Robertson Field at Satow Stadium • New York, NY	L 0–4	Abbate (1–0)	Roy (0–1)	None	108	7–12	0–0
March 30	Harvard	Robertson Field at Satow Stadium • New York, NY	W 5–0	Speer (2–2)	Dodge (0–5)	None	256	8–12	1–0
March 30	Harvard	Robertson Field at Satow Stadium • New York, NY	W 3–2	Tax (2–0)	Timoney (0–2)	None	256	9–12	2–0
March 31	Dartmouth	Robertson Field at Satow Stadium • New York, NY	L 2–3	Horacek (4–0)	Giel (1–2)	Olson (6)	298	9–13	2–1
March 31	Dartmouth	Robertson Field at Satow Stadium • New York, NY	L 4–7	Johnson (4–0)	Cline (1–3)	None	298	9–14	2–2

April
Date	Opponent	Site/stadium	Score	Win	Loss	Save	Attendance	Overall record	Ivy Record
April 2	@ Rutgers	Bainton Field • Piscataway, NJ	L 6–15	Roe (1–1)	Gandolfo (0–2)	None	47	9–15	2–2
April 6	@ Yale	Yale Field • New Haven, CT	W 2–1	Speer (3–2)	Cerfolio (1–3)	Black (2)	201	10–15	3–2
April 6	@ Yale	Yale Field • New Haven, CT	W 5–2	Donino (3–0)	Coleman (1–4)	Weisman (1)	190	11–15	4–2
April 7	@ Brown	Murray Stadium • Providence, RI	W 2–0	Giel (2–2)	Carlow (0–4)	None	107	12–15	5–2
April 7	@ Brown	Murray Stadium • Providence, RI	W 13–4	Cline (2–3)	St. Lawrence (0–4)	None	103	13–15	6–2
April 9	St. John's	Robertson Field at Satow Stadium • New York, NY	W 5–3	Tax (3–0)	Christopher (1–1)	Black (3)	186	14–15	6–2
April 13	Cornell	Robertson Field at Satow Stadium • New York, NY	W 8–1	Speer (4–2)	Busto (4–1)	None	378	15–15	7–2
April 13	Cornell	Robertson Field at Satow Stadium • New York, NY	W 5–0	Donino (4–0)	Jones (4–1)	Weisman (2)	378	17–15	8–2
April 14	Cornell	Robertson Field at Satow Stadium • New York, NY	L 4–5^{10}	Upton (2–1)	Tax (3–1)	Horton (2)	325	16–16	8–3
April 14	Cornell	Robertson Field at Satow Stadium • New York, NY	W 5–2	Cline (3–3)	McCulley (3–1)	Olson (1)	325	17–16	9–3
April 20	@ Princeton	Bill Clarke Field • Princeton, NJ	W 4–0	Speer (5–2)	Hermans (3–3)	None	417	18–16	10–3
April 20	@ Princeton	Bill Clarke Field • Princeton, NJ	W 7–1	Donino (6–0)	Link (1–3)	Weisman (3)	417	19–16	11–3
April 21	@ Princeton	Bill Clarke Field • Princeton, NJ	L 0–2	Ford (5–0)	Giel (2–3)	None	403	19–17	11–4
April 21	@ Princeton	Bill Clarke Field • Princeton, NJ	W 10–2	Roy (1–1)	Mingo (0–4)	Olson (2)	403	20–17	12–4
April 24	@ Fordham	Jim Houlihan Park at Jack Coffey Field • Bronx, NY	L 4–5	Kennedy (3–2)	Olson (0–1)	None	201	20–18	12–4
April 24	@ Fordham	Jim Houlihan Park at Jack Coffey Field • Bronx, NY	L 3–9	Anastasi (2–3)	Weisman (0–1)	None	201	20–19	12–4
April 26	Penn	Robertson Field at Satow Stadium • New York, NY	W 3–2	Speer (6–2)	Beasley (1–2)	None	423	21–19	13–4
April 26	Penn	Robertson Field at Satow Stadium • New York, NY	W 14–1	Donino (6–0)	McGarry (4–4)	None	423	22–19	14–4
April 27	@ Penn	Meiklejohn Stadium • Philadelphia, PA	W 1–0	Giel (3–3)	Gautieri (5–3)	Black (4)	227	23–19	15–4
April 27	@ Penn	Meiklejohn Stadium • Philadelphia, PA	W 6–4	Roy (2–1)	Thomson (2–3)	Olson (3)	241	24–19	16–4

Postseason

Ivy League Championship Series
Date	Opponent	Site/stadium	Score	Win	Loss	Save	Attendance	Overall record	Champ Record
May 4	Dartmouth	Robertson Field at Satow Stadium • New York, NY	W 6–5^{10}	Roy (3–1)	Sulser (5–3)	None	952	25–19	1–0
May 4	Dartmouth	Robertson Field at Satow Stadium • New York, NY	W 12–5	Olson (1–1)	Danielak (1–1)	None	952	26–19	2–0

May
Date	Opponent	Site/stadium	Score	Win	Loss	Save	Attendance	Overall record
May 20	Sacred Heart	Robertson Field at Satow Stadium • New York, NY	W 9–2	Tax (4–1)	Wertz (3–3)	None	107	27–19

NCAA Fullerton Regional
Date	Opponent	Site/stadium	Score	Win	Loss	Save	Attendance	Overall record	NCAAT record
May 31	(1) #5 Cal State Fulerton	Goodwin Field • Fullerton, CA	L 1–4	Wiest (9–3)	Speer (6–3)	None	3,183	27–20	0–1
June 1	(3) New Mexico	Goodwin Field • Fullerton, CA	W 6–5^{13}	Donino (7–0)	Mathis (0–5)	Black (5)	1,268	28–20	1–1
June 2	(2) Arizona State	Goodwin Field • Fullerton, CA	L 5–10	Blackford (5–1)	Olson (1–2)	Dunbar (3)	1,279	28–21	1–2
