= David Miller (baseball) =

American baseball coach (born 1973)

Current position
- Title: Head coach
- Team: La Salle
- Conference: Atlantic 10
- Record: 100–133

Biographical details
- Born: December 9, 1973 (age 52); Philadelphia, Pennsylvania, U.S.

Playing career
- 1993–1995: Clemson
- 1996: Kinston Indians
- 1997: Akron Aeros
- 1998–2000: Buffalo Bisons
- 2000: Akron Aeros
- 2000: Greenville Braves
- 2002: Chattanooga Lookouts
- 2003: Camden Riversharks
- Position: First baseman / Outfielder

Coaching career (HC unless noted)
- 2003: Hawaii–Hilo (asst.)
- 2009: Rutgers–Camden (asst.)
- 2010–2011: Villanova (asst.)
- 2012–2013: William & Mary (asst.)
- 2014–2017: William Penn Charter School
- 2018–2021: La Salle
- 2022: Penn State Abington
- 2023–2024: Manhattan
- 2026–present: La Salle

Head coaching record
- Overall: 177–208 (.460)
- Tournaments: NCAA: 0–0

Accomplishments and honors

Awards
- A-10 Coach of the Year (2021); United East Coach of the Year (2022)

David Cochran Miller (born December 9, 1973) is an American college baseball coach and former first baseman who will be in his second tenure as head baseball coach of the La Salle Explorers starting in 2026. He previously served as the head coach for La Salle from 2018 until 2021 and the Penn State Abington Nittany Lions (2022). He then served as head coach at Manhattan from 2023–2024.

== Amateur career ==
Miller attended Chestnut Hill Academy in Philadelphia, Pennsylvania. Miller played for the school's varsity baseball team all four years and played basketball as well. Miller then enrolled at Clemson University, to play college baseball for the Clemson Tigers baseball team.

As a freshman at Clemson University in 1993, Miller had a .271 batting average, a .303 on-base percentage (OBP) and a .329 SLG. After the 1993 season, he played collegiate summer baseball with the Harwich Mariners of the Cape Cod Baseball League.

As a sophomore in 1994, Miller batted .313 with a .396 SLG, 1 home run, and 59 RBIs.

In the 1995 season as a junior, Miller hit 9 home runs, 14 doubles, 10 triples and 78 RBIs. He was named First Team All-Atlantic Coast Conference, Second Team Coaches All-American, Third Team All-American by Baseball America and Third Team All-American by Collegiate Baseball Newspaper.

== Professional career ==
Miller was considered to be one of the best available players in the 1995 Major League Baseball draft and was drafted 23rd overall by the Cleveland Indians.

Miller began his professional career with the Kinston Indians of the Class A-Advanced Carolina League, where he batted .254 with seven home runs. He was promoted to the Akron Aeros of the Double-A Eastern League in 1997. He hit .301 with four home runs for Akron. Miller started 1998 with the Buffalo Bisons of the Class AAA International League. He completed the season batting .267 with 9 home runs and 54 RBIs in 115 games. With Miller not being added to the Indians' 40 man roster, Miller was selected by the Philadelphia Phillies in the 1998 Rule 5 draft. Miller failed to make the Phillies 40 man and was returned to the Indians. He played a second season at Buffalo in 1999, hitting .240 with 2 home runs and 37 RBIs. In 2000, Miller played for the Bisons again, was demoted to the Aeros and then released by the Indians. He was signed by the Atlanta Braves and played the remainder of the season with the Greenville Braves. Miller then missed the 2001 season with an injury. He returned to action in 2002 with the Chattanooga Lookouts of the Cincinnati Reds organization. He was released following the 2002 season. He signed with the Camden Riversharks of the Atlantic League of Professional Baseball. Miller retired after the season.

== Coaching career ==
Miller assisted coaching at the University of Hawaii at Hilo in 2003. Miller was assistant coach at Rutgers University–Camden in 2009. From 2010 to 2011, Miller assisted on the Villanova Wildcats baseball team. On July 8, 2011, Miller joined the William & Mary Tribe baseball program as an assistant coach. On July 15, 2013, Miller was announced as the head coach of William Penn Charter School.

On June 29, 2017, Miller was the head coach of the La Salle Explorers baseball program. Miller lead the Explorers to a 14–41 record in his first season. Following a shortened 2020 NCAA Division I baseball season due to the COVID-19 pandemic, La Salle announced that baseball would be one of the seven sports to be dropped at the end of the 2020–21 academic year for sustainability reasons. When the Explorers took the field for their final season in 2021, they set a school record with 32 wins and tied a school record with 15 Atlantic 10 Conference victories. As a result, Miller was named the Atlantic 10 Coach of the Year.

In January 2022, Miller was named the head baseball coach at Penn State Abington. Miller lead the Nittany Lions to a second-place finish in the United East Conference. For his efforts, he was named the United East Coach of the Year.

On September 8, 2022, Miller was named the head coach of the Manhattan Jaspers.

== Head coaching record ==
Record table
| Season | Team | Overall | Conference | Standing | Postseason |
|---|---|---|---|---|---|
La Salle Explorers (Atlantic 10 Conference) (2018–2021)
| 2018 | La Salle | 14–41 | 4–20 | 13th | |
| 2019 | La Salle | 25–31 | 4–20 | 13th | |
| 2020 | La Salle | 5–9 | 0–0 | | Season canceled due to COVID-19 |
| 2021 | La Salle | 32–21 | 15–9 | T-2nd (North) | |
Penn State Abington (United East Conference) (2022)
| 2022 | Penn State Abington | 33–11 | 17–4 | 2nd | United East Tournament |
| Penn State Abington: | | 33–11 | 17–4 | | |
Manhattan Jaspers (Metro Atlantic Athletic Conference) (2023–2024)
| 2023 | Manhattan | 22–34 | 13–11 | 6th | MAAC Tournament |
| 2024 | Manhattan | 22–30 | 10–14 | T-6th | |
| Manhattan: | | 44–64 (.407) | 23–25 (.479) | | |
La Salle Explorers (Atlantic 10 Conference) (2026–present)
| 2026 | La Salle | 24–31 | 8–22 | 11th | |
| La Salle: | | 100–133 | 31–71 | | |
| Total: | | 177–208 (.460) | | | |
National champion Postseason invitational champion Conference regular season champion Conference regular season and conference tournament champion Division regular season champion Division regular season and conference tournament champion Conference tournament champion
