= Scott Doffek =

American baseball coach

Biographical details
- Born: July 31, 1968 (age 58); Hartland, Wisconsin, U.S.
- Education: Waukesha County Technical College

Playing career
- 1988–1989: Waukesha County CC
- Position: Second base / Third base

Coaching career (HC unless noted)
- 1995–2006: Milwaukee (assistant)
- 2007–2023: Milwaukee

Head coaching record
- Overall: 427–449–1

Accomplishments and honors

Awards
- 2× Horizon League Coach of the Year (2009, 2013)

Scott Robert Doffek (born July 31, 1968) is an American baseball coach and former infielder, who is the former head baseball coach of the Milwaukee Panthers. He attended college at Waukesha County Technical College, where he played on the school baseball team before embarking on a five-year minor league baseball career in the Los Angeles Dodgers organization. He previously served as an assistant baseball coach at the University of Wisconsin–Milwaukee from 1995 to 2006.

== Head coaching record ==
Record table
Season	Team	Overall	Conference	Standing	Postseason
Milwaukee Panthers (Horizon League) (2007–2023)
2007	Milwaukee	23–32	16–14	3rd	
2008	Milwaukee	25–36	11–15	5th	
2009	Milwaukee	28–27	14–9	2nd	
2010	Milwaukee	33–26	17–8	2nd	NCAA Regional
2011	Milwaukee	28–28–1	15–10–1	3rd	
2012	Milwaukee	27–27	18–11	3rd	
2013	Milwaukee	29–21	14–7	1st	
2014	Milwaukee	21–29	10–14	4th	
2015	Milwaukee	39–20	16–13	3rd	
2016	Milwaukee	32–26	17–11	2nd	
2017	Milwaukee	22–32	10–18	6th	
2018	Milwaukee	26–28	13–12	3rd	
2019	Milwaukee	36–22–1	18–11	T-2nd	
2020	Milwaukee	1–14	0–0		Season canceled due to COVID-19
2021	Milwaukee	22–33	17–23	4th	Horizon tournament
2022	Milwaukee	20–30	9–17	7th	
2023	Milwaukee	25–32	11–18	5th	Horizon tournament
Milwaukee:		427–449–1	226–211–1		
Total:		427–449–1			
National champion Postseason invitational champion Conference regular season champion Conference regular season and conference tournament champion Division regular season champion Division regular season and conference tournament champion Conference tournament champion
