= 2013 Ivy League Baseball Championship Series =

2013 Ivy League baseball tournament
- Teams: 2
- Format: Best of three series
- Finals site: Robertson Field at Satow Stadium; New York, New York
- Champions: Columbia (2nd title)
- Winning coach: Brett Boretti (2nd title)
- Attendance: 952

2013 Ivy League baseball standings
	Conf.				Overall
Team	W		L	PCT	W		L	PCT
Lou Gehrig
Columbia ^{x}‍‍‡‍^{y}	16	–	4	.800	28	–	20	.583
Cornell ‍‍‍	11	–	9	.550	23	–	17	.575
Princeton ‍‍‍	11	–	9	.550	14	–	28	.333
Penn ‍‍‍	7	–	13	.350	22	–	21	.512
Red Rolfe
Dartmouth ^{x}‍‍‍	15	–	5	.750	32	–	9	.780
Yale ‍‍‍	10	–	10	.500	13	–	25	.342
Harvard ‍‍‍	7	–	13	.350	10	–	31	.244
Brown ‍‍‍	3	–	17	.150	7	–	33	.175
x – Division champion ‡ – Championship Series champion y – Invited to the NCAA tournament As of June 30, 2013; Rankings from Collegiate Baseball

The 2013 Ivy League Baseball Championship Series was held at Robertson Field at Satow Stadium on the campus of Columbia University in New York, New York, on May 4, 2013. The series matched the regular season champions of each of the league's two divisions, Columbia and Dartmouth. Columbia won their second series championship in two games and claimed the Ivy League's automatic berth in the 2013 NCAA Division I baseball tournament.

Through the 2013 championship, Dartmouth had appeared in the Ivy League Championship Series every year since 2008, winning in 2009 and 2010.

== Results ==
Game One

May 4, 2013 12:00 pm
Team	1	2	3	4	5	6	7	8	9	10	R	H	E
Dartmouth	2	0	0	0	0	1	0	1	1	0	5	10	3
Columbia	0	3	0	0	1	0	1	0	0	1	6	13	1
WP: Roy (3–1) LP: Sulser (5–3); Home runs: Dartmouth: Keller; Columbia: None; Boxscore

Game Two

May 4, 2013 3:40 pm
Team	1	2	3	4	5	6	7	8	9	R	H	E
Columbia	0	2	1	1	0	0	6	0	2	12	16	0
Dartmouth	2	0	0	0	1	2	0	0	0	5	9	3
WP: Olson (1–1) LP: Danielak (1–1); Attendance: 952; Boxscore
