= Barcroft Park =

Public baseball venue in Arlington, Virginia, United States

Tucker Field at Barcroft Park
- The Tuck, Home of the Revolutionaries
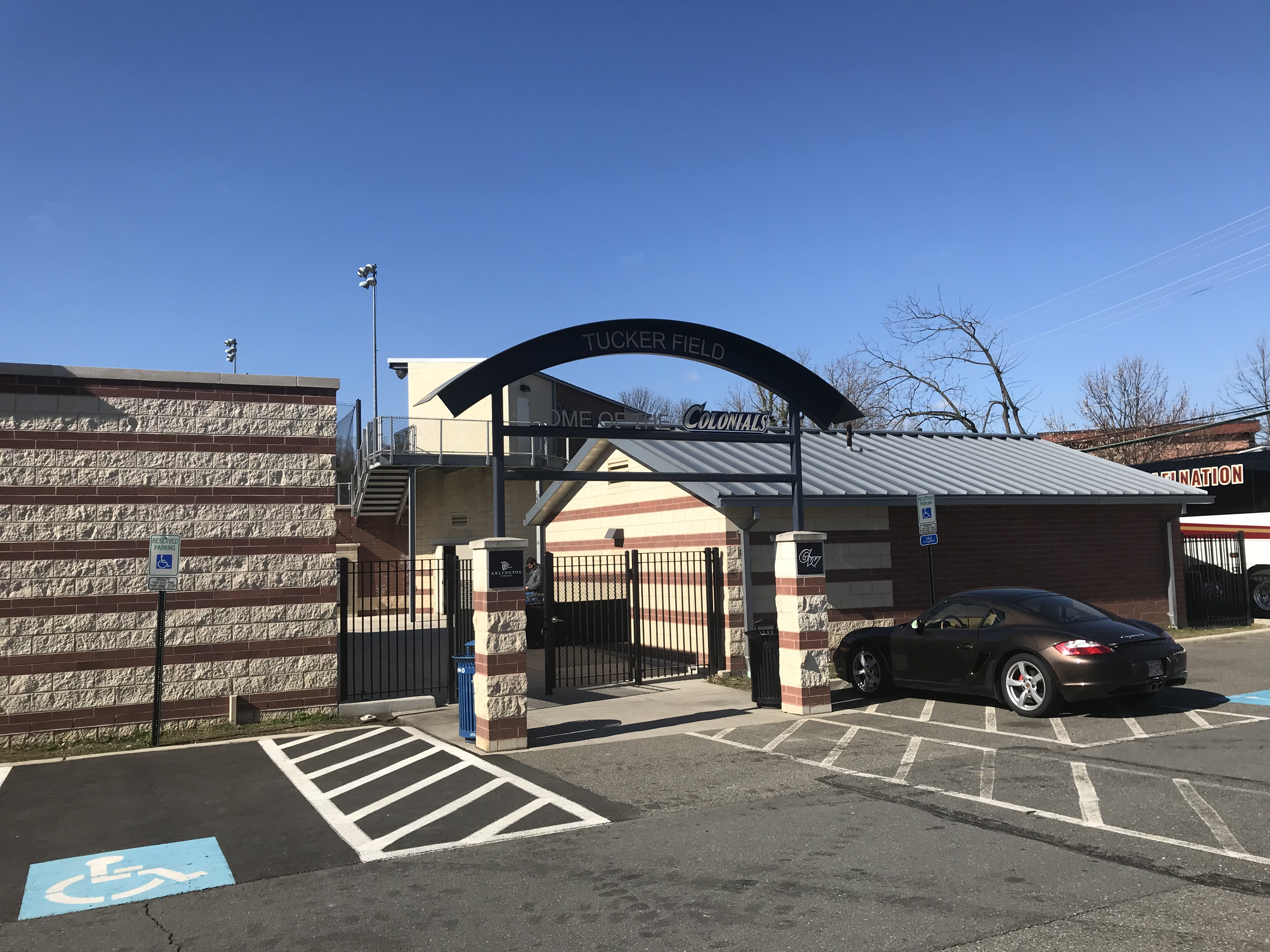
- Interactive map of Tucker Field at Barcroft Park
- Full name: Tucker Field at Barcroft Park Field No. 6
- Location: 4200 South Four Mile Run Drive, Arlington County, Virginia, U.S.
- Coordinates: 38.851274°N 77.103585°W
- Owner: Arlington County
- Capacity: 500
- Executive suites: 1
- Surface: FieldTurf
- Scoreboard: Daktronics
- Field size: Left Field: 330 feet (100 m); Left Center Field: 347 feet (106 m); Center Field: 370 feet (110 m); Right Center Field: 347 feet (106 m); Right Field: 330 feet (100 m)

Construction
- Renovated: 2011, 2018, 2019

Tenant
- George Washington Colonials baseball (NCAA Division I A-10) (1993–present)

Tucker Field at Barcroft Park is a baseball venue located in Arlington County, Virginia. The field is home to the George Washington Revolutionaries baseball team of the NCAA Division I Atlantic 10 Conference. The field holds a capacity of 500 spectators. The field is officially designated Tucker Field at Barcroft Park Field #6 and includes a new turf field laid in 2019 by FieldTurf, bullpens, enclosed dugouts, bleachers, lights, scoreboard, and pressbox.

== Renovations ==
In the offseason between 2011 and 2012, Barcroft Park underwent renovations. Using funds from both George Washington University and the Arlington County Parks, Recreation, and Cultural Resources Department, the field will receive a new artificial turf surface, a press box, stadium seating, concessions, dugouts, and bullpens. In December 2011, the demolition of the previous structures was completed. At the beginning of the 2012 season, the renovations had not been completed, and George Washington was forced to relocate some home games. George Washington played its first game at the renovated park on March 23, 2012, in which the Colonials lost to La Salle 7–4.

== Colonials home records ==
The following is a list of Colonials home records since the team began playing at Barcroft in the 1993 season.

Year	Wins	Losses	Ties	Win Pct.
1993	6	7		.462
1994	12	8		.667
1995	13	7		.650
1996	16	11		.593
1997	12	10		.545
1998	21	5		.808
1999	14	9		.609
2000	21	7		.750
2001	21	7		.750
2002	21	9		.700
2003	19	3		.864
2004	22	5		.815
2005	23	9		.719
2006	9	13		.409
2007	12	11	1	.522
2008	12	15		.444
2009	16	17		.485
2010	10	11		.476
2011	11	17		.393
2012	11	17		.393
2013	15	16		.484
2014	14	16		.467
2015	20	10		.667
2016	15	11		.577
2017	15	10		.600
2018	22	10		.688
2019	22	11		.667
Total	425	282	1	.600

== See also ==
- List of NCAA Division I baseball venues
