= Hank DeVincent Field =

Baseball venue in Philadelphia, Pennsylvania

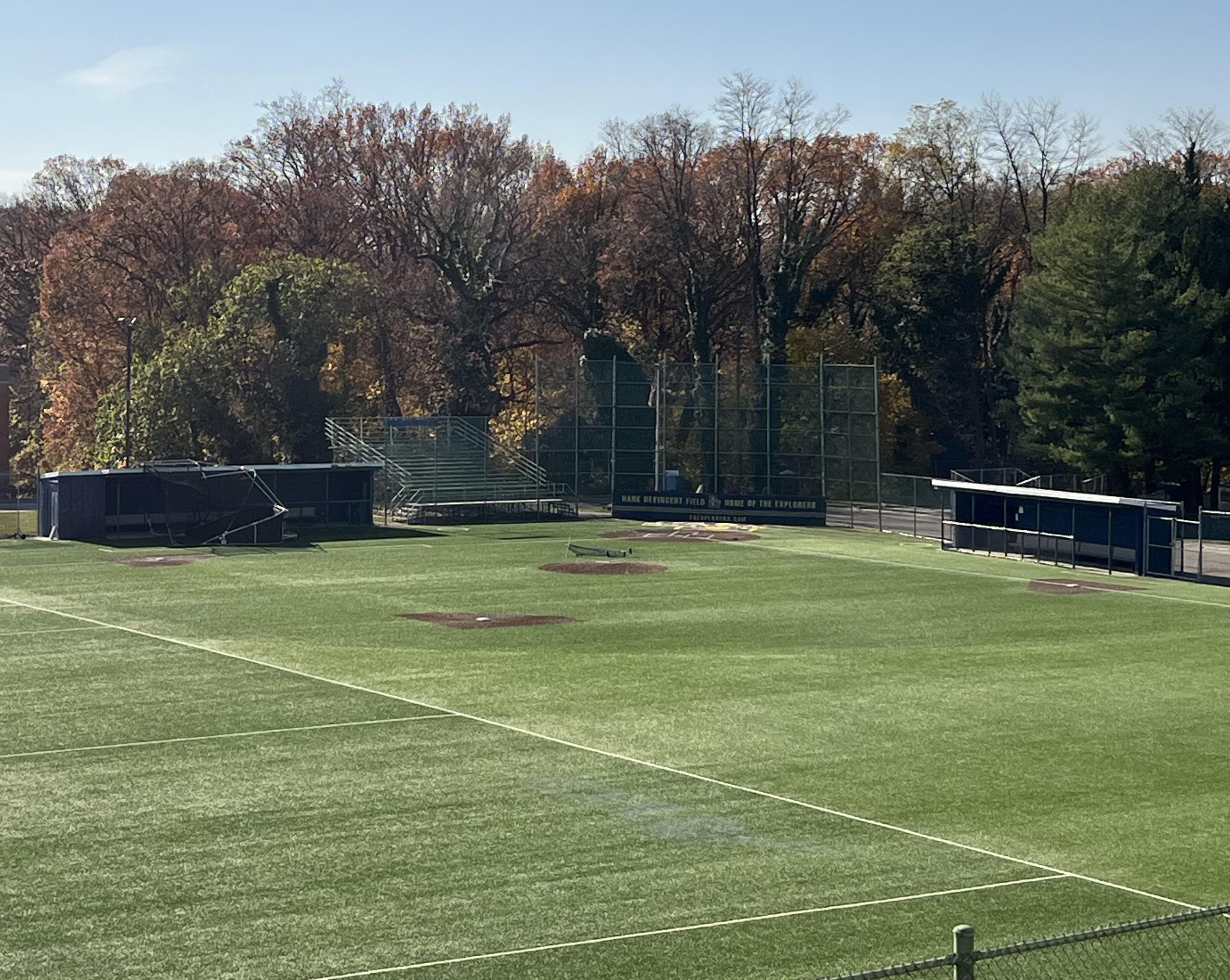
- Interactive map of Hank DeVincent Field
- Location: La Salle University campus; 1900 W. Olney Avenue, Philadelphia, Pennsylvania, USA
- Coordinates: 40.036382°N 75.153372°W
- Owner: La Salle University
- Operator: La Salle University
- Capacity: 1,000
- Surface: Sprinturf
- Scoreboard: Electronic

Construction
- Renovated: 2007, 2012, 2019

Tenant
- La Salle Explorers baseball (NCAA D1 A-10)

Hank DeVincent Field is a baseball venue located on the campus of La Salle University in Philadelphia, Pennsylvania, United States. The field is home to the La Salle Explorers baseball team of the NCAA Division I Atlantic 10 Conference. The field holds a capacity of 1,000 spectators. On April 29, 1978 the field was named after former player and La Salle captain Hank DeVincent.

== Renovations ==
=== Left field wall ===
In fall 2007, the school heightened the field's left field wall to prevent home run balls from breaking the windows of buildings over the fence. The chain link was painted green in homage to the Green Monster at Fenway Park in Boston, Massachusetts, home of Major League Baseball's Boston Red Sox. The Green Monster, which is also green, is the left field fence at Fenway. A new batting cage was constructed at the same time as the wall, and both improvements were part of a campus-wide construction project.

=== Dugouts ===
In fall 2012, the field's dugouts were lengthened and upgraded.
