= Robert and Mariam Hayes Stadium =

Baseball venue in Charlotte, North Carolina

Coordinates: 35.308097°N 80.73898°W

- The Hayes
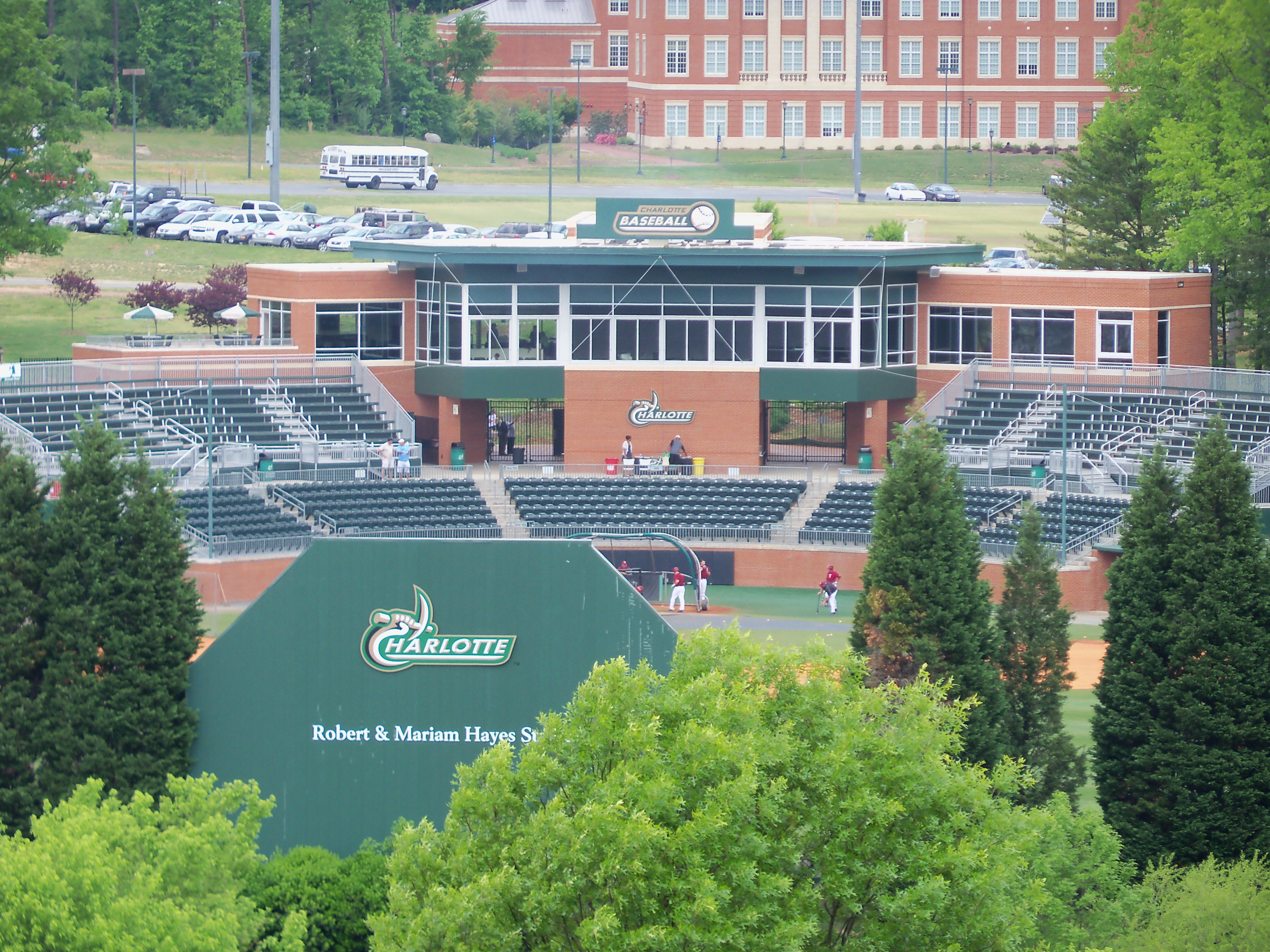
- Interactive map of Robert and Mariam Hayes Stadium
- Former names: Tom and Lib Phillips Field (1988–2006)
- Location: University of North Carolina at Charlotte
- Owner: UNC Charlotte
- Capacity: 1,100 (seated); 3,000 (standing room)
- Surface: Turf Infield, Natural Grass Outfield
- Field size: Left field: 335 ft Left Center Field: 370 ft Center Field: 390 ft Right Center Field: 370 ft Right field: 335 ft

Construction
- Opened: February 25, 1984 (initial); March 30, 2007 (reopened)
- Cost: $5.9 million ($9.42 million in 2025 dollars)
- Architect: Overcash Demmitt Architects
- General contractor: RT Dooley Construction Company

Tenant
- Charlotte 49ers baseball (NCAA D1 AAC) (1984–2002; 2004–present)

Robert and Mariam Hayes Stadium at Tom and Lib Phillips Field is a baseball venue on the campus of the University of North Carolina at Charlotte in Charlotte, North Carolina, United States. The playing surface has been the home of the Charlotte 49ers baseball team since 1984, and the new stadium surrounding the field was opened in 2007.

== History ==
The Charlotte baseball team played its first season in 1979 at Crockett Park, the home of the Double-A Charlotte O's. In 1984, a field was built on Charlotte's campus. After businessman Tom Phillips paid to have lights added to the field in 1988, the facility was rechristened Tom and Lib Phillips Field.

The playing surface was redone during the 2003 season; in the meantime, the 49ers played at Fieldcrest Cannon Stadium, 15 miles (24 km) away in Kannapolis.

In 2010, the 49ers averaged nearly 1,000 fans per game as 33,966 attended games at Robert and Mariam Hayes Stadium. Through the first 8 home games in 2011, 8,166 attended games for a 1,020 average.

As of March 3, 2011, the 49ers have a 96–25 record at the stadium.

=== Renovation ===
In the summer of 2006 it was announced that Phillips Field would undergo a $5.9 million overhaul with the goal of making UNC Charlotte's baseball facilities top-notch. The project was funded by the late Mariam Cannon Hayes, a local philanthropist who had contributed money to numerous educational programs and facilities throughout North Carolina such as the Barnhardt Student Activity Center at UNC Charlotte and the school of music at Appalachian State University.

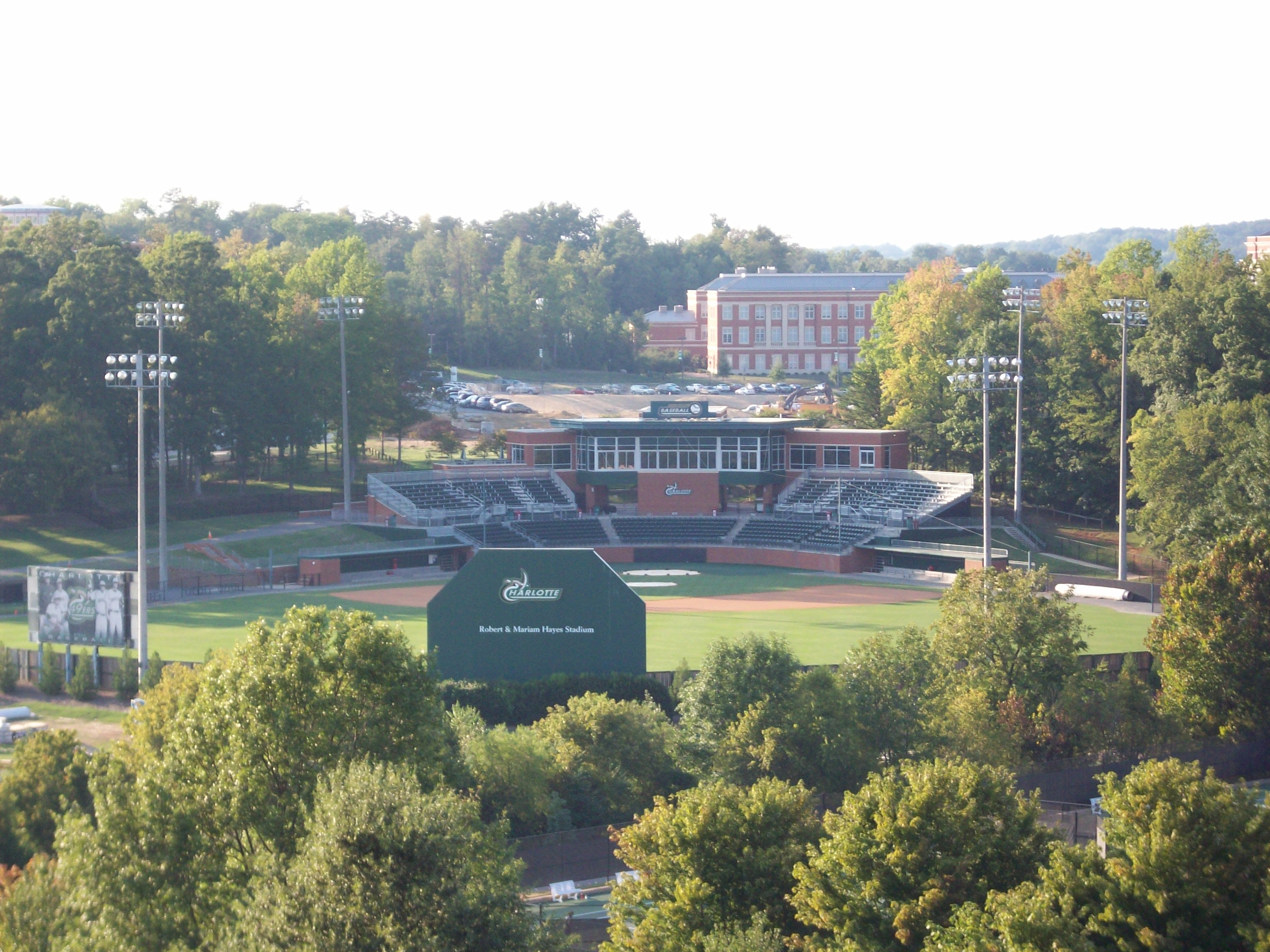
Hayes Stadium in 2012, following replacement of the outer wall trees.

The renovation affected all aspects of the baseball facility at UNC Charlotte with the exception of the playing surface. Concession stands and restrooms, previously available only across the street from the field, are available inside the stadium. Whereas Phillips Field had one set of metal bleachers and a small metal pressbox, Hayes Stadium features a lower level of chairback seats and an upper level of bleachers. The pressbox consists of radio and television booths and offices for the baseball staff. On May 11, 2007, the hospitality suite that is part of the new facility was named in honor of Erik Walker, a former pitcher with the 49ers and the Tampa Bay Devil Rays organization who was killed in a canoeing accident in October 2006.

During the initial stages of the renovation, Charlotte's baseball team practiced at local high school facilities. The first half of the 49ers' 2007 season was played mostly at Fieldcrest Cannon Stadium, but the team also played home series on the campuses of Winthrop University and Pfeiffer University.

=== Return to Campus ===
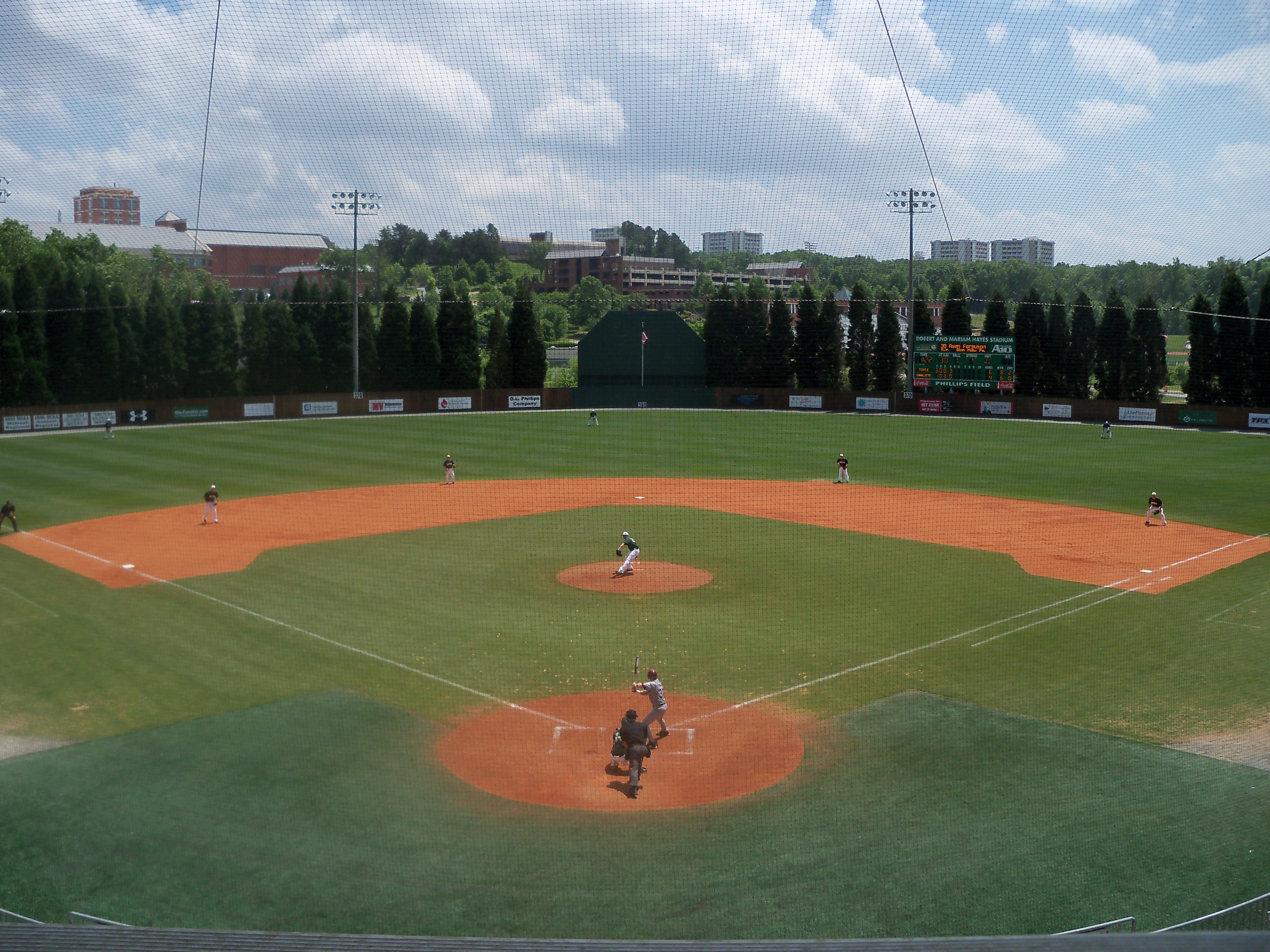
The playing surface at Hayes Stadium in 2010.

The 49ers opened Robert and Mariam Hayes Stadium on March 30, 2007 with a 3-1 victory over UMass. En route to the 2007 Atlantic 10 conference title, the 49ers went 25–4 in all home games, including a 13–3 record at Hayes Stadium.

Despite being finished enough to host games during the latter portions of the 2007 season, the stadium was not complete until the summer of 2007. The chairback seats were in place by late April, but the bleachers, pressbox, restrooms, and concession stands were not finished in time for the end of the season.

In October 2007 a new scoreboard was erected in right-center field, complete with a scrolling message board. Plans are in the making to add a video replay board in the future. An indoor practice hitting facility will be added adjacent to the third-base side of the stadium sometime in the near future.

== Features ==
=== Statue ===
The facility features one of the campus's 14 Richard Hallier athletic statues. The statue of a batter graces the front entrance to the stadium. There are 11 more Hallier sports statues on the UNC Charlotte campus, all of which were donated by Charlotte businessman and philanthropist Irwin Belk.

=== Cemetery ===
Two cemetery plots bracket the front entrance to the stadium. The plots belonged to the former Mecklenburg County Indigents' Home; A hospital that cared for the poor, which was located near the current location of Carolinas Medical Center-University. The burials occurred in the 1930s and 1940s, before the University moved to the location in 1961. The graves are marked with plain rock markers and no record of the names of those buried there remain. The plots are closed off by wooden split-rail fencing.

== See also ==
- List of NCAA Division I baseball venues
