= Charlotte 49ers baseball =

- 2026 Charlotte 49ers baseball team
- Founded: 1979
- University: University of North Carolina at Charlotte
- Head coach: Robert Woodard (7th season)
- Conference: The American
- Location: Charlotte, North Carolina
- Home stadium: Robert and Mariam Hayes Stadium (capacity: 1,100)
- Nickname: 49ers
- Colors: Green and white

NCAA tournament appearances
- 1993, 1998, 2007, 2008, 2011, 2021, 2023

Conference tournament champions
- Metro: 1993; A-10: 2007, 2008, 2011; C-USA: 2023

Conference regular season champions
- Metro: 1994, 1995; A-10: 2007, 2008, 2010, 2011, 2013

Conference division regular season champions
- C-USA East: 2021

The Charlotte 49ers baseball team, commonly referred to as Charlotte, represents the University of North Carolina at Charlotte in NCAA Division I college baseball. Established in 1979, the team is a member of the American Athletic Conference. The team plays its home games at Robert & Mariam Hayes Stadium in Charlotte, North Carolina, and are currently coached by Robert Woodard.

In the 2025 season, the 49ers finished with an overall record of 36–22 and an 18–9 record in American Athletic Conference play.

== Venues ==
The 49ers play most home games at Robert & Mariam Hayes Stadium since its completion in 2007. However, the surface where the stadium sits today has been the playing surface dating back to 1984.

== Charlotte in the NCAA tournament ==
Year	Record	Pct	Notes
1993	0–2	.000	Mideast Regional
1998	0–2	.000	Central Regional
2007	2–2	.500	Columbia Regional
2008	0–2	.000	Raleigh Regional
2011	1–2	.333	Tempe Regional
2021	1–2	.333	Greenville Regional
2023	2–2	.500	Clemson Regional
TOTALS	6–14	.300	

In the 2025 American Athletic Conference tournament, Charlotte reached the second round after defeating Wichita State 7–1 before being eliminated following losses to East Carolina and South Florida.

== Coaches ==
Coach	Tenure	Record	Notes
Gary Bartley	1979-1981	55-82	First Coach in program history.
Gary Robinson	1982-1991	280-244-3	Coach of the Year (1985 Sun Belt)
Jeff Edmonds	1992	29-30	
Loren Hibbs	1993-2019	819-682-5	Coach of the Year (1994 Metro, 1998 C-USA, 2007 A-10)
Robert Woodard	2020–present	199–145	Coach of the Year (2021 C-USA)

== Major League Baseball ==
Charlotte has had 63 Major League Baseball draft selections since the draft began in 1965. There were two players selected in 2024.

49ers in the Major League Baseball Draft
Year	Player	Round	Team
1982	Carlos Concepcion	24	Orioles
1983	Jim Dickerson	19	Cubs
1985	Eugene Ayers	28	Dodgers
1985	Barry Shifflett	22	Expos
1986	Barry Shifflett	21	Blue Jays
1986	Kenneth Morgan	17	Twins
1986	Danny Montgomery	14	Dodgers
1987	Jeff Shore	41	Pirates
1987	Stu Cole	3	Royals
1988	Eric Williams	41	Cubs
1988	Jeff Shore	27	Rangers
1988	Jeff Johnson	6	Yankees
1989	Scott Muscat	18	Brewers
1990	Joe Ganote	41	Blue Jays
1990	Frank Kower	38	Blue Jays
1990	Chris Haney	2	Expos
1991	Kris Gresham	33	Orioles
1991	Allen Plaster	20	Orioles
1991	Deon Danner	9	Pirates
1992	Andy Heckman	32	Giants
1992	Donovan Mitchell	14	Astros
1992	Sean Whiteside	11	Tigers
1993	Cameron Browder	46	Braves
1994	Mark McWilliams	54	Cardinals
1995	Andy Bovender	25	Astros
1995	Tim Collie	24	Pirates
1995	Matt McWilliams	15	Braves
2000	Daryl Clark	17	Brewers
2000	Brion Treadway	3	Giants
2002	John Maine	6	Orioles
2004	Kevin Brower	33	Tigers
2006	Erik Walker	20	Devil Rays
2007	Spencer Steedley	25	Twins
2007	Kris Rochelle	22	Tigers
2007	Adam Mills	8	Red Sox
2008	Christopher Taylor	45	Cardinals
2008	Brad McElroy	25	Blue Jays
2008	Shayne Moody	24	Braves
2008	Zach Rosenbaum	19	Mets
2009	Aaron Bray	27	Astros
2009	Robert Lyerly	6	Yankees
2010	Ryan Rivers	35	Angels
2012	Miguel Rodriguez	36	Red Sox
2013	Tyler Barnette	14	White Sox
2013	Justin Seager	12	Mariners
2014	Brock Hudgens	31	Brewers
2014	Ryan Butler	7	Padres
2017	Brett Netzer	3	Red Sox
2017	Colton Laws	7	Blue Jays
2017	T. J. Nichting	9	Orioles
2017	Zach Jarrett	28	Orioles
2018	Josh Maciejewski	10	Yankees
2018	Reece Hampton	12	Tigers
2019	Harris Yett	32	Orioles
2021	Bryce McGowan	18	Rockies
2021	Aaron McKeithan	16	Cardinals
2022	Spencer Giesting	11	Diamondbacks
2022	David McCabe	4	Braves
2022	Nate Furman	4	Guardians
2023	Donye Evans	16	Tigers
2023	Jake Cunningham	5	Orioles
2023	Cam Fisher	4	Astros
2023	Wyatt Hudepohl	4	Mets
2024	Ryan Degges	17	Phillies
2024	A. J. Wilson	12	Phillies
2025	Blake Gillespie	9	Yankees
2025	Logan Poteet	17	Cubs
2025	Joel Sarver	17	Diamondbacks

== See also ==
- List of NCAA Division I baseball programs
