= La Salle Explorers baseball =

American college baseball team

La Salle Explorers
- 2026 La Salle Explorers baseball team
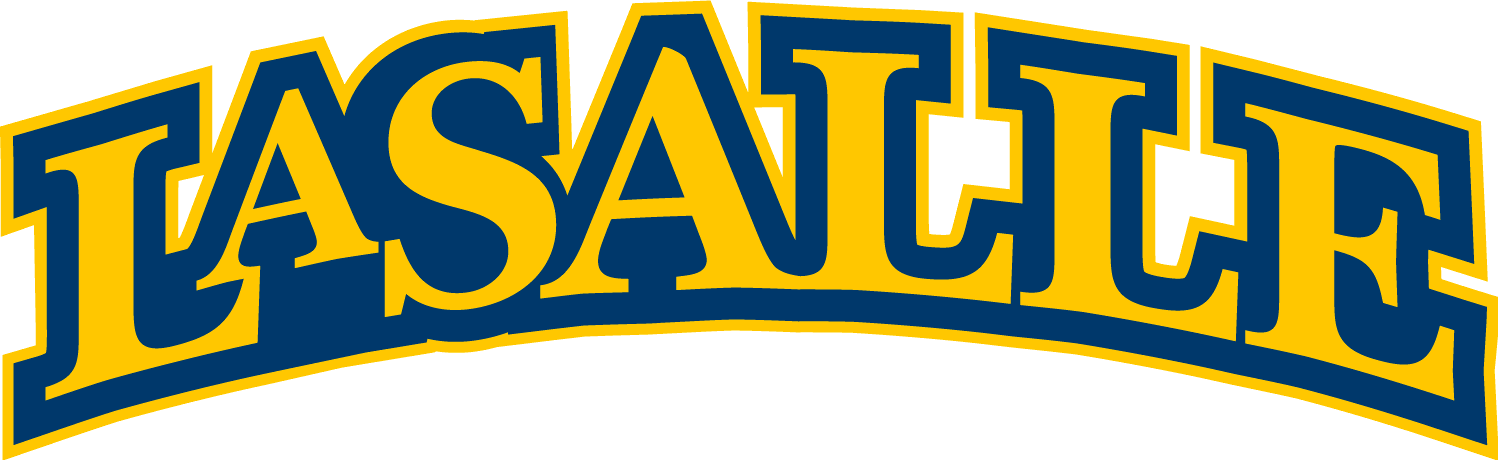
- Founded: 1947-2021, 2026–present
- University: La Salle University
- Athletic director: Phil Snead (interim)
- Head coach: David Miller (5th season)
- Conference: Atlantic 10
- Location: Philadelphia, Pennsylvania
- Home stadium: Hank DeVincent Field (capacity: 1,000)
- Nickname: Explorers
- Colors: Blue and gold

NCAA tournament appearances
- 1964, 1985

Conference regular season champions
- 1989

The La Salle Explorers baseball team is a varsity intercollegiate athletic team of La Salle University in Philadelphia, Pennsylvania, United States. The team is a member of the Atlantic 10 Conference, which is part of the National Collegiate Athletic Association's Division I. The team plays its home games at Hank DeVincent Field in Philadelphia.

La Salle announced in September 2020 that baseball would be one of the seven sports to be dropped at the end of the 2020–21 academic year for sustainability reasons. However, in April 2024, La Salle announced that baseball would be reinstated as a sponsored sport beginning in the 2025–26 academic year (2026 season), along with starting new programs for women's rugby, women's acrobatics and tumbling, and women's triathlon. On June 3, 2024, La Salle announced the re-hiring of head coach David Miller, who was the head coach when the program was initially dropped in 2021. Miller began his tenure in June 2024 to prepare for the return of the baseball program to competition in 2025–26. The team returned to play on February 13, 2026, with a 27–10 home win over Maryland-Eastern Shore.

== La Salle in the NCAA Tournament ==
Year	Record	Pct	Notes
1964	0–1	.000	District 2
1985	2–2	.500	East Regional
TOTALS	2–3	.400	

== Retired Numbers ==
La Salle Explorers retired numbers
No.	Player	Position	Career
7	Bill Bradshaw	2B	1966-1969
8	Hank DeVincent	OF	1954-1956
9	Gene McDonnell	Coach	1959-1988, 1991-1995

== See also ==
- List of NCAA Division I baseball programs
