= 1993 College Baseball All-America Team =

Honorary sports team

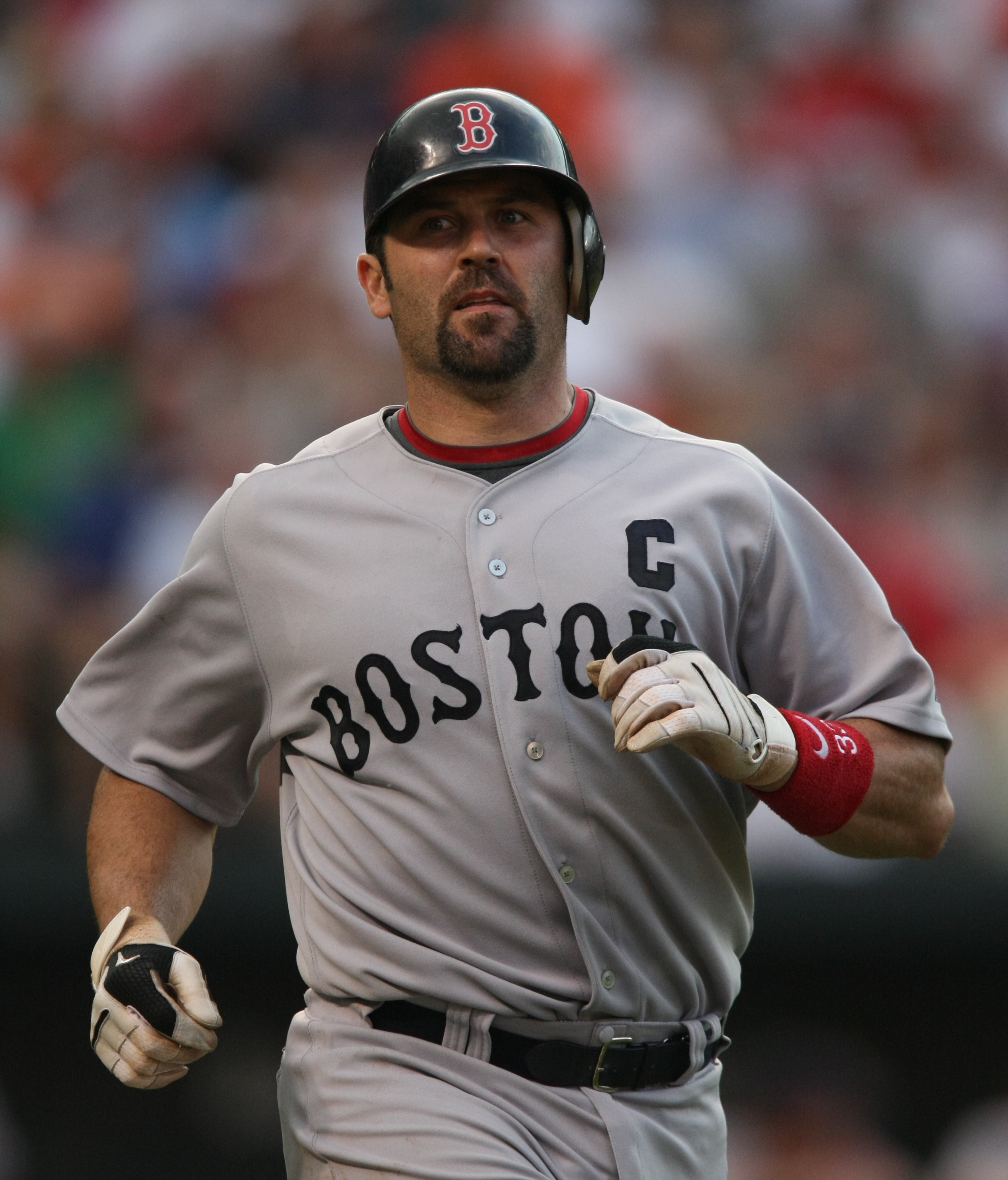
Jason Varitek has caught a Major League Baseball record 4 no-hitters.

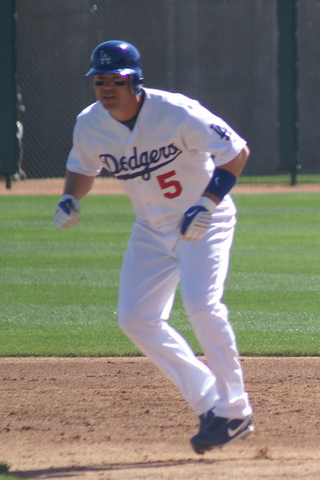
Mark Loretta was a 2× Major League Baseball All-Star.

This is a list of college baseball players named first team All-Americans for the 1993 NCAA Division I baseball season. In 1993, there were five generally recognized All-America selectors for baseball: the American Baseball Coaches Association, Baseball America, the Collegiate Baseball Newspaper, the National Collegiate Baseball Writers Association, and The Sporting News. In order to be considered a "consensus" All-American, a player must have been selected by at least three of these.

== Key ==
A	American Baseball Coaches Association
B	Baseball America
C	Collegiate Baseball Newspaper
N	National Collegiate Baseball Writers Association
S	The Sporting News
	Member of the National College Baseball Hall of Fame
	Consensus All-American – selected by all five organizations
	Consensus All-American – selected by three or four organizations

== All-Americans ==
Position	Name	School	#	A	B	C	N	S	Other awards and honors
Starting pitcher	Brian Anderson	Wright State	3	✓	✓	✓	—	—	
Starting pitcher	Alan Benes	Creighton	1	—	—	—	✓	—	
Starting pitcher	Troy Brohawn	Nebraska	1	—	—	✓	—	—	
Starting pitcher	Dan Choi	Long Beach State	4	✓	✓	✓	✓	—	
Starting pitcher	Scott Christman	Oregon State	2	✓	—	✓	—	—	
Starting pitcher	Jeff Granger	Texas A&M	4	✓	✓	—	✓	✓	
Starting pitcher	Brett Laxton	LSU	1	—	—	—	✓	—	
Starting pitcher	Trey Moore	Texas A&M	1	—	—	—	✓	—	
Starting pitcher	John Powell	Auburn	1	—	✓	—	—	—	
Relief pitcher	Thad Chrismon	North Carolina	1	—	—	✓	—	—	
Relief pitcher	Darren Dreifort	Wichita State	4	✓	✓	—	✓	✓	Golden Spikes Award Rotary Smith Award
Relief pitcher	Dan Hubbs	USC	1	—	—	—	—	✓	
Relief pitcher	Paul Thornton	Georgia Southern	1	—	—	✓	—	—	
Catcher	Casey Burrill	USC	1	—	—	—	✓	—	
Catcher	Jason Varitek	Georgia Tech	5	✓	✓	✓	✓	✓	
First baseman	Braxton Hickman	Texas	1	—	—	—	✓	—	
First baseman	Ryan McGuire	UCLA	5	✓	✓	✓	✓	✓	
Second baseman	Jeff Berblinger	Kansas	1	—	—	—	✓	—	
Second baseman	Mark Merila	Minnesota	1	—	—	—	✓	—	
Second baseman	Todd Walker	LSU	5	✓	✓	✓	✓	✓	College World Series Most Outstanding Player
Shortstop	Joe Biernat	South Carolina	1	—	—	—	✓	—	
Shortstop	Nomar Garciaparra	Georgia Tech	2	—	—	—	✓	✓	
Shortstop	Mark Loretta	Northwestern	3	✓	✓	✓	—	—	
Third baseman	George Arias	Arizona	3	—	—	✓	✓	✓	
Third baseman	Antonio Fernandez	New Mexico	1	✓	—	—	—	—	
Third baseman	Ernesto Rivera	Oklahoma State	1	—	—	—	✓	—	
Third baseman	Antone Williamson	Arizona State	2	—	✓	—	✓	—	
Outfielder	Pat Clougherty	NC State	1	—	—	—	✓	—	
Outfielder	Eric Danapilis	Notre Dame	5	✓	✓	✓	✓	✓	
Outfielder	Todd Greene	Georgia Southern	2	✓	—	—	✓	—	
Outfielder	Vee Hightower	Vanderbilt	2	—	—	✓	—	✓	
Outfielder	Billy McMillon	Clemson	1	—	—	—	✓	—	
Outfielder	Robbie Moen	Arizona	2	—	—	—	✓	✓	
Outfielder	Dante Powell	Cal State Fullerton	2	—	—	—	✓	✓	
Outfielder	Marc Sagmoen	Nebraska	3	✓	—	✓	✓	—	
Outfielder	Brian Thomas	Texas A&M	2	✓	—	—	✓	—	
Outfielder	Pat Watkins	East Carolina	1	—	✓	—	—	—	
Designated hitter	Paul LoDuca	Arizona State	4	✓	✓	✓	✓	—	The Sporting News Player of the Year
Utility player	Kenny Harrison	Hawaii	1	—	—	—	✓	—	
Utility player / OF / SP	Brooks Kieschnick	Texas	4	✓	✓	✓	✓	—	Dick Howser Trophy ABCA Player of the Year Baseball America Player of the Year Collegiate Baseball Player of the Year
Utility player	Doug Newstrom	Arizona State	1	—	—	—	✓	—	

== See also ==
- List of college baseball awards
