= 1993 Southeastern Conference baseball tournament =

- Teams: 6
- Format: Six-team double elimination tournament
- Finals site: Sarge Frye Field; Columbia, South Carolina
- Champions: Tennessee (1st title)
- Winning coach: Rod Delmonico (1st title)
- MVP: Todd Helton (Tennessee)
- Attendance: 8,050

1993 Southeastern Conference baseball tournament
- Teams: 6
- Format: Six-team double elimination tournament
- Finals site: Alex Box Stadium (1938); Baton Rouge, Louisiana
- Champions: LSU (4th title)
- Winning coach: Skip Bertman (4th title)
- MVP: Harry Berrios (LSU)
- Attendance: 28,196

1993 Southeastern Conference baseball standings
	Conf.				Overall
Team	W		L	PCT	W		L	PCT
Eastern
No. 20 Tennessee ^{x}‍‍‡‍^{y}	20	–	10	.667	45	–	20	.692
No. 29 South Carolina ‍‍‍^{y}	15	–	10	.600	39	–	20	.661
Kentucky ‍‍‍^{y}	14	–	14	.500	38	–	23	.623
Florida ‍‍‍	12	–	14	.462	33	–	25	.569
Vanderbilt ‍‍‍	11	–	15	.423	32	–	23	.582
Georgia ‍‍‍	10	–	18	.357	30	–	29	.508
Western
No. 1 LSU ^{x}‍†‍‡‍^{y}	18	–	8	.692	53	–	17	.757
No. 28 Auburn ‍‍‍^{y}	17	–	11	.607	40	–	23	.635
No. 25 Mississippi State ‍‍‍^{y}	17	–	12	.586	41	–	21	.661
Arkansas ‍‍‍	11	–	16	.407	33	–	26	.559
Alabama ‍‍‍	9	–	15	.375	27	–	25	.519
Ole Miss ‍‍‍	8	–	19	.296	31	–	25	.554
x – Division champion † – Conference champion ‡ – Tournament champion y – Invited to the NCAA tournament As of June 30, 1993; Rankings from Collegiate Baseball

The 1993 Southeastern Conference baseball tournament was the first year the SEC held separate tournaments for the Eastern Division and the Western Division. The Eastern Division tournament was held at Sarge Frye Field in Columbia, South Carolina, from May 20 through 23. The Western Division tournament was held at Alex Box Stadium in Baton Rouge, LA also from May 20 through 23. Tennessee won the Eastern Division tournament and LSU won the Western Division tournament. All games played in the tournament were added to the teams' records from the 24-game conference regular season.

As the tournament champion with the highest conference winning percentage, LSU was named SEC champion and awarded the league's automatic bid to the NCAA tournament.

== Regular-season results ==
Eastern Division
Team	W	L	Pct	GB	Seed
Tennessee	20	10	.667	—	1
South Carolina	15	10	.600	2.5	2
Kentucky	14	14	.500	5	3
Florida	12	14	.462	6	4
Vanderbilt	11	15	.423	7	5
Georgia	10	18	.357	9	6

Western Division
Team	W	L	Pct	GB	Seed
LSU	18	8	.692	—	1
Auburn	17	11	.607	2	2
Mississippi State	17	12	.586	2.5	3
Arkansas	11	16	.407	7.5	4
Alabama	9	15	.375	8	5
Ole Miss	8	19	.296	10.5	6

== Tournaments ==
=== Eastern Division ===
First round
6	Georgia	3
2	South Carolina	1
5	Vanderbilt	4
1	Tennessee	7
3	Kentucky	4
4	Florida	1

Second round
6	Georgia	5
4	Florida	0
1	Tennessee	7
3	Kentucky	9
2	South Carolina	7
5	Vanderbilt	11

Third round
6	Georgia	3
3	Kentucky	13
5	Vanderbilt	5
1	Tennessee	11

Semi-finals
1	Tennessee	17
6	Georgia	8

Finals
3	Kentucky	6	4
1	Tennessee	7	6

=== Western Division ===
First round
6	Ole Miss	1
1	LSU	6
5	Alabama	4
2	Auburn	13
4	Arkansas	5
3	Mississippi State	2

Second round
1	LSU	3
3	Mississippi State	5
6	Ole Miss	4
5	Alabama	2
2	Auburn	3
4	Arkansas	1
1	LSU	13
4	Arkansas	7

Third round
3	Mississippi State	3
6	Ole Miss	2
2	Auburn	5
1	LSU	16

Semi-finals
3	Mississippi State	13
2	Auburn	10

Finals
3	Mississippi State	3
1	LSU	7

== All-Tournament Teams ==
Position	Player	School
Eastern Division
1B	Todd Helton	Tennessee
2B	Nick Morrow	Vanderbilt
SS	Jeff Michael	Kentucky
3B	Terry Weaver	Georgia
C	James Northeimer	Tennessee
OF	Matt Bragga	Kentucky
OF	Rodney Close	Georgia
OF	Tom Thaemert	Kentucky
DH	Bard Hindersman	Kentucky
P	Alex Barylak	Georgia
P	Jason Carruth	Tennessee
MVP	Todd Helton	Tennessee

Position	Player	School
Western Division
1B	Brian Alyea	Auburn
2B	John Futrell	Ole Miss
SS	Russ Johnson	LSU
3B	Jason Williams	LSU
C	Mitch Duke	Auburn
OF	Harry Berrios	LSU
OF	Mike Neal	LSU
OF	Noah Muhammad	Mississippi State
DH	Travis Williams	Mississippi State
P	Gary Rath	Mississippi State
P	Will Hunt	LSU
MVP	Harry Berrios	LSU

== See also ==
- College World Series
- NCAA Division I Baseball Championship
- Southeastern Conference baseball tournament
