= 1993 Southwest Conference baseball tournament =

- Teams: 4
- Format: Double-elimination tournament
- Finals site: Disch–Falk Field; Austin, TX
- Champions: Baylor (3rd title)
- Winning coach: Mickey Sullivan (3rd title)

1993 Southwest Conference baseball standings
	Conf.				Overall
Team	W		L	PCT	W		L	PCT
No. 5 Texas A&M ‍†‍‍^{y}	15	–	3	.833	53	–	11	.828
Texas Tech ‍‍‍	11	–	7	.611	43	–	15	.741
No. 30 Baylor ‍‍‡‍^{y}	11	–	7	.611	41	–	19	.683
No. 6 Texas ‍‍‍^{y}	11	–	7	.611	51	–	16	.761
Rice ‍‍‍	7	–	11	.389	36	–	18	.667
TCU ‍‍‍	5	–	13	.278	34	–	22	.607
Houston ‍‍‍	3	–	15	.167	31	–	24	.564
† – Conference champion ‡ – Tournament champion y – Invited to the NCAA tournament As of June 30, 1993; Rankings from Collegiate Baseball

The 1993 Southwest Conference baseball tournament was the league's annual postseason tournament used to determine the Southwest Conference's (SWC) automatic bid to the 1993 NCAA Division I baseball tournament. The tournament was held from May 13 through 15 at Disch–Falk Field on the campus of The University of Texas in Austin, Texas.

The number 3 seed Baylor Bears went 3–0 to win the team's third SWC tournament under head coach Mickey Sullivan.

== Format and seeding ==
The tournament featured the top four finishers of the SWC's 7 teams in a double-elimination tournament.

Place	Team	Conference				Overall			Seed
Place	Team	W	L	%	GB	W	L	%	Seed
1	Texas A&M	15	3	.833	-	53	11	.828	1
2	Texas Tech	11	7	.611	4	43	15	.741	2
3	Baylor	11	7	.611	4	41	19	.683	3
4	Texas	11	7	.611	4	51	16	.761	4
5	Rice	7	11	.389	8	36	18	.667	-
6	TCU	5	13	.278	10	34	22	.607	-
7	Houston	3	15	.167	12	31	24	.564	-

== Tournament ==
Upper round 1
1	Texas A&M	7
4	Texas	21
2	Texas Tech	4
3	Baylor	6
Lower round 1
1	Texas A&M	10
2	Texas Tech	8

Upper final
4	Texas	4
3	Baylor	6
Lower final
4	Texas	11
1	Texas A&M	10

Final
3	Baylor	10	–
4	Texas	6	–
