= 1993 Arizona Wildcats baseball team =

American college baseball season

1993 Arizona Wildcats baseball

Midwest Regional
- Conference: Pacific-10 Conference
- CB: No. 9
- Record: 35–26 (16–14 Pac-10)
- Head coach: Jerry Kindall (21st season)
- Assistant coach: Jerry Stitt (15th season)
- Home stadium: Sancet Stadium

1993 Pacific-10 Conference baseball standings
	Conf.				Overall
Team	W		L	PCT	W		L	PCT
Northern
Oregon State ^{x}‍‍‍	15	–	6	.714	32	–	18	.640
Washington ‍‍‍	16	–	7	.696	39	–	19	.672
Washington State ‍‍‍	13	–	10	.565	34	–	24	.586
Portland State ‍‍‍	9	–	11	.450	31	–	27	.534
Gonzaga ‍‍‍	8	–	15	.348	17	–	36	.321
Portland ‍‍‍	5	–	17	.227	16	–	33	.327
Southern
No. 7 Arizona State ^{x}‍‍‍^{y}	19	–	11	.633	46	–	20	.697
No. 24 UCLA ‍‍‍^{y}	17	–	13	.567	37	–	23	.617
No. 9 Arizona ‍‍‍^{y}	16	–	14	.533	35	–	26	.574
No. 18 Southern California ‍‍‍^{y}	15	–	15	.500	35	–	29	.547
California ‍‍‍	13	–	17	.433	27	–	30	.474
Stanford ‍‍‍	10	–	20	.333	27	–	28	.491
x – Division champion y – Invited to the NCAA tournament As of June 30, 1993; Rankings from Collegiate Baseball

The 1993 Arizona Wildcats baseball team represented the University of Arizona during the 1993 NCAA Division I baseball season. The Wildcats played their home games at Frank Sancet Stadium. The team was coached by Jerry Kindall in his 21st season at Arizona. The Wildcats finished 35–26 overall and placed 3rd in the Pacific-10's Southern Division with a 16–14 record. Arizona reached the postseason for the 2nd straight season and the final time in Jerry Kindall's tenure and were placed as the 3-seed in the Midwest Regional, which was hosted by Oklahoma State University in Stillwater, Oklahoma. After falling into the loser's bracket with a loss to Auburn in their 1st game, the Wildcats rallied to win their next 3 against North Carolina State, Fordham and Oklahoma State. The team was ultimately eliminated 1 win (and 1 run) short of a College World Series appearance with a 10–11 loss in the regional final to host Oklahoma State.

== Previous season ==
The Wildcats finished the 1992 season with a record of 34–23 and 18–12 in conference play, finishing 1st in the "Six-Pac" (Pac-10 Southern). This was Arizona's final conference championship under Coach Kindall and would be their last for 20 years until clinching a share of the then-Pac-12 Conference championship in 2012. The Wildcats were selected to the postseason and were awarded the hosting of the West Regional at Sancet Stadium. This would be the final time Sancet Stadium would host postseason play and, coincidentally, was the last time the program would host a regional until the same 2012 season when the program would win its 4th College World Series title. The Wildcats were eliminated in 2 games following losses to Washington and Hawaii.

== Personnel ==
=== Roster ===
1993 Arizona Wildcats baseball roster
• Steven Arffa • George Arias • Tony Bouie • Tod Brown • Ryan Frace • Christopher Gump	• Kirt Kishita • Todd Landry • Richard Lemons • Andy Vincent • Robert Moen • Willie Morales • James Motte	• Todd Singelyn • John Tejcek • Jason Thompson • Gregory Wells • Ben White • Menno Wickey

=== Coaches ===
1993 Arizona Wildcats baseball coaching staff
- Jerry Kindall – Head coach
- Jerry Stitt – Assistant coach

== 1993 Schedule and results ==
1993 Arizona Wildcats baseball game log
Regular season
Date	Opponent	Site/Stadium	Score	Overall Record	Pac-10 Record
Jan 30	New Mexico	Sancet Stadium • Tucson, AZ	L 4–10	0–1	
Jan 31	New Mexico	Sancet Stadium • Tucson, AZ	W 12–3	1–1	
Feb 1	New Mexico	Sancet Stadium • Tucson, AZ	W 15–5	2–1	
Feb 5	New Mexico State	Sancet Stadium • Tucson, AZ	L 2–3	2–2	
Feb 6	New Mexico State	Sancet Stadium • Tucson, AZ	W 5–1	3–2	
Feb 11	Minnesota	Sancet Stadium • Tucson, AZ	W 18–3	4–2	
Feb 12	Minnesota	Sancet Stadium • Tucson, AZ	L 9–17	4–3	
Feb 13	Minnesota	Sancet Stadium • Tucson, AZ	W 15–10	5–3	
Feb 16	Cal State Dominguez Hills	Sancet Stadium • Tucson, AZ	W 17–13	6–3	
Feb 16	Cal State Dominguez Hills	Sancet Stadium • Tucson, AZ	W 9–2	7–3	
Feb 20	at USC	Dedeaux Field • Los Angeles, CA	L 11–15	7–4	0–1
Feb 20	at USC	Dedeaux Field • Los Angeles, CA	L 1–8	7–5	0–2
Feb 21	at USC	Dedeaux Field • Los Angeles, CA	W 10–2	8–5	1–2
Feb 26	Stanford	Sancet Stadium • Tucson, AZ	W 14–13	9–5	2–2
Feb 27	Stanford	Sancet Stadium • Tucson, AZ	W 13–8	10–5	3–2
Mar 1	Stanford	Sancet Stadium • Tucson, AZ	W 16–2	11–5	4–2
Mar 5	UCLA	Sancet Stadium • Tucson, AZ	L 8–10	11–6	4–3
Mar 6	UCLA	Sancet Stadium • Tucson, AZ	L 9–16	11–7	4–4
Mar 7	UCLA	Sancet Stadium • Tucson, AZ	L 15–20	11–8	4–5
Mar 9	Notre Dame	Sancet Stadium • Tucson, AZ	W 19–6	12–8	
Mar 10	Notre Dame	Sancet Stadium • Tucson, AZ	W 10–9	13–8	
Mar 12	at California	Evans Diamond • Berkeley, CA	L 8–10	13–9	4–6
Mar 13	at California	Evans Diamond • Berkeley, CA	W 7–2	14–9	5–6
Mar 14	at California	Evans Diamond • Berkeley, CA	L 7–8	14–10	5–7
Mar 15	at Fresno State	Pete Beiden Field • Fresno, CA	W 19–9	15–10	
Mar 16	vs Kansas State	Pete Beiden Field • Fresno, CA	W 6–1	16–10	
Mar 17	vs Texas Tech	Pete Beiden Field • Fresno, CA	L 0–4	16–11	
Mar 18	vs Southwest Missouri State	Pete Beiden Field • Fresno, CA	W 11–0	17–11	
Mar 18	vs St. John's	Pete Beiden Field • Fresno, CA	L 4–5	17–12	
Mar 19	vs Texas Tech	Pete Beiden Field • Fresno, CA	L 8–11	17–13	
Mar 23	Wright State	Sancet Stadium • Tucson, AZ	W 17–7	18–13	
Mar 24	Wright State	Sancet Stadium • Tucson, AZ	L 3–5	18–14	
Mar 27	USC	Sancet Stadium • Tucson, AZ	W 18–8	19–14	6–7
Mar 27	USC	Sancet Stadium • Tucson, AZ	W 7–4	20–14	7–7
Mar 28	USC	Sancet Stadium • Tucson, AZ	L 9–12	20–15	7–8
Apr 2	at Arizona State	Packard Stadium • Tempe, AZ	L 7–9	20–16	7–9
Apr 3	Arizona State	Sancet Stadium • Tucson, AZ	W 9–5	21–16	8–9
Apr 4	Arizona State	Sancet Stadium • Tucson, AZ	W 10–9	22–16	9–9
Apr 8	at UCLA	Jackie Robinson Stadium • Los Angeles, CA	L 0–5	22–17	9–10
Apr 9	at UCLA	Jackie Robinson Stadium • Los Angeles, CA	W 9–4	23–17	10–10
Apr 10	at UCLA	Jackie Robinson Stadium • Los Angeles, CA	W 8–7	24–17	11–10
Apr 13	at Grand Canyon	Brazell Stadium • Phoenix, AZ	L 7–14	24–18	
Apr 16	California	Sancet Stadium • Tucson, AZ	W 12–5	25–18	12–10
Apr 17	California	Sancet Stadium • Tucson, AZ	W 7–4	26–18	13–10
Apr 18	California	Sancet Stadium • Tucson, AZ	L 15–17	26–19	13–11
Apr 23	at Stanford	Sunken Diamond • Palo Alto, CA	L 6–9	26–20	13–12
Apr 24	at Stanford	Sunken Diamond • Palo Alto, CA	W 4–3	27–20	14–12
Apr 25	at Stanford	Sunken Diamond • Palo Alto, CA	W 16–8	28–20	15–12
Apr 30	Cal State Fullerton	Sancet Stadium • Tucson, AZ	W 11–9	29–20	
May 1	Cal State Fullerton	Sancet Stadium • Tucson, AZ	W 13–12	30–20	
May 2	Cal State Fullerton	Sancet Stadium • Tucson, AZ	L 9–11	30–21	
May 7	Grand Canyon	Sancet Stadium • Tucson, AZ	L 7–11	30–22	
May 8	Grand Canyon	Sancet Stadium • Tucson, AZ	W 21–5	31–22	
May 14	Arizona State	Sancet Stadium • Tucson, AZ	W 11–10	32–22	16–12
May 16	at Arizona State	Packard Stadium • Tempe, AZ	L 6–11	32–23	16–13
May 16	at Arizona State	Packard Stadium • Tempe, AZ	L 1–6	32–24	16–14
NCAA Midwest Regional
May 28	vs (4) Auburn	Allie P. Reynolds Stadium • Stillwater, OK	L 1–9	32–25	
May 29	vs (1) NC State	Allie P. Reynolds Stadium • Stillwater, OK	W 5–2	33–25	
May 30	vs (6) Fordham	Allie P. Reynolds Stadium • Stillwater, OK	W 18–7	34–25	
May 31	at (2) Oklahoma State	Allie P. Reynolds Stadium • Stillwater, OK	W 4–0	35–25	
May 31	at (2) Oklahoma State	Allie P. Reynolds Stadium • Stillwater, OK	L 10–11	35–26	

=== Midwest Regional ===
Midwest Regional Teams
(1) NC State Wolfpack	(6) Fordham Rams	(2) Oklahoma State Cowboys	(5) UConn Huskies	(3) Arizona Wildcats	(4) Auburn Tigers

at Stillwater, OK

First round
1	NC State	12
6	Fordham	4
2	Oklahoma State	9
5	UConn	8
3	Arizona	1
4	Auburn	9

Second round
1	NC State	2
3	Arizona	5
6	Fordham	5
5	UConn	0
2	Oklahoma State	14
4	Auburn	10
1	NC State	13
4	Auburn	2

Third round
3	Arizona	18
6	Fordham	7
2	Oklahoma State	8
1	NC State	3

Final
3	Arizona	4	10
2	Oklahoma State	0	11

== 1993 MLB draft ==
Player	Position	Round	Overall	MLB team
Tim Schweitzer	LHP	7	185	Seattle Mariners
George Arias	INF	7	187	California Angels
Jason Thompson	INF	9	254	San Diego Padres
Willie Morales	C	14	405	Oakland Athletics
Christopher Gump	INF	17	470	San Francisco Giants
Mike Schiefelbein	RHP	26	730	San Diego Padres
Todd Landry	INF	31	879	Milwaukee Brewers
John Tejcek	OF	32	885	Seattle Mariners
Richard Lemons	OF	32	895	Cleveland Indians
James Motte	INF	35	989	Minnesota Twins
Robert Ippolito	RHP	69	1641	Seattle Mariners
