= 1993 LSU Tigers baseball team =

Baseball team in America

1993 LSU Tigers baseball

National champions Southeastern Conference champions SEC Western Division Tournament champions
- Conference: Southeastern Conference
- Record: 53-17-1 (18-8 SEC)
- Head coach: Skip Bertman (10th year)
- Assistant coaches: Smoke Laval (10th year); Dane Canevari (3rd; year): Rick Smith (1st year)
- Home stadium: Alex Box Stadium

1993 Southeastern Conference baseball standings
	Conf.				Overall
Team	W		L	PCT	W		L	PCT
Eastern
No. 20 Tennessee ^{x}‍‍‡‍^{y}	20	–	10	.667	45	–	20	.692
No. 29 South Carolina ‍‍‍^{y}	15	–	10	.600	39	–	20	.661
Kentucky ‍‍‍^{y}	14	–	14	.500	38	–	23	.623
Florida ‍‍‍	12	–	14	.462	33	–	25	.569
Vanderbilt ‍‍‍	11	–	15	.423	32	–	23	.582
Georgia ‍‍‍	10	–	18	.357	30	–	29	.508
Western
No. 1 LSU ^{x}‍†‍‡‍^{y}	18	–	8	.692	53	–	17	.757
No. 28 Auburn ‍‍‍^{y}	17	–	11	.607	40	–	23	.635
No. 25 Mississippi State ‍‍‍^{y}	17	–	12	.586	41	–	21	.661
Arkansas ‍‍‍	11	–	16	.407	33	–	26	.559
Alabama ‍‍‍	9	–	15	.375	27	–	25	.519
Ole Miss ‍‍‍	8	–	19	.296	31	–	25	.554
x – Division champion † – Conference champion ‡ – Tournament champion y – Invited to the NCAA tournament As of June 30, 1993; Rankings from Collegiate Baseball

The 1993 LSU Tigers baseball team represented Louisiana State University in the 1993 NCAA Division I baseball season. The Tigers played their home games at Alex Box Stadium. The team was coached by Skip Bertman in his 10th season at LSU.

The Tigers won the College World Series, defeating the Wichita State Shockers in the championship game.

== Roster ==
1993 LSU Tigers roster
Pitchers: 10 Mike Sirotka - Senior; 16 Matt Malejko - Junior; 21 Ronnie Rantz - Junior; 23 Antonio Leonadri-Cattolica - Freshman; 24 Trey Rutledge - Junior; 26 Jeff Naquin - Sophomore; 27 Brett Laxton - Freshman; 28 Matt Chamberlain - Junior; 30 Sean Teague - Sophomore; 31 Will Hunt - Senior; 38 Henri Saunders - Senior; 39 Brian Winders - Freshman; 41 Bhrett McCabe - Sophomore; 42 Scott Schultz - Sophomore	Infielders: 1 Warren Morris - Freshman; 2 Brian Daugherty - Freshman; 8 Jason Williams - Freshman; 9 Russ Johnson - Sophomore; 11 Brad Wilson - Freshman; 12 Todd Walker - Sophomore; 13 Kenny Jackson - Senior; 14 Jessie Daigle - Senior; 20 Chad Cooley - Freshman; 32 Dustin Brandon - Freshman; 36 Tom Schwier - Freshman; Catchers: 3 Tim Lanier - Freshman; 6 Adrian Antonini - Junior; 7 Wade Bagley - Sophomore; 18 Scott Berardi - Sophomore; 37 Kevin Ward - Freshman	Outfielders: 17 Ryan Huffman - Freshman; 29 Mark Stocco - Junior; 33 Harry Berrios - Junior; 35 Armando Rios - Senior; 44 Jim Greely - Senior; Coaches: 15 Skip Bertman - 10th Season; 22 Smoke Laval - 10th Season; 11 Dane Canevari - 3rd Season; 51 Rick Smith - 1st Season

== Schedule ==
1993 LSU Tigers baseball game log

Regular season

February
Date	Opponent	Site/stadium	Score	Overall record	SEC record
February 22	Northwestern State	Alex Box Stadium	8-3	1–0	–
February 24	Centenary	Alex Box Stadium	19-0	2-0	–
February 26	vs. Mississippi State	Superdome	4-7	2–1	–
February 27	vs. Southern Miss	Superdome	8-4	3–1	–
February 28	vs. Mississippi	Superdome	4-6	3–2	–

March
Date	Opponent	Site/stadium	Score	Overall record	SEC record
March 3	Lamar	Alex Box Stadium	3-9	3-3	–
March 6	Central Florida	Alex Box Stadium	12-0	4-3	–
March 7	Central Florida	Alex Box Stadium	14-4	5-3	–
March 9	at Tulane	Turchin Stadium	14-7	6-3	–
March 10	Indiana State	Alex Box Stadium	10-0	7-3	–
March 11	Indiana State	Alex Box Stadium	8-1	8-3	–
March 13	Michigan	Alex Box Stadium	6-2	9-3	–
March 14	Michigan	Alex Box Stadium	9-8	10-3	–
March 17	Nicholls State	Alex Box Stadium	7-5	11-3	–
March 19	New Mexico	Alex Box Stadium	9-3	12-3	–
March 21	New Mexico	Alex Box Stadium	14-1	13-3	–
March 21	New Mexico	Alex Box Stadium	8-5	14-3	–
March 23	at Arkansas State	Tomlinson Stadium–Kell Field	9-0	15-3	–
March 24	at Arkansas State	Tomlinson Stadium–Kell Field	7-10	15-4	–
March 27	South Carolina	Alex Box Stadium	10-3	16-4	1–0
March 27	South Carolina	Alex Box Stadium	6-1	17-4	2–0
March 28	South Carolina	Alex Box Stadium	9-9	17-4-1	2–0-1
March 29	Louisiana College	Alex Box Stadium	10-3	18-4-1	–
March 30	Southern	Alex Box Stadium	10-8	19-4-1	–
March 31	New Orleans	Maestri Field	13-8	20-4-1	–

April
Date	Opponent	Site/stadium	Score	Overall record	SEC record
April 3	at Tennessee	Lindsey Nelson Stadium	1-8	20-5-1	2–1–1
April 3	at Tennessee	Lindsey Nelson Stadium	4-1	21-5-1	3–1–1
April 4	at Tennessee	Lindsey Nelson Stadium	2-6	21-6-1	3–2–1
April 6	at Northwestern State	H. Alvin Brown–C. C. Stroud Field	5-6	21-7-1	
April 10	Florida	Alex Box Stadium	1-2	21-8-1	3-3-1
April 10	Florida	Alex Box Stadium	11-3	22-8-1	4-3-1
April 11	Florida	Alex Box Stadium	16-2	23-8-1	5-3-1
April 12	SE Louisiana	Alex Box Stadium	8-7	24-8-1	-
April 13	McNeese State	Alex Box Stadium	15-11	25-8-1	–
April 17	at Mississippi	Swayze Field	8-0	26–8–1	6-3-1
April 17	at Mississippi	Swayze Field	2-1	27–8–1	7-3-1
April 18	at Mississippi	Swayze Field	6-5	28–8–1	8-3-1
April 19	SE Louisiana	Alex Box Stadium	9-1	29-8-1	-
April 20	at Southern	Lee-Hines Field	8-7	30-8-1	–
April 21	at McNeese State	Cowboy Diamond	3-5	30-9-1	–
April 24	at Arkansas	George Cole Field	3-0	31–9–1	9-3-1
April 24	at Arkansas	George Cole Field	4-2	32–9–1	10-3-1
April 25	at Arkansas	George Cole Field	8-2	33–9–1	11-3-1
April 26	Tulane	Alex Box Stadium	6-3	34–9–1	-
April 27	New Orleans	Alex Box Stadium	12-9	35–9–1	-
April 28	SW Louisiana	Alex Box Stadium	9-10	35–10–1	-

May
Date	Opponent	Site/stadium	Score	Overall record	SEC record
May 2	Alabama	Alex Box Stadium	1-3	35–11–1	11-4-1
May 4	vs. Centenary	Fair Grounds Field	18-3	36–11–1	-
May 8	Auburn	Alex Box Stadium	21-2	37–11–1	12-4-1
May 8	Auburn	Alex Box Stadium	8-9	37–12–1	12-5-1
May 9	Auburn	Alex Box Stadium	2-9	37–13–1	12-6-1
May 12	Arkansas State	Alex Box Stadium	9-1	38–13–1	-
May 13	Arkansas State	Alex Box Stadium	14-4	39–13–1	-
May 15	at Mississippi State	Dudy Noble Field	3-4	39–14–1	12-7-1
May 15	at Mississippi State	Dudy Noble Field	3-2	40–14–1	13-7-1
May 16	at Mississippi State	Dudy Noble Field	13-7	41–14–1	14-7-1

Post-season

SEC Western Division tournament
Date	Opponent	Site/stadium	Score	Overall record
May 20	vs. Mississippi	Alex Box Stadium	6-1	42–14–1
May 21	vs. Mississippi State	Alex Box Stadium	3-5	42–15–1
May 22	vs. Arkansas	Alex Box Stadium	13-7	43–15–1
May 22	vs. Auburn	Alex Box Stadium	13-7	44–15–1
May 23	vs. Mississippi State	Alex Box Stadium	7-3	45–15–1

NCAA tournament: South Regional
Date	Opponent	Site/stadium	Score	Overall record
May 27	vs. Western Carolina	Alex Box Stadium	7-2	46–15–1
May 28	vs. Kent State	Alex Box Stadium	12-15	46–16–1
May 29	vs. Baylor	Alex Box Stadium	13-6	47–16–1
May 29	vs. South Alabama	Alex Box Stadium	11-4	48–16–1
May 30	vs. South Alabama	Alex Box Stadium	9-4	49–16–1

NCAA tournament: College World Series
Date	Opponent	Site/stadium	Score	Overall record
June 4	vs. Long Beach State	Rosenblatt Stadium	7–1	50–16–1
June 6	vs. Texas A&M	Rosenblatt Stadium	13–8	51–16–1
June 9	vs. Long Beach State	Rosenblatt Stadium	8–10	51–17–1
June 11	vs. Long Beach State	Rosenblatt Stadium	6–5	52–17–1
June 12	vs. Wichita State	Rosenblatt Stadium	8–0	52–17–1

== Awards and honors ==
Adrian Antonini

- College World Series All-Tournament Team

Harry Berrios

- All-America Second Team
- All-SEC Second Team
- SEC Tournament Most Outstanding Player
- SEC Tournament All-Tournament Team

Jim Greely

- College World Series All-Tournament Team

Will Hunt

- SEC Tournament All-Tournament Team

Russ Johnson

- SEC Tournament All-Tournament Team

Brett Laxton

- College World Series All-Tournament Team
- All-America First Team
- National Freshman of the Year
- All-SEC First Team

Mike Neal

- SEC Tournament All-Tournament Team

Armando Rios

- College World Series All-Tournament Team

Mike Sirotka

- College World Series All-Tournament Team

Todd Walker

- College World Series Most Outstanding Player
- Golden Spikes Award Finalist
- All-America First Team
- SEC Player of the Year
- All-SEC First Team

Jason Williams

- SEC Tournament All-Tournament Team

== Tigers in the 1993 MLB draft ==
The following members of the LSU Tigers baseball program were drafted in the 1993 Major League Baseball draft.

Player	Position	Round	Overall	MLB team
Harry Berrios	OF	8th	231st	Baltimore Orioles
Matt Chamberlain	RHP	11th	318th	Pittsburgh Pirates
Mike Sirotka	LHP	15th	425th	Chicago White Sox
Mike Neal	3B	16th	447th	Cleveland Indians
Trey Rutledge	RHP	19th	540th	Cincinnati Reds
Will Hunt	LHP	31st	865th	Detroit Tigers
