= 1992 Arizona Wildcats baseball team =

American college baseball season

1992 Arizona Wildcats baseball

West Regional

Pacific-10 Southern Regular Season Champions
- Conference: Pacific-10 Conference
- CB: No. 17
- Record: 34–23 (18–12 Pac-10)
- Head coach: Jerry Kindall (20th season)
- Assistant coaches: Jerry Stitt (14th season); Jim Wing (20th season)
- Home stadium: Sancet Stadium

1992 Pacific-10 Conference baseball standings
	Conf.				Overall
Team	W		L	PCT	W		L	PCT
Northern
Washington ^{x}‍‍‍^{y}	20	–	10	.667	39	–	21	.650
Washington State ‍‍‍	16	–	14	.533	31	–	23	.574
Portland State ‍‍‍	15	–	15	.500	29	–	26	.527
Portland ‍‍‍	15	–	15	.500	26	–	23	.531
Gonzaga ‍‍‍	14	–	16	.467	22	–	30	.423
Oregon State ‍‍‍	15	–	6	.714	32	–	18	.640
Southern
No. 17 Arizona ^{x}‍‍‍^{y}	18	–	12	.600	34	–	23	.596
No. 15 Stanford ‍‍‍^{y}	17	–	13	.567	39	–	23	.629
Arizona State ‍‍‍^{y}	14	–	16	.467	32	–	24	.571
No. 10 California ‍‍‍^{y}	14	–	16	.467	35	–	28	.556
No. 24 UCLA ‍‍‍^{y}	14	–	16	.467	37	–	26	.587
Southern California ‍‍‍	14	–	16	.467	28	–	26	.519
x – Division champion y – Invited to the NCAA tournament As of June 30, 1992; Rankings from Collegiate Baseball

The 1992 Arizona Wildcats baseball team represented the University of Arizona during the 1992 NCAA Division I baseball season. The Wildcats played their home games at Frank Sancet Stadium. The team was coached by Jerry Kindall in his 20th season at Arizona. The Wildcats finished 34-23 overall and placed 1st in the Pacific-10's Southern Division with an 18–12 record. This was Arizona's final conference championship under Coach Kindall and would be their last for 20 years until clinching a share of the then-Pac-12 Conference championship in 2012. The Wildcats made the postseason for the 1st time since 1989 and were selected to host the West Regional at Sancet Stadium. This would be the final time Sancet Stadium would host postseason play and, coincidentally, was the last time the program would host a regional until the same 2012 season when the program would win its 4th College World Series title. The Wildcats lost back to back games to Washington and Hawaii to end their season.

== Previous season ==
The Wildcats finished the 1991 season with a record of 27-32 and 10–20 in conference play, finishing 6th in the "Six-Pac" (Pac-10 Southern). Arizona would miss the postseason for a 2nd straight season for the first time since missing 4 straight postseasons from 1981 to 1984.

== Personnel ==
=== Roster ===
1992 Arizona Wildcats baseball roster
• Jason Bates • Phil Echeverria • Billy Grajeda • Christopher Gump • Andy Vincent • Kirt Kishita	• Richard Lemons • Robert Moen • Willie Morales • Ron Oelschlager • Billy Owens • Don Parker	• Carlos Rico • Mike Schielfelbein • Tim Schweitzer • John Tejcek • Phil Tilicki

=== Coaches ===
1992 Arizona Wildcats baseball coaching staff
- Jerry Kindall - Head coach
- Jerry Stitt - Assistant coach
- Jim Wing - Assistant coach

== 1992 Schedule and results ==
1992 Arizona Wildcats baseball game log
Regular season
Date	Opponent	Site/Stadium	Score	Overall Record	Pac-10 Record
Jan 25	New Mexico	Sancet Stadium • Tucson, AZ	W 8-1	1-0	
Jan 26	New Mexico	Sancet Stadium • Tucson, AZ	W 15-11	2-0	
Jan 27	New Mexico	Sancet Stadium • Tucson, AZ	W 18-4	3-0	
Jan 31	at Hawaii	Rainbow Stadium • Honolulu, HI	L 6-7	3-1	
Feb 1	at Hawaii	Rainbow Stadium • Honolulu, HI	W 7-0	4-1	
Feb 2	at Hawaii	Rainbow Stadium • Honolulu, HI	L 3-6	4-2	
Feb 6	Minnesota	Sancet Stadium • Tucson, AZ	L 2-3	4-3	
Feb 8	Minnesota	Sancet Stadium • Tucson, AZ	W 9-0	5-3	
Feb 8	Minnesota	Sancet Stadium • Tucson, AZ	L 3-8	5-4	
Feb 12	New Mexico State	Sancet Stadium • Tucson, AZ	W 8-1	6-4	
Feb 12	New Mexico State	Sancet Stadium • Tucson, AZ	W 8-7	7-4	
Feb 14	Texas A&M	Sancet Stadium • Tucson, AZ	W 12-4	8-4	
Feb 15	Texas A&M	Sancet Stadium • Tucson, AZ	L 8-11	8-5	
Feb 16	Texas A&M	Sancet Stadium • Tucson, AZ	W 6-5	9-5	
Feb 20	Cal State Fullerton	Sancet Stadium • Tucson, AZ	W 19-15	10-5	
Feb 21	Cal State Fullerton	Sancet Stadium • Tucson, AZ	L 6-22	10-6	
Feb 22	Cal State Fullerton	Sancet Stadium • Tucson, AZ	L 5-16	10-7	
Feb 24	Cal State Dominguez Hills	Sancet Stadium • Tucson, AZ	W 12-7	11-7	
Feb 25	Cal State Dominguez Hills	Sancet Stadium • Tucson, AZ	W 9-6	12-7	
Feb 28	at USC	Dedeaux Field • Los Angeles, CA	W 1-0	13-7	1-0
Feb 29	at USC	Dedeaux Field • Los Angeles, CA	L 2-10	13-8	1-1
Mar 1	at USC	Dedeaux Field • Los Angeles, CA	W 2-1	14-8	2-1
Mar 6	UCLA	Sancet Stadium • Tucson, AZ	L 1-5	14-9	2-2
Mar 7	UCLA	Sancet Stadium • Tucson, AZ	W 4-3	15-9	3-2
Mar 13	at California	Evans Diamond • Berkeley, CA	W 11-2	16-9	4-2
Mar 17	vs Portland State	San Jose Municipal Stadium • San Jose, CA	W 12-10	17-9	
Mar 17	vs Princeton	San Jose Municipal Stadium • San Jose, CA	W 13-10	18-9	
Mar 19	vs Bradley	San Jose Municipal Stadium • San Jose, CA	L 2-4	18-10	
Mar 29	Stanford	Sancet Stadium • Tucson, AZ	W 5-2	19-10	5-2
Mar 29	Stanford	Sancet Stadium • Tucson, AZ	L 3-15	19-11	5-3
Mar 30	Stanford	Sancet Stadium • Tucson, AZ	W 11-6	20-11	6-3
Apr 3	at Arizona State	Packard Stadium • Tempe, AZ	L 6-7	20-12	6-4
Apr 4	at Arizona State	Packard Stadium • Tempe, AZ	W 6-4	21-12	7-4
Apr 5	at Arizona State	Packard Stadium • Tempe, AZ	L 7-8	21-13	7-5
Apr 7	at Grand Canyon	Brazell Stadium • Phoenix, AZ	L 9-12	21-14	
Apr 10	USC	Sancet Stadium • Tucson, AZ	L 2-4	21-15	7-6
Apr 11	USC	Sancet Stadium • Tucson, AZ	W 16-5	22-15	8-6
Apr 12	USC	Sancet Stadium • Tucson, AZ	W 11-8	23-15	9-6
Apr 16	at UCLA	Jackie Robinson Stadium • Los Angeles, CA	W 7-2	24-15	10-6
Apr 16	at UCLA	Jackie Robinson Stadium • Los Angeles, CA	L 4-8	24-16	10-7
Apr 17	at UCLA	Jackie Robinson Stadium • Los Angeles, CA	W 4-1	25-16	11-7
Apr 18	at UCLA	Jackie Robinson Stadium • Los Angeles, CA	L 2-7	25-17	11-8
Apr 24	at Stanford	Sunken Diamond • Palo Alto, CA	W 7-6	26-17	12-8
Apr 25	at Stanford	Sunken Diamond • Palo Alto, CA	L 8-19	26-18	12-9
Apr 26	at Stanford	Sunken Diamond • Palo Alto, CA	W 9-7	27-18	13-9
Apr 27	at California	Evans Diamond • Berkeley, CA	L 6-11	27-19	13-10
Apr 27	at California	Evans Diamond • Berkeley, CA	L 4-9	27-20	13-11
May 1	California	Sancet Stadium • Tucson, AZ	W 16-14	28-20	14-11
May 2	California	Sancet Stadium • Tucson, AZ	W 9-8	29-20	15-11
May 3	California	Sancet Stadium • Tucson, AZ	L 8-26	29-21	15-12
May 8	Grand Canyon	Sancet Stadium • Tucson, AZ	W 13-12	30-21	
May 9	Grand Canyon	Sancet Stadium • Tucson, AZ	W 11-10	31-21	
May 15	Arizona State	Sancet Stadium • Tucson, AZ	W 9-3	32-21	16-12
May 16	Arizona State	Sancet Stadium • Tucson, AZ	W 9-8	33-21	17-12
May 17	Arizona State	Sancet Stadium • Tucson, AZ	W 4-3	34-21	18-12
NCAA West Regional
May 22	(6) Washington	Sancet Stadium • Tucson, AZ	L 5-6	34-22	
May 23	(2) Hawaii	Sancet Stadium • Tucson, AZ	L 3-10	34-23	

=== West Regional ===
West Regional Teams
(1) Arizona Wildcats	(6) Washington Huskies	(2) Hawaii Rainbow Warriors	(5) Southeastern Louisiana Lions	(3) Pepperdine Waves	(4) Fresno State Bulldogs

at Tucson, AZ

First round
1	Arizona	5
6	Washington	6
2	Hawaii	0
5	SE Louisiana	8
3	Pepperdine	5*
4	Fresno State	4*

Second round
6	Washington	4
4	Fresno State	3
5	SE Louisiana	5
3	Pepperdine	8
1	Arizona	3
2	Hawaii	10

Third round
6	Washington	0
3	Pepperdine	11
5	SE Louisiana	3
2	Hawaii	10

Semifinals
6	Washington	3
2	Hawaii	9

Final
3	Pepperdine	3	9
2	Hawaii	6	0

== 1992 MLB draft ==
Player	Position	Round	Overall	MLB team
Billy Owens	INF	3	72	Baltimore Orioles
Jason Bates	INF	7	207	Colorado Rockies
Christopher Gump	INF	26	721	New York Mets
