= Pat Watkins (baseball) =

American baseball player (born 1972)

- Outfielder
- Born: September 2, 1972 (age 54); Raleigh, North Carolina, U.S.
- Batted: Right Threw: Right

MLB debut
- September 9, 1997, for the Cincinnati Reds

Last MLB appearance
- May 1, 1999, for the Colorado Rockies

MLB statistics
- Batting average: .236
- Home runs: 2
- Runs batted in: 15
- Stats at Baseball Reference

Teams
- Cincinnati Reds (1997–1998); Colorado Rockies (1999)

William Patrick Watkins (born September 2, 1972) is an American former Major League Baseball player who played outfield for the Cincinnati Reds and Colorado Rockies.

== Early life ==
Watkins had planned on playing football at Duke after graduating from Garner Magnet High School, and had even talked to their coach, Steve Spurrier, about playing under him. However, when Spurrier left to coach at the University of Florida and the coach who replaced him was not interested, Watkins had to change his plan. He went to East Carolina University to play baseball after his high school coach recommended him to the baseball coach there. At East Carolina, Watkins was an All-American and was drafted by the Cincinnati Reds in the 1st round (32nd pick) of the 1993 Major League Baseball draft.

== Major league career ==
Watkins made his major league debut on September 9, 1997 against the Chicago Cubs. Watkins played parts of two more seasons in the majors, 1998 with the Reds and 1999 with the Rockies.

== See also ==
- 1993 College Baseball All-America Team
