= 1993 Oklahoma State Cowboys baseball team =

1993 Oklahoma State Cowboys baseball

Big Eight champions Midwest Regional champions

College World Series, 4th
- Conference: Big Eight Conference

Ranking
- Coaches: No. 5
- CB: No. 4
- Record: 47–16 (16–8 Big 8)
- Head coach: Gary Ward (16th season)
- Pitching coach: Tom Holliday (16th season)
- Home stadium: Allie P. Reynolds Stadium

1993 Big Eight Conference baseball standings
	Conf.				Overall
Team	W		L	PCT	W		L	PCT
No. 4 Oklahoma State ‍†‍‡‍^{y}	16	–	8	.667	45	–	17	.726
No. 8 Kansas ‍‍‍^{y}	17	–	9	.654	39	–	19	.672
Missouri ‍‍‍	15	–	10	.600	30	–	19	.612
Nebraska ‍‍‍	16	–	12	.571	35	–	23	.603
Oklahoma ‍‍‍	13	–	14	.481	31	–	24	.564
Kansas State ‍‍‍	6	–	17	.261	15	–	34	.306
Iowa State ‍‍‍	5	–	18	.217	17	–	28	.378
† – Conference champion ‡ – Tournament champion y – Invited to the NCAA tournament As of June 30, 1993; Rankings from Collegiate Baseball

The 1993 Oklahoma State Cowboys baseball team represented the Oklahoma State University–Stillwater in the 1993 NCAA Division I baseball season. The Cowboys played their home games at Allie P. Reynolds Stadium. The team was coached by Gary Ward in his 16th year at Oklahoma State.

The Cowboys won the Midwest Regional to advance to the College World Series, where they were defeated by the Wichita State Shockers.

== Roster ==
1993 Oklahoma State Cowboys baseball team
Players
Coaches

#	Pos.	Name	B/T	Height	Weight	Year	Home town
	INF	Sal Bando Jr.	/	—	—		Mequon, Wisconsin
	RHP	Jason Bell	R/R	6 ft 3 in (1.91 m)	210 lb (95 kg)	Fr	Orlando, Florida
	LHP	Jake Benz	L/L	5 ft 9 in (1.75 m)	162 lb (73 kg)		Pleasant Hill, California
		Bobby Buzzard	/	—	—
		Thad Chaddrick	L/R	6 ft 0 in (1.83 m)	188 lb (85 kg)		Bridge City, Texas
		Chabon Childers	/	—	—
	P	Marcus Cuper	/	—	—
	RHP	Greg Dean	R/R	6 ft 1 in (1.85 m)	220 lb (100 kg)	Fr	Ada, Oklahoma
	RHP	Rob Gaiko	R/R	6 ft 3 in (1.91 m)	225 lb (102 kg)	So	Stillwater, Oklahoma
	INF	Carl Ginstead	S/R	5 ft 11 in (1.8 m)	195 lb (88 kg)		Lake Worth, Florida
	P	Brad Gore	/	—	—		Taloga, Oklahoma
	OF	last {{{last}}}	/	—	—		Cleveland, Texas
	P	Jay Hogue	/	—	—		Montgomery, Texas
	OF	Sean Hugo	L/L	6 ft 1 in (1.85 m)	195 lb (88 kg)		Oklahoma City, Oklahoma
	P	Billy Kanwisher	/	—	—
	P	Rob Linfante	/	—	—
	INF	Roberto Lopez	S/R	5 ft 9 in (1.75 m)	160 lb (73 kg)		Bayamón, Puerto Rico
		Angel Martinez	/	—	—
	P	Brent Nichols	/	—	—
	INF	Fred Ocasio	/	—	—	So	Bayamón, Puerto Rico
	P	Scott Pollan	/	—	—
	OF	Peter Prodanov	R/R	6 ft 1 in (1.85 m)	200 lb (91 kg)		Princeton Junction, New Jersey
	INF	Ernesto Rivera	/	—	—
		Skip Sharp	/	—	—
	INF	Hunter Triplett	/	—	—
	C	Joe Wallace	/	—	—		Granite City, Illinois
	RHP	Earl Wheeler	R/R	6 ft 2 in (1.88 m)	205 lb (93 kg)		Dexter, Missouri
	P	Dale Wicks	/	—	—

Head coach

20 Gary Ward

Assistant coach(es)

Wade Robertson

Pitching coach(es)

Tom Holliday

Legend

- (C) Team captain
- (S) Suspended
- (I) Ineligible
- Injured
- Current redshirt

Roster
Last update: March 18, 2021

== Schedule ==
1993 Oklahoma State Cowboys baseball game log
Regular season
February (4–1)

#	Date	Opponent	Site/stadium	Score	Overall record	Big 8 record
1	February 21	Southern Illinois	Allie P. Reynolds Stadium • Stillwater, Oklahoma	9–6	1–0	–
2	February 22	Southern Illinois	Allie P. Reynolds Stadium • Stillwater, Oklahoma	1–2	1–1	–
3	February 26	at Grand Canyon	Brazell Field • Phoenix, Arizona	5–4	2–1	–
4	February 27	at Grand Canyon	Brazell Field • Phoenix, Arizona	12–4	3–1	–
5	February 28	at Grand Canyon	Brazell Field • Phoenix, Arizona	4–3	4–1	–

March (10–6)

#	Date	Opponent	Site/stadium	Score	Overall record	Big 8 record
6	March 5	vs Houston	Moore Family Field • Lafayette, Louisiana	28–9	5–1	–
7	March 6	at Southwestern Louisiana	Moore Family Field • Lafayette, Louisiana	10–5	6–1	–
8	March 7	vs Ole Miss	Moore Family Field • Lafayette, Louisiana	4–3	7–1	–
9	March 9	at Abilene Christian	Crutcher Scott Field • Abilene, Texas	6–7	7–2	–
10	March 10	at Texas–Arlington	Clay Gould Ballpark • Arlington, Texas	13–26	7–3	–
11	March 14	New Mexico State	Allie P. Reynolds Stadium • Stillwater, Oklahoma	16–7	8–3	–
12	March 15	New Mexico State	Allie P. Reynolds Stadium • Stillwater, Oklahoma	8–1	9–3	–
13	March 16	Missouri Southern	Allie P. Reynolds Stadium • Stillwater, Oklahoma	13–0	10–3	–
14	March 17	Texas–Arlington	Allie P. Reynolds Stadium • Stillwater, Oklahoma	17–3	11–3	–
15	March 20	Iowa State	Allie P. Reynolds Stadium • Stillwater, Oklahoma	10–7	12–3	1–0
16	March 21	Iowa State	Allie P. Reynolds Stadium • Stillwater, Oklahoma	18–8	13–3	2–0
17	March 23	Kansas	Allie P. Reynolds Stadium • Stillwater, Oklahoma	14–4	14–3	3–0
18	March 24	Kansas	Allie P. Reynolds Stadium • Stillwater, Oklahoma	4–7	14–4	3–1
19	March 26	at Kansas	Hoglund Ballpark • Lawrence, Kansas	8–9	14–5	3–2
20	March 27	at Kansas	Hoglund Ballpark • Lawrence, Kansas	3–4	14–6	3–3
21	March 28	at Kansas	Hoglund Ballpark • Lawrence, Kansas	2–9	14–7	3–4

April (15–5)

#	Date	Opponent	Site/stadium	Score	Overall record	Big 8 record
22	April 2	Nebraska	Allie P. Reynolds Stadium • Stillwater, Oklahoma	7–9	14–8	3–5
23	April 2	Nebraska	Allie P. Reynolds Stadium • Stillwater, Oklahoma	13–2	15–8	4–5
24	April 3	Nebraska	Allie P. Reynolds Stadium • Stillwater, Oklahoma	11–5	16–8	5–5
25	April 6	Kansas State	Allie P. Reynolds Stadium • Stillwater, Oklahoma	5–3	17–8	6–5
26	April 7	Kansas State	Allie P. Reynolds Stadium • Stillwater, Oklahoma	14–13	18–8	7–5
27	April 10	at Iowa State	Cap Timm Field • Ames, Iowa	5–4	19–8	8–5
28	April 10	at Iowa State	Cap Timm Field • Ames, Iowa	9–6	20–8	9–5
29	April 11	at Iowa State	Cap Timm Field • Ames, Iowa	5–8	20–9	9–6
30	April 16	vs Oklahoma	Drillers Stadium • Tulsa, Oklahoma	0–4	20–10	9–7
31	April 17	vs Oklahoma	All Sports Stadium • Oklahoma City, Oklahoma	9–4	21–10	10–7
32	April 18	vs Oklahoma	All Sports Stadium • Oklahoma City, Oklahoma	17–5	22–10	11–7
33	April 19	at Arkansas	George Cole Field • Fayetteville, Arkansas	1–4	22–11	11–7
34	April 20	at Oklahoma	L. Dale Mitchell Baseball Park • Norman, Oklahoma	11–9	23–11	12–7
35	April 21	Oklahoma	Allie P. Reynolds Stadium • Stillwater, Oklahoma	12–10	24–11	13–7
36	April 23	at Kansas State	KSU Baseball Stadium • Manhattan, Kansas	24–4	25–11	14–7
37	April 24	at Kansas State	KSU Baseball Stadium • Manhattan, Kansas	17–8	26–11	15–7
38	April 25	at Kansas State	KSU Baseball Stadium • Manhattan, Kansas	5–4	27–11	16–7
39	April 26	Arkansas	Allie P. Reynolds Stadium • Stillwater, Oklahoma	4–1	28–11	16–7
40	April 27	at Wichita State	Eck Stadium • Wichita, Kansas	7–12	28–12	16–7
41	April 30	Texas Wesleyan	Allie P. Reynolds Stadium • Stillwater, Oklahoma	18–0	29–12	16–7

May (5–1)

#	Date	Opponent	Site/stadium	Score	Overall record	Big 8 record
42	May 1	Texas Wesleyan	Allie P. Reynolds Stadium • Stillwater, Oklahoma	11–2	30–12	16–7
43	May 1	Texas Wesleyan	Allie P. Reynolds Stadium • Stillwater, Oklahoma	13–0	31–12	16–7
44	May 7	Missouri	Allie P. Reynolds Stadium • Stillwater, Oklahoma	4–10	31–13	16–8
45	May 13	at Maine	Mahaney Diamond • Orono, Maine	2–1	32–13	16–8
46	May 14	at Maine	Mahaney Diamond • Orono, Maine	12–6	33–13	16–8
47	May 15	at Maine	Mahaney Diamond • Orono, Maine	9–8	34–13	16–8

Postseason
Big Eight Conference Tournament (5–1)

#	Date	Opponent	Site/stadium	Score	Overall record	Big 8 record
48	May 20	vs Kansas State	All Sports Stadium • Oklahoma City, Oklahoma	8–2	35–13	16–8
49	May 21	vs Missouri	All Sports Stadium • Oklahoma City, Oklahoma	8–4	36–13	16–8
50	May 22	vs Kansas	All Sports Stadium • Oklahoma City, Oklahoma	8–9	36–14	16–8
51	May 22	vs Nebraska	All Sports Stadium • Oklahoma City, Oklahoma	8–4	37–14	16–8
52	May 23	vs Kansas	All Sports Stadium • Oklahoma City, Oklahoma	6–4	38–14	16–8
53	May 23	vs Kansas	All Sports Stadium • Oklahoma City, Oklahoma	9–8	39–14	16–8

NCAA Midwest Regional (4–1)

#	Date	Opponent	Site/stadium	Score	Overall record	Big 8 record
54	May 28	Connecticut	Allie P. Reynolds Stadium • Stillwater, Oklahoma	9–5	40–14	16–8
55	May 29	Auburn	Allie P. Reynolds Stadium • Stillwater, Oklahoma	14–10	41–14	16–8
56	May 30	NC State	Allie P. Reynolds Stadium • Stillwater, Oklahoma	8–3	42–14	16–8
57	May 31	Arizona	Allie P. Reynolds Stadium • Stillwater, Oklahoma	0–4	42–15	16–8
58	May 31	Arizona	Allie P. Reynolds Stadium • Stillwater, Oklahoma	11–10	43–15	16–8

College World Series (2–2)

#	Date	Opponent	Site/stadium	Score	Overall record	Big 8 record
59	June 5	vs Texas	Johnny Rosenblatt Stadium • Omaha, Nebraska	5–6	43–16	16–8
60	June 7	vs Arizona State	Johnny Rosenblatt Stadium • Omaha, Nebraska	5–4	44–16	16–8
61	June 8	vs Texas	Johnny Rosenblatt Stadium • Omaha, Nebraska	7–6	45–16	16–8
62	June 10	vs Wichita State	Johnny Rosenblatt Stadium • Omaha, Nebraska	4–10	45–17	16–8

== Awards and honors ==
Jake Benz

- All-Big Eight Conference

Thad Chaddrick

- All-Big Eight Conference
- First Team All-American National Collegiate Baseball Writers Association

Rob Gaiko

- Big Eight Conference All-Tournament Team

Jason Heath

- College World Series All-Tournament Team

Sean Hugo

- Big Eight Conference All-Tournament Team

Roberto Lopez

- Big Eight Conference All-Tournament

Ernesto Rivera

- All-Big Eight Conference
- Second Team All-American American Baseball Coaches Association
- First Team All-American National Collegiate Baseball Writers Association

Hunter Triplett

- Big Eight Conference All-Tournament Team
- College World Series All-Tournament Team
