= 1993 Wichita State Shockers baseball team =

American college baseball season

1993 Wichita State Shockers baseball

MVC champion MVC Tournament champion Atlantic Regional champion

College World Series, 2nd
- Conference: Missouri Valley Conference

Ranking
- Coaches: No. 2
- CB: No. 2
- Record: 55–16 (17–3 MVC)
- Head coach: Gene Stephenson (16th season)
- Home stadium: Eck Stadium

1993 Missouri Valley Conference baseball standings
	Conf.				Overall
Team	W		L	PCT	W		L	PCT
No. 2 Wichita State ‍†‍‡‍^{y}	17	–	3	.850	58	–	17	.773
Southwest Missouri State ‍‍‍	14	–	6	.700	32	–	23	.582
Bradley ‍‍‍	13	–	7	.650	40	–	16	.714
Indiana State ‍‍‍	12	–	9	.571	35	–	23	.603
Creighton ‍‍‍	10	–	11	.476	32	–	25	.561
Illinois State ‍‍‍	10	–	11	.476	28	–	31	.475
Southern Illinois ‍‍‍	5	–	15	.250	22	–	29	.431
Northern Iowa ‍‍‍	1	–	20	.048	12	–	39	.235
† – Conference champion ‡ – Tournament champion y – Invited to the NCAA tournament As of June 30, 1993; Rankings from Collegiate Baseball

The 1993 Wichita State Shockers baseball team represented Wichita State University in the 1993 NCAA Division I baseball season. The Shockers played their home games at Eck Stadium in Wichita, Kansas. The team was coached by Gene Stephenson in his sixteenth season as head coach at Wichita State.

The Shockers reached the College World Series, finishing as the runner up to LSU. This was their third consecutive appearance in Omaha, and third time advancing to the final in five years.

== Personnel ==
=== Roster ===
1993 Wichita State Shockers roster
20 - Spike Anderson; 14 - Trent Babcock; 33 - Jason Bacon; 25 - Chris Bauer; 36 - Jason Bichelmeyer; 28 - Joel Bradberry; 22 - Shane Bryan; 39 - Nate Davis; 15 - Mike Drumright; 8 - Jason Ficken	18 - Alan Foster; 7 - Travis Huenfeld; 27 - Matt Klusener; 2 - John Lewallen; 4 - Tony Mills; 40 - Brent Minnik; 16 - Kenny Smith; 30 - Jay Stephenson; 31 - Randy Young	Pitchers: 9 - Travis Wyckoff; 19 - Jaime Bluma; 29 - Jason Jordan; 34 - Shane Dennis; 35 - Mike Brandley; 37 - Darren Dreifort; 41 - Brandon Baird; Infielders: 3 - Jason Adams; 12 - Joey Jackson; 17 - Toby Smith; 23 - Casey Blake	Catchers: 6 - Darren Wheeler; 13 - Adam McCullough; Outfielders: 1 - Richie Taylor; 11 - Tommy Tilma; 26 - Carl Hall

=== Coaches ===
1993 Wichita State Shockers baseball coaching staff
- 10 - Gene Stephenson - Head coach
- 5 - Jim Thomas - Assistant coach
- 24 - Brent Kemnitz - Pitching coach
- 32 - Tom Buchanan - Assistant coach

== Schedule ==
Legend
Wichita State win
Wichita State loss

1993 Wichita State Shockers baseball game log
Regular season (47–15)

February/March (18–7)
Date	Opponent	Site/stadium	Score	Overall record	MVC Record
Feb 27	UIC*	Eck Stadium • Wichita, KS	W 13–9	1–0	
Feb 27	UIC*	Eck Stadium • Wichita, KS	W 6–1	2–0	
Feb 28	UIC*	Eck Stadium • Wichita, KS	W 18–5	3–0	
Mar 3	Emporia State*	Eck Stadium • Wichita, KS	W 9–3	4–0	
Mar 4	Washington*	Eck Stadium • Wichita, KS	L 2–7	4–1	
Mar 5	Northwestern*	Eck Stadium • Wichita, KS	W 6–5	5–1	
Mar 6	Northwestern*	Eck Stadium • Wichita, KS	W 15–2	6–1	
Mar 7	Northwestern*	Eck Stadium • Wichita, KS	L 11–12	6–2	
Mar 9	at Kansas State*	KSU Baseball Stadium • Manhattan, KS	W 7–5	7–2	
Mar 10	Kansas State*	Eck Stadium • Wichita, KS	W 7–2	8–2	
Mar 13	Notre Dame*	Eck Stadium • Wichita, KS	W 14–11	9–2	
Mar 14	Notre Dame*	Eck Stadium • Wichita, KS	L 6–8	9–3	
Mar 15	Benedictine*	Eck Stadium • Wichita, KS	W 17–2	10–3	
Mar 16	Northeastern Illinois*	Eck Stadium • Wichita, KS	W 15–3	11–3	
Mar 17	Northeastern Illinois*	Eck Stadium • Wichita, KS	W 10–0	12–3	
Mar 20	vs Portland State*	Rainbow Stadium • Honolulu, HI	W 9–4	13–3	
Mar 21	vs Tulane*	Rainbow Stadium • Honolulu, HI	L 3–5	13–4	
Mar 22	vs Lewis–Clark State*	Rainbow Stadium • Honolulu, HI	W 12–1	14–4	
Mar 23	at Hawaii*	Rainbow Stadium • Honolulu, HI	L 9–10	14–5	
Mar 24	vs Northwestern*	Rainbow Stadium • Honolulu, HI	W 5–2	15–5	
Mar 25	vs Portland State*	Rainbow Stadium • Honolulu, HI	W 6–4	16–5	
Mar 26	vs Portland State*	Rainbow Stadium • Honolulu, HI	W 11–1	17–5	
Mar 27	at Hawaii*	Rainbow Stadium • Honolulu, HI	L 2–4	17–6	
Mar 30	at Arkansas*	George Cole Field • Fayetteville, AR	L 3–4	17–7	
Mar 31	Northwestern Oklahoma State*	Eck Stadium • Wichita, KS	W 11–5	18–7	

April (18–5)
Date	Opponent	Site/stadium	Score	Overall record	MVC Record
Apr 1	at Kansas*	Hoglund Ballpark • Lawrence, KS	L 6–10	18–8	
Apr 3	Northern Iowa	Eck Stadium • Wichita, KS	W 11–2	19–8	1–0
Apr 3	Northern Iowa	Eck Stadium • Wichita, KS	W 10–3	20–8	2–0
Apr 4	Northern Iowa	Eck Stadium • Wichita, KS	W 7–3	21–8	3–0
Apr 5	Arkansas*	Eck Stadium • Wichita, KS	W 9–1	22–8	
Apr 7	Central Missouri State*	Eck Stadium • Wichita, KS	W 11–6	23–8	
Apr 8	at Kansas State*	KSU Baseball Stadium • Manhattan, KS	W 11–2	24–8	
Apr 10	at Bradley	Shea Stadium • Peoria, IL	W 7–1	25–8	4–0
Apr 10	at Bradley	Shea Stadium • Peoria, IL	W 13–9^{10}	26–8	5–0
Apr 11	at Bradley	Shea Stadium • Peoria, IL	W 14–2	27–8	6–0
Apr 13	at Oral Roberts*	J. L. Johnson Stadium • Tulsa, OK	W 5–2	28–8	
Apr 14	Oral Roberts*	Eck Stadium • Wichita, KS	W 8–7^{12}	29–8	
Apr 16	Indiana State	Eck Stadium • Wichita, KS	L 2–4	29–9	6–1
Apr 17	Indiana State	Eck Stadium • Wichita, KS	W 10–5	30–9	7–1
Apr 18	Indiana State	Eck Stadium • Wichita, KS	W 10–5	31–9	8–1
Apr 20	Oklahoma City*	Eck Stadium • Wichita, KS	L 4–5	31–10	
Apr 21	Oral Roberts*	Eck Stadium • Wichita, KS	L 0–4	31–11	
Apr 22	Oral Roberts*	Eck Stadium • Wichita, KS	W 9–5	32–11	
Apr 23	Creighton	Eck Stadium • Wichita, KS	W 2–1	33–11	9–1
Apr 24	Creighton	Eck Stadium • Wichita, KS	W 6–4	34–11	10–1
Apr 25	Creighton	Eck Stadium • Wichita, KS	L 8–9	34–12	10–2
Apr 27	at Oklahoma State*	Allie P. Reynolds Stadium • Stillwater, OK	W 12–7	35–12	
Apr 29	Baker*	Eck Stadium • Wichita, KS	W 14–1	36–12	

May (11–3)
Date	Opponent	Site/stadium	Score	Overall record	MVC Record
May 1	at Southern Illinois	Abe Martin Field • Carbondale, IL	W 7–0	37–12	11–2
May 1	at Southern Illinois	Abe Martin Field • Carbondale, IL	W 10–1	38–12	12–2
May 4	Kansas*	Eck Stadium • Wichita, KS	L 4–6	38–13	
May 5	Grand Canyon*	Eck Stadium • Wichita, KS	W 6–5	39–13	
May 6	Grand Canyon*	Eck Stadium • Wichita, KS	W 10–5	40–13	
May 7	at Southwest Missouri State	Springfield, MO	W 8–7	41–13	13–2
May 8	at Southwest Missouri State	Springfield, MO	W 12–7	42–13	14–2
May 9	at Southwest Missouri State	Springfield, MO	L 6–7	42–14	14–3
May 12	South Alabama*	Eck Stadium • Wichita, KS	L 5–7	42–15	
May 12	South Alabama*	Eck Stadium • Wichita, KS	W 3–0	43–15	
May 13	Kansas State*	Eck Stadium • Wichita, KS	W 5–3	44–15	
May 14	Illinois State	Eck Stadium • Wichita, KS	W 7–2	45–15	15–3
May 15	Illinois State	Eck Stadium • Wichita, KS	W 7–5	46–15	16–3
May 16	Illinois State	Eck Stadium • Wichita, KS	W 5–1	47–15	17–3

Postseason (11–2)

MVC Tournament (4–0)
Date	Opponent	Site/stadium	Score	Overall record	Regional Record
May 19	Illinois State	Eck Stadium • Wichita, KS	W 6–5	48–15	1–0
May 20	Bradley	Eck Stadium • Wichita, KS	W 11–8	49–15	2–0
May 21	Creighton	Eck Stadium • Wichita, KS	W 9–7	50–15	3–0
May 22	Indiana State	Eck Stadium • Wichita, KS	W 22–9	51–15	4–0

NCAA Atlantic Regional (4–1)
Date	Opponent	Site/stadium	Score	Overall record	Regional Record
May 27	Ohio State	Russ Chandler Stadium • Atlanta, GA	W 14–5	52–15	1–0
May 28	South Carolina	Russ Chandler Stadium • Atlanta, GA	W 3–2	53–15	2–0
May 29	Georgia Tech	Russ Chandler Stadium • Atlanta, GA	W 5–4^{10}	54–15	3–0
May 30	Ohio State	Russ Chandler Stadium • Atlanta, GA	L 6–8	54–16	3–1
May 30	Ohio State	Russ Chandler Stadium • Atlanta, GA	W 5–3	55–16	4–1

College World Series (3–1)
Date	Opponent	Site/stadium	Score	Overall record	CWS record
June 5	Arizona State	Johnny Rosenblatt Stadium • Omaha, NE	W 4–3^{11}	56–16	1–0
June 7	Texas	Johnny Rosenblatt Stadium • Omaha, NE	W 7–6	57–16	2–0
June 10	Oklahoma State	Johnny Rosenblatt Stadium • Omaha, NE	W 10–4	58–16	3–0
June 12	LSU	Johnny Rosenblatt Stadium • Omaha, NE	L 0–8	58–17	3–1
