= 1993 NCAA Division I baseball rankings =

1993 NCAA Division I baseball season

Tournament

College World Series
- Champions: LSU
- Runners-up: Wichita State
- MOP: Todd Walker (LSU)

Seasons
- ← 1992 1994 →

The following polls make up the 1993 NCAA Division I baseball rankings. USA Today and ESPN began publishing the Coaches' Poll of 31 active coaches ranking the top 25 teams in the nation in 1992. Each coach is a member of the American Baseball Coaches Association. Baseball America began publishing its poll of the top 20 teams in college baseball in 1981. Beginning with the 1985 season, it expanded to the top 25. Collegiate Baseball Newspaper published its first human poll of the top 20 teams in college baseball in 1957, and expanded to rank the top 30 teams in 1961.

== USA Today/ESPN Coaches' Poll ==
Currently, only the final poll from the 1993 season is available.

Rank	Team
1	LSU
2	Wichita State
3	Long Beach State
4	Texas A&M
5	Oklahoma State
6	Texas
7	Arizona State
8	Kansas
9	Georgia Tech
10	Arizona
11	NC State
12	Fresno State
13	Florida State
14	Pepperdine
15	Cal State Fullerton
16	Clemson
17	Notre Dame
18	Ohio State
19	Tennessee
20	Southern California
21	Mississippi State
22	UCLA
23	North Carolina
24	Baylor
25	South Carolina

== Baseball America ==
Currently, only the final poll from the 1993 season is available.

Rank	Team
1	LSU
2	Texas A&M
3	Arizona State
4	Wichita State
5	Long Beach State
6	Oklahoma State
7	Texas
8	Georgia Tech
9	Arizona
10	Kansas
11	NC State
12	Pepperdine
13	Cal State Fullerton
14	Fresno State
15	Florida State
16	Notre Dame
17	Clemson
18	Tennessee
19	Southern California
20	UCLA
21	North Carolina
22	Ohio State
23	Baylor
24	Auburn
25	South Carolina

== Collegiate Baseball ==
Currently, only the final poll from the 1993 season is available.

Rank	Team
1	LSU
2	Wichita State
3	Long Beach State
4	Oklahoma State
5	Texas A&M
6	Texas
7	Arizona State
8	Kansas
9	Arizona
10	Fresno State
11	Notre Dame
12	Ohio State
13	Georgia Tech
14	St. John's
15	Cal State Northridge
16	Pepperdine
17	Clemson
18	Southern California
19	Cal State Fullerton
20	Tennessee
21	NC State
22	Florida State
23	North Carolina
24	UCLA
25	Mississippi State
26	South Alabama
27	Kent State
28	Auburn
29	South Carolina
30	Baylor
