= 1993 Texas A&M Aggies baseball team =

American college baseball season

1993 Texas A&M Aggies baseball

Southwest Conference champions Central I Regional champions

College World Series, T-5th
- Conference: Southwest Conference

Ranking
- Coaches: No. 4
- CB: No. 5
- Record: 53–11 (15–3 SWC)
- Head coach: Mark Johnson (9th season)
- Assistant coaches: Bill Hickey (9th season); David Crowson (4th season)
- Pitching coach: Jim Lawler (9th season)
- MVP: Brian Thomas
- Captains: Billy Harlan; Brian Thomas
- Home stadium: Olsen Field

1993 Southwest Conference baseball standings
	Conf.				Overall
Team	W		L	PCT	W		L	PCT
No. 5 Texas A&M ‍†‍‍^{y}	15	–	3	.833	53	–	11	.828
Texas Tech ‍‍‍	11	–	7	.611	43	–	15	.741
No. 30 Baylor ‍‍‡‍^{y}	11	–	7	.611	41	–	19	.683
No. 6 Texas ‍‍‍^{y}	11	–	7	.611	51	–	16	.761
Rice ‍‍‍	7	–	11	.389	36	–	18	.667
TCU ‍‍‍	5	–	13	.278	34	–	22	.607
Houston ‍‍‍	3	–	15	.167	31	–	24	.564
† – Conference champion ‡ – Tournament champion y – Invited to the NCAA tournament As of June 30, 1993; Rankings from Collegiate Baseball

The 1993 Texas A&M Aggies baseball team represented Texas A&M University in the 1993 NCAA Division I baseball season. The Aggies played their home games at Olsen Field. The team was coached by Mark Johnson in his 9th year at Texas A&M.

The Aggies won the Central I Regional to advance to the College World Series, where they were defeated by the Long Beach State Dirtbags.

== Roster ==
1993 Texas A&M Aggies baseball team
Players
Coaches

#	Pos.	Name	B/T	Height	Weight	Year	Home town
14	OF	Chad Alexander	R/R	6 ft 1 in (1.85 m)	190 lb (86 kg)	Fr	Lufkin, Texas
	RHP	Kevin Bosse	/	—	—		Navasota, TX
29	INF	Brian Bittiker	L/L	—	—	So	Ft. Worth, TX
	RHP	Jason Chesson	/	5 ft 8 in (1.73 m)	—	Jr	San Antonio, TX
16	OF	Steve Claybrook	L/R	6 ft 0 in (1.83 m)	170 lb (77 kg)	So	Corpus Christi, Texas
21	RHP	Chris Clemons	R/R	6 ft 4 in (1.93 m)	220 lb (100 kg)	So	Baytown, Texas
33	RHP	John Codrington	R/R	6 ft 5 in (1.96 m)	—	Fr	Austin, TX
22	INF	John Curl	L/R	6 ft 3 in (1.91 m)	205 lb (93 kg)	So	Logansport, Indiana
	INF	Lee Fedora	L/	—	—	So	College Station, Texas
9	INF	Eric Gonzalez	S/R	5 ft 4 in (1.63 m)	160 lb (73 kg)	Sr	Robstown, Texas
40	LHP	Jeff Granger	R/L	6 ft 4 in (1.93 m)	200 lb (91 kg)	Jr	Orangefield, Texas
23	INF	Billy Harlan	R/No	—	—	Jr	Corsicana, Texas
	INF	Robert Harris	R/R	5 ft 8 in (1.73 m)	175 lb (79 kg)	So	Houston, TX
5	INF	Jim Hicks	R/R	5 ft 5 in (1.65 m)	—	Fr	Houston, TX
	RHP	Jeff Jansky	/R	—	—
	C	Brian Johnson	R/R	—	—	Jr	College Station, TX
	RHP	Ryan Langston	/	—	—
28	C	Robert Lewis	R/R	5 ft 11 in (1.8 m)	190 lb (86 kg)	Jr	Los Angeles, California
	INF	David Martin	R/R	—	—
	LHP	Spencer McIntyre	/L	—	—		Canada
25	C	Matt Miller	R/R	—	—		San Diego, CA
24	OF	David Minor	R/R	6 ft 0 in (1.83 m)	210 lb (95 kg)	Fr	Lake Jackson, Texas
21	LHP	Trey Moore	L/L	6 ft 0 in (1.83 m)	190 lb (86 kg)	So	Keller, Texas
34	RHP	Brian Parker	/R	—	—		Ft. Worth
37	RHP	Matt Sherwood	/R	—	—
27	OF	Scott Smith	R/R	6 ft 3 in (1.91 m)	215 lb (98 kg)	So	Coppell, Texas
26	INF	Jason Stephens	R/R	—	—	Fr	Paris, TX
12	OF	Brian Thomas	L/R	5 ft 10 in (1.78 m)	190 lb (86 kg)	Sr	Portland, Oregon
	LHP	Rob Thomas	L/L	6 ft 1 in (1.85 m)	200 lb (91 kg)	Fr	Sinton, TX
44	C	Rob Trimble	L/R	6 ft 1 in (1.85 m)	195 lb (88 kg)	So	Carthage, Texas
18	C	Jason Washburn	R/R	—	—		Conroe, TX
45	LHP	Kelly Wunsch	/L	6 ft 5 in (1.96 m)	192 lb (87 kg)	Jr	Bellaire, Texas

Head coach

7 Mark Johnson

Assistant coach(es)

6 David Crowson

Base coach(es)

Bill Hickey

Pitching coach(es)

Jim Lawler

Legend

- (C) Team captain
- (S) Suspended
- (I) Ineligible
- Injured
- Current redshirt

== Schedule ==
1993 Texas A&M Aggies baseball game log
Regular season
February (14–0)

#	Date	Opponent	Site/stadium	Score	Overall record	SWC record
1	February 9	Dallast Baptist	Olsen Field • College Station, Texas	5–4	1–0	–
2	February 9	Dallas Baptist	Olsen Field • College Station, Texas	7–6	2–0	–
3	February 12	Washington	Olsen Field • College Station, Texas	3–2	3–0	–
4	February 13	Washington	Olsen Field • College Station, Texas	8–4	4–0	–
5	February 13	Washington	Olsen Field • College Station, Texas	7–4	5–0	–
6	February 14	Washington	Olsen Field • College Station, Texas	6–5	6–0	–
7	February 16	at Southwest Texas State	Unknown • San Marcos, Texas	9–2	7–0	–
8	February 19	Northeast Louisiana	Olsen Field • College Station, Texas	7–1	8–0	–
9	February 20	Northeast Louisiana	Olsen Field • College Station, Texas	9–1	9–0	–
10	February 23	at Sam Houston State	Unknown • Huntsville, Texas	7–0	10–0	–
11	February 24	Concordia Lutheran	Olsen Field • College Station, Texas	17–3	11–0	–
12	February 26	Texas–Pan American	Olsen Field • College Station, Texas	4–1	12–0	–
13	February 27	Texas–Pan American	Olsen Field • College Station, Texas	3–1	13–0	–
14	February 27	Texas–Pan American	Olsen Field • College Station, Texas	4–2	14–0	–

March (17–3)

#	Date	Opponent	Site/stadium	Score	Overall record	SWC record
15	March 2	Southwest Texas State	Olsen Field • College Station, Texas	0–1	14–1	–
16	March 2	Southwest Texas State	Olsen Field • College Station, Texas	5–2	15–1	–
17	March 6	Maine	Olsen Field • College Station, Texas	5–6	15–2	–
18	March 6	Maine	Olsen Field • College Station, Texas	11–2	16–2	–
19	March 7	Maine	Olsen Field • College Station, Texas	6–5	17–2	–
20	March 9	Illinois State	Olsen Field • College Station, Texas	12–3	18–2	–
21	March 10	Illinois State	Olsen Field • College Station, Texas	9–4	19–2	–
22	March 10	Illinois State	Olsen Field • College Station, Texas	4–0	20–2	–
23	March 14	at New Orleans	Maestri Field at Privateer Park • New Orleans, Louisiana	9–4	21–2	–
24	March 14	at New Orleans	Maestri Field at Privateer Park • New Orleans, Louisiana	5–3	22–2	–
25	March 15	at Southeastern Louisiana	Alumni Field • Hammond, Louisiana	5–1	23–2	–
26	March 20	at TCU	TCU Diamond • Fort Worth, Texas	8–2	24–2	1–0
27	March 20	at TCU	TCU Diamond • Fort Worth, Texas	6–0	25–2	2–0
28	March 21	at TCU	TCU Diamond • Fort Worth, Texas	2–3	25–3	2–1
29	March 23	Sam Houston State	Olsen Field • College Station, Texas	11–7	26–3	2–1
30	March 26	at Houston	Cougar Field • Houston, Texas	6–3	27–3	3–1
31	March 27	at Houston	Cougar Field • Houston, Texas	20–10	28–3	4–1
32	March 27	at Houston	Cougar Field • Houston, Texas	19–14	29–3	5–1
33	March 30	Mary Hardin–Baylor	Olsen Field • College Station, Texas	8–7	30–3	5–1
34	March 30	Mary Hardin–Baylor	Olsen Field • College Station, Texas	11–4	31–3	5–1

April (15–3)

#	Date	Opponent	Site/stadium	Score	Overall record	SWC record
35	April 2	Lubbock Christian	Olsen Field • College Station, Texas	16–0	32–3	5–1
36	April 2	Lubbock Christian	Olsen Field • College Station, Texas	18–3	33–3	5–1
37	April 6	at UT Arlington	Clay Gould Ballpark • Arlington, Texas	6–8	33–4	5–1
38	April 9	Texas Tech	Olsen Field • College Station, Texas	6–1	34–4	6–1
39	April 10	Texas Tech	Olsen Field • College Station, Texas	11–4	35–4	7–1
40	April 10	Texas Tech	Olsen Field • College Station, Texas	4–3	36–4	8–1
41	April 13	Sam Houston State	Olsen Field • College Station, Texas	6–7	36–5	8–1
42	April 13	Sam Houston State	Olsen Field • College Station, Texas	5–4	37–5	8–1
43	April 14	Texas Southern	Olsen Field • College Station, Texas	12–2	38–5	8–1
44	April 16	at Baylor	Ferrell Field • Waco, Texas	1–0	39–5	9–1
45	April 17	Baylor	Olsen Field • College Station, Texas	1–2	39–6	9–2
46	April 17	Baylor	Olsen Field • College Station, Texas	9–2	40–6	10–2
47	April 20	UT Arlington	Olsen Field • College Station, Texas	4–2	41–6	10–2
48	April 23	Rice	Olsen Field • College Station, Texas	7–6	42–6	11–2
49	April 24	Rice	Olsen Field • College Station, Texas	12–9	43–6	12–2
50	April 24	Rice	Olsen Field • College Station, Texas	16–10	44–6	13–2
51	April 27	UTSA	Olsen Field • College Station, Texas	2–0	45–6	13–2
52	April 30	Texas	Olsen Field • College Station, Texas	6–2	46–6	14–2

May (1–1)

#	Date	Opponent	Site/stadium	Score	Overall record	SWC record
53	May 1	at Texas	Disch–Falk Field • Austin, Texas	9–1	47–6	15–2
54	May 2	at Texas	Disch–Falk Field • Austin, Texas	1–3	47–7	15–3

Postseason
Southwest Conference Tournament (1–2)

#	Date	Opponent	Site/stadium	Score	Overall record	SWC record
55	May 13	at Texas	Disch–Falk Field • Austin, Texas	7–21	47–8	15–3
56	May 14	vs Texas Tech	Disch–Falk Field • Austin, Texas	10–8	48–8	15–3
57	May 15	at Texas	Disch–Falk Field • Austin, Texas	10–11	48–9	15–3

Central I Regional (4–0)

#	Date	Opponent	Site/stadium	Score	Overall record	SWC record
58	May 27	Yale	Olsen Field • College Station, Texas	13–1	49–9	15–3
59	May 28	Lamar	Olsen Field • College Station, Texas	10–5	50–9	15–3
60	May 29	UCLA	Olsen Field • College Station, Texas	11–4	51–9	15–3
61	May 30	North Carolina	Olsen Field • College Station, Texas	14–2	52–9	15–3

College World Series (1–2)

#	Date	Opponent	Site/stadium	Score	Overall record	SWC record
62	June 4	vs Kansas	Johnny Rosenblatt Stadium • Omaha, Nebraska	5–1	53–9	15–3
63	June 6	vs LSU	Johnny Rosenblatt Stadium • Omaha, Nebraska	8–13	53–10	15–3
64	June 8	vs Long Beach State	Johnny Rosenblatt Stadium • Omaha, Nebraska	2–6	53–11	15–3

== Awards and honors ==
Chris Clemons

- All-Southwest Conference

Lee Fedora

- All-Southwest Conference Tournament Team

Eric Gonzalez

- All-Southwest Conference

Jeff Granger

- First Team All-American Baseball America
- First Team All-American American Baseball Coaches Association
- First Team All-American National Collegiate Baseball Writers Association
- Third Team All-American Mizuno Collegiate Baseball
- All-Southwest Conference

Billy Harlan

- All-Southwest Conference Tournament Team

Robert Harris

- All-Southwest Conference

Trey Moore

- First Team All-American National Collegiate Baseball Writers Association
- Second Team All-American Mizuno Collegiate Baseball
- Third Team All-American Baseball America
- Third Team All-American American Baseball Coaches Association
- All-Southwest Conference

Brian Parker

- All-Southwest Conference

Brian Thomas

- First Team All-American American Baseball Coaches Association
- First Team All-American National Collegiate Baseball Writers Association
- Third Team All-American Baseball America
- Third Team All-American Mizuno Collegiate Baseball
- All-Southwest Conference
