= George Arias =

American baseball player (born 1972)

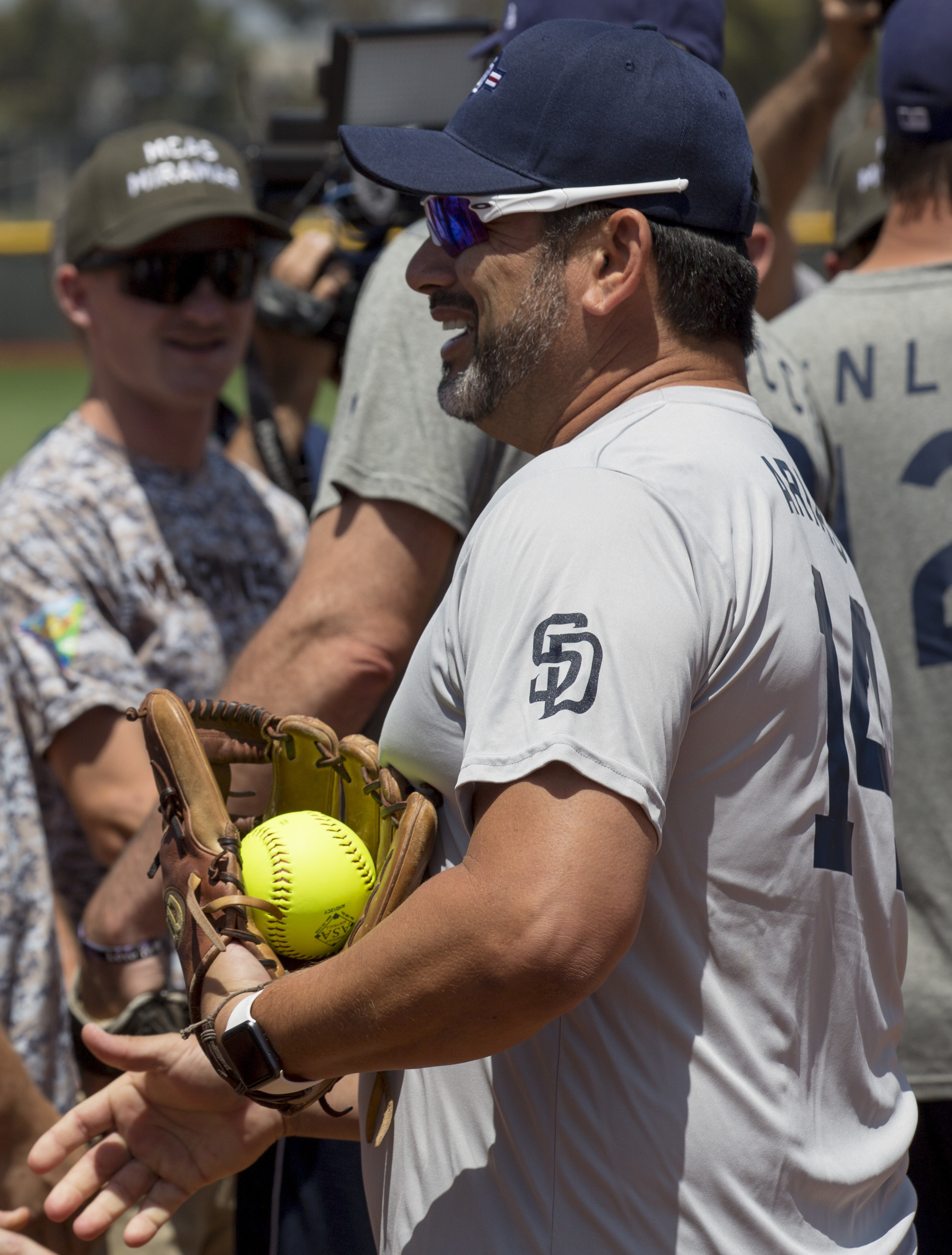
- Arias at MCAS Miramar in 2018
- Third baseman
- Born: March 12, 1972 (age 54); Tucson, Arizona, U.S.
- Batted: Right Threw: Right

Professional debut
- MLB: April 2, 1996, for the California Angels
- NPB: April 1, 2000, for the Orix BlueWave

Last appearance
- MLB: July 28, 1999, for the San Diego Padres
- NPB: July 30, 2006, for the Yomiuri Giants

MLB statistics
- Batting average: .238
- Home runs: 14
- Runs batted in: 55

NPB statistics
- Batting average: .259
- Home runs: 161
- Runs batted in: 436
- Stats at Baseball Reference

Teams
- California/Anaheim Angels (1996–1997); San Diego Padres (1997–1999); Orix BlueWave (2000–2001); Hanshin Tigers (2002–2004); Yomiuri Giants (2006)

George Alberto Arias (born March 12, 1972) is an American former baseball player in Major League Baseball and Nippon Professional Baseball.

== Career ==
Arias was drafted by the California Angels in the seventh round of the 1993 Major League Baseball draft after graduating from the University of Arizona. He made his major league debut in 1996, and played 84 games, hitting .238 with seven home runs and 28 RBI. He went back and forth between the majors and minor leagues after that.

In August 1997, the Angels traded Arias to the San Diego Padres as the player to be named later in the earlier trade that sent Ryan Hancock and Stevenson Agosto to the Padres for Rickey Henderson. He played with the Padres until 1999, before joining the Orix BlueWave in Japan.

Arias became the regular third baseman in his first year with the BlueWave, and was the team's best power hitter, hitting 38 home runs in 2001. He was a slow but solid fielder, and had a strong arm. Arias was a very streaky hitter, and had a very low batting average with runners in scoring position. He signed with the Hanshin Tigers in 2002, and hit 38 home runs with 107 RBI in 2003, contributing to the Tigers' league championship. He also won a Golden Glove award at first base, and the Best Nine award that year. He left the Tigers after 2004, as they dropped him as they were making a bid to sign Yokohama BayStars foreign star Tyrone Woods, before the Chunichi Dragons got him, and signed a minor league deal with the Washington Nationals in 2005, but was cut at the start of the season. He played in the Mexican League for the rest of the year.

Arias was signed by the Yomiuri Giants in June 2006, and made his debut with the Giants in July as an outfielder. He was unable to repeat his previous success, and was demoted to the minors after playing 17 games. He hit only .167 his last year, and was cut at the end of 2006.

In 639 games in NPB, Arias hit .259 with 169 home runs and 436 RBI.

== See also ==
- 1993 College Baseball All-America Team
