= 1993 Arizona State Sun Devils baseball team =

American college baseball season

1993 Arizona State Sun Devils baseball

NCAA West Regional champions

College World Series, 0–2
- Conference: Pacific-10 Conference
- Record: 46–20 (19–11 Pac-10)
- Head coach: Jim Brock (23rd year)
- Home stadium: Packard Stadium

1993 Pacific-10 Conference baseball standings
	Conf.				Overall
Team	W		L	PCT	W		L	PCT
Northern
Oregon State ^{x}‍‍‍	15	–	6	.714	32	–	18	.640
Washington ‍‍‍	16	–	7	.696	39	–	19	.672
Washington State ‍‍‍	13	–	10	.565	34	–	24	.586
Portland State ‍‍‍	9	–	11	.450	31	–	27	.534
Gonzaga ‍‍‍	8	–	15	.348	17	–	36	.321
Portland ‍‍‍	5	–	17	.227	16	–	33	.327
Southern
No. 7 Arizona State ^{x}‍‍‍^{y}	19	–	11	.633	46	–	20	.697
No. 24 UCLA ‍‍‍^{y}	17	–	13	.567	37	–	23	.617
No. 9 Arizona ‍‍‍^{y}	16	–	14	.533	35	–	26	.574
No. 18 Southern California ‍‍‍^{y}	15	–	15	.500	35	–	29	.547
California ‍‍‍	13	–	17	.433	27	–	30	.474
Stanford ‍‍‍	10	–	20	.333	27	–	28	.491
x – Division champion y – Invited to the NCAA tournament As of June 30, 1993; Rankings from Collegiate Baseball

The 1993 Arizona State Sun Devils baseball team represented Arizona State University in the 1993 NCAA Division I baseball season. The Sun Devils played their home games at Packard Stadium, and played as part of the Pacific-10 Conference. The team was coached by Jim Brock in his twenty-third season as head coach at Arizona State.

The Sun Devils reached the College World Series, their fifteenth appearance in Omaha, where they finished tied for seventh place after losing to eventual runner-up Wichita State and fourth place Oklahoma State.

== Personnel ==
=== Roster ===
1993 Arizona State Sun Devils roster
Pitchers: Marc Barcelo - Junior; Mike Fenton - Senior; Noah Peery - Junior; Kevin Rawitzer - Senior; Dax Winslett - Junior; Mike Rensmeyer - Senior; Mike Corominas - Freshman; Brent Smith - Junior; Steve Brody - Senior; Joe Stoddard - Junior; Catchers: Todd Cady - Sophomore; Paul Lo Duca - Junior; Jake Steinkemper - Freshman	Infielders: Bill Dunn - Junior; Cody McKay - Freshman; Doug Newstrom - Junior; Antone Williamson - Sophomore; Sal Cardinale - Senior; Antone Williamson - Sophomore; Greg Clapinski - Freshman; Todd Delnoce - Junior; Scott Kortmeyer - Freshman; Santiago Rivera - Junior; Outfielders: Jacob Cruz - Sophomore; Brian Lootens - Senior; Scott Shores - Junior; Billy McGonigle - Junior; Sean Tyler - Junior

=== Coaches ===
1993 Arizona State Sun Devils baseball coaching staff
- Jim Brock - Head coach - 22nd year
- John Pierson - Hitting Coach
- Bill Kinneberg - Pitching Coach
- George Lopez - Assistant Coach

== Schedule and results ==
Legend
Arizona State win
Arizona State loss

1993 Arizona State Sun Devils baseball game log
Regular season

January
Date	Opponent	Site/stadium	Score	Overall record	Pac-10 record
Jan 28	at Hawaii*	Rainbow Stadium • Honolulu, HI	L 4–9	0–1	
Jan 29	at Hawaii*	Rainbow Stadium • Honolulu, HI	W 22–6	1–1	
Jan 30	at Hawaii*	Rainbow Stadium • Honolulu, HI	W 4–2	2–1	
Jan 31	at Hawaii*	Rainbow Stadium • Honolulu, HI	W 10–4	3–1	

February
Date	Opponent	Site/stadium	Score	Overall record	Pac-10 record
Feb 2	Southern Utah*	Packard Stadium • Tempe, AZ	W 7–0	4–1	
Feb 3	Southern Utah*	Packard Stadium • Tempe, AZ	W 8–7	5–1	
Feb 5	TCU*	Packard Stadium • Tempe, AZ	W 5–4	6–1	
Feb 6	TCU*	Packard Stadium • Tempe, AZ	W 7–2	7–1	
Feb 7	TCU*	Packard Stadium • Tempe, AZ	W 11–10	8–1	
Feb 11	BYU*	Packard Stadium • Tempe, AZ	W 11–10	9–1	
Feb 12	BYU*	Packard Stadium • Tempe, AZ	L 7–12	9–2	
Feb 13	BYU*	Packard Stadium • Tempe, AZ	W 11–10	10–2	
Feb 19	Eastern Michigan*	Packard Stadium • Tempe, AZ	W 13–12	11–2	
Feb 20	Eastern Michigan*	Packard Stadium • Tempe, AZ	W 23–2	12–2	
Feb 21	Eastern Michigan*	Packard Stadium • Tempe, AZ	W 16–1	13–2	
Feb 23	New Mexico*	Packard Stadium • Tempe, AZ	W 14–3	14–2	
Feb 24	New Mexico*	Packard Stadium • Tempe, AZ	L 8–9	14–3	
Feb 26	at UCLA	Jackie Robinson Stadium • Los Angeles, CA	L 8–9^{11}	14–4	0–1
Feb 27	at UCLA	Jackie Robinson Stadium • Los Angeles, CA	W 4–3	15–4	1–1
Feb 28	at UCLA	Jackie Robinson Stadium • Los Angeles, CA	W 10–3	16–4	2–1

March
Date	Opponent	Site/stadium	Score	Overall record	Pac-10 record
Mar 5	at California	Evans Diamond • Berkeley, CA	L 1–2	16–5	2–2
Mar 6	at California	Evans Diamond • Berkeley, CA	L 5–7	16–6	2–3
Mar 7	at California	Evans Diamond • Berkeley, CA	L 11–12	16–7	2–4
Mar 8	Notre Dame*	Packard Stadium • Tempe, AZ	L 4–11	16–8	
Mar 12	Southern California	Packard Stadium • Tempe, AZ	L 3–4	16–9	2–5
Mar 13	Southern California	Packard Stadium • Tempe, AZ	L 6–10	16–10	2–6
Mar 14	Southern California	Packard Stadium • Tempe, AZ	W 6–5	17–10	3–6
Mar 16	at UNLV*	Rebel Field • Paradise, NV	W 10–2	18–10	
Mar 17	at UNLV*	Rebel Field • Paradise, NV	W 15–12	19–10	
Mar 19	Rice*	Packard Stadium • Tempe, AZ	W 11–3	20–10	
Mar 20	Rice*	Packard Stadium • Tempe, AZ	L 4–7	20–11	
Mar 21	Rice*	Packard Stadium • Tempe, AZ	W 15–10	21–11	
Mar 22	UTSA*	Packard Stadium • Tempe, AZ	W 12–8	22–11	
Mar 23	UTSA*	Packard Stadium • Tempe, AZ	W 11–0	23–11	
Mar 26	at Stanford	Sunken Diamond • Stanford, CA	W 12–2	24–11	4–6
Mar 27	at Stanford	Sunken Diamond • Stanford, CA	W 3–1	25–11	5–6
Mar 28	at Stanford	Sunken Diamond • Stanford, CA	W 6–5	26–11	6–6
Mar 30	at Grand Canyon*	Brazell Stadium • Phoenix, AZ	L 3–5	26–12	

April
Date	Opponent	Site/stadium	Score	Overall record	Pac-10 record
Apr 2	Arizona	Packard Stadium • Tempe, AZ	W 9–7	27–12	7–6
Apr 3	at Arizona	Frank Sancet Stadium • Tucson, AZ	L 5–9	27–13	7–7
Apr 4	at Arizona	Frank Sancet Stadium • Tucson, AZ	L 9–10	27–14	7–8
Apr 6	Grand Canyon*	Packard Stadium • Tempe, AZ	W 14–11	28–14	
Apr 8	California	Packard Stadium • Tempe, AZ	W 11–1	29–14	8–8
Apr 9	California	Packard Stadium • Tempe, AZ	W 11–4	30–14	9–8
Apr 10	California	Packard Stadium • Tempe, AZ	W 11–2	31–14	10–8
Apr 16	at Southern California	Dedeaux Field • Los Angeles, CA	W 6–3	32–14	11–8
Apr 17	at Southern California	Dedeaux Field • Los Angeles, CA	W 14–3	33–14	12–8
Apr 18	at Southern California	Dedeaux Field • Los Angeles, CA	W 11–3	34–14	13–8
Apr 20	UNLV*	Packard Stadium • Tempe, AZ	W 4–2	35–14	
Apr 21	UNLV*	Packard Stadium • Tempe, AZ	W 13–12	36–14	
Apr 23	UCLA	Packard Stadium • Tempe, AZ	W 11–3	37–14	14–8
Apr 24	UCLA	Packard Stadium • Tempe, AZ	W 9–3	38–14	15–8
Apr 25	UCLA	Packard Stadium • Tempe, AZ	L 5–9	38–15	15–9
Apr 27	Grand Canyon*	Packard Stadium • Tempe, AZ	L 4–7	38–16	
Apr 30	Stanford	Packard Stadium • Tempe, AZ	W 7–1	39–16	16–9

May
Date	Opponent	Site/stadium	Score	Overall record	Pac-10 record
May 1	Stanford	Packard Stadium • Tempe, AZ	L 3–5	39–17	16–10
May 2	Stanford	Packard Stadium • Tempe, AZ	W 9–8	40–17	17–10
May 14	at Arizona	Frank Sancet Stadium • Tucson, AZ	L 10–11	40–18	17–11
May 15	Arizona	Packard Stadium • Tempe, AZ	W 11–6	41–18	18–11
May 16	Arizona	Packard Stadium • Tempe, AZ	W 6–1	42–18	19–11

Postseason

NCAA West Regional
Date	Opponent	Seed	Site/stadium	Score	Overall record	Reg Record
May 21	(6) George Mason	(1)	Packard Stadium • Tempe, AZ	W 13–4	43–18	1–0
May 22	(4) Minnesota	(1)	Packard Stadium • Tempe, AZ	W 6–5	44–18	2–0
May 23	(2) Cal State Northridge	(1)	Packard Stadium • Tempe, AZ	W 9–0	45–18	3–0
May 23	(5) St. John's	(1)	Packard Stadium • Tempe, AZ	W 12–2	46–18	4–0

College World Series
Date	Opponent	Seed	Site/stadium	Score	Overall record	CWS record
June 5	(7) Wichita State	(2)	Johnny Rosenblatt Stadium • Omaha, NE	L 3–4^{11}	46–19	0–1
June 7	(6) Oklahoma State	(2)	Johnny Rosenblatt Stadium • Omaha, NE	L 4–5	46–20	0–2
