= 1993 Texas Longhorns baseball team =

American college baseball season

1993 Texas Longhorns baseball

NCAA Central II Regional champions

College World Series, 1–2
- Conference: Southwest Conference
- CB: No. 6
- Record: 51–16 (11–7 SWC)
- Head coach: Cliff Gustafson (26th year)
- Home stadium: Disch–Falk Field

1993 Southwest Conference baseball standings
	Conf.				Overall
Team	W		L	PCT	W		L	PCT
No. 5 Texas A&M ‍†‍‍^{y}	15	–	3	.833	53	–	11	.828
Texas Tech ‍‍‍	11	–	7	.611	43	–	15	.741
No. 30 Baylor ‍‍‡‍^{y}	11	–	7	.611	41	–	19	.683
No. 6 Texas ‍‍‍^{y}	11	–	7	.611	51	–	16	.761
Rice ‍‍‍	7	–	11	.389	36	–	18	.667
TCU ‍‍‍	5	–	13	.278	34	–	22	.607
Houston ‍‍‍	3	–	15	.167	31	–	24	.564
† – Conference champion ‡ – Tournament champion y – Invited to the NCAA tournament As of June 30, 1993; Rankings from Collegiate Baseball

The 1993 Texas Longhorns baseball team represented the University of Texas at Austin in the 1993 NCAA Division I baseball season. The Longhorns played their home games at Disch–Falk Field. The team was coached by Cliff Gustafson in his 26th season at Texas.

The Longhorns reached the College World Series, where they recorded a win and a loss against Oklahoma State and a loss to eventual runner-up Wichita State.

== Personnel ==
=== Roster ===
1993 Texas Longhorns roster
Pitchers: 16 - Jay Vaught; 21 - Ryan Kjos; 23 - Brooks Kieschnick; 37 - Robert Olivo; 42 - J. D. Smart; Catchers: 1 - Joel Williamson	Infielders: 2 - Tony Vasut; 11 - Stephen Larkin; 14 - Braxton Hickman; Outfielders: 12 - Shea Morenz; 40 - Darrick Duke	Unknown: 1 - Joel Williamson; 3 - Tim Harkrider; 5 - Greg Merrell; 6 - Chad Blessing; 7 - Jerry Taylor; 8 - Marcus Hendry; 9 - Steve Heinrich; 10 - Peter Gardere; 13 - Mark Prather; 15 - Jeff Conway; 17 - JoJo Hinojosa; 19 - Kenny Tipton; 24 - David Hood; 25 - Mark Lummus; 27 - Mark Senterfitt; 31 - Brian Cravey; 33 - Greg Hillman; 34 - James Juergens-Danhof; 35 - J. P. Webb; 38 - C. L. Baskin; 41 - Chad Smith

=== Coaches ===
1993 Texas Longhorns baseball coaching staff
- Cliff Gustafson – Head coach – 26th year
- Tommy Harmon – Assistant coach – 4th year
- Howard Bushong – Assistant coach – 3rd year
- Deron Gustafson – Assistant coach – 10th year
- Mark Brewer – Assistant coach – 1st year
- Chuck Hartenstein – Assistant coach – 1st year

== Schedule and results ==
Legend
Texas win
Texas loss
Tie

1993 Texas Longhorns baseball game log
Regular season

February
Date	Opponent	Site/stadium	Score	Overall record	SWC record
Feb 2	Mary Hardin–Baylor*	Disch–Falk Field • Austin, TX	W 7–2	1–0	
Feb 2	Mary Hardin–Baylor*	Disch–Falk Field • Austin, TX	L 7–9	1–1	
Feb 5	Miami (FL)*	Disch–Falk Field • Austin, TX	W 17–6	2–1	
Feb 6	Miami (FL)*	Disch–Falk Field • Austin, TX	W 7–6	3–1	
Feb 7	Miami (FL)*	Disch–Falk Field • Austin, TX	W 12–11	4–1	
Feb 9	St. Mary's*	Disch–Falk Field • Austin, TX	W 8–5	5–1	
Feb 12	Cal State Fullerton*	Disch–Falk Field • Austin, TX	W 13–11	6–1	
Feb 13	Cal State Fullerton*	Disch–Falk Field • Austin, TX	L 5–7	6–2	
Feb 14	Cal State Fullerton*	Disch–Falk Field • Austin, TX	W 5–1	7–2	
Feb 16	Schreiner*	Disch–Falk Field • Austin, TX	W 17–6	8–2	
Feb 19	Southwestern Louisiana*	Disch–Falk Field • Austin, TX	W 10–3	9–2	
Feb 20	Southwestern Louisiana*	Disch–Falk Field • Austin, TX	W 10–7	10–2	
Feb 21	Southwestern Louisiana*	Disch–Falk Field • Austin, TX	W 13–7	11–2	
Feb 23	Texas Lutheran*	Disch–Falk Field • Austin, TX	W 9–5	12–2	
Feb 23	Texas Lutheran*	Disch–Falk Field • Austin, TX	W 12–0	13–2	
Feb 26	Texas–Arlington*	Disch–Falk Field • Austin, TX	W 7–4	14–2	
Feb 27	Texas–Arlington*	Disch–Falk Field • Austin, TX	W 8–6	15–2	

March
Date	Opponent	Site/stadium	Score	Overall record	SWC record
Mar 2	Howard Payne*	Disch–Falk Field • Austin, TX	W 11–1	16–2	
Mar 2	Howard Payne*	Disch–Falk Field • Austin, TX	W 19–6	17–2	
Mar 5	Creighton*	Disch–Falk Field • Austin, TX	W 7–6	18–2	
Mar 6	Creighton*	Disch–Falk Field • Austin, TX	W 11–0	19–2	
Mar 7	Creighton*	Disch–Falk Field • Austin, TX	W 5–4	20–2	
Mar 9	Oklahoma*	Disch–Falk Field • Austin, TX	W 10–5	21–2	
Mar 10	Oklahoma*	Disch–Falk Field • Austin, TX	L 8–11	21–3	
Mar 13	Lamar*	Disch–Falk Field • Austin, TX	W 2–0	22–3	
Mar 14	Lamar*	Disch–Falk Field • Austin, TX	W 12–4	23–3	
Mar 15	Lubbock Christian*	Disch–Falk Field • Austin, TX	W 11–3	24–3	
Mar 16	Lubbock Christian*	Disch–Falk Field • Austin, TX	L 7–9	24–4	
Mar 20	Houston	Disch–Falk Field • Austin, TX	L 1–4	24–5	0–1
Mar 20	Houston	Disch–Falk Field • Austin, TX	W 8–7	25–5	1–1
Mar 21	Houston	Disch–Falk Field • Austin, TX	W 8–5	26–5	2–1
Mar 22	Emporia State*	Disch–Falk Field • Austin, TX	W 15–1	27–5	
Mar 23	Emporia State*	Disch–Falk Field • Austin, TX	W 12–2	28–5	
Mar 24	Southwest Texas State*	Disch–Falk Field • Austin, TX	W 11–4	29–5	
Mar 26	Dallas Baptist*	Disch–Falk Field • Austin, TX	W 8–7	30–5	
Mar 27	Dallas Baptist*	Disch–Falk Field • Austin, TX	W 8–4	31–5	
Mar 27	Dallas Baptist*	Disch–Falk Field • Austin, TX	W 5–2	32–5	
Mar 30	UTSA*	Disch–Falk Field • Austin, TX	W 8–5	33–5	

April/May
Date	Opponent	Site/stadium	Score	Overall record	SWC record
Apr 2	TCU	Disch–Falk Field • Austin, TX	W 3–2	34–5	3–1
Apr 3	TCU	Disch–Falk Field • Austin, TX	W 6–3	35–5	4–1
Apr 3	TCU	Disch–Falk Field • Austin, TX	W 8–7	36–5	5–1
Apr 6	at Oklahoma*	L. Dale Mitchell Baseball Park • Norman, OK	L 4–9	36–6	
Apr 9	Baylor	Disch–Falk Field • Austin, TX	W 2–1	37–6	6–1
Apr 10	at Baylor	Ferrell Field • Waco, TX	L 4–7	37–7	6–2
Apr 10	at Baylor	Ferrell Field • Waco, TX	L 6–8	37–8	6–3
Apr 16	at Rice	Cameron Field • Houston, TX	W 10–0	38–8	7–3
Apr 17	at Rice	Cameron Field • Houston, TX	W 4–3	39–8	8–3
Apr 18	at Rice	Cameron Field • Houston, TX	W 13–9	40–8	9–3
Apr 19	Grand Canyon*	Disch–Falk Field • Austin, TX	W 16–1	41–8	
Apr 20	Grand Canyon*	Disch–Falk Field • Austin, TX	W 4–2	42–8	
Apr 23	at Texas Tech	Dan Law Field • Lubbock, TX	W 4–2	43–8	10–3
Apr 24	at Texas Tech	Dan Law Field • Lubbock, TX	L 6–13	43–9	10–4
Apr 25	at Texas Tech	Dan Law Field • Lubbock, TX	L 4–5	43–10	10–5
Apr 30	at Texas A&M	Olsen Field • College Station, TX	L 2–6	43–11	10–6
May 1	Texas A&M	Disch–Falk Field • Austin, TX	L 1–	43–12	10–7
May 2	Texas A&M	Disch–Falk Field • Austin, TX	W 3–1	44–12	11–7

Postseason

SWC Tournament
Date	Opponent	Seed	Site/stadium	Score	Overall record	SWC record
May 13	(1) Texas A&M	(4)	Disch–Falk Field • Austin, TX	W 21–7	45–12	1–0
May 14	(3) Baylor	(4)	Disch–Falk Field • Austin, TX	L 4–9	45–13	1–1
May 15	(1) Texas A&M	(4)	Disch–Falk Field • Austin, TX	W 11–10	46–13	2–1
May 15	(3) Baylor	(4)	Disch–Falk Field • Austin, TX	L 6–10	46–14	2–2

NCAA Central II Regional
Date	Opponent	Seed	Site/stadium	Score	Overall record	NCAAT record
May 28	(6) McNeese State	(1)	Disch–Falk Field • Austin, TX	W 7–4	47–14	1–0
May 29	(3) Kentucky	(1)	Disch–Falk Field • Austin, TX	W 8–3	48–14	2–0
May 30	(4) Southern California	(1)	Disch–Falk Field • Austin, TX	W 11–3	49–14	3–0
May 31	(4) Southern California	(1)	Disch–Falk Field • Austin, TX	W 3–2	50–14	4–0

College World Series
Date	Opponent	Seed	Site/stadium	Score	Overall record	CWS record
June 5	(6) Oklahoma State	(3)	Johnny Rosenblatt Stadium • Omaha, NE	W 6–5	51–14	1–0
June 7	(7) Wichita State	(3)	Johnny Rosenblatt Stadium • Omaha, NE	L 6–7	51–15	1–1
June 8	(6) Oklahoma State	(3)	Johnny Rosenblatt Stadium • Omaha, NE	L 6–7	51–16	1–2
