= Travis Williams (sports executive) =

American attorney, president of the Pittsburgh Pirates

Travis Williams is an American attorney and sports front office executive. He is the president of the Pittsburgh Pirates of Major League Baseball.

Williams is from Indianapolis, Indiana. He earned his bachelor's degree from Pennsylvania State University and his Juris Doctor from the Duquesne University School of Law. He was a partner at the law firm Reed Smith, and served as outside counsel for the Pirates. He joined the Pittsburgh Penguins of the National Hockey League (NHL) in 2008, becoming chief operating officer in 2011. He left the Penguins to become the president of business operations for the NHL's New York Islanders in 2018. Williams succeeded Frank Coonelly as president of the Pirates in October 2019.

Williams and his wife, Nikki, have six children.
