= 1993 NCAA Division I baseball tournament =

- Season: 1993
- Teams: 48
- Finals site: Johnny Rosenblatt Stadium; Omaha, NE
- Champions: LSU (2nd title)
- Runner-up: Wichita State (6th CWS Appearance)
- Winning coach: Skip Bertman (2nd title)
- MOP: Todd Walker (LSU)

The 1993 NCAA Division I baseball tournament was played at the end of the 1993 NCAA Division I baseball season to determine the national champion of college baseball. The tournament concluded with eight teams competing in the College World Series, a double-elimination tournament in its forty seventh year. Eight regional competitions were held to determine the participants in the final event. Each region was composed of six teams, resulting in 48 teams participating in the tournament at the conclusion of their regular season, and in some cases, after a conference tournament. The forty-seventh tournament's champion was LSU, coached by Skip Bertman. The Most Outstanding Player was Todd Walker of LSU.

== Regionals ==
The opening rounds of the tournament were played across eight regional sites across the country, each consisting of a six-team field. Each regional tournament is double-elimination, however region brackets are variable depending on the number of teams remaining after each round. The winners of each regional advanced to the College World Series.

Bold indicates winner.

=== Atlantic Regional ===
at Atlanta, GA

First round
1	**Georgia Tech**	**4**
6	Liberty	1
2	**South Carolina**	**6**
5	East Carolina	5
3	**Wichita State**	**14**
4	Ohio State	5

Second round
1	Georgia Tech	4
4	**Ohio State**	**7**
6	Liberty	0
5	**East Carolina**	**6**
2	South Carolina	2
3	**Wichita State**	**3**
1	**Georgia Tech**	**12**
2	South Carolina	0

Third round
4	**Ohio State**	**6**
5	East Carolina	2
1	Georgia Tech	4
3	**Wichita State**	**5**^{10}

Final
4	Ohio State	**8**	3
3	**Wichita State**	6	**5**

=== Central I Regional ===
at College Station, TX

First round
1	**Texas A&M**	**13**
6	Yale	1
2	North Carolina	8
5	**Hawaii**	**9**
3	**UCLA**	**6**
4	Lamar	1

Second round
1	**Texas A&M**	**10**
4	Lamar	5
5	Hawaii	4
3	**UCLA**	**9**
6	Yale	6
2	**North Carolina**	**11**

Third round
1	**Texas A&M**	**11**
3	UCLA	4
5	Hawaii	8
2	**North Carolina**	**10**

Semifinals
3	UCLA	5
2	**North Carolina**	**8**

Final
1	**Texas A&M**	**14**	–
2	North Carolina	2	–

=== Central II Regional ===
at Austin, TX

First round
1	**Texas**	**7**
6	McNeese State	4
2	**Cal State Fullerton**	**11**
5	Maine	5
3	Kentucky	1
4	**USC**	**7**

Second round
1	**Texas**	**8**
3	Kentucky	3
2	Cal State Fullerton	2
4	**USC**	**5**
6	**McNeese State**	**16**
5	Maine	3

Third round
1	**Texas**	**11**
4	USC	3
2	**Cal State Fullerton**	**2**
6	McNeese State	0

Semifinals
4	**USC**	**5**
2	Cal State Fullerton	2

Final
1	**Texas**	**3**	—
4	USC	2	—

=== East Regional ===
at Tallahassee, FL

First round
1	**Long Beach State**	**11**
6	UCF	6
2	**Florida State**	**4**
5	South Florida	2
3	Mississippi State	1
4	**Notre Dame**	**15**

Second round
1	**Long Beach State**	**2**
3	Mississippi State	1
2	**Florida State**	**7**^{10}
4	Notre Dame	3
6	**UCF**	**4**
5	South Florida	3

Third round
1	**Long Beach State**	**4**
2	Florida State	1
4	**Notre Dame**	**12**
6	UCF	3

Semifinals
2	Florida State	3
4	**Notre Dame**	**4**

Final
1	**Long Beach State**	**13**	—
4	Notre Dame	3	—

=== Mideast Regional ===
at Knoxville, TN

First round
1	**Tennessee**	**7**
6	UNC-Charlotte	4
2	**Clemson**	**7**
5	Rutgers	3
3	Kansas	3
4	**Fresno State**	**4**

Second round
1	Tennessee	2
3	**Kansas**	**3**
6	UNC-Charlotte	1
5	**Rutgers**	**5**
2	**Clemson**	**10**
4	Fresno State	3
1	Tennessee	2
4	**Fresno State**	**6**

Third round
3	**Kansas**	**8**
5	Rutgers	2
2	Clemson	4
4	**Fresno State**	**11**

Semifinals
3	**Kansas**	**9**
2	Clemson	1

Final
3	**Kansas**	**3**^{10}
4	Fresno State	2

=== Midwest Regional ===
at Stillwater, OK

First round
1	**NC State**	**12**
6	Fordham	4
2	**Oklahoma State**	**9**
5	UConn	8
3	Arizona	1
4	**Auburn**	**9**

Second round
1	NC State	2
3	**Arizona**	**5**
6	**Fordham**	**5**
5	UConn	0
2	**Oklahoma State**	**14**
4	Auburn	10
1	**NC State**	**13**
4	Auburn	2

Third round
3	**Arizona**	**18**
6	Fordham	7
2	**Oklahoma State**	**8**
1	NC State	3

Final
3	Arizona	**4**	10
2	**Oklahoma State**	0	**11**

=== South Regional ===
at Baton Rouge, LA

First round
1	**LSU**	**7**
6	Western Carolina	2
2	Miami (FL)	3
5	**South Alabama**	**7**
3	Kent State	1
4	**Baylor**	**4**

Second round
1	LSU	12
3	**Kent State**	**15**
6	**Western Carolina**	**10**
2	Miami (FL)	5
5	**South Alabama**	**9**
4	Baylor	3
1	**LSU**	**13**
4	Baylor	6

Third round
3	**Kent State**	**8**
6	Western Carolina	5
5	South Alabama	4
1	**LSU**	**11**

Semifinals
3	Kent State	6
5	**South Alabama**	**7**

Final
5	South Alabama	4
1	**LSU**	**9**

=== West Regional ===
at Tempe, AZ

First round
1	**Arizona State**	**13**
6	George Mason	4
2	**Cal State Northridge**	**3**
5	St. John's	1
3	**Pepperdine**	**4**
4	Minnesota	1

Second round
1	**Arizona State**	**6**
4	Minnesota	5
2	**Cal State Northridge**	**7**
3	Pepperdine	6
6	George Mason	9
5	**St. John's**	**16**

Third round
1	**Arizona State**	**9**
2	Cal State Northridge	0
3	Pepperdine	1
5	**St. John's**	**4**

Semifinals
2	Cal State Northridge	10
5	**St. John's**	**11**

Final
1	**Arizona State**	**12**	—
5	St. John's	2	—

== College World Series ==
Texas and Texas A&M became the last schools to represent the Southwest Conference in the CWS. The SWC folded following the 1996 baseball season, with membership split among the Big 12, Conference USA and the WAC.

=== Participants ===
Seeding	School	Conference	Record (conference)	Head coach	CWS appearances	CWS best finish	CWS record
1	Texas A&M	SWC	52–9 (15–3)	Mark Johnson	2 (last: 1964)	6th (1951)	1–4
2	Arizona State	Pac-10	46–18 (19–11)	Jim Brock	15 (last: 1988)	1st (1965, 1967, 1969, 1977, 1981)	50–25
3	Texas	SWC	50–14 (11–7)	Cliff Gustafson	26 (last: 1992)	1st (1949, 1950, 1975, 1983)	63–45
4	Long Beach State	Big West	43–17 (17–4)	Dave Snow	2 (last: 1991)	6th (1991)	1–4
5	LSU	SEC	49–16–1 (18–8)	Skip Bertman	5 (last: 1991)	1st (1991)	11–8
6	Oklahoma State	Big 8	43–15 (16–8)	Gary Ward	16 (last: 1990)	1st (1959)	36–30
7	Wichita State	MVC	55–16 (17–3)	Gene Stephenson	5 (last: 1992)	1st (1989)	13–8
8	Kansas	Big 8	45–16 (17–9)	Dave Bingham	0 (last: none)	none	0–0

=== Results ===
==== Bracket ====
First round
1	Texas A&M	5
8	Kansas	1
4	Long Beach State	1
5	LSU	7
8	Kansas	1
4	Long Beach State	6
2	Arizona State	3
7	Wichita State	4^{11}
3	Texas	6
6	Oklahoma State	5
2	Arizona State	4
6	Oklahoma State	5

Second round
1	Texas A&M	8
5	LSU	13
1	Texas A&M	2
4	Long Beach State	6
7	Wichita State	7
3	Texas	6
3	Texas	6
6	Oklahoma State	7

Semi-finals
5	LSU	8	6
4	Long Beach State	10	5
7	Wichita State	10	—
6	Oklahoma State	4	—

Finals
5	LSU	8
7	Wichita State	0

==== Game results ====
Date	Game	Winner	Score	Loser	Notes
June 4	Game 1	Texas A&M	5 - 1	Kansas	
June 4	Game 2	LSU	7 - 1	Long Beach State	
June 5	Game 3	Wichita State	4 - 3 (11 innings)	Arizona State	
June 5	Game 4	Texas	6 - 5	Oklahoma State	
June 6	Game 5	Long Beach State	6 - 1	Kansas	Kansas eliminated
June 6	Game 6	LSU	13 - 8	Texas A&M	
June 7	Game 7	Oklahoma State	5 - 4	Arizona State	Arizona State eliminated
June 7	Game 8	Wichita State	7 - 6	Texas	
June 8	Game 9	Long Beach State	6 - 2	Texas A&M	Texas A&M eliminated
June 8	Game 10	Oklahoma State	7 - 6	Texas	Texas eliminated
June 9	Game 11	Long Beach State	10 - 8	LSU	
June 10	Game 12	Wichita State	10 - 4	Oklahoma State	Oklahoma State eliminated
June 11	Game 13	LSU	6 - 5	Long Beach State	Long Beach State eliminated
June 12	Final	LSU	8 - 0	Wichita State	LSU wins CWS

== All-Tournament Team ==
The following players were members of the College World Series All-Tournament Team.

Position	Player	School
P	Brett Laxton	LSU
P	Mike Sirotka	LSU
C	Adrian Antonini	LSU
1B	Hunter Triplett	Oklahoma State
2B	Todd Walker (MOP)	LSU
3B	Casey Blake	Wichita State
SS	Jason Adams	Wichita State
OF	Jim Greely	LSU
OF	Jason Heath	Oklahoma State
OF	Armando Rios	LSU
DH	Jeff Liefer	Long Beach State

=== Notable players ===
- Arizona State: Jacob Cruz, Paul Lo Duca, Cody McKay, Antone Williamson
- Kansas: Jeff Berblinger
- Long Beach State: Gabe Gonzalez, Jeff Liefer
- LSU: Russ Johnson, Brett Laxton, Armando Rios, Mike Sirotka, Todd Walker
- Oklahoma State: Sal Bando, Jr.
- Texas: Brooks Kieschnick, Stephen Larkin, J.D. Smart
- Texas A&M: Chris Clemons, Jeff Granger, Trey Moore, Kelly Wunsch
- Wichita State: Casey Blake, Jaime Bluma, Darren Dreifort

== See also ==
- 1993 NCAA Division I softball tournament
- 1993 NCAA Division II baseball tournament
- 1993 NCAA Division III baseball tournament
- 1993 NAIA World Series
