= Willie Morales =

American baseball player (born 1972)

- Catcher
- Born: September 7, 1972 (age 53); Tucson, Arizona, U.S.
- Batted: Right Threw: Right

MLB debut
- April 9, 2000, for the Baltimore Orioles

Last MLB appearance
- September 6, 2000, for the Baltimore Orioles

MLB statistics
- Batting average: .273
- Home runs: 0
- Runs batted in: 0
- Stats at Baseball Reference

Teams
- Baltimore Orioles (2000)
Medals
Men's baseball
Representing United States
World Junior Baseball Championship
Bronze medal – third place	1990 Cuba	Team

William Anthony Morales (born September 7, 1972) is an American former Major League Baseball catcher who played for the Baltimore Orioles in 2000. He played for Tucson High School's state championship teams in 1987 and 1988. He was inducted into the Pima County Sports Hall of Fame in 2023.

Morales attended the University of Arizona, and in 1991 he played collegiate summer baseball with the Orleans Cardinals of the Cape Cod Baseball League. He was selected by the Oakland Athletics in the 14th round of the 1993 MLB draft.
