= Eck Stadium =

Baseball stadium in Wichita, Kansas, US

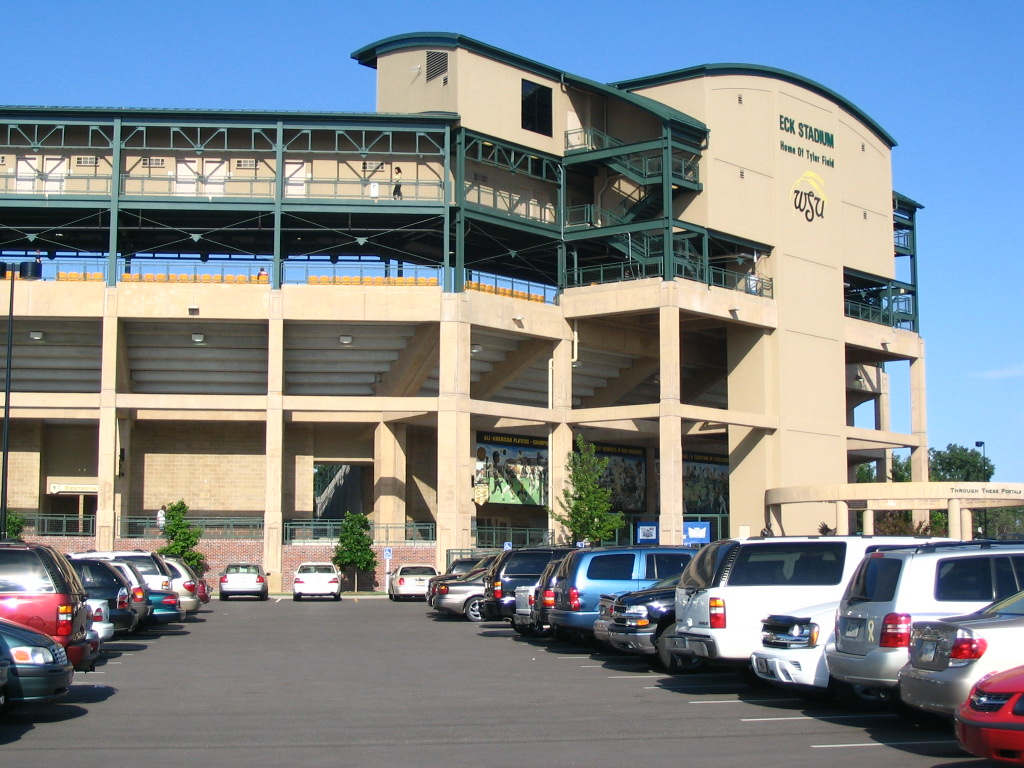
- Interactive map of Eck Stadium
- Location: Wichita, Kansas 67260 USA
- Coordinates: 37.721684°N 97.288431°W
- Owner: Wichita State University
- Operator: Wichita State University
- Capacity: 7,851
- Surface: Major Play artificial turf and pitching mound
- Field size: Left Field - 335'; Right field - 335'; Center Field - 390'

Construction
- Opened: 1985
- Renovated: 1988, 1992, 1995, 2016, 2019
- Cost: $700,000 (original facility) $7.8 million (1999 Renovation)
- Architect: Schaefer, Johnson, Cox, Frey & Associates PA

Tenants
- Wichita State Shockers (NCAA, AAC) (1985–present); NCAA Regional: 1990, 1991, 1992, 1994, 1995, 1996, 1998, 2002, 2007

Eck Stadium is a baseball stadium in Wichita, Kansas, United States. It is located on the south side of 21st Street between Hillside and Oliver on the campus of Wichita State University in northeast Wichita.

The stadium is home of the Wichita State Shockers baseball team. It has played host to the Shockers in rudimentary form since 1978, and as a complete stadium since 1985. Officially called Eck Stadium, Home of Tyler Field at Gene Stephenson Park it is sometimes informally referred to as Eck.

The stadium, which has gone through numerous upgrades since its original completion, currently seats 7,851. This number does not include the Coleman Outfield Hill which can seat hundreds more.

== History ==
When Gene Stephenson revived the Shocker baseball program in 1978, the team played most of the season at the city-owned McAdams Field. With six games left in the season, the team moved to its first on-campus facility, Shocker Field. It was a bare-bones facility built on a former golf practice course, with little more than an AstroTurf field, a chain-link fence and a scoreboard. Limited seating was installed in 1979. The first semi-permanent seating was a 322-seat bleacher section installed in 1981.

In 1985, building on the momentum from the Shockers advancing all the way to the national championship game in 1982, Wichita State built a permanent 3,044-seat stadium at a cost of $700,000. It was named Eck Stadium after Wichita car dealer Rusty Eck, an early supporter of the baseball program.

The stadium's first major renovation came in 1988, with the addition of a new AstroTurf surface, a rubberized warning track and 292 box seats behind the plate. The playing surface was renamed Tyler Field after Ron and Linda Tyler, who funded most of the $425,000 project. A year later, the Shockers won the only team national title by a Shocker team in any sport to date.

On September 23, 1999, The Coleman Co. put a $500,000 exclamation point on Wichita State University's Project FutureShox, a $7.8 million effort to make Eck Stadium-Home of Tyler Field the premier collegiate baseball facility in the nation. Plans to significantly upgrade Eck Stadium were first announced on January 28, 1998, and were taken to another level with the leadership of Gene Stephenson, the winningest collegiate baseball coach since 1978.

Several major contributors stepped forward on the front end of the project, and on September 23, The Coleman Co. accentuated a project that had Wichita State on its way to having the best collegiate baseball facility in the country.

Before the start of the 2020 season, a new facility was constructed adjacent to the Bombardier Learjet Indoor Practice Facility. The new facility features a 2,500 square-foot weight room for both the baseball and softball teams, and a new Wichita State baseball locker room, athletic training room, laundry facility and meeting/video room. The new area also includes coaches offices, a professional-sized dugout for the Shockers, a pedestrian plaza and a new ticket office.

== Seating sections ==
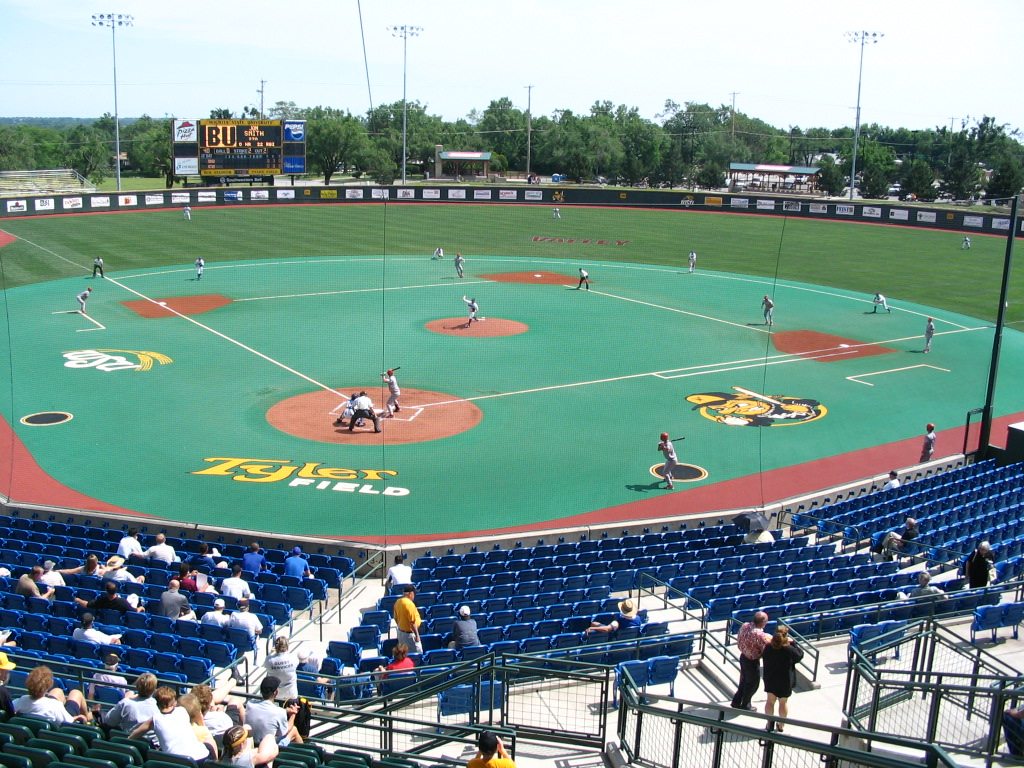
Tyler Field in Eck Stadium (2005)

=== Virginia H. Farah All-American Club ===
The Virginia H. Farah All-American Club accommodates nearly 200 fans, and features reserved box seats for up to 96 fans on a veranda level immediately in front of the club.

Membership in the Virginia H. Farah All-American Club includes access to viewing from the box, complimentary food and beverage each game, priority parking and club admission for two fans per membership.

=== Coleman Hill ===
The Coleman Hill includes two pavilions and terraces that spruce up the hill. The pavilions feature two covered, split-level, hardwood decks with storage for chairs. One pavilion includes a fireplace. The pavilions provide general seating for groups of fans and may be reserved for special events.

The improvements complement the grass seating areas that remain beyond the outfield fence, which include the addition of rock terracing.

=== Regular seating ===
The official seating capacity of Eck Stadium is 7,851. This number counts the chairback seats behind home plate, as well as the chairback seats that line the right field line, and the metal grandstands that reside down the right field line as well. Blue "box seats" are closest to the action behind home plate. Followed by green and yellow seats higher up behind them, they are separated by stairs and a walkway.

== Playing surface ==
Prior to the start of the 2020 season, Major Play artificial turf, a new, state-of-the-art playing surface, was installed by Austin, Texas, based Hellas Construction, the same company that manages artificial surfaces at AT&T Stadium, home of the NFL's Dallas Cowboys, and NRG Stadium, home of the NFL's Houston Texans. In addition a new artificial pitching mound was installed, replacing the old, natural dirt mound, as well as a new outfield wall. The new surface replaced the old AstroTurf surface that had been at Eck Stadium since the 2010 season.

Through the 2009 season, the infield consisted of field turf with dirt pockets surrounding each base, the pitchers mound, and home plate. The grass was real and stayed constantly green and long. Eck was known for its long outfield grass as batters struggled to get doubles, with the grass slowing down balls hit in the right or left field gaps.

The dimensions are 335 feet down both left and right field lines and 390 to center. Winds often blow from right field to left aiding right-handed batters trying to hit home runs.

Both bullpens are located down the foul lines on the respective 1st and 3rd baselines. The third base lines bullpen also contains batting cages WSU uses for practice.

== See also ==
- List of NCAA Division I baseball venues

Sports facilities on WSU campus

- Cessna Stadium (track)
- Charles Koch Arena (basketball and volleyball)

Sports facilities in Wichita

- Lawrence–Dumont Stadium (baseball, demolished 2018, downtown Wichita)
- Riverfront Stadium (baseball, opened 2021, downtown Wichita)
