= Brett Laxton =

American baseball player (born 1973)

- Pitcher
- Born: October 5, 1973 (age 51); Stratford, New Jersey, U.S.
- Batted: Left Threw: Right

MLB debut
- June 21, 1999, for the Oakland Athletics

Last MLB appearance
- July 13, 2000, for the Kansas City Royals

MLB statistics
- Win–loss record: 0–2
- Earned run average: 7.86
- Strikeouts: 23
- Stats at Baseball Reference

Teams
- Oakland Athletics (1999); Kansas City Royals (2000)

Brett William Laxton (born October 5, 1973) is an American former professional baseball pitcher who played in parts of two seasons for the Oakland Athletics and the Kansas City Royals of Major League Baseball (MLB). He is the son of former major leaguer Bill Laxton.

== Playing career ==
Laxton attended Audubon High School in Audubon, New Jersey, graduating in 1992. He was part of the World Series-winning American Legion team from the year before. Laxton was drafted by the San Diego Padres in the fourth round, but decided to attend Louisiana State University for four years. He was part of the 1993 and 1996 championship LSU Tigers baseball teams, and as a freshman set a championship-game record for strikeouts in 1993 with 16. In 1994, he played collegiate summer baseball with the Cotuit Kettleers of the Cape Cod Baseball League, and returned to the league in 1996 to play for the Hyannis Mets.

Laxton was drafted by the Oakland Athletics in the 24th round in 1996. He was called up to the majors for the first time on June 18, 1999. Laxton appeared in three games for the A's as a reliever during the 1999 season and six games for the Kansas City Royals during the 2000 season.

== Post-playing career ==
Laxton currently works for baseball bat manufacturer Marucci Sports in Baton Rouge as a Master Bat Craftsman.

== See also ==
- List of second-generation Major League Baseball players
