= 1994 College Baseball All-America Team =

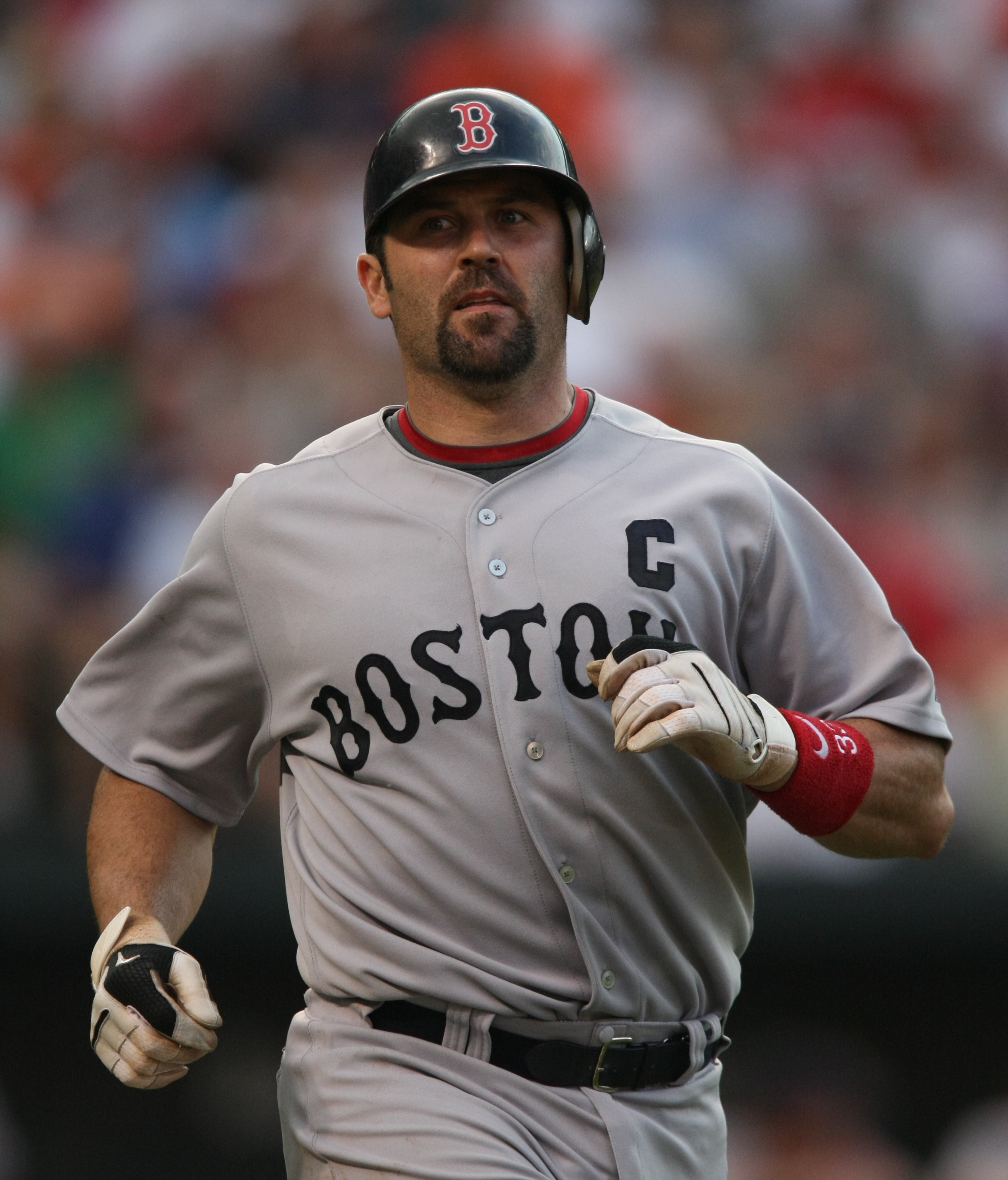
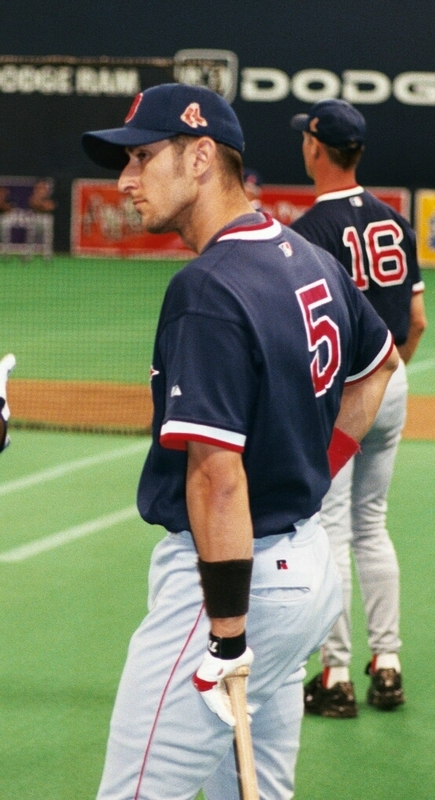
The team includes Jason Varitek (left), who has caught a Major League Baseball record four no-hitters, and Nomar Garciaparra (right), who was an American League Rookie of the Year, two-time batting champion and six-time All-Star.

This is a list of college baseball players named first team All-Americans for the 1994 NCAA Division I baseball season. From 1994 to 1996, there were four generally recognized All-America selectors for baseball: the American Baseball Coaches Association, Baseball America, Collegiate Baseball Newspaper, and the National Collegiate Baseball Writers Association. In order to be considered a "consensus" All-American, a player must have been selected by at least three of these.

== Key ==
| A | American Baseball Coaches Association |
| B | Baseball America |
| C | Collegiate Baseball Newspaper |
| N | National Collegiate Baseball Writers Association – branded as the Smith Super Team |
| | Member of the National College Baseball Hall of Fame |
| | Consensus All-American – selected by all four organizations |
| | Consensus All-American – selected by three organizations |

== All-Americans ==
| Position | Name | School | # | A | B | C | N | Other awards and honors |
|---|---|---|---|---|---|---|---|---|
| Starting pitcher | Matt Beaumont | Ohio State | 2 | — | — | ✓ | ✓ | |
| Starting pitcher | Jason Bell | Oklahoma State | 2 | — | ✓ | — | ✓ | |
| Starting pitcher | R. A. Dickey | Tennessee | 3 | — | ✓ | ✓ | ✓ | |
| Starting pitcher | Ryan Nye | Texas Tech | 1 | — | — | — | ✓ | |
| Starting pitcher | Noah Perry | Arizona State | 1 | — | — | — | ✓ | |
| Starting pitcher | Gary Rath | Mississippi State | 2 | ✓ | ✓ | — | — | |
| Starting pitcher | Brad Rigby | Georgia Tech | 1 | — | — | — | ✓ | |
| Starting pitcher | Scott Rivette | Long Beach State | 2 | ✓ | — | ✓ | — | |
| Starting pitcher | Paul Wilson | Florida State | 3 | ✓ | ✓ | — | ✓ | First overall pick in the 1994 MLB draft |
| Starting pitcher | Matt Wagner | Cal State Fullerton | 1 | — | — | — | ✓ | |
| Relief pitcher | Shane Dennis | Wichita State | 2 | ✓ | — | ✓ | — | |
| Relief pitcher | Danny Graves | Miami (FL) | 4 | ✓ | ✓ | ✓ | ✓ | |
| Relief pitcher | Brett Merrick | Washington | 1 | — | — | ✓ | — | |
| Catcher | A. J. Hinch | Stanford | 1 | — | — | — | ✓ | |
| Catcher | Jason Varitek | Georgia Tech | 4 | ✓ | ✓ | ✓ | ✓ | Dick Howser Trophy Golden Spikes Award ABCA Player of the Year Baseball America Player of the Year Rotary Smith Award |
| First baseman | Tommy Davis | Southern Miss | 4 | ✓ | ✓ | ✓ | ✓ | |
| First baseman | Jay Waggoner | Auburn | 1 | — | — | — | ✓ | |
| Second baseman | Rick Guiterrez | Oklahoma | 1 | — | — | — | ✓ | |
| Second baseman | Luiz Hernandez | Miami (FL) | 1 | — | — | — | ✓ | |
| Second baseman | Mark Merila | Minnesota | 1 | — | — | — | ✓ | |
| Second baseman | Todd Walker | LSU | 4 | ✓ | ✓ | ✓ | ✓ | |
| Shortstop | Gabe Alvarez | USC | 1 | — | — | — | ✓ | |
| Shortstop | Nomar Garciaparra | Georgia Tech | 4 | ✓ | ✓ | ✓ | ✓ | |
| Shortstop | Russ Johnson | LSU | 1 | — | — | — | ✓ | |
| Third baseman | Mike Hampton | Clemson | 2 | — | — | ✓ | ✓ | |
| Third baseman | Antone Williamson | Arizona State | 2 | — | ✓ | — | ✓ | |
| Third baseman | Kevin Young | Central Michigan | 1 | ✓ | — | — | — | |
| Outfielder | Jeff Abbott | Kentucky | 2 | — | — | ✓ | ✓ | |
| Outfielder | Jacob Cruz | Arizona State | 1 | — | — | — | ✓ | |
| Outfielder | José Cruz Jr. | Rice | 3 | ✓ | ✓ | — | ✓ | |
| Outfielder | Mark Little | Memphis State | 3 | ✓ | — | ✓ | ✓ | |
| Outfielder | Shane Monahan | Clemson | 3 | ✓ | ✓ | — | ✓ | |
| Outfielder | Jay Payton | Georgia Tech | 4 | ✓ | ✓ | ✓ | ✓ | |
| Designated hitter | Brian Buchanan | Virginia | 1 | — | ✓ | — | — | |
| Designated hitter | Ryan Hall | BYU | 3 | ✓ | — | ✓ | ✓ | |
| Utility player | Todd Helton | Tennessee | 1 | — | — | — | ✓ | |
| Utility player | Ryan Jackson | Duke | 1 | — | — | ✓ | — | Collegiate Baseball Player of the Year |

== See also ==
- List of college baseball awards
