= 1994 NCAA Division I baseball tournament =

- Season: 1994
- Teams: 48
- Finals site: Johnny Rosenblatt Stadium; Omaha, NE
- Champions: Oklahoma (2nd title)
- Runner-up: Georgia Tech (1st CWS Appearance)
- Winning coach: Larry Cochell (1st title)
- MOP: Chip Glass (Oklahoma)

The 1994 NCAA Division I baseball tournament was played at the end of the 1994 NCAA Division I baseball season to determine the national champion of college baseball. The tournament concluded with eight teams competing in the College World Series, a double-elimination tournament in its forty eighth year. Eight regional competitions were held to determine the participants in the final event. Each region was composed of six teams, resulting in 48 teams participating in the tournament at the conclusion of their regular season, and in some cases, after a conference tournament. The forty-eighth tournament's champion was Oklahoma, coached by Larry Cochell. The Most Outstanding Player was Chip Glass of Oklahoma.

== Regionals ==
The opening rounds of the tournament were played across eight regional sites across the country, each consisting of a six-team field. Each regional tournament is double-elimination. The winners of each regional advanced to the College World Series.

Bold indicates winner.

=== Atlantic I Regional at Coral Gables, FL ===
First round
1	**Miami (FL)**	**17**
6	Rider	4
2	**Florida**	**8**
5	West Virginia	7
3	Kent State	6
4	**Minnesota**	11

Second round
1	**Miami (FL)**	**4**
3	Kent State	1
2	Florida	2
4	**Minnesota**	**12**
6	Rider	7
5	**West Virginia**	**19**

Third round
1	**Miami (FL)**	**11**
4	Minnesota	3
2	**Florida**	**12**
5	West Virginia	8

Semifinals
4	Minnesota	1
2	**Florida**	**4**

Final
1	**Miami (FL)**	**10**	—
2	Florida	6	—

=== Atlantic II Regional at Tallahassee, FL ===
First round
1	**Ohio State**	**6**
6	BYU	1
2	**Florida State**	**8**
5	Central Michigan	6
3	Kansas	2
4	**Jacksonville**	**7**

Second round
1	Ohio State	6
3	**Kansas**	**20**
6	**BYU**	**8**
5	Central Michigan	6
2	**Florida State**	**5**
4	Jacksonville	1
1	Ohio State	5
4	**Jacksonville**	**6**

Third round
3	Kansas	3
6	**BYU**	**8**
2	**Florida State**	**5**
4	Jacksonville	1

Final
6	BYU	1	—
2	**Florida State**	**7**	—

=== Central Regional at Austin, TX ===
First round
1	**Oklahoma**	**10**
6	Arkansas State	3
2	**Nevada**	**11**
5	UTSA	8
3	**Texas**	**8**
4	Stanford	4

Second round
1	**Oklahoma**	**10**
4	Stanford	4
2	Nevada	6
3	**Texas**	**16**
6	**Arkansas State**	**10**
5	UTSA	5

Third round
1	**Oklahoma**	**15**
3	Texas	4
2	Nevada	2
6	**Arkansas State**	**4**

Semifinals
3	**Texas**	**9**
6	Arkansas State	4

Final
1	**Oklahoma**	**6**	—
3	Texas	3	—

=== East Regional at Clemson, SC ===
First round
1	**Clemson**	**5**
6	The Citadel	1
2	**Auburn**	**7**
5	Virginia Tech	0
3	**Old Dominion**	**9**
4	Notre Dame	5

Second round
1	Clemson	1
4	**Notre Dame**	**8**
6	**The Citadel**	**4**
5	Virginia Tech	3
2	**Auburn**	**11**^{10}
3	Old Dominion	8
1	**Clemson**	**6**
3	Old Dominion	1

Third round
4	**Notre Dame**	**5**
6	The Citadel	1
2	**Auburn**	**11**
1	Clemson	5

Final
4	Notre Dame	0	—
2	**Auburn**	**8**	—

=== Mideast Regional at Knoxville, TN ===
First round
1	**Tennessee**	**9**
6	Northeastern	6
2	NC State	12
5	**Wright State**	**14**
3	**Arizona State**	**8**
4	Western Carolina	6

Second round
1	**Tennessee**	**6**
4	Western Carolina	4
5	Wright State	4
3	**Arizona State**	**7**
6	Northeastern	2
2	**North Carolina State**	**5**

Third round
1	Tennessee	5
3	**Arizona State**	**10**
5	Wright State	6
2	**North Carolina State**	**10**

Semifinals
1	**Tennessee**	**15**
2	North Carolina State	4

Final
3	**Arizona State**	**5**^{10}	—
1	Tennessee	4	—

=== Midwest I Regional at Stillwater, OK ===
First round
1	**Oklahoma State**	**8**
6	Illinois State	2
2	**Cal State Fullerton**	**11**
5	Northwestern State	3
3	**TCU**	**11**
4	Memphis	3

Second round
1	Oklahoma State	4
4	**Memphis**	**12**
6	Illinois State	2
5	**Northwestern State**	**8**
2	**Cal State Fullerton**	**4**
3	TCU	1
1	**Oklahoma State**	**10**
3	TCU	8

Third round
4	**Memphis**	**14**
5	Northwestern State	9
2	Cal State Fullerton	11
1	**Oklahoma State**	**13**

Semifinals
4	Memphis	5
2	**Cal State Fullerton**	**12**

Final
2	**Cal State Fullerton**	**6**^{10}
1	Oklahoma State	5

=== Midwest II Regional at Wichita, KS ===
First round
1	**Georgia Tech**	**7**
6	Connecticut	0
2	Long Beach State	4
5	**Washington**	**10**
3	Wichita State	1
4	**Santa Clara**	**2**

Second round
1	**Georgia Tech**	**13**
3	Wichita State	1
5	**Washington**	**11**
4	Santa Clara	5
6	Connecticut	9
2	**Long Beach State**	**16**

Third round
1	**Georgia Tech**	**6**
5	Washington	2
4	Santa Clara	3
2	**Long Beach State**	**6**

Semifinals
5	**Washington**	**6**
2	Long Beach State	2

Final
1	**Georgia Tech**	9	**18**
5	Washington	**12**^{14}	7

=== South Regional at Baton Rouge, LA ===
First round
1	**LSU**	**10**
6	SE Louisiana	6
2	**Southern California**	**19**
5	UNC Greensboro	3
3	**Tulane**	**7**
4	Fresno State	5

Second round
1	**LSU**	**6**
4	Fresno State	2
2	**Southern California**	**5**
3	Tulane	0
6	SE Louisiana	12
5	**UNC Greensboro**	**22**

Third round
1	**LSU**	**6**
2	Southern California	2
3	Tulane	1
5	**UNC Greensboro**	**4**

Semifinals
2	**Southern California**	**25**
5	UNC Greensboro	9

Final
1	**LSU**	**12**	—
2	Southern California	10	—

== College World Series ==
=== Participants ===
Seeding	School	Conference	Record (conference)	Head coach	CWS appearances	CWS best finish	CWS record
1	Miami (FL)	n/a	48–12 (n/a)	Jim Morris	12 (last: 1992)	1st (1982, 1985)	26–21
2	Georgia Tech	ACC	47–16 (16–8)	Danny Hall	0 (last: none)	none	0–0
3	LSU	SEC	46–18 (21–6)	Skip Bertman	6 (last: 1993)	1st (1991, 1993)	15–9
4	Oklahoma	Big 8	46–17 (21–9)	Larry Cochell	7 (last: 1992)	1st (1951)	10–12
5	Auburn	SEC	44–19 (16–13)	Hal Baird	2 (last: 1976)	4th (1967)	2–4
6	Florida State	ACC	52–20 (14–9)	Mike Martin	12 (last: 1992)	2nd (1970, 1986)	16–24
7	Cal State Fullerton	Big West	45–14 (15–5)	Augie Garrido	7 (last: 1992)	1st (1979, 1984)	16–12
8	Arizona State	Pac-10	43–16 (20–10)	Jim Brock	16 (last: 1993)	1st (1965, 1967, 1969, 1977, 1981)	50–27

=== Results ===
==== Bracket ====
The teams in the CWS are divided into two pools of four, with each pool playing a double-elimination format. The winners of the two pools meet in the National Championship game.

First round
2	Georgia Tech	2
7	Cal State Fullerton	0
6	Florida State	6
3	LSU	3
7	Cal State Fullerton	20
3	LSU	6
8	Arizona State	4
1	Miami (FL)	0
4	Oklahoma	5
5	Auburn	4
1	Miami (FL)	7
5	Auburn	5

Second round
2	Georgia Tech	12^{10}
6	Florida State	4
7	Cal State Fullerton	10
6	Florida State	3
8	Arizona State	3
4	Oklahoma	4^{11}
1	Miami (FL)	5
8	Arizona State	9

Semifinals
2	Georgia Tech	3^{12}	—
7	Cal State Fullerton	2	—
4	Oklahoma	6	—
8	Arizona State	1	—

Finals
2	Georgia Tech	5
4	Oklahoma	13

==== Game results ====
Date	Game	Winner	Score	Loser	Notes
June 3	Game 1	Georgia Tech	2–0	Cal State Fullerton	
June 3	Game 2	Florida State	6–3	LSU	
June 4	Game 3	Arizona State	4–0	Miami (FL)	
June 4	Game 4	Oklahoma	5–4	Auburn	
June 5	Game 5	Georgia Tech	12–4 (10 innings)	Florida State	
June 5	Game 6	Cal State Fullerton	20–6	LSU	LSU eliminated
June 6	Game 7	Miami (FL)	7–5	Auburn	Auburn eliminated
June 6	Game 8	Oklahoma	4–3 (11 innings)	Arizona State	
June 7	Game 9	Cal State Fullerton	10–3	Florida State	Florida State eliminated
June 7	Game 10	Arizona State	9–5	Miami (FL)	Miami (FL) eliminated
June 8	Game 11	Georgia Tech	3–2 (12 innings)	Cal State Fullerton	Cal State Fullerton eliminated
June 9	Game 12	Oklahoma	6–1	Arizona State	Arizona State eliminated
June 11	Final	Oklahoma	13–5	Georgia Tech	Oklahoma wins CWS

== All-Tournament Team ==
The following players were members of the College World Series All-Tournament Team.

Position	Player	School
P	Mark Redman	Oklahoma
P	Brad Rigby	Georgia Tech
C	Jason Varitek	Georgia Tech
1B	Ryan Minor	Oklahoma
2B	Rick Gutierrez	Oklahoma
3B	Antone Williamson	Arizona State
SS	Nomar Garciaparra	Georgia Tech
OF	Chip Glass (MOP)	Oklahoma
OF	Mark Kotsay	Cal State Fullerton
OF	Darvin Traylor	Oklahoma
DH	Todd Walker	LSU

=== Notable players ===
- Arizona State: Jacob Cruz, Cody McKay, Antone Williamson
- Auburn: Mark Bellhorn
- Cal State Fullerton: Jeremy Giambi, Bret Hemphill, Mark Kotsay, Dante Powell
- Florida State: Jonathan Johnson, Doug Mientkiewicz, Paul Wilson, Steven Morgan
- Georgia Tech: Nomar Garciaparra, Jay Payton, Brad Rigby, Jason Varitek
- LSU: Russ Johnson, Brett Laxton, Warren Morris, Todd Walker, Ed Yarnall
- Miami (FL): Alex Cora, Danny Graves, Mike Metcalfe, Jay Tessmer
- Oklahoma: Steve Connelly, Damon Minor, Ryan Minor, Russ Ortiz, Mark Redman

== See also ==
- 1994 NCAA Division I softball tournament
- 1994 NCAA Division II baseball tournament
- 1994 NCAA Division III baseball tournament
- 1994 NAIA World Series
