= 1994 Oklahoma Sooners baseball team =

American college baseball season

1994 Oklahoma Sooners baseball

College World Series National Champions NCAA Central Regional Champions
- Conference: Big 8 Conference
- Record: 50-17 (21-9 Big 8)
- Head coach: Larry Cochell (4th year)
- Home stadium: L. Dale Mitchell Baseball Park

1994 Big Eight Conference baseball standings
	Conf.				Overall
Team	W		L	PCT	W		L	PCT
No. 12 Oklahoma State ‍†‍‡‍^{y}	21	–	6	.778	49	–	17	.742
No. 1 Oklahoma ‍‍‍^{y}	21	–	9	.700	50	–	17	.746
No. 25 Kansas ‍‍‍^{y}	17	–	9	.654	40	–	18	.690
Iowa State ‍‍‍	15	–	14	.517	30	–	28	.517
Nebraska ‍‍‍	14	–	16	.467	32	–	28	.533
Missouri ‍‍‍	9	–	19	.321	32	–	26	.552
Kansas State ‍‍‍	3	–	27	.100	13	–	43	.232
† – Conference champion ‡ – Tournament champion y – Invited to the NCAA tournament As of June 30, 1994; Rankings from Collegiate Baseball

The 1994 Oklahoma Sooners baseball team represented the University of Oklahoma in the 1994 NCAA Division I baseball season. The Sooners played their home games at L. Dale Mitchell Baseball Park. The team was coached by Larry Cochell in his 4th season at Oklahoma.

The Sooners won the College World Series, defeating the Georgia Tech Yellow Jackets in the championship game.

== Roster ==
1994 Oklahoma Sooners Roster
Pitchers: Bucky Buckles; Steve Connelly; Kenny Gajewski; Derek Glascoe; Eric Linn; Kevin Lovingier; Russ Ortiz; Mark Redman; Shawn Snyder; John Steele; Joe Victery; Tim Walton	Infielders: Chris Bradshaw; Rick Gutierrez; Rich Hills; M.J. Mariani; Ryan Minor; Mark Soto; Duane Stelly; Catchers: Chris Briones; Javier Flores	Outfielders: Chip Glass; Dustin Hansen; Damon Minor; Mick Meunier; Aric Thomas; Darvin Traylor; Jerry Whittaker

== Schedule ==
1994 Oklahoma Sooners baseball game log
Regular season
February (7–1)

Date	Opponent	Site/stadium	Score	Overall record	Big 8
February 5	Missouri Southern	L. Dale Mitchell Baseball Park	14-0	1-0	–
February 6	Missouri Southern	L. Dale Mitchell Baseball Park	9-1	2-0	–
February 20	Oklahoma City	L. Dale Mitchell Baseball Park	9-4	3-0	–
February 20	Oklahoma City	L. Dale Mitchell Baseball Park	14-1	4-0	–
February 22	at TCU	TCU Diamond	12-11	5-0	–
February 25	vs. Georgia Tech	Goodwin Field	8-6	6-0	–
February 26	at Cal State Fullerton	Goodwin Field	1-4	6-1	–
February 27	vs. San Diego	Goodwin Field	10-9	7-1	–

March (13–7)

Date	Opponent	Site/stadium	Score	Overall record	Big 8
March 4	at Texas	Disch-Falk Field	5-4	8-1	–
March 5	at Texas	Disch-Falk Field	4-6	8-2	–
March 7	vs. Sam Houston State	Cougar Field	13-7	9-2	–
March 7	at Houston	Cougar Field	7-3	10-2	–
March 8	vs. Creighton	Cougar Field	8-0	11-2	–
March 9	at Houston	Cougar Field	3-8	11-3	–
March 11	Iowa State	L. Dale Mitchell Ballpark	6-1	12-3	1-0
March 12	Iowa State	L. Dale Mitchell Ballpark	9-3	13-3	2-0
March 13	Mississippi	L. Dale Mitchell Ballpark	6-5	14-3	–
March 14	Mississippi	L. Dale Mitchell Ballpark	9-13	14-4	–
March 16	Emporia State	L. Dale Mitchell Ballpark	12-3	15-4	–
March 19	Kansas	L. Dale Mitchell Ballpark	4-14	15-5	2-1
March 20	Kansas	L. Dale Mitchell Ballpark	7-9	15-6	2-2
March 22	South Alabama	L. Dale Mitchell Ballpark	12-11	16-6	–
March 23	South Alabama	L. Dale Mitchell Ballpark	14-7	17-6	–
March 25	at Kansas	Hoglund Ballpark	4-6	17-7	2-3
March 26	at Kansas	Hoglund Ballpark	1-2	17-8	2-4
March 27	at Kansas	Hoglund Ballpark	9-7	18-8	3-4
March 29	Kansas State	L. Dale Mitchell Ballpark	6-1	19-8	4-4
March 30	Kansas State	L. Dale Mitchell Ballpark	6-0	20-8	5-4

April (12–6)

Date	Opponent	Site/stadium	Score	Overall record	Big 8
April 1	Texas Tech	L. Dale Mitchell Ballpark	3-6	20-9	–
April 2	Texas Tech	L. Dale Mitchell Ballpark	10-8	21-9	–
April 4	TCU	L. Dale Mitchell Ballpark	8-7	22-9	–
April 6	Arkansas	L. Dale Mitchell Ballpark	11-2	23-9	–
April 9	at Iowa State	Cap Timm Field	8-6	24-9	6-4
April 9	at Iowa State	Cap Timm Field	8-6	25-9	7-4
April 10	at Iowa State	Cap Timm Field	12-3	26-9	8-4
April 13	at Missouri	Simmons Field	7-4	27-9	9-4
April 13	at Missouri	Simmons Field	5-4	28-9	10-4
April 15	vs. Oklahoma State	Drillers Stadium	3-4	28-10	10-5
April 16	vs. Oklahoma State	All Sports Stadium	4-11	28-11	10-6
April 17	vs. Oklahoma State	All Sports Stadium	8-2	29-11	11-6
April 19	Oklahoma State	L. Dale Mitchell Ballpark	4-2	30-11	12-6
April 20	at Oklahoma State	Allie P. Reynolds Stadium	5-10	30-12	12-7
April 22	at Kansas State	Tointon Family Stadium	7-3	31-12	13-7
April 23	at Kansas State	Tointon Family Stadium	14-16	31-13	13-8
April 24	at Kansas	Hoglund Ballpark	21-7	32-13	14-8
April 26	at Wichita State	L. Dale Mitchell Ballpark	1-4	32-14	–

May (7–1)

Date	Opponent	Site/stadium	Score	Overall record	Big 8
May 7	Nebraska	L. Dale Mitchell Ballpark	3-1	33-14	15-8
May 7	Nebraska	L. Dale Mitchell Ballpark	7-5	34-14	16-8
May 8	Nebraska	L. Dale Mitchell Ballpark	13-9	35-14	17-8
May 10	at Nebraska	Buck Belzer Stadium	6-7	35-15	17-9
May 11	at Nebraska	Buck Belzer Stadium	4-0	36-15	18-9
May 14	Missouri	L. Dale Mitchell Ballpark	7-6	37-15	19-9
May 15	Missouri	L. Dale Mitchell Ballpark	4-1	38-15	20-9
May 16	Missouri	L. Dale Mitchell Ballpark	7-6	39-15	21-9

Postseason
Big 8 Conference Tournament (3–2)

Date	Opponent	Site/stadium	Score	Overall record
June 19	vs. Nebraska	All Sports Stadium	2-3	39-16
June 20	vs. Missouri	All Sports Stadium	15-2	40-16
June 21	vs. Iowa State	All Sports Stadium	5-3	41-16
June 22	vs. Nebraska	All Sports Stadium	21-4	42-16
June 22	vs. Oklahoma State	All Sports Stadium	3-6	42-17

Central Regional (4–0)

Date	Opponent	Site/stadium	Score	Overall record
June 27	vs. Arkansas State	Disch-Falk Field	10-3	43-17
June 28	vs. Stanford	Disch-Falk Field	10-4	44-17
June 29	vs. Texas	Disch-Falk Field	15-4	45-17
June 30	vs. Texas	Disch-Falk Field	6-3	46-17

1994 College World Series (4–0)

Date	Opponent	Site/stadium	Score	Overall record
June 4	vs. Auburn	Rosenblatt Stadium	5-4	47-17
June 5	vs. Arizona State	Rosenblatt Stadium	4-3	48-17
June 9	vs. Arizona State	Rosenblatt Stadium	6-1	49-17
June 11	vs. Georgia Tech	Rosenblatt Stadium	13-5	50-17

== Awards and honors ==
Bucky Buckles

- All-Big Eight First Team
- Big Eight All-Tournament Team

Chip Glass

- Big Eight All-Tournament Team
- College World Series Most Outstanding Player

Rick Gutierrez

- All-America First Team
- Big Eight Player of the Year
- All-Big Eight First Team
- Big Eight All-Tournament Team
- College World Series All-Tournament Team

Rich Hills

- All-America Second Team
- All-Big Eight First Team
- Big Eight All-Tournament Team

Kevin Lovingier

- All-Big Eight First Team

M.J. Mariani

- Big Eight All-Tournament Team

Ryan Minor

- Big Eight All-Tournament Team
- College World Series All-Tournament Team

Mark Redman

- Big Eight Newcomer of the Year
- All-Big Eight First Team
- College World Series All-Tournament Team

Darvin Traylor

- All-Big Eight First Team
- College World Series All-Tournament Team

== Sooners in the 1994 MLB draft ==
The following members of the Oklahoma Sooners baseball program were drafted in the 1994 Major League Baseball draft.

Player	Position	Round	Overall	MLB team
Jerry Whittaker	OF	2nd	60th	Chicago White Sox
Bucky Buckles	RHP	7th	197th	Texas Rangers
Kevin Lovingier	LHP	25th	698th	St. Louis Cardinals
Ricky Gutierrez	2B	28th	773rd	Cleveland Indians
Chip Glass	OF	37th	1025th	Cleveland Indians
Rich Hills	SS	48th	1320th	Atlanta Braves
