= 1994 Cal State Fullerton Titans baseball team =

American college baseball season

1994 Cal State Fullerton Titans baseball

NCAA Midwest I Regional champions

College World Series, 2–2
- Conference: Big West Conference
- Record: 47–16 (15–5 Big West)
- Head coach: Augie Garrido (19th year)
- Home stadium: Goodwin Field

1994 Big West Conference baseball standings
	Conf.				Overall
Team	W		L	PCT	W		L	PCT
No. 20 Long Beach State ‍†‍‍^{y}	16	–	5	.762	41	–	19	.683
No. 19 Nevada ‍†‍‍^{y}	16	–	5	.762	41	–	15	.732
No. 3 Cal State Fullerton ‍‍‍^{y}	15	–	5	.750	47	–	16	.746
San Jose State ‍‍‍	9	–	12	.429	29	–	26	.527
Pacific ‍‍‍	8	–	12	.400	36	–	18	.667
UNLV ‍‍‍	8	–	13	.381	27	–	28	.491
UC Santa Barbara ‍‍‍	7	–	14	.333	21	–	33	.389
New Mexico State ‍‍‍	4	–	17	.190	21	–	31	.404
† – Conference champion y – Invited to the NCAA tournament As of June 30, 1994; Rankings from Collegiate Baseball

The 1994 Cal State Fullerton Titans baseball team represented California State University, Fullerton in the 1994 NCAA Division I baseball season. The Titans played their home games at Goodwin Field, and played as part of the Big West Conference. The team was coached by Augie Garrido in his nineteenth season overall as head coach at Cal State Fullerton.

The Titans reached the College World Series, their eighth appearance in Omaha, where they finished tied for third place after winning games against LSU and Florida State and losing two games to eventual runner-up Georgia Tech.

== Personnel ==
=== Roster ===
1994 Cal State Fullerton Titans roster
Pitchers: 5 - Derek Fahs - Junior; 12 - Ted Silva - Sophomore; 13 - Jon Ward - Sophomore; 15 - Dan Ricabal - Senior; 24 - Mike Parisi - Junior; 31 - Bobby Sunderland - Freshman; 37 - Kimson Hollibaugh - Senior; 39 - Tony Fetchel - Senior; 40 - Matt Wagner - Sophomore; 44 - Jose Peraza - Freshman	Catchers: 9 - Bret Hemphill - Senior; 19 - Brian Loyd - Freshman; 35 - Adam Millan - Senior; 38 - Ryan Jara - Junior; Outfielders: 1 - Brian King - Junior; 2 - Anthony Rice - Sophomore; 7 - Mark Kotsay - Freshman; 11 - Dante Powell - Junior; 20 - Robert Matos - Junior; 22 - Jim Betzsold - Senior; 26 - Jeremy Giambi - Freshman; 33 - Tony Miranda - Junior	Infielders: 3 - Jack Jones - Freshman; 4 - Chris Remala - Freshman; 6 - Jason Gill - Senior; 10 - Steve Rath - Senior; 17 - Sal Mancuso - Senior; 18 - Brett Thomas - Junior; 25 - Jeff Ferguson - Junior; 27 - Mike Lamb - Freshman; 34 - D.C. Olsen - Junior; 36 - Craig Skyberg - Senior

=== Coaches ===
1994 Cal State Fullerton Titans baseball coaching staff
- 16 - Augie Garrido - Head coach - 19th Season
- 8 - George Horton - Associate Head Coach - 4th Season
- 28 - Rick Vanderhook - Assistant coach - 8th Season
- - Joe Martelli - Volunteer assistant coach - 2nd Season

== Schedule and results ==
Legend
Cal State Fullerton win
Cal State Fullerton loss

1994 Cal State Fullerton Titans baseball game log
Regular season

January
Date	Opponent	Site/Stadium	Score	Overall Record	Big West Record
Jan 28	at No. 12 Stanford*	Sunken Diamond • Stanford, CA	W 12–2	1–0	
Jan 29	at No. 12 Stanford*	Sunken Diamond • Stanford, CA	L 6–7	1–1	
Jan 30	at No. 12 Stanford*	Sunken Diamond • Stanford, CA	W 8–7^{11}	2–1	

February
Date	Opponent	Site/Stadium	Score	Overall Record	Big West Record
Feb 1	UC Riverside*	Goodwin Field • Fullerton, CA	W 12–1	3–1	
Feb 5	Arizona*	Goodwin Field • Fullerton, CA	W 9–0	4–1	
Feb 5	Arizona*	Goodwin Field • Fullerton, CA	W 6–3	5–1	
Feb 6	Arizona*	Goodwin Field • Fullerton, CA	W 5–2	6–1	
Feb 8	at Loyola Marymount*	George C. Page Stadium • Los Angeles, CA	W 15–8	7–1	
Feb 11	at No. 9 Texas*	Disch–Falk Field • Austin, TX	W 5–0	8–1	
Feb 12	at No. 9 Texas*	Disch–Falk Field • Austin, TX	W 11–6	9–1	
Feb 13	at No. 9 Texas*	Disch–Falk Field • Austin, TX	W 18–14	10–1	
Feb 19	at Cal State Northridge*	Matador Field • Northridge, CA	W 1–0	11–1	
Feb 21	Cal State Northridge*	Goodwin Field • Fullerton, CA	W 10–5	12–1	
Feb 22	at UC Riverside*	Riverside Sports Complex • Riverside, CA	L 6–7	12–2	
Feb 25	San Diego*	Goodwin Field • Fullerton, CA (Anaheim Hilton & Towers Classic)	W 6–4	13–2	
Feb 26	Oklahoma*	Goodwin Field • Fullerton, CA (Anaheim Hilton & Towers Classic)	W 4–1	14–2	
Feb 27	No. 1 Georgia Tech*	Goodwin Field • Fullerton, CA (Anaheim Hilton & Towers Classic)	W 2–0	15–2	

March
Date	Opponent	Site/Stadium	Score	Overall Record	Big West Record
Mar 2	at Fresno State*	Pete Beiden Field • Fresno, CA	L 2–5	15–3	
Mar 9	at Pepperdine*	Eddy D. Field Stadium • Malibu, CA	L 2–3	15–4	
Mar 11	Grand Canyon*	Goodwin Field • Fullerton, CA	W 6–2	16–4	
Mar 12	Grand Canyon*	Goodwin Field • Fullerton, CA	W 13–2	17–4	
Mar 13	Grand Canyon*	Goodwin Field • Fullerton, CA	W 12–6	18–4	
Mar 16	Pepperdine*	Goodwin Field • Fullerton, CA	L 1–2	18–5	
Mar 18	at UCLA*	Jackie Robinson Stadium • Los Angeles, CA	W 13–3	19–5	
Mar 22	No. 6 Wichita State*	Goodwin Field • Fullerton, CA	W 3–2	20–5	
Mar 23	No. 6 Wichita State*	Goodwin Field • Fullerton, CA	W 5–4^{13}	21–5	
Mar 25	at San Jose State	San Jose Municipal Stadium • San Jose, CA	W 7–3^{10}	22–5	1–0
Mar 26	at San Jose State	San Jose Municipal Stadium • San Jose, CA	W 8–5	23–5	2–0
Mar 27	at San Jose State	San Jose Municipal Stadium • San Jose, CA	W 6–3	24–5	3–0

April
Date	Opponent	Site/Stadium	Score	Overall Record	Big West Record
Apr 2	UC Santa Barbara	Goodwin Field • Fullerton, CA	W 11–0	25–5	4–0
Apr 2	UC Santa Barbara	Goodwin Field • Fullerton, CA	L 2–4	25–6	4–1
Apr 3	UC Santa Barbara	Goodwin Field • Fullerton, CA	W 9–4	26–6	5–1
Apr 8	at No. 15 Long Beach State	Blair Field • Long Beach, CA	W 9–1	27–6	6–1
Apr 9	at No. 15 Long Beach State	Blair Field • Long Beach, CA	L 2–10	27–7	6–2
Apr 10	at No. 15 Long Beach State	Blair Field • Long Beach, CA	L 2–4	27–8	6–3
Apr 12	Loyola Marymount*	Goodwin Field • Fullerton, CA	W 7–5	28–8	
Apr 15	UNLV	Goodwin Field • Fullerton, CA	W 16–1	29–8	7–3
Apr 16	UNLV	Goodwin Field • Fullerton, CA	W 20–1	30–8	8–3
Apr 17	UNLV	Goodwin Field • Fullerton, CA	W 3–0	31–8	9–3
Apr 20	UCLA	Goodwin Field • Fullerton, CA	W 8–6	32–8	
Apr 22	at Pacific	Billy Hebert Field • Stockton, CA	W 4–0	33–8	10–3
Apr 23	at Pacific	Billy Hebert Field • Stockton, CA	W 4–1	34–8	11–3
Apr 29	No. 15 Nevada	Goodwin Field • Fullerton, CA	L 2–5	34–9	11–4
Apr 30	No. 15 Nevada	Goodwin Field • Fullerton, CA	L 2–7	34–10	11–5

May
Date	Opponent	Site/Stadium	Score	Overall Record	Big West Record
May 1	No. 15 Nevada	Goodwin Field • Fullerton, CA	W 8–0	35–10	12–5
May 4	Cal State Northridge*	Goodwin Field • Fullerton, CA	W 13–1	36–10	
May 6	at New Mexico State	Presley Askew Field • Las Cruces, NM	W 15–11	37–10	13–5
May 7	at New Mexico State	Presley Askew Field • Las Cruces, NM	W 23–10	38–10	14–5
May 8	at New Mexico State	Presley Askew Field • Las Cruces, NM	W 15–5	39–10	15–5
May 10	Fresno State*	Goodwin Field • Fullerton, CA	L 6–12	39–11	
May 11	UCLA*	Goodwin Field • Fullerton, CA	W 10–2	40–11	
May 13	at No. 6 USC*	Dedeaux Field • Los Angeles, CA	L 3–4	40–12	
May 14	No 6 USC*	Goodwin Field • Fullerton, CA	W 11–3	41–12	
May 15	at No. 6 USC*	Dedeaux Field • Los Angeles, CA	L 1–4	41–13	

Postseason

NCAA Midwest I Regional
Date	Opponent	Seed	Site/Stadium	Score	Overall Record	Reg Record
May 25	(5) Northwestern State	(2)	Allie P. Reynolds Stadium • Stillwater, OK	W 11–3	42–13	1–0
May 26	No. 20 (3) TCU	(2)	Allie P. Reynolds Stadium • Stillwater, OK	W 4–1	43–13	2–0
	No. 3 (1) Oklahoma State	(2)	Allie P. Reynolds Stadium • Stillwater, OK	L 11–13	43–14	2–1
May 27	No. 24 (4) Memphis	(2)	Allie P. Reynolds Stadium • Stillwater, OK	W 12–5	44–14	3–1
May 28	No. 3 (1) Oklahoma State	(2)	Allie P. Reynolds Stadium • Stillwater, OK	W 6–5^{10}	45–14	4–1

College World Series
Date	Opponent	Seed	Site/Stadium	Score	Overall Record	CWS Record
June 3	No. 1 (2) Georgia Tech	(7)	Johnny Rosenblatt Stadium • Omaha, NE	L 0–2	45–15	0–1
June 5	No. 9 (3) LSU	(7)	Johnny Rosenblatt Stadium • Omaha, NE	W 20–6	46–15	1–1
June 7	No. 5 (6) Florida State	(7)	Johnny Rosenblatt Stadium • Omaha, NE	W 10–3	47–15	2–1
June 8	No. 1 (2) Georgia Tech	(7)	Johnny Rosenblatt Stadium • Omaha, NE	L 2–3^{12}	47–16	2–2
