= 1994 Georgia Tech Yellow Jackets baseball team =

American college baseball season

1994 Georgia Tech Yellow Jackets baseball

Midwest II Regional Champions

College World Series, Runner-Up
- Conference: Atlantic Coast Conference
- Record: 50–17 (16–8 ACC)
- Head coach: Danny Hall (1st season)
- Assistant coaches: Rick Hatcher (1st season); Paul Mears (3rd season); Jeff Guy (1st season)
- MVP: Nomar Garciaparra
- Home stadium: Russ Chandler Stadium

1994 Atlantic Coast Conference baseball standings
	Conf.				Overall
Team	W		L	PCT	W		L	PCT
No. 9 Clemson ‍†‍‡‍^{y}	20	–	4	.833	57	–	18	.760
No. 2 Georgia Tech ‍‍‍^{y}	16	–	8	.667	50	–	17	.746
Duke ‍‍‍	16	–	8	.667	33	–	20	.623
No. 6 Florida State ‍‍‍^{y}	14	–	9	.609	53	–	22	.707
NC State ‍‍‍^{y}	13	–	11	.542	46	–	18	.719
North Carolina ‍‍‍	10	–	13	.435	34	–	21	.618
Wake Forest ‍‍‍	10	–	14	.417	37	–	20	.649
Maryland ‍‍‍	6	–	18	.250	24	–	30	.444
Virginia ‍‍‍	2	–	22	.083	20	–	34	.370
† – Conference champion ‡ – Tournament champion y – Invited to the NCAA tournament As of June 30, 1994; Rankings from Collegiate Baseball

The 1994 Georgia Tech Yellow Jackets baseball team represented the Georgia Institute of Technology in the 1994 NCAA Division I baseball season. The Yellow Jackets played their home games at Russ Chandler Stadium. The team was coached by Danny Hall in his 1st season at Georgia Tech.

The Yellow Jackets lost the College World Series, defeated by the Oklahoma Sooners in the championship game.

== Roster ==
1994 Georgia Tech Yellow Jackets roster
Pitchers: Carlos Cason; Geoff Duncan; Al Gogolin; Buck Hall; Brandon Hutchins; Shane McGill; Chris Myers; Brad Rigby; L. J. Yankosky	Infielders: Scott Byers; 5 Nomar Garciaparra; Brandon Hensley; Jimy Lincoln; Scott McIntyre; Michael Sorrow; Catchers: Tucker Barr; 33 Jason Varitek	Outfielders: Matt Barr; Adam Easterling; Jay Payton; Ryan Ritter; Matt Saier; Michael Smith; Coaches: Danny Hall - 1st Season; Rick Hatcher - 1st Season; Paul Mears - 3rd Season; Jeff Guy - 1st Season

== Schedule ==
1994 Georgia Tech Yellow Jackets baseball game log
Regular season
February (6–2)

Date	Opponent	Site/stadium	Score	Overall record	ACC record
February 11	Minnesota	Russ Chandler Stadium • Atlanta, GA	3–1	1–0	–
February 12	Minnesota	Russ Chandler Stadium • Atlanta, GA	10–5	2–0	–
February 13	Minnesota	Russ Chandler Stadium • Atlanta, GA	8–2	3–0	–
February 19	at Georgia Southern	Unknown • Statesboro, GA	6–3	4–0	–
February 20	at Georgia Southern	Unknown • Statesboro, GA	15–2	5–0	–
February 25	vs Oklahoma	Titan Field • Fullerton, CA	6–8	5–1	–
February 26	vs San Diego	Titan Field • Fullerton, CA	5–4	6–1	–
February 27	at Cal State Fullerton	Titan Field • Fullerton, CA	0–2	6–2	–

March (15–2)

Date	Opponent	Site/stadium	Score	Overall record	ACC record
March 5	Rutgers	Russ Chandler Stadium • Atlanta, GA	1–2	6–3	–
March 5	Rutgers	Russ Chandler Stadium • Atlanta, GA	17–7	7–3	–
March 6	Rutgers	Russ Chandler Stadium • Atlanta, GA	13–2	8–3	–
March 8	Appalachian State	Russ Chandler Stadium • Atlanta, GA	22–4	9–3	–
March 9	Appalachian State	Russ Chandler Stadium • Atlanta, GA	22–4	10–3	–
March 11	Virginia	Russ Chandler Stadium • Atlanta, GA	4–1	11–3	1–0
March 12	Virginia	Russ Chandler Stadium • Atlanta, GA	6–2	12–3	2–0
March 13	Virginia	Russ Chandler Stadium • Atlanta, GA	7–6	13–3	3–0
March 19	Siena	Russ Chandler Stadium • Atlanta, GA	26–1	14–3	3–0
March 20	Siena	Russ Chandler Stadium • Atlanta, GA	11–1	15–3	3–0
March 22	at Maryland	Shipley Field • College Park, MD	12–4	16–3	4–0
March 23	at Maryland	Shipley Field • College Park, MD	5–6	16–4	4–1
March 24	at Maryland	Shipley Field • College Park, MD	12–4	17–4	5–1
March 25	Ohio	Russ Chandler Stadium • Atlanta, GA	6–4	18–4	5–1
March 26	Ohio	Russ Chandler Stadium • Atlanta, GA	12–5	19–4	5–1
March 29	Winthrop	Russ Chandler Stadium • Atlanta, GA	12–2	20–4	5–1
March 30	Winthrop	Russ Chandler Stadium • Atlanta, GA	17–8	21–4	5–1

April (13–6)

Date	Opponent	Site/stadium	Score	Overall record	ACC record
April 1	North Carolina	Russ Chandler Stadium • Atlanta, GA	7–4	22–4	6–1
April 2	North Carolina	Russ Chandler Stadium • Atlanta, GA	7–6	23–4	7–1
April 3	North Carolina	Russ Chandler Stadium • Atlanta, GA	8–11	23–5	7–2
April 5	Georgia State	Russ Chandler Stadium • Atlanta, GA	4–3	24–5	7–2
April 8	Duke	Russ Chandler Stadium • Atlanta, GA	7–5	25–5	8–2
April 9	Duke	Russ Chandler Stadium • Atlanta, GA	9–2	26–5	9–2
April 10	Duke	Russ Chandler Stadium • Atlanta, GA	17–10	27–5	10–2
April 12	Georgia State	Russ Chandler Stadium • Atlanta, GA	28–3	28–5	10–2
April 13	Davidson	Russ Chandler Stadium • Atlanta, GA	4–6	28–6	10–2
April 15	at NC State	Doak Field • Raleigh, NC	7–8	28–7	10–3
April 16	at NC State	Doak Field • Raleigh, NC	11–7	29–7	11–3
April 17	at NC State	Doak Field • Raleigh, NC	7–4	30–7	12–3
April 20	at Georgia	Foley Field • Athens, GA	8–0	31–7	12–3
April 22	at Wake Forest	Ernie Shore Field • Winston-Salem, NC	1–2	31–8	12–4
April 23	at Wake Forest	Ernie Shore Field • Winston-Salem, NC	7–5	32–8	13–4
April 24	at Wake Forest	Ernie Shore Field • Winston-Salem, NC	2–14	32–9	13–5
April 26	Georgia	Russ Chandler Stadium • Atlanta, GA	13–2	33–9	13–5
April 29	at Florida State	Dick Howser Stadium • Tallahassee, FL	4–6	33–10	13–6
April 30	at Florida State	Dick Howser Stadium • Tallahassee, FL	6–2	34–10	14–6

May (7–3)

Date	Opponent	Site/stadium	Score	Overall record	ACC record
May 1	at Florida State	Dick Howser Stadium • Tallahassee, FL	7–5	35–10	15–6
May 4	at Mercer	Claude Smith Field • Macon, GA	5–6	35–11	15–6
May 6	Georgia Southern	Russ Chandler Stadium • Atlanta, GA	9–6	36–11	15–6
May 7	Georgia Southern	Russ Chandler Stadium • Atlanta, GA	8–6	37–11	15–6
May 8	Georgia Southern	Russ Chandler Stadium • Atlanta, GA	15–6	38–11	15–6
May 10	Georgia	Russ Chandler Stadium • Atlanta, GA	14–1	39–11	15–6
May 11	at Georgia State	Georgia State Baseball Complex • Decatur, GA	23–9	40–11	15–6
May 13	Clemson	Russ Chandler Stadium • Atlanta, GA	8–9	40–12	15–7
May 14	Clemson	Russ Chandler Stadium • Atlanta, GA	20–4	41–12	16–7
May 15	Clemson	Russ Chandler Stadium • Atlanta, GA	4–7	41–13	16–8

Postseason
Atlantic Coast Conference Tournament (2–2)

Date	Opponent	Site/stadium	Score	Overall record	ACC record
May 18	vs North Carolina	Greenville Municipal Stadium • Greenville, SC	7–4	42–13	16–8
May 19	vs Wake Forest	Greenville Municipal Stadium • Greenville, SC	6–0	43–13	16–8
May 20	vs Clemson	Greenville Municipal Stadium • Greenville, SC	6–9	43–14	16–8
May 21	vs NC State	Greenville Municipal Stadium • Greenville, SC	2–11	43–15	16–8

Midwest II Regional (4–1)

Date	Opponent	Site/stadium	Score	Overall record	ACC record
May 27	vs Connecticut	Eck Stadium • Wichita, KS	7–0	44–15	16–8
May 28	at Wichita State	Eck Stadium • Wichita, KS	13–1	45–15	16–8
May 29	vs Washington	Eck Stadium • Wichita, KS	6–2	46–15	16–8
May 30	vs Washington	Eck Stadium • Wichita, KS	9–12	46–16	16–8
May 30	vs Washington	Eck Stadium • Wichita, KS	18712	47–16	16–8

1994 College World Series (3–1)

Date	Opponent	Site/stadium	Score	Overall record	ACC record
June 3	vs Cal State Fullerton	Johnny Rosenblatt Stadium • Omaha, NE	2–0	48–16	16–8
June 5	vs Florida State	Johnny Rosenblatt Stadium • Omaha, NE	12–4	49–16	16–8
June 8	Cal State Fullerton	Johnny Rosenblatt Stadium • Omaha, NE	3–2	50–16	16–8
June 11	vs Oklahoma	Johnny Rosenblatt Stadium • Omaha, NE	5–13	50–17	16–8

== Awards and honors ==
Nomar Garciaparra

- First Team All-Atlantic Coast Conference
- All-Tournament Team

Jason Varitek

- First Team All-Atlantic Coast Conference
- All-Tournament Team

Brad Rigby

- First Team All-Atlantic Coast Conference
- All-Tournament Team

== Yellow Jackets in the 1994 MLB draft ==
The following members of the Georgia Tech Yellow Jackets baseball program were drafted in the 1994 Major League Baseball draft.

Round	Pick	Player	Position	MLB Club
1	12	Nomar Garciaparra	SS	Boston Red Sox
1	14	Jason Varitek	C	Seattle Mariners
1	29	Jay Payton	OF	New York Mets
2	36	Brad Rigby	P	Oakland Athletics
13	345	Al Gogolin	P	Oakland Athletics
38	1,065	Buck Hall	P	Texas Rangers
