= 1994 NCAA Division I baseball rankings =

1994 NCAA Division I baseball season

Tournament

College World Series
- Champions: Oklahoma
- Runners-up: Georgia Tech
- MOP: Chip Glass (Oklahoma)

Seasons
- ← 1993 1995 →

The following polls make up the 1994 NCAA Division I baseball rankings. USA Today and ESPN began publishing the Coaches' Poll of 31 active coaches ranking the top 25 teams in the nation in 1992. Each coach is a member of the American Baseball Coaches Association. Baseball America began publishing its poll of the top 20 teams in college baseball in 1981. Beginning with the 1985 season, it expanded to the top 25. Collegiate Baseball Newspaper published its first human poll of the top 20 teams in college baseball in 1957, and expanded to rank the top 30 teams in 1961.

== USA Today/ESPN Coaches' Poll ==
Currently, only the final poll from the 1994 season is available.

| Rank | Team |
|---|---|
| 1 | Oklahoma |
| 2 | Georgia Tech |
| 3 | Arizona State |
| 4 | Cal State Fullerton |
| 5 | Miami (FL) |
| 6 | Florida State |
| 7 | LSU |
| 8 | Auburn |
| 9 | Clemson |
| 10 | Oklahoma State |
| 11 | Southern California |
| 12 | Tennessee |
| 13 | Ohio State |
| 14 | Texas |
| 15 | Washington |
| 16 | Long Beach State |
| 17 | Notre Dame |
| 18 | Wichita State |
| 19 | Memphis |
| 20 | Stanford |
| 21 | NC State |
| 22 | Nevada |
| 23 | Florida |
| 24 | Kansas |
| 25 | Minnesota |

== Baseball America ==
Currently, only the final poll from the 1994 season is available.

| Rank | Team |
|---|---|
| 1 | Oklahoma |
| 2 | Georgia Tech |
| 3 | Cal State Fullerton |
| 4 | Clemson |
| 5 | Arizona State |
| 6 | Miami (FL) |
| 7 | Florida State |
| 8 | Tennessee |
| 9 | Oklahoma State |
| 10 | LSU |
| 11 | Southern California |
| 12 | Ohio State |
| 13 | Auburn |
| 14 | Texas |
| 15 | Stanford |
| 16 | Washington |
| 17 | Nevada |
| 18 | Long Beach State |
| 19 | Wichita State |
| 20 | Notre Dame |
| 21 | Texas Tech |
| 22 | TCU |
| 23 | Memphis |
| 24 | Kansas |
| 25 | Minnesota |

== Collegiate Baseball ==
Currently, only the final poll from the 1994 season is available.

| Rank | Team |
|---|---|
| 1 | Oklahoma |
| 2 | Georgia Tech |
| 3 | Cal State Fullerton |
| 4 | Arizona State |
| 5 | Miami (FL) |
| 6 | Florida State |
| 7 | LSU |
| 8 | Auburn |
| 9 | Clemson |
| 10 | Tennessee |
| 11 | Ohio State |
| 12 | Oklahoma State |
| 13 | Stanford |
| 14 | Southern California |
| 15 | Texas |
| 16 | Washington |
| 17 | Wichita State |
| 18 | Notre Dame |
| 19 | Nevada |
| 20 | Long Beach State |
| 21 | Florida |
| 22 | BYU |
| 23 | Memphis |
| 24 | Jacksonville |
| 25 | Kansas |
| 26 | Santa Clara |
| 27 | TCU |
| 28 | Minnesota |
| 29 | Kent State |
| 30 | Old Dominion |
