= 1994 Arizona Wildcats baseball team =

American college baseball season

1994 Arizona Wildcats baseball
- Conference: Pacific-10 Conference
- Record: 15–40 (7–23 Pac-10)
- Head coach: Jerry Kindall (22nd season)
- Assistant coach: Jerry Stitt (16th season)
- Home stadium: Sancet Stadium

1994 Pacific-10 Conference baseball standings
	Conf.				Overall
Team	W		L	PCT	W		L	PCT
Northern
Oregon State ^{x}‍‍‍	22	–	8	.733	35	–	19	.648
No. 16 Washington ‍‍‍^{y}	20	–	10	.667	46	–	18	.719
Portland State ‍‍‍	14	–	16	.467	30	–	24	.556
Gonzaga ‍‍‍	13	–	17	.433	29	–	23	.558
Washington State ‍‍‍	11	–	19	.367	35	–	26	.574
Portland ‍‍‍	10	–	20	.333	22	–	33	.400
Southern
No. 13 Stanford ^{x}‍‍‍^{y}	21	–	9	.700	36	–	24	.600
No. 4 Arizona State ‍‍‍^{y}	20	–	10	.667	45	–	18	.714
No. 14 Southern California ‍‍‍^{y}	19	–	11	.633	41	–	20	.672
California ‍‍‍	12	–	18	.400	25	–	35	.417
UCLA ‍‍‍	11	–	19	.367	22	–	36	.379
Arizona ‍‍‍	7	–	23	.233	15	–	40	.273
x – Division champion y – Invited to the NCAA tournament As of June 30, 1994; Rankings from Collegiate Baseball

The 1994 Arizona Wildcats baseball team represented the University of Arizona during the 1994 NCAA Division I baseball season. The Wildcats played their home games at Frank Sancet Stadium. The team was coached by Jerry Kindall in his 22nd season at Arizona. The Wildcats finished 15–40 overall and placed 6th in the Pacific-10's Southern Division with a 7–23 record. The Wildcats' 15 wins were the fewest the program had in a single season since winning only 12 games in 1949 (a year in which the team played only 18 games total). This season also saw the team finish with the lowest win percentage in program history (.273). Arizona both finished with a losing record and missed the postseason for 1st time since 1991.

== Previous season ==
The Wildcats finished the 1993 season with a record of 35–26 and 16–14 in conference play, finishing 3rd in the "Six-Pac" (Pac-10 Southern). Arizona reached the postseason for the final time in Jerry Kindall's tenure and were placed in the Midwest Regional, which was hosted by Oklahoma State University in Stillwater, Oklahoma. The team lost to Auburn in their 1st game but rallied to win their next 3 against North Carolina State, Fordham and Oklahoma State before finally being eliminated in the regional final against Oklahoma State.

== Personnel ==
=== Roster ===
1994 Arizona Wildcats baseball roster
• Steven Arffa • Tony Bouie • Andy Vincent • Tod Brown • Eric Cheney • Christopher Cooper • Clayton Crossan • Andre Dawson • Ryan Frace	• Robert Frisbee • Jeffrey Gjerde • Robert Host • Scott Kidd • Tom King • Shane Lake • Scott Lanning	• Anthony Marnell • John Powers • Zachary Pringle • Todd Singelyn • Richard Tomey • Theodore Warrecker • Ben White • Menno Wickey

=== Coaches ===
1994 Arizona Wildcats baseball coaching staff
- Jerry Kindall – Head coach
- Jerry Stitt – Assistant coach

== 1994 Schedule and results ==
1994 Arizona Wildcats baseball game log
Regular season
Date	Opponent	Site/Stadium	Score	Overall Record	Pac-10 Record
	New Mexico	Sancet Stadium • Tucson, AZ	W 4–1	1–0	
	New Mexico	Sancet Stadium • Tucson, AZ	L 8–10	1–1	
	New Mexico	Sancet Stadium • Tucson, AZ	L 8–11	1–2	
	at Cal State Fullerton	Titan Field • Fullerton, CA	L 0–9	1–3	
	at Cal State Fullerton	Titan Field • Fullerton, CA	L 3–6	1–4	
	at Cal State Fullerton	Titan Field • Fullerton, CA	L 2–5	1–5	
	Cal State Dominguez Hills	Sancet Stadium • Tucson, AZ	L 5–6	1–6	
	Cal State Dominguez Hills	Sancet Stadium • Tucson, AZ	W 2–1	2–6	
	New Mexico State	Sancet Stadium • Tucson, AZ	L 8–11	2–7	
	New Mexico State	Sancet Stadium • Tucson, AZ	L 9–12	2–8	
	New Mexico State	Sancet Stadium • Tucson, AZ	W 10–9	3–8	
	Texas A&M	Sancet Stadium • Tucson, AZ	L 3–16	3–9	
	Texas A&M	Sancet Stadium • Tucson, AZ	L 0–4	3–10	
	Texas A&M	Sancet Stadium • Tucson, AZ	L 5–14	3–11	
	at USC	Dedeaux Field • Los Angeles, CA	L 1–7	3–12	0–1
	at USC	Dedeaux Field • Los Angeles, CA	L 4–15	3–13	0–2
	at USC	Dedeaux Field • Los Angeles, CA	L 5–10	3–14	0–3
	vs Ohio State	Hubert H. Humphrey Metrodome • Minneapolis, MN	L 0–3	3–15	
	at Minnesota	Hubert H. Humphrey Metrodome • Minneapolis, MN	L 5–9	3–16	
	vs Arizona State	Hubert H. Humphrey Metrodome • Minneapolis, MN	L 4–12	3–17	
	at Arizona State	Packard Stadium • Tempe, AZ	L 6–16	3–18	0–4
	Arizona State	Sancet Stadium • Tucson, AZ	L 5–7	3–19	0–5
	Arizona State	Sancet Stadium • Tucson, AZ	W 8–7	4–19	1–5
	at Sacramento State	Hornet Field • Sacramento, CA	W 10–4	5–19	
	at Sacramento State	Hornet Field • Sacramento, CA	L 8–25	5–20	
	at California	Evans Diamond • Berkeley, CA	L 2–6	5–21	1–6
	at California	Evans Diamond • Berkeley, CA	L 6–15	5–22	1–7
	at California	Evans Diamond • Berkeley, CA	L 3–9	5–23	1–8
	Stanford	Sancet Stadium • Tucson, AZ	L 5–7	5–24	1–9
	Stanford	Sancet Stadium • Tucson, AZ	W 8–7	6–24	2–9
	Stanford	Sancet Stadium • Tucson, AZ	L 4–27	6–25	2–10
	at Grand Canyon	Brazell Stadium • Phoenix, AZ	L 12–14	6–26	
	USC	Sancet Stadium • Tucson, AZ	L 3–9	6–27	2–11
	USC	Sancet Stadium • Tucson, AZ	L 3–7	6–28	2–12
	USC	Sancet Stadium • Tucson, AZ	L 2–6	6–29	2–13
	Arizona State	Sancet Stadium • Tucson, AZ	W 8–2	7–29	3–13
	at Arizona State	Packard Stadium • Tempe, AZ	L 2–4	7–30	3–14
	at Arizona State	Packard Stadium • Tempe, AZ	L 4–15	7–31	3–15
	UCLA	Sancet Stadium • Tucson, AZ	W 6–1	8–31	4–15
	UCLA	Sancet Stadium • Tucson, AZ	L 6–10	8–32	4–16
	UCLA	Sancet Stadium • Tucson, AZ	W 4–2	9–32	5–16
	at Stanford	Sunken Diamond • Palo Alto, CA	L 3–8	9–33	5–17
	at Stanford	Sunken Diamond • Palo Alto, CA	L 3–10	9–34	5–18
	at Stanford	Sunken Diamond • Palo Alto, CA	L 1–5	9–35	5–19
	California	Sancet Stadium • Tucson, AZ	W 7–6	10–35	6–19
	California	Sancet Stadium • Tucson, AZ	W 14–5	11–35	7–19
	California	Sancet Stadium • Tucson, AZ	L 8–14	11–36	7–20
	Grand Canyon	Sancet Stadium • Tucson, AZ	W 6–5	12–36	
	Grand Canyon	Sancet Stadium • Tucson, AZ	W 5–2	13–36	
	at UCLA	Jackie Robinson Stadium • Los Angeles, CA	L 4–9	13–37	7–21
	at UCLA	Jackie Robinson Stadium • Los Angeles, CA	L 5–13	13–38	7–22
	at UCLA	Jackie Robinson Stadium • Los Angeles, CA	L 6–9	13–39	7–23
	at Long Beach State	Blair Field • Long Beach, CA	W 4–0	14–39	
	at Long Beach State	Blair Field • Long Beach, CA	L 7–11	14–40	
	at Long Beach State	Blair Field • Long Beach, CA	W 3–1	15–40	

== 1994 MLB draft ==
Player	Position	Round	Overall	MLB team
Steve Arffa	LHP	13	344	New York Mets
Mike Schiefelbein	RHP	15	424	San Francisco Giants
Teddy Warrecker	RHP	24	661	Cleveland Indians
