= 1994 Auburn Tigers baseball team =

American college baseball season

1994 Auburn Tigers baseball

NCAA East Regional champions

College World Series, 0–2
- Conference: Southeastern Conference
- Western Division

Ranking
- Coaches: No. 8
- CB: No. 8
- Record: 44–21 (16–13 SEC)
- Head coach: Hal Baird (10th season)
- Home stadium: Plainsman Park

1994 Southeastern Conference baseball standings
	Conf.				Overall
Team	W		L	PCT	W		L	PCT
Eastern
No. 10 Tennessee ^{x}‍†‍‡‍^{y}	24	–	5	.828	52	–	14	.788
No. 21 Florida ‍‍‍^{y}	16	–	9	.640	40	–	23	.635
Kentucky ‍‍‍	11	–	14	.440	32	–	25	.561
South Carolina ‍‍‍	11	–	15	.423	35	–	23	.603
Vanderbilt ‍‍‍	10	–	20	.333	28	–	30	.483
Georgia ‍‍‍	9	–	19	.321	22	–	35	.386
Western
No. 7 LSU ^{x}‍‍‡‍^{y}	21	–	6	.778	46	–	20	.697
Mississippi State ‍‍‍	15	–	12	.556	36	–	23	.610
No. 8 Auburn ‍‍‍^{y}	16	–	13	.552	44	–	21	.677
Arkansas ‍‍‍	13	–	13	.500	30	–	27	.526
Ole Miss ‍‍‍	12	–	14	.462	30	–	26	.536
Alabama ‍‍‍	4	–	22	.154	21	–	35	.375
x – Division champion † – Conference champion ‡ – Tournament champion y – Invited to the NCAA tournament As of June 30, 1994; Rankings from Collegiate Baseball

The 1994 Auburn Tigers baseball team represented Auburn University in the 1994 NCAA Division I baseball season. The Tigers played their home games at Plainsman Park. They were led by head coach Hal Baird, in his tenth season as head coach of the program.

The Tigers reached the College World Series, where they were eliminated after losing games to Oklahoma and Miami (FL).

== Personnel ==
=== Roster ===
1994 Auburn Tigers roster
Pitchers: 7 - John Powell; 9 - Lance Tolbert; 12 - Kevin Humphreys; 17 - Rodney Dickinson; 19 - Jason LeBoeuf; 21 - Michael McKenna; 22 - Troy Rorex; 28 - Ryan Halla; 32 - Todd Gober; 33 - Chris Morrison	Catchers: 10 - Peter Kanakis; 11 - Robert Lewis; 18 - Dallan Ruch; 24 - Kevin Chabot; Outfielders: 1 - Ken Key; 3 - Reggie Hightower; 5 - Russell Whittenburg; 6 - McKenzie Daniel; 15 - Mike Killimett; 23 - Frank Sanders; 27 - Chad Speegle	Infielders: 2 - Rob Macrory; 4 - Brandon Moore; 8 - Mark Bellhorn; 20 - Jay Waggoner; 25 - Shawn McNally

== Schedule and results ==
1994 Auburn Tigers baseball game log
Regular season

February (5–1)
Date	Opponent	Site/stadium	Score	Overall record	SEC record
Winn Dixie Showdown
February 18	vs. LSU*	Louisiana Superdome • New Orleans, LA	W 3–1	1–0	–
February 19	vs. New Orleans*	Louisiana Superdome • New Orleans, LA	L 1–3	1–1	–
February 20	vs. Tulane*	Louisiana Superdome • New Orleans, LA	W 5–2	2–1	–
February 26	Middle Tennessee*	Plainsman Park • Auburn, AL	W 19–3	3–1	–
February 26	Middle Tennessee*	Plainsman Park • Auburn, AL	W 9–2	4–1	–
February 27	Middle Tennessee*	Plainsman Park • Auburn, AL	W 11–9	5–1	–

March (13–3)
Date	Opponent	Site/stadium	Score	Overall record	SEC record
March 2	Troy State*	Plainsman Park • Auburn, AL	W 32–9	6–1	–
March 5	Jacksonville State*	Plainsman Park • Auburn, AL	L 6–11	6–2	–
March 6	Jacksonville State*	Plainsman Park • Auburn, AL	W 8–2	7–2	–
March 8	at Samford*	Joe Lee Griffin Stadium • Homewood, AL	W 12–3	8–2	–
March 10	Georgia State*	Plainsman Park • Auburn, AL	W 18–13	9–2	–
March 19	Murray State*	Plainsman Park • Auburn, AL	W 10–1	10–2	–
March 19	Murray State*	Plainsman Park • Auburn, AL	W 10–1	11–2	–
March 21	Siena*	Plainsman Park • Auburn, AL	W 18–0	12–2	–
March 21	Siena*	Plainsman Park • Auburn, AL	W 15–1	13–2	–
March 22	at Middle Tennessee*	Reese Smith Jr. Field • Murfreesboro, TN	W 6–1	14–2	–
March 23	at UAB*	Jerry D. Young Memorial Field • Birmingham, AL	L 3–9	14–3	–
March 25	Georgia	Plainsman Park • Auburn, AL	W 23–1	15–3	1–0
March 26	Georgia	Plainsman Park • Auburn, AL	W 9–5	16–3	2–0
March 27	Georgia	Plainsman Park • Auburn, AL	L 12–13	16–4	2–1
March 30	Columbus College*	Plainsman Park • Auburn, AL	W 7–2	17–4	2–1
March 31	Georgia State*	Plainsman Park • Auburn, AL	W 5–2	18–4	2–1

April (12–8)
Date	Opponent	Site/stadium	Score	Overall record	SEC record
April 1	at Tennessee	Lindsey Nelson Stadium • Knoxville, TN	W 6–3	19–4	3–1
April 2	at Tennessee	Lindsey Nelson Stadium • Knoxville, TN	W 3–1	20–4	4–1
April 3	at Tennessee	Lindsey Nelson Stadium • Knoxville, TN	L 4–8	20–5	4–2
April 8	Vanderbilt	Plainsman Park • Auburn, AL	W 5–3	21–5	5–2
April 9	Vanderbilt	Plainsman Park • Auburn, AL	W 20–7	22–5	6–2
April 10	Vanderbilt	Plainsman Park • Auburn, AL	W 10–3	23–5	7–2
April 11	East Tennessee State*	Plainsman Park • Auburn, AL	L 7–9	23–6	7–2
April 13	Birmingham–Southern*	Plainsman Park • Auburn, AL	W 7–4	24–6	7–2
April 15	at Arkansas	George Cole Field • Fayetteville, AR	L 6–7	24–7	7–3
April 16	at Arkansas	George Cole Field • Fayetteville, AR	W 6–3	25–7	8–3
April 17	at Arkansas	George Cole Field • Fayetteville, AR	L 0–10	25–8	8–4
April 19	Mercer*	Plainsman Park • Auburn, AL	L 3–4	25–9	8–4
April 20	Mercer*	Plainsman Park • Auburn, AL	W 7–6	26–9	8–4
April 22	Mississippi State	Plainsman Park • Auburn, AL	L 1–4 (10)	26–10	8–5
April 23	Mississippi State	Plainsman Park • Auburn, AL	W 19–5	27–10	9–5
April 24	Mississippi State	Plainsman Park • Auburn, AL	W 4–2	28–10	10–5
April 26	at UAB*	Jerry D. Young Memorial Field • Birmingham, AL	W 7–2	29–10	10–5
April 27	Samford*	Plainsman Park • Auburn, AL	W 9–8	30–10	10–5
April 29	at Ole Miss	Swayze Field • Oxford, MS	L 0–2	30–11	10–6
April 30	at Ole Miss	Swayze Field • Oxford, MS	L 3–8	30–12	10–7

May (7–5)
Date	Opponent	Site/stadium	Score	Overall record	SEC record
May 1	at Ole Miss	Swayze Field • Oxford, MS	W 5–3	31–12	11–7
May 2	vs. Troy State*	Paterson Field • Montgomery, AL	L 3–6	31–13	11–7
May 4	vs. Alabama*	Paterson Field • Montgomery, AL	W 8–7	32–13	11–7
May 6	LSU	Plainsman Park • Auburn, AL	L 6–13 (10)	32–14	11–8
May 7	LSU	Plainsman Park • Auburn, AL	L 3–4	32–15	11–9
May 8	LSU	Plainsman Park • Auburn, AL	L 3–4	32–16	11–10
May 10	Radford*	Plainsman Park • Auburn, AL	W 4–2	33–16	11–10
May 10	Radford*	Plainsman Park • Auburn, AL	W 7–3	34–16	11–10
May 11	UAB*	Plainsman Park • Auburn, AL	W 9–3	35–16	11–10
May 12	vs. Alabama	Joe W. Davis Stadium • Huntsville, AL	L 5–6	35–17	11–11
May 13	at Alabama	Sewell–Thomas Stadium • Tuscaloosa, AL	W 5–4	36–17	12–11
May 14	at Alabama	Sewell–Thomas Stadium • Tuscaloosa, AL	W 6–3	37–17	13–11

Postseason

SEC West Tournament (3–2)
Date	Opponent	Seed	Site/stadium	Score	Overall record	SECT record
May 19	(4) Arkansas	(3)	Swayze Field • Oxford, MS	W 3–1 (17)	38–17	1–0
May 20	(2) Mississippi State	(3)	Swayze Field • Oxford, MS	W 2–1	39–17	2–0
May 21	(1) LSU	(3)	Swayze Field • Oxford, MS	L 2–3	39–18	2–1
May 21	(2) Mississippi State	(3)	Swayze Field • Oxford, MS	W 9–5	40–18	3–1
May 22	(1) LSU	(3)	Swayze Field • Oxford, MS	L 4–5	40–19	3–2

NCAA East Regional (4–0)
Date	Opponent	Seed	Site/stadium	Score	Overall record	Reg record
May 26	(5) Virginia Tech	(2)	Beautiful Tiger Field • Clemson, SC	W 7–0	41–19	1–0
May 27	(3) Old Dominion	(2)	Beautiful Tiger Field • Clemson, SC	W 11–8 (10)	42–19	2–0
May 28	(1) Clemson	(2)	Beautiful Tiger Field • Clemson, SC	W 11–5	43–19	3–0
May 29	(4) Notre Dame	(2)	Beautiful Tiger Field • Clemson, SC	W 8–0	44–19	4–0

College World Series (0–2)
Date	Opponent	Seed	Site/stadium	Score	Overall record	CWS record
June 4	(4) Oklahoma	(5)	Johnny Rosenblatt Stadium • Omaha, NE	L 4–5	44–20	0–1
June 6	(1) Miami (FL)	(5)	Johnny Rosenblatt Stadium • Omaha, NE	L 5–7	44–21	0–2

- Win
- Loss
- (#) Tournament seedings in parentheses.
