= Shane Dennis =

American baseball player

Shane Dennis (born July 3, 1971) is an American former professional baseball player. He played in the San Diego Padres organization and in the Pacific League for the Chiba Lotte Marines in 1997 and 1998. He played and served as a director of operations for the Wichita State University baseball team. Dennis was a first-team All-American in 1994.

He currently works as an award-winning radio talk show host in Wichita, Kansas as host of The Shane Dennis Show on weekdays from 12:00 pm to 2:00 pm central time on KKGQ.
