= 1994 Miami Hurricanes baseball team =

American college baseball season

1994 Miami Hurricanes baseball

NCAA Atlantic I Regional champions

College World Series, 1–2
- Conference: Independent
- Record: 49–14
- Head coach: Jim Morris (1st year)
- Home stadium: Mark Light Field

1994 NCAA Division I baseball independents standings
| | Conf. | | | | Overall |
| Team | W | | L | PCT | W | | L | PCT |
|---|---|---|---|---|---|---|---|---|
| No. 5 Miami (FL) ‍‍‍^{y} | | – | | – | 49 | – | 14 | .778 |
| Troy State ‍‍‍ | | – | | – | 34 | – | 16 | .680 |
| Grand Canyon ‍‍‍ | | – | | – | 29 | – | 33 | .468 |
| Northeastern Illinois ‍‍‍ | | – | | – | 20 | – | 32 | .385 |
| Chicago State ‍‍‍ | | – | | – | 9 | – | 40 | .184 |
| Southern Utah ‍‍‍ | | – | | – | 7 | – | 43 | .140 |
y – Invited to the NCAA tournament As of June 30, 1994; Rankings from Collegiate Baseball

The 1994 Miami Hurricanes baseball team represented the University of Miami in the 1994 NCAA Division I baseball season. The Hurricanes played their home games at Mark Light Field. The team was coached by Jim Morris in his first season at Miami.

The Hurricanes reached the College World Series, where they finished tied for fifth after recording a win against Auburn and a pair of losses to Arizona State.

== Personnel ==
=== Roster ===
1994 Miami Hurricanes roster
| Pitchers: - J. D. Arteaga; - Toby Dollar; - Danny Graves; - Kenny Henderson; - Eric Morgan; - Jay Tessmer; - Allan Westfall; Catchers: - Mat Erwin; - Jim Gargiulo; - Mike Lopez–Cao | Infielders: - Danny Buxbaum; - Alex Cora; - Luis Hernandez; - Mike Metcalfe; - Alex Miranda; Outfielders: - Rick Gama; - Rudy Gomez; - Ryan Grimmett; - Walter Owens; - Bruce Thompson; - Mike Torti | Unknown: - Ryan Brannan; - Sean Duncan; - Chad Hoelker; - Marc Mestre; - Dennis Pujals; - Fernando Ruiz |

=== Coaches ===
1994 Miami Hurricanes baseball coaching staff
- Jim Morris – Head coach – 1st year

== Schedule and results ==
Legend
| Miami win |
| Miami loss |

1994 Miami Hurricanes baseball game log
Regular season

February
| Date | Opponent | Site/stadium | Score | Overall record |
|---|---|---|---|---|
| Feb 2 | Barry | Mark Light Field • Coral Gables, FL | W 8–0 | 1–0 |
| Feb 4 | Tennessee | Mark Light Field • Coral Gables, FL | W 6–0 | 2–0 |
| Feb 5 | Tennessee | Mark Light Field • Coral Gables, FL | W 3–1 | 3–0 |
| Feb 6 | Tennessee | Mark Light Field • Coral Gables, FL | W 1–0 | 4–0 |
| Feb 8 | FIU | Mark Light Field • Coral Gables, FL | W 11–4 | 5–0 |
| Feb 11 | Stetson | Mark Light Field • Coral Gables, FL | W 6–4 | 6–0 |
| Feb 12 | Stetson | Mark Light Field • Coral Gables, FL | L 4–7 | 6–1 |
| Feb 13 | Stetson | Mark Light Field • Coral Gables, FL | L 3–5 | 6–2 |
| Feb 15 | FIU | Mark Light Field • Coral Gables, FL | W 4–0 | 7–2 |
| Feb 19 | at Florida | Alfred A. McKethan Stadium • Gainesville, FL | W 4–3^{10} | 8–2 |
| Feb 20 | at Florida | Alfred A. McKethan Stadium • Gainesville, FL | L 0–5 | 8–3 |
| Feb 25 | Minnesota | Mark Light Field • Coral Gables, FL | W 14–4 | 9–3 |
| Feb 26 | Minnesota | Mark Light Field • Coral Gables, FL | L 0–2 | 9–4 |
| Feb 27 | Minnesota | Mark Light Field • Coral Gables, FL | W 5–2 | 10–4 |

March
| Date | Opponent | Site/stadium | Score | Overall record |
|---|---|---|---|---|
| Mar 3 | FIU | Mark Light Field • Coral Gables, FL | W 3–0 | 11–4 |
| Mar 5 | Illinois | Mark Light Field • Coral Gables, FL | W 7–1 | 12–4 |
| Mar 6 | Illinois | Mark Light Field • Coral Gables, FL | W 6–2 | 13–4 |
| Mar 9 | Pace | Mark Light Field • Coral Gables, FL | W 8–2 | 14–4 |
| Mar 11 | Florida | Mark Light Field • Coral Gables, FL | W 4–3 | 15–4 |
| Mar 12 | Florida | Mark Light Field • Coral Gables, FL | W 4–2 | 16–4 |
| Mar 13 | at Florida Atlantic | FAU Baseball Stadium • Boca Raton, FL | W 7–4 | 17–4 |
| Mar 15 | Rutgers | Mark Light Field • Coral Gables, FL | W 14–5 | 18–4 |
| Mar 16 | Rutgers | Mark Light Field • Coral Gables, FL | W 7–6 | 19–4 |
| Mar 18 | Southern Illinois | Mark Light Field • Coral Gables, FL | W 5–1 | 20–4 |
| Mar 19 | Southern Illinois | Mark Light Field • Coral Gables, FL | W 12–3 | 21–4 |
| Mar 25 | at Jacksonville | John Sessions Stadium • Jacksonville, FL | L 2–5 | 21–5 |
| Mar 26 | at Jacksonville | John Sessions Stadium • Jacksonville, FL | W 5–3 | 22–5 |
| Mar 27 | at Jacksonville | John Sessions Stadium • Jacksonville, FL | W 8–6 | 23–5 |
| Mar 29 | Northeastern | Mark Light Field • Coral Gables, FL | W 2–0 | 24–5 |

April
| Date | Opponent | Site/stadium | Score | Overall record |
|---|---|---|---|---|
| Apr 2 | at Notre Dame | Frank Eck Stadium • Notre Dame, IN | W 19–7 | 25–5 |
| Apr 2 | at Notre Dame | Frank Eck Stadium • Notre Dame, IN | W 5–2 | 26–5 |
| Apr 3 | at Notre Dame | Frank Eck Stadium • Notre Dame, IN | W 4–2 | 27–5 |
| Apr 5 | Rollins | Mark Light Field • Coral Gables, FL | L 2–4 | 27–6 |
| Apr 8 | at Florida State | Dick Howser Stadium • Tallahassee, FL | L 3–6 | 27–7 |
| Apr 9 | at Florida State | Dick Howser Stadium • Tallahassee, FL | W 5–1 | 28–7 |
| Apr 10 | at Florida State | Dick Howser Stadium • Tallahassee, FL | W 2–1 | 29–7 |
| Apr 12 | Florida Atlantic | Mark Light Field • Coral Gables, FL | W 7–3 | 30–7 |
| Apr 15 | Florida State | Mark Light Field • Coral Gables, FL | L 1–6 | 30–8 |
| Apr 16 | Florida State | Mark Light Field • Coral Gables, FL | W 8–0 | 31–8 |
| Apr 17 | Florida State | Mark Light Field • Coral Gables, FL | L 2–7 | 31–9 |
| Apr 19 | Florida Southern | Mark Light Field • Coral Gables, FL | W 7–6^{11} | 32–9 |
| Apr 20 | Florida Southern | Mark Light Field • Coral Gables, FL | W 5–1 | 33–9 |
| Apr 22 | St. Thomas | Mark Light Field • Coral Gables, FL | W 8–6 | 34–9 |
| Apr 23 | St. Thomas | Mark Light Field • Coral Gables, FL | W 9–4 | 35–9 |
| Apr 29 | at Clemson | Beautiful Tiger Field • Clemson, SC | L 5–7 | 35–10 |
| Apr 30 | at Clemson | Beautiful Tiger Field • Clemson, SC | W 6–3 | 36–10 |

May
| Date | Opponent | Site/stadium | Score | Overall record |
|---|---|---|---|---|
| May 1 | at Clemson | Beautiful Tiger Field • Clemson, SC | L 8–9^{12} | 36–11 |
| May 6 | Barry | Mark Light Field • Coral Gables, FL | W 11–3 | 37–11 |
| May 7 | Tampa | Mark Light Field • Coral Gables, FL | W 10–4 | 38–11 |
| May 8 | Tampa | Mark Light Field • Coral Gables, FL | W 3–0 | 39–11 |
| May 10 | FIU | Mark Light Field • Coral Gables, FL | L 5–6 | 39–12 |
| May 13 | Western Carolina | Mark Light Field • Coral Gables, FL | W 7–2 | 40–12 |
| May 14 | Western Carolina | Mark Light Field • Coral Gables, FL | W 8–2 | 41–12 |
| May 15 | Western Carolina | Mark Light Field • Coral Gables, FL | W 5–4 | 42–12 |
| May 20 | Coastal Carolina | Mark Light Field • Coral Gables, FL | W 4–1 | 43–12 |
| May 21 | Coastal Carolina | Mark Light Field • Coral Gables, FL | W 7–4 | 44–12 |

Postseason

NCAA Atlantic I Regional
| Date | Opponent | Seed | Site/stadium | Score | Overall record | NCAAT record |
|---|---|---|---|---|---|---|
| May 22 | (6) Rider | (1) | Mark Light Field • Coral Gables, FL | W 17–4 | 45–12 | 1–0 |
| May 23 | (3) Kent State | (1) | Mark Light Field • Coral Gables, FL | W 4–1 | 46–12 | 2–0 |
| May 24 | (4) Minnesota | (1) | Mark Light Field • Coral Gables, FL | W 11–3 | 47–12 | 3–0 |
| May 24 | (2) Florida | (1) | Mark Light Field • Coral Gables, FL | W 10–6 | 48–12 | 4–0 |

College World Series
| Date | Opponent | Seed | Site/stadium | Score | Overall record | CWS record |
|---|---|---|---|---|---|---|
| June 4 | (8) Arizona State | (1) | Johnny Rosenblatt Stadium • Omaha, NE | L 0–4 | 48–13 | 0–1 |
| June 6 | (5) Auburn | (1) | Johnny Rosenblatt Stadium • Omaha, NE | W 7–5 | 49–13 | 1–1 |
| June 7 | (8) Arizona State | (1) | Johnny Rosenblatt Stadium • Omaha, NE | L 5–9 | 49–14 | 1–2 |
