= Mike Metcalfe =

American baseball player (born 1973)

- Outfielder/Second baseman
- Born: January 2, 1973 (age 53); Quantico, Virginia
- Batted: Right Threw: Right

MLB debut
- September 18, 1998, for the Los Angeles Dodgers

Last MLB appearance
- July 9, 2000, for the Los Angeles Dodgers

MLB statistics
- Batting average: .077
- Hits: 1
- Strikeouts: 3
- Stats at Baseball Reference

Teams
- Los Angeles Dodgers (1998, 2000)

Michael Henry Metcalfe Jr. (born January 2, 1973) is a former utility player in Major League Baseball who played eight games for the Los Angeles Dodgers in 1998 and 2000.

He graduated from the University of Miami, and in 1993 he played collegiate summer baseball with the Hyannis Mets of the Cape Cod Baseball League where he was named a league all-star. He was selected by the Dodgers in the 3rd round of the 1994 MLB draft. Metcalfe played eight games with the Dodgers in 1998 and 2000 – including four games as an outfielder and two as a second baseman – but spent most of his career in the minor league systems of the Dodgers and later the Cincinnati Reds and Kansas City Royals.
