= 1994 Florida State Seminoles baseball team =

American college baseball season

1994 Florida State Seminoles baseball

NCAA Atlantic II Regional champions

College World Series, 1–2
- Conference: Atlantic Coast Conference
- Record: 53–22 (14–9 ACC)
- Head coach: Mike Martin (15th year)
- Home stadium: Dick Howser Stadium

1994 Atlantic Coast Conference baseball standings
	Conf.				Overall
Team	W		L	PCT	W		L	PCT
No. 9 Clemson ‍†‍‡‍^{y}	20	–	4	.833	57	–	18	.760
No. 2 Georgia Tech ‍‍‍^{y}	16	–	8	.667	50	–	17	.746
Duke ‍‍‍	16	–	8	.667	33	–	20	.623
No. 6 Florida State ‍‍‍^{y}	14	–	9	.609	53	–	22	.707
NC State ‍‍‍^{y}	13	–	11	.542	46	–	18	.719
North Carolina ‍‍‍	10	–	13	.435	34	–	21	.618
Wake Forest ‍‍‍	10	–	14	.417	37	–	20	.649
Maryland ‍‍‍	6	–	18	.250	24	–	30	.444
Virginia ‍‍‍	2	–	22	.083	20	–	34	.370
† – Conference champion ‡ – Tournament champion y – Invited to the NCAA tournament As of June 30, 1994; Rankings from Collegiate Baseball

The 1994 Florida State Seminoles baseball team represented Florida State University in the 1994 NCAA Division I baseball season. The Seminoles played their home games at Dick Howser Stadium, and played as part of the Atlantic Coast Conference. The team was coached by Mike Martin in his fifteenth season as head coach at Florida State.

The Seminoles reached the College World Series, their thirteenth appearance in Omaha, where they finished tied for fifth place after recording a win against LSU and losses to Georgia Tech and Cal State Fullerton.

== Personnel ==
=== Roster ===
1994 Florida State Seminoles roster
Pitchers: 6 - Phil Olson - Sophomore; 13 - Jonathan Johnson - Sophomore; 15 - Todd Harrell - (redshirt) Junior; 29 - Tim Miller - Freshman; 31 - David Yocum - Freshman; 32 - Paul Wilson - Junior; 35 - Scooby Morgan - Sophomore; 39 - Chuck Howell - Freshman; 41 - Lane Chance - Junior; 44 - Mike Bell - Junior; 49 - Charlie Cruz - Junior; 51 - Steve Butler - Freshman	Catchers: 4 - Mike Martin - Junior; 22 - Colby Weaver - Junior; 33 - Charles McQuaig - (redshirt) Freshman; Infielders: 2 - Mickey Lopez - Sophomore; 7 - Chad Sheffer - Sophomore; 9 - Scott Zech - Freshman; 10 - Link Jarrett - Senior; 18 - Jack Niles - Senior; 25 - Doug Mientkiewicz - Sophomore; 26 - Danny Kanell - Sophomore	Outfielders: 14 - Randy Hodges - Junior; 17 - Jamie Stafford - Freshman; 19 - James Colzie - Freshman; 21 - Scott Schroeffel - Sophomore; 23 - Mike Buttery - Junior; 24 - Clint Hendry - Sophomore; 27 - Steve Nedeau - Sophomore; 30 - Scott Bentley - Freshman; 37 - Jeremy Morris - Freshman

=== Coaches ===
1994 Florida State Seminoles baseball coaching staff
- Mike Martin - Head coach - 15th year

== Schedule and results ==
Legend
Florida State win
Florida State loss

1994 Florida State Seminoles baseball game log
Regular season

February
Date	Opponent	Site/stadium	Score	Overall record	ACC record
Feb 3	at Hawaii*	Rainbow Stadium • Honolulu, HI	W 11–3	1–0	
Feb 4	at Hawaii*	Rainbow Stadium • Honolulu, HI	L 1–6	1–1	
Feb 4	at Hawaii*	Rainbow Stadium • Honolulu, HI	W 6–4	2–1	
Feb 6	at Hawaii*	Rainbow Stadium • Honolulu, HI	W 9–3	3–1	
Feb 7	at Hawaii–Hilo*	Wong Stadium • Hilo, HI	L 2–4^{7}	3–2	
Feb 8	at Hawaii–Hilo*	Wong Stadium • Hilo, HI	W 7–1	4–2	
Feb 8	at Hawaii–Hilo*	Wong Stadium • Hilo, HI	W 5–1	5–2	
Feb 11	Arizona State*	Dick Howser Stadium • Tallahassee, FL	W 9–7	6–2	
Feb 12	Arizona State*	Dick Howser Stadium • Tallahassee, FL	W 13–2	7–2	
Feb 13	Arizona State*	Dick Howser Stadium • Tallahassee, FL	W 9–8^{8}	8–2	
Feb 18	Minnesota*	Dick Howser Stadium • Tallahassee, FL	W 15–10	9–2	
Feb 19	Minnesota*	Dick Howser Stadium • Tallahassee, FL	W 9–2	10–2	
Feb 20	Minnesota*	Dick Howser Stadium • Tallahassee, FL	W 12–4	11–2	
Feb 25	Coastal Carolina*	Dick Howser Stadium • Tallahassee, FL	W 4–0	12–2	
Feb 26	Coastal Carolina*	Dick Howser Stadium • Tallahassee, FL	W 17–2	13–2	
Feb 27	Coastal Carolina*	Dick Howser Stadium • Tallahassee, FL	W 4–1	14–2	

March
Date	Opponent	Site/stadium	Score	Overall record	ACC record
Mar 3	at Florida*	Alfred A. McKethan Stadium • Gainesville, FL	L 0–4	14–3	
Mar 4	at Florida*	Alfred A. McKethan Stadium • Gainesville, FL	W 10–5	15–3	
Mar 5	Florida*	Dick Howser Stadium • Tallahassee, FL	W 7–2	16–3	
Mar 6	Florida*	Dick Howser Stadium • Tallahassee, FL	L 5–12	16–4	
Mar 8	College of Charleston*	Dick Howser Stadium • Tallahassee, FL	L 0–3	16–5	
Mar 9	College of Charleston*	Dick Howser Stadium • Tallahassee, FL	W 4–0	17–5	
Mar 10	College of Charleston*	Dick Howser Stadium • Tallahassee, FL	W 7–0	18–5	
Mar 12	Southeast Missouri State*	Dick Howser Stadium • Tallahassee, FL	W 15–3	19–5	
Mar 13	Southeast Missouri State*	Dick Howser Stadium • Tallahassee, FL	W 13–3	20–5	
Mar 15	UNC Asheville*	Dick Howser Stadium • Tallahassee, FL	W 3–0	21–5	
Mar 16	UNC Asheville*	Dick Howser Stadium • Tallahassee, FL	W 11–2	22–5	
Mar 17	Maryland	Dick Howser Stadium • Tallahassee, FL	W 5–2	23–5	1–0
Mar 18	Maryland	Dick Howser Stadium • Tallahassee, FL	W 6–0	24–5	2–0
Mar 19	Maryland	Dick Howser Stadium • Tallahassee, FL	L 4–6	24–6	2–1
Mar 22	at Wake Forest	Gene Hooks Stadium • Winston-Salem, NC	W 12–2	25–6	3–1
Mar 23	at Wake Forest	Gene Hooks Stadium • Winston-Salem, NC	W 15–4	26–6	4–1
Mar 24	at Wake Forest	Gene Hooks Stadium • Winston-Salem, NC	W 17–4	27–6	5–1
Mar 25	at North Carolina	Boshamer Stadium • Chapel Hill, NC	L 2–3	27–7	5–2
Mar 26	at North Carolina	Boshamer Stadium • Chapel Hill, NC	W 9–5	28–7	6–2

April
Date	Opponent	Site/stadium	Score	Overall record	ACC record
Apr 1	NC State	Dick Howser Stadium • Tallahassee, FL	W 3–2^{10}	29–7	7–2
Apr 2	NC State	Dick Howser Stadium • Tallahassee, FL	W 2–1	30–7	8–2
Apr 3	NC State	Dick Howser Stadium • Tallahassee, FL	W 8–7	31–7	9–2
Apr 6	Jacksonville*	Dick Howser Stadium • Tallahassee, FL	W 6–1^{8}	32–7	
Apr 8	Miami (FL)*	Dick Howser Stadium • Tallahassee, FL	W 6–3	33–7	
Apr 9	Miami (FL)*	Dick Howser Stadium • Tallahassee, FL	L 2–5	33–8	
Apr 10	Miami (FL)*	Dick Howser Stadium • Tallahassee, FL	L 1–2	33–9	
Apr 12	Mercer*	Dick Howser Stadium • Tallahassee, FL	W 11–0^{8}	34–9	
Apr 13	Mercer*	Dick Howser Stadium • Tallahassee, FL	W 5–4	35–9	
Apr 15	at Miami (FL)*	Mark Light Field • Coral Gables, FL	W 6–1	36–9	
Apr 16	at Miami (FL)*	Mark Light Field • Coral Gables, FL	L 0–8	36–10	
Apr 17	at Miami (FL)*	Mark Light Field • Coral Gables, FL	W 7–2	37–10	
Apr 20	at Jacksonville*	Jacksonville, FL	L 0–3	37–11	
Apr 23	Furman*	Dick Howser Stadium • Tallahassee, FL	W 8–0	38–11	
Apr 24	Furman*	Dick Howser Stadium • Tallahassee, FL	W 15–0	39–11	
Apr 29	Georgia Tech	Dick Howser Stadium • Tallahassee, FL	W 6–4	40–11	10–2
Apr 30	Georgia Tech	Dick Howser Stadium • Tallahassee, FL	L 2–6	40–12	10–3

May
Date	Opponent	Site/stadium	Score	Overall record	ACC record
May 1	Georgia Tech	Dick Howser Stadium • Tallahassee, FL	L 5–7	40–13	10–4
May 3	Duke	Dick Howser Stadium • Tallahassee, FL	L 1–4	40–14	10–5
May 4	Duke	Dick Howser Stadium • Tallahassee, FL	W 11–7	41–14	11–5
May 5	Duke	Dick Howser Stadium • Tallahassee, FL	L 4–5	41–15	11–6
May 7	at Clemson	Beautiful Tiger Field • Clemson, SC	L 2–5	41–16	11–7
May 8	at Clemson	Beautiful Tiger Field • Clemson, SC	L 5–9	41–17	11–8
May 9	at Clemson	Beautiful Tiger Field • Clemson, SC	W 8–3	42–17	12–8
May 13	at Virginia	UVA Baseball Field • Charlottesville, VA	L 0–1	42–18	12–9
May 14	at Virginia	UVA Baseball Field • Charlottesville, VA	W 8–6	43–18	13–9
May 15	at Virginia	UVA Baseball Field • Charlottesville, VA	W 13–1	44–18	14–9

Postseason

ACC Tournament
Date	Opponent	Seed	Site/stadium	Score	Overall record	ACCT Record
May 18	(5) NC State	(4)	Greenville Municipal Stadium • Greenville, SC	L 5–6	45–18	0–1
May 19	(8) Maryland	(4)	Greenville Municipal Stadium • Greenville, SC	W 7–1	45–19	1–1
May 20	(7) Wake Forest	(4)	Greenville Municipal Stadium • Greenville, SC	W 18–3	46–19	2–1
May 21	(1) Clemson	(4)	Greenville Municipal Stadium • Greenville, SC	W 10–4	47–19	3–1
May 21	(5) NC State	(4)	Greenville Municipal Stadium • Greenville, SC	W 7–4	48–19	4–1
May 22	(1) Clemson	(4)	Greenville Municipal Stadium • Greenville, SC	L 1–4	48–20	4–2

NCAA Atlantic II Regional
Date	Opponent	Seed	Site/stadium	Score	Overall record	NCAAT record
May 26	(5) Central Michigan	(2)	Dick Howser Stadium • Tallahassee, FL	W 8–6	49–20	1–0
May 27	(4) Jacksonville	(2)	Dick Howser Stadium • Tallahassee, FL	W 5–1	50–20	2–0
May 28	(4) Jacksonville	(2)	Dick Howser Stadium • Tallahassee, FL	W 5–1	51–20	3–0
May 30	(6) BYU	(2)	Dick Howser Stadium • Tallahassee, FL	W 7–1	52–20	4–0

College World Series
Date	Opponent	Seed	Site/stadium	Score	Overall record	CWS record
June 3	(3) LSU	(6)	Johnny Rosenblatt Stadium • Omaha, NE	W 6–3	53–20	1–0
June 5	(2) Georgia Tech	(6)	Johnny Rosenblatt Stadium • Omaha, NE	L 4–12	53–21	1–1
June 7	(7) Cal State Fullerton	(6)	Johnny Rosenblatt Stadium • Omaha, NE	L 3–10	53–22	1–2
