= Ryan Minor =

American baseball player (1974–2023)

- Third baseman
- Born: January 5, 1974; Canton, Ohio, U.S.
- Died: December 22, 2023 (aged 49); Salisbury, Maryland, U.S.
- Batted: Right Threw: Right

MLB debut
- September 13, 1998, for the Baltimore Orioles

Last MLB appearance
- October 7, 2001, for the Montreal Expos

MLB statistics
- Batting average: .177
- Home runs: 5
- Runs batted in: 27
- Stats at Baseball Reference

Teams
- Baltimore Orioles (1998–2000); Montreal Expos (2001)

Ryan Dale Minor (January 5, 1974 – December 22, 2023) was an American professional baseball third baseman, minor league baseball manager and professional basketball player. He played all or parts of four seasons in Major League Baseball, from 1998 to 2001, with the Baltimore Orioles and Montreal Expos.

In basketball, he earned the Big Eight Conference Men's Basketball Player of the Year award in college playing for Oklahoma Sooners men's basketball. In baseball, he earned ABCA/Rawlings High School All-America Baseball Team in high school, a 1994 College World Series championship in college and is best remembered as the player who started in place of Cal Ripken Jr. to end the ironman streak.

== Basketball career ==
Ryan Minor
Personal information
- Listed height: 6 ft 7 in (2.01 m)
- Listed weight: 220 lb (100 kg)

Career information
- High school: Hammon (Hammon, Oklahoma)
- College: Oklahoma (1992–1996)
- NBA draft: 1996: 2nd round, 32nd overall pick
- Drafted by: Philadelphia 76ers
- Playing career: 1996–1997
- Position: Small forward

Career history
- 1996–1997: Oklahoma City Cavalry

Career highlights
- Third-team All-American – NABC (1996); Third-team All-American – UPI (1995); Big Eight Player of the Year (1995); 2× First-team All-Big Eight (1995, 1996)
- Stats at Basketball Reference

Minor was an All-American college basketball player at the University of Oklahoma. With the Sooners, he twice led the Big Eight Conference in points per game. As a junior in 1995, he was named the Big Eight Player of the Year. Despite being projected as a potential lottery pick after his junior year, Minor elected to return to Oklahoma for his senior season.

Minor was selected in the second round of the 1996 NBA draft by the Philadelphia 76ers. After playing in seven preseason games, including one in which he scored 15 points, Minor was released by the 76ers. He had been blocked at the position by players including Jerry Stackhouse and Clarence Weatherspoon.

After his release from the 76ers, Minor played in 32 games for the Oklahoma City Cavalry of the Continental Basketball Association. In January 1997, he left the team upon receiving an invitation to spring training from the Baltimore Orioles. He had averaged 9.5 points and 4.4 rebounds per game with the Cavalry.

== Baseball career ==
At Hammon High School in Hammon, Oklahoma, in 1992, Minor was named to the ABCA/Rawlings High School All-America Baseball Third Team. He went on to play college baseball for the Oklahoma Sooners. He helped lead the Sooners to a championship as a sophomore in the 1994 College World Series and was named to the All-Tournament Team. Minor was selected in the seventh round of the 1995 MLB draft by the New York Mets but chose not to sign. The following year, he was selected in the 33rd round of the 1996 MLB draft by the Baltimore Orioles.

After playing two-plus seasons in the minor leagues, Minor made his major league debut in 1998. He split the next two seasons between the Orioles and their farm clubs, mostly the Rochester Red Wings. He was the first player to start in front of Cal Ripken Jr. to end Ripken's consecutive-games-played streak. After the 2000 season, he was traded to the Expos for pitcher Jorge Julio. He then split time in the 2001 season between the Expos and the Ottawa Lynx. Overall, Minor played 142 games during his MLB career.

From 2002 until 2004, Minor played with three different organizations, along with stints with the Newark Bears and Atlantic City Surf of the independent Atlantic League of Professional Baseball. He joined the Lancaster Barnstormers for their inaugural 2005 season. He hit the first-ever Barnstormers home run on May 17, 2005, at Clipper Magazine Stadium. With Lancaster, Minor batted .268 with 26 homers (a team best) and 99 RBIs, which were second most on the Barnstormers team and tied for third in the league.

== Coaching and managerial career ==
After Minor retired from professional baseball, he went on to coach the 2006 Road Warriors. In December 2006, Minor became the hitting and infield coach of the York Revolution, also of the Atlantic League of Professional Baseball. In 2008, he started serving in a similar capacity with the Delmarva Shorebirds, the Orioles' class A affiliate in the South Atlantic League. From 2010 to 2012, Minor managed the Class-A Delmarva Shorebirds. In 2013, Minor was promoted to manager of the Advanced-A Frederick Keys. He returned to the Delmarva Shorebirds for four seasons, from 2014 to 2017, before becoming the Frederick Keys manager again for the 2018 season. After the Keys finished 2019 in last place with its worst season since 2004, his contract was not renewed by the Orioles. By January 2020 he had signed on with the Detroit Tigers, where he was set to manage the Gulf Coast League West Tigers in 2020. He received the same assignment for the 2021 season.

== Personal life ==
Minor's twin brother, Damon, was also a Major League Baseball player for the San Francisco Giants. They were teammates at the University of Oklahoma from 1993 to 1995.

In late October 2022, Minor was diagnosed with colon cancer. He entered hospice care in November 2023 and died from the disease on December 22, 2023, at age 49. One month before Minor died, the Oklahoma Sports Hall of Fame announced Minor had been selected as a 2024 inductee.
