= 1994 Arizona State Sun Devils baseball team =

Baseball team

1994 Arizona State Sun Devils baseball

NCAA Mideast Regional champions

College World Series, 2–2
- Conference: Pacific-10 Conference
- Record: 45–18 (20–10 Pac-10)
- Head coach: Jim Brock (24th year)
- Home stadium: Packard Stadium

1994 Pacific-10 Conference baseball standings
	Conf.				Overall
Team	W		L	PCT	W		L	PCT
Northern
Oregon State ^{x}‍‍‍	22	–	8	.733	35	–	19	.648
No. 16 Washington ‍‍‍^{y}	20	–	10	.667	46	–	18	.719
Portland State ‍‍‍	14	–	16	.467	30	–	24	.556
Gonzaga ‍‍‍	13	–	17	.433	29	–	23	.558
Washington State ‍‍‍	11	–	19	.367	35	–	26	.574
Portland ‍‍‍	10	–	20	.333	22	–	33	.400
Southern
No. 13 Stanford ^{x}‍‍‍^{y}	21	–	9	.700	36	–	24	.600
No. 4 Arizona State ‍‍‍^{y}	20	–	10	.667	45	–	18	.714
No. 14 Southern California ‍‍‍^{y}	19	–	11	.633	41	–	20	.672
California ‍‍‍	12	–	18	.400	25	–	35	.417
UCLA ‍‍‍	11	–	19	.367	22	–	36	.379
Arizona ‍‍‍	7	–	23	.233	15	–	40	.273
x – Division champion y – Invited to the NCAA tournament As of June 30, 1994; Rankings from Collegiate Baseball

The 1994 Arizona State Sun Devils baseball team represented Arizona State University in the 1994 NCAA Division I baseball season. The Sun Devils played their home games at Packard Stadium, and played as part of the Pacific-10 Conference. The team was coached by Jim Brock in his twenty-fourth and final season as head coach at Arizona State.

The Sun Devils reached the College World Series, their sixteenth appearance in Omaha, where they finished tied for fourth place after recording two wins against Miami (FL) and losing a pair of games to eventual champion Oklahoma. Brock died three days after Arizona State was eliminated from the College World Series.

== Personnel ==
=== Roster ===
1994 Arizona State Sun Devils roster
Pitchers: - Jason Bond - Freshman; - Mike Corominas - Sophomore; - Travis Gribler - Senior; - Billy Neal - Junior; - Noah Peery - Senior; - Kaipo Spenser - Freshman; Catchers: - Toddy Cady - Junior; - Jake Steinkemper - Sophomore	Infielders: - Randy Betten - Junior; - Todd Delnoce - Senior; - Mike Heidemann - Sophomore; - Bill Koning - Sophomore; - Damon Lembi - Junior; - Jeff Rensmeyer - Junior; - Antone Williamson - Junior; - Cody McKay - Sophomore; Outfielders: - Jacob Cruz - Junior; - John Fullford - Junior; - Billy McGonigle - Senior; - Scott Shores - Senior; - Sean Tyler - Senior	Unknown: - Derek Mickelson; - Jason Ruskey; - Joe Stoddard; - Jason Verdugo; - Eric Vindiola; - Larry Walty

=== Coaches ===
1994 Arizona State Sun Devils baseball coaching staff
- Jim Brock - Head coach - 23rd year

== Schedule and results ==
Legend
Arizona State win
Arizona State loss

1994 Arizona State Sun Devils baseball game log
Regular season

January
Date	Opponent	Site/stadium	Score	Overall record	Pac-10 record
Jan 27	New Mexico State*	Packard Stadium • Tempe, AZ	W 11–2	1–0	
Jan 28	New Mexico State*	Packard Stadium • Tempe, AZ	W 6–5	2–0	
Jan 29	New Mexico State*	Packard Stadium • Tempe, AZ	W 4–3	3–0	

February
Date	Opponent	Site/stadium	Score	Overall record	Pac-10 record
Feb 4	New Mexico*	Packard Stadium • Tempe, AZ	W 20–6	4–0	
Feb 5	New Mexico*	Packard Stadium • Tempe, AZ	W 10–7	5–0	
Feb 6	New Mexico*	Packard Stadium • Tempe, AZ	L 5–6	5–1	
Feb 9	Southern Utah*	Packard Stadium • Tempe, AZ	W 22–5	6–1	
Feb 9	Southern Utah*	Packard Stadium • Tempe, AZ	W 14–3	7–1	
Feb 11	at Florida State*	Dick Howser Stadium • Tallahassee, FL	L 7–9	7–2	
Feb 12	at Florida State*	Dick Howser Stadium • Tallahassee, FL	L 2–13	7–3	
Feb 13	at Florida State*	Dick Howser Stadium • Tallahassee, FL	L 8–9	7–4	
Feb 18	Southern California	Packard Stadium • Tempe, AZ	W 6–2	8–4	1–0
Feb 19	Southern California	Packard Stadium • Tempe, AZ	L 4–11	8–5	1–1
Feb 20	Southern California	Packard Stadium • Tempe, AZ	W 8–5	9–5	2–1
Feb 23	Utah*	Packard Stadium • Tempe, AZ	W 17–3	10–5	
Feb 25	at Stanford	Sunken Diamond • Stanford, CA	W 5–4^{14}	11–5	3–1
Feb 27	at Stanford	Sunken Diamond • Stanford, CA	L 1–11	11–6	3–2
Feb 27	at Stanford	Sunken Diamond • Stanford, CA	L 1–4	11–7	3–3

March
Date	Opponent	Site/stadium	Score	Overall record	Pac-10 record
Mar 4	at Minnesota*	Hubert H. Humphrey Metrodome • Minneapolis, MN	L 5–14	11–8	
Mar 5	vs Ohio State*	Hubert H. Humphrey Metrodome • Minneapolis, MN	W 9–6^{10}	12–8	
Mar 6	vs Arizona*	Hubert H. Humphrey Metrodome • Minneapolis, MN	W 12–4	13–8	
Mar 8	BYU*	Packard Stadium • Tempe, AZ	W 6–4	14–8	
Mar 9	BYU*	Packard Stadium • Tempe, AZ	W 18–6	15–8	
Mar 11	Arizona	Packard Stadium • Tempe, AZ	W 16–6	16–8	4–3
Mar 12	at Arizona	Frank Sancet Stadium • Tucson, AZ	W 7–5^{10}	17–8	5–3
Mar 13	at Arizona	Frank Sancet Stadium • Tucson, AZ	L 7–8	17–9	5–4
Mar 15	UNLV*	Packard Stadium • Tempe, AZ	W 10–2	18–9	
Mar 16	UNLV*	Packard Stadium • Tempe, AZ	W 6–0	19–9	
Mar 18	Michigan*	Packard Stadium • Tempe, AZ	W 8–0	20–9	
Mar 19	Michigan*	Packard Stadium • Tempe, AZ	W 8–1	21–9	
Mar 20	Michigan*	Packard Stadium • Tempe, AZ	W 12–4	22–9	
Mar 26	California	Packard Stadium • Tempe, AZ	W 6–2	23–9	6–4
Mar 26	California	Packard Stadium • Tempe, AZ	L 1–4	23–10	6–5
Mar 27	California	Packard Stadium • Tempe, AZ	W 8–6	24–10	7–5
Mar 31	at UCLA	Jackie Robinson Stadium • Los Angeles, CA	W 6–5	25–10	8–5

April
Date	Opponent	Site/stadium	Score	Overall record	Pac-10 record
Apr 1	at UCLA	Jackie Robinson Stadium • Los Angeles, CA	W 5–3	26–10	9–5
Apr 2	at UCLA	Jackie Robinson Stadium • Los Angeles, CA	W 8–6	27–10	10–5
Apr 5	Grand Canyon*	Packard Stadium • Tempe, AZ	W 9–5	28–10	
Apr 8	at Arizona	Frank Sancet Stadium • Tucson, AZ	L 2–8	28–11	10–6
Apr 9	Arizona	Packard Stadium • Tempe, AZ	W 4–2	29–11	11–6
Apr 10	Arizona	Packard Stadium • Tempe, AZ	W 15–4	30–11	12–6
Apr 12	at Grand Canyon*	Brazell Stadium • Phoenix, AZ	L 0–5	30–12	
Apr 15	at Southern California	Dedeaux Field • Los Angeles, CA	L 0–9	30–13	12–7
Apr 16	at Southern California	Dedeaux Field • Los Angeles, CA	W 12–5	31–13	13–7
Apr 17	at Southern California	Dedeaux Field • Los Angeles, CA	L 7–8	31–14	13–8
Apr 19	Grand Canyon*	Packard Stadium • Tempe, AZ	W 19–4	32–14	
Apr 22	at California	Evans Diamond • Berkeley, CA	W 11–1	33–14	14–8
Apr 24	at California	Evans Diamond • Berkeley, CA	W 12–2	34–14	15–8
Apr 24	at California	Evans Diamond • Berkeley, CA	W 8–7	35–14	16–8
Apr 29	UCLA	Packard Stadium • Tempe, AZ	W 9–3	36–14	17–8
Apr 30	UCLA	Packard Stadium • Tempe, AZ	W 8–2	37–14	18–8

May
Date	Opponent	Site/stadium	Score	Overall record	Pac-10 record
May 1	UCLA	Packard Stadium • Tempe, AZ	L 8–15	37–15	18–9
May 13	Stanford	Packard Stadium • Tempe, AZ	W 8–4	38–15	19–9
May 14	Stanford	Packard Stadium • Tempe, AZ	W 5–4	39–15	20–9
May 15	Stanford	Packard Stadium • Tempe, AZ	L 5–7	39–16	20–10

Postseason

NCAA Mideast Regional
Date	Opponent	Seed	Site/stadium	Score	Overall record	Reg Record
May 27	(4) Western Carolina	(3)	Lindsey Nelson Stadium • Knoxville, TN	W 8–6	40–16	1–0
May 28	(5) Wright State	(3)	Lindsey Nelson Stadium • Knoxville, TN	W 7–4	41–16	2–0
May 29	(1) Tennessee	(3)	Lindsey Nelson Stadium • Knoxville, TN	W 10–5	42–16	3–0
May 30	(1) Tennessee	(3)	Lindsey Nelson Stadium • Knoxville, TN	W 5–4	43–16	4–0

College World Series
Date	Opponent	Seed	Site/stadium	Score	Overall record	CWS record
June 3	(1) Miami (FL)	(8)	Johnny Rosenblatt Stadium • Omaha, NE	W 4–0	44–16	1–0
June 6	(4) Oklahoma	(8)	Johnny Rosenblatt Stadium • Omaha, NE	L 3–4^{11}	44–17	1–1
June 7	(1) Miami (FL)	(8)	Johnny Rosenblatt Stadium • Omaha, NE	W 9–5	45–17	2–1
June 9	(4) Oklahoma	(8)	Johnny Rosenblatt Stadium • Omaha, NE	L 1–6	45–18	2–2
