= Brad Rigby =

American baseball player (born 1973)

- Pitcher
- Born: May 14, 1973 (age 51); Milwaukee, Wisconsin, U.S.
- Batted: Right Threw: Right

MLB debut
- June 28, 1997, for the Oakland Athletics

Last MLB appearance
- June 24, 2000, for the Montreal Expos

MLB statistics
- Win–loss record: 5–13
- Earned run average: 5.50
- Strikeouts: 75
- Stats at Baseball Reference

Teams
- Oakland Athletics (1997, 1999); Kansas City Royals (1999–2000); Montreal Expos (2000)

Bradley Kenneth Rigby (born May 14, 1973) is an American former professional baseball pitcher. He played in Major League Baseball (MLB) from 1997 to 2000 for the Oakland Athletics, Kansas City Royals, and Montreal Expos.

== College career ==
Rigby attended Georgia Tech, and in 1992 he played collegiate summer baseball with the Orleans Cardinals of the Cape Cod Baseball League. He was part of the 1994 Georgia Tech Yellow Jackets baseball team that was the runner-up in the 1994 College World Series. Rigby was named to the All-Tournament team.

== Professional career ==
Rigby was drafted by the Oakland Athletics in the 1994 Amateur Draft. He made his first MLB appearance in 1997.
