= Damon Minor =

American baseball player and coach (born 1974)

- First baseman / Coach
- Born: January 5, 1974 (age 52); Canton, Ohio, U.S.
- Batted: Left Threw: Left

Professional debut
- MLB: September 2, 2000, for the San Francisco Giants
- NPB: April 27, 2005, for the Tohoku Rakuten Golden Eagles

Last appearance
- MLB: June 24, 2004, for the San Francisco Giants
- NPB: May 4, 2005, for the Tohoku Rakuten Golden Eagles

MLB statistics
- Batting average: .232
- Home runs: 13
- Runs batted in: 39

NPB statistics
- Batting average: .200
- Home runs: 0
- Runs batted in: 2
- Stats at Baseball Reference

Teams
- As player: San Francisco Giants (2000–2002, 2004); Tohoku Rakuten Golden Eagles (2005); As coach: San Francisco Giants (2025)

Damon Reed Minor (born January 5, 1974) is an American professional baseball coach who most recently served as the assistant hitting coach for the San Francisco Giants of Major League Baseball (MLB). As a former first baseman, he played in MLB for the Giants, and in Nippon Professional Baseball (NPB) for the Tohoku Rakuten Golden Eagles.

Given the nickname "Tiny" by Barry Bonds because of his large frame, 6' 7" 230 lbs, Minor is currently a co-owner of Minor-Foral Baseball Academy, where he gives hitting lessons and coaches prep summer showcase teams.

== College career ==
Minor played four years of baseball at the University of Oklahoma from 1993 to 1996 as the designated hitter and was a three-year starter. He helped his team win the 1994 National Championship and made it back to the College World Series in 1995. His best season came in 1996, when he batted .348 with 14 home runs and 62 RBI and was named an All-American Honorable Mention.

== Professional career ==
=== San Francisco Giants ===
Minor was drafted by the San Francisco Giants in the 12th round of the 1996 Major League Baseball draft. He started his minor league career in 1996 with the Low-A Bellingham Giants. He had one of his best years in 1997 with the High-A Bakersfield Blaze; he hit .289 with 31 home runs and 99 RBI. Minor split 1998 between the High-A San Jose Giants and the Double-A Shreveport Captains. In 1999, again with Shreveport, he hit 20 home runs and had 82 RBI.

2000 was Minor's career year. With the Triple-A Fresno Grizzlies, he hit .290 with 30 home runs and 102 RBI, which was good enough for a September call-up to the Giants. Minor made his major league debut on September 2, 2000, and appeared in 10 games for San Francisco during his rookie campaign. In 2001, he was again good as he hit .308 with 24 home runs and 71 RBI and was twice promoted to the majors. In 2002, he played only 9 games in the minors as he spent time in the majors and on the disabled list. Minor made 83 appearances for the Giants, and hit .237 with 10 home runs and 24 RBI.

=== Philadelphia Phillies ===
Minor struggled to begin 2003 and on May 19, he was traded to the Philadelphia Phillies in exchange for minor leaguer Mike Wilson. Minor spent the rest of the year with the Phillies' Triple-A team, the Scranton/Wilkes-Barre Red Barons. He became a free agent at the end of the season. During the offseason, Minor had laser eye surgery and lost 30 pounds.

=== San Francisco Giants (second stint) ===
On February 6, 2004, he re-signed with the Giants. He hit .302 for Fresno and again saw time in the majors. Minor appeared in 24 games for the Giants in 2004. and became a free agent after the season.

On November 17, 2004, he signed with the Pittsburgh Pirates, but was released just one month later before the season began.

=== Tohoku Rakuten Golden Eagles ===
In 2005, Minor signed with the Tohoku Rakuten Golden Eagles of Japan's Nippon Professional Baseball, but was limited to six games because of injuries.

== Post-playing career ==
In 2007, Minor became a volunteer coach for his alma mater, the University of Oklahoma to help with their hitting. He currently resides in Edmond, Oklahoma. He co-owns a baseball academy and coaches a prep team.

On December 5, 2024, Minor was hired to serve as an assistant hitting coach for the San Francisco Giants. On November 8, 2025, it was announced that Minor would not return to the team in 2026.

On February 18, 2026, Minor was announced as a hitting coach for the Iowa Cubs, the Triple-A affiliate of the Chicago Cubs.

== Personal life ==
Minor's twin brother, Ryan, was also a Major League Baseball player for the Baltimore Orioles and Montreal Expos. They were teammates at Oklahoma from 1993 to 1995.
