= Jacob Cruz =

American baseball player & coach (born 1973)

- Outfielder / Coach
- Born: January 28, 1973 (age 53); Oxnard, California, U.S.
- Batted: Left Threw: Left

Professional debut
- MLB: July 18, 1996, for the San Francisco Giants
- KBO: April 6, 2007, for the Hanwha Eagles
- CPBL: July 28, 2009, for the La New Bears

Last appearance
- MLB: October 2, 2005, for the Cincinnati Reds
- KBO: May 20, 2008, for the Samsung Lions
- CPBL: July 28, 2009, for the La New Bears

MLB statistics
- Batting average: .241
- Home runs: 19
- Runs batted in: 105

KBO statistics
- Batting average: .310
- Home runs: 24
- Runs batted in: 106

CPBL statistics
- Batting average: .323
- Home runs: 6
- Runs batted in: 28
- Stats at Baseball Reference

Teams
- As player: San Francisco Giants (1996–1998); Cleveland Indians (1998–2001); Colorado Rockies (2001); Detroit Tigers (2002); Cincinnati Reds (2004–2005); Hanwha Eagles (2007); Samsung Lions (2008); La New Bears (2009); As coach: Pittsburgh Pirates (2019); Milwaukee Brewers (2020–2021)
Medals
Men's baseball
Representing United States
World Junior Baseball Championship
Bronze medal – third place	1991 Brandon	Team

Jacob Cruz (born January 28, 1973), is an American professional baseball former outfielder and current coach. He is an assistant hitting coach for the San Francisco Giants of Major League Baseball (MLB) and previously played professionally in South Korea and Mexico.

== College ==
Cruz was drafted straight out of high school in 1991 by the California Angels, but did not sign; instead, choosing to play baseball for Arizona State University. Cruz was drafted in the 1st round (32nd overall) of the 1994 Major League Baseball draft by the San Francisco Giants, signing the next month.

== Major League Baseball ==
Cruz would make his Major League debut on July 18, 1996. Cruz spent most of 1996 and 1997 in the Giants minor league system and after playing for the Giants Triple-A affiliate, the Fresno Grizzlies, for most of the 1998 season, was traded to the Cleveland Indians on July 23, 1998, along with Steve Reed, for Shawon Dunston, José Mesa, and Alvin Morman. Cruz would play one game for the Indians in 1998 and would spend the rest of the year playing for the Buffalo Bisons, the Indians' Triple-A affiliate. On June 2, 2001, the Indians traded Cruz to the Colorado Rockies for Jody Gerut and Josh Bard. Cruz would play 44 games for the Rockies and 20 for their Triple-A affiliate, the Colorado Springs Sky Sox, before being released by the Rockies on November 30, 2001.

On December 21, 2001, Cruz signed with the Detroit Tigers. Cruz played 35 games for the Tigers and was released on October 3, 2002. On December 27, 2002, Cruz signed with the Cincinnati Reds. He would spend the next three years in the Reds organization, including appearing in a career-high 110 games in 2005. Released by the Reds on April 14, 2006, Cruz signed a minor league contract with the New York Mets on May 30, 2006. Cruz played 55 games for the Mets Triple-A affiliate, the Norfolk Tides, the rest of the year and was granted free agency at the end of the season.

== Korea ==
Before the start of the 2007 season, Cruz signed a contract with the Hanwha Eagles of the Korea Baseball Organization. Cruz had an excellent season with the Eagles, hitting .321 with 22 home runs and 85 RBI. Before the start of the 2008 season, Cruz signed with the Samsung Lions. Cruz was cut by the Lions on May 23, 2008.

== Mexico ==
After his release from the Lions, Cruz signed to play for the Potros de Tijuana of the Mexican Baseball League for the 2008 season. In 2009, he played for the Dorados de Chihuahua.

== American Association ==
On August 9, 2010, Cruz was signed by the Sioux City Explorers of the American Association and batted .400 in 80 at-bats. He also hit 4 home runs and had 26 RBI.

== Coaching career ==
On December 13, 2010, the Arizona Diamondbacks hired Cruz to be the Hitting Coach of the Yakima Bears, the Diamondbacks Short Season Class A team. On November 22, 2011, Cruz was promoted to Hitting Coach of the Visalia Rawhide, the Diamondbacks Advanced Class A team. Cruz was the hitting coach for the Tennessee Smokies in 2017 and 2018. Cruz then served as the Pittsburgh Pirates assistant hitting coach for the 2019 season. Cruz was hired as the assistant hitting coach for the Milwaukee Brewers prior to the 2020 season. Cruz was permitted to speak to other teams following the conclusion of the Brewers' 2021 season.

== Personal life ==
Cruz is of Mexican descent.
