= Jay Payton =

American baseball player (born 1972)

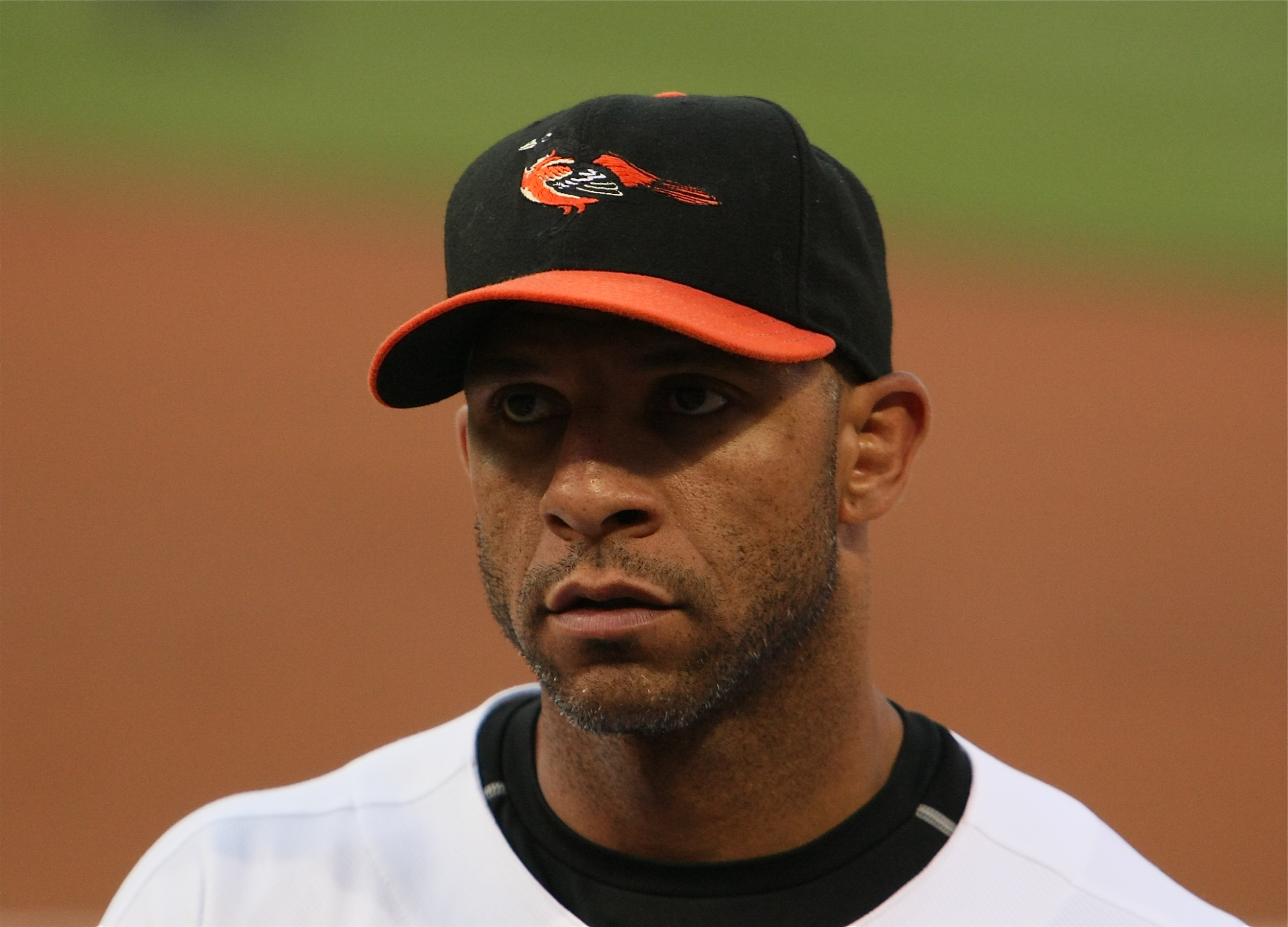
- Payton with the Baltimore Orioles
- Outfielder
- Born: November 22, 1972 (age 53); Zanesville, Ohio, U.S.
- Batted: Right Threw: Right

MLB debut
- September 1, 1998, for the New York Mets

Last MLB appearance
- October 3, 2010, for the Colorado Rockies

MLB statistics
- Batting average: .279
- Home runs: 119
- Runs batted in: 522
- Stats at Baseball Reference

Teams
- New York Mets (1998–2002); Colorado Rockies (2002–2003); San Diego Padres (2004); Boston Red Sox (2005); Oakland Athletics (2005–2006); Baltimore Orioles (2007–2008); Colorado Rockies (2010)

Jason Lee "Jay" Payton (born November 22, 1972) is an American former Major League Baseball (MLB) outfielder who played for the New York Mets (1998-2002), Colorado Rockies (2002-2003, 2010), San Diego Padres (2004), Boston Red Sox (2005), Oakland Athletics (2005-2006) and Baltimore Orioles (2007-2008). He batted and threw right-handed. Payton was an opposite-field hitter with some power. He had great speed as a runner, but did not steal many bases. Defensively, he was a solid outfielder with an above-average arm, and his quickness getting rid of the ball helped him hold baserunners on the base paths. He is currently serving as an in game analyst with ESPNU for college baseball.

== Pre-professional career ==
Payton attended Zanesville High School in Zanesville, Ohio, and starred in soccer, basketball, and baseball. He was also an excellent student and graduated fourth in his class. While in Zanesville, Payton played for the Junior Pioneers. After his senior year, he helped lead the Midland Redskins of Cincinnati to the Connie Mack World Series Title, where he was named MVP of the tournament. That exposure helped lead to a full ride scholarship to Georgia Tech, where he would team up with future Major League All Stars Nomar Garciaparra and Jason Varitek to help lead Georgia Tech to their first ever College World Series appearance in school history. The Yellow Jackets came up short losing to Oklahoma in the 1994 championship game. In 1992 and 1993, he played collegiate summer baseball for the Orleans Cardinals of the Cape Cod Baseball League, where he teamed up with Garciaparra in 1993 to lead Orleans to the league championship.

== Baseball career ==
=== New York Mets (1994–2002) ===
Selected by the Mets in the first round (29th overall) of the 1994 MLB draft, Payton hadn't fulfilled the great expectations he projected at Georgia Tech when he was drafted in the first round with fellow All Americans and Teammates Nomar Garciaparra and Jason Varitek, due in large part to four surgeries while in the minor leagues. Payton had three elbow surgeries, two of which were Tommy John, and surgery on his left shoulder. He spent the better part of his first five years on and off the DL while rehabbing from surgeries. He made his debut in 1998 after finally battling through all the elbow troubles. He helped lead the Mets to a World Series berth as the starting CF in 2000, his official rookie year, in which he finished third in the rookie of the year voting. In Game 2 of the World Series, Payton hit a dramatic three-run home run against Mariano Rivera in the ninth inning, the second and last postseason home run Rivera gave up in his career.

=== Colorado Rockies (2002–2003) ===
With limited duty in 2001 due to a torn hamstring early in the season, the Mets explored trading Payton. On July 31, 2002, Payton was traded to the Colorado Rockies along with pitcher Mark Corey and minor league outfielder Robert Stratton in exchange for pitchers John Thomson and Steve Reed. In 2003, Payton enjoyed his most productive season with career highs in home runs (28), RBI (89), runs (93), hits (181), doubles (32), on-base percentage (.354), slugging average (.512), at bats (600) and games played (157), and added a respectable .302 batting average.

=== San Diego Padres (2004) ===
On January 13, 2004, Payton signed a two-year, $5.5 million contract with the San Diego Padres, becoming the team's starting center fielder. He had a subpar 2004 season, batting .260 with eight homers and 55 RBI in 143 games.

=== Boston Red Sox (2005) ===
On December 20, 2004, Payton was traded to the Boston Red Sox along with infielder Ramón Vázquez, minor league pitcher David Pauley and cash considerations in exchange for Dave Roberts. Payton took over Roberts' role as the team's fourth outfielder. Payton was designated for assignment by the Red Sox on July 7, 2005, after being publicly disgruntled over his lack of playing time. At the time, he was batting .263 with five home runs and 21 RBI in 55 games.

=== Oakland Athletics (2005–2006) ===
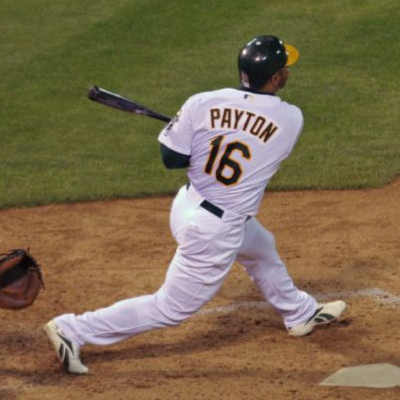
Payton batting for the Athletics on April 3, 2006

On July 13, 2005, Payton was traded to the Oakland Athletics for pitcher Chad Bradford. On July 15, Payton hit a home run in his first at bat with the A's, and earned a cult status for a brief period after winning many games for the A's with an otherwise struggling offense. In 2006, Payton played regularly in the outfield for the Athletics while batting .296 with 10 home runs and 59 RBI in 142 games. On July 3, 2006, he hit his 100th career home run against the Detroit Tigers.

=== Baltimore Orioles (2007–2008) ===
On December 11, 2006, Payton agreed to terms on a two-year, $9.75 million contract with the Baltimore Orioles. After becoming a free agent during the 2008–09 offseason, Payton suffered a shoulder injury while lifting weights in March 2009. He did not play during the 2009 season.

=== Second stint with Colorado Rockies (2010) ===
On January 20, 2010, Payton signed a minor league contract with his former team, the Colorado Rockies. Payton was called up to the Rockies active roster in September after spending most of the season with the Rockies minor league affiliate, the Triple-A Colorado Springs Sky Sox. He hit .343 with an RBI in 20 games. He retired in February 2011.

=== Career statistics ===
In 1,259 games over 12 seasons, Payton posted a .279 batting average (1,157-for-4,154) with 561 runs, 193 doubles, 30 triples, 119 home runs, 522 RBI, 47 stolen bases, 255 bases on balls, .323 on-base percentage and .425 slugging percentage. He finished his career with a .987 fielding percentage playing at all three outfield positions. In 21 postseason games, he hit .253 (21-for-83) with nine runs, three home runs and 10 RBI.
