= Chip Glass =

American baseball player (born 1971)

- Outfielder
- Born: June 24, 1971 (age 55); Willits, California
- Bats: Left Throws: Left
- Stats at Baseball Reference

Career highlights and awards
- College World Series champion (1994); College World Series Most Outstanding Player (1994)

David Jay "Chip" Glass (born June 24, 1971, in Willits, California) is a former baseball outfielder who is most notable for winning the 1994 College World Series Most Outstanding Player award while a senior at University of Oklahoma.

In 1993 with Oklahoma, he hit .323 with 23 stolen bases. In 1994 with them, he hit .339 with 27 stolen bases.

Glass was drafted by the Cleveland Indians in the 37th round of the 1994 draft and played professionally until 2000, however he never reached the big leagues.

He began his professional career with the Watertown Indians, hitting .308 with two home runs in 237 at-bats. In 1995, he played for the Columbus Red Stixx, hitting .289 with 37 stolen bases in 115 games. With the Kinston Indians in 1996, he hit .267 with five home runs and 11 stolen bases in 479 at-bats. In 1997, he played for the Akron Aeros, hitting .259 with five home runs and 16 stolen bases in 113 games.

He played in the New York Yankees organization in 1998 and 1999. In 128 games in 1998, he hit .280 with four home runs and 15 stolen bases, splitting time between the Norwich Navigators and Columbus Clippers. He again split the 1999 season between those two teams, hitting .261 with eight home runs and 10 stolen bases in 118 games.

Glass ended his professional career with the Newark Bears in 2000, hitting .267 in 86 at-bats with them.
