= Antone Williamson =

American baseball player (born 1973)

- First baseman
- Born: July 18, 1973 (age 53); Harbor City, California, U.S.
- Batted: Left Threw: Right

MLB debut
- May 31, 1997, for the Milwaukee Brewers

Last MLB appearance
- July 3, 1997, for the Milwaukee Brewers

MLB statistics
- Batting average: .204
- Home runs: 0
- Runs batted in: 6
- Stats at Baseball Reference

Teams
- Milwaukee Brewers (1997)

Anthony Joseph "Antone" Williamson (born July 18, 1973) is an American former Major League Baseball (MLB) first baseman who played for the Milwaukee Brewers in 1997.

== Amateur career ==
Williamson attended Arizona State University, and in 1992 he played collegiate summer baseball with the Harwich Mariners of the Cape Cod Baseball League.

== Professional career ==
Williamson was a first-round draft pick (fourth overall) by the Milwaukee Brewers in the 1994 MLB draft. He played minor league baseball for most of his career, and had a .271 batting average, and 415 hits in his six-year minor-league career.

Williamson's only Major League action came in a 24-game stint in 1997 for the Brewers. In those 24 games, he recorded a .204 average. He played first base, and occasionally pinch-hit. He left affiliated baseball in 2000 to play for the independent Greenville Bluesmen of the Texas–Louisiana League, after which he retired.

== See also ==
- 1993 College Baseball All-America Team
