= Russ Johnson =

American baseball player (born 1973)

- Infielder
- Born: February 22, 1973 (age 53); Baton Rouge, Louisiana, U.S.
- Batted: Right Threw: Right

MLB debut
- April 8, 1997, for the Houston Astros

Last MLB appearance
- July 15, 2005, for the New York Yankees

MLB statistics
- Batting average: .264
- Home runs: 14
- Runs batted in: 97
- Stats at Baseball Reference

Teams
- Houston Astros (1997–2000); Tampa Bay Devil Rays (2000–2002); New York Yankees (2005)

William Russell Johnson (born February 22, 1973) is an American former Major League Baseball infielder. He prepped at Denham Springs High School then went to Louisiana State University. He was drafted in the first round of the 1994 Major League Baseball draft by the Houston Astros. In 1997, he was called up to the majors by the Astros, where he remained until 2000. His best season in Houston was 1999, when he hit .282 with four home runs and 33 RBI.

== Tampa Bay Devil Rays ==
In the middle of the 2000 season, Johnson was traded to the Tampa Bay Devil Rays for reliever Marc Valdes. He moved around several times during the next few years. With minor leaguer Josh Pressley, he was supplied by the Devil Rays in 2002 to the New York Mets as a PTBNL in a deal for Rey Ordóñez. He spent 2003 and 2004 in the minor leagues with the Mets' and Cubs' Triple-A teams respectively.

== Return to Majors ==
He reached the majors again in 2005, when he signed as a free agent with the New York Yankees. He spent the year coming in off the bench as a first baseman, third baseman, pinch hitter, designated hitter, or outfielder. This made him the second "William Russell Johnson" to play for the Yankees. (Billy Johnson, who has the same first, middle, and last name, but is no relation, played for New York in the 1940s.)

In 2006, he played for the Yankees Triple-A team, and led the International League in walk percentage (14.8%). He spent 2007 in the Pittsburgh Pirates organization, where he hit a combined .261 in 106 games split between Double-A and Triple-A.
