= 1994 Major League Baseball draft =

Baseball draft of amateur players

General information
- Date(s): June 1994

Overview
- First selection: Paul Wilson; New York Mets

The 1994 Major League Baseball draft took place in June 1994. The draft saw the New York Mets select Paul Wilson first overall.

== First round selections ==
The following are the first round picks in the 1994 Major League Baseball draft.

= All-Star	= Baseball Hall of Famer

Pick	Player	Team	Position	School
1	Paul Wilson	New York Mets	P	Florida State
2	Ben Grieve	Oakland Athletics	OF	Martin High School (TX)
3	Dustin Hermanson	San Diego Padres	P	Kent State
4	Antone Williamson	Milwaukee Brewers	3B	Arizona State
5	Josh Booty	Florida Marlins	SS	Evangel Christian Academy (LA)
6	McKay Christensen	California Angels	OF	Clovis West High School (CA)
7	Doug Million	Colorado Rockies	P	Sarasota High School (FL)
8	Todd Walker	Minnesota Twins	2B	LSU
9	C. J. Nitkowski	Cincinnati Reds	P	St. John's
10	Jaret Wright	Cleveland Indians	P	Katella High School (CA)
11	Mark Farris	Pittsburgh Pirates	SS	Angleton High School (TX)
12	Nomar Garciaparra	Boston Red Sox	SS	Georgia Tech
13	Paul Konerko	Los Angeles Dodgers	C	Chaparral High School (AZ)
14	Jason Varitek	Seattle Mariners	C	Georgia Tech
15	Jayson Peterson	Chicago Cubs	P	East High School (CO)
16	Matt Smith	Kansas City Royals	P/1B	Grants Pass High School (OR)
17	Ramón Castro	Houston Astros	C	Lino Padron Rivera High School (PR)
18	Cade Gaspar	Detroit Tigers	P	Pepperdine
19	Bret Wagner	St. Louis Cardinals	P/OF	Wake Forest
20	Terrence Long	New York Mets (Note: Compensation pick from Baltimore Orioles for signing free agent Sid Fernandez)	1B/OF	Stanhope Elmore High School (AL)
21	Hiram Bocachica	Montreal Expos	SS	Rexville Superior School (PR)
22	Dante Powell	San Francisco Giants (Note: Compensation pick from Texas Rangers for signing free agent Will Clark)	OF	Cal State Fullerton
23	Carlton Loewer	Philadelphia Phillies	P	Mississippi State
24	Brian Buchanan	New York Yankees	1B/OF	Virginia
25	Scott Elarton	Houston Astros (Note: Compensation pick from San Francisco Giants for signing free agent Mark Portugal)	P/1B	Lamar High School (CO)
26	Mark Johnson	Chicago White Sox	1B	Warner Robins High School (GA)
27	Jacob Shumate	Atlanta Braves	P	Hartsville High School (SC)
28	Kevin Witt	Toronto Blue Jays	SS	Bishop Kenny High School (FL)

== Supplemental first round selections ==
Pick	Player	Team	Position	School
29	Jay Payton	New York Mets (Note: Supplemental pick for loss of free agent Sid Fernandez)	OF	Georgia Tech
30	Russ Johnson	Houston Astros (Note: Supplemental pick for loss of free agent Mark Portugal)	SS/3B	LSU
31	Mike Thurman	Montreal Expos (Note: Supplemental pick for loss of free agent Dennis Martínez)	P	Oregon State
32	Jacob Cruz	San Francisco Giants (Note: Supplemental pick for loss of free agent Will Clark)	OF	Arizona State
33	Chris Clemons	Chicago White Sox (Note: Supplemental pick for loss of free agent Ellis Burks)	P	Texas A&M
34	Travis Miller	Minnesota Twins (Note: Supplemental pick for failure to sign 1993 first-round selection Jason Varitek)	P	Kent State

== Other notable players ==
- Troy Glaus, 2nd round, 37th overall by the San Diego Padres, but did not sign
- Brian Meadows, 3rd round, 70th overall by the Florida Marlins
- A. J. Pierzynski, 3rd round, 71st overall by the Minnesota Twins
- Aaron Boone, 3rd round, 72nd overall by the Cincinnati Reds
- Brian Rose, 3rd round, 75th overall by the Boston Red Sox
- Scott Podsednik, 3rd round, 85th overall by the Texas Rangers
- Danny Graves, 4th round, 101st overall by the Cleveland Indians
- Tim Byrdak, 5th round, 135th overall by the Kansas City Royals
- Javier Vázquez, 5th round, 140th overall by the Montreal Expos
- Bob Howry, 5th round, 144th overall by the San Francisco Giants
- Emil Brown, 6th round, 149th overall by the Oakland Athletics
- Jason Dickson, 6th round, 153rd overall by the California Angels
- Joe Mays, 6th round, 161st overall by the Seattle Mariners
- Russell Branyan, 7th round, 185th overall by the Cleveland Indians
- Geoff Blum, 7th round, 196th overall by the Montreal Expos
- Ronnie Belliard, 8th round, 207th overall by the Milwaukee Brewers
- Keith Foulke, 9th round, 256th overall by the San Francisco Giants
- Wes Helms, 10th round, 286th overall by the Atlanta Braves
- David Dellucci, 11th round, 295th overall by the Minnesota Twins, but did not sign
- Bubba Trammell, 11th round, 305th overall by the Detroit Tigers
- Scott Downs, 12th round, 342nd overall by the Atlanta Braves, but did not sign
- Carl Pavano, 13th round, 355th overall by the Boston Red Sox
- Daryle Ward, 15th round, 417th overall by the Detroit Tigers
- Mike Holtz, 17th round, 461st overall by the California Angels
- Plácido Polanco, 19th round, 530th overall by the St. Louis Cardinals
- Dustan Mohr, 20th round, 545th overall by the California Angels, but did not sign
- Brett Tomko, 20th round, 552nd overall by the Los Angeles Dodgers, but did not sign
- J. D. Drew, 20th round, 564th overall by the San Francisco Giants, but did not sign
- Scott Sauerbeck, 23rd round, 624th overall by the New York Mets
- John Halama, 23rd round, 640th overall by the Houston Astros
- Jason Grilli, 24th round, 675th overall by the New York Yankees, but did not sign
- Randy Wolf, 25th round, 692nd overall by the Los Angeles Dodgers, but did not sign
- Michael Young, 25th round, 699th overall by the Baltimore Orioles, but did not sign
- Corey Koskie, 26th round, 715th overall by the Minnesota Twins
- Dave Roberts, 28th round, 781st overall by the Detroit Tigers
- Éric Gagné, 30th round, 845th overall by the Chicago White Sox, but did not sign
- Mark Hendrickson, 32nd round, 902nd overall by the Atlanta Braves, but did not sign
- Chad Bradford, 34th round, 957th overall by the Chicago White Sox, but did not sign
- Tim Hudson, 35th round, 961st overall by the Oakland Athletics, but did not sign
- Mike Lincoln, 37th round, 1040th overall by the San Francisco Giants, but did not sign
- Eric Byrnes, 38th round, 1056th overall by the Los Angeles Dodgers, but did not sign
- Brian Lawrence, 39th round, 1079th overall by the Minnesota Twins, but did not sign
- Julio Lugo, 43rd round, 1193rd overall by the Houston Astros
- Kyle Farnsworth, 47th round, 1290th overall by the Chicago Cubs
- Jason Michaels, 49th round, 1323rd overall by the San Diego Padres, but did not sign
- Jim Parque, 50th round, 1349th overall by the Los Angeles Dodgers, but did not sign
- Morgan Ensberg, 61st round, 1534th overall by the Seattle Mariners, but did not sign
- José Santiago, 70th round, 1627th overall by the Kansas City Royals
- Johnny Estrada, 71st round, 1636th overall by the Houston Astros, but did not sign

=== CFL/NBA/NFL/NHL players drafted ===
- Trajan Langdon, 6th round, 150th overall by the San Diego Padres
- Shawn Knight, 13th round, 346th overall by the San Diego Padres
- Frank Sanders, 14th round, 385th overall by the Seattle Mariners, but did not sign
- Charlie Ward, 18th round, 507th overall by the New York Yankees, but did not sign
- Matt Herr, 29th round, 818th overall by the Atlanta Braves, but did not sign
- Kerry Collins, 48th round, 1321st overall by the Toronto Blue Jays, but did not sign
- D'Wayne Bates, 53rd round, 1420th overall by the Toronto Blue Jays, but did not sign
- Eric Montross, 62nd round, 1547th overall by the Chicago Cubs, but did not sign
- Glenn Foley, 72nd round, 1639th overall by the Florida Marlins, but did not sign
- Hines Ward, 73rd round, 1646th overall by the Florida Marlins, but did not sign

Preceded by Alex Rodriguez	1st Overall Picks; Paul Wilson	Succeeded by Darin Erstad
