= Dante Powell =

American baseball player (born 1973)

- Outfielder
- Born: August 25, 1973 (age 52); Long Beach, California, U.S.
- Batted: Right Threw: Right

MLB debut
- April 15, 1997, for the San Francisco Giants

Last MLB appearance
- October 7, 2001, for the San Francisco Giants

MLB statistics
- Batting average: .270
- Home runs: 2
- Runs batted in: 5
- Stats at Baseball Reference

Teams
- San Francisco Giants (1997–1998); Arizona Diamondbacks (1999); San Francisco Giants (2001)

LeJon Dante Powell (born August 25, 1973) is an American former professional baseball outfielder. He played in Major League Baseball (MLB) for the San Francisco Giants (1997–1998, 2001) and Arizona Diamondbacks (1999).
