= 1993 NCAA Division I baseball season =

Baseball season

- Number of teams: 274

NCAA tournament

College World Series
- Champions: LSU (2nd title)
- Runners-up: Wichita State (6th CWS Appearance)
- Winning coach: Skip Bertman (2nd title)
- MOP: Todd Walker (LSU)

Seasons
- ← 1992 1994 →

The 1993 NCAA Division I baseball season, play of college baseball in the United States organized by the National Collegiate Athletic Association (NCAA) began in the spring of 1993. The season progressed through the regular season and concluded with the 1993 College World Series. The College World Series, held for the 47th time in 1993, consisted of one team from each of eight regional competitions and was held in Omaha, Nebraska, at Johnny Rosenblatt Stadium as a double-elimination tournament. LSU claimed the championship for the second time.

== Realignment ==
- Army and Navy departed the Eastern Intercollegiate Baseball League, which dissolved. The Ivy League began sponsoring baseball for its 8 members, all of whom had previously competed in the EIBL. Four teams were placed in each Ivy League Division.
- Army and Navy joined the Patriot League, which divided into two divisions of four teams each.
- Davidson rejoined the Southern Conference after a four-year absence.
- UCF departed the Sun Belt Conference and joined the Trans America Athletic Conference

=== Format changes ===
- The Mid-Continent Conference dissolved its two divisions and competed as a single conference.
- With the addition of UCF to the East, the TAAC shifted Mercer to the West Division.

== Conference winners ==
This is a partial list of conference champions from the 1993 season. The NCAA sponsored regional competitions to determine the College World Series participants. Each of the eight regionals consisted of six teams competing in double-elimination tournaments, with the winners advancing to Omaha. 24 teams earned automatic bids by winning their conference championship while 24 teams earned at-large selections.

Conference	Regular season winner	Conference Tournament	Tournament Venue • City	Tournament Winner
Atlantic 10 Conference	Rutgers	1993 Atlantic 10 Conference baseball tournament	Bear Stadium • Boyertown, PA	Rutgers
Atlantic Coast Conference	Georgia Tech	1993 Atlantic Coast Conference baseball tournament	Greenville Municipal Stadium • Greenville, SC	Clemson
Big East Conference	Villanova	1993 Big East Conference baseball tournament	Muzzy Field • Bristol, CT	St. John's
Big Eight Conference	Oklahoma State	1993 Big Eight Conference baseball tournament	All Sports Stadium • Oklahoma City, OK	Oklahoma State
Big South Conference	Coastal Carolina	1993 Big South Conference baseball tournament	Charles Watson Stadium • Conway, SC	Liberty
Big Ten Conference	Ohio State	1993 Big Ten Conference baseball tournament	C. O. Brown Stadium • Battle Creek, MI	Minnesota
Big West Conference	Long Beach State	no tournament		
Colonial Athletic Association	George Mason	1993 Colonial Athletic Association baseball tournament	Brooks Field • Wilmington, NC	East Carolina
Ivy League	Gehrig - Columbia; Rolfe - Yale	1993 Ivy League Baseball Championship Series	Palmer Field • Middletown, CT	Yale
Metro Conference		1993 Metro Conference baseball tournament	The Diamond • Richmond, VA	Charlotte
Mid-American Conference	Kent State	1993 Mid-American Conference baseball tournament	Gene Michael Field • Kent, OH	Kent State
Midwestern Collegiate Conference	Notre Dame	1993 Midwestern Collegiate Conference baseball tournament	Stanley Coveleski Regional Stadium • South Bend, IN	Notre Dame
Mid-Continent Conference	Wright State	1993 Mid-Continent Conference baseball tournament	Chicago, IL	UIC
North Atlantic Conference	Maine	1993 North Atlantic Conference baseball tournament	Delaware Diamond • Newark, DE	Maine
Northeast Conference	Fairleigh Dickinson	1993 Northeast Conference baseball tournament	Ewing Township, NJ	St. Francis
Pacific-10 Conference	North - Washington; South - Arizona State	no tournament		
Patriot League	North - Fordham; South - Navy	1993 Patriot League baseball tournament	Houlihan Park • Bronx, NY	Fordham
Southeastern Conference	Eastern - Tennessee	1993 Southeastern Conference baseball tournament (Note: The SEC held separate tournaments for its Eastern and Western Divisions in 1993. LSU was awarded the automatic bid to the NCAA tournament.)	Sarge Frye Field • Columbia, SC	Tennessee
Southeastern Conference	Western - LSU	1993 Southeastern Conference baseball tournament	Alex Box Stadium • Baton Rouge, LA	LSU
Southern Conference	Georgia Southern	1993 Southern Conference baseball tournament	College Park • Charleston, SC	Western Carolina
Southland Conference	Northwestern State	1993 Southland Conference baseball tournament	H. Alvin Brown–C. C. Stroud Field • Natchitoches, LA	McNeese State
Southwest Conference	Texas A&M	1993 Southwest Conference baseball tournament	Disch–Falk Field • Austin, TX	Baylor
Trans America Athletic Conference	East - Stetson; West - Southeastern Louisiana	1993 Trans America Athletic Conference baseball tournament	Conrad Park • DeLand, FL	UCF
West Coast Conference	Pepperdine	No tournament		

== Conference standings ==
The following is an incomplete list of conference standings:

1993 Atlantic Coast Conference baseball standings
	Conf.				Overall
Team	W		L	PCT	W		L	PCT
No. 13 Georgia Tech ‍†‍‍^{y}	16	–	6	.727	47	–	14	.770
No. 21 NC State ‍‍‍^{y}	15	–	7	.682	49	–	17	.742
No. 22 Florida State ‍‍‍^{y}	14	–	9	.609	46	–	19	.708
No. 23 North Carolina ‍‍‍^{y}	13	–	10	.565	43	–	20	.683
No. 17 Clemson ‍‍‡‍^{y}	11	–	11	.500	45	–	20	.692
Duke ‍‍‍	11	–	13	.458	39	–	19	.672
Wake Forest ‍‍‍	9	–	13	.409	31	–	22	.585
Virginia ‍‍‍	7	–	15	.318	21	–	30	.412
Maryland ‍‍‍	5	–	17	.227	24	–	29	.453
† – Conference champion ‡ – Tournament champion y – Invited to the NCAA tournament As of June 30, 1993; Rankings from Collegiate Baseball

1993 Big East Conference baseball standings
	Conf.						Overall
Team	W		L		T	PCT	W		L		T	PCT
Villanova ‍†‍‍	14	–	7	–	0	.667	27	–	15	–	1	.640
Seton Hall ‍‍‍	12	–	8	–	0	.600	30	–	18	–	0	.625
Connecticut ‍‍‍^{y}	12	–	9	–	0	.571	27	–	19	–	0	.587
No. 14 St. John's ‍‍‡‍^{y}	11	–	10	–	0	.524	28	–	20	–	0	.583
Boston College ‍‍‍	11	–	10	–	0	.524	22	–	14	–	0	.611
Pittsburgh ‍‍‍	10	–	11	–	0	.476	30	–	13	–	0	.698
Providence ‍‍‍	8	–	12	–	0	.400	21	–	24	–	0	.467
Georgetown ‍‍‍	5	–	16	–	0	.238	7	–	22	–	0	.241
† – Conference champion ‡ – Tournament champion y – Invited to the NCAA tournament As of June 30, 1993; Rankings from Collegiate Baseball

1993 Big Eight Conference baseball standings
	Conf.				Overall
Team	W		L	PCT	W		L	PCT
No. 4 Oklahoma State ‍†‍‡‍^{y}	16	–	8	.667	45	–	17	.726
No. 8 Kansas ‍‍‍^{y}	17	–	9	.654	39	–	19	.672
Missouri ‍‍‍	15	–	10	.600	30	–	19	.612
Nebraska ‍‍‍	16	–	12	.571	35	–	23	.603
Oklahoma ‍‍‍	13	–	14	.481	31	–	24	.564
Kansas State ‍‍‍	6	–	17	.261	15	–	34	.306
Iowa State ‍‍‍	5	–	18	.217	17	–	28	.378
† – Conference champion ‡ – Tournament champion y – Invited to the NCAA tournament As of June 30, 1993; Rankings from Collegiate Baseball

1993 Big South Conference baseball standings
	Conf.				Overall
Team	W		L	PCT	W		L	PCT
Coastal Carolina ‍†‍‍	15	–	8	.652	28	–	28	.500
UMBC ‍‍‍	14	–	8	.636	26	–	17	.605
Towson State ‍‍‍	14	–	9	.609	20	–	25	.444
Winthrop ‍‍‍	12	–	10	.545	27	–	31	.466
Radford ‍‍‍	10	–	10	.500	29	–	19	.604
Liberty ‍‍‡‍^{y}	10	–	11	.476	23	–	25	.479
Campbell ‍‍‍	8	–	11	.421	17	–	33	.340
Charleston Southern ‍‍‍	7	–	15	.318	19	–	22	.463
UNC Asheville ‍‍‍	6	–	14	.300	19	–	27	.413
UNC Greensboro ‍‍‍	0	–	0	–	23	–	22	.511
† – Conference champion ‡ – Tournament champion y – Invited to the NCAA tournament As of June 30, 1993; Rankings from Collegiate Baseball

1993 Big Ten Conference baseball standings
	Conf.				Overall
Team	W		L	PCT	W		L	PCT
No. 12 Ohio State ‍†‍‍^{y}	19	–	9	.679	44	–	19	.698
Minnesota ‍‍‡‍^{y}	17	–	9	.654	43	–	18	.705
Purdue ‍‍‍	16	–	12	.571	36	–	22	.621
Indiana ‍‍‍	15	–	12	.556	38	–	21	.644
Northwestern ‍‍‍	15	–	13	.536	27	–	27	.500
Iowa ‍‍‍	13	–	13	.500	32	–	20	.615
Michigan ‍‍‍	13	–	14	.481	25	–	30	.455
Michigan State ‍‍‍	12	–	16	.429	31	–	23	.574
Illinois ‍‍‍	12	–	16	.429	32	–	23	.582
Penn State ‍‍‍	5	–	23	.179	15	–	28	.349
x – Division champion ‡ – Tournament champion y – Invited to the NCAA tournament As of June 30, 1993; Rankings from Collegiate Baseball

1993 Colonial Athletic Association baseball standings
	Conf.						Overall
Team	W		L		T	PCT	W		L		T	PCT
George Mason ‍†‍‍^{y}	10	–	1	–	0	.909	33	–	15	–	0	.688
Old Dominion ‍‍‍	9	–	3	–	0	.750	31	–	11	–	0	.738
East Carolina ‍‍‡‍^{y}	11	–	7	–	0	.611	41	–	19	–	0	.683
UNC Wilmington ‍‍‍	6	–	8	–	0	.429	26	–	29	–	0	.473
James Madison ‍‍‍	3	–	7	–	1	.318	24	–	24	–	1	.500
Richmond ‍‍‍	3	–	8	–	1	.292	29	–	18	–	1	.615
William & Mary ‍‍‍	3	–	12	–	0	.200	24	–	19	–	1	.557
† – Conference champion ‡ – Tournament champion y – Invited to the NCAA tournament As of June 30, 1993; Rankings from Collegiate Baseball

1993 Ivy League baseball standings
	Conf.				Overall
Team	W		L	PCT	W		L	PCT
Lou Gehrig
Columbia ^{x}‍‍‍	11	–	9	.550	19	–	21	.475
Penn ‍‍‍	10	–	10	.500	17	–	19	.472
Princeton ‍‍‍	10	–	10	.500	16	–	25	.390
Cornell ‍‍‍	3	–	17	.150	6	–	29	.171
Red Rolfe
Yale ^{x}‍‍‡‍^{y}	16	–	4	.800	33	–	11	.750
Harvard ‍‍‍	12	–	8	.600	18	–	20	.474
Brown ‍‍‍	10	–	10	.500	13	–	27	.325
Dartmouth ‍‍‍	8	–	12	.400	14	–	19	.424
x – Division champion ‡ – Championship Series champion y – Invited to the NCAA tournament As of June 30, 1993; Rankings from Collegiate Baseball

1993 Mid-American Conference baseball standings
	Conf.						Overall
Team	W		L		T	PCT	W		L		T	PCT
No. 27 Kent State ‍†‍‡‍^{y}	22	–	10	–	0	.688	41	–	15	–	0	.732
Central Michigan ‍‍‍	22	–	10	–	0	.688	39	–	19	–	0	.672
Western Michigan ‍‍‍	20	–	10	–	0	.667	35	–	21	–	0	.625
Ball State ‍‍‍	17	–	13	–	0	.567	32	–	24	–	0	.571
Ohio ‍‍‍	13	–	15	–	0	.464	21	–	26	–	0	.447
Toledo ‍‍‍	13	–	17	–	0	.433	24	–	31	–	0	.436
Eastern Michigan ‍‍‍	13	–	17	–	0	.433	30	–	24	–	0	.556
Miami ‍‍‍	12	–	18	–	0	.400	26	–	27	–	0	.491
Bowling Green ‍‍‍	11	–	17	–	0	.393	19	–	27	–	1	.415
Akron ‍‍‍	7	–	23	–	0	.233	22	–	33	–	0	.400
† – Conference champion ‡ – Tournament champion y – Invited to the NCAA tournament As of June 30, 1993; Rankings from Collegiate Baseball

1993 Mid-Continent Conference baseball standings
	Conf.						Overall
Team	W		L		T	PCT	W		L		T	PCT
Wright State ‍†‍‍	17	–	3	–	0	.850	39	–	15	–	0	.722
UIC ‍‍‡‍	13	–	8	–	0	.619	31	–	26	–	0	.544
Eastern Illinois ‍‍‍	9	–	6	–	1	.594	23	–	23	–	1	.500
Cleveland State ‍‍‍	10	–	10	–	0	.500	23	–	26	–	0	.469
Valparaiso ‍‍‍	8	–	12	–	0	.400	12	–	39	–	1	.240
Western Illinois ‍‍‍	7	–	12	–	1	.375	12	–	28	–	1	.305
Northern Illinois ‍‍‍	6	–	13	–	0	.316	16	–	34	–	1	.324
Youngstown State ‍‍‍	5	–	11	–	0	.313	20	–	26	–	0	.435
Milwaukee ‍‍‍	0	–	0	–	0	–	10	–	19	–	0	.345
‡ – Tournament champion As of June 30, 1993; Rankings from Collegiate Baseball

1993 Midwestern Collegiate Conference baseball standings
	Conf.						Overall
Team	W		L		T	PCT	W		L		T	PCT
No. 11 Notre Dame ‍†‍‡‍^{y}	23	–	4	–	0	.852	46	–	16	–	0	.742
Detroit ‍‍‍	20	–	8	–	0	.714	29	–	21	–	0	.580
Evansville ‍‍‍	19	–	8	–	0	.704	43	–	18	–	0	.705
Butler ‍‍‍	14	–	14	–	0	.500	27	–	27	–	1	.500
Xavier ‍‍‍	12	–	16	–	0	.429	19	–	40	–	0	.322
Dayton ‍‍‍	10	–	18	–	0	.357	22	–	39	–	0	.361
La Salle ‍‍‍	8	–	20	–	0	.286	13	–	31	–	0	.295
Duquesne ‍‍‍	5	–	23	–	0	.179	9	–	32	–	0	.220
† – Conference champion ‡ – Tournament champion y – Invited to the NCAA Tournament; As of June 30, 1993; Rankings from Collegiate Baseball

1993 Missouri Valley Conference baseball standings
	Conf.				Overall
Team	W		L	PCT	W		L	PCT
No. 2 Wichita State ‍†‍‡‍^{y}	17	–	3	.850	58	–	17	.773
Southwest Missouri State ‍‍‍	14	–	6	.700	32	–	23	.582
Bradley ‍‍‍	13	–	7	.650	40	–	16	.714
Indiana State ‍‍‍	12	–	9	.571	35	–	23	.603
Creighton ‍‍‍	10	–	11	.476	32	–	25	.561
Illinois State ‍‍‍	10	–	11	.476	28	–	31	.475
Southern Illinois ‍‍‍	5	–	15	.250	22	–	29	.431
Northern Iowa ‍‍‍	1	–	20	.048	12	–	39	.235
† – Conference champion ‡ – Tournament champion y – Invited to the NCAA tournament As of June 30, 1993; Rankings from Collegiate Baseball

1993 Northeast Conference baseball standings
	Conf.						Overall
Team	W		L		T	PCT	W		L		T	PCT
Fairleigh Dickinson ‍†‍‍	15	–	6	–	0	.714	28	–	16	–	0	.636
Long Island ‍‍‍	14	–	6	–	0	.700	17	–	18	–	0	.486
St. Francis ‍‍‡‍	13	–	8	–	0	.619	25	–	15	–	0	.625
Monmouth ‍‍‍	13	–	8	–	0	.619	17	–	20	–	0	.459
Rider ‍‍‍	12	–	9	–	0	.571	21	–	18	–	0	.538
Wagner ‍‍‍	6	–	14	–	0	.300	9	–	23	–	0	.281
Marist ‍‍‍	5	–	13	–	0	.278	9	–	24	–	1	.279
Mount St. Mary's ‍‍‍	1	–	15	–	0	.063	6	–	24	–	0	.200
† – Conference champion ‡ – Tournament champion y – Invited to the NCAA tournament Rankings from Collegiate Baseball

1993 Pacific-10 Conference baseball standings
	Conf.				Overall
Team	W		L	PCT	W		L	PCT
Northern
Oregon State ^{x}‍‍‍	15	–	6	.714	32	–	18	.640
Washington ‍‍‍	16	–	7	.696	39	–	19	.672
Washington State ‍‍‍	13	–	10	.565	34	–	24	.586
Portland State ‍‍‍	9	–	11	.450	31	–	27	.534
Gonzaga ‍‍‍	8	–	15	.348	17	–	36	.321
Portland ‍‍‍	5	–	17	.227	16	–	33	.327
Southern
No. 7 Arizona State ^{x}‍‍‍^{y}	19	–	11	.633	46	–	20	.697
No. 24 UCLA ‍‍‍^{y}	17	–	13	.567	37	–	23	.617
No. 9 Arizona ‍‍‍^{y}	16	–	14	.533	35	–	26	.574
No. 18 Southern California ‍‍‍^{y}	15	–	15	.500	35	–	29	.547
California ‍‍‍	13	–	17	.433	27	–	30	.474
Stanford ‍‍‍	10	–	20	.333	27	–	28	.491
x – Division champion y – Invited to the NCAA tournament As of June 30, 1993; Rankings from Collegiate Baseball

1993 Patriot League baseball standings
	Conf.				Overall
Team	W		L	PCT	W		L	PCT
North
Fordham ^{x}‍‍‡‍^{y}	13	–	7	.650	32	–	27	.542
Army ‍‍‍	11	–	9	.550	17	–	22	.436
Holy Cross ‍‍‍	9	–	11	.450	12	–	20	.375
Colgate ‍‍‍	6	–	14	.300	8	–	20	.286
South
Navy ^{x}‍‍‍	11	–	9	.550	20	–	16	.556
Lehigh ‍‍‍	10	–	10	.500	15	–	19	.441
Bucknell ‍‍‍	10	–	10	.500	15	–	25	.375
Lafayette ‍‍‍	10	–	10	.500	12	–	21	.364
x – Division champion ‡ – Tournament champion y – Invited to the NCAA tournament As of June 30, 1993; Rankings from Collegiate Baseball

1993 Southeastern Conference baseball standings
	Conf.				Overall
Team	W		L	PCT	W		L	PCT
Eastern
No. 20 Tennessee ^{x}‍‍‡‍^{y}	20	–	10	.667	45	–	20	.692
No. 29 South Carolina ‍‍‍^{y}	15	–	10	.600	39	–	20	.661
Kentucky ‍‍‍^{y}	14	–	14	.500	38	–	23	.623
Florida ‍‍‍	12	–	14	.462	33	–	25	.569
Vanderbilt ‍‍‍	11	–	15	.423	32	–	23	.582
Georgia ‍‍‍	10	–	18	.357	30	–	29	.508
Western
No. 1 LSU ^{x}‍†‍‡‍^{y}	18	–	8	.692	53	–	17	.757
No. 28 Auburn ‍‍‍^{y}	17	–	11	.607	40	–	23	.635
No. 25 Mississippi State ‍‍‍^{y}	17	–	12	.586	41	–	21	.661
Arkansas ‍‍‍	11	–	16	.407	33	–	26	.559
Alabama ‍‍‍	9	–	15	.375	27	–	25	.519
Ole Miss ‍‍‍	8	–	19	.296	31	–	25	.554
x – Division champion † – Conference champion ‡ – Tournament champion y – Invited to the NCAA tournament As of June 30, 1993; Rankings from Collegiate Baseball

1993 Southern Conference baseball standings
	Conf.				Overall
Team	W		L	PCT	W		L	PCT
Georgia Southern ‍†‍‍	18	–	5	.783	38	–	21	.644
Western Carolina ‍‍‡‍^{y}	15	–	6	.714	34	–	28	.548
The Citadel ‍‍‍	13	–	9	.591	32	–	25	.561
East Tennessee State ‍‍‍	11	–	8	.579	21	–	17	.553
Davidson ‍‍‍	11	–	9	.550	20	–	28	.417
Appalachian State ‍‍‍	8	–	12	.400	15	–	27	.357
Marshall ‍‍‍	9	–	14	.391	13	–	27	.325
VMI ‍‍‍	5	–	15	.250	20	–	29	.408
Furman ‍‍‍	4	–	16	.200	17	–	22	.436
† – Conference champion ‡ – SoCon Tournament champion y – Invited to the NCAA tournament As of June 30, 1993; Rankings from Collegiate Baseball

1993 Southland Conference baseball standings
	Conf.						Overall
Team	W		L		T	PCT	W		L		T	PCT
Northwestern State ‍†‍‍	18	–	6	–	0	.750	40	–	14	–	0	.741
Texas–Arlington ‍‍‍	17	–	6	–	0	.739	34	–	20	–	0	.630
Sam Houston State ‍‍‍	13	–	9	–	0	.591	30	–	26	–	0	.536
McNeese State ‍‍‡‍^{y}	14	–	10	–	0	.583	38	–	23	–	0	.623
Nicholls State ‍‍‍	11	–	12	–	0	.478	31	–	19	–	0	.620
Stephen F. Austin ‍‍‍	10	–	14	–	0	.417	21	–	32	–	0	.396
Texas–San Antonio ‍‍‍	9	–	15	–	0	.375	21	–	34	–	0	.382
Southwest Texas State ‍‍‍	8	–	15	–	0	.348	26	–	29	–	0	.473
Northeast Louisiana ‍‍‍	5	–	18	–	0	.217	13	–	26	–	1	.338
† – Conference champion ‡ – Tournament champion y – Invited to the NCAA tournament As of June 30, 1993; Rankings from Collegiate Baseball

1993 Southwest Conference baseball standings
	Conf.				Overall
Team	W		L	PCT	W		L	PCT
No. 5 Texas A&M ‍†‍‍^{y}	15	–	3	.833	53	–	11	.828
Texas Tech ‍‍‍	11	–	7	.611	43	–	15	.741
No. 30 Baylor ‍‍‡‍^{y}	11	–	7	.611	41	–	19	.683
No. 6 Texas ‍‍‍^{y}	11	–	7	.611	51	–	16	.761
Rice ‍‍‍	7	–	11	.389	36	–	18	.667
TCU ‍‍‍	5	–	13	.278	34	–	22	.607
Houston ‍‍‍	3	–	15	.167	31	–	24	.564
† – Conference champion ‡ – Tournament champion y – Invited to the NCAA tournament As of June 30, 1993; Rankings from Collegiate Baseball

1993 Trans America Athletic Conference baseball standings
	Conf.						Overall
Team	W		L		T	PCT	W		L		T	PCT
East
Stetson ^{x}‍‍‍	11	–	7	–	0	.611	38	–	17	–	0	.691
UCF ‍‍‡‍^{y}	9	–	9	–	0	.500	31	–	31	–	0	.500
College of Charleston ‍‍‍	9	–	9	–	0	.500	18	–	24	–	0	.429
FIU ‍‍‍	7	–	11	–	0	.389	27	–	29	–	0	.482
West
Southeastern Louisiana ^{x}‍†‍‍	19	–	5	–	0	.792	38	–	17	–	0	.691
Centenary ‍‍‍	15	–	8	–	0	.652	27	–	25	–	0	.519
Samford ‍‍‍	9	–	15	–	0	.375	16	–	32	–	1	.337
Georgia State ‍‍‍	7	–	14	–	0	.333	12	–	35	–	0	.255
Mercer ‍‍‍	6	–	14	–	0	.300	15	–	34	–	0	.306
x – Division champion † – Conference champion ‡ – Tournament champion y – Invited to the NCAA tournament As of June 30, 1993; Rankings from Collegiate Baseball

== College World Series ==
The 1993 season marked the forty seventh NCAA baseball tournament, which culminated with the eight team College World Series. The College World Series was held in Omaha, Nebraska. The eight teams played a double-elimination format, with LSU claiming their second championship with an 8–0 win over Wichita State in the final.

=== Bracket ===
First round
1	Texas A&M	5
8	Kansas	1
4	Long Beach State	1
5	LSU	7
8	Kansas	1
4	Long Beach State	6
2	Arizona State	3
7	Wichita State	4^{11}
3	Texas	6
6	Oklahoma State	5
2	Arizona State	4
6	Oklahoma State	5

Second round
1	Texas A&M	8
5	LSU	13
1	Texas A&M	2
4	Long Beach State	6
7	Wichita State	7
3	Texas	6
3	Texas	6
6	Oklahoma State	7

Semi-finals
5	LSU	8	6
4	Long Beach State	10	5
7	Wichita State	10	—
6	Oklahoma State	4	—

Finals
5	LSU	8
7	Wichita State	0
