= 1994 NCAA Division I baseball season =

Baseball season

- Number of teams: 276

NCAA tournament

College World Series
- Champions: Oklahoma (2nd title)
- Runners-up: Georgia Tech (12th CWS Appearance)
- Winning coach: Larry Cochell (1st title)
- MOP: Chip Glass (Oklahoma)

Seasons
- ← 1993 1995 →

The 1994 NCAA Division I baseball season, play of college baseball in the United States organized by the National Collegiate Athletic Association (NCAA) began in the spring of 1994. The season progressed through the regular season and concluded with the 1994 College World Series. The College World Series, held for the 48th time in 1994, consisted of one team from each of eight regional competitions and was held in Omaha, Nebraska, at Johnny Rosenblatt Stadium as a double-elimination tournament. Oklahoma claimed the championship for the second time.

== Realignment ==
- Florida Atlantic joined the Trans America Athletic Conference after reclassifying from NCAA Division II.

== Conference winners ==
This is a partial list of conference champions from the 1994 season. The NCAA sponsored regional competitions to determine the College World Series participants. Each of the eight regionals consisted of six teams competing in double-elimination tournaments, with the winners advancing to Omaha. In order to provide all conference champions with an automatic bid, 12 conference champions participated in a play-in round. The six winners joined the other 18 conference champions with automatic bids, 24 teams earned at-large selections.

Conference	Regular season winner	Conference Tournament	Tournament Venue • City	Tournament Winner
Atlantic 10 Conference	UMass	1994 Atlantic 10 Conference baseball tournament	Bear Stadium • Boyertown, PA	West Virginia
Atlantic Coast Conference	Clemson	1994 Atlantic Coast Conference baseball tournament	Greenville Municipal Stadium • Greenville, SC	Clemson
Big East Conference	Pittsburgh	1994 Big East Conference baseball tournament	Muzzy Field • Bristol, CT	Connecticut
Big Eight Conference	Oklahoma State	1994 Big Eight Conference baseball tournament	All Sports Stadium • Oklahoma City, OK	Oklahoma State
Big Ten Conference	Ohio State	1994 Big Ten Conference baseball tournament	C. O. Brown Stadium • Battle Creek, MI	Ohio State
Big West Conference	Cal State Fullerton/Long Beach State/Nevada	no tournament		
Colonial Athletic Association	Old Dominion	1994 Colonial Athletic Association baseball tournament	Bud Metheny Baseball Complex • Norfolk, VA	Old Dominion
Ivy League	Gehrig - Penn; Rolfe - Yale	1994 Ivy League Baseball Championship Series	Palmer Field • Middletown, CT	Yale
Metro Conference		1994 Metro Conference baseball tournament	Parkway Field • Louisville, KY	Virginia Tech
Metro Atlantic Athletic Conference	Northern - Canisius; Southern - Iona	1994 Metro Atlantic Athletic Conference baseball tournament	Heritage Park • Colonie, NY	Saint Peter's
Mid-American Conference	Kent State	1994 Mid-American Conference baseball tournament	Gene Michael Field • Kent, OH	Central Michigan
Midwestern Collegiate Conference	Notre Dame	1994 Midwestern Collegiate Conference baseball tournament	Frank Eck Stadium • South Bend, IN	Notre Dame
Mid-Continent Conference	Wright State	no tournament		
North Atlantic Conference	Delaware	1994 North Atlantic Conference baseball tournament	Friedman Diamond • Brookline, MA	Northeastern
Northeast Conference	Fairleigh Dickinson/Rider	1994 Northeast Conference baseball tournament	Ewing Township, NJ	Rider
Pacific-10 Conference	North - Oregon State; South - Stanford	no tournament		
Patriot League	North - Army/Fordham; South - Navy	1994 Patriot League baseball tournament	Max Bishop Stadium • Annapolis, MD	Navy
Southeastern Conference	Eastern - Tennessee	1994 Southeastern Conference baseball tournament (Note: The SEC held separate tournaments for its Eastern and Western Divisions in 1994. LSU was awarded the automatic bid to the NCAA tournament.)	Cliff Hagan Stadium • Lexington, KY	Tennessee
Southeastern Conference	Western - LSU	1994 Southeastern Conference baseball tournament	Swayze Field • Oxford, MS	LSU
Southern Conference	Western Carolina	1994 Southern Conference baseball tournament	College Park • Charleston, SC	The Citadel
Southland Conference	Northwestern State	1994 Southland Conference baseball tournament	H. Alvin Brown–C. C. Stroud Field • Natchitoches, LA	Texas–San Antonio
Southwest Conference	TCU	1994 Southwest Conference baseball tournament	Disch–Falk Field • Austin, TX	Texas
Trans America Athletic Conference	East - FIU; West - Mercer	1994 Trans America Athletic Conference baseball tournament	Claude Smith Field • Macon, GA	Southeastern Louisiana
West Coast Conference	Santa Clara	No tournament		

== Conference standings ==
The following is an incomplete list of conference standings:

1994 Atlantic Coast Conference baseball standings
	Conf.				Overall
Team	W		L	PCT	W		L	PCT
No. 9 Clemson ‍†‍‡‍^{y}	20	–	4	.833	57	–	18	.760
No. 2 Georgia Tech ‍‍‍^{y}	16	–	8	.667	50	–	17	.746
Duke ‍‍‍	16	–	8	.667	33	–	20	.623
No. 6 Florida State ‍‍‍^{y}	14	–	9	.609	53	–	22	.707
NC State ‍‍‍^{y}	13	–	11	.542	46	–	18	.719
North Carolina ‍‍‍	10	–	13	.435	34	–	21	.618
Wake Forest ‍‍‍	10	–	14	.417	37	–	20	.649
Maryland ‍‍‍	6	–	18	.250	24	–	30	.444
Virginia ‍‍‍	2	–	22	.083	20	–	34	.370
† – Conference champion ‡ – Tournament champion y – Invited to the NCAA tournament As of June 30, 1994; Rankings from Collegiate Baseball

1994 Big East Conference baseball standings
	Conf.						Overall
Team	W		L		T	PCT	W		L		T	PCT
Pittsburgh ‍†‍‍	16	–	5	–	0	.762	31	–	16	–	1	.656
Providence ‍‍‍	13	–	8	–	0	.619	32	–	21	–	0	.604
Seton Hall ‍‍‍	12	–	8	–	0	.600	32	–	21	–	1	.602
Connecticut ‍‍‡‍^{y}	12	–	9	–	0	.571	30	–	18	–	0	.625
St. John's ‍‍‍	10	–	8	–	0	.556	20	–	16	–	0	.556
Georgetown ‍‍‍	6	–	12	–	1	.342	17	–	31	–	1	.357
Boston College ‍‍‍	5	–	14	–	0	.263	14	–	23	–	2	.385
Villanova ‍‍‍	4	–	14	–	0	.222	16	–	23	–	0	.410
† – Conference champion ‡ – Tournament champion y – Invited to the NCAA tournament As of June 30, 1994; Rankings from Collegiate Baseball

1994 Big Eight Conference baseball standings
	Conf.				Overall
Team	W		L	PCT	W		L	PCT
No. 12 Oklahoma State ‍†‍‡‍^{y}	21	–	6	.778	49	–	17	.742
No. 1 Oklahoma ‍‍‍^{y}	21	–	9	.700	50	–	17	.746
No. 25 Kansas ‍‍‍^{y}	17	–	9	.654	40	–	18	.690
Iowa State ‍‍‍	15	–	14	.517	30	–	28	.517
Nebraska ‍‍‍	14	–	16	.467	32	–	28	.533
Missouri ‍‍‍	9	–	19	.321	32	–	26	.552
Kansas State ‍‍‍	3	–	27	.100	13	–	43	.232
† – Conference champion ‡ – Tournament champion y – Invited to the NCAA tournament As of June 30, 1994; Rankings from Collegiate Baseball

1994 Big Ten Conference baseball standings
	Conf.				Overall
Team	W		L	PCT	W		L	PCT
No. 11 Ohio State ‍†‍‡‍^{y}	25	–	2	.926	49	–	9	.845
No. 28 Minnesota ‍‍‍^{y}	21	–	7	.750	42	–	21	.667
Michigan ‍‍‍	13	–	15	.464	29	–	29	.500
Michigan State ‍‍‍	13	–	15	.464	26	–	29	.473
Iowa ‍‍‍	13	–	15	.464	22	–	32	.407
Penn State ‍‍‍	12	–	15	.444	25	–	24	.510
Indiana ‍‍‍	12	–	16	.429	33	–	23	.589
Illinois ‍‍‍	12	–	16	.429	26	–	26	.500
Northwestern ‍‍‍	10	–	18	.357	34	–	22	.607
Purdue ‍‍‍	8	–	20	.286	16	–	39	.291
x – Division champion ‡ – Tournament champion y – Invited to the NCAA tournament As of June 30, 1994; Rankings from Collegiate Baseball

1994 Big West Conference baseball standings
	Conf.				Overall
Team	W		L	PCT	W		L	PCT
No. 20 Long Beach State ‍†‍‍^{y}	16	–	5	.762	41	–	19	.683
No. 19 Nevada ‍†‍‍^{y}	16	–	5	.762	41	–	15	.732
No. 3 Cal State Fullerton ‍‍‍^{y}	15	–	5	.750	47	–	16	.746
San Jose State ‍‍‍	9	–	12	.429	29	–	26	.527
Pacific ‍‍‍	8	–	12	.400	36	–	18	.667
UNLV ‍‍‍	8	–	13	.381	27	–	28	.491
UC Santa Barbara ‍‍‍	7	–	14	.333	21	–	33	.389
New Mexico State ‍‍‍	4	–	17	.190	21	–	31	.404
† – Conference champion y – Invited to the NCAA tournament As of June 30, 1994; Rankings from Collegiate Baseball

1994 Colonial Athletic Association baseball standings
	Conf.						Overall
Team	W		L		T	PCT	W		L		T	PCT
No. 30 Old Dominion ‍†‍‡‍^{y}	14	–	4	–	0	.778	40	–	14	–	0	.741
James Madison ‍‍‍	11	–	7	–	0	.611	40	–	19	–	1	.675
Richmond ‍‍‍	11	–	7	–	0	.611	36	–	19	–	0	.655
UNC Wilmington ‍‍‍	10	–	8	–	0	.556	30	–	28	–	0	.517
East Carolina ‍‍‍	8	–	9	–	0	.471	36	–	18	–	0	.667
William & Mary ‍‍‍	7	–	11	–	0	.389	24	–	23	–	1	.510
George Mason ‍‍‍	1	–	16	–	0	.059	18	–	32	–	1	.363
† – Conference champion ‡ – Tournament champion y – Invited to the NCAA tournament As of June 30, 1994; Rankings from Collegiate Baseball

1994 NCAA Division I baseball independents standings
	Conf.				Overall
Team	W		L	PCT	W		L	PCT
No. 5 Miami (FL) ‍‍‍^{y}		–		–	49	–	14	.778
Troy State ‍‍‍		–		–	34	–	16	.680
Grand Canyon ‍‍‍		–		–	29	–	33	.468
Northeastern Illinois ‍‍‍		–		–	20	–	32	.385
Chicago State ‍‍‍		–		–	9	–	40	.184
Southern Utah ‍‍‍		–		–	7	–	43	.140
y – Invited to the NCAA tournament As of June 30, 1994; Rankings from Collegiate Baseball

1994 Ivy League baseball standings
	Conf.						Overall
Team	W		L		T	PCT	W		L		T	PCT
Lou Gehrig
Penn ^{x}‍‍‍	14	–	6	–	0	.700	25	–	12	–	1	.671
Columbia ‍‍‍	12	–	8	–	0	.600	18	–	24	–	0	.429
Princeton ‍‍‍	10	–	10	–	0	.500	21	–	19	–	0	.525
Cornell ‍‍‍	7	–	13	–	0	.350	12	–	25	–	0	.324
Red Rolfe
Yale ^{x}‍‍‡‍^{y}	14	–	6	–	0	.700	24	–	19	–	0	.558
Dartmouth ‍‍‍	9	–	11	–	0	.450	16	–	21	–	0	.432
Harvard ‍‍‍	7	–	13	–	0	.350	13	–	22	–	1	.375
Brown ‍‍‍	7	–	13	–	0	.350	10	–	28	–	0	.263
x – Division champion ‡ – Championship Series champion y – Invited to the NCAA tournament As of June 30, 1994; Rankings from Collegiate Baseball

1994 Metro Atlantic Athletic Conference baseball standings
	Conf.				Overall
Team	W		L	PCT	W		L	PCT
Northern
Canisius ^{x}‍‍‍	17	–	1	.944	28	–	14	.667
Le Moyne ‍‍‍	9	–	9	.500	18	–	15	.545
Siena ‍‍‍	8	–	10	.444	15	–	22	.405
Niagara ‍‍‍	2	–	16	.111	9	–	29	.237
Southern
Iona ^{x}‍‍‍	13	–	5	.722	21	–	22	.488
Saint Peter's ‍‍‡‍	11	–	7	.611	18	–	22	.450
Fairfield ‍‍‍	10	–	8	.556	15	–	22	.405
Manhattan ‍‍‍	2	–	16	.111	2	–	31	.061
x – Division champion As of June 30, 1994; Rankings from Collegiate Baseball

1994 Mid-American Conference baseball standings
	Conf.				Overall
Team	W		L	PCT	W		L	PCT
No. 29 Kent State ‍†‍‍^{y}	18	–	7	.720	33	–	17	.660
Ohio ‍‍‍	18	–	10	.643	34	–	19	.642
Bowling Green ‍‍‍	16	–	10	.615	29	–	18	.617
Central Michigan ‍‍‡‍^{y}	18	–	12	.600	38	–	21	.644
Western Michigan ‍‍‍	18	–	12	.600	30	–	23	.566
Eastern Michigan ‍‍‍	15	–	12	.556	29	–	27	.518
Toledo ‍‍‍	12	–	16	.429	23	–	31	.426
Akron ‍‍‍	10	–	16	.385	29	–	25	.537
Miami ‍‍‍	9	–	21	.300	18	–	36	.333
Ball State ‍‍‍	4	–	22	.154	17	–	32	.347
† – Conference champion ‡ – Tournament champion y – Invited to the NCAA tournament As of June 30, 1994; Rankings from Collegiate Baseball

1994 Midwestern Collegiate Conference baseball standings
	Conf.				Overall
Team	W		L	PCT	W		L	PCT
No. 18 Notre Dame ‍†‍‡‍^{y}	14	–	4	.778	46	–	16	.742
Butler ‍‍‍	11	–	8	.579	27	–	29	.482
Evansville ‍‍‍	10	–	8	.556	31	–	28	.525
Detroit ‍‍‍	10	–	10	.500	24	–	27	.471
Xavier ‍‍‍	5	–	10	.333	19	–	35	.352
La Salle ‍‍‍	3	–	13	.188	10	–	36	.217
† – Conference champion ‡ – Tournament champion y – Invited to the NCAA Tournament; As of June 30, 1994; Rankings from Collegiate Baseball

1994 Northeast Conference baseball standings
	Conf.						Overall
Team	W		L		T	PCT	W		L		T	PCT
Fairleigh Dickinson ‍†‍‍	15	–	6	–	0	.714	26	–	16	–	0	.619
Rider ‍†‍‡‍^{y}	15	–	6	–	0	.714	33	–	18	–	2	.642
Long Island ‍‍‍	14	–	7	–	0	.667	25	–	19	–	0	.568
Wagner ‍‍‍	11	–	10	–	0	.524	19	–	22	–	0	.463
St. Francis ‍‍‍	10	–	11	–	0	.476	17	–	21	–	0	.447
Monmouth ‍‍‍	7	–	13	–	0	.350	13	–	23	–	0	.361
Mount St. Mary's ‍‍‍	6	–	15	–	0	.286	11	–	27	–	0	.289
Marist ‍‍‍	5	–	15	–	0	.250	10	–	29	–	0	.256
† – Conference champion ‡ – Tournament champion y – Invited to the NCAA tournament Rankings from Collegiate Baseball

1994 Pacific-10 Conference baseball standings
	Conf.				Overall
Team	W		L	PCT	W		L	PCT
Northern
Oregon State ^{x}‍‍‍	22	–	8	.733	35	–	19	.648
No. 16 Washington ‍‍‍^{y}	20	–	10	.667	46	–	18	.719
Portland State ‍‍‍	14	–	16	.467	30	–	24	.556
Gonzaga ‍‍‍	13	–	17	.433	29	–	23	.558
Washington State ‍‍‍	11	–	19	.367	35	–	26	.574
Portland ‍‍‍	10	–	20	.333	22	–	33	.400
Southern
No. 13 Stanford ^{x}‍‍‍^{y}	21	–	9	.700	36	–	24	.600
No. 4 Arizona State ‍‍‍^{y}	20	–	10	.667	45	–	18	.714
No. 14 Southern California ‍‍‍^{y}	19	–	11	.633	41	–	20	.672
California ‍‍‍	12	–	18	.400	25	–	35	.417
UCLA ‍‍‍	11	–	19	.367	22	–	36	.379
Arizona ‍‍‍	7	–	23	.233	15	–	40	.273
x – Division champion y – Invited to the NCAA tournament As of June 30, 1994; Rankings from Collegiate Baseball

1994 Patriot League baseball standings
	Conf.						Overall
Team	W		L		T	PCT	W		L		T	PCT
North
Army ^{x}‍‍‍	17	–	3	–	0	.850	25	–	17	–	0	.595
Fordham ^{x}‍‍‍	17	–	3	–	0	.850	28	–	19	–	0	.596
Holy Cross ‍‍‍	11	–	9	–	0	.550	14	–	18	–	0	.438
Colgate ‍‍‍	1	–	17	–	0	.056	1	–	28	–	0	.034
South
Navy ^{x}‍‍‡‍	11	–	9	–	0	.550	24	–	18	–	1	.570
Lafayette ‍‍‍	8	–	12	–	0	.400	11	–	25	–	0	.306
Lehigh ‍‍‍	8	–	12	–	0	.400	11	–	17	–	0	.393
Bucknell ‍‍‍	5	–	13	–	0	.278	10	–	25	–	0	.286
x – Division champion ‡ – Tournament champion As of June 30, 1994; Rankings from Collegiate Baseball

1994 Southeastern Conference baseball standings
	Conf.				Overall
Team	W		L	PCT	W		L	PCT
Eastern
No. 10 Tennessee ^{x}‍†‍‡‍^{y}	24	–	5	.828	52	–	14	.788
No. 21 Florida ‍‍‍^{y}	16	–	9	.640	40	–	23	.635
Kentucky ‍‍‍	11	–	14	.440	32	–	25	.561
South Carolina ‍‍‍	11	–	15	.423	35	–	23	.603
Vanderbilt ‍‍‍	10	–	20	.333	28	–	30	.483
Georgia ‍‍‍	9	–	19	.321	22	–	35	.386
Western
No. 7 LSU ^{x}‍‍‡‍^{y}	21	–	6	.778	46	–	20	.697
Mississippi State ‍‍‍	15	–	12	.556	36	–	23	.610
No. 8 Auburn ‍‍‍^{y}	16	–	13	.552	44	–	21	.677
Arkansas ‍‍‍	13	–	13	.500	30	–	27	.526
Ole Miss ‍‍‍	12	–	14	.462	30	–	26	.536
Alabama ‍‍‍	4	–	22	.154	21	–	35	.375
x – Division champion † – Conference champion ‡ – Tournament champion y – Invited to the NCAA tournament As of June 30, 1994; Rankings from Collegiate Baseball

1994 Southern Conference baseball standings
	Conf.				Overall
Team	W		L	PCT	W		L	PCT
Western Carolina ‍†‍‍^{y}	19	–	4	.826	45	–	18	.714
Georgia Southern ‍‍‍	15	–	7	.682	31	–	25	.554
Marshall ‍‍‍	12	–	9	.571	23	–	20	.535
East Tennessee State ‍‍‍	12	–	11	.522	19	–	21	.475
The Citadel ‍‍‡‍^{y}	11	–	13	.458	32	–	34	.485
Appalachian State ‍‍‍	10	–	13	.435	22	–	26	.458
VMI ‍‍‍	10	–	13	.435	21	–	29	.420
Davidson ‍‍‍	10	–	14	.417	20	–	31	.392
Furman ‍‍‍	4	–	19	.174	9	–	35	.205
† – Conference champion ‡ – SoCon Tournament champion y – Invited to the NCAA tournament As of June 30, 1994; Rankings from Collegiate Baseball

1994 Southland Conference baseball standings
	Conf.				Overall
Team	W		L	PCT	W		L	PCT
Northwestern State ‍†‍‍^{y}	16	–	5	.762	44	–	15	.746
Sam Houston State ‍‍‍	15	–	9	.625	29	–	24	.547
Texas–San Antonio ‍‍‡‍	12	–	8	.600	39	–	18	.684
McNeese State ‍‍‍	13	–	9	.591	47	–	17	.734
Texas–Arlington ‍‍‍	13	–	11	.542	25	–	29	.463
Nicholls State ‍‍‍	11	–	13	.458	27	–	27	.500
Southwest Texas State ‍‍‍	10	–	13	.435	28	–	23	.549
Stephen F. Austin ‍‍‍	7	–	17	.292	13	–	42	.236
Northeast Louisiana ‍‍‍	6	–	18	.250	20	–	33	.377
† – Conference champion ‡ – Tournament champion y – Invited to the NCAA tournament As of June 30, 1994; Rankings from Collegiate Baseball

1994 Southwest Conference baseball standings
	Conf.				Overall
Team	W		L	PCT	W		L	PCT
No. 27 TCU ‍†‍‍^{y}	14	–	4	.778	38	–	22	.633
Rice ‍‍‍	12	–	6	.667	34	–	21	.618
Texas Tech ‍‍‍	12	–	6	.667	40	–	17	.702
No. 15 Texas ‍‍‡‍^{y}	9	–	9	.500	43	–	21	.672
Texas A&M ‍‍‍	6	–	12	.333	31	–	22	.585
Baylor ‍‍‍	6	–	12	.333	24	–	28	.462
Houston ‍‍‍	4	–	14	.222	30	–	26	.536
† – Conference champion ‡ – Tournament champion y – Invited to the NCAA tournament As of June 30, 1994; Rankings from Collegiate Baseball

1994 Trans America Athletic Conference baseball standings
	Conf.				Overall
Team	W		L	PCT	W		L	PCT
East
FIU ^{x}‍‍‍	12	–	6	.667	38	–	21	.644
Stetson ‍‍‍	9	–	9	.500	37	–	21	.638
UCF ‍‍‍	8	–	10	.444	29	–	26	.527
College of Charleston ‍‍‍	7	–	11	.389	27	–	21	.563
Florida Atlantic ‍‍‍	0	–	0	–	31	–	23	.574
West
Mercer ^{x}‍†‍‍	15	–	9	.625	32	–	21	.604
Southeastern Louisiana ^{x}‍†‍‡‍^{y}	15	–	9	.625	34	–	30	.531
Samford ‍‍‍	13	–	11	.542	19	–	33	.365
Centenary ‍‍‍	11	–	13	.458	23	–	28	.451
Georgia State ‍‍‍	6	–	18	.250	12	–	42	.222
x – Division champion † – Conference champion ‡ – Tournament champion y – Invited to the NCAA tournament As of June 30, 1994; Rankings from Collegiate Baseball

== College World Series ==
The 1994 season marked the forty eighth NCAA baseball tournament, which culminated with the eight team College World Series. The College World Series was held in Omaha, Nebraska. The eight teams played a double-elimination format, with Oklahoma claiming their second championship with a 13–5 win over Georgia Tech in the final.

=== Bracket ===
First round
2	Georgia Tech	2
7	Cal State Fullerton	0
6	Florida State	6
3	LSU	3
7	Cal State Fullerton	20
3	LSU	6
8	Arizona State	4
1	Miami (FL)	0
4	Oklahoma	5
5	Auburn	4
1	Miami (FL)	7
5	Auburn	5

Second round
2	Georgia Tech	12^{10}
6	Florida State	4
7	Cal State Fullerton	10
6	Florida State	3
8	Arizona State	3
4	Oklahoma	4^{11}
1	Miami (FL)	5
8	Arizona State	9

Semifinals
2	Georgia Tech	3^{12}	—
7	Cal State Fullerton	2	—
4	Oklahoma	6	—
8	Arizona State	1	—

Finals
2	Georgia Tech	5
4	Oklahoma	13
