= 1994 LSU Tigers baseball team =

American college baseball season

1994 LSU Tigers baseball

NCAA South Regional champions SEC West tournament champions SEC West champions

College World Series, 0–2
- Conference: Southeastern Conference
- Record: 46–20 (21–6 SEC)
- Head coach: Skip Bertman (11th year)
- Home stadium: Alex Box Stadium

1994 Southeastern Conference baseball standings
	Conf.				Overall
Team	W		L	PCT	W		L	PCT
Eastern
No. 10 Tennessee ^{x}‍†‍‡‍^{y}	24	–	5	.828	52	–	14	.788
No. 21 Florida ‍‍‍^{y}	16	–	9	.640	40	–	23	.635
Kentucky ‍‍‍	11	–	14	.440	32	–	25	.561
South Carolina ‍‍‍	11	–	15	.423	35	–	23	.603
Vanderbilt ‍‍‍	10	–	20	.333	28	–	30	.483
Georgia ‍‍‍	9	–	19	.321	22	–	35	.386
Western
No. 7 LSU ^{x}‍‍‡‍^{y}	21	–	6	.778	46	–	20	.697
Mississippi State ‍‍‍	15	–	12	.556	36	–	23	.610
No. 8 Auburn ‍‍‍^{y}	16	–	13	.552	44	–	21	.677
Arkansas ‍‍‍	13	–	13	.500	30	–	27	.526
Ole Miss ‍‍‍	12	–	14	.462	30	–	26	.536
Alabama ‍‍‍	4	–	22	.154	21	–	35	.375
x – Division champion † – Conference champion ‡ – Tournament champion y – Invited to the NCAA tournament As of June 30, 1994; Rankings from Collegiate Baseball

The 1994 LSU Tigers baseball team represented Louisiana State University in the 1994 NCAA Division I baseball season. The Tigers played their home games at Alex Box Stadium, and played as part of the Southeastern Conference. The team was coached by Skip Bertman in his eleventh season as head coach at LSU.

The Tigers won the SEC West, claimed championship in the SEC Western Division Tournament, then reached the College World Series, their seventh appearance in Omaha, where they were eliminated after losses to Florida State and Cal State Fullerton.

== Personnel ==
=== Roster ===
1994 LSU Tigers roster
Pitchers: 6 - Adrian Antonini - Senior; 16 - Matt Malejko - Senior; 21 - Antonio Leonardi-Cattolica - Freshman; 22 - Jay Chittam - Freshman; 24 - Damon Sims - Junior; 26 - Jeff Naquin - Junior; 27 - Brett Laxton - Sophomore; 28 - Jeremy Tyson - Sophomore; 30 - Sean Teague - Junior; 32 - Patrick Coogan - Freshman; 35 - Eric Berthelot - Sophomore; 37 - Ed Yarnall - Freshman; 38 - Jeff Harris - Freshman; 39 - Brian Winders - Sophomore; 41 - Bhrett McCabe - Junior; 42 - Scott Schultz - Junior; 44 - Jeff Hampton - Freshman	Catchers: 3 - Tim Lanier - Sophomore; 7 - Wade Bagley - Junior; 18 - Scott Berardi - Junior; 36 - Kevin Ward - Sophomore; 40 - Brian Hughes - Freshman; Outfielders: 13 - Chris Pearce - Junior; 17 - Ryan Huffman - Sophomore; 20 - Chad Cooley - Sophomore; 31 - Kevin Ainsworth - Freshman; 33 - Tom Bernhardt - Freshman	Infielders: 1 - Casey Cuntz - Freshman; 2 - Nathan Dunn - Freshman; 4 - Warren Morris - Freshman; 8 - Jason Williams - Sophomore; 9 - Russ Johnson - Junior; 10 - Brad Wilson - Sophomore; 12 - Todd Walker - Junior; 14 - Dustin Brandon - Freshman; 23 - Brian Daugherty - Freshman; 43 - Jeramie Moore - Sophomore

=== Coaches ===
1994 LSU Tigers baseball coaching staff
- Skip Bertman - Head coach - 11th Season
- Beetle Bailey - Assistant coach
- Mike Bianco - Assistant coach
- Rick Smith - Volunteer Assistant Coach

== Schedule and results ==
Legend
LSU win
LSU loss

1994 LSU Tigers baseball game log
Regular season

February
Date	Opponent	Site/Stadium	Score	Overall Record	SEC Record
Feb 18	vs Auburn*	Louisiana Superdome • New Orleans, LA (Winn-Dixie Showdown)	L 1–3	0–1	
Feb 19	vs South Alabama*	Louisiana Superdome • New Orleans, LA (Winn-Dixie Showdown)	L 3–5	0–2	
Feb 20	vs Alabama*	Louisiana Superdome • New Orleans, LA (Winn-Dixie Showdown)	W 3–0	1–2	
Feb 22	Northwestern State*	Alex Box Stadium • Baton Rouge, LA	W 11–5	2–2	
Feb 26	at Houston*	Cougar Field • Houston, TX	W 8–5	3–2	
Feb 27	at Houston*	Cougar Field • Houston, TX	W 7–2	4–2	

March
Date	Opponent	Site/Stadium	Score	Overall Record	SEC Record
Mar 3	at Tulane*	Tulane Diamond • New Orleans, LA	L 8–10	4–3	
Mar 4	UAB*	Alex Box Stadium • Baton Rouge, LA	W 11–5	5–3	
Mar 5	UAB*	Alex Box Stadium • Baton Rouge, LA	W 6–5	6–3	
Mar 6	UAB*	Alex Box Stadium • Baton Rouge, LA	W 17–6	7–3	
Mar 8	Southeastern Louisiana*	Alex Box Stadium • Baton Rouge, LA	W 11–10	8–3	
Mar 11	at Texas*	Disch–Falk Field • Austin, TX	W 9–6	9–3	
Mar 12	at Texas*	Disch–Falk Field • Austin, TX	L 7–9	9–4	
Mar 13	at Texas*	Disch–Falk Field • Austin, TX	L 1–7	9–5	
Mar 15	Louisiana College*	Alex Box Stadium • Baton Rouge, LA	L 5–7	9–6	
Mar 16	New Orleans*	Alex Box Stadium • Baton Rouge, LA	W 4–3	10–6	
Mar 18	TCU*	Alex Box Stadium • Baton Rouge, LA	W 13–6	11–6	
Mar 19	TCU*	Alex Box Stadium • Baton Rouge, LA	W 15–10	12–6	
Mar 20	TCU*	Alex Box Stadium • Baton Rouge, LA	W 16–8	13–6	
Mar 22	Arkansas State*	Alex Box Stadium • Baton Rouge, LA	W 16–1	14–6	
Mar 23	Arkansas State*	Alex Box Stadium • Baton Rouge, LA	W 8–2	15–6	
Mar 25	Vanderbilt	Alex Box Stadium • Baton Rouge, LA	W 10–4	16–6	1–0
Mar 26	Vanderbilt	Alex Box Stadium • Baton Rouge, LA	W 16–7	17–6	2–0
Mar 27	Vanderbilt	Alex Box Stadium • Baton Rouge, LA	W 4–3	18–6	3–0
Mar 30	at Lamar*	Vincent–Beck Stadium • Beaumont, TX	L 3–4	18–7	

April
Date	Opponent	Site/Stadium	Score	Overall Record	SEC Record
Apr 1	at Georgia	Foley Field • Athens, GA	W 14–11	19–7	4–0
Apr 2	at Georgia	Foley Field • Athens, GA	W 7–3	20–7	5–0
Apr 3	at Georgia	Foley Field • Athens, GA	W 12–6	21–7	6–0
Apr 4	Southern*	Alex Box Stadium • Baton Rouge, LA	W 11–2	22–7	
Apr 5	Nicholls State*	Alex Box Stadium • Baton Rouge, LA	W 12–4	23–7	
Apr 6	at Southwestern Louisiana*	Moore Family Field • Lafayette, LA	L 8–11	23–8	
Apr 8	at Kentucky	Cliff Hagan Stadium • Lexington, KY	L 6–9	23–9	6–1
Apr 9	at Kentucky	Cliff Hagan Stadium • Lexington, KY	L 3–13	23–10	6–2
Apr 12	McNeese State*	Alex Box Stadium • Baton Rouge, LA	L 3–4	23–11	
Apr 13	at New Orleans*	Privateer Park • New Orleans, LA	W 9–1	24–11	
Apr 14	Tulane*	Alex Box Stadium • Baton Rouge, LA	L 2–4	24–12	
Apr 16	Ole Miss	Alex Box Stadium • Baton Rouge, LA	W 5–4	25–12	7–2
Apr 16	Ole Miss	Alex Box Stadium • Baton Rouge, LA	W 5–2	26–12	8–2
Apr 17	Ole Miss	Alex Box Stadium • Baton Rouge, LA	W 3–2	27–12	9–2
Apr 19	at Southeastern Louisiana*	Alumni Field • Hammond, LA	W 14–8	28–12	
Apr 20	Centenary*	Alex Box Stadium • Baton Rouge, LA	W 10–4	29–12	
Apr 23	Arkansas	Alex Box Stadium • Baton Rouge, LA	W 11–3	30–12	10–2
Apr 23	Arkansas	Alex Box Stadium • Baton Rouge, LA	W 16–4	31–12	11–2
Apr 24	Arkansas	Alex Box Stadium • Baton Rouge, LA	L 5–6	31–13	11–3
Apr 26	at Nicholls State*	Ray E. Didier Field • Thibodaux, LA	L 2–3^{13}	31–14	
Apr 27	Southwestern Louisiana*	Alex Box Stadium • Baton Rouge, LA	L 8–9	31–15	
Apr 29	at Alabama	Sewell–Thomas Stadium • Tuscaloosa, AL	W 13–7	32–15	12–3
Apr 30	at Alabama	Sewell–Thomas Stadium • Tuscaloosa, AL	W 10–6	33–15	13–3

May
Date	Opponent	Site/Stadium	Score	Overall Record	SEC Record
May 1	at Alabama	Sewell–Thomas Stadium • Tuscaloosa, AL	L 5–7	33–16	13–4
May 3	South Alabama*	Alex Box Stadium • Baton Rouge, LA	W 8–4	34–16	
May 6	at Auburn	Plainsman Park • Auburn, AL	W 13–6^{10}	35–16	14–4
May 7	at Auburn	Plainsman Park • Auburn, AL	W 4–3	36–16	15–4
May 8	at Auburn	Plainsman Park • Auburn, AL	W 4–3	37–16	16–4
May 13	Mississippi State	Alex Box Stadium • Baton Rouge, LA	W 3–0	38–16	17–4
May 14	Mississippi State	Alex Box Stadium • Baton Rouge, LA	L 4–7	38–17	17–5
May 15	Mississippi State	Alex Box Stadium • Baton Rouge, LA	L 1–9	38–18	17–6

Postseason

SEC West Tournament
Date	Opponent	Seed	Site/Stadium	Score	Overall Record	SECT Record
May 19	(6) Alabama	(1)	Cliff Hagan Stadium • Lexington, KY	W 3–2	39–18	1–0
May 20	(4) Arkansas	(1)	Cliff Hagan Stadium • Lexington, KY	W 6–4	40–18	2–0
May 21	(3) Auburn	(1)	Cliff Hagan Stadium • Lexington, KY	W 3–2	41–18	3–0
May 22	(3) Auburn	(1)	Cliff Hagan Stadium • Lexington, KY	W 5–4	42–18	4–0

NCAA South Regional
Date	Opponent	Seed	Site/Stadium	Score	Overall Record	Reg Record
May 26	(6) Southeastern Louisiana	(1)	Alex Box Stadium • Baton Rouge, LA	W 10–6	43–18	1–0
May 27	(4) Fresno State	(1)	Alex Box Stadium • Baton Rouge, LA	W 6–2	44–18	2–0
May 28	(2) USC	(1)	Alex Box Stadium • Baton Rouge, LA	W 6–2	45–18	3–0
May 29	(2) USC	(1)	Alex Box Stadium • Baton Rouge, LA	W 12–10	46–18	4–0

College World Series
Date	Opponent	Seed	Site/Stadium	Score	Overall Record	CWS Record
June 3	(6) Florida State	(3)	Johnny Rosenblatt Stadium • Omaha, NE	L 3–6	46–19	0–1
June 5	(7) Cal State Fullerton	(3)	Johnny Rosenblatt Stadium • Omaha, NE	L 6–20	46–20	0–2
