= Southwest Michigan Devil Rays =

- 2005–2006; Battle Creek, Michigan

Minor league affiliations
- Previous classes: Class A
- League: Midwest League
- Division: Eastern Division

Major league affiliations
- Previous teams: Tampa Bay Devil Rays

Team data
- Previous names: Southwest Michigan Devil Rays
- Previous parks: C.O. Brown Stadium

The Southwest Michigan Devil Rays were an affiliate of the Tampa Bay Devil Rays in the Midwest League in 2005 and 2006. The club began play in 1995 and was previously known as the Michigan Battle Cats and the Battle Creek Yankees. They played their home games at C.O. Brown Stadium in Battle Creek, Michigan. Following the 2006 season, the team moved to Midland, Michigan and became known as the Great Lakes Loons.

== Team history ==
In September 2004, the New York Yankees announced a four-year player development contract with the Charleston RiverDogs of the South Atlantic League, dropping their contract with the Battle Creek Yankees. A few days later, Battle Creek signed a two-year player development contract with the Tampa Bay Devil Rays; the Devil Rays' previous low-A affiliate had been Charleston. With the announcement, it was obvious that the team's name would need to change. In December, Fun Entertainment, LLC announced that it had purchased the Battle Creek team and renamed it as the Southwest Michigan Devil Rays.

In 2005, the Midwest League comprised 14 teams in two divisions. Its championship was determined by a three-round playoff among eight teams, including the first- and second-half leaders from each division and several wild card teams. In the first half, the Devil Rays finished in fourth place of the six teams in the Eastern Division with a 33–36 record. In the second half they improved to third place with a 39–31 records, four games behind. They qualified for the playoffs, where they lost to the South Bend Silver Hawks, two games to none. Pitcher Andy Sonnanstine went 10–4 with a 2.55 earned run average and 103 strikeouts.

In January 2006, the owners of the Devil Rays announced a deal to sell the team to an investment group in Midland, Michigan, with plans to relocate the team there for the 2007 season. A foundation was formed in Midland to build a new stadium with 80 percent private funding.

In the first half of 2006, the Devil Rays tied for fifth place in the Eastern Division with a 32–37 record. In the second half they had last place to themselves, as their record fell to 30–40. Their strength was pitching; Jake McGee went 7–9 with a 2.96 earned run average and led the league in strikeouts with 171, and Wade Davis went 7–12 with a 3.02 earned run average and 165 strikeouts. Reliever Greg Dupas 4–2 with a 1.93 earned run average and 59 strikeouts in 56 innings. McGee and Dupas were named to the league's post-season all-star team.

=== Year-by-year record ===
Year	Record	Finish	Manager	Playoffs
2005	72–67	4th (t)	Joe Szekely	Lost in 1st round
2006	62–77	12th	Skeeter Barnes	
