= Shea Hillenbrand =

American baseball player (born 1975)

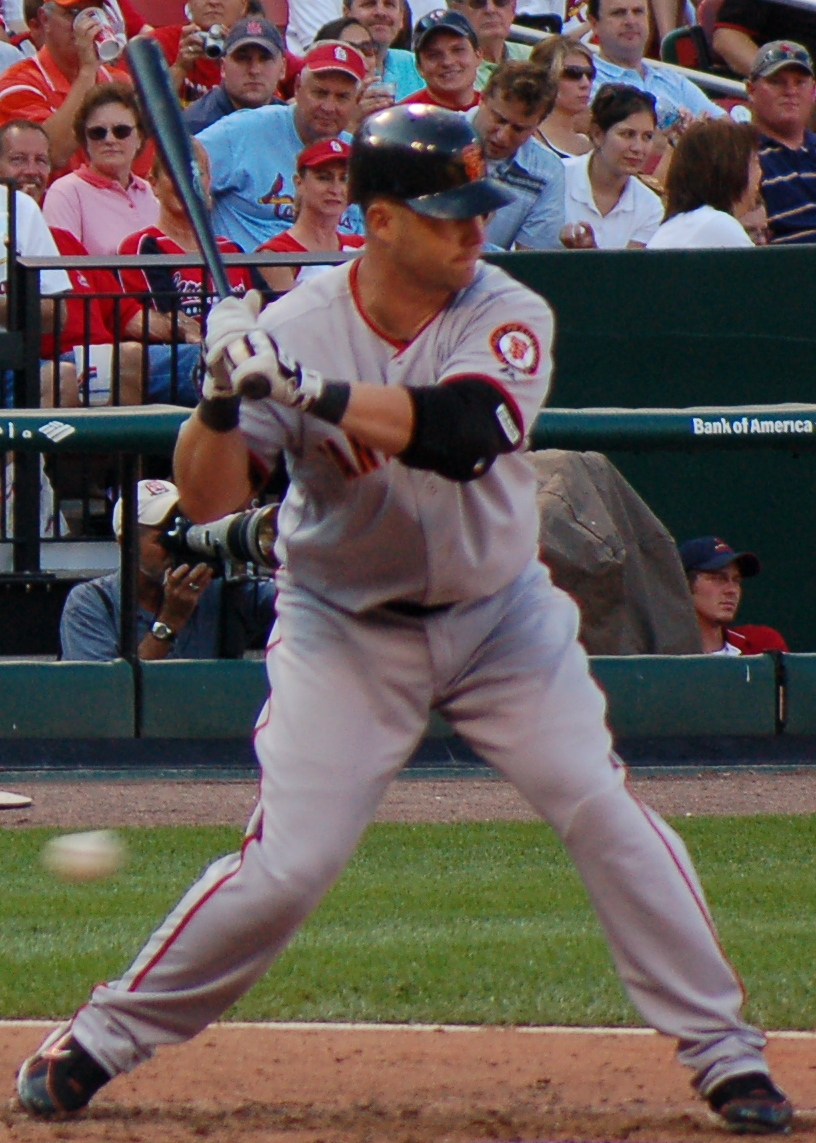
- Hillenbrand with the San Francisco Giants in 2006
- Third baseman / First baseman
- Born: July 27, 1975 (age 50); Mesa, Arizona, U.S.
- Batted: Right Threw: Right

MLB debut
- April 2, 2001, for the Boston Red Sox

Last MLB appearance
- September 20, 2007, for the Los Angeles Dodgers

MLB statistics
- Batting average: .284
- Home runs: 108
- Runs batted in: 490
- Stats at Baseball Reference

Teams
- Boston Red Sox (2001–2003); Arizona Diamondbacks (2003–2004); Toronto Blue Jays (2005–2006); San Francisco Giants (2006); Los Angeles Angels of Anaheim (2007); Los Angeles Dodgers (2007)

Career highlights and awards
- 2× All-Star (2002, 2005)

Shea Matthew Hillenbrand (born July 27, 1975) is an American former professional baseball third baseman and first baseman, who played in Major League Baseball (MLB) for the Boston Red Sox, Arizona Diamondbacks, Toronto Blue Jays, San Francisco Giants, Los Angeles Angels of Anaheim, and Los Angeles Dodgers.

== Minor league career ==
Hillenbrand played 72 games in 1996 for the Low-A Lowell Spinners in the New York–Penn League. In 1997, he was promoted to the Sarasota Red Sox of the Florida State League, and was promoted again after 57 games, finishing the season with 64 games with the Michigan Battle Cats of the Midwest League. Despite being drafted as a shortstop, he played at first base and third base his first two years in the minors.

In 1998, still with Michigan, he was converted to play catcher and responded with his best season in the minors, with a .349 batting average and 19 home runs. This earned him a promotion in 1999 to AA Trenton Thunder of the Eastern League. However, a leg injury restricted him to only 69 games.

== Major League career ==
The 2000 season saw Hillenbrand back at Trenton, now back to playing first base and third base as the injury prevented him from catching. An average season at age 25 did not bode well for his chances as a prospect, but he parlayed an invitation to spring training with the Red Sox in 2001 into a spot on the big-league team for opening day. Hillenbrand played 139 games for the Sox in his rookie season, mostly at third base, but a .263 batting average failed to hide his failure to hit with power and reach base adequately (he had one of the lowest walks-to-plate appearances rates in MLB). In 2001, he had the lowest range factor among all AL third basemen (2.46).

However, he retained his spot on the roster for 2002, and responded with a much better season, hitting 18 home runs with a .330 on-base percentage and a .459 slugging average. Hillenbrand's play earned him the starting third base spot in the All-Star Game. He tied Robin Ventura for the Major League lead in errors by a third baseman, however, with 23.

Nevertheless, Hillenbrand entered 2003 the subject of trade rumors. The Red Sox had signed free agent Bill Mueller, another third baseman, and many believed that Hillenbrand's lack of strike zone judgment would not be compatible with the on-base percentage priorities of the new Sox general manager Theo Epstein. With Mueller hitting around .380 and playing a solid third base, Hillenbrand became expendable and was sent to Arizona for pitcher Byung-hyun Kim on May 29.

He finished the season with a combined .280 batting average and career highs in RBIs (97) and home runs (20), including a three-homer game with the Diamondbacks in July. Mueller went on to win the AL Batting Title.

In 2004, Hillenbrand hit a career-high .310 with 15 home runs and 80 RBIs over 148 games. At the same time, he shared the Major League lead in errors for a first baseman, with 13. He was traded to the Toronto Blue Jays at the end of the 2004 season.

In 2005, his first year with the Blue Jays, Hillenbrand hit .291 with 18 home runs and 82 RBIs over 152 games, while splitting time between 1B, 3B, and DH. He also led the league in being hit by pitches (HBP) in 2005 with 22 a mark that remains a Blue Jays club record.

On July 19, 2006, Hillenbrand criticized the Blue Jays organization for failing to congratulate him on his recent adoption of a baby girl and not playing him upon his return. He was also disgruntled about sharing first base duties with Lyle Overbay and third base duties with Troy Glaus while being made to play as a designated hitter. Hillenbrand refused to sit with his team in the dugout during that night's game. After the game, an argument in the clubhouse took place between Hillenbrand and manager John Gibbons over Hillenbrand allegedly writing negative comments about the team on the clubhouse billboard ("This is a sinking ship" and "Play for yourself") after batting practice. This led to a confrontation between Hillenbrand and Gibbons, during which Gibbons told Hillenbrand that he would never play another game for the Blue Jays as long as he was manager. He threatened to resign if the front office sided with Hillenbrand. When general manager J. P. Ricciardi learned about the incident, he sided with Gibbons and agreed that Hillenbrand had to go.

Hillenbrand was designated for assignment that same evening, with the club citing irreconcilable differences. Two days later, Hillenbrand was traded to the San Francisco Giants with reliever Vinnie Chulk in exchange for reliever Jeremy Accardo. One baseball analyst called the deal a "heist" for Toronto, describing Hillenbrand as "clubhouse poison". Hillenbrand later admitted to writing the comments on the board. After his playing career was over, Hillenbrand said he owed Gibbons an apology, while discussing his own mental problems he had suffered as a player.

Hillenbrand signed a one-year contract with the Angels on December 26, 2006. On June 27, 2007, he was designated for assignment a day after being quoted as saying, "If I'm not going to play here, give me enough respect to trade me or get rid of me." On July 9, having been replaced by the emergence of Reggie Willits and first baseman Casey Kotchman, Hillenbrand was waived by the Angels.

He signed a minor league contract with the San Diego Padres on July 27, 2007. He spent 12 days with the Padres' Class-AAA affiliate, the Portland Beavers, before being released on August 8. He hit .147 during that span. He signed a minor league contract with the Los Angeles Dodgers on August 10. He was called up to the Major Leagues on August 13. He hit his only home run with the Dodgers on August 29 off Luis Ayala of the Washington Nationals.

In 2008, Hillenbrand went unsigned by any major league organization, only being contacted by the San Francisco Giants during the off season. On July 2, 2008, the York Revolution of the independent Atlantic League announced that they had signed Hillenbrand to be their starting third baseman. Hillenbrand played in 36 games for the Revolution, hitting .340 with two home runs and 25 RBIs before his season was ended by a hamstring injury.

Hillenbrand returned briefly to baseball after a four-year layoff, playing for the Bridgeport Bluefish of the independent Atlantic League during the 2012 season. With Bridgeport, he batted .194 in 29 games.

== Personal life ==
Hillenbrand has three adopted children from his first marriage. Hillenbrand got married for the second time in 2014. Through his second marriage, Hillenbrand has two stepchildren.

Hillenbrand used to reside on a ranch in Chandler, Arizona where he and his first wife used to run a foundation called Against All Odds. The foundation rescued and rehabilitated animals and allowed underprivileged inner-city kids to visit and interact with the animals.

The ranch went into foreclosure in 2012, and the foundation ceased operations shortly afterwards.

Hillenbrand and his second wife appeared in the House Hunters International episode “Puerto Penasco Three-Run Homer” on November 23, 2017, looking for a vacation home in Puerto Penasco, and the following year in the episode "Hitting a Homer in Phoenix."

In a text chat with baseball fans on the MLB Trade Rumors site on January 28, 2022, Hillenbrand talked about changing his life after the problems and deep unhappiness he had while being a major league ballplayer.
