= 1994 Southeastern Conference baseball tournament =

- Teams: 6
- Format: Six-team double elimination tournament
- Finals site: Cliff Hagan Stadium; Lexington, Kentucky
- Champions: Tennessee (2nd title)
- Winning coach: Rod Delmonico (2nd title)
- MVP: Todd Helton, Steve Soper (Tennessee)
- Attendance: 6,850

1994 Southeastern Conference baseball tournament
- Teams: 6
- Format: Six-team double elimination tournament
- Finals site: Swayze Field; Oxford, Mississippi
- Champions: LSU (5th title)
- Winning coach: Skip Bertman (5th title)
- MVP: Russ Johnson (LSU)
- Attendance: 21,742

1994 Southeastern Conference baseball standings
	Conf.				Overall
Team	W		L	PCT	W		L	PCT
Eastern
No. 10 Tennessee ^{x}‍†‍‡‍^{y}	24	–	5	.828	52	–	14	.788
No. 21 Florida ‍‍‍^{y}	16	–	9	.640	40	–	23	.635
Kentucky ‍‍‍	11	–	14	.440	32	–	25	.561
South Carolina ‍‍‍	11	–	15	.423	35	–	23	.603
Vanderbilt ‍‍‍	10	–	20	.333	28	–	30	.483
Georgia ‍‍‍	9	–	19	.321	22	–	35	.386
Western
No. 7 LSU ^{x}‍‍‡‍^{y}	21	–	6	.778	46	–	20	.697
Mississippi State ‍‍‍	15	–	12	.556	36	–	23	.610
No. 8 Auburn ‍‍‍^{y}	16	–	13	.552	44	–	21	.677
Arkansas ‍‍‍	13	–	13	.500	30	–	27	.526
Ole Miss ‍‍‍	12	–	14	.462	30	–	26	.536
Alabama ‍‍‍	4	–	22	.154	21	–	35	.375
x – Division champion † – Conference champion ‡ – Tournament champion y – Invited to the NCAA tournament As of June 30, 1994; Rankings from Collegiate Baseball

The 1994 Southeastern Conference baseball tournament was again held as separate tournaments for the Eastern Division and the Western Division. The Eastern Division tournament was held at Cliff Hagan Stadium in Lexington, Kentucky. The Western Division tournament was held at Swayze Field in Oxford, MS. Both tournaments were held from May 18 through 21. Tennessee won the Eastern Division tournament and LSU won the Western Division tournament.

== Regular-season results ==
Eastern Division
Team	W	L	Pct	GB	Seed
Tennessee	24	5	.828	—	1
Florida	16	9	.640	6	2
Kentucky	11	14	.440	11	3
South Carolina	11	15	.423	11.5	4
Vanderbilt	10	20	.333	14.5	5
Georgia	9	19	.321	14.5	6

Western Division
Team	W	L	Pct	GB	Seed
LSU	21	6	.778	—	1
Mississippi State	15	12	.556	6	2
Auburn	16	13	.552	6	3
Arkansas	13	13	.500	7.5	4
Ole Miss	12	14	.462	8.5	5
Alabama	4	22	.154	16.5	6

== Tournaments ==
=== Eastern Division ===
First round
1	Tennessee	20
5	Vanderbilt	12
6	Georgia	4*
2	Florida	3*
3	Kentucky	6
4	South Carolina	5

Second round
1	Tennessee	8
4	South Carolina	1
6	Georgia	17
3	Kentucky	5
5	Vanderbilt	15
2	Florida	7

Third round
1	Tennessee	5
6	Georgia	2
5	Vanderbilt	15
3	Kentucky	6

Semifinals
5	Vanderbilt	6
6	Georgia	1

Final
1	Tennessee	1	6
5	Vanderbilt	4	3

- * indicates extra-inning game.

=== Western Division ===
First round
1	LSU	3
6	Alabama	2
2	Mississippi State	4
5	Ole Miss	1
3	Auburn	3
4	Arkansas	1

Second round
1	LSU	6
4	Arkansas	4
2	Mississippi State	1
3	Auburn	2
6	Alabama	4
5	Ole Miss	5

Third round
1	LSU	3
3	Auburn	2
5	Ole Miss	2
2	Mississippi State	10

Semifinals
2	Mississippi State	5
3	Auburn	9

Final
1	LSU	5	-
3	Auburn	4	-

== All-Tournament Teams ==
Position	Player	School
Eastern Division
1B	Todd Helton	Tennessee
2B	Steve Soper	Tennessee
SS	Allan Parker	Tennessee
3B	Boomer Whipple	Vanderbilt
C	James Northeimer	Tennessee
C	Stephen Wix	Vanderbilt
OF	Jeff Abbott	Kentucky
OF	Nick Morrow	Vanderbilt
OF	Craig Sands	Vanderbilt
DH	Travis Hawkins	Georgia
P	Chris Ciaccio	Georgia
P	R. A. Dickey	Tennessee
Co-MVP	Todd Helton	Tennessee
Co-MVP	Steve Soper	Tennessee

Position	Player	School
Western Division
1B	Kenderick Moore	Arkansas
2B	Mark Bellhorn	Auburn
SS	Russ Johnson	LSU
3B	Shawn McNally	Auburn
C	Jeff Robinson	Ole Miss
OF	Kevin Ainsworth	LSU
OF	Frank Sanders	Auburn
OF	Ricky Joe Redd	Mississippi State
DH	Brad Wilson	LSU
P	John Powell	Auburn
P	Ryan Hala	Auburn
MVP	Russ Johnson	LSU

== See also ==
- College World Series
- NCAA Division I Baseball Championship
- Southeastern Conference baseball tournament
