= Battle Creek Yankees =

- 2003–2004; Battle Creek, Michigan

Minor league affiliations
- Class: Class A
- League: Midwest League
- Division: Eastern Division

Major league affiliations
- Team: New York Yankees

Team data
- Name: Battle Creek Yankees
- Ballpark: C.O. Brown Stadium

The Michigan Battle Cats of the Midwest League became the Battle Creek Yankees for the 2003 season. In 2005, their affiliation with the New York Yankees ended. They became an affiliate of the Tampa Bay Devil Rays known as the Southwest Michigan Devil Rays. The team played their home games in C.O. Brown Stadium in Battle Creek, Michigan.

== Team history ==
In 2003, the Michigan Battle Cats dropped their affiliation with the Houston Astros and became an affiliate of the New York Yankees. Along with the change in affiliation came a change in name, as they became known as the Battle Creek Yankees. Their first half season began inauspiciously as they finished 33–35, placing fifth in the six-team Eastern Division. For the season's second half, they improved to a 40–29 record, but still finished in second place in the division, 3 1/2 games behind the South Bend Silver Hawks. Despite not winning either half, they qualified for the three-round playoffs as a wildcard team. In the first round they beat the Fort Wayne Wizards two games to none. In the second round, however, they fell to the Lansing Lugnuts. First baseman Jason Drobiak hit .293 and led the league with 30 home runs. Pitcher José García went 9–8 with a 2.64 earned run average. The pitcher who would perhaps go on to the most success at the major league level, Manny Acosta, went 0–8 with a 6.64 earned run average and was released by the Yankees.

In 2004, the Battle Creek Yankees finished third in the first half with a 33–36 record. For the second half, they improved their record to 38–32, but they still finished in fourth place, two games behind, in a tight divisional race. They did not qualify for the playoffs. Outfielder Melky Cabrera hit .333 with no home runs in 42 games. Third baseman Eric Duncan hit .260 with 12 home runs. Catcher Omir Santos hit .240 with 2 home runs. Pitcher Tyler Clippard went 10–10 with a 3.44 earned run average and 145 strikeouts.

In September 2004, Battle Creek announced that it had signed a two-year player development contract with the Tampa Bay Devil Rays. The Devil Rays were new to the Midwest League; the Battle Creek franchise was replacing Charleston RiverDogs of the South Atlantic League as Tampa Bay's low-A affiliate. With the announcement, it was obvious that the team's name would need to change, and later they became the Southwest Michigan Devil Rays.

=== Year-by-year record ===
Year	Record	Finish	Manager	Playoffs
2003	73-64	3rd	Mitch Seoane	Lost in 2nd round
2004	71-68	9th	Mitch Seoane (13-18) / Bill Mosiello (58-50)	
