= John Massarelli =

American baseball player and coach (born 1966)

- Catcher
- Born: January 23, 1966 (age 60); Dover, Ohio, U.S.
- Batted: Right Threw: Right

debut
- 1997, for the Chianan Luka

Last appearance
- 1997, for the Chianan Luka

Career statistics
- Batting average: .289
- Home runs: 3
- RBI: 15
- Stats at Baseball Reference

Teams
- Chianan Luka (1997)

John David Massarelli (born January 23, 1966) is an American former professional baseball catcher. He played one season in the Taiwan Major League, ten seasons in Minor League Baseball, and later was a minor-league manager.

== Career ==
Prior to playing professionally, he attended Central Catholic High School and the University of Akron.

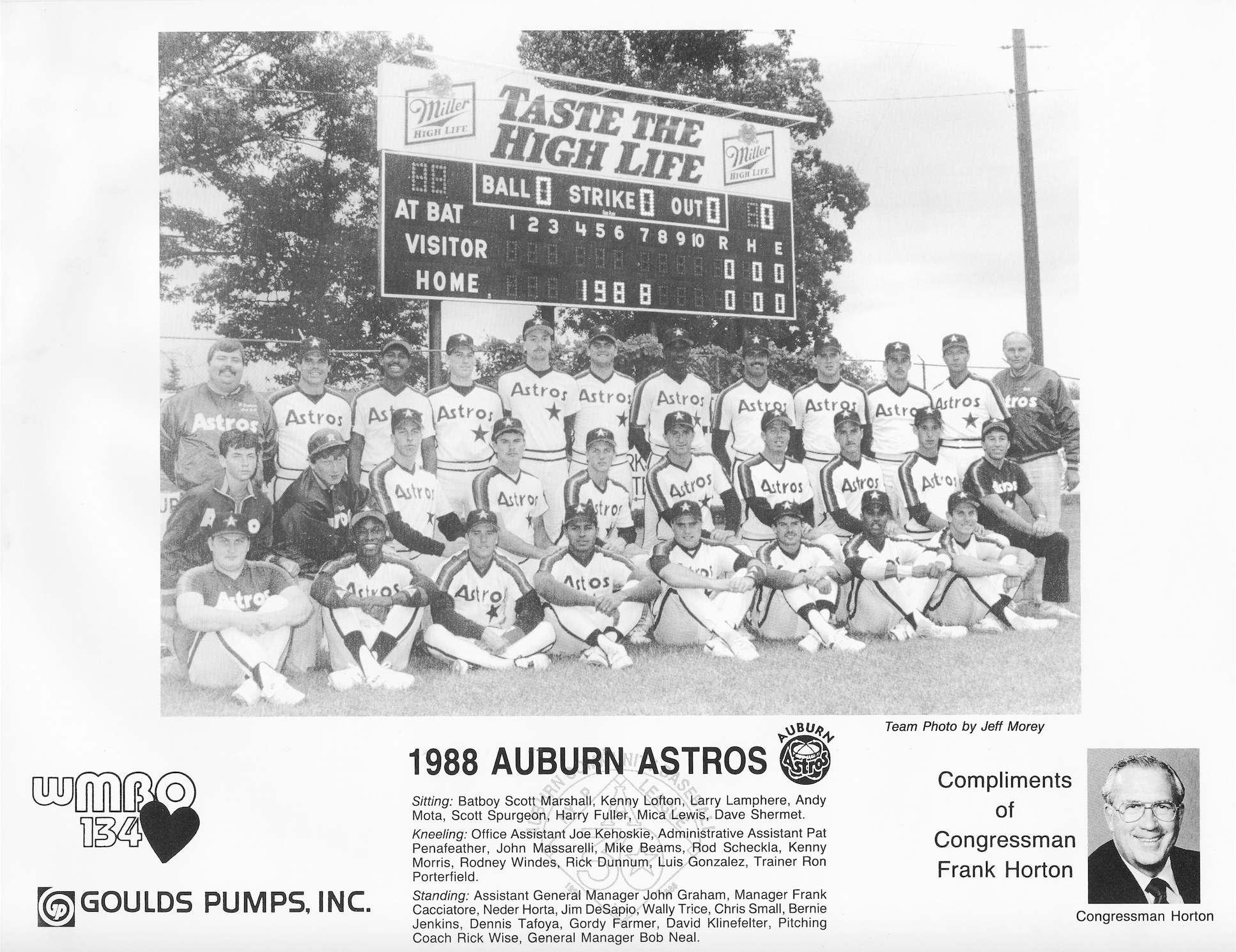
1988 Auburn Astros team photo

Massarelli was drafted by the Houston Astros in the eighth round of the 1987 Major League Baseball draft. He played in their system until 1993, making the Florida State League All-Star team in 1990. From 1994 to 1995, he played in the Florida Marlins system. He spent time in the Cleveland Indians system in 1995 as well and in 1996, he played in the San Diego Padres system. The outfielder/catcher played in 932 games in his decade-long career and he hit .271 with 19 home runs, 275 RBI and 288 stolen bases. He stole over 30 bases five times, peaking at 54 in a season. In 1997, he played in the Taiwan Major League.

Massarelli began his managing career in 2000, skippering the Auburn Doubledays of the Astros' farm system. In 2001 and 2002, he led the Michigan Battle Cats and in 2003, he managed the Salem Avalanche.

For the 2004 campaign, he moved to independent baseball, leading the Washington Wild Things, who he led until 2007. He did not manage in 2008, then in 2009 he joined the Lake Erie Crushers. He led the Crushers to a league championship victory in their inaugural 2009 season. In the offseason of 2013, he was hired by the Kansas City T-Bones.

In 2010, Massarelli was inducted into the Akron Baseball Hall of Fame. During the baseball offseason, he runs Massarelli Baseball School, a baseball and softball instructional facility that teaches students from Little League Baseball through high school.
