= 1994 Southland Conference baseball tournament =

- Teams: 4
- Format: Double-elimination
- Finals site: H. Alvin Brown–C. C. Stroud Field; Natchitoches, Louisiana
- Champions: Texas–San Antonio (1st title)
- Winning coach: Jimmy Shankle (1st title)
- MVP: Scott Pederson (Texas–San Antonio)

1994 Southland Conference baseball standings
	Conf.				Overall
Team	W		L	PCT	W		L	PCT
Northwestern State ‍†‍‍^{y}	16	–	5	.762	44	–	15	.746
Sam Houston State ‍‍‍	15	–	9	.625	29	–	24	.547
Texas–San Antonio ‍‍‡‍	12	–	8	.600	39	–	18	.684
McNeese State ‍‍‍	13	–	9	.591	47	–	17	.734
Texas–Arlington ‍‍‍	13	–	11	.542	25	–	29	.463
Nicholls State ‍‍‍	11	–	13	.458	27	–	27	.500
Southwest Texas State ‍‍‍	10	–	13	.435	28	–	23	.549
Stephen F. Austin ‍‍‍	7	–	17	.292	13	–	42	.236
Northeast Louisiana ‍‍‍	6	–	18	.250	20	–	33	.377
† – Conference champion ‡ – Tournament champion y – Invited to the NCAA tournament As of June 30, 1994; Rankings from Collegiate Baseball

The 1994 Southland Conference baseball tournament was held from May 15 to 19, 1994 to determine the champion of the Southland Conference in the sport of college baseball for the 1994 season. The event pitted the top four finishers from the conference's regular season in a double-elimination tournament held at H. Alvin Brown–C. C. Stroud Field on the campus of Northwestern State in Natchitoches, Louisiana. Third-seeded Texas–San Antonio won their first championship and claimed the automatic bid to the 1994 NCAA Division I baseball tournament.

== Seeding and format ==
The top four finishers from the regular season were seeded one through four. They played a double-elimination tournament.

Team	W	L	T	Pct	Seed
Northwestern State	16	5	.762	—	1
Sam Houston State	15	9	.625	2.5	2
Texas–San Antonio	12	8	.600	3.5	3
McNeese State	13	9	.591	3.5	4
Texas–Arlington	13	11	.542	4.5	—
Nicholls State	11	13	.458	6.5	—
Southwest Texas State	10	13	.435	7	—
Stephen F. Austin	7	17	.292	10.5	—
Northeast Louisiana	6	18	.250	11.5	—

== Bracket and results ==
Upper round 1
1	Northwestern State	2
4	McNeese State	8
3	Texas–San Antonio	3
2	Sam Houston State	2
Lower round 1
1	Northwestern State	7
2	Sam Houston State	4

Upper final
4	McNeese State	5
3	Texas–San Antonio	10
Lower final
1	Northwestern State	6
4	McNeese State	3

Final
3	Texas–San Antonio
1	Northwestern State

== All-Tournament Team ==
The following players were named to the All-Tournament Team.

Pos.	Name	School
P	Jeff Hutzler	Texas–San Antonio
P	Keith Moore	Northwestern State
C	Scotty Stafford	Northwestern State
1B	Brent Houtchens	Texas–San Antonio
2B	Damon Rapp	McNeese State
3B	Matt Donner	Northwestern State
SS	Brad Duncan	Northwestern State
OF	Scott Pederson	Texas–San Antonio
OF	Jason Lecronier	McNeese State
OF	Marco Guajardo	Northwestern State
DH	Tony Gee	Texas–San Antonio

=== Most Valuable Player ===
Scott Pederson was named Tournament Most Valuable Player. Pederson was an outfielder for Texas–San Antonio.
