= 1994 Midwestern Collegiate Conference baseball tournament =

- Teams: 6
- Format: Double-elimination
- Finals site: Frank Eck Stadium; Notre Dame, Indiana
- Champions: Notre Dame (5th title)
- Winning coach: Pat Murphy (5th title)
- MVP: Tom Price (Notre Dame)

1994 Midwestern Collegiate Conference baseball standings
	Conf.				Overall
Team	W		L	PCT	W		L	PCT
No. 18 Notre Dame ‍†‍‡‍^{y}	14	–	4	.778	46	–	16	.742
Butler ‍‍‍	11	–	8	.579	27	–	29	.482
Evansville ‍‍‍	10	–	8	.556	31	–	28	.525
Detroit ‍‍‍	10	–	10	.500	24	–	27	.471
Xavier ‍‍‍	5	–	10	.333	19	–	35	.352
La Salle ‍‍‍	3	–	13	.188	10	–	36	.217
† – Conference champion ‡ – Tournament champion y – Invited to the NCAA Tournament; As of June 30, 1994; Rankings from Collegiate Baseball

The 1994 Midwestern Collegiate Conference baseball tournament took place in May 1994, near the close of the 1994 NCAA Division I baseball season. All six of the league's teams met in the double-elimination tournament held at Frank Eck Stadium on the campus of Notre Dame in Notre Dame, Indiana. Top seeded Notre Dame won their fifth league championship, also their fourth in a row. They qualified for the 1994 NCAA Division I baseball tournament.

== Seeding and format ==
The league's teams are seeded one through six based on winning percentage, using conference games only. The top seed plays the sixth seed while the second seed plays the fifth seed and the third seed plays the fourth in the opening round.

Team	W	L	PCT	GB	Seed
Notre Dame	14	4	.778	—	1
Butler	11	8	.579	3.5	2
Evansville	10	5	.556	4	3
Detroit	10	10	.500	5	4
Xavier	5	10	.333	7.5	5
La Salle	3	13	.188	10	6

== Bracket and results ==
First round
1	Notre Dame	21
6	La Salle	1
3	Evansville	11
4	Detroit	6
2	Butler	12
5	Xavier	10

Second round
1	Notre Dame	6
4	Detroit	7
6	La Salle	3
5	Xavier	2
3	Evansville	11
2	Butler	3
1	Notre Dame	11
2	Butler	3

Third round
4	Detroit	17
6	La Salle	9
3	Evansville	3
1	Notre Dame	13

Semifinals
4	Detroit	4
3	Evansville	13

Final
3	Evansville	2
1	Notre Dame	10

== All-Tournament Team ==
The following players were named to the All-Tournament Team.

Pos	Name	School
P	Tom Price	Notre Dame
C	Bill McCann	Detroit
1B	Mike Pauldine	Detroit
2B	Aaron Devlin	Evansville
3B	Matt Haas	Notre Dame
SS	Paul Failla	Notre Dame
OF	Bryan Apolskis	Evansville
OF	Scott Sollmann	Notre Dame
OF	Ryan Topham	Notre Dame
DH	Jamie Lopiccolo	Detroit

=== Most Valuable Player ===
Tom Price of Notre Dame was named Most Valuable Player of the Tournament.
