= Michigan Battle Cats =

- 1995–2002; Battle Creek, Michigan
Team logo
Cap insignia

Minor league affiliations
- Class: Class A (1995–2002)
- League: Midwest League (1995–2002)

Major league affiliations
- Team: Houston Astros (1999–2002); Boston Red Sox (1995–1998)

Minor league titles
- League titles (1): 2000
- First-half titles (2): 1995; 2002
- Second-half titles (4): 1998; 1999; 2000; 2001

Team data
- Name: Michigan Battle Cats (1995–2002)
- Ballpark: C.O. Brown Stadium (1995–2002)

The Michigan Battle Cats were a Minor League Baseball team which began playing in the Midwest League in 1995 and called C.O. Brown Stadium in Battle Creek, Michigan, home. The franchise had previously been located in Madison, Wisconsin, in 1994 where they were called the Madison Hatters. Prior to that the team was located in Springfield, Illinois, and was known as the Springfield Cardinals. Upon moving to Battle Creek the team initially sought the name Battle Creek Golden Kazoos to help create a regional tie-in with the city of Kalamazoo, Michigan, but legal disputes led to the adoption of the Battle Cats moniker. The team became known as the Battle Creek Yankees beginning with their affiliation with the New York Yankees in 2003, and again changed names and affiliations in 2005 and became the Southwest Michigan Devil Rays. In 2007, citing declining attendance, the team moved to Midland, Michigan and became the Great Lakes Loons.

== Team history ==
=== Boston Red Sox affiliate: 1995 to 1998 ===
By September 1994, the city of Battle Creek had committed to stadium improvements in order to bring the Madison Hatters franchise to their city. C.O. Brown Stadium had been constructed in 1989 for amateur baseball, and it was substantially improved prior to obtaining the Midwest League franchise. After temporarily being known as the Battle Creek Golden Kazoos, the team adopted the name of Michigan Battle Cats. The team agreed to become an affiliate of the Boston Red Sox (the Madison Hatters had been affiliated with the St. Louis Cardinals, but St. Louis switched its Midwest League affiliate to Peoria).

The league also reorganized its 14 franchises from two divisions to three and adopted a three-round post-season playoff including first- and second-half winners from each division plus wildcards. Michigan played in the Eastern Division. The league's records recognize both the winner of the post-season playoffs and the team with the highest overall season record as champions.

In 1995, their first season, the Battle Cats won the first half division championship with a 36–32 record, while their second half record of 39–31 left them one game behind the Fort Wayne Wizards. Their overall season record of 75–63 was fourth in the league. In the first round of playoffs they beat Fort Wayne two games to none, and in the second round they defeated the West Michigan Whitecaps two games to one. In the championship round, however, they were swept in three games by the Beloit Snappers. Battle Cats manager DeMarlo Hale was named the league's Manager of the Year. Shortstop Donnie Sadler hit .283 with 9 home runs, led the league in runs scored with 103, and was named to the post-season all-star team. Pitcher Carl Pavano went 6–6 with a 3.44 earned run average and 138 strikeouts. The team's attendance, 171,794, was eighth in the 14-team league and a marked improvement over the Madison Hatters' attendance of 69,060 the year before.

The 1996 season was less successful, as the Battle Cats finished in fourth place in the five-team division in both the first and second halves, with a 31–38 in the first half and 29–40 in the second half. The only player from the 1996 team who went on to a long major league career was their weak-hitting shortstop, Rafael Betancourt (who hit just .167); he would later find success as a relief pitcher.

In 1997 the Battle Cats went 38–31 in the first half, but that was only good for second place, 11 games behind West Michigan. In the second half they dropped to fourth place with a 32–36 record. They nevertheless qualified for the playoffs as a wildcard team, but they lost in the first round to the Lansing Lugnuts two games to one. Second baseman Jim Chamblee hit .300 with 22 home runs and 73 runs batted in and led the league with 112 runs scored. First baseman Shea Hillenbrand hit .290 with 3 home runs. Pitcher Chris Reitsma went 4–1 with a 2.90 earned run average and 41 strikeouts.

In the first half of the 1998 season, the Battle Cats went 36–36 and finished in fourth place in the Eastern Division. In the second half, though, they improved to 43–25 and won the division. For the overall season they finished tied for second place in the standings for the entire league, four games behind the West Michigan Whitecaps. In the playoffs the Battle Cats lost to West Michigan in the first round, two games to one. Manager Billy Gardner, Jr. won the league's Manager of the Year award. Shea Hillenbrand moved to catcher and hit .349 with 19 home runs, leading the league with a .546 slugging percentage.

=== Houston Astros affiliate: 1999 to 2002 ===
In 1999, the Michigan Battle Cats switched their affiliation from the Boston Red Sox to the Houston Astros. Previously, the Quad City River Bandits had been the Astros' Midwest League affiliate. The Battle Cats finished the first half of the season in second place with a 35–34 record, but went 41–28 in the second half to win the division. In the first round of the playoffs they lost two games to none to Lansing. First baseman Aaron McNeal hit .310, led the league in hits (with 166), home runs (with 38), and runs batted in (with 131), and captured the league's Most Valuable Player award. Second baseman Aaron Miles hit .317 with 10 home runs and was named, along with McNeal, to the post-season all-star team. Pitcher Roy Oswalt went 13–4 with a 4.46 earned run average and 143 strikeouts, and Tim Redding went 8–6 with a 4.97 earned run average and 141 strikeouts.

In 2000, the Midwest League reorganized into two divisions; Michigan played in the six-team Eastern Division, while the Western Division comprised the other eight teams. The playoffs continued to last three rounds and to include eight teams. In the first half, the Battle Cats' 34–34 record placed them in fourth place in their division, but in the second half they won the division with a 48–22 record. (Their overall season record of 82–56 was second in the league.) In the playoffs, they beat the Fort Wayne Wizards in the first round, two games to one, and the Dayton Dragons in the second round, two games to none. In the championship round they swept the Beloit Snappers in three straight games to become the Midwest League champions. Catcher John Buck hit .282 with 10 home runs. Left fielder Jason Lane hit .299 with 23 home runs and his 104 runs batted in tied for the league lead. Pitcher Carlos Hernández went 6–6 with a 3.82 earned run average and 115 strikeouts. On May 28, Hernández pitched a no-hitter, beating the West Michigan Whitecaps 2–0.

The next season the Battle Cats finished the first half in second place in the division with a 38–30 record, two games behind. They won the division in the second half, 44–25. In the playoffs they lost in the first round to the South Bend Silver Hawks, two games to none. Shortstop Chris Burke hit .300 with 3 home runs. Pitcher Chad Qualls tied for the league lead in victories, going 15–6 with a 3.72 earned run average and 125 strikeouts. Despite the on-field success, attendance continued to drop, as it had almost every seasonsince the franchise had moved to Battle Creek, and only 66,088 fans attended. For the second straight summer the team was sold.

In 2002, the Battle Cats won the Eastern Division's first half with a 42–28 record. They finished the second half tied for third with a 37–33 record. In the playoffs, they lost in the first round to Lansing, two games to one. Pitcher Mike Burns went 14–9 with a 2.49 earned run average, and D. J. Houlton went 14–5 with a 3.14 earned run average. The team was sold again and after the season they switched their affiliation to the New York Yankees and renamed the franchise as the Battle Creek Yankees.

== Notable alumni ==
- Rafael Betancourt (1996)
- Chris Burke (2001)
- Billy Gardner (1997–1998, MGR)
- Shea Hillenbrand (1997)
- Aaron Miles (1999)
- Roy Oswalt (1999)
- Carl Pavano (1995)
- Chad Qualls (2001)
- Tim Redding (1999)
- Johan Santana (1999) 2 × AL Cy Young Award (2004, 2006)

=== Year-by-year record ===
Year	Record	Finish	Manager	Playoffs
1995	75-62	4th	DeMarlo Hale	Lost League Finals
1996	60-78	13th	Tom Barrett	
1997	70-67	4th	Billy Gardner, Jr.	Lost in 1st round
1998	79-61	2nd (t)	Billy Gardner, Jr.	Lost in 1st round
1999	76-62	3rd	Al Pedrique	Lost in 1st round
2000	82-56	2nd	Al Pedrique	League Champs
2001	82-55	3rd	John Massarelli	Lost in 1st round
2002	79-61	4th	John Massarelli	Lost in 1st round
