= 1993 Midwestern Collegiate Conference baseball tournament =

- Teams: 8
- Format: Double-elimination
- Finals site: Stanley Coveleski Regional Stadium; South Bend, Indiana
- Champions: Notre Dame (4th title)
- Winning coach: Pat Murphy (4th title)
- MVP: Eric Danapolis (Notre Dame)

1993 Midwestern Collegiate Conference baseball standings
	Conf.						Overall
Team	W		L		T	PCT	W		L		T	PCT
No. 11 Notre Dame ‍†‍‡‍^{y}	23	–	4	–	0	.852	46	–	16	–	0	.742
Detroit ‍‍‍	20	–	8	–	0	.714	29	–	21	–	0	.580
Evansville ‍‍‍	19	–	8	–	0	.704	43	–	18	–	0	.705
Butler ‍‍‍	14	–	14	–	0	.500	27	–	27	–	1	.500
Xavier ‍‍‍	12	–	16	–	0	.429	19	–	40	–	0	.322
Dayton ‍‍‍	10	–	18	–	0	.357	22	–	39	–	0	.361
La Salle ‍‍‍	8	–	20	–	0	.286	13	–	31	–	0	.295
Duquesne ‍‍‍	5	–	23	–	0	.179	9	–	32	–	0	.220
† – Conference champion ‡ – Tournament champion y – Invited to the NCAA Tournament; As of June 30, 1993; Rankings from Collegiate Baseball

The 1993 Midwestern Collegiate Conference baseball tournament took place in May 1993, near the close of the 1993 NCAA Division I baseball season. All eight of the league's teams met in the double-elimination tournament held at Stanley Coveleski Regional Stadium home stadium of Notre Dame in South Bend, Indiana. Top seeded Notre Dame won their fourth league championship, also their third of four in a row. They qualified for the 1993 NCAA Division I baseball tournament.

== Seeding and format ==
The league's teams are seeded one through eight based on winning percentage, using conference games only. The top seed plays the eighth seed while the second seed plays the seventh seed and so on in the opening round.

Team	W	L	PCT	GB	Seed
Notre Dame	23	4	.852	—	1
Detroit	20	8	.714	3.5	2
Evansville	19	8	.704	4	3
Butler	14	14	.500	9.5	4
Xavier	12	16	.429	11.5	5
Dayton	10	18	.357	13.5	6
La Salle	8	20	.286	15.5	7
Duquesne	5	23	.179	18.5	8

== Bracket and results ==
Upper round 1
1	Notre Dame	18
8	Duquesne	4
4	Butler	12
5	Xavier	6
3	Evansville	5
6	Dayton	1
2	Detroit	10
7	La Salle	5

Upper round 2
1	Notre Dame	12
4	Butler	5
3	Evansville	1
2	Detroit	4
Lower round 1
8	Duquesne	3
5	Xavier	7
6	Dayton	13
7	La Salle	5

Upper final
1	Notre Dame	14
2	Detroit	8
Lower round 2
3	Evansville	9
5	Xavier	7
4	Butler	5
6	Dayton	7

Semifinals
1	Notre Dame	1
3	Evansville	5
2	Detroit	4
6	Dayton	9

Preliminary final
3	Evansville	15
6	Dayton	14

Final
1	Notre Dame	22
3	Evansville	5

== All-Tournament Team ==
The following players were named to the All-Tournament Team.

Pos	Name	School
P	Greg Willming	Evansville
P	Tom Price	Notre Dame
C	Rich Dimel	Dayton
1B	Pat Schulz	Evansville
2B	Greg Layson	Notre Dame
3B	Matt Haas	Notre Dame
SS	Paul Fialla	Notre Dame
OF	Eric Danapilis	Notre Dame
OF	Ed Hartwell	Notre Dame
OF	Marty Watson	Evansville
DH	Larry Hisle	Dayton
UT	Clint Straub	Detroit

=== Most Valuable Player ===
Eric Danapolis of Notre Dame was named Most Valuable Player of the Tournament.
