= 1993 Colonial Athletic Association baseball tournament =

American college baseball tournament

- Teams: 6
- Format: Double-elimination tournament
- Finals site: Brooks Field; Wilmington, North Carolina
- Champions: East Carolina (5th title)
- Winning coach: Gary Overton (5th title)
- MVP: Lyle Hartgrove (East Carolina)

1993 Colonial Athletic Association baseball standings
| | Conf. | | | | | | Overall |
| Team | W | | L | | T | PCT | W | | L | | T | PCT |
|---|---|---|---|---|---|---|---|---|---|---|---|---|
| George Mason ‍†‍‍^{y} | 10 | – | 1 | – | 0 | .909 | 33 | – | 15 | – | 0 | .688 |
| Old Dominion ‍‍‍ | 9 | – | 3 | – | 0 | .750 | 31 | – | 11 | – | 0 | .738 |
| East Carolina ‍‍‡‍^{y} | 11 | – | 7 | – | 0 | .611 | 41 | – | 19 | – | 0 | .683 |
| UNC Wilmington ‍‍‍ | 6 | – | 8 | – | 0 | .429 | 26 | – | 29 | – | 0 | .473 |
| James Madison ‍‍‍ | 3 | – | 7 | – | 1 | .318 | 24 | – | 24 | – | 1 | .500 |
| Richmond ‍‍‍ | 3 | – | 8 | – | 1 | .292 | 29 | – | 18 | – | 1 | .615 |
| William & Mary ‍‍‍ | 3 | – | 12 | – | 0 | .200 | 24 | – | 19 | – | 1 | .557 |
† – Conference champion ‡ – Tournament champion y – Invited to the NCAA tournament As of June 30, 1993; Rankings from Collegiate Baseball

The 1993 Colonial Athletic Association baseball tournament was held at Brooks Field on the campus of UNC Wilmington in Wilmington, North Carolina, from May 19 through 23. The event determined the champion of the Colonial Athletic Association for the 1993 season. Third-seeded East Carolina won the tournament for the fifth time and earned the CAA's automatic bid to the 1993 NCAA Division I baseball tournament.

Entering the event, East Carolina had won the most championships, with four. George Mason had won two and Richmond had won once.

== Format and seeding ==
The CAA's six teams were seeded one to six based on winning percentage from the conference's round robin regular season. As the CAA had seven teams, the last-place finisher, William & Mary, did not qualify for the tournament. They played a double-elimination tournament.

| Team | W | L | T | Pct. | GB | Seed |
|---|---|---|---|---|---|---|
| George Mason | 10 | 1 | 0 | .909 | — | 1 |
| Old Dominion | 9 | 3 | 0 | .750 | 1.5 | 2 |
| East Carolina | 11 | 7 | 0 | .611 | 2.5 | 3 |
| UNC Wilmington | 6 | 8 | 0 | .429 | 5.5 | 4 |
| James Madison | 3 | 7 | 1 | .318 | 6.5 | 5 |
| Richmond | 3 | 8 | 1 | .292 | 7 | 6 |
| William & Mary | 3 | 12 | 0 | .200 | 9 | — |

== Bracket and results ==
First round
1 | George Mason | 5
6 | Richmond | 1
3 | East Carolina | 3
4 | UNC Wilmington | 2
2 | Old Dominion | 8
5 | James Madison | 13^{10}

Second round
1 | George Mason | 8
4 | UNC Wilmington | 1
3 | East Carolina | 8
5 | James Madison | 4
6 | Richmond | 3^{11}
2 | Old Dominion | 2

Third round
1 | George Mason | 4
3 | East Carolina | 7
5 | James Madison | 5
6 | Richmond | 1

Semifinals
1 | George Mason | 15
5 | James Madison | 4

Final
3 | East Carolina | 9 | —
1 | George Mason | 4 | —

== Most Valuable Player ==
Lyle Hartgrove was named Tournament Most Valuable Player. Hartgrove was a pitcher for East Carolina.
