= 1994 Colonial Athletic Association baseball tournament =

American college baseball tournament

- Teams: 7
- Format: Double-elimination tournament
- Finals site: Bud Metheny Baseball Complex; Norfolk, Virginia
- Champions: Old Dominion (1st title)
- Winning coach: Pat McMahon (1st title)
- MVP: Matt Quataro (Old Dominion)

1994 Colonial Athletic Association baseball standings
	Conf.						Overall
Team	W		L		T	PCT	W		L		T	PCT
No. 30 Old Dominion ‍†‍‡‍^{y}	14	–	4	–	0	.778	40	–	14	–	0	.741
James Madison ‍‍‍	11	–	7	–	0	.611	40	–	19	–	1	.675
Richmond ‍‍‍	11	–	7	–	0	.611	36	–	19	–	0	.655
UNC Wilmington ‍‍‍	10	–	8	–	0	.556	30	–	28	–	0	.517
East Carolina ‍‍‍	8	–	9	–	0	.471	36	–	18	–	0	.667
William & Mary ‍‍‍	7	–	11	–	0	.389	24	–	23	–	1	.510
George Mason ‍‍‍	1	–	16	–	0	.059	18	–	32	–	1	.363
† – Conference champion ‡ – Tournament champion y – Invited to the NCAA tournament As of June 30, 1994; Rankings from Collegiate Baseball

The 1994 Colonial Athletic Association baseball tournament was held at Bud Metheny Baseball Complex on the campus of Old Dominion in Norfolk, Virginia, from May 18 through 22. The event determined the champion of the Colonial Athletic Association for the 1994 season. Top-seeded Old Dominion won the tournament for the first time and earned the CAA's automatic bid to the 1994 NCAA Division I baseball tournament.

Entering the event, East Carolina had won the most championships, with five. George Mason had won two and Richmond had won once.

== Format and seeding ==
The CAA's seven teams were seeded one to seven based on winning percentage from the conference's round robin regular season. This was the format used in 1992, although abandoned in 1993 in favor of only the top six teams. They played a double-elimination tournament.

Team	W	L	Pct.	GB	Seed
Old Dominion	14	4	.778	—	1
James Madison	11	7	.611	3	2
Richmond	11	7	.611	3	3
UNC Wilmington	10	8	.556	4	4
East Carolina	8	9	.471	5.5	5
William & Mary	7	11	.389	7	6
George Mason	1	16	.059	12.5	7

== Bracket and results ==
Upper round 1
4	UNC Wilmington	3
5	East Carolina	4
3	Richmond	11
6	William & Mary	2
2	James Madison	6
7	George Mason	2

Upper round 2
1	Old Dominion	15
5	East Carolina	4
3	Richmond	3
2	James Madison	2
Lower round 1
6	William & Mary	8
7	George Mason	9

Upper final
1	Old Dominion	1^{10}
3	Richmond	0
Lower round 2
5	East Carolina	4
7	George Mason	3
2	James Madison	7
4	UNC Wilmington	0

Semifinals
1	Old Dominion	1
2	James Madison	2
3	Richmond	6
5	East Carolina	2

Preliminary final
2	James Madison	5
3	Richmond	3

Final
1	Old Dominion	5
2	James Madison	2

== Most Valuable Player ==
Matt Quataro was named Tournament Most Valuable Player. Quataro played first base and outfield for Old Dominion.
