= 1993 Ivy League Baseball Championship Series =

1993 Ivy League baseball tournament
- Teams: 2
- Format: Best of three series
- Finals site: Palmer Field; Middletown, Connecticut
- Champions: Yale (1st title)
- Winning coach: John Stuper (1st title)

1993 Ivy League baseball standings
	Conf.				Overall
Team	W		L	PCT	W		L	PCT
Lou Gehrig
Columbia ^{x}‍‍‍	11	–	9	.550	19	–	21	.475
Penn ‍‍‍	10	–	10	.500	17	–	19	.472
Princeton ‍‍‍	10	–	10	.500	16	–	25	.390
Cornell ‍‍‍	3	–	17	.150	6	–	29	.171
Red Rolfe
Yale ^{x}‍‍‡‍^{y}	16	–	4	.800	33	–	11	.750
Harvard ‍‍‍	12	–	8	.600	18	–	20	.474
Brown ‍‍‍	10	–	10	.500	13	–	27	.325
Dartmouth ‍‍‍	8	–	12	.400	14	–	19	.424
x – Division champion ‡ – Championship Series champion y – Invited to the NCAA tournament As of June 30, 1993; Rankings from Collegiate Baseball

The 1993 Ivy League Baseball Championship Series was a postseason baseball tournament for the Ivy League in the 1993 NCAA Division I baseball season. The inaugural Baseball Championship Series took place on May 8, 1993 and was held at Palmer Field in Middletown, Connecticut. It was the first season that the Ivy League sponsored baseball after Army and Navy departed the Eastern Intercollegiate Baseball League. The series matched the regular season champions of each of the league's two divisions. Yale, the winner of the series, claimed their first title and the Ivy League's automatic berth in the 1993 NCAA Division I baseball tournament.

== Results ==
Finals
Columbia	7	1	—
Yale	17	11	—
