= 1993 Big Ten baseball tournament =

1993 Big Ten Conference baseball tournament
- Teams: 4
- Format: Double-elimination
- Finals site: C. O. Brown Stadium; Battle Creek, MI
- Champions: Minnesota (5th title)
- Winning coach: John Anderson (5th title)
- MVP: Matt Beaumont (Ohio State)

1993 Big Ten Conference baseball standings
	Conf.				Overall
Team	W		L	PCT	W		L	PCT
No. 12 Ohio State ‍†‍‍^{y}	19	–	9	.679	44	–	19	.698
Minnesota ‍‍‡‍^{y}	17	–	9	.654	43	–	18	.705
Purdue ‍‍‍	16	–	12	.571	36	–	22	.621
Indiana ‍‍‍	15	–	12	.556	38	–	21	.644
Northwestern ‍‍‍	15	–	13	.536	27	–	27	.500
Iowa ‍‍‍	13	–	13	.500	32	–	20	.615
Michigan ‍‍‍	13	–	14	.481	25	–	30	.455
Michigan State ‍‍‍	12	–	16	.429	31	–	23	.574
Illinois ‍‍‍	12	–	16	.429	32	–	23	.582
Penn State ‍‍‍	5	–	23	.179	15	–	28	.349
x – Division champion ‡ – Tournament champion y – Invited to the NCAA tournament As of June 30, 1993; Rankings from Collegiate Baseball

The 1993 Big Ten Conference baseball tournament was held at C. O. Brown Stadium in Battle Creek, Michigan, from May 15 through 19. The top four teams from the regular season participated in the double-elimination tournament, the thirteenth annual tournament sponsored by the Big Ten Conference to determine the league champion. The title game was rained out, and Minnesota was declared champion by virtue of their 2–0 record through the first two rounds while Ohio State held a 2–1 record. The Gophers claimed their fifth tournament championship and earned the Big Ten Conference's automatic bid to the 1993 NCAA Division I baseball tournament. This was also the first time the tournament was held outside the home venue of a conference member.

== Format and seeding ==
The 1993 tournament was a 4-team double-elimination tournament, with seeds determined by conference regular season winning percentage only.

Team	W	L	PCT	GB	Seed
Ohio State	19	9	.679	–	1
Minnesota	17	9	.654	1	2
Purdue	16	12	.571	3	3
Indiana	15	12	.556	3.5	4
Northwestern	15	13	.536	4	–
Iowa	13	13	.500	5	–
Michigan	13	14	.481	5.5	–
Michigan State	12	16	.429	7	–
Illinois	12	16	.429	7	–
Penn State	5	23	.179	14	–

== Tournament ==
Upper round 1
1	Ohio State	3^{10}
4	Indiana	2
2	Minnesota	8
3	Purdue	3
Lower round 1
4	Indiana	11
3	Purdue	9

Upper final
1	Ohio State	2
2	Minnesota	11
Lower final
1	Ohio State	15
4	Indiana	3

Final
2	Minnesota	6	(Note: Game 7 was rained out. Minnesota declared champion due to their 2–0 record through the first two rounds.)
1	Ohio State	7^{10}

== All-Tournament Team ==
The following players were named to the All-Tournament Team.

Pos	Name	School
P	Andy Hammerschmidt	Minnesota
P	Matt Beaumont	Ohio State
C	Darren Grass	Minnesota
1B	Jonathan Sweet	Ohio State
2B	Brad Young	Ohio State
SS	Bob Mobilla	Minnesota
OF	Ryan Lefebvre	Minnesota
OF	Charlie Nelson	Minnesota
OF	Mark Repasky	Ohio State
DH	Brian Mannino	Ohio State

=== Most Outstanding Player ===
Matt Beaumont was named Most Outstanding Player. Beaumont was a pitcher for Ohio State.
