= 1993 Southland Conference baseball tournament =

- Teams: 4
- Format: Double-elimination
- Finals site: H. Alvin Brown–C. C. Stroud Field; Natchitoches, Louisiana
- Champions: McNeese State (1st title)
- Winning coach: Tony Robichaux (1st title)
- MVP: Clint Gould (McNeese State)

1993 Southland Conference baseball standings
| | Conf. | | | | | | Overall |
| Team | W | | L | | T | PCT | W | | L | | T | PCT |
|---|---|---|---|---|---|---|---|---|---|---|---|---|
| Northwestern State ‍†‍‍ | 18 | – | 6 | – | 0 | .750 | 40 | – | 14 | – | 0 | .741 |
| Texas–Arlington ‍‍‍ | 17 | – | 6 | – | 0 | .739 | 34 | – | 20 | – | 0 | .630 |
| Sam Houston State ‍‍‍ | 13 | – | 9 | – | 0 | .591 | 30 | – | 26 | – | 0 | .536 |
| McNeese State ‍‍‡‍^{y} | 14 | – | 10 | – | 0 | .583 | 38 | – | 23 | – | 0 | .623 |
| Nicholls State ‍‍‍ | 11 | – | 12 | – | 0 | .478 | 31 | – | 19 | – | 0 | .620 |
| Stephen F. Austin ‍‍‍ | 10 | – | 14 | – | 0 | .417 | 21 | – | 32 | – | 0 | .396 |
| Texas–San Antonio ‍‍‍ | 9 | – | 15 | – | 0 | .375 | 21 | – | 34 | – | 0 | .382 |
| Southwest Texas State ‍‍‍ | 8 | – | 15 | – | 0 | .348 | 26 | – | 29 | – | 0 | .473 |
| Northeast Louisiana ‍‍‍ | 5 | – | 18 | – | 0 | .217 | 13 | – | 26 | – | 1 | .338 |
† – Conference champion ‡ – Tournament champion y – Invited to the NCAA tournament As of June 30, 1993; Rankings from Collegiate Baseball

The 1993 Southland Conference baseball tournament was held from May 16 to 18, 1993 to determine the champion of the Southland Conference in the sport of college baseball for the 1993 season. The event pitted the top four finishers from the conference's regular season in a double-elimination tournament held at H. Alvin Brown–C. C. Stroud Field on the campus of Northwestern State in Natchitoches, Louisiana. Fourth-seeded McNeese State won their first championship and claimed the automatic bid to the 1993 NCAA Division I baseball tournament.

== Seeding and format ==
The top six finishers from the regular season were seeded one through six. They played a double-elimination tournament.

| Team | W | L | T | Pct | Seed |
|---|---|---|---|---|---|
| Northwestern State | 18 | 6 | .750 | — | 1 |
| Texas–Arlington | 17 | 6 | .739 | 0.5 | 2 |
| Sam Houston State | 13 | 9 | .591 | 4 | 3 |
| McNeese State | 14 | 10 | .583 | 4 | 4 |
| Nicholls State | 11 | 12 | .478 | 6.5 | — |
| Stephen F. Austin | 10 | 14 | .417 | 8 | — |
| Texas–San Antonio | 9 | 15 | .375 | 9 | — |
| Southwest Texas State | 8 | 15 | .348 | 9.5 | — |
| Northeast Louisiana | 5 | 18 | .217 | 12.5 | — |

== Bracket and results ==
Upper round 1
1 | Northwestern State | 2
4 | McNeese State | 4
3 | Sam Houston State | 4
2 | Texas–Arlington | 2
Lower round 1
1 | Northwestern State | 6
2 | Texas–Arlington | 12

Upper final
4 | McNeese State | 11
3 | Sam Houston State | 1
Lower final
3 | Sam Houston State | 6
2 | Texas–Arlington | 1

Final
4 | McNeese State | 3 | —
3 | Sam Houston State | 2 | —

== All-Tournament Team ==
The following players were named to the All-Tournament Team.

| Pos. | Name | School |
|---|---|---|
| P | Nolan Nicholls | Sam Houston State |
| P | Greg Garner | McNeese State |
| C | Ryan Robertson | McNeese State |
| 1B | Clint Gould | McNeese State |
| 2B | Karl Heckendorn | Texas–Arlington |
| 3B | Kyle Shade | Northwestern State |
| SS | Trent Bourque | McNeese State |
| OF | Bobby Johnson | Sam Houston State |
| OF | Scott Hiers | McNeese State |
| OF | Deron Hofstetter | McNeese State |
| DH | Chris Mayfield | McNeese State |

=== Most Valuable Player ===
Clint Gould was named Tournament Most Valuable Player. Gould was a first baseman for McNeese State.
