= 1994 Florida Gators baseball team =

American college baseball season

1994 Florida Gators baseball

Atlantic I Regional, 3–2
- Conference: Southeastern Conference

Ranking
- Coaches: No. 23
- CB: No. 21
- Record: 40–23 (16–9 SEC)
- Head coach: Joe Arnold (11th year)
- Home stadium: Alfred A. McKethan Stadium

1994 Southeastern Conference baseball standings
	Conf.				Overall
Team	W		L	PCT	W		L	PCT
Eastern
No. 10 Tennessee ^{x}‍†‍‡‍^{y}	24	–	5	.828	52	–	14	.788
No. 21 Florida ‍‍‍^{y}	16	–	9	.640	40	–	23	.635
Kentucky ‍‍‍	11	–	14	.440	32	–	25	.561
South Carolina ‍‍‍	11	–	15	.423	35	–	23	.603
Vanderbilt ‍‍‍	10	–	20	.333	28	–	30	.483
Georgia ‍‍‍	9	–	19	.321	22	–	35	.386
Western
No. 7 LSU ^{x}‍‍‡‍^{y}	21	–	6	.778	46	–	20	.697
Mississippi State ‍‍‍	15	–	12	.556	36	–	23	.610
No. 8 Auburn ‍‍‍^{y}	16	–	13	.552	44	–	21	.677
Arkansas ‍‍‍	13	–	13	.500	30	–	27	.526
Ole Miss ‍‍‍	12	–	14	.462	30	–	26	.536
Alabama ‍‍‍	4	–	22	.154	21	–	35	.375
x – Division champion † – Conference champion ‡ – Tournament champion y – Invited to the NCAA tournament As of June 30, 1994; Rankings from Collegiate Baseball

The 1994 Florida Gators baseball team represented the University of Florida in the sport of baseball during the 1994 college baseball season. The Gators competed in Division I of the National Collegiate Athletic Association (NCAA) and the Eastern Division of the Southeastern Conference (SEC). They played their home games at Alfred A. McKethan Stadium, on the university's Gainesville, Florida campus. The team was coached by Joe Arnold, who was in his 11th and final season at Florida.

== Roster ==
1994 Florida Gators baseball team
Players
Coaches

#	Pos.	Name	B/T	Height	Weight	Year	Home town
37	RHP	Rob Bonanno	L/R	6 ft 0 in (1.83 m)	195 lb (88 kg)	Sr	Tampa, FL
	OF	Todd Brown	S/R	5 ft 11 in (1.8 m)	165 lb (75 kg)	Sr	Venice, FL
35	C	Eric Castaldo	R/R	6 ft 1 in (1.85 m)	180 lb (82 kg)	So	Altamonte Springs, FL
	LHP	Robert Dodd	L/L	6 ft 3 in (1.91 m)	195 lb (88 kg)	Fr	Plano, TX
5	OF	Brian Duva	S/R	5 ft 9 in (1.75 m)	170 lb (77 kg)	Sr	Gainesville, FL
18	INF	David Eckstein	R/R	5 ft 9 in (1.75 m)	160 lb (73 kg)	Fr	Sanford, FL
	OF	James Eidam	S/R	5 ft 11 in (1.8 m)	194 lb (88 kg)	Jr	Huntington Beach, CA
	LHP	John Kaufman	L/L	5 ft 10 in (1.78 m)	170 lb (77 kg)	Fr	Tampa, FL
	OF	Dean Kent	R/R	6 ft 4 in (1.93 m)	217 lb (98 kg)	Fr	Oldsmar, FL
12	INF	Chris Kokinda	R/R	6 ft 1 in (1.85 m)	202 lb (92 kg)	Jr	West Palm Beach, FL
13	INF	Tripp MacKay	S/R	5 ft 10 in (1.78 m)	170 lb (77 kg)	So	Mount Pleasant, TX
	C	Brandon Marsters	R/R	5 ft 11 in (1.8 m)	206 lb (93 kg)	Fr	Sarasota, FL
	RHP	Darren McClellan	R/R	6 ft 2 in (1.88 m)	210 lb (95 kg)	Fr	Seminole, FL
34	RHP	Sean McClellan	R/R	6 ft 2 in (1.88 m)	215 lb (98 kg)	So	Seminole, FL
	RHP	Matt Parker	R/R	6 ft 1 in (1.85 m)	180 lb (82 kg)	So	Tampa, FL
27	INF	Chan Perry	R/R	6 ft 2 in (1.88 m)	200 lb (91 kg)	So	Mayo, FL
	RHP	Stan Stewart	R/R	6 ft 5 in (1.96 m)	191 lb (87 kg)	Jr	Gainesville, FL
	INF	John Tamargo	L/R	5 ft 10 in (1.78 m)	188 lb (85 kg)	Fr	Tampa, FL
	INF	Chris Wiggs	R/R	5 ft 11 in (1.8 m)	186 lb (84 kg)	Fr	Lakeland, FL

Head coach

Joe Arnold

Assistant coach(es)

—

Legend

- (C) Team captain
- (S) Suspended
- (I) Ineligible
- Injured
- Current redshirt

Roster
