= 1993 Trans America Athletic Conference baseball tournament =

American college baseball tournament

- Teams: 4
- Format: Double-elimination
- Finals site: Conrad Park; DeLand, Florida
- Champions: UCF (1st title)
- Winning coach: Jay Bergman (1st title)
- MVP: Tony Marrillia (UCF)

1993 Trans America Athletic Conference baseball standings
| | Conf. | | | | | | Overall |
| Team | W | | L | | T | PCT | W | | L | | T | PCT |
|---|---|---|---|---|---|---|---|---|---|---|---|---|
East
| Stetson ^{x}‍‍‍ | 11 | – | 7 | – | 0 | .611 | 38 | – | 17 | – | 0 | .691 |
| UCF ‍‍‡‍^{y} | 9 | – | 9 | – | 0 | .500 | 31 | – | 31 | – | 0 | .500 |
| College of Charleston ‍‍‍ | 9 | – | 9 | – | 0 | .500 | 18 | – | 24 | – | 0 | .429 |
| FIU ‍‍‍ | 7 | – | 11 | – | 0 | .389 | 27 | – | 29 | – | 0 | .482 |
West
| Southeastern Louisiana ^{x}‍†‍‍ | 19 | – | 5 | – | 0 | .792 | 38 | – | 17 | – | 0 | .691 |
| Centenary ‍‍‍ | 15 | – | 8 | – | 0 | .652 | 27 | – | 25 | – | 0 | .519 |
| Samford ‍‍‍ | 9 | – | 15 | – | 0 | .375 | 16 | – | 32 | – | 1 | .337 |
| Georgia State ‍‍‍ | 7 | – | 14 | – | 0 | .333 | 12 | – | 35 | – | 0 | .255 |
| Mercer ‍‍‍ | 6 | – | 14 | – | 0 | .300 | 15 | – | 34 | – | 0 | .306 |
x – Division champion † – Conference champion ‡ – Tournament champion y – Invited to the NCAA tournament As of June 30, 1993; Rankings from Collegiate Baseball

The 1993 Trans America Athletic Conference baseball tournament was held at Conrad Park on the campus of Stetson University in DeLand, Florida. This was the fifteenth tournament championship held by the Trans America Athletic Conference, in its fifteenth year of existence. UCF won their first tournament championship in their first year in the league and earned the conference's automatic bid to the 1993 NCAA Division I baseball tournament.

== Format and seeding ==
The top two finishers from each division by conference winning percentage qualified for the tournament, with the top seed from one division playing the second seed from the opposite in the first round.

| Team | W | L | Pct. | GB | Seed |
|---|---|---|---|---|---|
East
| Stetson | 11 | 7 | .611 | — | 1E |
| UCF | 9 | 9 | .500 | 2 | 2E |
| College of Charleston | 9 | 9 | .500 | 2 | — |
| FIU | 7 | 11 | .389 | 4 | — |

| Team | W | L | Pct. | GB | Seed |
|---|---|---|---|---|---|
West
| Southeastern Louisiana | 19 | 5 | .792 | — | 1W |
| Centenary | 15 | 8 | .652 | 3.5 | 2W |
| Samford | 9 | 15 | .375 | 10 | — |
| Georgia State | 7 | 14 | .333 | 10.5 | — |
| Mercer | 6 | 14 | .300 | 11 | — |

== Bracket ==
First round
1E | Stetson | 4
2W | Centenary | 5^{11}
1W | Southeastern Louisiana | 2
2E | UCF | 4
Lower round 1
1E | Stetson | 11
1W | Southeastern Louisiana | 5

Semi-finals
2W | Centenary | 2
2E | UCF | 5
Lower final
2W | Centenary | 14
1E | Stetson | 4

Finals
2E | UCF | 3 | 13
2W | Centenary | 5 | 2

== All-Tournament Team ==
The following players were named to the All-Tournament Team.

| POS | Player | School |
|---|---|---|
| P | Jeremy Hadley | Centenary |
| P | Jason Schlutt | UCF |
| C | Gabe DeLaCruz | Centenary |
| 1B | Todd Tocco | UCF |
| 2B | Tim Kroeker | Centenary |
| 3B | Craig Corbett | Stetson |
| 3B | Brian Stier | Centenary |
| SS | Kiley Hughes | Southeastern Louisiana |
| OF | Aaron Iatarola | Stetson |
| OF | Tony Marrillia | UCF |
| OF | Alex Morales | UCF |

=== Most Valuable Player ===
Tony Marrillia was named Tournament Most Valuable Player. Marrillia was an outfielder for UCF.
