= 1994 Trans America Athletic Conference baseball tournament =

American college baseball tournament

- Teams: 4
- Format: Double-elimination
- Finals site: Claude Smith Field; Macon, Georgia
- Champions: Southeastern Louisiana (2nd title)
- Winning coach: Greg Marten (2nd title)
- MVP: Dan Newman (Southeastern Louisiana)

1994 Trans America Athletic Conference baseball standings
	Conf.				Overall
Team	W		L	PCT	W		L	PCT
East
FIU ^{x}‍‍‍	12	–	6	.667	38	–	21	.644
Stetson ‍‍‍	9	–	9	.500	37	–	21	.638
UCF ‍‍‍	8	–	10	.444	29	–	26	.527
College of Charleston ‍‍‍	7	–	11	.389	27	–	21	.563
Florida Atlantic ‍‍‍	0	–	0	–	31	–	23	.574
West
Mercer ^{x}‍†‍‍	15	–	9	.625	32	–	21	.604
Southeastern Louisiana ^{x}‍†‍‡‍^{y}	15	–	9	.625	34	–	30	.531
Samford ‍‍‍	13	–	11	.542	19	–	33	.365
Centenary ‍‍‍	11	–	13	.458	23	–	28	.451
Georgia State ‍‍‍	6	–	18	.250	12	–	42	.222
x – Division champion † – Conference champion ‡ – Tournament champion y – Invited to the NCAA tournament As of June 30, 1994; Rankings from Collegiate Baseball

The 1994 Trans America Athletic Conference baseball tournament was held at Claude Smith Field on the campus of Mercer University in Macon, Georgia. This was the sixteenth tournament championship held by the Trans America Athletic Conference, in its sixteenth year of existence. Southeastern Louisiana won their second tournament championship and earned the conference's automatic bid to the 1994 NCAA Division I baseball tournament.

== Format and seeding ==
The top two finishers from each division by conference winning percentage qualified for the tournament, with the top seed from one division playing the second seed from the opposite in the first round. Florida Atlantic was not eligible and did not play games that counted in the conference standings as it was their first year in the league.

Team	W	L	Pct.	GB	Seed
East
FIU	12	6	.667	—	1E
Stetson	9	9	.500	3	2E
UCF	8	10	.444	4	—
College of Charleston	7	11	.389	5	—
Florida Atlantic	0	0	—	—	—

Team	W	L	Pct.	GB	Seed
West
Mercer	15	9	.625	—	1W
Southeastern Louisiana	15	9	.625	—	2W
Samford	13	11	.542	2	—
Centenary	11	13	.333	4	—
Georgia State	6	18	.250	9	—

== Bracket ==
First round
1E	FIU	5
2W	Southeastern Louisiana	6
1W	Mercer	8
2E	Stetson	1
Lower round 1
1E	FIU	11
2E	Stetson	10

Semi-finals
2W	Southeastern Louisiana	4
1W	Mercer	6
Lower final
2W	Southeastern Louisiana	10
1E	FIU	7

Finals
1W	Mercer
2W	Southeastern Louisiana

== All-Tournament Team ==
The following players were named to the All-Tournament Team.

POS	Player	School
P	Rick Miller	Mercer
P	Matt Barefield	Mercer
C	Jason Moore	FIU
1B	Kevin Millican	Southeastern Louisiana
2B	Dan Newman	Southeastern Louisiana
3B	Mitch Markham	Stetson
SS	Kenny Langlois	Southeastern Louisiana
OF	Chad Magistro	Mercer
OF	Bob Kallemeyn	FIU
OF	Shane Brister	Southeastern Louisiana
DH	Jason Smith	Mercer

=== Most Valuable Player ===
Dan Newman was named Tournament Most Valuable Player. Newman was a second baseman for Southeastern Louisiana.
