= Travis Hawkins =

American football player and coach

Profile
- Position: Defensive back

Personal information
- Born: February 18, 1991 (age 35); Rockville, Maryland, U.S.
- Listed height: 5 ft 9 in (1.75 m)
- Listed weight: 191 lb (87 kg)

Career information
- College: Delaware

Career history
- 2014: New England Patriots*
- 2015: Toronto Argonauts
- 2016: Winnipeg Blue Bombers
- 2017: Baltimore Brigade*
- 2017: Montreal Alouettes
- * Offseason or practice squad member only
- Stats at CFL.ca

Travis Lamont Hawkins (born February 18, 1991) is a retired gridiron football defensive back and current youth football coach.

Hawkins played college football for the University of Delaware after transferring from the University of Maryland. Hawkins was originally signed by the New England Patriots of the National Football League as an undrafted free agent in 2014, before being released in the preseason. He then played in 14 games for the Toronto Argonauts of the Canadian Football League (CFL) in 2015, making 38 tackles and two interceptions.

In 2017, Hawkins was among the first five players signed to the Baltimore Brigade of the Arena Football League. He was placed on the league suspension list on March 17, before being signed by the Montreal Alouettes of the CFL on May 24. He was placed on the other league exempt list for the Brigade on June 8. He was released by the Alouettes on November 30, 2017.

After retiring from playing, Hawkins began working as a football coach at Northwest High School in Germantown, Maryland, being named the head varsity coach in 2021.

During a football game in 2022, a bench-clearing brawl occurred on the field between the players, fans, and coaches of Northwest and Gaithersburg High Schools. Hawkins was fired by the school district due to his failure to deescalate and his involvement. He was charged for assaulting Gaithersburg's coach during the fight. The charge was later dropped, with Hawkins defended his actions by stating he was defending himself and students. The next year, he was hired to work as a defensive coordinator at Dr. Henry A. Wise Jr. High School in Prince George's County, Maryland. He has since stepped down to focus on his mental health which had deteriorated due to his involvement in the fight.
