= 1994 Ivy League Baseball Championship Series =

1994 Ivy League baseball tournament
- Teams: 2
- Format: Best of three series
- Finals site: Palmer Field; Middletown, Connecticut
- Champions: Yale (2nd title)
- Winning coach: John Stuper (2nd title)

1994 Ivy League baseball standings
	Conf.						Overall
Team	W		L		T	PCT	W		L		T	PCT
Lou Gehrig
Penn ^{x}‍‍‍	14	–	6	–	0	.700	25	–	12	–	1	.671
Columbia ‍‍‍	12	–	8	–	0	.600	18	–	24	–	0	.429
Princeton ‍‍‍	10	–	10	–	0	.500	21	–	19	–	0	.525
Cornell ‍‍‍	7	–	13	–	0	.350	12	–	25	–	0	.324
Red Rolfe
Yale ^{x}‍‍‡‍^{y}	14	–	6	–	0	.700	24	–	19	–	0	.558
Dartmouth ‍‍‍	9	–	11	–	0	.450	16	–	21	–	0	.432
Harvard ‍‍‍	7	–	13	–	0	.350	13	–	22	–	1	.375
Brown ‍‍‍	7	–	13	–	0	.350	10	–	28	–	0	.263
x – Division champion ‡ – Championship Series champion y – Invited to the NCAA tournament As of June 30, 1994; Rankings from Collegiate Baseball

The 1994 Ivy League Baseball Championship Series took place at Palmer Field in Middletown, Connecticut, on May 7 and 8, 1994. The series matched the regular season champions of each of the league's two divisions. Yale, the winner of the series, claimed their second title in the two years of the event and the Ivy League's automatic berth in the 1994 NCAA Division I baseball tournament.

It was Penn's first appearance in the Championship Series.

== Results ==
Finals
Penn	1	8	1
Yale	7	4	5
