= 1993 Big South Conference baseball tournament =

- Teams: 6
- Format: Double-elimination
- Finals site: Charles Watson Stadium; Conway, South Carolina
- Champions: Liberty (1st title)
- Winning coach: Johnny Hunton (1st title)
- MVP: Rich Humphrey (Liberty)

1993 Big South Conference baseball standings
	Conf.				Overall
Team	W		L	PCT	W		L	PCT
Coastal Carolina ‍†‍‍	15	–	8	.652	28	–	28	.500
UMBC ‍‍‍	14	–	8	.636	26	–	17	.605
Towson State ‍‍‍	14	–	9	.609	20	–	25	.444
Winthrop ‍‍‍	12	–	10	.545	27	–	31	.466
Radford ‍‍‍	10	–	10	.500	29	–	19	.604
Liberty ‍‍‡‍^{y}	10	–	11	.476	23	–	25	.479
Campbell ‍‍‍	8	–	11	.421	17	–	33	.340
Charleston Southern ‍‍‍	7	–	15	.318	19	–	22	.463
UNC Asheville ‍‍‍	6	–	14	.300	19	–	27	.413
UNC Greensboro ‍‍‍	0	–	0	–	23	–	22	.511
† – Conference champion ‡ – Tournament champion y – Invited to the NCAA tournament As of June 30, 1993; Rankings from Collegiate Baseball

The 1993 Big South Conference baseball tournament was the postseason baseball tournament for the Big South Conference, held from May 13 through 16 at Charles Watson Stadium home field of Coastal Carolina in Conway, South Carolina. The top six finishers from the regular season participated in the double-elimination tournament. The champion, Liberty, won the title for the first time and earned an invitation to the 1993 NCAA Division I baseball tournament.

== Format ==
The top six finishers from the regular season qualified for the tournament. The teams were seeded one through six and played a double-elimination tournament. UNC Greensboro was ineligible for conference competition.

Team	W	L	Pct.	GB	Seed
Coastal Carolina	15	8	.652	—	1
UMBC	14	8	.636	.5	2
Towson State	14	9	.609	1	3
Winthrop	12	10	.545	2.5	4
Radford	10	10	.500	3.5	5
Liberty	10	11	.476	4	6
Campbell	8	11	.421	5	—
Charleston Southern	7	15	.318	7.5	—
UNC Asheville	6	14	.300	8.5	—
UNC Greensboro	—	—	—	—	—

== Bracket and results ==
First round
1	Coastal Carolina	7
6	Liberty	12
3	Towson State	1
4	Winthrop	7
2	UMBC	3
5	Radford	9

Second round
6	Liberty	4
3	Towson State	2
4	Winthrop	3
5	Radford	10
1	Coastal Carolina	2
2	UMBC	8

Third round
6	Liberty	3
5	Radford	11
4	Winthrop	2
2	UMBC	13

Semifinals
6	Liberty	13
2	UMBC	12

Final
5	Radford	5	1
6	Liberty	13	6

== All-Tournament Team ==
Name	School
Sheldon Bream	Liberty
John Burns	UMBC
Greg Elliott	UMBC
John Gegg	Radford
Scott Harmsen	Liberty
Rich Humphrey	Liberty
Charlie Kim	Liberty
Beau Martin	Liberty
Rob McCandless	Radford
Denny Van Pelt	Radford
Mike Vota	Towson State

=== Most Valuable Player ===
Rich Humphrey was named Tournament Most Valuable Player. Humphrey was a pitcher for Liberty.
