= Palmer Field =

Sports stadium in Middletown, Connecticut

- Interactive map of Palmer Field
- Location: 49 Bernie Orourke Drive, Middletown, Connecticut, USA
- Coordinates: 41.556458°N 72.67051°W
- Owner: City of Middletown
- Capacity: 3,500
- Surface: Grass

Tenants
- Ivy League Baseball Championship Series (1993-1994); American Legion World Series (1988, 1999); Middletown Giants (NECBL) (1994-2003); Middletown Spartans (NEFL) (2007-2014); Xavier High School (CIAC) Varsity Football and Baseball

Palmer Field is a multi-use baseball, soccer, and football stadium located in Middletown, Connecticut.

In 1993 and 1994, the first two editions of the Ivy League Baseball Championship Series were held at the field, with Yale claiming both titles.
