= C.O. Brown Stadium =

American baseball stadium in Michigan

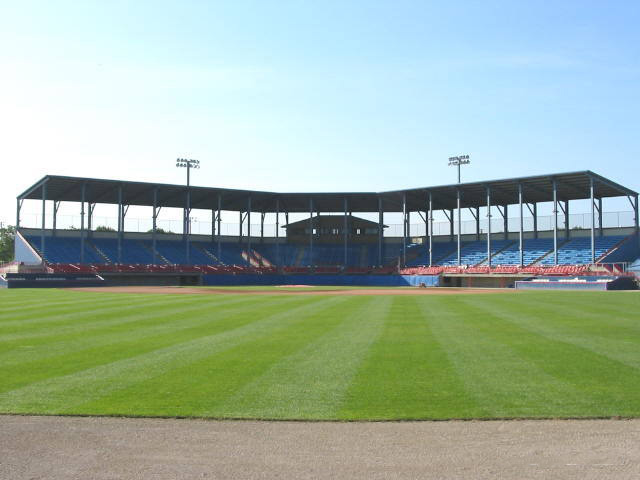
Outfield view of C. O. Brown Stadium.

C.O. Brown Stadium is a baseball stadium in the United States located in Battle Creek, Michigan. The current stadium structure was built in 1990 and is a part of Bailey Park, a longtime home of amateur baseball and softball. Prior to the 1990 reconstruction, Bailey Park had been home to amateur, high school and college play since the 1930s, in a single-level grandstand built primarily of wood. C.O. Brown Stadium is the former home of the Michigan Battle Cats, Battle Creek Yankees and the Southwest Michigan Devil Rays of the Class A Midwest League. The stadium has a seating capacity of 2,193. C.O. Brown Stadium is the current home of the Northwoods League's Battle Creek Battle Jacks and the Kellogg Community College Bruins baseball team.

== Name origin ==
The stadium was named for Cooper Othniel Brown, a baseball entrepreneur who helped make Battle Creek a hub for amateur tournament baseball in the 1930s and served as the first president of the American Amateur Baseball Congress.

== Other events ==
On August 31, 2008, shortly after accepting the Democratic Party nomination, Barack Obama and Joe Biden held a rally at C.O. Brown Stadium drawing an estimated 15,000 people.

It has also hosted postseason baseball tournaments. Until 2013, the MHSAA used the stadium to host the Michigan Baseball State Championships for all four divisions where they have been moved to Drayton McLane Baseball Stadium at John H. Kobs Field in 2014. From 1990-1994, the NCAA Division III baseball tournament was held at the venue. The stadium also hosted the 1993 and 1994 Big Ten Conference baseball tournaments.

== Stadium renovations ==
In 2016 the team announced major ballpark renovations that will drop the seating capacity of C.O. Brown Stadium from more than 4,000 to 2,300. The marquee renovation includes the introduction of an all-new “Home Plate Club,” which will feature 10 granite half-moon tables situated directly behind home plate. Each table will also feature four stadium chairs sourced from Camden Yards. Each table will have access to its own all-inclusive upscale menu, including both beer and wine pairings. The team has already had a number of these reserved and is taking deposits for full- and half-season plans immediately. All 10 tables are expected to be sold out well before Opening Day.

“The Champions Club,” which was sold out for most of 2015, now shifts down the first and third base lines. These areas will now feature additional legroom and a food and beverage railing in front of each seat. This renovation allows for a more comfortable fan experience and gives the Bombers 98 Champions Club seats for 2016.

The bleacher area will also look quite different this summer. The team will offer reserved bleacher seats instead of general admission seating, which will guarantee ticket holders a designated seat at each game. The first-base side will now have permanent vinyl grandstand covers over the seats. These covers will eliminate seating in an area where historically the sun has tormented fans.

The Miller Lite Party Deck will also be receiving a facelift, courtesy of Heights Construction. While some general upkeep and maintenance will be performed, the team plans to stain the deck area while repurposing seats from the original C.O. Brown Stadium bowl grandstand. Furthermore, the team has now limited the Miller Lite Party Deck to approximately 375 tickets on any given night and will allow groups to reserve their own private sections.

== Awards ==
In November 2007, Bailey Park and C.O. Brown Stadium was awarded the 2007 USSSA United States Specialty Sports Association Complex of the Year Award presented at the USSSA National Meeting in Daytona Beach, Florida.

Presented annually to one facility in the country, there are a number of requirements that a complex must meet to qualify. Requirements for the award include: full participation with USSSA, a proven history of hosting and running quality events, a high number of participating teams, outstanding facilities, and top notch ground crews.
