= List of people from Joliet, Illinois =

The following list includes notable people who were born or have lived in Joliet, Illinois. For a similar list organized alphabetically by last name, see the category page People from Joliet, Illinois.

== Acting ==
- Tim Baltz (born 1981), actor and comedian (The Righteous Gemstones)
- John Barrowman (born 1967), actor (Doctor Who, Torchwood)
- Nora Bayes (1880–1928), actress, singer, and comedian
- John Beck (born 1943), actor (The Other Side of Midnight, Rollerball)
- Jodi Carlisle (born 1960), actress (The Wild Thornberrys)
- Tyler Christopher (1972- 2023), actor (General Hospital)
- JoAnn Dean Killingsworth (1923–2015), actress and dancer, first person to play Snow White at Disneyland
- Andy Dick (born 1965), comedian, actor, musician and producer (NewsRadio)
- Janina Gavankar (born 1980), actress, musician (True Blood)
- Kathryn Hays (1933–2022), actress (As the World Turns)
- Mercedes McCambridge (1916–2004), actress; 1949 Academy Award for Best Supporting Actress (All the King's Men, Giant)
- Nick Offerman (born 1970), actor, comedian, and carpenter (Parks and Recreation)
- Larry Parks (1914–1975), stage and film actor (The Jolson Story)
- Anthony Rapp (born 1971), stage and film actor and singer (Rent)
- Lynne Thigpen (1948–2003), Tony Award-winning stage, film and TV actress (Carmen Sandiego, The Paper, Godspell)
- Audrey Totter (1917–2013), actress (Lady in the Lake, Our Man Higgins)
- Vince Vieluf (born 1970), actor (Rat Race)

== Academics, arts, and writing ==
- William Lincoln Bakewell (1888–1969), able seaman on Shackleton Antarctic expedition
- Ann Bannon (born 1932), pulp fiction writer
- Charles Bowden (1945–2014), educator and writer
- Robert Todd Carroll (1945–2016), publisher of The Skeptic's Dictionary and fellow of Committee for Skeptical Inquiry
- James Downey (born 1952), head writer for Saturday Night Live
- Wendy Anderson Halperin, children's book illustrator and writer
- John Houbolt (1919–2014), aerospace engineer
- Mort Kondracke (born 1939), political commentator and journalist
- Phyllis Reynolds Naylor (born 1933), children's and young adult fiction author
- Robert Novak (1931–2009), syndicated columnist, author, conservative political commentator
- Adam Rapp (born 1968), novelist, playwright, screenwriter, filmmaker and musician
- Johan Reinhard (born 1943), anthropologist, archaeologist
- James J. Stukel (born 1937), 15th President of the University of Illinois (born in Joliet)
- Edwin Way Teale (1899–1980), naturalist, photographer, Pulitzer Prize-winning author
- Lester Frank Ward (1841–1913) botanist, paleontologist, and sociologist; born in Joliet
- Adele Fay Williams (1859–1937), artist and newspaper writer, born in Joliet
- Eric Raddatz, American journalist and filmmaker

== Business ==
- John D. Goeken (1930–2010), founder of MCI Inc. and Airfone
- John Fremont McCullough (1871–1963), co-founder of Dairy Queen; opened first store in Joliet in 1940
- William Cornelius Van Horne (1843–1915), pioneering Canadian railway executive
- Mike Wolfe (born 1964), owner of Antique Archaeology; cast member of American Pickers

== Crime ==
- Milton Johnson (born 1950), serial killer

== Military ==
- Joseph F. Ambrose (1896–1988), World War I veteran
- Earl N. Franklin (1917–2003), colonel of the United States Air Force and Tuskegee Airman
- Frank Perconte (1917–2003), D-Day veteran, member of Easy Company, 506th parachute infantry regiment, portrayed in the HBO miniseries Band of Brothers by James Madio

== Modeling ==
- Adrianne Curry (born 1982), model, best known as the first winner of America's Next Top Model
- Lois Delander (1911–1985), Miss America 1927

== Music ==
- Charlie Adams (born 1954), drummer for Chameleon and Yanni, spokesman for Autism Society of America
- John Barrowman (born 1967), Scottish singer, actor, dancer, musical performer and media personality; 1985 graduate of Joliet West High School
- Buffalocomotive, rock band formed in 2004 that recorded the theme song for Inked
- Mark Carman (born 1960), Grammy-nominated producer, songwriter, musician, singer
- Jimmy Chamberlin (born 1964), drummer, songwriter and producer of The Smashing Pumpkins
- Edward Joseph Collins (1886–1951), pianist and composer
- Da Brat (born 1974), born Shawntae Harris, Grammy-nominated rapper and actress; first female solo rap act to have platinum-selling album
- Five Pointe O, alternative rock music group, active 1999–2003
- Janina Gavankar (born 1980), actress and musician
- Frank Marocco (1931–2012), accordionist
- Don Murray (1904–1929), jazz clarinet and saxophone player
- Kerry Muzzey (born 1970), film and television composer
- Ron Nelson (1929–2023), composer of classical and semi-classical music, retired music educator
- Ann Nesby (born 1950), R&B, gospel, and dance music singer/songwriter and actress, former lead singer of Sounds of Blackness
- Doug Pinnick (born 1950), bass guitarist, songwriter, and co-lead vocalist for King's X
- Lionel Richie (born 1949), Grammy Award-winning singer-songwriter and record producer, composer of the Academy Award-winning song "Say You, Say Me"
- Steve Rodby (born 1954), bass guitarist for Pat Metheny Group
- Elisabeth Withers, neo-soul and R&B singer-songwriter

== Politics and law ==
- Edward C. Akin (1852–1936), Illinois attorney general and mayor of Joliet
- Meade Baltz (1912–1994), businessman and Illinois state legislator
- Richard J. Barr (1865–1951), Illinois state senator and mayor of Joliet
- William G. Barr (1920–1987), Illinois state representative and businessman
- Joel Aldrich Matteson (1808–1873), 10th governor of Illinois
- Lucy McBath (born 1960), U.S. representative for Georgia
- George H. Munroe (1844–1912), Illinois state senator and businessman
- Lewis E. Reed (born 1962), first African-American president of the Board of Aldermen in St. Louis, Missouri (2007–2022)
- Richard Terrin (1890–1958), lawyer, military theorist and Asia expert
- Lawrence M. Walsh Sr. (born 1948), Illinois state senator and farmer

== Religion ==
- Lawrence Jenco (1934–1996), Roman Catholic priest and author; taken hostage in Beirut in January 1985 and held for 564 days
- Roger Kaffer (1927–2009), auxiliary bishop of the Roman Catholic Diocese of Joliet (1985–2002)

== Sports ==
=== Baseball ===
- Sweetbreads Bailey (1895–1939), pitcher for the Chicago Cubs and Brooklyn Robins
- Rylan Bannon (born 1996), third baseman in the New York Mets organization
- Jesse Barfield (born 1959), outfielder for the Toronto Blue Jays, New York Yankees, and Yomiuri Giants (Japan)
- Sean Bergman (born 1970), pitcher for five MLB teams and one team in the NPB league of Japan
- Bobby Burke (1907–1971), pitcher for the Washington Senators and Philadelphia Phillies
- Kevin Cameron (born 1979), pitcher for the San Diego Padres and Oakland Athletics
- Harry Caray, baseball broadcaster and Ford C. Frick Award winner who broadcast in Joliet early in his career
- Mark Carlson (born 1969), umpire in Major League Baseball
- Kelly Dransfeldt (born 1975), shortstop for the Texas Rangers and Chicago White Sox
- Brian DuBois (1967–2023), pitcher for the Detroit Tigers
- Gordie Gillespie (1926–2015), coach, member of College Baseball Hall of Fame
- Mike Grace (born 1970), pitcher for the Philadelphia Phillies
- Mark Andrew Grant (born 1963), pitcher for six MLB teams
- Bill Gullickson (born 1959), pitcher for six MLB teams; played baseball at Joliet Catholic Academy
- Larry Gura (born 1947), pitcher for the Chicago Cubs, New York Yankees and Kansas City Royals
- Bill Haller (1935–2022), American League umpire and official 1961–1985
- Jack Hendricks (1875–1943), outfielder and manager for several MLB teams
- Ed Lagger (1912–1981), pitcher for the Philadelphia Athletics
- Mark Leiter (born 1963), pitcher for eight MLB teams
- Bernice Metesch (born 1929), All-American Girls Professional Baseball League player
- Chris Michalak (born 1971), pitcher for the Arizona Diamondbacks, Toronto Blue Jays, Texas Rangers and Cincinnati Reds
- Bill Moran (1869–1916), catcher and left fielder for the St. Louis Browns and Chicago Colts
- Margaret Murray, All-American Girls Professional Baseball League player
- Steve Parris (born 1967), pitcher for the Pittsburgh Pirates, Cincinnati Reds, Toronto Blue Jays and Tampa Bay Devil Rays
- Jack Perconte (born 1954), infielder for the Los Angeles Dodgers, Cleveland Indians, Seattle Mariners, and Chicago White Sox; sports writer
- Jeff Reed (born 1962), catcher with six MLB teams
- Ed Spiezio (born 1941), third baseman for the St. Louis Cardinals, San Diego Padres, and Chicago White Sox
- Scott Spiezio (born 1972), infielder for the Oakland Athletics, Anaheim Angels, Seattle Mariners and St. Louis Cardinals
- Bill Sudakis (1946–2021), third baseman for six MLB teams

=== Basketball ===
- Cathy Boswell (born 1962), 1984 gold medal Olympian USA women's basketball
- Bulbs Ehlers (1923–2013), played basketball for Purdue and NBA's Boston Celtics
- Jeremiah Fears (born 2006), guard for Oklahoma Sooners men's basketball, drafted 7th overall in the 2025 NBA draft by the New Orleans Pelicans; brother of Jeremy Fears Jr.
- Jeremy Fears Jr. (born 2005), point guard for Michigan State
- Terry Gannon (born 1963), player for North Carolina State 1983 NCAA champions, sportscaster for NBC Sports and the Golf Channel
- Bill Jones (born 1958), center for Northern Iowa Panthers and in Australia's National Basketball League; captained Adelaide 36ers to 1986 NBL Championship
- Ed Mikan (1925–1999), center for the Chicago Stags, Rochester Royals, Philadelphia Warriors, Indianapolis Olympians, and Boston Celtics
- George Mikan (1924–2005), Hall of Fame center and coach for DePaul and five-time NBA champion Minneapolis Lakers
- Roger Powell (born 1983), small forward for Illinois 2005 NCAA finalists and NBA's Utah Jazz
- Allie Quigley (born 1986), All-Star guard for WNBA's Chicago Sky
- Alando Tucker (born 1984), small forward and shooting guard for Wisconsin, 2007 Big Ten Player of the Year; NBA's Phoenix Suns

=== Football ===
- Mike Alstott (born 1973), fullback, 6-time Pro Bowl selection for the Super Bowl XXXVII champion Tampa Bay Buccaneers
- Pete Bercich (born 1971), player and assistant coach for the Minnesota Vikings
- Gordie Gillespie (1926–2015), college football coach
- Mike Goolsby (born 1982), linebacker for the St. Louis Rams
- Harlan Gustafson (1917–1984), 1939 All-America end for University of Pennsylvania
- George Hartong (1896–1973), center for the Chicago Cardinals
- Elmer Madarik (1922–1974), running back for the Detroit Lions and Washington Redskins
- Eric Parker (born 1979), wide receiver for the San Diego Chargers
- Pug Rentner (1910–1978), halfback and quarterback for the Boston Redskins and Chicago Bears
- Daniel Ruettiger (born 1948), college football player, motivational speaker; inspiration for film Rudy
- Eric Steinbach (born 1980), guard for the Cincinnati Bengals and Cleveland Browns
- Tom Thayer (born 1961), center and guard for the Chicago Bears and Miami Dolphins
- Jim Valek (1928–2005), player and head coach for University of Illinois

=== Ice hockey ===
- Taylor House (born 1998), ice hockey player in the PWHL

=== Martial arts ===
- Randall Kleck, martial artist; World Karate Union Hall of Fame

=== Motorsports ===
- Danny Kladis, Indianapolis 500 driver and inductee of the National Midget Auto Racing Hall of Fame

=== Wrestling ===
- Juice Robinson, professional wrestler in New Japan Pro-Wrestling and All Elite Wrestling, 3rd IWGP United States Heavyweight Champion

=== Boxing ===
- Joseph Awinongya, American Boxing trainer of Ghanaian descent, he's resided at Joliet, Illinois. Born in Ghana,but moved to United States in 1999
