= 1993 NAIA World Series =

1993 NAIA baseball tournament
- 1993 NAIA World Series
- Teams: 8
- Format: Double elimination Page playoff
- Finals site: Sec Taylor Stadium; Des Moines, Iowa
- Champions: Saint Francis (IL) (1st title)
- Winning coach: Gordie Gillespie
- MVP: Ivan Lawler (P/OF) (Saint Francis (IL))

The 1993 NAIA World Series was the 37th annual tournament hosted by the National Association of Intercollegiate Athletics to determine the national champion of baseball among its member colleges and universities in the United States and Canada.

The tournament was again played at Sec Taylor Stadium in Des Moines, Iowa.

Saint Francis (IL) (46-16-2) defeated Southeastern Oklahoma State (43–19) in a single-game championship series, 4–2, to win the Fighting Saints' first NAIA World Series. It was the fourth title for Saint Francis coach Gordie Gillespie, who won three NAIA World Series with Lewis in 1974, 1975, and 1976.

Saint Francis pitcher and outfielder Ivan Lawler was named tournament MVP.

== Bracket ==
=== Preliminary ===
First round Losers to Championship Bracket, Second Round
Point Loma Nazarene	3
Saint Francis (IL)	11
Geneva	2
St. Mary's (TX)	1
Carson-Newman	3
Cumberland (TN)	2
Marian (WI)	5
SE Oklahoma State	6

Second round Losers to Championship Bracket, Third Round
Saint Francis	6
Geneva	4
Carson–Newman	2
SE Oklahoma State	5

Third round Both teams to Championship Bracket, Semifinals
Saint Francis	7
SE Oklahoma State	0

=== Championship ===
Second round
Cumberland	10
Marian	4
Point Loma Nazarene	5
St. Mary's	1

Third round
Geneva	1
Cumberland	6
Carson–Newman	4
Point Loma Nazarene	14

Semifinals
Saint Francis	1
Cumberland	0
SE Oklahoma State	4
Point Loma Nazarene	1

Championship
Saint Francis	4	–
SE Oklahoma State	2	–

== See also ==
- 1993 NCAA Division I baseball tournament
- 1993 NCAA Division II baseball tournament
- 1993 NCAA Division III baseball tournament
- 1993 NAIA Softball World Series
