= Joseph F. Ambrose =

American army soldier (1896–1988)

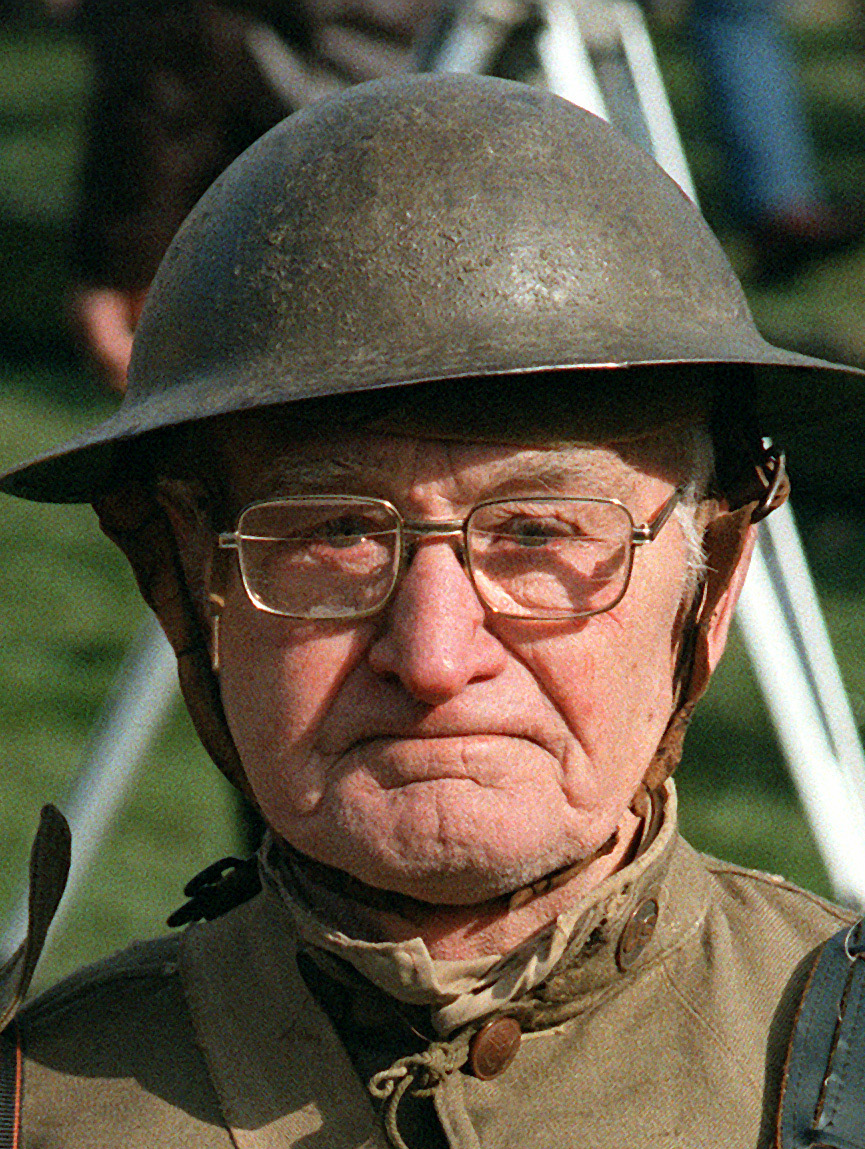
- Ambrose in uniform during a homage to Vietnam War veterans, 1982
- Born: Joseph Francis Ambrose; May 24, 1896; Joliet, Illinois, U.S.
- Died: May 1, 1988 (aged 91); Joliet, Illinois, U.S.
- Resting place: Woodlawn Memorial Park, Joliet, Illinois, U.S. 41°31′30″N 88°10′42″W
- Other name: "Doughboy Joe"
- Spouse: Marie P. Ambrose
- Children: 4
- Military service
- Branch: United States Army
- Units: Company I, 140th Infantry, 35th Division
- Battles: World War I; St. Mihiel; Meuse-Argonne; Defensive Sector
- Awards: World War I Victory Medal

Joseph Francis Ambrose (May 24, 1896 – May 1, 1988) was an American World War I veteran. He served with Company I, 140th Infantry, 35th Division, of the American Expeditionary Forces, from 1917 to 1919, becoming nationally known for his photo at the dedication day parade for the Vietnam Veterans Memorial in Washington, D.C., at the age of 86. In this widely viewed and circulated United States Defense Audiovisual Agency photo, he was photographed wearing his Doughboy uniform, helmet and field equipment, for which he was known as "Doughboy Joe". In the photo, Ambrose carries the U.S. flag that had covered the casket of his son, Clement A. Ambrose, who was killed in the Korean War in 1951.

== Early life ==
Ambrose was born May 24, 1896, in Joliet, Illinois. His father and mother were Roman Catholic Austrians, and lived in a community of many German and Austrian immigrants.

== World War I ==
Ambrose was drafted in 1917 and served in the United States Army until 1919. Before World War I he was a laborer at the Phoenix Horse Shoe Company.

== Later life ==
After the war, Ambrose lived with his father and sister and worked as a heater at a gas company. Sometime in the mid-1920s, he married Marie, a Croatian speaker who was born in 1904 and had immigrated to the U.S. from Austria-Hungary in 1907. They had four sons, Joseph Jr. (1924), Norbert (1927), Clement (1929) and Rolland (1934). In 1930, Ambrose worked in the tile business and in 1942 he gave E. I. Du Pont Construction as his employer on his World War II draft registration card.

Ambrose's third son, Clement A. Ambrose (1929–1951), was a sergeant in the 7th Infantry Regiment, 3rd Infantry Division when he was killed in action in the Korean War at the age of 22 on February 14, 1951.

Marie Ambrose died in 1980 at 76, and Joseph on May 1, 1988, at age 91. The Joliet Public Library carries his obituary in the 1988 Obituary Index, listing him as "Ambrose, Joseph F. Sr. 'Doughboy Joe'."

== Legacy ==
Ambrose was posthumously honored in a speech given by U.S. Senator from Illinois Dick Durbin, for Veterans Day, in 2012. Durbin said:

Joseph Ambrose wore his old Army 'doughboy' uniform and carried his son's flag often to Veterans Day parades and VFW conventions. He confessed that some years he had to go on a crash diet to squeeze back into it. But he did it to honor the veterans of the Korean and the Vietnam wars, wars he believed America was trying then to forget. He wanted to remind us of an important truth: that no matter the outcome of a war, those who answer the call of duty and risk everything to defend America deserve the respect of a grateful nation.

== See also ==
- List of people from Joliet, Illinois
