= Terren =

Terren is a given name. Notable people with the name include:

- Terren Jones (born 1991), American football player
- Terren Peizer (born 1959), American businessperson convicted of insider trading and securities fraud

== See also ==
- Terrin
