= 1993 NCAA Division III baseball tournament =

- Season: 1993
- Teams: 32
- Finals site: C. O. Brown Stadium; Battle Creek, Michigan
- Champions: Montclair State (2nd title)
- Runner-up: Wisconsin-Oshkosh
- MOP: Drew Yocum (Montclair State)

The 1993 NCAA Division III baseball tournament was played at the end of the 1993 NCAA Division III baseball season to determine the 18th national champion of college baseball at the NCAA Division III level. The tournament concluded with eight teams competing at C. O. Brown Stadium in Battle Creek, Michigan, for the championship. Eight regional tournaments were held to determine the participants in the World Series. Regional tournaments were contested in double-elimination format, with one region consisting of six teams, six regions consisting of four teams, and one region consisting of two teams, which was played as best-of-five, for a total of 32 teams participating in the tournament. The tournament champion was Montclair State, who defeated Wisconsin-Oshkosh for the championship.

== See also ==
- 1993 NCAA Division I baseball tournament
- 1993 NCAA Division II baseball tournament
- 1993 NCAA Division I softball tournament
- 1993 NAIA World Series
