= Veterans Day =

Federal holiday in the United States

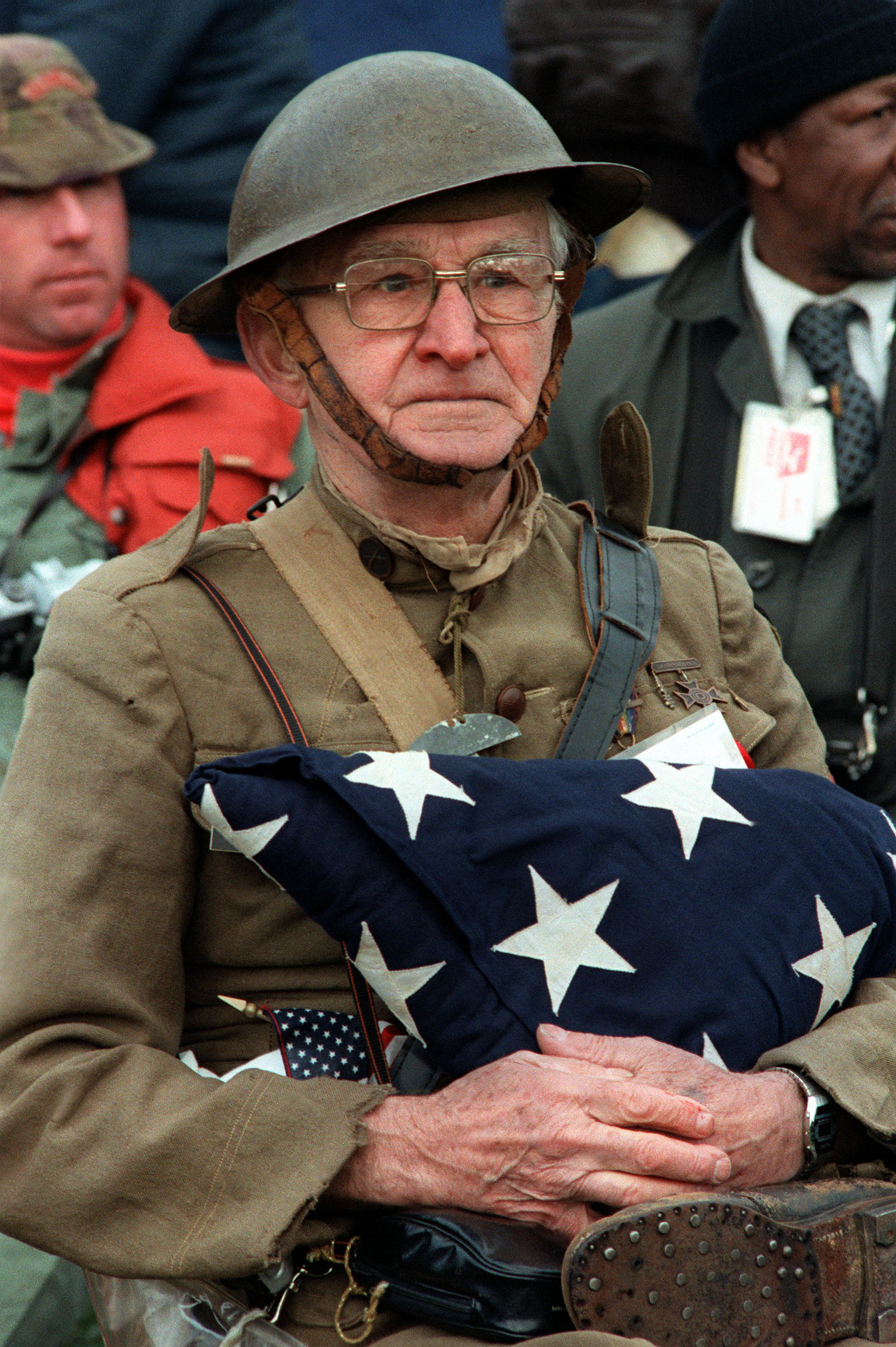
- U.S. World War I veteran Joseph Ambrose (1896–1988) attends the dedication parade for the Vietnam Veterans Memorial in 1982, wearing his original Brodie helmet and doughboy uniform and holding the flag that covered the casket of his son, Clement, who was killed in the Korean War.
- Observed by: United States
- Type: National
- Celebrations: Veterans Day parades
- Date: November 11 (Note: "Federal law (5 U.S.C. 6103) establishes the public holidays ... for Federal employees. Please note that most Federal employees work on a Monday through Friday schedule. For these employees, when a holiday falls on a nonworkday—Saturday or Sunday—the holiday usually is observed on Monday (if the holiday falls on Sunday) or Friday (if the holiday falls on Saturday)." "Federal Holidays". US Office of Personnel Management.)
- Frequency: Annual
- First time: 1954; 72 years ago
- Related to: Armistice Day; Remembrance Day

Veterans Day (originally known as Armistice Day) is a federal holiday in the United States observed annually on November 11, for honoring military veterans of the United States Armed Forces. (Note: Those who were discharged under conditions other than dishonorable.) It coincides with holidays in several countries, including Armistice Day and Remembrance Day, which also occur on the anniversary of the end of World War I. Major hostilities of World War I were formally ended at the 11th hour of the 11th day of the 11th month of 1918 when the Armistice with Germany went into effect. At the urging of major U.S. veteran organizations, Armistice Day was renamed Veterans Day in 1954.

Veterans Day is distinct from Memorial Day, a U.S. public holiday in May: Veterans Day commemorates the service of all U.S. veterans, while the older Memorial Day, which grew out of Civil War commemorations, specifically honors those who have died while in military service. Another military holiday that also occurs in May, Armed Forces Day, honors those currently serving in the U.S. military. Additionally, Women Veterans Day is recognized by a growing number of U.S. states that specifically honor women who have served in the U.S. military. As Veterans Day and the birthday of the United States Marine Corps (November 10, 1775) are only one day apart, that branch of the Armed Forces customarily observes both occasions as a 96-hour liberty period.

== History ==
On November 11, 1919, President Woodrow Wilson issued a message to his countrymen on the first Armistice Day, in which he expressed what he felt the day meant to Americans:

A year ago today our enemies laid down their arms in accordance with an armistice which rendered them impotent to renew hostilities, and gave to the world an assured opportunity to reconstruct its shattered order and to work out in peace a new and more just set of international relations. The soldiers and people of the European Allies had fought and endured for more than four years to uphold the barrier of civilization against the aggressions of armed force. We ourselves had been in the conflict something more than a year and a half.

With splendid forgetfulness of mere personal concerns, we remodeled our industries, concentrated our financial resources, increased our agricultural output, and assembled a great army, so that at the last our power was a decisive factor in the victory. We were able to bring the vast resources, material and moral, of a great and free people to the assistance of our associates in Europe who had suffered and sacrificed without limit in the cause for which we fought.

Out of this victory there arose new possibilities of political freedom and economic concert. The war showed us the strength of great nations acting together for high purposes, and the victory of arms foretells the enduring conquests which can be made in peace when nations act justly and in furtherance of the common interests of men.

To us in America the reflections of Armistice Day will be filled with solemn pride in the heroism of those who died in the country's service, and with gratitude for the victory, both because of the thing from which it has freed us and because of the opportunity it has given America to show her sympathy with peace and justice in the councils of nations.

The United States Congress adopted a resolution on June 4, 1926, requesting that President Calvin Coolidge issue annual proclamations calling for the observance of November 11 with appropriate ceremonies. A Congressional Act (52 Stat. 351; 5 U.S. Code, Sec. 87a) approved May 13, 1938, made November 11 in each year a legal holiday: "a day to be dedicated to the cause of world peace and to be thereafter celebrated and known as 'Armistice Day'".

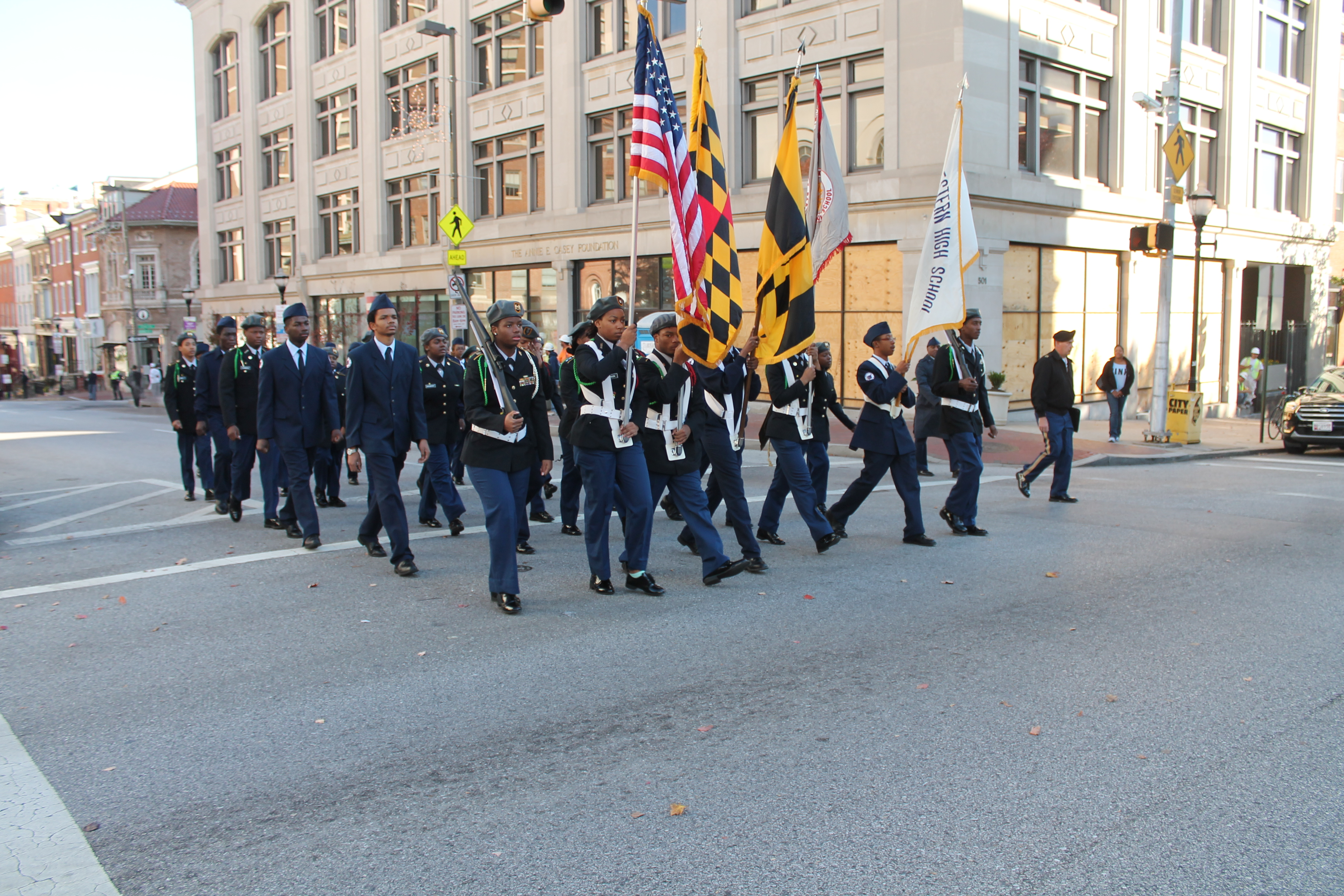
U.S. Army and Air Force Junior Reserve Officers' Training Corps cadets march during a Veterans Day parade in Baltimore, Maryland, 2016.

In 1945, World War II veteran Raymond Weeks from Birmingham, Alabama, had the idea of a national holiday that would honor all war veterans, living and dead, to be celebrated on Armistice Day. Weeks led a delegation to Gen. Dwight Eisenhower, who supported the idea of National Veterans Day. Weeks led the first national celebration in 1947 in Alabama and annually until his death in 1985. President Reagan honored Weeks at the White House with the Presidential Citizenship Medal in 1982 as the driving force for the national holiday. Elizabeth Dole, who prepared the briefing for President Reagan, determined Weeks as the "Father of Veterans Day".

U.S. Representative Ed Rees from Emporia, Kansas, presented a bill establishing the holiday through Congress. President Dwight D. Eisenhower, also from Kansas, signed the bill into law on May 26, 1954. It had been eight and a half years since Weeks held his first Armistice Day celebration for all veterans.

Congress amended the bill on June 1, 1954, replacing "Armistice" with "Veterans", and it has been known as Veterans Day since.

The National Veterans Award was also created in 1954. Congressman Rees of Kansas received the first National Veterans Award in Birmingham, Alabama, for his support in offering legislation to make Veterans Day a federal holiday.

Although originally scheduled for celebration on November 11, starting in 1971 in accordance with the Uniform Monday Holiday Act, Veterans Day was moved to the fourth Monday of October (October 25, 1971; October 23, 1972; October 22, 1973; October 28, 1974; October 27, 1975; October 25, 1976, and October 24, 1977). In 1978, it was moved back to November 11.

== Observance ==
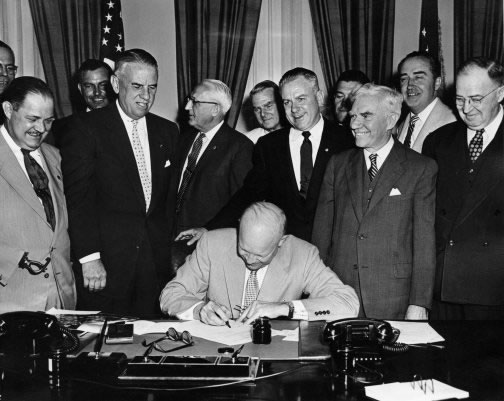
Eisenhower signing HR7786, June 1, 1954. This ceremony changed Armistice Day to Veterans Day.

Legally, two minutes of silence is recommended to be observed at 2:11 pm Eastern Standard Time.

Because it is a federal holiday, some American workers and many students have Veterans Day off from work or school. When Veterans Day falls on a Saturday then either Saturday or the preceding Friday may be designated as the holiday, whereas if it falls on a Sunday it is typically observed on the following Monday. When it falls on the weekend many private companies offer it as a floating holiday where employees can choose some other day. A Society for Human Resource Management poll in 2010 found that 21 percent of employers planned to observe the holiday in 2011.

Non-essential federal government offices are closed. No mail is delivered. All federal workers are paid for the holiday; those who are required to work on the holiday sometimes receive holiday pay for that day in addition to their wages.

Election Day is a regular working day, while Veterans Day, which typically falls the following week, is a federal holiday. In 2012, the National Commission on Federal Election Reform called for the holidays to be merged, so citizens can have a day off to vote, honoring veterans by exercising democratic rights.

=== Spelling of Veterans Day ===
While the holiday is commonly printed as Veteran's Day or Veterans' Day in calendars and advertisements, the United States Department of Veterans Affairs website states that the attributive (no apostrophe) rather than the possessive case is the official spelling "because it is not a day that 'belongs' to veterans, it is a day for honoring all veterans."

== See also ==
- Anzac Day – National day of remembrance
- National Independence Day (Poland) – National holiday celebrated in Poland on 11 November
- National Vietnam War Veterans Day – US federal observance
- Remembrance poppy – Artificial flower worn to commemorate military personnel who have died during war
- St. Martin's Day – Feast day of Saint Martin of Tours
- Volkstrauertag – Annual day of mourning in Germany
