= 1976 NAIA World Series =

1976 NAIA baseball tournament
- 1976 NAIA World Series
- Teams: 8
- Format: Double elimination
- Finals site: Phil Welch Stadium; St. Joseph, Missouri
- Champions: Lewis (IL) (3rd title)
- Winning coach: Gordie Gillespie
- MVP: Ken Jones (OF) (Lewis)

The 1976 NAIA World Series was the 20th annual tournament hosted by the National Association of Intercollegiate Athletics to determine the national champion of baseball among its member colleges and universities in the United States and Canada.

The tournament was again played at Phil Welch Stadium in St. Joseph, Missouri.

Two-time defending champions Lewis (IL) (47–15) defeated Lewis–Clark State (48–11) in a single-game championship series, 16–8, to win the Flyers' third NAIA World Series.

Lewis outfielder Ken Jones was named tournament MVP.

== Bracket ==
Upper round 1
Guilford	4
Emporia Kansas State	7
Kentucky State	7
Lewis–Clark State	2
George Mason	2
St. Mary's (TX)	1
Lewis (IL)	8
William Jewell	3

Upper round 2
Emporia Kansas State	0
Kentucky State	2
George Mason	3
Lewis (IL)	7
Lower round 1
St. Mary's (TX)	3
William Jewell	0
Guilford	1
Lewis–Clark State	4

Upper final
Kentucky State	6
Lewis (IL)	9
Lower round 2
Emporia Kansas State	9
St. Mary's (TX)	5
George Mason	8
Lewis–Clark State	17

Semifinals
Lewis (IL)	2
Emporia Kansas State	1
Kentucky State	4
Lewis–Clark State	6

Final
Lewis (IL)	16	–
Lewis–Clark State	8	–

== See also ==
- 1976 NCAA Division I baseball tournament
- 1976 NCAA Division II baseball tournament
- 1976 NCAA Division III baseball tournament (inaugural edition)
