= 1975 NAIA World Series =

1975 NAIA baseball tournament
- 1975 NAIA World Series
- Teams: 8
- Format: Double elimination
- Finals site: Phil Welch Stadium; St. Joseph, Missouri
- Champions: Lewis (IL) (2nd title)
- Winning coach: Gordie Gillespie
- MVP: Don Markelz (P) (Lewis)

The 1975 NAIA World Series was the 19th annual tournament hosted by the National Association of Intercollegiate Athletics to determine the national champion of baseball among its member colleges and universities in the United States and Canada.

The tournament was again played at Phil Welch Stadium in St. Joseph, Missouri.

In a rematch of the previous year's final, defending champions Lewis (IL) (52-16) defeated Sam Houston State (43-14) in a single-game championship series, 2–1, to win the Flyers' second NAIA World Series and becoming the first team to repeat as NAIA baseball champions.

Lewis pitcher Don Markelz was named tournament MVP.

== Bracket ==
Upper round 1
Lewis (IL)	4
Phillips	2
Missouri Western State	1
Sam Houston State	2
La Verne	8
UNC Wilmington	0
Birmingham–Southern	1
Eastern Connecticut State	3

Upper round 2
Lewis	4
Sam Houston State	1
La Verne	0
Eastern Connecticut State	3
Lower round 1
Phillips	6
Missouri Western State	7
UNC Wilmington	3
Birmingham–Southern	9

Upper final
Lewis	6
Eastern Connecticut State	5
Lower round 2
La Verne	4
Missouri Western State	1
Sam Houston State	10
Birmingham–Southern	5

Semifinals
Lewis	7
La Verne	1
Eastern Connecticut State	0
Sam Houston State	7

Final
Lewis	2	–
Sam Houston State	1	–

== See also ==
- 1975 NCAA Division I baseball tournament
- 1975 NCAA Division II baseball tournament
