= Terrin =

Terrin is a surname. Notable people with the surname include:

- Alessandro Terrin (born 1985), Italian swimmer
- Gianfranco Terrin (born 1985), Italian film and stage actor
- Peter Terrin (born 1968), Belgian writer
- Richard Terrin (1890–1958), American lawyer, military theorist, and historian
