= 1974 NAIA World Series =

1974 NAIA baseball tournament
- 1974 NAIA World Series
- Teams: 8
- Format: Double elimination
- Finals site: Phil Welch Stadium; St. Joseph, Missouri
- Champions: Lewis (IL) (1st title)
- Winning coach: Gordie Gillespie
- MVP: Tom Brennan (P) (Lewis)

The 1974 NAIA World Series was the 18th annual tournament hosted by the National Association of Intercollegiate Athletics to determine the national champion of baseball among its member colleges and universities in the United States and Canada.

After a four year absence, the tournament returned to Phil Welch Stadium in St. Joseph, Missouri.

Lewis (IL) (45-14) defeated Sam Houston State (42-11) in the single-game championship series, 3–2, to win the Flyers' first NAIA World Series.

Lewis pitcher, and future major leaguer, Tom Brennan was named tournament MVP.

== Bracket ==
Upper round 1
La Verne	4
Point Park	1
High Point	1
Lewis (IL)	4
Fort Hays State	0
Sam Houston State	5
David Lipscomb	6
Wisconsin–Oshkosh	0

Upper round 2
La Verne	7
Lewis	8
Sam Houston State	4
David Lipscomb	0
Lower round 1
Point Park	2
High Point	1
Fort Hays State	3
Wisconsin–Oshkosh	11

Upper final
Lewis	1
Sam Houston State	6
Lower round 2
David Lipscomb	1
Point Park	5
La Verne	8
Wisconsin–Oshkosh	2

Semifinals
Lewis	6
Point Park	3
Sam Houston State	2
La Verne	4

Preliminary final
La Verne	4
Sam Houston State	5

Final
Lewis	3
Sam Houston State	2

== See also ==
- 1974 NCAA Division I baseball tournament
- 1974 NCAA Division II baseball tournament
