= Rudy Awards =

- Awarded for: the High school and Division I college football players who demonstrate exemplary character, courage, contribution and commitment as members of their teams.
- Location: Henderson, Nevada
- Country: United States
- Presented by: The Rudy Foundation

History
- First award: 2007 (College); 2009 (High school)
- Most recent: Mark Herzlich (College); Calob Leindecker (High school)
- Website: http://www.collegerudyawards.com/ https://www.highschoolrudyawards.com/

The Rudy Awards were two awards given annually by the Rudy Foundation of Henderson, Nevada to the high school and Division I college football players who demonstrate exemplary character, courage, contribution and commitment as members of their teams.

== Eponym ==
The award is named in the honor of Daniel "Rudy" Ruettiger, who is famous as the inspiration for the 1993 film Rudy. Ruettiger strived to attend the University of Notre Dame and to play football for the Fighting Irish. Ruettiger battled with dyslexia and the fact that he was much smaller than an average football player, standing just 5 ft 6 in (1.68 m) and weighing 165 pounds (75 kg). Ruettiger eventually overcame these obstacles to gain admission to the university as a transfer and make the football team as a walk-on. In the only play in the only game of his college football career, he recorded a quarterback sack as fans cheered "RU-DY, RU-DY". Ruettiger is only one of two players in Fighting Irish history ever to be carried off the field on his teammates' shoulders.

In 1997, Ruettiger and his wife Cheryl founded the Rudy Foundation. The Rudy Foundation created the Rudy Award Program to benefit children's advocacy programs. The inaugural 2007 College Football Rudy Award was held on January 8, 2008, at the OpryLand Hotel in Nashville, Tennessee. The College Football Rudy Award was created by the Rudy Foundation and annually honors a Division I football player who demonstrates what Ruettiger refers to as "The Four C's": character, courage, contribution and commitment as a member of their team.

In 2009, a High school Rudy Award was established to honor inspirational athletes at the prep level. The annual winner will still exemplify “The Four C’s”: Character, Courage, Contribution and Commitment, just as for the collegiate award. $25,000 in Academic Scholarships will also be awarded to the Winner, two Runners-Up and a Fan Favorite.

== Eligibility criteria ==
=== College ===
Any Division I college football player that satisfies the following eligibility requirements may be nominated for the college Rudy Award:

• Nominees can be any gender, age, or year in the university (Freshman through Senior).
• Nominees must be a player on the football team roster at some point during the season of eligibility.
• Nominees does not have to be a walk-on, as Ruettiger was.

=== High school ===
Any high school football player that satisfies the following eligibility requirements may be nominated:

• Nominees can be any gender, age or year in High School (Freshman through Senior).
• Nominees can play on any level of a high school football team.
• Nominees must be on the football team at some point during the season of eligibility.

== Winners ==
=== Collegiate ===
Year	Player	Position	School
2007	Terry Clayton	LB	Kentucky
2008	Drew Combs	PK	TCU
2009	LeVon Morefield	RB	Akron
2010	Mark Herzlich	LB	Boston College

=== High school ===
Year	Player	Position	School
2009	Calob Leindecker	RB/CB	Parkview Baptist (Louisiana)
2010	Chance Anthony	WR	Breckinridge County (Kentucky)
2012	Visa Thach	LB	Kentwood (Washington)
