= Greta (band) =

American hard rock band (1990–1995)

- Origin: Los Angeles, California, United States
- Genres: Alternative rock; post-grunge; hard rock
- Years active: 1990–1995
- Label: Mercury
- Past members: Josh Gordon; Kyle Baer; Scott Carneghi; Brad Wilk; Paul Plagens

Greta was an American hard rock band formed in 1990 by Paul Plagens, Kyle Baer, Josh Gordon, and Brad Wilk.

Wilk left the band in 1991 to join Rage Against the Machine, and was replaced on the drums by Scott Carneghi who went on to co-found the band Buffalocomotive in 2012.

The band signed a two-record deal with Mercury Records in 1993 and released their debut album, No Biting, on September 21 of that year.. Their second and final album, This Is Greta, was released in 1995, after which the band was dropped from the label. Greta disbanded in 1995. On August 7, 2015, vocalist Paul Plagens died reportedly due to hepatitis c, according to early Greta roadie and close friend Mike Wilcox.

== Discography ==
=== Albums ===
- No Biting (1993)
- This Is Greta! (1995)

=== Singles and promos ===
- "Rocking Chair" (1993)
- "Revolver" (1993)
- "Love Is Dead" (1993)
- "Is It What You Wanted?" (1993)
- "Fathom" (1993)
- "Jesus Crux" (1994)
- "Nature" (1994)
- "About You" (1995)
- "Some People" (1995)
