= Al Gallagher =

American baseball player (1945–2018)

- Third baseman
- Born: October 19, 1945; San Francisco, California, U.S.
- Died: December 6, 2018 (aged 73); Fresno, California, U.S.
- Batted: Right Threw: Right

MLB debut
- April 7, 1970, for the San Francisco Giants

Last MLB appearance
- September 27, 1973, for the California Angels

MLB statistics
- Batting average: .263
- Home runs: 11
- Runs batted in: 130
- Stats at Baseball Reference

Teams
- San Francisco Giants (1970–1973); California Angels (1973)

Alan Mitchell Edward George Patrick Henry Gallagher (October 19, 1945 – December 6, 2018) was an American professional baseball player who played four seasons for the San Francisco Giants and California Angels of Major League Baseball. He played in 442 games during his career in which he had 1,264 at bats, 333 hits, 114 runs, 11 home runs, 130 RBIs, 42 doubles, 9 triples, and 7 stolen bases. He also had 164 strikeouts and was walked 138 times. Gallagher was the first San Francisco native to play for the Giants.

== Biography ==
In 1977, Gallagher managed the Texas City Stars of the Lone Star League, capturing the second half title. From 1995 to 1997 "Dirty Al" was the manager of the Bend Bandits (Bend, Oregon) of the Western Baseball League. From 1998 to 2000 he managed the Madison Blackwolf (Madison, WI) of the Northern League. In 2001 he was a bench coach for the Albany-Colonie Diamond Dogs (Albany, NY).In 2002, Al managed the Duluth–Superior Dukes of the Independent Northern League and stayed with the organization following its move to Kansas City following the 2002 season. From 2003 to 2006 he managed the Kansas City T-Bones in Kansas City, Kansas of the Northern League. On October 16, 2006, Al was fired by the T-Bones but quickly found work with the St. Joseph Blacksnakes of the American Association. He managed the Blacksnakes through the 2007 season, when the team disbanded.

Gallagher died on December 6, 2018, in Fresno, California. He was remembered by SFGate as "the first native San Franciscan to play for the Giants after they moved west and the third baseman on their 1971 National League West championship team."
