= 1993 NCAA Division II softball tournament =

- Format: Double-elimination tournament
- Finals site: Shawnee, Kansas
- Champions: Florida Southern (1st title)
- Runner-up: Augustana (SD) (2nd title game)
- Winning coach: Chris Bellotto (1st title)
- Attendance: 3,012

The 1993 NCAA Division II softball tournament was the 12th annual postseason tournament hosted by the NCAA to determine the national champion of softball among its Division II members in the United States, held at the end of the 1993 NCAA Division II softball season.

The final, four-team double elimination tournament, also known as the Division II Women's College World Series, was played in Shawnee, Kansas.

Emerging from the consolation bracket, Florida Southern defeated Augustana (SD) in both games of the double elimination championship series, 1–0 and 11–5, to capture the Moccasins' first Division II national title.

== Bracket ==
=== Finals ===
First rounds
Bloomsburg	1
Augustana (SD)	2
Florida Southern	4
UC Davis	1
Bloomsburg	1
UC Davis	2^{(11)}
Consolation bracket

Semifinals
Augustana (SD)	2
Florida Southern	1
Florida Southern	2
UC Davis	0

Championship series
Augustana (SD)	0	5
Florida Southern	1	11

== All-tournament team ==
- Traci Mescher, 1B, Augustana (SD)
- Jenny Maurer, 2B, Augustana (SD)
- Michelle Davis, SS, Florida Southern
- Kim Dean, 3B, UC Davis
- Jamie Gilbert, OF, Augustana (SD)
- Lisa Markle, OF, Bloomsburg
- Wanda Graham, OF, Florida Southern
- Katy Cortelyou, P, Florida Southern
- Signe DeJong, P, Augustana (SD)
- Jean Buskirk, C, Bloomsburg
- Angie Hopkins, AL, Augustana (SD)
- Jana Merten, AL, Florida Southern

== See also ==
- 1993 NCAA Division I softball tournament
- 1993 NCAA Division III softball tournament
- 1993 NAIA softball tournament
- 1993 NCAA Division II baseball tournament
