= Mark Herzlich =

American football player (born 1987)

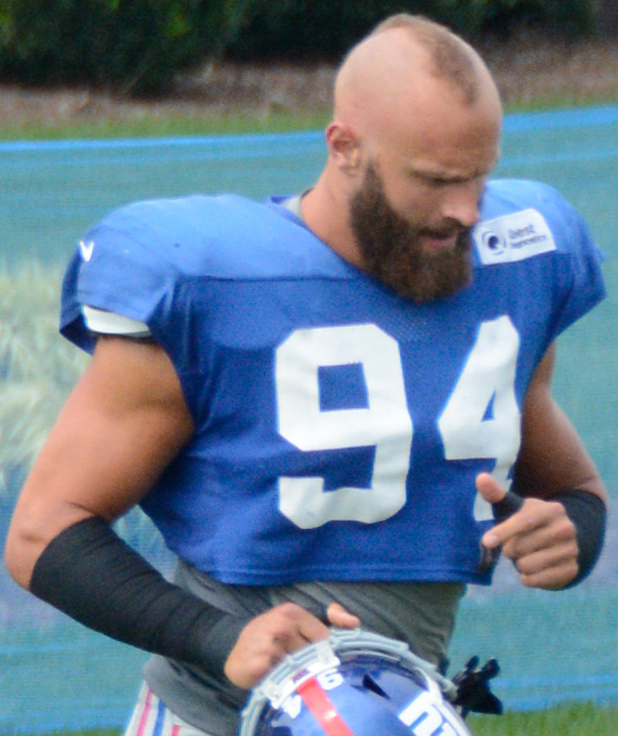
- Herzlich with the New York Giants in 2016

No. 44, 58, 94
- Position: Linebacker

Personal information
- Born: September 1, 1987 (age 39); Kirkwood, Missouri, U.S.
- Listed height: 6 ft 5 in (1.96 m)
- Listed weight: 236 lb (107 kg)

Career information
- High school: Conestoga (Berwyn, Pennsylvania)
- College: Boston College (2006–2010)
- NFL draft: 2011: undrafted

Career history
- New York Giants (2011–2017)

Awards and highlights
- Super Bowl champion (XLVI); Best Comeback Athlete ESPY (2011); Collegiate Rudy Award (2010); ACC Defensive Player of the Year (2008); ACC Brian Piccolo Award (2010); First-team All-American (2008); Nils V. "Swede" Nelson Award (2009); First-team All-ACC (2008)

Career NFL statistics
- Total tackles: 173
- Sacks: 1.0
- Forced fumbles: 1
- Stats at Pro Football Reference

Mark Herzlich Jr. (born September 1, 1987) is an American sports commentator and former professional football player. He played as a linebacker in the National Football League (NFL).

Herzlich played college football for the Boston College Eagles. He was signed by the New York Giants as an undrafted free agent in 2011 and played all seven seasons of his professional career with the Giants.

== Early life ==
Herzlich was born in Kirkwood, Missouri, the son of Barbara Read (born Martin), a former tennis player, and Sandon Mark Herzlich. His paternal grandfather's Ashkenazi Jewish family left Austria after the German annexation. His father was raised Jewish and converted to Protestantism when Herzlich was born. He has one sibling, younger brother Bradley Martin, who was a member of the football team at Brown University.

Herzlich attended Conestoga High School in Tredyffrin Township, Pennsylvania, where he earned Associated Press Class First-team AAAA All-State honors as senior linebacker. Considered a three-star prospect by Rivals.com, Herzlich was recruited by Boston College, Duke, North Carolina, Vanderbilt and Virginia. He was committed to Virginia some time before he chose to play for Boston College. He recorded 142 tackles and made four interceptions as a junior and also lined up at fullback in 2003 and 2004, scoring three offensive touchdowns. As a senior, he registered a team-high 153 tackles, including 48 solo stops, in 2005, and totaled eight tackles for loss, including four sacks; he also returned a blocked field goal 86 yards for a touchdown. He led the Pioneers to back-to-back Central League titles (2004 and 2005) and became the first player in school history to win the team MVP award three times. Herzlich was also a lacrosse star at Conestoga, and received a scholarship offer from Johns Hopkins University to play lacrosse.

== College career ==
Herzlich went on to attend Boston College and played in all 13 games as a true freshman. He earned College Football News Freshman All-American honors with a total of 42 tackles (32 solo), including 5.0 tackles for a loss and 1.0 sack, one interception and forced two fumbles. As a sophomore, he started all 14 games for the Eagles and finished the season second in total tackles with 97 (55 solos, 42 assists). He also led the team with 12 tackles-for-loss to go with 1.5 quarterback sacks and 4 pass breakups, 2 forced fumbles, 2 fumble recoveries. Herzlich entered his junior season (2008) as a preseason all-star candidate. He was named to the Lott Trophy and Butkus Award watchlists prior to the season. In 2008 Herzlich was a First-team All-American and the ACC Defensive Player of the Year. He was also a finalist for the Butkus Award, and a quarterfinalist for the Lott Trophy. He led the team with 110 tackles and 81 stops, six interceptions, eight pass break-ups, two forced fumbles, two fumble recoveries, and 13 tackles for a loss. In November 2008, Herzlich was a projected top-15 pick by many scouts for the 2009 NFL draft but announced his return to Boston College for the 2009 season.

Herzlich missed the entire 2009 season due to Ewing's sarcoma, a rare form of bone cancer, which he overcame and earned numerous honors for his courage and outreach, including the Disney Spirit Award, Nils V. "Swede" Nelson Award, an honorary Lott Trophy, and the ACC Commissioner's Cup.

In 2010, Herzlich returned to the football field and won the Rudy Award and the ACC's Brian Piccolo Award after starting all 13 games and finishing third on the team with 65 tackles and 50 solo stops. He tied for first on the team with two forced fumbles, second on the team with four interceptions and four pass break ups and also had 3.5 tackles for a loss.

== Cancer diagnosis ==
On May 14, 2009, Herzlich announced that he had been diagnosed with Ewing's sarcoma, a rare form of bone cancer, stating in a press release:

Obviously, I was shocked. I had been extremely focused on preparing for my senior season at Boston College and for life beyond that. Now, I must channel all that energy into facing my toughest opponent yet, and that is exactly what I will do...At this point, I do not know what this means for my football future, but I am determined to rid my body of this disease so that I can put that uniform back on. Thank you in advance for your prayers and concern. Together, we will fight this and win.

On September 29, 2009, Mark Herzlich announced that he was cancer free. This was confirmed by the team doctors. He publicly announced this during the ESPN and Home Depot College Gameday Special at Boston College on October 3, 2009. He sat out the remainder of the 2009 season and returned in 2010, registering five tackles (three solo) in the season-opening 38-20 win against FCS school Weber State.

Despite not playing college football in 2009, he received the Disney's Wide World of Sports Spirit Award for overcoming cancer, as well as the Nils V. "Swede" Nelson Award for sportsmanship. In January 2011, he received the "Most Courageous Athlete" award from the Philadelphia Sports Writers Association.

== Professional career ==
Pre-draft measurables
Height	Weight	Arm length	Hand span	40-yard dash	10-yard split	20-yard split	20-yard shuttle	Three-cone drill	Vertical jump	Broad jump	Bench press	Wonderlic
6 ft 4 in (1.93 m)	244 lb (111 kg)	32 3/8 in (0.82 m)	10 in (0.25 m)	4.91 s	1.71 s	2.76 s	4.46 s	7.32 s	32 1/2 in (0.83 m)	9 ft 4 in (2.84 m)	29 reps	34
All values from NFL Combine

Herzlich was not selected in the 2011 NFL draft even though he was invited to attend the event. After going undrafted, Herzlich was selected with the 51st pick of the 10th round by the Omaha Nighthawks of the UFL. Despite this, Herzlich stated that he would wait for an NFL contract rather than join the UFL.

On July 26, 2011, the New York Giants signed Herzlich to a three-year, $1.41 million contract as an undrafted free agent at the recommendation of owner John Mara. Herzlich made the New York Giants final 53 man roster. On November 20, 2011, Herzlich made his first NFL start against the Philadelphia Eagles. Set to become a free agent in 2014, he re-signed with the Giants on March 7, 2014.

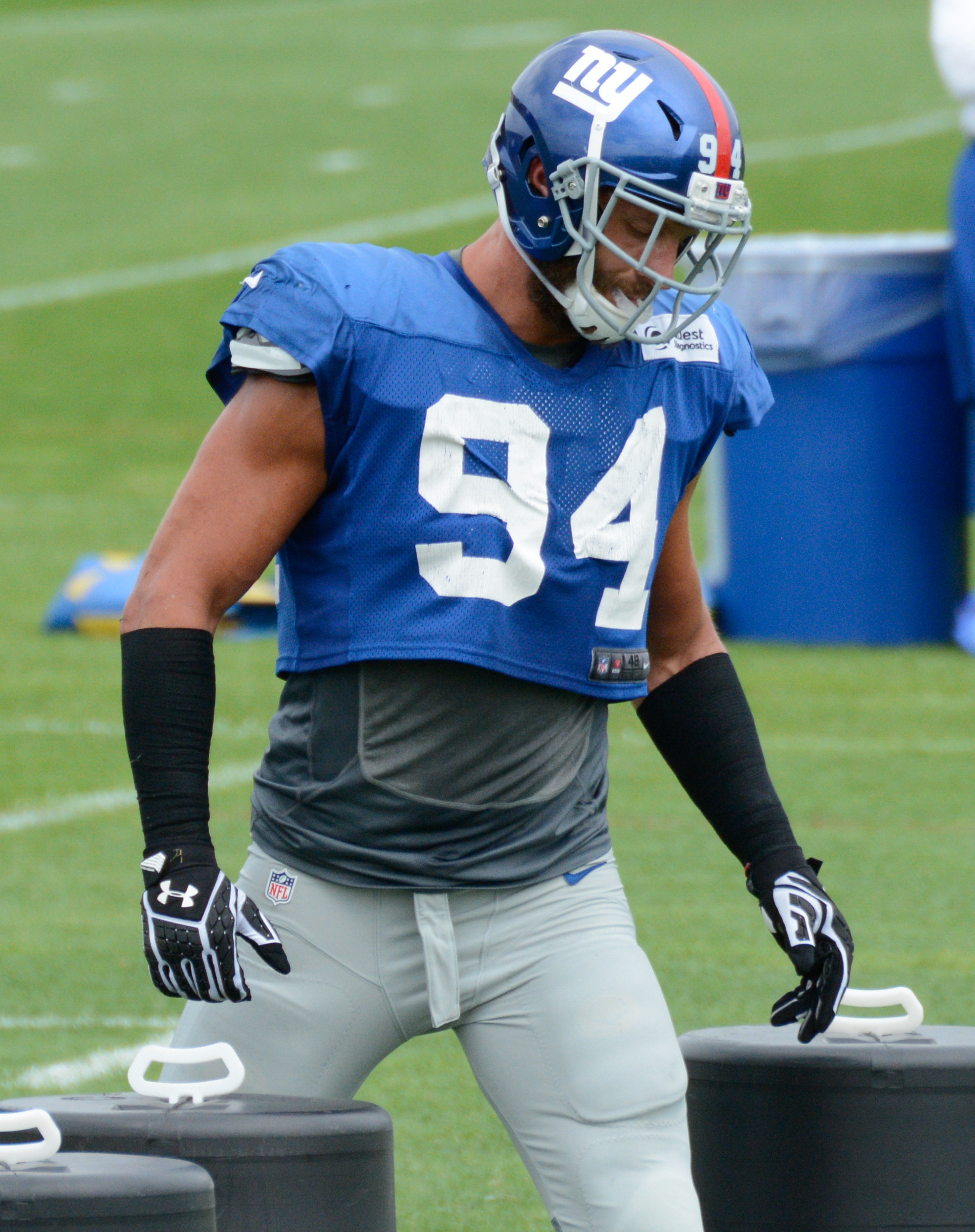
Herzlich in 2016

On March 20, 2017, Herzlich re-signed with the Giants. On September 2, 2017, he was placed on injured reserve after suffering a stinger in training camp.

On March 12, 2018, Herzlich re-signed with the Giants.

On September 1, 2018, Herzlich was released by the Giants.

== Post-playing career ==
Herzlich joined ACC Network following the end of his playing career, where he serves as a color commentator.

== Personal life ==
Herzlich is a Christian. He is married to Danielle Herzlich. They have three children.
