= Tears of the Enchanted Mainframe =

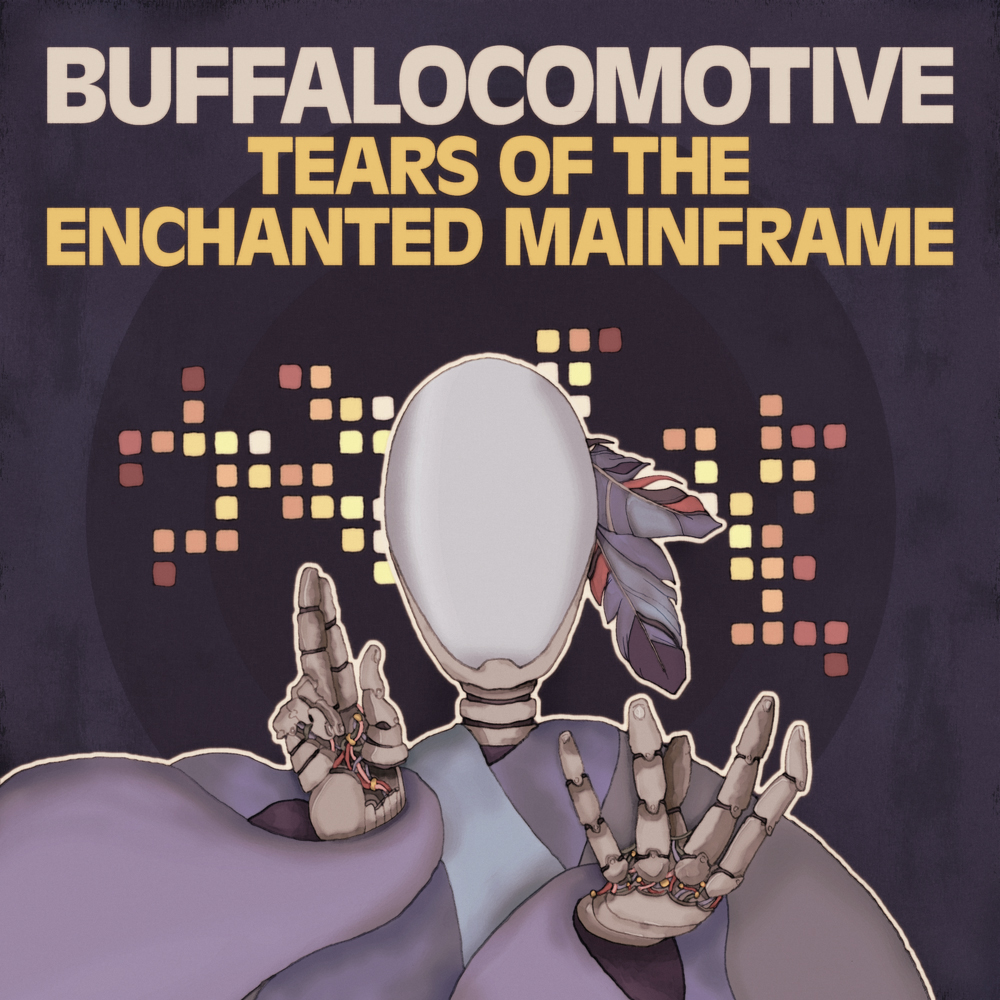

Studio album by Buffalocomotive
- Released: August 27, 2012
- Recorded: December 2005 – September 2011, Side Saddle Studios, Joliet, Illinois
- Genre: Hard rock
- Length: 47:23
- Language: English
- Producer: Buffalocomotive

Singles from Tears of the Enchanted Mainframe
- 1. "MedHed" Released: 2012

Tears of the Enchanted Mainframe is the debut album by the American Hard rock band Buffalocomotive, released worldwide via iTunes and Amazon MP3 on August 27, 2012. Buffalocomotive recorded the album in Chicago, Illinois and Las Vegas, Nevada between December 2005 and January 2012, with most of the recording conducted via telecommuting. The album established Buffalocomotive's desire to fuse heavy instrumentation with melodic vocals and cerebral lyrics that are both fantasy/science fiction-focused as well as being indicative of the human experience.

== Background ==
In 2005 drummer Scott Carneghi reunited with guitarist Marc Kaducak and bassist, vocalist Brahm Taylor, after several previous collaborations, to begin work on their debut effort. Taylor wrote new songs for the project and repurposed older material from his earlier tenure with Kaducak. The month before releasing Tears of the Enchanted Mainframe Kaducak suggested a re-branding and Taylor changed the band's name to Buffalocomotive.

== Recording and production ==
=== Recording sessions ===
The recording of the album commenced in December 2005 with the drum tracks for "Superusurper" and "MedHed" and concluded with a shaker track for "Tremendous And Wide" in January 2012.

All of the drum and guitar tracks were recorded at a private facility dubbed "Side Saddle Studios" in Joliet, Illinois with the majority of bass and vocal tracks being recorded remotely by Taylor in Las Vegas.

For the recordings, Kaducak played a 70's era Gibson ES-335TD, a 1993 Gibson Les Paul Studio, a 2007 Gibson SG Standard, and a 1985 G&L Cavalier along with Randall Amplifiers and a Marshall Stack. He also used a Takamine 12-string for the album's acoustic tracks. Kaducaks guitars were recorded with SM57's through a Randall 4x12 cabinet with Celestion Vintage 30 speakers. Taylor recorded with a Rickenbacker 4003 amplified through an Ampeg SVT with the majority of the album's bass sound being derived from a direct signal being processed through a Tech 21 SansAmp. Taylor's vocals were captured with an Audio-Technica AT4050 mic. Carneghi utilized several different DW drum kit configurations with Paiste Cymbals. His drums were captured using Shure Beta 52A on the kick, Shure SM57 on the snare, Sennheiser E604 on the toms and a pair of Oktava MC-012's on the overheads. A Royer R121 Ribbon was used to record the ambiance of the room during drum takes.

During the recording process drums and guitars went through a variety of preamps including a Rupert Neve Designs Portico 5012, an ART MPA tube preamp and the Steinberg MR816 preamps/audio interface. Analog to digital conversions were achieved through Steinberg, and in some cases Mytek, converters.

The album was recorded and mixed exclusively with Steinberg Cubase digital audio workstations on Microsoft windows operating systems with Waves SSL and Abbey Road TG12413 plugins. It was revealed that neither Brahm nor Marc know how to operate Autotune, so it was not used.

The songs were often performed to a click track, but there was no "snapping the drums to a grid", which is a popular computerized technique to ensure that drums are in perfect time while simultaneously sucking the life out of an otherwise real performance.

=== Production ===
Tears of the Enchanted Mainframe was produced and engineered by Taylor and Kaducak.

Backmasking is used on the track "Superusurper" during an interlude that features a reversed reading of a passage from the George Orwell novel Nineteen eighty four.

The album was mastered by Geoff Pesche and Alex Wharton at Abbey Road Studios in London.

== Title and artwork ==
Tears of the Enchanted Mainframe was an original title purportedly chosen to evoke the mental imagery of late 1960s science fiction novels.

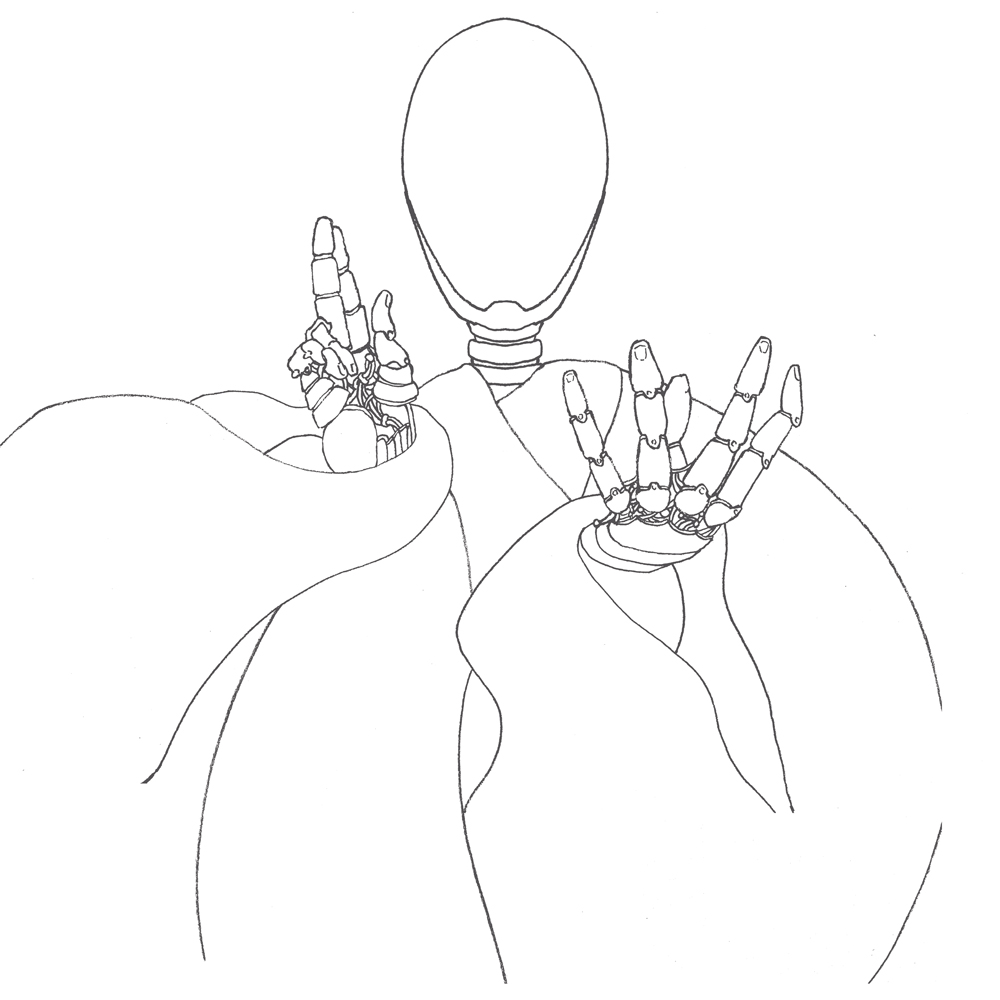

The album cover depicts a faceless android with right hand raised in benediction, donning flowing kasaya and war bonnet against a nimbus of blinkenlights. The portrait's artistic style and typography emulates a series of Philip K. Dick novels published by DAW Books in the early 1980s.

A loose Native American motif can be derived from the band's name (Buffalocomotive), the character depicted on the album cover (nicknamed "Geronimotor") and the album title in acronym form (totem).

The original idea for the cover involved a photograph of a young girl in funeral attire indulging in a tray of chocolate cupcakes each topped with a different esoteric symbol in white icing.

== Music and lyrics ==
To create interest through contrast, Buffalocomotive utilizes musical shifts in song dynamics, going from quiet to loud and vice versa, often placing gentler material against more aggressive fare. All Buffalocomotive songs are performed with the guitars tuned down one whole step from standard tuning with some tracks featuring an additional drop D tuning.

The lyrics of the song "Mint Green" personify paper money as an absolute monarch and use different shades of green, including emerald, forest and mint, as a metaphor for USD. An analogy is drawn between greed and opioid dependence early in the song.

Lyrically the song "Often The Orphan" draws comparisons to the uncanny frequency in which orphaned protagonists are featured in folklore, literature and film.

"Tremendous And Wide" was intended as a lament for victims of Fundamentalism, plastic shamanism and general magical thinking.

== Reception ==
Professional ratings
Review scores
Source	Rating
Sputnikmusic	3/4 stars
SNSPost	4/5 stars

In the United States the album received a positive review in the SNSPost where Kevin Abud wrote, in a review titled "Buffalocomotive: Tears Of The Enchanted Mainframe": "Tears of the Enchanted Mainframe is a masterful effort. Thirteen songs as powerful as the name of the band. Not since the likes of Sabbath have I heard anything with the kind of gusto and creative punches that can slap you in the face 13 times in a row".

Hernan M. Campbell of Sputnik Music said "I highly recommend this album to anyone looking for a quality and straightforward hard rock album" and "the music is proficient and orchestrated in an impactive fashion that fully entertains until the final second".

== Track listing ==
All tracks are written by Brahm Taylor and Marc Kaducak.

No.	Title	Length
1.	"Mutha Urth"	3:26
2.	"Often The Orphan"	3:45
3.	"MedHed"	3:37
4.	"Into The Desert"	4:22
5.	"Black Rose"	3:36
6.	"Making Friends"	2:47
7.	"Scratch Out The Sun"	2:39
8.	"Dot"	3:19
9.	"One Million Man"	3:35
10.	"Süperüsürper"	4:36
11.	"Mint Green"	3:27
12.	"Tremendous And Wide"	4:15
13.	"Goatspoke"	4:06

== Personnel ==
Buffalocomotive

- Brahm Taylor – bass guitar, lead vocals, production
- Marc Kaducak – acoustic, electric and slide guitar, backing vocals, production
- Scott Carneghi – drums, congas, percussion

Production

- Geoff Pesche and Alex Wharton – original mastering
- Brahm Taylor – cover design
- Marc Kaducak and Brahm Taylor – engineering, mixing
