= 1993 NCAA Division II baseball tournament =

- Season: 1993
- Finals site: Paterson Field; Montgomery, Alabama
- Champions: Tampa (2nd title)
- Runner-up: Cal Poly San Luis Obispo (vacated)
- Winning coach: Lelo Prado (2nd title)
- MOP: David Dion (OF) (Tampa)
- Attendance: 16,559

The 1993 NCAA Division II baseball tournament was the postseason tournament hosted by the NCAA to determine the national champion of baseball among its Division II colleges and universities at the end of the 1993 NCAA Division II baseball season.

The final, eight-team double-elimination tournament was played at Paterson Field in Montgomery, Alabama.

Defending champions Tampa defeated Cal Poly San Luis Obispo, 7–5, in the championship game, claiming the Spartans' second Division II national title. Cal Poly's participation in the tournament would later be vacated by the NCAA.

== Bracket ==
=== College World Series ===
First Round
North Dakota	6
Tampa	10
Mansfield	0
Troy State	5
North Dakota	6
Mansfield	9
Adelphi	12
USC Aiken	13
~~Cal Poly San Luis Obispo~~	5
UMSL	4
Adelphi	6
UMSL	4

Second Round
Tampa	13
Troy State	1
Mansfield	2
Troy State	7
USC Aiken	3
~~Cal Poly San Luis Obispo~~	4
Adelphi	7
USC Aiken	6

Semifinals
Tampa	4
Troy State	3
~~Cal Poly San Luis Obispo~~	6	11
Adelphi	7	5

Championship
Tampa	7
~~Cal Poly San Luis Obispo~~	5

== See also ==
- 1993 NCAA Division I baseball tournament
- 1993 NCAA Division III baseball tournament
- 1993 NAIA World Series
- 1993 NCAA Division II softball tournament
