= Tom Brennan (baseball) =

American baseball player (born 1952)

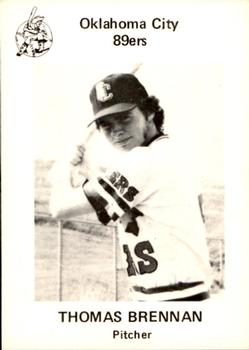
- Pitcher
- Born: October 30, 1952 (age 73); Chicago, Illinois, U.S.
- Batted: Right Threw: Right

MLB debut
- September 5, 1981, for the Cleveland Indians

Last MLB appearance
- May 27, 1985, for the Los Angeles Dodgers

MLB statistics
- Win–loss record: 9–10
- Earned run average: 4.40
- Strikeouts: 102
- Stats at Baseball Reference

Teams
- Cleveland Indians (1981–1983); Chicago White Sox (1984); Los Angeles Dodgers (1985)

Thomas Martin Brennan (born October 30, 1952) is an American former pitcher in Major League Baseball. He pitched from 1981 to 1985 for the Cleveland Indians, Chicago White Sox and Los Angeles Dodgers. He was called “The Grey Flamingo” for his odd pitching delivery of pausing briefly on one leg before continuing with his pitch. Vin Scully delighted in highlighting the nickname and pitching style during a nationally broadcast baseball game on Saturday, April 7, 1984, in which Jack Morris pitched a no-hitter.

Brennan played college baseball for Lewis University in Romeoville, Illinois, where he helped the Flyers win the 1974 NAIA World Series. He was additionally named the MVP of the tournament.

Brennan was inducted into the National College Baseball Hall of Fame in 2021.
