= Rudy Ruettiger =

American football player and motivational speaker (born 1948)

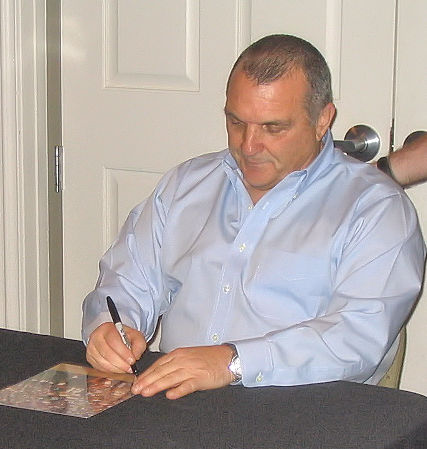
- Ruettiger signing autographs in 2009

No. 45
- Position: Defensive end

Personal information
- Born: August 23, 1948 (age 78); Joliet, Illinois, U.S.
- Listed height: 5 ft 6 in (1.68 m)
- Listed weight: 165 lb (75 kg)

Career information
- High school: Joliet Catholic
- College: Notre Dame (1974–1976)

Daniel Eugene "Rudy" Ruettiger (born August 23, 1948) is an American motivational speaker and author who played college football for the Notre Dame Fighting Irish. His early life and career at Notre Dame were the inspiration for the 1993 film Rudy.

== Biography ==
=== Early life and family ===
Daniel Eugene Ruettiger (nicknamed "Rudy") was born on August 23, 1948, in Joliet, Illinois. He was the third of 14 children and grew up with his German American family. Ruettiger did not excel scholastically, at least in part due to dyslexia. He attended Joliet Catholic High School and played for locally famous football coach Gordie Gillespie.

Ruettiger joined the United States Navy after high school, serving as a yeoman on a communications command ship for two years; he then worked in a power station for two years. Ruettiger applied to Notre Dame and was rejected due to his low high school grades. He enrolled and attended nearby Holy Cross College, and after two years was accepted as a student at Notre Dame after many tries, in the fall of 1974. It was during his time studying at Holy Cross that Ruettiger discovered he had dyslexia.

=== College ===
Ruettiger harbored a dream to play for the Notre Dame Fighting Irish football team, despite being undersized at 5 ft 6 in (1.68 m) and 165 lb (75 kg). Head coach Ara Parseghian encouraged walk-on players from the student body. For example, Notre Dame's 1969 starting center, Mike Oriard, was a walk-on who was eventually nominated for a Rhodes Scholarship and earned an NFL contract with the Kansas City Chiefs.

Ruettiger earned a place on the Notre Dame scout team, a squad that helps the varsity team practice for games. Merv Johnson was the coach who was instrumental in keeping Ruettiger on as a scout-team player.

After the 1974 season, Notre Dame coach Parseghian stepped down and former Green Bay Packers coach Dan Devine was named head coach. In the movie Rudy, Devine is given a somewhat antagonistic role, but Devine was actually one of Ruettiger's biggest motivators to return to the team. In Ruettiger's last opportunity to play for Notre Dame at home, Devine put him into a game as defensive end against Georgia Tech on November 8, 1975. During the final home game of Ruettiger's senior season, he recorded a sack, which is all his Notre Dame stat line has shown. Ruettiger actually played for three plays: a kickoff, an incomplete pass, and on the third play (the game's final play), he sacked Georgia Tech quarterback Rudy Allen. Ruettiger was carried off the field by his teammates following the game, the first player in Notre Dame history to be honored in this way. Only one other player has received this recognition: Marc Edwards in 1995.

=== Feature film ===
Ruettiger set up a successful maintenance company and also sold real estate. In 1986, he moved back to South Bend, Indiana, and decided to sell his story to be made into a film. Ruettiger's story was told in the 1993 feature film Rudy, which starred actor Sean Astin in the title role. The film was written by Angelo Pizzo and directed by David Anspaugh, both of whom were involved in Hoosiers. Ruettiger appeared in a cameo as a fan behind his father, played by Ned Beatty, during the final game scenes.

Ruettiger has said that the movie is "92% true." The players did not lay down their jerseys; rather, the team captain and one other player requested that he be allowed to play. Dan Devine is given a somewhat antagonistic role in the film, but Devine was actually one of Ruettiger's biggest motivators to return to the team. The groundskeeper named Fortune is a combination of three different people.

In 1999, Rudy was parodied in Sunday, Cruddy Sunday, an episode from season 10 of The Simpsons.

=== Later life ===
Ruettiger is a motivational speaker and author.

In 2011, Ruettiger was charged with securities fraud in connection with his role as Chairman of Rudy Beverage, Inc. The government alleged a pump and dump scheme. A settlement of the case required Ruettiger to pay $382,866 in fines. In his 2011 book, Rudy: My Story, Ruettiger writes of his dealings with the Securities and Exchange Commission and settlement for alleged securities fraud, stating, "I fell into the same obvious trap the rest of the country had fallen into in all of those boom years", and, "I shouldn't have been chasing the money."

In 2017, at age 68, Ruettiger was baptized a member of the Church of Jesus Christ of Latter-day Saints in Highland, Utah.

== Personal life ==
Ruettiger was previously married to Cheryl. Despite their divorce, Cheryl would still book all of his travels. He and Cheryl had two children.

== Honors, recognition, and awards ==
On October 14, 2005, Ruettiger appeared at a pep rally before the 2005 USC vs. Notre Dame football game, which Notre Dame ultimately lost in the last few seconds.

The inaugural 2007 College Football Rudy Award was held on January 8, 2008, at the Opryland Hotel in Nashville, Tennessee. The College Football Rudy Award was created by the Rudy Foundation and honors Division I football players who demonstrate what Ruettiger refers to as the "Four Cs": character, courage, contribution, and commitment as a member of their team. A similar award for high school students was created in 2009. Trusted Sports and Ruettiger launched the High School Football "Rudy" Awards, which aim to uncover the "Rudy" on every high school football team in America. Inspired by the College Football Rudy Awards, three finalists were announced on February 3, 2010. The winner, Calob Leindecker of Baton Rouge, Louisiana, received a college scholarship totaling $10,000. Two runners-up, Kyle Weafer of Kansas and Justin Ray Duke of Texas each received $5,000 scholarships.

In July 2009, Ruettiger was initiated into the Kappa Sigma fraternity at the Grand Conclave in San Antonio, Texas.

Ruettiger received honorary doctoral degrees from Holy Cross College, Mercy University, and Long Island University. He has been given key to the city at numerous cities across the nation along with special proclamations for his inspiration, commitment, and human spirit; one such proclamation from the governor of Nevada announced an Official Rudy Award Day.

== Publications ==
- Rudy's Insights for Winning in Life ISBN 978-0-9658119-1-0
- Rudy's Lessons for Young Champions ISBN 978-0-9658119-0-3
- Rudy & Friends ISBN 978-1-880692-39-4
- Rudy: My Story ISBN 978-0-718080-06-8
