= St. Joe Blacksnakes =

- 2006–2007; Saint Joseph, Missouri
Team logo
Cap insignia

Minor league affiliations
- Class: Independent (2006–2007)
- League: American Association (2006–2007)
- Division: North Division

Minor league titles
- League titles: none

Team data
- Name: St. Joe Blacksnakes (2006–2007)
- Colors: Black, magenta, silver, white
- Ballpark: Phil Welch Stadium (2006–2007)
- Owner/ Operator: Van Schley
- Manager: Al Gallagher

The St. Joe Blacksnakes were a minor league baseball team based in Saint Joseph, Missouri, that played as a member of the American Association of Professional Baseball from 2006-07 before disbanding.

For the league's inaugural 2006 season, the American Association consisted of five surviving Central Baseball League franchises, plus four clubs that defected from the established Northern League. The league's tenth club was originally awarded to Manhattan, Kansas, but facility obstacles proved too much to overcome and so the franchise was instead awarded to St. Joseph on November 8, 2005.

On December 16, 2005, the team announced that the primary owner would be Van Schley and that the field manager would be Chris Carminucci. On December 27, St. Joe acquired its first player — outfielder Jake Whitesides from New Jersey. On Tuesday January 10, pitchers Josh Jarman and Jason Navarro and infielder Josh Shaffer, all of whom played in the Golden Baseball League during the 2005 season, were added to the team.

The team announced its name and logo on February 10, 2006, becoming the Blacksnakes. St. Joseph played its first home game against the Sioux Falls Canaries on May 19, 2006, at Phil Welch Stadium.

The Blacksnakes played in the Northern Division both years. They finished third in each half of the 2006 season with a 26–22 record in the first half and 23–24 in the second half, for an overall record of 49–46 (.516) for the season. Attendance in that inaugural season was 59,107, for an average of 1,180. The team's manager in that first season was Chris Carminucci.

"Dirty" Al Gallagher was signed to manage the team for the 2007 season. The Blacksnakes finished fifth (last) in each half of the season, going a league-worst 34–62 (.354) for the entire season. The Blacksnakes tried a number of creative promotions, such as "Shave Your Head Like Britney Night", where fans could have their head shaved in exchange for free admission, but attendance still flagged. Attendance was a league-worst 30,244 (643 per game average). Following the addition of two new teams to the league and the cease of operations of the Coastal Bend Aviators, the Blacksnakes disbanded after the 2007 season.
