= Eric Raddatz =

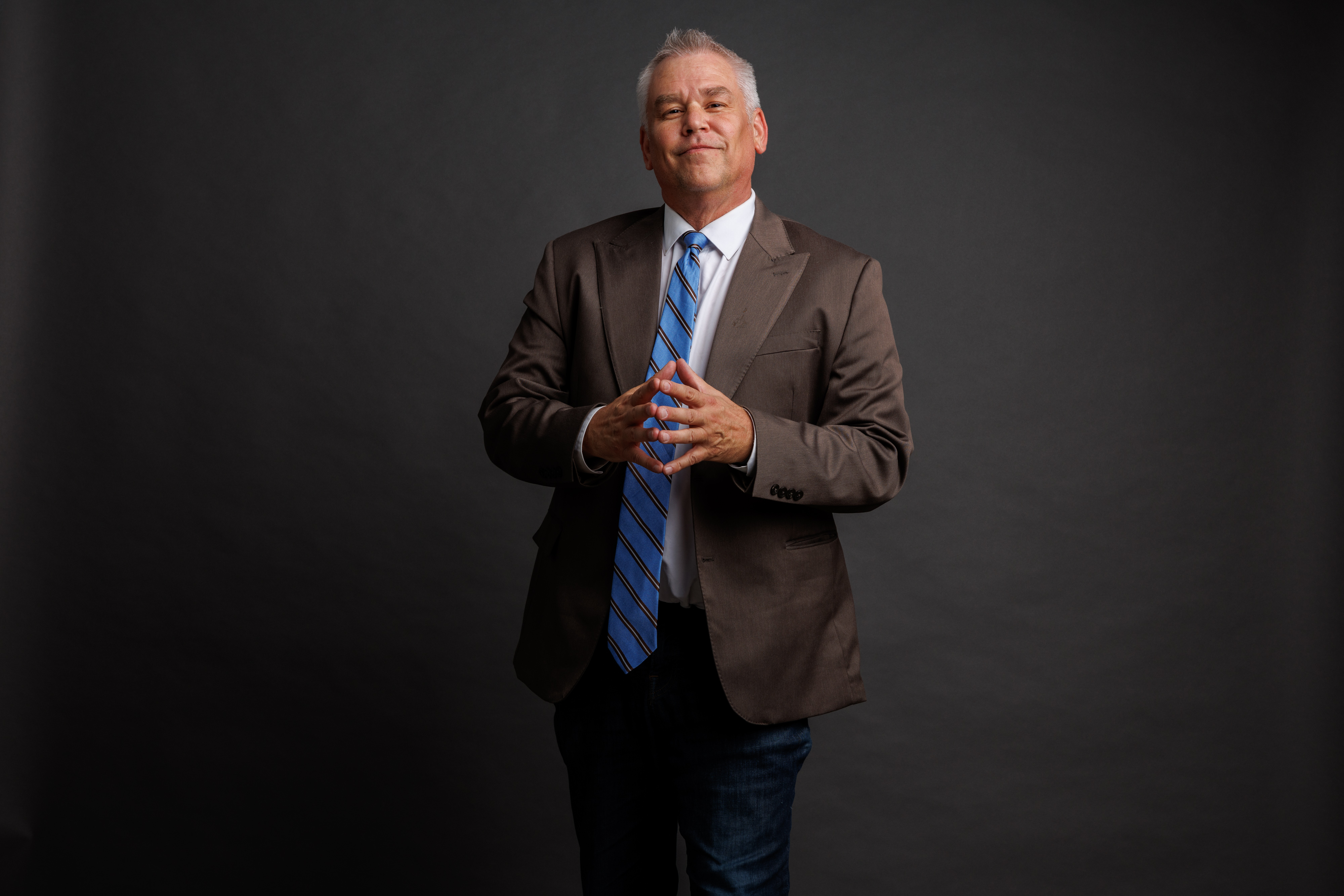
- Born: Joliet, Illinois
- Occupations: Journalist, filmmaker
- Years active: 1991–present

Eric Raddatz is an American journalist and filmmaker. He wrote, produced and directed independent films, including A Day to Love and Die and Barely a Chance. He is a co-founder of the Naples International Film Festival and the founder of the Fort Myers Film Festival.

== Life and career ==
Raddatz worked in newspaper design at Copley Chicago Newspapers and later worked for Gannett at The News-Press before joining Gulfshore Life. In 2007, he joined Florida Weekly as presentation editor of print and new media. He was later named editor of Florida Weekly's Fort Myers edition in September 2021.

Raddatz began working in film as an extra, including an appearance in Stir of Echoes.

In 2009, Raddatz co-founded the Naples International Film Festival with Rowan Samuel and Daniel Linehan. He later left the festival and founded the Fort Myers Film Festival in 2010. Its inaugural edition was held in March 2011.

In 2024, Raddatz became executive director of the Calusa Nature Center & Planetarium in Fort Myers.
