= Buffalocomotive =

American rock band

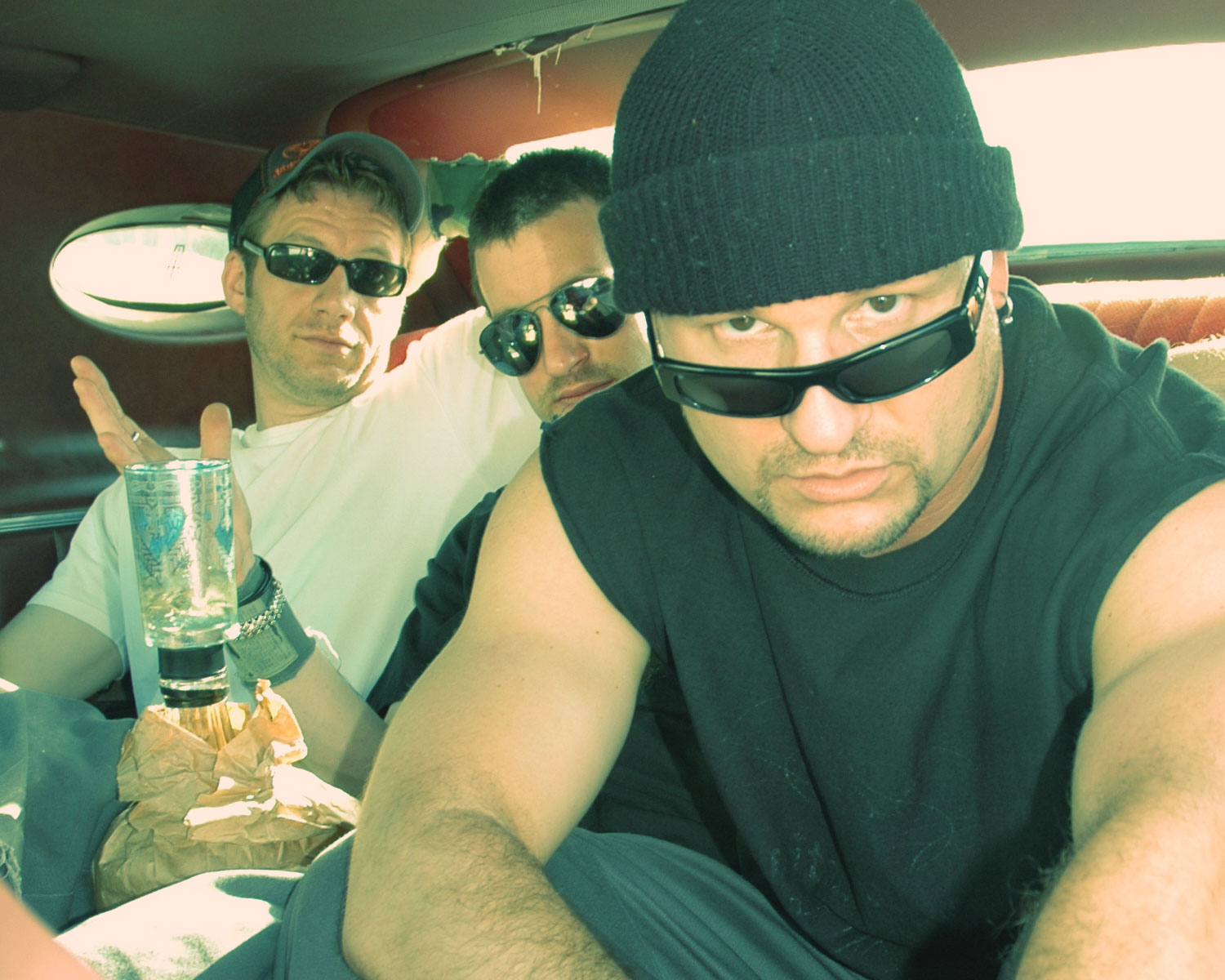
- Marc Kaducak, Scott Carneghi, and Brahm Taylor of Buffalocomotive

Background information
- Origin: Joliet, Illinois, USA
- Genres: Hard rock; progressive rock; power pop
- Years active: 2012–Present
- Members: Brahm Taylor; Marc Kaducak; Jim Shea
- Past members: Scott Carneghi
- Website: Buffalocomotive

Buffalocomotive is an American rock band formed in 2012, in Joliet, Illinois–a suburb of Chicago. The founding members, bassist/lead vocalist/lyricist Brahm Taylor and guitarist/backing vocalist Marc Kaducak, have been collaborating musically since 1987. The duo has teamed with a number of percussionists including drummer Scott Carneghi who joined Taylor and Kaducak to form a power trio, even prior to the Buffalocomotive moniker, after completing the final leg of the 2003 Ozzfest Tour with Grade 8. The current lineup includes drummer Jim Shea.

Buffalocomotive released their debut album Tears Of The Enchanted Mainframe in August 2012.

== History ==
=== Formation ===
Founding members Brahm Taylor and Marc Kaducak remained a collaborative constant throughout several musical projects in the Chicago area before recruiting former high school classmate Carneghi into the fold. In the early 1990s Taylor and Kaducak entered into an artist development deal with Al Jason and Peter Katsis, along with other up and coming Chicago artists Tung Twista and Monster Voodoo Machine, engaging in extensive recording sessions at Battery Studios Chicago under the tutelage of Ministry drummer and mixing engineer Stephen George.

During this time Scott Carneghi had relocated to Los Angeles, California where he replaced Brad Wilk as the drummer for Greta in 1991, when the latter left to join Rage Against the Machine. In 1993 Greta signed a two album deal with Mercury Records

In 2002 Scott, Brahm and Marc entered Star Trax Recording in Crestwood, Illinois to record a four song demo with engineer Jeff Luif. They shared the facilities with Chicago alumni Enuff Z'nuff who were recording the album Welcome to Blue Island at the time.

Buffalocomotive was the subject of a promotional photo shoot on September 7, 2005 in Las Vegas, Nevada that included several shots in and around the home and vehicle of actress, songwriter and all-time girlfriend of Ed Wood, Dolores Fuller. Fuller, who was portrayed by Sarah Jessica Parker in Tim Burton's 1994 Wood biographical film Ed Wood, can be seen lifting a roll of carpet in her driveway on the band's official homepage.

From September 22 to September 30 of 2006 the band consulted with music producer Michael Wagener to record several demo tracks at Accept guitarist Wolf Hoffmann's horse ranch in Nashville, Tennessee.

In July 2015 Chicago studio drummer Jim Shea, now living in San Diego, joined Buffalocomotive after a former guitar student of Brahms' introduced them.

=== Tears Of The Enchanted Mainframe ===
The soon-to-be Buffalocomotive in a recording session for the then untitled Tears Of The Enchanted Mainframe circa 2009.

In 2005 Carneghi returned to his native city of Joliet while Taylor relocated to Las Vegas, Nevada to produce the reality show Inked for the A&E Network. For several years, the group worked on their debut effort with the majority of collaboration being done via remote work. Taylor wrote new songs for the project and repurposed older material from his earlier tenure with Kaducak. The long distance sessions culminated in 13 previously unreleased tracks with audio mastering by Geoff Pesche and Alex Wharton at Abbey Road Studios in London, England.

Tears Of The Enchanted Mainframe was released internationally on August 27, 2012 and was deemed "a masterful effort" with "thirteen songs as powerful as the name of the band" with the album being "highly recommend to anyone looking for a quality and straightforward hard rock album" with music that is "proficient and orchestrated in an impactive fashion that fully entertains until the final second."

=== Gunmetal Gray and the Casket Kidd ===
On July 15 of 2015 Shea started preparing drum tracks for several songs from a 'weird west' concept album Taylor had begun writing in February 2009. The rock opera tells the linear story of the title characters, an eight-foot tall mechanical man that cries .45 Long Colt bullets and a peg legged albino Paiute, as they traverse an anachronistic late 18th century American southwest in an effort to vanquish a rash of vampiric beings presented more as a galactic plague than Earthly monsters. The album will feature twenty one songs and is intended by Taylor to serve as the soundtrack and musical basis for a stage show and/or film production.

== Musical style and influences ==
Buffalocomotive's music is a combination of hard rock and progressive rock but with the underlying sensibility and structure of power pop.

Taylor, known for his freethinking lyrics, pens concepts that deal with the darker aspects of theology, fantasy and science fiction but additionally encompasses such topics as the uncanny frequency of orphaned protagonists in fiction, the non-medical use of prescription medications and romanticized suicide amongst vampires. During his adolescence, Taylor also developed an intense interest in fantasy role-playing games, especially Dungeons & Dragons, a pastime which he still cites as a major influence on his songwriting.

To create interest through contrast, Buffalocomotive utilizes shifts in song dynamics, going from quiet to loud and vice versa, often placing gentler material against more aggressive fare.

All Buffalocomotive songs are performed with the guitars tuned down one whole step from standard tuning with some tracks featuring an additional drop D tuning.

The group strives to repackage the idiosyncrasies of the eccentric rock genres they emulate into structured melodic songs that are more palatable for the casual music connoisseur.

In addition to Black Sabbath and Led Zeppelin, to whom the band is sometimes compared, artists such as Uriah Heep, Dust, Rush, Elf, Jane's Addiction, Life of Agony, Veruca Salt and The Monkees have been cited as influences by members of the band.

== Instruments and equipment ==
Taylor records exclusively with two Rickenbacker 4003 bass guitars, affectionately called ‘Black’ and ‘Blue’ on account of their respective finishes, amplified through an Ampeg SVT full-stack with SVT-CL head and SVT-810 and SVT-215 cabinets.

Kaducak primarily records with Gibson and Heritage Guitars and uses Randall Amplification along with a 30th Anniversary Marshall Stack.

Carneghi used DW Drums, Paiste cymbals and Vater 2B drumsticks on Tears Of The Enchanted Mainframe.

== Band members ==
=== Current ===
- Brahm Taylor – lead vocals, bass guitar (2012–present)
- Marc Kaducak – guitar, backing vocals (2012–present)
- Jim Shea – drums (2015–present)

=== Former ===
- Scott Carneghi – drums (2012–2013)

== Discography ==
- Tears Of The Enchanted Mainframe (2012)

== Awards and accolades ==
Prior to the formation of Buffalocomotive, Taylor and Kaducak garnered the Musician (magazine) Best Unsigned Band In The Nation accolade and licensed songs to Fox Entertainment and A&E Television Networks.
