= Joliet Catholic Academy =

Location
- 1200 North Larkin Avenue; Joliet, Illinois 60435; United States; 41.5456°N 88.124°W

Information
- Type: private, coeducational, secondary, parochial
- Religious affiliation: Roman Catholic
- Established: 1990 (1869 as Saint Francis Academy, 1918 as De LaSalle High School)
- Founder: Mary Alfred Moes
- Oversight: Diocese of Joliet
- President: Jeffrey Budz
- Teaching staff: 53
- Grades: 9–12
- Enrollment: 600 (2021)
- Average class size: 21
- Campus type: Suburban
- Colors: Hilltopper Brown; Angel Blue
- Slogan: "Inspiring Growth in Knowledge and Faith"
- Athletics conference: Chicago Catholic League, Girls Catholic Athletic Conference
- Team name: Hilltoppers (m); Angels (f)
- Accreditation: North Central Association of Colleges and Schools
- Publication: 41—88
- Newspaper: The Victory View
- Tuition: $12,990
- Affiliation: Carmelites; Joliet Franciscan Sisters
- Website: http://www.jca-online.org

Joliet Catholic Academy (Joliet Catholic or JCA) is a coed Catholic high school in Joliet, Illinois. It is located in the Roman Catholic Diocese of Joliet. One of the oldest Catholic high schools in the Chicago area, Joliet Catholic is perhaps best known for its prowess in football. Since the advent of the Illinois High School Association (IHSA) state football playoffs in 1974, JCA is second for most State Championships with 15.

The modern school is the result of a merger between the all-girls St. Francis Academy and the all-male Joliet Catholic High School, which was formerly known as DeLaSalle High School for Boys. It is this merger that results in the school's shared affiliation with the Carmelites and the Joliet Franciscan Sisters.

== History ==
=== Founding ===
It was founded by James Dalton.The Joliet Franciscan Sisters opened St. Francis Academy in 1869 as an all-girls school. The academy was founded in a small stone building convent by Mother Mary Alfred Moes, who later would help found the Mayo Clinic. In 1923, the school moved to the campus of the University of St. Francis, which had opened in 1920. In 1956, the school moved to the building at 1200 N. Larkin, which is the current site of JCA.

George Cardinal Mundelein, Archbishop of Chicago, had the De La Salle Christian Brothers create a new high school for boys as a part of their renovation of St. Patrick Church in Joliet. The school opened in 1918 as DeLaSalle High School for Boys with only two classrooms in the parish center, but moved to a new building in 1927. In 1933, the Carmelites took possession of the school, at which time, the school became Joliet Catholic High School.

In the summer of 1990, Joliet Catholic High School and St. Francis Academy merged to form the modern Joliet Catholic Academy.

== Academics ==
A college preparatory high school, JCA places students in different academic programs based on their middle school grades, scores on the incoming freshmen placement exam, and scores on other applicable exams. The main academic levels include Accelerated/ Honors, Upper College Prep, and College Prep. Students may also opt to take Advanced Placement (AP) and Dual Credit courses through Joliet Junior College, and may qualify for the Honors Program, Academic Resource Center, or "Degree-in-Three" program through the University of St. Francis.

In terms of Advanced Placement (AP) courses, the school offers Biology, Chemistry, Physics, U.S. History, Government and Politics, Spanish, French, and European History. The school also offers two courses in AP English and AP Calculus. Dual credit options include Pre-Calculus, Statistics, Psychology 2, and English.

== Athletics ==
The men's teams at the school are referred to as the Hilltoppers, the same named used by the former Joliet Catholic High School, while the girls teams retain the name used by St. Francis Academy; the Angels. The school is a member of the Chicago Catholic League and Girls Catholic Athletic Conference.

The school sponsors teams for men and women in basketball, cross country, golf, soccer, tennis, track and field, volleyball, wrestling, and bass fishing. Men also compete in baseball and football, while women also compete in softball, competitive dance, and cheerleading.

The football team host home games at Joliet Memorial Stadium.

The following teams have finished in the top four of their respective state championship series sponsored by the IHSA:

- Baseball: State Champions (1993–94), (2008–09), (2012–13), (2021–22) (2022–23)
- Football: State Champions (1975–76, 1976–77, 1977–78, 1978–79, 1981–82, 1987–88, 1990–91, 1999–2000, 2000–01, 2001–02, 2003–04, 2004–05, 2007–08, 2018–19, 2021–22)
- Wrestling: State Champions (2021–22)
- Golf (boys):State Champions (1957–58)
- Volleyball (girls): State Champions (2003–04, 2007–08, 2008–09, 2009–10)
- Tennis (girls): 1 doubles team Madalyn Bauer and McCoy Hutchison won the IHSA Class 1A Doubles State Title (2016)
- Competitive Dance: State Champions (2018–19)
- Bass Fishing: State Champions (2022)

Of special note, the football team has won the second most football titles in the state, only behind another Carmelite school, Mount Carmel High School. Since the start of the IHSA State Tournament for football in 1974, JCA has qualified for the playoffs 46 times as of (2021-2022 Season)

== Notable alumni ==
=== Academics ===
- James Otteson (Class of 1986) is a philosopher and economist. Currently he is executive director of the Eudaimonia Institute, as well as professor of economics and Thomas W. Smith Presidential Chair in Business Ethics, at Wake Forest University. He is also a research professor in the Center for the Philosophy of Freedom and in the Philosophy Department at the University of Arizona and a Senior Fellow at The Fund for American Studies in Washington, D.C.

=== Arts ===
- Jim Downey (Class of 1970), comedy writer
- Melissa McCarthy (Class of 1988), actress and comedian.
- Brian Atwood, shoe designer

=== Public Service ===
- John R Lausch Jr. (Class of 1988), U.S. Attorney for Northern District of Illinois.
- Jack McGuire (Class of 1951), Member of the Illinois House of Representatives

=== Athletes ===
==== Baseball ====
- Rylan Bannon (Class of 2014), infielder in the New York Mets organization. Played for the Baltimore Orioles, Atlanta Braves, and Houston Astros
- Joe Benson (Class of 2006) was drafted after his senior year of high school by the Minnesota Twins in the second round (64th overall) of the 2006 MLB draft. Made his major league debut on September 6, 2011, for the Twins. His first major league hit was a single off of Detroit Tigers pitcher Max Scherzer on September 10, 2011. He began the 2012 season with the Twins' Triple-A affiliate Rochester Red Wings and did not return to the majors, ending his MLB career with 17 hits.
- Sean Bergman, former MLB player (Detroit Tigers, San Diego Padres, Houston Astros, Atlanta Braves, Minnesota Twins). A pitcher, he threw a shutout for the Tigers against the Milwaukee Brewers on May 11, 1995. He won 39 games between 1993 and 2000.
- Kevin Cameron (Class of 1998) is a former MLB pitcher who played for the San Diego Padres and the Oakland Athletics, appearing in 69 games. Was rated 72nd in Baseball America's Top 100 prospects and made all-state and all-area selections in 1998. Also set a state playoff record with 20 strikeouts in a game. Cameron was drafted out of high school by the Chicago White Sox in the 1998 MLB draft, but elected to attend Georgia Tech on scholarship instead. Cameron was drafted again in the 2001 MLB draft by the Minnesota Twins in the 13th round (377th overall pick).
- Mike Grace, former MLB player (Philadelphia Phillies), pitched for the Phillies from 1995 to 1999, winning 16 games.
- Mark Grant (Class of 1981) was a Major League Baseball pitcher from 1984 to 1993 and is now the color commentator for the San Diego Padres. Grant was selected in the first round of the 1981 MLB draft as the 10th overall selection by the San Francisco Giants.
- Bill Gullickson (Class of 1977), former MLB pitcher (Montreal Expos, Cincinnati Reds, New York Yankees, Houston Astros, Detroit Tigers). Selected as the second pick of the 1977 MLB draft, Gullickson spent 14 seasons in the majors, winning 162 games. He led the American League in wins during the 1991 season with 20. Gullickson's 18-strikeout game for the Expos is still a record for that franchise, which is now the Washington Nationals.
- Chris Michalak, former MLB player (Arizona Diamondbacks, Toronto Blue Jays, Texas Rangers, Cincinnati Reds), 1998–2006. He was pitching coach for the Harrisburg Senators, Class AA affiliate of the Washington Nationals, in 2017.
- Jack Perconte, former MLB player (Los Angeles Dodgers, Cleveland Indians, Seattle Mariners, Chicago White Sox) from 1980 to 1986. A second baseman, he had 180 hits and 29 stolen bases during the 1984 Mariners season, batting .294.

==== Basketball ====
- Terry Gannon (Class of 1981) played college basketball at North Carolina State, where he was a member of Jim Valvano's "Cardiac Pack" national championship-winning team in 1983. During his four-year career, (1981–85), he was a two-time Academic All-American and NC State's all-time leading free throw shooter. In 1983, he was the #1 three-point shooter in the nation. After a short basketball career in Europe, Gannon turned to broadcasting on the advice of his coach "Jimmy V."
- Ed Mikan was a professional basketball player in the BAA and its successor, the NBA (1948–54). A member of DePaul's 1945 National Invitation Tournament championship team, he was the fifth overall pick in the 1948 BAA draft.
- George Mikan (Class of 1942) was inducted into the Naismith Memorial Basketball Hall of Fame in 1959. Nicknamed "Mr. Basketball," Mikan played for DePaul University, then for the Chicago American Gears of the National Basketball League (NBL) and the Minneapolis Lakers of the NBL, the Basketball Association of America (BAA) and the National Basketball Association (NBA). Milan won seven NBL, BAA and NBA championships, an All-Star MVP trophy and three scoring titles. He was a member of the first four NBA All-Star and the first six All-BAA and All-NBA teams. Mikan was so dominant that he caused several rule changes in the NBA, among them the widening of the foul lane — known as the "Mikan Rule" — and the introduction of the shot clock. One of the founding fathers of the American Basketball Association, served as the league's commissioner. Played a critical role in the founding of the Minnesota Timberwolves. Mikan made the 25th and 35th NBA Anniversary Teams of 1970 and 1980 and was elected one of the NBA 50 Greatest Players in 1996. Since April 2001, a statue of Mikan shooting his trademark hook shot graces the entrance of the Timberwolves' Target Center.
- Allie Quigley (Class of 2004) currently plays in the WNBA as a member of the Chicago Sky and won the 2014 and 2015 WNBA Sixth Woman of the Year Award. She attended DePaul University and received honors such as Conference USA Freshman of the Year as well as two-time first team all Big East.

==== Football ====
- Mike Alstott (Class of 1992) was an NFL fullback and 6-time Pro Bowl selection for the Tampa Bay Buccaneers and was a member of the team that won Super Bowl XXXVII. He also played fullback for the Purdue Boilermakers, where he was three-time MVP and set nearly every school rushing record and several Big Ten Conference ones. Alstott was the 35th overall selection of the 1996 NFL draft.
- Josh Ferguson (Class of 2011) played football at the University of Illinois as a running back. Going undrafted, he was later signed by the NFL's Indianapolis Colts.
- Coby Fleener (Class of 2007) was selected with the second pick of the second round (34th overall) of the 2012 NFL draft by the Indianapolis Colts. He was the first tight end taken in that draft. Fleener attended Stanford University after becoming an all-conference, all-area, all-state and all-academic honoree during his senior season at Joliet Catholic Academy.
- Daniel Eugene "Rudy" Ruettiger (born August 23, 1948) is a motivational speaker who played college football at the University of Notre Dame. His early life and career at Notre Dame was the inspiration for the 1993 film Rudy.
- Tom Thayer (Class of 1979) was an NFL offensive lineman for the Chicago Bears, and was a member of the team that won Super Bowl XX. Thayer was the 91st overall selection of the 1983 NFL draft, having played college football for Notre Dame. He is currently a radio color commentator for the Bears.

==== Volleyball ====
- Kelly Murphy was Gatorade National Player of the Year in 2008. She played Division 1 volleyball for the University of Florida, where she was a four-time All-American. Murphy represented Team USA in the 2016 Rio de Janeiro Olympics, winning a bronze medal.

==== Wrestling ====
- Dean Hamiti (class of 2021) won three state championships while at Joliet Catholic, and went on to compete for Oklahoma State University.

== Notable staff ==
- Gordie Gillespie was the football coach from 1959 to 1985, leading the school to five state titles. He has also served as the head baseball coach at the University of St. Francis (1977–1995 and 2006–2010). He is the all–time leader in baseball coaching victories among American college coaches, recording his 1,800th career win on April 3, 2009. He was named NAIA "Baseball Coach of the Century", and was named by the Chicago Tribune as the Head Football Coach for the "All-Time Illinois High School Football Team".

== Controversies ==
=== "Operation After-School Special" drug sting ===
In January 2006, Joliet police launched an investigation into a report of drugs at JCA. By April, a sting operation dubbed "Operation After-School Special" yielded the arrests of five JCA students and four others connected to selling cocaine and ecstasy to an undercover officer. Eight of the nine people arrested were convicted for their part in selling drugs at JCA.

Since the scandal, JCA has implemented a drug testing procedure in which all students are tested in the first semester, with a random sample of 25% of students being tested again in the second semester. The procedure requires a hair sample from the student that, when properly analyzed in a laboratory, should reveal the presence of most major drugs, including cocaine and ecstasy, the drugs at the center of the infamous 2006 bust. Although new data is unavailable, JCA "touts [a high] drug testing success rate" of 99.996 as of 2012.
