= Gordie Gillespie =

American baseball, football and basketball coach (1926–2015)

Biographical details
- Born: April 14, 1926
- Died: February 28, 2015 (aged 88); Joliet, Illinois, U.S.

Coaching career (HC unless noted)

Football
- 1959–1985: Joliet Catholic HS (IL)
- 1986–1993: St. Francis (IL)

Basketball
- 1951–1965: Lewis

Baseball
- 1951: Joliet Catholic HS (IL)
- 1953–1976: Lewis
- 1977–1995: St. Francis (IL)
- 1996–2005: Ripon
- 2006–2011: St. Francis (IL)

Head coaching record
- Overall: 48–33 (college football); 1,893–952–2 (college baseball); 220–117 (college basketball); 222–54–6 (high school football)
- Tournaments: Football; 0–1 (NAIA D-II playoffs)

Accomplishments and honors

Championships
- Baseball.NAIA World Series (1974, 1975, 1976, 1993)
- College Baseball Hall of Fame; Inducted in 2009

Gordie Gillespie (April 14, 1926 – February 28, 2015) was an American baseball, football and basketball coach. He was a head baseball coach for 58 years at Lewis University, Ripon College, and the University of St. Francis. With a career coaching record of 1,893–952–2, Gillespie had the most wins of any coach in college baseball history until being passed by Augie Garrido of Texas in 2014. He had held that record since 1993 when he passed the prior record set by USC's Rod Dedeaux. He won his 1,800th game in April 2009 at age 82. He was also inducted into the College Baseball Hall of Fame in 2009.

== Playing career ==
Gillespie graduated from Kelvyn Park High School in Chicago, Illinois, and enrolled at DePaul University. He played basketball at DePaul under coach Ray Meyer and toured with the College All-Stars when they played the Harlem Globetrotters.

== Coaching career ==
At age 26, Gillespie began his head coaching career at Lewis University in 1953. He was the head coach at Lewis from 1953 to 1976 and compiled a record there of 634 wins and 241 losses. His Lewis teams won three straight NAIA World Series championships in 1974, 1975, and 1976. His Lewis baseball teams also finished among the top five teams nationally in 1962 (3rd), 1963 (5th), 1966 (2nd), 1971 (3rd), and 1972 (5th). Gillespie also coached the Lewis Flyers basketball team from 1950 to 1965.

Gillespie was the head baseball coach at Ripon College in Wisconsin for 10 years from 1996 to 2005. In 10 years at Ripon, he led the Ripon Red Hawks to a record of 239 wins and 130 losses. His Ripon teams advanced to the NCAA III playoffs six of his last seven years and won five league titles.

Gillespie served as the baseball coach at St. Francis from 1977 to 1995 and again from 2006 to 2010. During his first stint at St. Francis, he led his team to the World Series on eight occasions. His 1993 team won the National Championship, winning 38 of their final 39 games. His team finished in 5th place in 1978, 3rd place in 1985, 2nd place in 1989, 3rd place in 1990 and 5th place in 1995. Gillespie also served as the head coach of the women's basketball team at St. Francis from 1976 to 1993.

Gillespie has also had a successful career as a football coach. He was the head football coach at Joliet Catholic High School for 27 years and compiled a record there of 222 wins 54 losses and 6 ties. His Joliet football teams won five Illinois Class 5A state championships in 1975, 1976, 1977, 1978 and 1981. In 1991, Gillespie was selected by the Chicago Tribune as the head coach of the newspaper's All-Time Illinois High School Football Team. Gillespie also started the football program at St. Francis University in 1986.

In 1998, Gillespie was named the NAIA "Coach of the Century" by Collegiate Baseball Magazine.

Asked about retirement in 2006, Gillespie said, "God will retire me. He'll tell me when it's time."

Gillespie passed the St. Francis coaching reins to his assistant coach, Brian Michalak, for 2012. He died on February 28, 2015.

== Head coaching record ==
=== College football ===
Year	Team	Overall	Conference	Standing	Bowl/playoffs	NAIA^{#}
St. Francis Fighting Saints (NAIA Division II independent) (1986–1991)
1986	St. Francis	6–4				
1987	St. Francis	8–3			L NAIA Division II First Round	13
1988	St. Francis	6–4				
1989	St. Francis	8–2				13
1990	St. Francis	5–4				25
1991	St. Francis	6–5				
St. Francis Fighting Saints (NAIA Division II independent) (1992)
1992	St. Francis	4–5				
St. Francis Fighting Saints (Midwest Intercollegiate Football Conference) (1993)
1993	St. Francis	5–6	5–5	T–6th		
St. Francis:		48–33	5–5			
Total:		48–33				
^{#}Rankings from final NAIA Division II poll.

== See also ==
- List of college baseball career coaching wins leaders
