= Defense Audiovisual Agency =

The Defense Audiovisual Agency (DAVA) was a U.S. Department of Defense agency created In June 1979 to "provide centrally managed acquisition, distribution, and depository support and services for selected audiovisual products to all Department of Defense components." DAVA was located at Norton Air Force Base in California. Following reorganization directed by Secretary of Defense Caspar Weinberger, DAVA was disestablished on 30 September 1985 and its responsibilities were turned over to the military departments.
