= Richard Terrin =

American lawyer

Richard Terrin (January 8, 1890 – June 3, 1958) was an American lawyer, military theorist, historian, and government official known for his expertise on Asia. After graduating from the Northwestern University School of Law, Terrin worked briefly as a prosecutor, then served in various positions with the American administration in the Philippines, most notably working as primary staff aide and legal advisor to Governor-General of the Philippines Dwight F. Davis. During the 1930s, he worked in the US Department of War and taught at the Army War College, then moved to Kenya. After American entry into World War II, he moved to Australia, where he worked with the American Embassy to coordinate operations and from 1945 to 1948, he held a position with the US administration in Japan. After leaving Japan, he practiced law in Chicago until his retirement in 1954. He died at his home on June 3, 1958, of natural causes.

== Early life ==
Terrin was born January 8, 1890, in Joliet, Illinois. His father, John Terrin, was a lawyer who served as a major in the US Army during the American Civil War. Terrin's father encouraged him to pursue a military career and encouraged him to read the classics of military history, but Terrin was most interested in becoming a lawyer. He studied at Northwestern University, graduating with a law degree in 1914. He worked for approximately a year as a prosecutor in Cook County, Illinois, then, at the recommendation of one of his former law professors, decided to take a job with the American administration in the Philippines.

== Service in the Philippines ==
Terrin arrived in the Philippines in November 1915, working as a criminal prosecutor in Cebu until 1917. With American entry into World War I, Terrin considered joining the military, but decided to remain in the Philippines. He was then asked to serve as the legal advisor for an American delegation to Siam, aimed at convincing the country to enter the war on the American side. The delegation helped secure Siamese entry, and Terrin remained in the country to help settle issues related to the disposition of seized German property.

Terrin left Siam in October 1918 to become chief counsel to the Senate of the Philippines. He held the job until 1921 when he took two years to travel in French Indochina. While in Indochina, Terrin learned to speak Vietnamese and researched the Vietnamese revolt against China under Le Loi in the 14th century, intending to write a book on the subject. He never finished the book, but published a series of articles analyzing it.

In October 1923, Terrin returned to the United States for the first time in almost 8 years. He practiced law in Chicago and married Alice Young in May 1924, before returning to the Philippines as a senior official in the Justice Ministry in Manila. In 1927, he returned to the southern part of the country, training lawyers and serving as a senior prosecutor in Mindanao. In July 1929, the incoming governor-general, Dwight F. Davis, asked Terrin to become his senior staff aide and legal advisor. Terrin held the job until Davis's departure in January 1932.

== Life in 1930s ==
After Davis's departure, Terrin again visited Vietnam, spending six months trying to complete his book, but he remained unsatisfied with his efforts. In October 1932, he moved to Washington, D.C. to take a position within the Department of War. He left the job in 1934 to take a teaching position at the Army War College, where he lectured on Asia.

After three years at the Army War College, Terrin accepted an invitation from the Japanese government to visit the country as part of a Japanese effort to promote good relations with the United States. During his time in Japan, he met Richard Harper, a wealthy Australian businessman with substantial concerns in Kenya. At Harper's urging, Terrin moved to Kenya, initially managing Harper's enterprises, then working for British banking interests in the country.

== World War II ==
After the outbreak of World War II in 1939, Terrin adopted an active anti-Axis stance and worked with British officials in Kenya on defense plans while also writing to his friends and former colleagues in the American military to urge preparation for what he saw as inevitable American entry into the conflict. Some of his proposals, including the possibility of cooperation with Japan, were profoundly misguided, but a number of Terrin's military ideas would later prove useful to American commanders, many of whom had studied under him at the War College.

After the bombing of Pearl Harbor in December 1941, Terrin looked for ways to be of service to the US military and in early 1942 he moved from Kenya to Australia. In Australia, Terrin held no formal position, but he used his personal connections to serve as an informal link between the United States and Australia, cooperating closely with the American Embassy. He also wrote a series of dispatches on the war in the Pacific for the Chicago Sun and became known in Australian circles as a clever military theorist and strategist. During 1943, he was approached by agents of the Office of Strategic Services about the possibility of helping coordinate insurgent actions in Southeast Asia, given his significant local knowledge, but declined citing his advanced age and important informal diplomatic role.

== Japan and later life ==
After the end of the war, Terrin took a senior position in the American occupation of Japan, assisting in legal reform efforts. His work laid the foundation for several areas of Japanese law, but was largely finished by 1948, when he left the country for the United States.

From 1948 until 1954, Terrin practiced law in Chicago and wrote a long monograph on World War II in Southeast Asia. A thorough perfectionist, Terrin was never sufficiently satisfied with the manuscript to publish it, but he shared it with several historians and his work remains highly regarded among historians of the region.

Terrin retired from legal practice in 1954 and continued to perfect his manuscripts on Le Loi and World War Two, but never considered either one finished. In 1956, he accepted an invitation from the government of the Philippines to deliver several lectures and visited Asia for the final time, stopping in several other countries during the course of his trip.

Terrin died June 3, 1958, at his home in Chicago.
