= Lewis Flyers =

Athletic teams that represent Lewis University

- University: Lewis University
- Nickname: Flyers
- NCAA: Division II; Division I (men's volleyball)
- Conference: GLVC–East Division (primary); MIVA (men's volleyball)
- Athletic director: John Planek
- Location: Romeoville, Illinois
- Varsity teams: 22 (23 in 2026–27)
- Basketball arena: Neil Carey Arena
- Baseball stadium: Brennan Field
- Soccer stadium: Lewis Stadium
- Aquatics center: Lewis Pool
- Colors: Red and white
- Website: lewisflyers.com
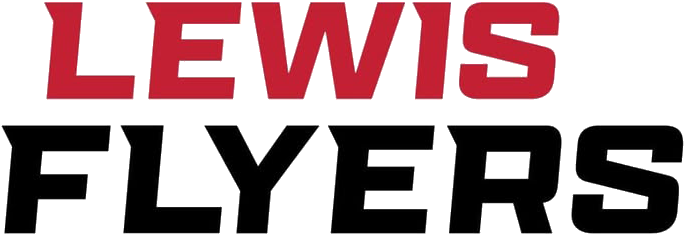

The Lewis Flyers are the athletic teams that represent Lewis University, located in Romeoville, Illinois, United States, in intercollegiate sports as a member of the Division II level of the National Collegiate Athletic Association (NCAA), primarily competing in the Great Lakes Valley Conference (GLVC) for most of its sports since the 1980–81 academic year; while its men's volleyball team competes in the Midwestern Intercollegiate Volleyball Association (MIVA). Since it is not a sponsored sport at the Division II level, the men's volleyball team is the only program that plays in Division I.

Prior to joining the NCAA, Lewis was a National Association of Intercollegiate Athletics (NAIA) member, primarily competing in the Chicagoland Collegiate Athletic Conference (CCAC) from 1954–55 to 1979–80.

== Varsity teams ==
Men's sports	Women's sports
Baseball	Basketball
Basketball	Bowling
Cross country	Cross country
Golf	Flag football (in 2026–27)
Lacrosse	Golf
Soccer	Lacrosse
Swimming	Soccer
Tennis	Softball
Track & field	Stunt
Volleyball	Swimming
	Tennis
	Track & field
	Volleyball

=== Baseball ===
As a member of the NAIA, the Flyers won the NAIA Baseball World Series in 1974, 1975, and 1976 and finished as runners-up in 1966 and 1980.

=== Track & field/cross country ===
The men's and women's track and field and cross country teams have had a long history of success, with 85 athletes being awarded All-American since 1988. Alum Isaac Jean-Paul, who won an NCAA Championship in the HJ, went on to win a World Championship in the Paralympics High jump in 2017 in London, jumping a world record 2.17m.

=== Men's volleyball ===
The men's volleyball team is the only program that plays in Division I, even though they are a Division II program. The Flyers have qualified for 9 Final Four appearances: 1996, 1998, 2003*, 2004, 2012, 2014, 2015, 2019 & 2021. In 2003 the men's volleyball team won the NCAA Division I/II National Collegiate Men's Volleyball Championship, defeating BYU in the final, but it later voluntarily gave back its title after an internal investigation found ineligibility issues that were kept private from the NCAA. This hurt the program for a few years, but they have slowly climbed their way back into the Top-10 rankings of DI-II schools. The Flyers qualified for the NCAA Championship and participated in the 1998 Final Four. In 1998 the Flyers also won their conference title. The Flyers were runners-up to Loyola Chicago in the 2015 NCAA Final. More recently, the Flyers won the MIVA Conference Tournament in both 2019 & 2021. During both seasons, they made it as far as the NCAA Final Four in their playoff push.

Despite being a full member of the GLVC, Lewis remains an MIVA member, as it was not listed among the inaugural members of GLVC men's volleyball in the spring 2026 season.

=== Women's volleyball ===
The women's volleyball team has qualified for 19 straight NCAA Regional Championships (2006-2024), having made it to the final 4 in 2016 and 2018

== Club sports ==
Lewis also competes intercollegiately in rugby as a member of the Chicago Area Rugby Football Union (CARFU).

== National championships ==
=== Team ===
Sport	Association	Division	Year	Runner-up	Score
Baseball (3)	NAIA (3)	Single (3)	1974	Sam Houston State	3–2
Baseball (3)	NAIA (3)	Single (3)	1975	Sam Houston State	2–1
Baseball (3)	NAIA (3)	Single (3)	1976	Lewis–Clark State	16–8
Volleyball (1)	NCAA (1)	Division 1	2003	BYU	3–2

Italics: (vacated) by the NCAA.

== Notable athletes ==
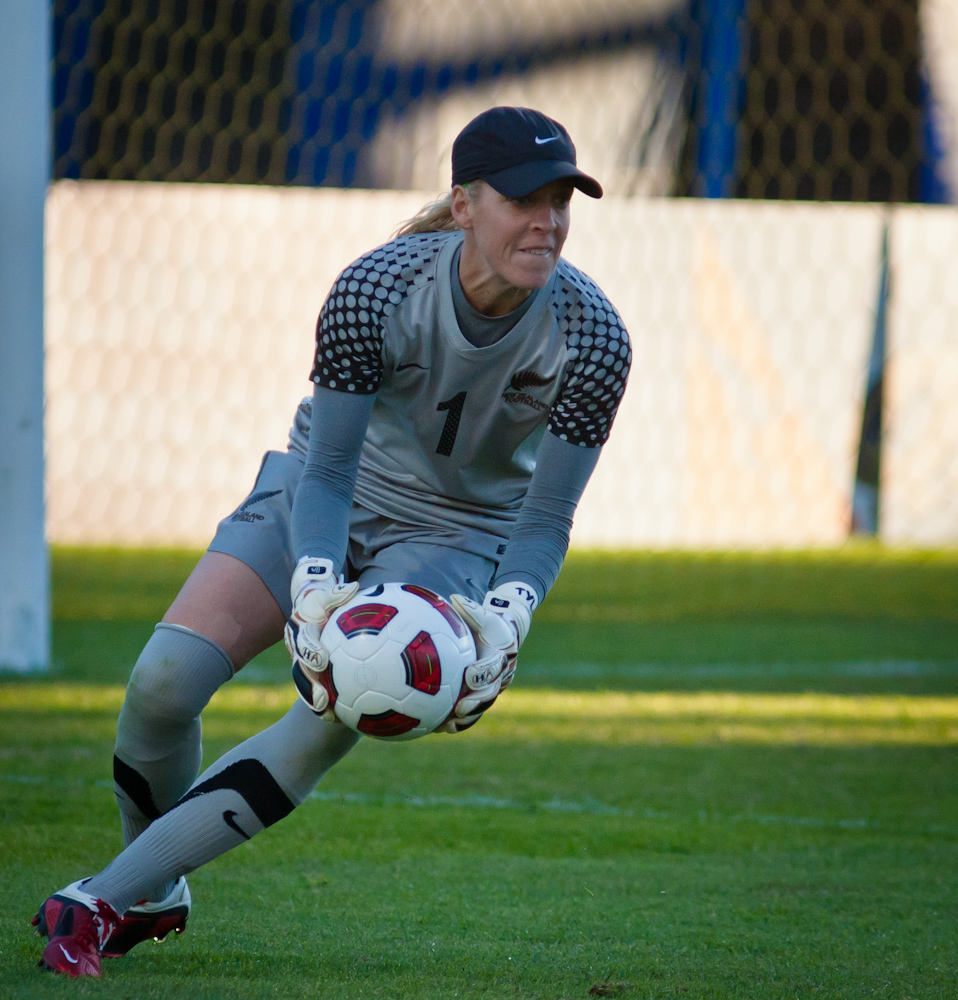
Jenny Bindon (soccer)

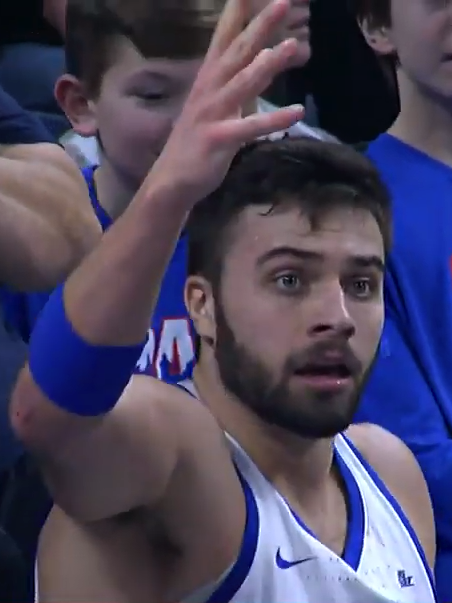
Max Strus (basketball)

- Jenny Bindon, goalkeeper for the New Zealand national soccer team at the 2007 and 2011 Women's World Cup, the 2008 Summer Olympics in Beijing, and the 2012 Summer Olympics in London
- John Dolinsky, German-American soccer player who played professionally in the Major Indoor Soccer League, American Soccer League, United Soccer League and American Indoor Soccer Association
- J. J. Furmaniak, professional MLB baseball player with the Tampa Bay Rays
- Rick Huisman, professional MLB baseball player with the Kansas City Royals
- Kristle Lowell, 2013 Team USA World Champion trampoline gymnast
- Wayne Molis, NBA center/forward (New York Knicks)
- George Schmidt, NFL Player for the 1952 Green Bay Packers and 1953 Chicago Cardinals
- Ed Spiezio, former third baseman in Major League Baseball who played from 1964 through 1972 for the St. Louis Cardinals, San Diego Padres and Chicago White Sox
- Paul Stevens, college baseball coach at University of Chicago
- Max Strus, professional basketball player, played at Lewis University for two seasons
- Ernie Young, baseball player with the Oakland A's and San Diego Padres
