= Phil Welch Stadium =

Baseball stadium in St. Joseph, Missouri, US

Coordinates: 39°44′18″N 94°49′38″W

Phil Welch Stadium is a baseball stadium in St Joseph, Missouri. It originally opened in 1939 as the home of the minor league St. Joseph Saints. It has a seating capacity of 3,600 and is located at 2600 SW Parkway in St. Joseph.

== History ==
Phil Welch Stadium opened as home of the St. Joseph Saints in 1939. The Saints had various other monikers and were a member of the Western Association (1939-1941, 1946-1951, 1953-1954). They were an affiliate of the St. Louis Cardinals (1946-1951, 1953), the Chicago Cubs (1939-1940), St. Louis Browns (1941) and the New York Yankees (1954). Hall of Fame players like Mickey Mantle and Willie Mays played games there while rising through the ranks.

In 1930, Hall of Fame member Dizzy Dean debuted his professional career with St. Joseph, going 17-8 in 32 games with a 3.69 ERA. In 1949, Hall of Fame member Earl Weaver played for the Saints.

Phil Welch Stadium was the home from 2006 to 2007 to the St. Joe Blacksnakes, a minor-league team competing in the American Association of Independent Professional Baseball.

Since 2009 the stadium has been the home of the Saint Joseph Mustangs, a collegiate summer baseball team competing in the M.I.N.K. League. Phil Welch was also the home park of the Missouri Western State University Griffons until the 2011 season.

Stadium dimensions are 320-420-320 (left to right). The lighting poles in the outfield are constructed out of metal lattice frame and are located within the field of play, creating scenarios of balls bouncing off the metal frame or getting caught inside the framework. A wall has been added to the field reducing dimensions of field of play to 307-400-307 (left to right). This wall places lighting poles outside of field of play.
