= Coastal Athletic Association baseball tournament =

Conference baseball championship

- Conference baseball championship
- Sport: Baseball
- Conference: Coastal Athletic Association
- Number of teams: 6
- Format: Modified Double-elimination
- Current stadium: Brooks Field
- Current location: Wilmington, NC
- Played: 1986–present
- Last contest: 2026
- Current champion: Northeastern
- Most championships: UNC Wilmington (8)
- Official website: CAASports.com baseball

Host stadiums
- Brooks Field (1989–90, 1993, 2004–2011, 2014, 2017, 2021, 2024, 2026); CofC Baseball Stadium at Patriots Point (2015–2016, 2023, 2025); Walter C. Latham Park (2022); Eagle Field at Veterans Memorial Park (2012-13, 2018–19); Coy Tillett Sr. Memorial Field (2000-2003); Grainger Stadium (1995-1999); Bud Metheny Baseball Complex (1994); Harrington Field (1986, 1991-92); The Diamond (1987-88)

Host locations
- Wilmington, NC (1989–90, 1993, 2004–2011, 2014, 2017, 2021, 2024, 2026); Mount Pleasant, SC (2015–2016, 2023, 2025); Elon, NC (2022); Harrisonburg, VA (2012-13, 2018–19); Manteo, NC (2000-2003); Kinston, NC (1995-1999); Norfolk, VA (1994); Greenville, NC (1986, 1991-92); Richmond, VA (1987-88)

The Coastal Athletic Association baseball tournament, sometimes referred to simply as the CAA Tournament, is the conference baseball championship of the NCAA Division I Coastal Athletic Association (formerly known as the Colonial Athletic Association up through the 2023 season). The top six finishers in the regular season of the conference's twelve baseball teams advance to the double-elimination tournament, whose most recent edition was held in 2026 at Brooks Field in Wilmington, North Carolina, the on-campus baseball home of the UNC Wilmington Seahawks. The winner of the tournament receives an automatic berth to the NCAA Division I Baseball Championship.

== Format ==
The first CAA Tournament in 1986 was a four team double-elimination tournament, with the bottom three finishers not participating. From 1987 through 1993, all six teams participated in a double-elimination tournament. After Old Dominion joined the league in 1992, the last place team did not participate in tournament. The CAA adopted a seven team format in 1994, with the top seed getting a bye and playing the winner of the opening round game between the four and five seeds. This format was used until VCU joined the conference in 1996 and the league adopted a traditional 8 team double-elimination tournament. After the conference shakeup prior to the 2002 season, the league split into divisions and brought six teams to the tournament. The two division champions were automatically in the field as the top two seeds, and the top four remaining finishers were seeded three through six. This format lasted only two years, as Drexel discontinued baseball and the league dropped to nine teams and eliminated divisions. The six team format survived through the 2009 season, and the league used a four team format for 2010 and 2011. The six team format was adopted again in 2012 and maintained through 2019. In the aftermath of the cancellation of the 2020 event due to the COVID-19 pandemic, the CAA decided to include all 9 teams in the tournament in 2021, with the bottom two seeds participating in a play-in game before the traditional double-elimination tournament.

== Champions ==
=== By year ===
The following is a list of conference champions and sites listed by year.

Year	Champion	Venue	MVP (Position)
1986	Richmond	Harrington Field • Greenville, NC	Kevin Sickinger, P/DH, Richmond
1987	East Carolina	The Diamond • Richmond, VA	Gary Smith, P, East Carolina
1988	George Mason	The Diamond • Richmond, VA	John Styles, P, George Mason
1989	East Carolina	Brooks Field • Wilmington, NC	Brien Berckman, P, East Carolina
1990	East Carolina	Brooks Field • Wilmington, NC	Calvin Brown, 1B, East Carolina
1991	East Carolina	Harrington Field • Greenville, NC	David Leisten, OF, East Carolina
1992	George Mason	Harrington Field • Greenville, NC	Chris Widger, C, George Mason
1993	East Carolina	Brooks Field • Wilmington, NC	Lyle Hartgrove, P, East Carolina
1994	Old Dominion	Bud Metheny Baseball Complex • Norfolk, VA	Matt Quataro, 1B/OF, Old Dominion
1995	Old Dominion	Grainger Stadium • Kinston, NC	Maika Symmonds, OF/P, Old Dominion
1996	Old Dominion	Grainger Stadium • Kinston, NC	Ron Walker, 3B/P, Old Dominion
1997	Richmond	Grainger Stadium • Kinston, NC	John Wagler, OF, Richmond
1998	Richmond	Grainger Stadium • Kinston, NC	Mike Dwyer, 1B/P, Richmond
1999	East Carolina	Grainger Stadium • Kinston, NC	James Molinari, OF, East Carolina
2000	East Carolina	Coy Tillett Sr. Memorial Field • Manteo, NC	Lee Delfino, SS, East Carolina
2001	William & Mary	Coy Tillett Sr. Memorial Field • Manteo, NC	Mike O'Kelly, 1B, William & Mary
2002	VCU	Coy Tillett Sr. Memorial Field • Manteo, NC	Brian Marshall, P, VCU
2003	VCU	Coy Tillett Sr. Memorial Field • Manteo, NC	Matt Prendergast, P, VCU
2004	UNC Wilmington	Brooks Field • Wilmington, NC	Matt Poulk, 3B, UNCW
2005	VCU	Brooks Field • Wilmington, NC	Tim St. Clair, 1B/DH, VCU
2006	UNC Wilmington	Brooks Field • Wilmington, NC	Chris Hatcher, C, UNCW
2007	VCU	Brooks Field • Wilmington, NC	John Leonard, P/OF, VCU
2008	James Madison	Brooks Field • Wilmington, NC	Alex Foltz, OF, James Madison
2009	Georgia State	Brooks Field • Wilmington, NC	Bradley Logan, 3B/1B, Georgia State
2010	VCU	Brooks Field • Wilmington, NC	Joe Van Meter, 3B, VCU
2011	James Madison	Brooks Field • Wilmington, NC	Johnny Bladel, OF, James Madison
2012	UNC Wilmington	Eagle Field at Veterans Memorial Park • Harrisonburg, VA	Jimmy, Yezzo, 1B, Delaware
2013	Towson	Eagle Field at Veterans Memorial Park • Harrisonburg, VA	Zach Fisher, 3B, Towson
2014	College of Charleston	Brooks Field • Wilmington, NC	Bailey Ober, P, College of Charleston
2015	UNC Wilmington	CofC Baseball Stadium at Patriots Point • Mount Pleasant, SC	Corey Dick, 1B, UNCW
2016	William & Mary	CofC Baseball Stadium at Patriots Point • Mount Pleasant, SC	Josh Smith, OF, William & Mary
2017	Delaware	Brooks Field • Wilmington, NC	Jeremy Ake, SS, Delaware
2018	UNC Wilmington	Eagle Field at Veterans Memorial Park • Harrisonburg, VA	Cole Weiss, 3B, UNC Wilmington
2019	UNC Wilmington	Eagle Field at Veterans Memorial Park • Harrisonburg, VA	Greg Jones, SS, UNC Wilmington
2020	Canceled due to the COVID-19 pandemic		
2021	Northeastern	Brooks Field • Wilmington, NC	Ben Malgeri, OF, Northeastern
2022	Hofstra	Walter C. Latham Park • Elon, NC	Brad Camarda, P, Hofstra
2023	UNC Wilmington	CofC Baseball Stadium at Patriots Point • Mount Pleasant, SC	Dillon Lifrieri, OF, UNCW
2024	UNC Wilmington	Brooks Field • Wilmington, NC	Trevor Marsh, UNCW
2025	Northeastern	CofC Baseball Stadium at Patriots Point • Mount Pleasant, SC	Harrison Feinberg, OF, Northeastern
2026	Northeastern	Brooks Field • Wilmington, NC	Andrew Wertz, P, Northeastern

=== By school ===
The following is a list of conference champions listed by school.

Program	Championships	Years
UNC Wilmington	8	2004, 2006, 2012, 2015, 2018, 2019, 2023, 2024
East Carolina	7	1987, 1989, 1990, 1991, 1993, 1999, 2000
VCU	5	2002, 2003, 2005, 2007, 2010
Northeastern	3	2021, 2025, 2026
Old Dominion	3	1994, 1995, 1996
Richmond	3	1986, 1997, 1998
George Mason	2	1988, 1992
James Madison	2	2008, 2011
William & Mary	2	2001, 2016
Charleston	1	2014
Delaware	1	2017
Georgia State	1	2009
Hofstra	1	2022
Towson	1	2013

- Italics indicate that the program is no longer a CAA member, as of the 2026 season.
