= 2006 Colonial Athletic Association baseball tournament =

American college baseball tournament

- Teams: 6
- Format: Double-elimination tournament
- Finals site: Brooks Field; Wilmington, North Carolina
- Champions: UNC Wilmington (2nd title)
- Winning coach: Mark Scalf (2nd title)
- MVP: Chris Hatcher (UNC Wilmington)

2006 Colonial Athletic Association baseball standings
	Conf.						Overall
Team	W		L		T	PCT	W		L		T	PCT
James Madison ‍†‍‍	22	–	8	–	0	.733	38	–	21	–	0	.644
Old Dominion ‍‍‍	21	–	9	–	0	.700	39	–	17	–	0	.696
Northeastern ‍‍‍	19	–	10	–	0	.655	27	–	23	–	0	.540
VCU ‍‍‍	18	–	11	–	0	.621	34	–	24	–	0	.586
UNC Wilmington ‍‍‡‍^{y}	17	–	13	–	0	.567	42	–	22	–	0	.656
Georgia State ‍‍‍	13	–	17	–	0	.433	26	–	31	–	0	.456
Delaware ‍‍‍	12	–	18	–	0	.400	30	–	24	–	0	.556
George Mason ‍‍‍	12	–	18	–	0	.400	20	–	31	–	0	.392
William & Mary ‍‍‍	11	–	19	–	0	.367	23	–	29	–	0	.442
Hofstra ‍‍‍	11	–	19	–	0	.367	24	–	31	–	1	.438
Towson ‍‍‍	8	–	22	–	0	.267	20	–	34	–	0	.370
‡ – Tournament champion y – Invited to the NCAA tournament As of June 30, 2006; Rankings from Collegiate Baseball

The 2006 Colonial Athletic Association baseball tournament was held at Brooks Field in Wilmington, North Carolina, from May 24 through 28. The event determined the champion of the Colonial Athletic Association for the 2006 season. Fifth-seeded UNC Wilmington won the tournament for the second time and earned the CAA's automatic bid to the 2006 NCAA Division I baseball tournament.

Entering the event, former member East Carolina had won the most championships, with seven. Among active members, Old Dominion and VCU led with three titles while George Mason had won twice and UNC Wilmington and William & Mary had each won once.

== Format and seeding ==
The top six teams from the CAA's round-robin regular season qualified for the tournament. Teams were seeded by conference winning percentage. They played a double-elimination tournament.

Team	W	L	Pct.	GB	Seed
James Madison	22	8	.733	—	1
Old Dominion	21	9	.700	1	2
Northeastern	19	10	.655	2.5	3
VCU	18	11	.621	3.5	4
UNC Wilmington	17	13	.567	5	5
Georgia State	13	17	.433	9	6
Delaware	12	18	.400	10	—
George Mason	12	18	.400	10	—
William & Mary	11	19	.367	11	—
Hofstra	11	19	.367	11	—
Towson	8	22	.267	14	—

== Bracket and results ==
First round
1	James Madison	7
6	Georgia State	0
3	Northeastern	3
4	VCU	10
2	Old Dominion	3
5	UNC Wilmington	7^{10}

Second round
1	James Madison	5
3	Northeastern	0
4	VCU	2
5	UNC Wilmington	8
6	Georgia State	6^{10}
2	Old Dominion	5

Third round
1	James Madison	9
5	UNC Wilmington	10
4	VCU	6
6	Georgia State	1

Semifinals
1	James Madison	1
4	VCU	6

Final
5	UNC Wilmington	7	7
4	VCU	14	6

== All-Tournament Team ==
The following players were named to the All-Tournament Team.

Name	Team
Chris Hatcher	UNC Wilmington
Lee McLean	UNC Wilmington
Matt Poulk	UNC Wilmington
Grayson Evans	UNC Wilmington
Bradley Holt	UNC Wilmington
Nate Anderson	VCU
Tim St. Clair	VCU
Scott Sizemore	VCU
Jared Bolden	VCU
Ryan Reid	James Madison
Mitchell Moses	James Madison

=== Most Valuable Player ===
Chris Hatcher was named Tournament Most Valuable Player. Hatcher was a catcher for UNC Wilmington.
