= 2011 Colonial Athletic Association baseball tournament =

American college baseball tournament

- Teams: 4
- Format: Double-elimination tournament
- Finals site: Brooks Field; Wilmington, North Carolina
- Champions: James Madison (2nd title)
- Winning coach: Spanky McFarland (2nd title)
- MVP: Johnny Bladel (James Madison)

2011 Colonial Athletic Association baseball standings
	Conf.				Overall
Team	W		L	PCT	W		L	PCT
James Madison ‍†‍‡‍^{y}	21	–	9	.700	40	–	17	.702
Old Dominion ‍‍‍	19	–	11	.633	30	–	26	.536
UNC Wilmington ‍‍‍	18	–	12	.600	31	–	28	.525
Georgia State ‍‍‍	17	–	13	.567	37	–	21	.638
Delaware ‍‍‍	16	–	14	.533	27	–	26	.509
William & Mary ‍‍‍	16	–	14	.533	26	–	29	.473
Towson ‍‍‍	15	–	15	.500	26	–	28	.481
VCU ‍‍‍	12	–	18	.400	22	–	32	.407
Northeastern ‍‍‍	12	–	18	.400	18	–	32	.360
Hofstra ‍‍‍	12	–	18	.400	15	–	32	.319
George Mason ‍‍‍	7	–	23	.233	21	–	32	.396
† – Conference champion ‡ – Tournament champion y – Invited to the NCAA tournament As of June 30, 2013; Rankings from Collegiate Baseball

The 2011 Colonial Athletic Association baseball tournament was held at Brooks Field in Wilmington, North Carolina, from May 26 through 28. The event determined the champion of the Colonial Athletic Association for the 2011 season. Second-seeded James Madison won the tournament for the second time and earned the CAA's automatic bid to the 2011 NCAA Division I baseball tournament.

Entering the event, former member East Carolina had won the most championships, with seven. Among active members, VCU led with five titles, Old Dominion had won three titles while George Mason and UNC Wilmington had won twice each and Georgia State, James Madison, and William & Mary had each won once.

== Format and seeding ==
The top four teams from the CAA's round-robin regular season qualified for the tournament. Teams were seeded by conference winning percentage. They played a double-elimination tournament.

Team	W	L	Pct.	GB	Seed
James Madison	21	9	.700	—	1
Old Dominion	19	11	.633	2	2
UNC Wilmington	18	12	.600	3	3
Georgia State	17	13	.567	4	4
Delaware	16	14	.533	5	—
William & Mary	16	14	.533	5	—
Towson	15	15	.500	6	—
VCU	12	18	.400	9	—
Northeastern	12	18	.400	9	—
Hofstra	12	18	.400	9	—
George Mason	7	23	.233	14	—

== Bracket and results ==
First round
1	James Madison	4
4	Georgia State	0
2	Old Dominion	0
3	UNC Wilmington	7
Lower round 1
4	Georgia State	3
2	Old Dominion	7

Semi-finals
1	James Madison	13
3	UNC Wilmington	7
Lower final
3	UNC Wilmington	3
2	Old Dominion	4

Finals
1	James Madison
2	Old Dominion

== All-Tournament Team ==
The following players were named to the All-Tournament Team.

Name	Team
Johnny Bladel	James Madison
D.J. Brown	James Madison
Matt Campbell	UNC Wilmington
Daniel Cropper	UNC Wilmington
Brent Frazier	Old Dominion
David Herbek	James Madison
Jake Lowery	James Madison
Phil McCarthy	Old Dominion
Matt Tenaglia	James Madison
Sean Tierney	James Madison
Ben Tomchick	Old Dominion
Alex Valadja	James Madison

=== Most Valuable Player ===
Johnny Bladel was named Tournament Most Valuable Player. Bladel was an outfielder for James Madison.
