= 2008 Colonial Athletic Association baseball tournament =

American college baseball tournament

- Teams: 6
- Format: Double-elimination tournament
- Finals site: Brooks Field; Wilmington, North Carolina
- Champions: James Madison (1st title)
- Winning coach: Spanky McFarland (1st title)
- MVP: Alex Foltz (James Madison)

2008 Colonial Athletic Association baseball standings
	Conf.						Overall
Team	W		L		T	PCT	W		L		T	PCT
UNC Wilmington ‍†‍‍^{y}	25	–	4	–	1	.850	44	–	17	–	1	.718
James Madison ‍‍‡‍^{y}	20	–	9	–	0	.690	39	–	19	–	0	.672
George Mason ‍‍‍	18	–	10	–	0	.643	30	–	25	–	0	.545
William & Mary ‍‍‍	16	–	13	–	0	.552	36	–	21	–	0	.632
Old Dominion ‍‍‍	14	–	14	–	0	.500	25	–	27	–	0	.481
Towson ‍‍‍	14	–	16	–	0	.467	30	–	28	–	0	.517
Northeastern ‍‍‍	12	–	17	–	1	.417	25	–	26	–	1	.490
Georgia State ‍‍‍	12	–	17	–	0	.414	33	–	23	–	0	.589
Delaware ‍‍‍	11	–	17	–	0	.393	22	–	31	–	0	.415
VCU ‍‍‍	8	–	17	–	0	.320	15	–	30	–	0	.333
Hofstra ‍‍‍	7	–	23	–	0	.233	19	–	36	–	0	.345
‡ – Tournament champion y – Invited to the NCAA tournament As of June 30, 2008; Rankings from Collegiate Baseball

The 2008 Colonial Athletic Association baseball tournament was held at Brooks Field in Wilmington, North Carolina, from May 21 through 24. The event determined the champion of the Colonial Athletic Association for the 2008 season. Second-seeded James Madison won the tournament for the first time and earned the CAA's automatic bid to the 2008 NCAA Division I baseball tournament.

Entering the event, former member East Carolina had won the most championships, with seven. Among active members, VCU led with four titles, Old Dominion had won three titles while George Mason and UNC Wilmington had won twice each and William & Mary had won once.

== Format and seeding ==
The top six teams from the CAA's round-robin regular season qualified for the tournament. Teams were seeded by conference winning percentage. They played a double-elimination tournament.

Team	W	L	T	Pct.	GB	Seed
UNC Wilmington	25	4	1	.850	—	1
James Madison	20	9	0	.690	5	2
George Mason	18	10	0	.643	6.5	3
William & Mary	16	13	0	.552	9	4
Old Dominion	14	14	0	.500	10.5	5
Towson	14	16	0	.467	11.5	6
Northeastern	12	17	1	.417	13	—
Georgia State	12	17	0	.414	13	—
Delaware	11	17	0	.393	13.5	—
VCU	8	17	0	.320	15	—
Hofstra	7	23	0	.233	18.5	—

== Bracket and results ==
First round
1	UNC Wilmington	11
6	Towson	5
3	George Mason	8^{10}
4	William & Mary	7
2	James Madison	6
5	Old Dominion	1

Second round
1	UNC Wilmington	8
4	William & Mary	11
6	Towson	17
5	Old Dominion	10
2	James Madison	9
3	George Mason	4
1	UNC Wilmington	9
3	George Mason	14

Third round
4	William & Mary	7
6	Towson	16
2	James Madison	18
3	George Mason	14

Final
6	Towson	1	—
2	James Madison	6	—

== All-Tournament Team ==
The following players were named to the All-Tournament Team.

Name	Team
Steven Caseres	James Madison
Brian Conley	Towson
Alex Foltz	James Madison
Greg Furmanek	Towson
Sean Grieve	William & Mary
Brad Holt	UNC Wilmington
Kurt Houck	James Madison
Trevor Knight	James Madison
Scott Krieger	George Mason
Turner Phelps	James Madison
Mike Sheridan	William & Mary

=== Most Valuable Player ===
Alex Foltz was named Tournament Most Valuable Player. Foltz was an outfielder for James Madison.
