= 2010 Colonial Athletic Association baseball tournament =

American college baseball tournament

- Teams: 4
- Format: Double-elimination tournament
- Finals site: Brooks Field; Wilmington, North Carolina
- Champions: VCU (5th title)
- Winning coach: Paul Keyes (5th title)
- MVP: Joe Van Meter (VCU)

2010 Colonial Athletic Association baseball standings
	Conf.						Overall
Team	W		L		T	PCT	W		L		T	PCT
James Madison ‍†‍‍	18	–	6	–	0	.750	30	–	23	–	0	.566
Georgia State ‍‍‍	17	–	6	–	1	.729	34	–	23	–	1	.595
VCU ‍‍‡‍^{y}	16	–	7	–	1	.688	34	–	26	–	1	.566
UNC Wilmington ‍‍‍	13	–	11	–	0	.542	33	–	27	–	0	.550
George Mason ‍‍‍	11	–	13	–	0	.458	28	–	22	–	0	.560
Old Dominion ‍‍‍	11	–	13	–	0	.458	24	–	30	–	0	.444
Towson ‍‍‍	11	–	13	–	0	.458	19	–	36	–	0	.345
William & Mary ‍‍‍	10	–	14	–	0	.417	27	–	24	–	0	.529
Hofstra ‍‍‍	10	–	14	–	0	.417	20	–	28	–	1	.418
Delaware ‍‍‍	9	–	15	–	0	.375	27	–	24	–	0	.529
Northeastern ‍‍‍	5	–	19	–	0	.208	13	–	31	–	0	.295
† – Conference champion ‡ – Tournament champion y – Invited to the NCAA tournament As of June 30, 2010; Rankings from Collegiate Baseball

The 2010 Colonial Athletic Association baseball tournament was held at Brooks Field in Wilmington, North Carolina, from May 27 through 29. The event determined the champion of the Colonial Athletic Association for the 2010 season. Second-seeded VCU won the tournament for the first (and only) time and earned the CAA's automatic bid to the 2010 NCAA Division I baseball tournament.

Entering the event, former member East Carolina had won the most championships, with seven. Among active members, VCU led with four titles, Old Dominion had won three titles while George Mason and UNC Wilmington had won twice each and Georgia State, James Madison, and William & Mary had each won once.

== Format and seeding ==
The top four teams from the CAA's round-robin regular season qualified for the tournament. Teams were seeded by conference winning percentage. They played a double-elimination tournament.

Team	W	L	T	Pct.	GB	Seed
James Madison	18	6	0	.750	—	1
Georgia State	17	6	1	.729	.5	2
VCU	16	7	1	.688	1.5	3
UNC Wilmington	13	11	0	.542	5	4
George Mason	11	13	0	.458	7	—
Old Dominion	11	13	0	.458	7	—
Towson	11	13	0	.458	7	—
William & Mary	10	14	0	.417	8	—
Hofstra	10	14	0	.417	8	—
Delaware	9	15	0	.375	9	—
Northeastern	5	19	0	.208	13	—

== Bracket and results ==
First round
1	James Madison	8
4	UNC Wilmington	7
2	Georgia State	4
3	VCU	7
Lower round 1
1	James Madison	3
3	VCU	6

Semi-finals
4	UNC Wilmington	10
2	Georgia State	8
Lower final
1	James Madison	1
4	UNC Wilmington	3

Finals
3	VCU
4	UNC Wilmington

== All-Tournament Team ==
The following players were named to the All-Tournament Team.

Name	Team
Daniel Cropper	UNC Wilmington
Seth Cutler‑Voltz	VCU
Brett Garner	James Madison
Matt Holt	UNC Wilmington
Tyler McSwain	UNC Wilmington
Robbie Monday	UNC Wilmington
Doug Otto	VCU
Thomas Pope	UNC Wilmington
Hunter Ridge	UNC Wilmington
Joe Van Meter	VCU
Jonathan Watson	VCU

=== Most Valuable Player ===
Joe Van Meter was named Tournament Most Valuable Player. Van Meter was a third baseman for VCU.
