= 2004 Colonial Athletic Association baseball tournament =

American college baseball tournament

- Teams: 6
- Format: Double-elimination tournament
- Finals site: Brooks Field; Wilmington, North Carolina
- Champions: UNC Wilmington (1st title)
- Winning coach: Mark Scalf (1st title)
- MVP: Matt Poulk (UNC Wilmington)

2004 Colonial Athletic Association baseball standings
	Conf.				Overall
Team	W		L	PCT	W		L	PCT
George Mason ‍†‍‍^{y}	20	–	4	.833	39	–	19	.672
UNC Wilmington ‍‍‡‍^{y}	17	–	6	.739	40	–	23	.635
William & Mary ‍‍‍	14	–	10	.583	37	–	20	.649
VCU ‍‍‍	14	–	10	.583	34	–	24	.586
Old Dominion ‍‍‍	13	–	11	.542	26	–	28	.481
Delaware ‍‍‍	12	–	11	.522	33	–	24	.579
James Madison ‍‍‍	8	–	16	.333	28	–	26	.519
Towson ‍‍‍	6	–	18	.250	17	–	35	.327
Hofstra ‍‍‍	3	–	21	.125	14	–	36	.280
† – Conference champion ‡ – Tournament champion y – Invited to the NCAA tournament As of June 30, 2004; Rankings from Collegiate Baseball

The 2004 Colonial Athletic Association baseball tournament was held at Brooks Field in Wilmington, North Carolina, from May 26 through 29. The event determined the champion of the Colonial Athletic Association for the 2004 season. Second-seeded UNC Wilmington won the tournament for the first time and earned the CAA's automatic bid to the 2004 NCAA Division I baseball tournament.

Entering the event, former member East Carolina had won the most championships, with seven. Among active members, Old Dominion led with three titles while George Mason and VCU had each won twice and William & Mary had won once.

== Format and seeding ==
The top six teams from the CAA's round-robin regular season qualified for the tournament. Teams were seeded by conference winning percentage. They played a double-elimination tournament.

Team	W	L	Pct.	GB	Seed
George Mason	20	4	.833	—	1
UNC Wilmington	17	6	.739	2.5	2
William & Mary	14	10	.583	6	3
VCU	14	10	.583	6	4
Old Dominion	13	11	.542	7	5
Delaware	12	11	.522	7.5	6
James Madison	8	16	.333	12	—
Towson	6	18	.250	14	—
Hofstra	3	21	.125	17	—

== Bracket and results ==
First round
1	George Mason	5
6	Delaware	6^{10}
3	William & Mary	3
4	VCU	4
2	UNC Wilmington	6
5	Old Dominion	4

Second round
6	Delaware	7
4	William & Mary	3
3	VCU	3
2	UNC Wilmington	12
1	George Mason	11
5	Old Dominion	5

Third round
6	Delaware	3
2	UNC Wilmington	2
3	VCU	3
1	George Mason	11

Semifinals
2	UNC Wilmington	3
1	George Mason	1

Final
6	Delaware	7	3
2	UNC Wilmington	8	15

== All-Tournament Team ==
The following players were named to the All-Tournament Team.

Name	Team
Bruce Baldwin	George Mason
Jarame Beaupre	Delaware
Brock Donovan	Delaware
Chip Grawey	UNC Wilmington
Ronald Hill	UNC Wilmington
Mike Mihalik	Delaware
Jeff Moore	UNC Wilmington
Jeff Palumbo	George Mason
Matt Poulk	UNC Wilmington
Tim Preston	UNC Wilmington
Scott Rambo	Delaware
Scott Sizemore	VCU
Brian Valichka	Delaware

=== Most Valuable Player ===
Matt Poulk was named Tournament Most Valuable Player. Poulk was a third baseman for UNC Wilmington.
