= 2007 Colonial Athletic Association baseball tournament =

American college baseball tournament

- Teams: 6
- Format: Double-elimination tournament
- Finals site: Brooks Field; Wilmington, North Carolina
- Champions: VCU (4th title)
- Winning coach: Paul Keyes (4th title)
- MVP: John Leonard (VCU)

2007 Colonial Athletic Association baseball standings
	Conf.				Overall
Team	W		L	PCT	W		L	PCT
VCU ‍†‍‡‍^{y}	18	–	11	.621	37	–	21	.638
Old Dominion ‍†‍‍	18	–	11	.621	35	–	24	.593
Delaware ‍†‍‍	18	–	11	.621	32	–	23	.582
UNC Wilmington ‍†‍‍	18	–	11	.621	29	–	27	.518
George Mason ‍‍‍	14	–	14	.500	27	–	27	.500
Georgia State ‍‍‍	15	–	15	.500	26	–	32	.448
William & Mary ‍‍‍	13	–	16	.448	29	–	25	.537
Northeastern ‍‍‍	12	–	17	.414	24	–	22	.522
James Madison ‍‍‍	11	–	17	.393	22	–	31	.415
Towson ‍‍‍	11	–	18	.379	21	–	30	.412
Hofstra ‍‍‍	11	–	18	.379	20	–	34	.370
‡ – Tournament champion y – Invited to the NCAA tournament As of June 30, 2007; Rankings from Collegiate Baseball

The 2007 Colonial Athletic Association baseball tournament was held at Brooks Field in Wilmington, North Carolina, from May 23 through 26. The event determined the champion of the Colonial Athletic Association for the 2007 season. Third-seeded VCU won the tournament for the fourth time and earned the CAA's automatic bid to the 2007 NCAA Division I baseball tournament.

Entering the event, former member East Carolina had won the most championships, with seven. Among active members, Old Dominion and VCU led with three titles while George Mason and UNC Wilmington had won twice each and William & Mary had won once.

== Format and seeding ==
The top six teams from the CAA's round-robin regular season qualified for the tournament. Teams were seeded by conference winning percentage. The top four seeds were awarded by tiebreakers as VCU, Old Dominion, Delaware, and UNC Wilmington all finished with the same record in conference. George Mason earned the fifth seed by tiebreaker over Georgia State, as the Patriots and Panthers had the same conference winning percentage. They played a double-elimination tournament.

Team	W	L	Pct.	GB	Seed
Old Dominion	18	11	.621	—	1
Delaware	18	11	.621	—	2
VCU	18	11	.621	—	3
UNC Wilmington	18	11	.621	—	4
George Mason	14	14	.500	3.5	5
Georgia State	15	15	.500	3.5	6
William & Mary	13	16	.448	5	—
Northeastern	12	17	.414	6	—
James Madison	11	17	.393	6.5	—
Towson	11	18	.379	7	—
Hofstra	11	18	.379	7	—

== Bracket and results ==
First round
1	Old Dominion	5
6	Georgia State	2
3	VCU	4
4	UNC Wilmington	3
2	Delaware	13
5	George Mason	3

Second round
1	Old Dominion	13
4	UNC Wilmington	3
3	VCU	10
2	Delaware	6
6	Georgia State	2
5	George Mason	10

Third round
1	Old Dominion	4
3	VCU	9
2	Delaware	6
5	George Mason	3

Semifinals
1	Old Dominion	0
2	Delaware	4

Final
3	VCU	10^{13}	—
2	Delaware	4	—

== All-Tournament Team ==
The following players were named to the All-Tournament Team.

Name	Team
Jared Bolden	VCU
Alex Buchholz	Delaware
Billy Harris	Delaware
Dan Hudson	Old Dominion
Ryan Jablonski	Delaware
John Leonard	VCU
Mick Mattaliano	VCU
Mike McGuire	Delaware
Sergio Miranda	VCU
Luke Pisker	VCU
Anthony Shawler	Old Dominion

=== Most Valuable Player ===
John Leonard was named Tournament Most Valuable Player. Leonard was a pitcher and outfielder for VCU.
