= 2003 Colonial Athletic Association baseball tournament =

American college baseball tournament

- Teams: 6
- Format: Double-elimination tournament
- Finals site: Coy Tillett Sr. Memorial Field; Manteo, North Carolina
- Champions: VCU (2nd title)
- Winning coach: Paul Keyes (2nd title)
- MVP: Matt Prendergast (VCU)

2003 Colonial Athletic Association baseball standings
	Conf.				Overall
Team	W		L	PCT	W		L	PCT
American Division
UNC Wilmington ^{x}‍‍‍^{y}	15	–	6	.714	40	–	23	.635
James Madison ‍‍‍	13	–	7	.650	29	–	27	.518
Towson ‍‍‍	11	–	9	.550	28	–	25	.528
Old Dominion ‍‍‍	5	–	15	.250	18	–	33	.353
Drexel ‍‍‍	3	–	17	.150	12	–	34	.261
Colonial Division
VCU ^{x}‍‍‡‍^{y}	17	–	3	.850	46	–	13	.780
William & Mary ‍‍‍	12	–	4	.750	31	–	20	.608
George Mason ‍‍‍	9	–	8	.529	31	–	20	.608
Delaware ‍‍‍	7	–	13	.350	21	–	32	.396
Hofstra ‍‍‍	5	–	15	.250	12	–	35	.255
x – Division champion ‡ – Tournament champion y – Invited to the NCAA tournament As of June 30, 2003; Rankings from Collegiate Baseball

The 2003 Colonial Athletic Association baseball tournament was held at Coy Tillett Sr. Memorial Field in Manteo, North Carolina, from May 21 through 25. The event determined the champion of the Colonial Athletic Association for the 2003 season. Top-seeded VCU won the tournament for the second time and earned the CAA's automatic bid to the 2003 NCAA Division I baseball tournament.

Entering the event, former member East Carolina had won the most championships, with seven. Among active members, Old Dominion led with three titles while George Mason had won twice and VCU and William & Mary had each won once.

== Format and seeding ==
The CAA's two division winners received the top two seeds. The next four teams, regardless of division, were selected and seeded by conference winning percentage. They played a double-elimination tournament.

American Division
Team	W	L	Pct.	GB	Seed
UNC Wilmington	15	6	.714	—	2
James Madison	13	7	.650	1.5	4
Towson	11	9	.550	3.5	5
Old Dominion	5	15	.250	9.5	—
Drexel	3	17	.150	11.5	—

Colonial Division
Team	W	L	Pct.	GB	Seed
VCU	17	3	.850	—	1
William & Mary	12	4	.750	2.5	3
George Mason	9	8	.529	6.5	6
Delaware	7	13	.350	10	—
Hofstra	5	15	.250	12	—

== Bracket and results ==
First round
1	VCU	6
6	George Mason	4
3	William & Mary	13
4	James Madison	12
2	UNC Wilmington	18
5	Towson	5

Second round
1	VCU	11
4	James Madison	3
3	William & Mary	3
2	UNC Wilmington	4^{12}
6	George Mason	25
5	Towson	10

Third round
1	VCU	13
2	UNC Wilmington	10
3	William & Mary	8
6	George Mason	14

Semifinals
2	UNC Wilmington	12
6	George Mason	13^{11}

Final
1	VCU	3	—
6	George Mason	0	—

== All-Tournament Team ==
The following players were named to the All-Tournament Team.

Name	Team
Michael Brown	William & Mary
Blake Cross	UNC Wilmington
Chip Grawey	UNC Wilmington
Jamie Hemingway	UNC Wilmington
Chris Looze	George Mason
Sean Marshall	VCU
Justin Mattison	VCU
Cla Meredith	VCU
Jeff Palumbo	George Mason
Jeff Parrish	VCU
Matt Prendergast	VCU
Nick Shimer	George Mason

=== Most Valuable Player ===
Matt Prendergast was named Tournament Most Valuable Player. Prendergast was a pitcher for VCU.
