= 2005 Colonial Athletic Association baseball tournament =

American college baseball tournament

- Teams: 6
- Format: Double-elimination tournament
- Finals site: Brooks Field; Wilmington, North Carolina
- Champions: VCU (3rd title)
- Winning coach: Paul Keyes (3rd title)
- MVP: Tim St. Clair (VCU)

2005 Colonial Athletic Association baseball standings
	Conf.				Overall
Team	W		L	PCT	W		L	PCT
UNC Wilmington ‍†‍‍	21	–	3	.875	40	–	19	.678
George Mason ‍‍‍	15	–	9	.625	35	–	19	.648
VCU ‍‍‡‍^{y}	14	–	10	.583	33	–	22	.600
Towson ‍‍‍	13	–	11	.542	34	–	24	.586
Delaware ‍‍‍	13	–	11	.542	27	–	31	.466
Hofstra ‍‍‍	10	–	14	.417	24	–	32	.429
William & Mary ‍‍‍	9	–	15	.375	27	–	27	.500
James Madison ‍‍‍	8	–	16	.333	20	–	35	.364
Old Dominion ‍‍‍	5	–	19	.208	22	–	33	.400
‡ – Tournament champion y – Invited to the NCAA tournament As of June 30, 2005; Rankings from Collegiate Baseball

The 2005 Colonial Athletic Association baseball tournament was held at Brooks Field in Wilmington, North Carolina, from May 26 through 29. The event determined the champion of the Colonial Athletic Association for the 2005 season. Third-seeded VCU won the tournament for the third time and earned the CAA's automatic bid to the 2005 NCAA Division I baseball tournament.

Entering the event, former member East Carolina had won the most championships, with seven. Among active members, Old Dominion led with three titles while George Mason and VCU had each won twice and UNC Wilmington and William & Mary had won once.

== Format and seeding ==
The top six teams from the CAA's round-robin regular season qualified for the tournament. Teams were seeded by conference winning percentage. They played a double-elimination tournament.

Team	W	L	Pct.	GB	Seed
UNC Wilmington	21	3	.875	—	1
George Mason	15	9	.625	6	2
VCU	14	10	.583	7	3
Towson	13	11	.542	8	4
Delaware	13	11	.542	8	5
Hofstra	10	14	.417	11	6
William & Mary	9	15	.375	12	—
James Madison	5	19	.208	16	—
Old Dominion	3	21	.125	17	—

== Bracket and results ==
First round
1	UNC Wilmington	9
6	Hofstra	6
3	VCU	6
4	Towson	5
2	George Mason	9
5	Delaware	5

Second round
1	UNC Wilmington	1
4	Towson	6
6	Hofstra	2
5	Delaware	13
3	VCU	8
2	George Mason	3
1	UNC Wilmington	7
2	George Mason	9

Third round
4	Towson	5
5	Delaware	0
3	VCU	5
2	George Mason	3

Final
4	Towson	6	—
3	VCU	13	—

== All-Tournament Team ==
The following players were named to the All-Tournament Team.

Name	Team
Jimmy Freund	George Mason
Alex Gary	VCU
Matt Holley	Towson
John Leonard	VCU
Mick Mattaliano	VCU
Harold Mozingo	VCU
Matt Poulk	UNC Wilmington
John Raynor	UNC Wilmington
Dan Richardson	Delaware
Casey Slattery	George Mason
Casper Wells	Towson

=== Most Valuable Player ===
Tim St. Clair was named Tournament Most Valuable Player. St. Clair was a first baseman and designated hitter for VCU.
