= Jim Sherman (baseball) =

American college baseball coach (born 1960)

Biographical details
- Born: January 26, 1960 (age 65); Wilmington, Delaware, U.S.

Playing career
- 1979–1982: Delaware
- 1982: Gulf Coast League Astros
- 1982–1983: Asheville Tourists
- 1983–1985: Columbus Astros
- 1984: Daytona Beach Astros
- 1986: Tucson Toros
- 1987: Boise Hawks
- Position: Outfielder / Third baseman

Coaching career (HC unless noted)
- 1988–1994: Wilmington
- 1995–2000: Delaware (asst.)
- 2001–2022: Delaware

Head coaching record
- Overall: 822–658
- Tournaments: CAA 23–20; NCAA: 1–4

Accomplishments and honors

Championships
- America East Champions (2001); America East Tournament champions (2001); CAA Champions (2007); CAA Tournament champions (2017)

Awards
- CAA Coach of the Year (2007)

James Herbert Sherman (born January 26, 1960) is an American baseball coach and former outfielder and third baseman. He played college baseball at Delaware for coach Bob Hannah from 1979 to 1982 and played in the Houston Astros organization for 6 seasons from 1982 to 1987. He then served as the head coach of the Wilmington Wildcats (1988–1994) and the Delaware Fightin' Blue Hens (2001–2022).

== Amateur career ==
Sherman attended William Penn High School in New Castle, Delaware. Sherman played for the school's varsity baseball and football teams. Sherman then enrolled at the University of Delaware, to play college baseball for the Delaware Fightin' Blue Hens baseball team.

As a freshman at the University of Delaware in 1979, Sherman had a .367 batting average, a .419 on-base percentage (OBP) and a .623 SLG. He was named to the first team All-East Coast Conference (ECC). As a sophomore in 1980, Sherman batted .328 with a .661 SLG, 13 home runs, and 56 RBIs. In the 1981 season as a junior, Sherman hit 10 home runs and 12 doubles, and was then selected by the Chicago Cubs in the 20th round of the 1981 Major League Baseball draft, but returned for his senior year at Delaware. Sherman had his best season as a senior in 1982, leading the team in doubles (13), home runs (15), RBIs (68), batting average (.394) and slugging (.794). He was named First Team All-ECC.

In 1980 and 1981 following his sophomore and junior seasons at Delaware, Sherman played collegiate summer baseball for the Chatham A's of the Cape Cod Baseball League (CCBL). Batting .339 and .335, he was named a league all-star in both seasons, and was inducted into the CCBL Hall of Fame in 2012.

== Professional career ==
Sherman was drafted in the 14th round of the 1982 Major League Baseball draft by the Houston Astros.

== Coaching career ==
Sherman was hired as the head coach of the Wilmington University Wildcats baseball program in 1988. He led the Wildcats to the NAIA World Series in 1992 and 1994. In the summer of 1994, Sherman was named an assistant coach at the University of Delaware. Sherman was elevated to head coach in 2000, following Bob Hannah's retirement. In May 2017, Sherman won his 500th career game at Delaware.

== Head coaching record ==
Statistics overview
| Season | Team | Overall | Conference | Standing | Postseason |
|---|---|---|---|---|---|
Wilmington Wildcats (Independent) (1988–1994)
| 1988 | Wilmington | 29–13 | | | |
| 1989 | Wilmington | 29–17 | | | |
| 1990 | Wilmington | 26–18 | | | |
| 1991 | Wilmington | 23–24 | | | |
| 1992 | Wilmington | 42–19 | | | NAIA World Series |
| 1993 | Wilmington | 36–13 | | | |
| 1994 | Wilmington | 33–24 | | | NAIA World Series |
| Wilmington: | | 218–128 | | | |
Delaware Fightin' Blue Hens (America East Conference) (2001)
| 2001 | Delaware | 45–15 | 22–6 | 1st | NCAA Regional |
Delaware Fightin' Blue Hens (Colonial Athletic Association) (2002–2022)
| 2002 | Delaware | 35–22 | 12–7 | 4th | CAA tournament |
| 2003 | Delaware | 21–32 | 7–13 | 4th | |
| 2004 | Delaware | 33–24 | 12–11 | 6th | CAA tournament |
| 2005 | Delaware | 27–31 | 13–11 | 5th | CAA tournament |
| 2006 | Delaware | 30–24 | 12–18 | 7th | |
| 2007 | Delaware | 32–23 | 18–11 | 1st | CAA tournament |
| 2008 | Delaware | 22–31 | 11–17 | 9th | |
| 2009 | Delaware | 28–20 | 11–10 | 6th | CAA tournament |
| 2010 | Delaware | 27–24 | 9–15 | 10th | |
| 2011 | Delaware | 27–26 | 16–14 | 5th | |
| 2012 | Delaware | 31–27 | 17–13 | 3rd | CAA tournament |
| 2013 | Delaware | 33–22 | 15–12 | 3rd | CAA tournament |
| 2014 | Delaware | 26–27 | 10–10 | 4th | CAA tournament |
| 2015 | Delaware | 26–24 | 11–13 | 5th | CAA tournament |
| 2016 | Delaware | 32–22 | 10–14 | 7th | |
| 2017 | Delaware | 34–23 | 15–8 | 4th | NCAA Regional |
| 2018 | Delaware | 29–25 | 12–11 | 5th | CAA tournament |
| 2019 | Delaware | 21–33 | 9–15 | 8th | |
| 2020 | Delaware | 8–7 | 0–0 | | Season canceled due to COVID-19 |
| 2021 | Delaware | 12–22 | 8–16 | T-3rd (North) | |
| 2022 | Delaware | 25–26 | 8-15 | 8th | |
| Delaware: | | 604–530 | 258–250 | | |
| Total: | | 822–658 | | | |
National champion Postseason invitational champion Conference regular season champion Conference regular season and conference tournament champion Division regular season champion Division regular season and conference tournament champion Conference tournament champion
