= 2002 Colonial Athletic Association baseball tournament =

American college baseball tournament

- Teams: 6
- Format: Double-elimination tournament
- Finals site: Coy Tillett Sr. Memorial Field; Manteo, North Carolina
- Champions: VCU (1st title)
- Winning coach: Paul Keyes (1st title)
- MVP: Brian Marshall (VCU)

2002 Colonial Athletic Association baseball standings
	Conf.						Overall
Team	W		L		T	PCT	W		L		T	PCT
American Division
James Madison ^{x}‍‍‍^{y}	15	–	5	–	0	.750	44	–	16	–	0	.733
UNC Wilmington ‍‍‍	14	–	7	–	0	.667	36	–	21	–	0	.632
Towson ‍‍‍	9	–	12	–	0	.429	23	–	27	–	1	.461
Old Dominion ‍‍‍	8	–	12	–	0	.400	26	–	17	–	0	.605
Drexel ‍‍‍	5	–	16	–	0	.238	21	–	34	–	0	.382
Colonial Division
William & Mary ^{x}‍‍‍	12	–	9	–	0	.571	32	–	26	–	0	.552
Delaware ‍‍‍	12	–	7	–	0	.632	35	–	22	–	0	.614
George Mason ‍‍‍	12	–	7	–	0	.632	28	–	29	–	0	.491
VCU ‍‍‡‍^{y}	13	–	8	–	0	.619	38	–	27	–	0	.585
Hofstra ‍‍‍	2	–	19	–	0	.095	12	–	40	–	0	.231
x – Division champion ‡ – Tournament champion y – Invited to the NCAA tournament As of June 30, 2002; Rankings from Collegiate Baseball

The 2002 Colonial Athletic Association baseball tournament was held at Coy Tillett Sr. Memorial Field in Manteo, North Carolina, from May 21 through 25. The event determined the champion of the Colonial Athletic Association for the 2002 season. Sixth-seeded VCU won the tournament for the first time and earned the CAA's automatic bid to the 2002 NCAA Division I baseball tournament. For the first time, the conference named an All-Tournament Team rather than simply a Most Outstanding Player.

Entering the event, former member East Carolina had won the most championships, with seven. Among active members, Old Dominion led with three titles while George Mason had won twice and William & Mary won once.

== Format and seeding ==
The CAA's two division winners received the top two seeds and a first round bye, as determined by division record. James Madison and William & Mary both finished with 9–3 records in their divisions. The next four teams, regardless of division, were selected and seeded by conference winning percentage. They played a double-elimination tournament. This resulted in William & Mary receiving a higher seed than three teams in their own division who finished with higher conference winning percentages.

American Division
	Div				Overall				
Team	W	L	Pct.	GB	W	L	Pct.	GB	Seed
James Madison	9	3	.750	—	15	5	.750	—	1
UNC Wilmington	8	4	.667	1	14	7	.667	1.5	3
Towson	6	6	.500	3	9	12	.429	6.5	—
Old Dominion	6	6	.500	3	8	12	.400	7	—
Drexel	1	11	.083	8	5	16	.238	10.5	—

Colonial Division
	Div				Overall				
Team	W	L	Pct.	GB	W	L	Pct.	GB	Seed
William & Mary	9	3	.750	—	12	9	.571	—	2
Delaware	7	4	.636	1.5	12	7	.632	+1	4
George Mason	7	4	.636	1.5	12	7	.632	+1	5
VCU	6	6	.500	3	13	8	.619	+1	6
Hofstra	0	12	.000	9	2	19	.095	—	

== Bracket and results ==
Upper round 1
4	Delaware	4
5	George Mason	1
3	UNC Wilmington	3
6	VCU	6
Lower round 1
5	George Mason	7^{12}
3	UNC Wilmington	6
4	Delaware	0
6	VCU	2

Upper round 2
1	James Madison	7
4	Delaware	3
2	William & Mary	1
6	VCU	0
Lower round 2
5	George Mason	10
6	VCU	13

Upper final
1	James Madison	6^{10}
2	William & Mary	2
Lower final
2	William & Mary	5
6	VCU	11

Final
1	James Madison	2
6	VCU	4

== All-Tournament Team ==
The following players were named to the All-Tournament Team.

Name	Team
Bo Acors	VCU
Travis Ebaugh	James Madison
Whitt Farr	William & Mary
Reid Gorecki	Delaware
Danny Lopaze	VCU
Brian Marshall	VCU
Davy Martin	VCU
Brent Metheny	James Madison
Jose Pabon	VCU
Jeff Palumbo	George Mason
Jeff Parrish	VCU

=== Most Valuable Player ===
Brian Marshall was named Tournament Most Valuable Player. Marshall was a pitcher for VCU.
