= 2003 NCAA Division I baseball season =

Baseball season

- Duration: January 16-June 23, 2003
- Number of teams: 287

Tournament
- Duration: May 30–June 23, 2003
- Most conference bids: SEC (8)

College World Series
- Duration: June 13–June 23, 2003
- Champions: Rice (1st title)
- Runners-up: Stanford (15th CWS Appearance)
- Winning coach: Wayne Graham (1st title)
- MOP: John Hudgins (Stanford)

Seasons
- ← 2002 2004 →

The 2003 NCAA Division I baseball season, play of college baseball in the United States organized by the National Collegiate Athletic Association (NCAA) at the Division I level, began on January 16, 2003. The season progressed through the regular season, many conference tournaments and championship series, and concluded with the 2003 NCAA Division I baseball tournament and 2003 College World Series. The College World Series, which consisted of the eight remaining teams in the NCAA tournament, was held in its annual location of Omaha, Nebraska, at Rosenblatt Stadium. It concluded on June 23, 2003, with the final game of the best-of-three championship series, the first such championship series used at the College World Series. Rice defeated Stanford two games to one to claim its first championship.

== Realignment ==
=== New programs ===
Three programs joined Division I prior to the 2003 season– Gardner-Webb, which had been a provisional member; Savannah State, which had been a Division II independent; and IPFW, which had been a provisional member.

=== Dropped programs ===
Howard dropped its baseball program following the 2002 season.

=== Conference changes ===
Sacramento State, which had been a member of the Big West Conference, became a Division I independent.

=== Conference formats ===
Bowling Green, which had played in the East Division of the Mid-American Conference, moved to the West Division.

== Conference standings ==
America East Conference
| | Conf | | | Overall | | |
| Team | W | L | Pct | W | L | Pct |
| Vermont | 17 | 5 | .773 | 32 | 14 | .697 |
| Maine | 17 | 7 | .708 | 38 | 14 | .731 |
| Stony Brook | 15 | 9 | .625 | 33 | 21 | .611 |
| Northeastern | 12 | 10 | .545 | 27 | 24 | .529 |
| Albany | 10 | 14 | .417 | 20 | 32 | .385 |
| Hartford | 7 | 15 | .318 | 9 | 34 | .209 |
| Binghamton | 2 | 20 | .091 | 10 | 40 | .200 |

Atlantic Coast Conference
| | Conf | | | Overall | | |
| Team | W | L | Pct | W | L | Pct |
| Florida State | 19 | 5 | .792 | 54 | 13 | .806 |
| Georgia Tech | 17 | 7 | .708 | 44 | 18 | .710 |
| North Carolina State | 15 | 9 | .625 | 45 | 16 | .738 |
| Clemson | 15 | 9 | .625 | 39 | 22 | .639 |
| North Carolina | 13 | 11 | .542 | 42 | 23 | .646 |
| Virginia | 11 | 12 | .478 | 29 | 25 | .537 |
| Wake Forest | 8 | 15 | .348 | 29 | 24 | .547 |
| Maryland | 6 | 17 | .261 | 20 | 33 | .377 |
| Duke | 2 | 21 | .087 | 18 | 36 | .333 |

Atlantic Sun Conference
| | Conf | | | Overall | | |
| Team | W | L | Pct | W | L | Pct |
| Florida Atlantic | 25 | 8 | .756 | 47 | 16 | .746 |
| Stetson | 21 | 12 | .636 | 41 | 24 | .631 |
| Jacksonville State | 19 | 14 | .576 | 32 | 26 | .610 |
| Belmont | 19 | 14 | .576 | 29 | 23 | .558 |
| Gardner–Webb | 18 | 15 | .545 | 33 | 23 | .589 |
| Jacksonville | 17 | 16 | .515 | 32 | 30 | .516 |
| Troy State | 16 | 17 | .485 | 27 | 27 | .500 |
| Georgia State | 16 | 17 | .485 | 25 | 29 | .463 |
| Central Florida | 14 | 16 | .467 | 31 | 25 | .554 |
| Campbell | 14 | 19 | .424 | 22 | 28 | .440 |
| Samford | 7 | 23 | .233 | 17 | 34 | .333 |
| Mercer | 6 | 21 | .222 | 11 | 34 | .244 |

Atlantic 10 Conference
| | Conf | | | Overall | | |
| Team | W | L | Pct | W | L | Pct |
East
| Massachusetts | 14 | 7 | .667 | 26 | 19 | .578 |
| Rhode Island | 16 | 8 | .667 | 26 | 26 | .500 |
| St. Bonaventure | 9 | 11 | .450 | 22 | 19 | .564 |
| Temple | 10 | 14 | .417 | 20 | 27 | .426 |
| Saint Joseph's | 10 | 14 | .417 | 17 | 31 | .354 |
| Fordham | 8 | 15 | .348 | 16 | 27 | .372 |
West
| Richmond | 19 | 4 | .826 | 48 | 15 | .762 |
| Duquesne | 15 | 9 | .625 | 25 | 29 | .463 |
| Xavier | 13 | 8 | .619 | 25 | 26 | .490 |
| George Washington | 12 | 9 | .571 | 37 | 18 | .673 |
| La Salle | 6 | 17 | .261 | 11 | 30 | .268 |
| Dayton | 4 | 20 | .167 | 16 | 36 | .333 |

Big East Conference
| | Conf | | | Overall | | |
| Team | W | L | Pct | W | L | Pct |
| Rutgers | 19 | 6 | .760 | 37 | 22 | .627 |
| West Virginia | 18 | 6 | .750 | 36 | 19 | .655 |
| Notre Dame | 16 | 7 | .696 | 45 | 18 | .714 |
| Virginia Tech | 15 | 10 | .600 | 34 | 23 | .596 |
| Boston College | 13 | 11 | .542 | 33 | 21 | .611 |
| Pittsburgh | 13 | 13 | .500 | 36 | 20 | .643 |
| St. John's | 12 | 14 | .462 | 29 | 27 | .518 |
| Seton Hall | 11 | 14 | .440 | 23 | 24 | .489 |
| Connecticut | 10 | 15 | .400 | 24 | 23 | .511 |
| Villanova | 6 | 19 | .240 | 14 | 32 | .304 |
| Georgetown | 4 | 22 | .154 | 14 | 33 | .298 |

Big South Conference
| | Conf | | | Overall | | |
| Team | W | L | Pct | W | L | Pct |
| Winthrop | 15 | 4 | .789 | 35 | 22 | .614 |
| Coastal Carolina | 12 | 7 | .632 | 45 | 18 | .714 |
| Elon | 12 | 7 | .632 | 34 | 23 | .596 |
| UNC Asheville | 12 | 9 | .571 | 27 | 28 | .491 |
| Charleston Southern | 9 | 12 | .429 | 19 | 37 | .339 |
| Liberty | 7 | 12 | .368 | 17 | 37 | .315 |
| High Point | 5 | 12 | .294 | 14 | 37 | .275 |
| Radford | 5 | 14 | .263 | 13 | 28 | .317 |

Big Ten Conference
| | Conf | | | Overall | | |
| Team | W | L | Pct | W | L | Pct |
| Minnesota | 24 | 6 | .800 | 40 | 22 | .645 |
| Ohio State | 20 | 12 | .625 | 44 | 19 | .698 |
| Michigan | 16 | 14 | .533 | 30 | 27 | .526 |
| Penn State | 17 | 15 | .531 | 29 | 28 | .509 |
| Northwestern | 15 | 14 | .517 | 25 | 25 | .500 |
| Indiana | 16 | 15 | .516 | 34 | 22 | .515 |
| Purdue | 13 | 18 | .419 | 29 | 26 | .527 |
| Illinois | 12 | 19 | .387 | 27 | 26 | .509 |
| Michigan State | 10 | 19 | .345 | 21 | 34 | .382 |
| Iowa | 10 | 21 | .323 | 18 | 29 | .383 |

Big 12 Conference
| | Conf | | | Overall | | |
| Team | W | L | Pct | W | L | Pct |
| Nebraska | 20 | 7 | .741 | 47 | 18 | .723 |
| Texas A&M | 19 | 8 | .704 | 45 | 19 | .703 |
| Texas | 19 | 8 | .704 | 50 | 20 | .714 |
| Missouri | 15 | 11 | .577 | 36 | 22 | .621 |
| Baylor | 15 | 12 | .556 | 45 | 23 | .662 |
| Oklahoma State | 14 | 13 | .519 | 34 | 24 | .586 |
| Oklahoma | 10 | 17 | .370 | 23 | 31 | .426 |
| Kansas | 9 | 18 | .333 | 35 | 28 | .556 |
| Texas Tech | 8 | 18 | .308 | 30 | 25 | .545 |
| Kansas State | 5 | 22 | .185 | 15 | 37 | .288 |

Big West Conference
| | Conf | | | Overall | | |
| Team | W | L | Pct | W | L | Pct |
| Long Beach State | 16 | 5 | .762 | 41 | 18 | .695 |
| Cal State Fullerton | 15 | 6 | .714 | 50 | 16 | .758 |
| UC Riverside | 14 | 7 | .667 | 41 | 17 | .707 |
| Cal Poly | 9 | 12 | .429 | 27 | 28 | .491 |
| Cal State Northridge | 8 | 13 | .381 | 14 | 42 | .250 |
| UC Irvine | 8 | 13 | .381 | 21 | 35 | .375 |
| UC Santa Barbara | 8 | 13 | .381 | 25 | 28 | .472 |
| Pacific | 6 | 15 | .286 | 27 | 27 | .500 |

Colonial Athletic Association
| | Conf | | | Overall | | |
| Team | W | L | Pct | W | L | Pct |
American
| UNC Wilmington | 15 | 6 | .714 | 40 | 23 | .635 |
| James Madison | 13 | 7 | .650 | 29 | 27 | .518 |
| Towson | 11 | 9 | .550 | 28 | 25 | .528 |
| Old Dominion | 5 | 15 | .250 | 18 | 33 | .353 |
| Drexel | 3 | 17 | .150 | 12 | 34 | .261 |
Colonial
| Virginia Commonwealth | 17 | 3 | .850 | 46 | 13 | .780 |
| William & Mary | 12 | 4 | .750 | 31 | 20 | .608 |
| George Mason | 9 | 8 | .529 | 31 | 20 | .608 |
| Delaware | 7 | 13 | .350 | 21 | 32 | .396 |
| Hofstra | 5 | 15 | .250 | 12 | 35 | .255 |

Conference USA
| | Conf | | | Overall | | |
| Team | W | L | Pct | W | L | Pct |
| Southern Miss | 23 | 7 | .767 | 47 | 16 | .746 |
| Texas Christian | 22 | 8 | .733 | 35 | 22 | .614 |
| Tulane | 20 | 10 | .667 | 44 | 19 | .698 |
| Houston | 18 | 12 | .600 | 37 | 30 | .552 |
| East Carolina | 17 | 13 | .567 | 34 | 27 | .557 |
| South Florida | 14 | 14 | .500 | 31 | 27 | .534 |
| Louisville | 14 | 15 | .483 | 34 | 23 | .596 |
| Charlotte | 11 | 15 | .423 | 21 | 28 | .429 |
| UAB | 12 | 17 | .414 | 27 | 26 | .509 |
| Memphis | 11 | 18 | .379 | 21 | 33 | .389 |
| Cincinnati | 7 | 22 | .241 | 15 | 39 | .278 |
| Saint Louis | 6 | 24 | .200 | 18 | 32 | .360 |

Horizon League
| | Conf | | | Overall | | |
| Team | W | L | Pct | W | L | Pct |
| Illinois–Chicago | 15 | 6 | .714 | 39 | 18 | .684 |
| Butler | 16 | 8 | .667 | 34 | 27 | .557 |
| Wisconsin–Milwaukee | 13 | 10 | .565 | 25 | 25 | .500 |
| Youngstown State | 12 | 11 | .522 | 27 | 28 | .491 |
| Wright State | 10 | 13 | .435 | 21 | 34 | .382 |
| Detroit | 8 | 12 | .400 | 15 | 32 | .319 |
| Cleveland State | 4 | 18 | .182 | 13 | 39 | .250 |

Ivy League
| | Conf | | | | Overall | |
| Team | W | L | Pct | W | L | Pct |
Lou Gehrig
| Princeton | 15 | 5 | .750 | 27 | 23 | .540 |
| Penn | 12 | 8 | .600 | 22 | 17 | .564 |
| Cornell | 9 | 11 | .450 | 16 | 20 | .444 |
| Columbia | 9 | 11 | .450 | 21 | 27 | .438 |
Red Rolfe
| Harvard | 11 | 9 | .550 | 20 | 23 | .465 |
| Dartmouth | 10 | 10 | .500 | 17 | 19 | .472 |
| Brown | 8 | 12 | .400 | 18 | 28 | .391 |
| Yale | 6 | 14 | .300 | 16 | 24 | .400 |

Metro Atlantic Athletic Conference
| | Conf | | | Overall | | |
| Team | W | L | Pct | W | L | Pct |
| Le Moyne | 22 | 3 | .880 | 33 | 17 | .660 |
| Marist | 19 | 8 | .704 | 33 | 20 | .623 |
| Niagara | 16 | 10 | .615 | 26 | 25 | .510 |
| Manhattan | 15 | 10 | .600 | 26 | 36 | .419 |
| Iona | 15 | 11 | .577 | 21 | 24 | .467 |
| Siena | 15 | 11 | .577 | 17 | 35 | .327 |
| Rider | 14 | 13 | .519 | 22 | 37 | .373 |
| Saint Peter's | 6 | 20 | .231 | 7 | 33 | .175 |
| Fairfield | 5 | 21 | .192 | 7 | 34 | .171 |
| Canisius | 3 | 23 | .115 | 4 | 38 | .095 |

Mid-American Conference
| | Conf | | | Overall | | |
| Team | W | L | Pct | W | L | Pct |
East
| Kent State | 20 | 4 | .833 | 36 | 18 | .667 |
| Miami (OH) | 19 | 9 | .679 | 36 | 24 | .600 |
| Ohio | 15 | 11 | .577 | 35 | 23 | .603 |
| Akron | 12 | 15 | .444 | 22 | 30 | .423 |
| Marshall | 11 | 16 | .407 | 22 | 31 | .415 |
| Buffalo | 5 | 21 | .192 | 16 | 37 | .302 |
West
| Ball State | 17 | 10 | .630 | 36 | 21 | .632 |
| Eastern Michigan | 16 | 11 | .593 | 33 | 28 | .541 |
| Northern Illinois | 15 | 11 | .577 | 34 | 24 | .586 |
| Western Michigan | 16 | 12 | .571 | 25 | 26 | .490 |
| Central Michigan | 9 | 15 | .375 | 25 | 28 | .472 |
| Bowling Green | 9 | 18 | .333 | 17 | 28 | .378 |
| Toledo | 8 | 19 | .296 | 22 | 29 | .431 |

Mid-Continent Conference
| | Conf | | | Overall | | |
| Team | W | L | Pct | W | L | Pct |
| Oral Roberts | 19 | 1 | .950 | 41 | 20 | .672 |
| Southern Utah | 11 | 9 | .550 | 21 | 29 | .420 |
| Western Illinois | 10 | 10 | .500 | 25 | 38 | .397 |
| Valparaiso | 9 | 11 | .450 | 22 | 33 | .400 |
| Oakland | 7 | 13 | .350 | 20 | 34 | .370 |
| Chicago State | 4 | 16 | .200 | 9 | 47 | .161 |

Mid-Eastern Athletic Conference
| | Conf | | | Overall | | |
| Team | W | L | Pct | W | L | Pct |
North
| Delaware State | 9 | 0 | 1.000 | 27 | 25 | .519 |
| Coppin State | 7 | 4 | .636 | 12 | 27 | .308 |
| Maryland–Eastern Shore | 1 | 13 | .071 | 5 | 33 | .132 |
South
| Bethune–Cookman | 11 | 5 | .688 | 30 | 28 | .517 |
| Florida A&M | 12 | 6 | .667 | 29 | 21 | .580 |
| North Carolina A&T | 6 | 10 | .375 | 13 | 36 | .265 |
| Norfolk State | 5 | 13 | .278 | 18 | 28 | .391 |

Missouri Valley Conference
| | Conf | | | Overall | | |
| Team | W | L | Pct | W | L | Pct |
| Southwest Missouri State | 19 | 11 | .633 | 40 | 26 | .606 |
| Wichita State | 19 | 13 | .594 | 49 | 27 | .645 |
| Southern Illinois | 17 | 13 | .567 | 30 | 25 | .545 |
| Northern Iowa | 16 | 15 | .516 | 27 | 28 | .491 |
| Indiana State | 15 | 17 | .469 | 36 | 22 | .621 |
| Creighton | 14 | 17 | .452 | 20 | 37 | .351 |
| Illinois State | 14 | 17 | .452 | 23 | 29 | .442 |
| Bradley | 12 | 17 | .414 | 23 | 30 | .434 |
| Evansville | 12 | 20 | .375 | 24 | 31 | .436 |

Mountain West Conference
| | Conf | | | Overall | | |
| Team | W | L | Pct | W | L | Pct |
| UNLV | 24 | 6 | .800 | 47 | 17 | .734 |
| San Diego State | 18 | 12 | .600 | 29 | 32 | .475 |
| BYU | 18 | 12 | .600 | 30 | 24 | .556 |
| New Mexico | 17 | 13 | .567 | 34 | 26 | .567 |
| Utah | 10 | 20 | .333 | 24 | 32 | .429 |
| Air Force | 3 | 27 | .100 | 15 | 39 | .278 |

Northeast Conference
| | Conf | | | Overall | | |
| Team | W | L | Pct | W | L | Pct |
| Central Connecticut | 19 | 6 | .360 | 31 | 17 | .646 |
| St. Francis (NY) | 17 | 10 | .630 | 21 | 21 | .500 |
| Monmouth | 15 | 11 | .577 | 24 | 27 | .471 |
| UMBC | 15 | 12 | .556 | 20 | 27 | .426 |
| Quinnipiac | 14 | 13 | .519 | 17 | 24 | .415 |
| Fairleigh Dickinson | 12 | 15 | .444 | 14 | 25 | .359 |
| Long Island | 11 | 15 | .423 | 16 | 24 | .400 |
| Mount St. Mary's | 9 | 14 | .391 | 14 | 23 | .378 |
| Wagner | 10 | 16 | .385 | 11 | 36 | .234 |
| Sacred Heart | 7 | 17 | .292 | 13 | 29 | .310 |

Ohio Valley Conference
| | Conf | | | Overall | | |
| Team | W | L | Pct | W | L | Pct |
| Austin Peay | 14 | 5 | .737 | 27 | 27 | .500 |
| Southeast Missouri State | 14 | 6 | .700 | 31 | 20 | .608 |
| Tennessee Tech | 13 | 6 | .684 | 27 | 25 | .519 |
| Murray State | 9 | 11 | .450 | 25 | 31 | .446 |
| Eastern Kentucky | 8 | 11 | .421 | 24 | 29 | .453 |
| Eastern Illinois | 8 | 12 | .400 | 26 | 31 | .456 |
| Tennessee–Martin | 6 | 13 | .316 | 17 | 30 | .362 |
| Morehead State | 6 | 14 | .300 | 16 | 33 | .327 |

Pacific-10 Conference
| | Conf | | | Overall | | |
| Team | W | L | Pct | W | L | Pct |
| Stanford | 18 | 6 | .750 | 51 | 18 | .739 |
| Arizona State | 16 | 8 | .667 | 53 | 12 | .815 |
| Washington | 15 | 9 | .625 | 42 | 18 | .700 |
| Arizona | 13 | 11 | .542 | 35 | 23 | .603 |
| USC | 11 | 13 | .458 | 28 | 28 | .500 |
| UCLA | 11 | 13 | .458 | 28 | 31 | .475 |
| California | 10 | 14 | .417 | 28 | 27 | .509 |
| Washington State | 7 | 17 | .292 | 19 | 37 | .339 |
| Oregon State | 7 | 17 | .292 | 25 | 28 | .472 |

Patriot League
| | Conf | | | Overall | | |
| Team | W | L | Pct | W | L | Pct |
| Bucknell | 15 | 5 | .750 | 27 | 16 | .628 |
| Navy | 12 | 8 | .600 | 21 | 24 | .467 |
| Lehigh | 9 | 11 | .450 | 19 | 23 | .452 |
| Army | 9 | 11 | .450 | 17 | 25 | .405 |
| Holy Cross | 8 | 12 | .400 | 13 | 23 | .361 |
| Lafayette | 7 | 13 | .350 | 16 | 24 | .400 |

Southeastern Conference
| Team | W | L | Pct | W | L | Pct |
East
| South Carolina | 19 | 11 | .633 | 42 | 20 | .677 |
| Vanderbilt | 14 | 16 | .467 | 27 | 28 | .491 |
| Florida | 13 | 16 | .448 | 37 | 21 | .638 |
| Tennessee | 13 | 17 | .433 | 31 | 24 | .564 |
| Georgia | 10 | 20 | .333 | 29 | 26 | .527 |
| Kentucky | 9 | 20 | .310 | 24 | 32 | .429 |
West
| LSU | 20 | 9 | .690 | 45 | 22 | .672 |
| Auburn | 18 | 12 | .600 | 42 | 21 | .667 |
| Mississippi State | 17 | 12 | .586 | 42 | 20 | .677 |
| Ole Miss | 17 | 13 | .567 | 35 | 27 | .565 |
| Alabama | 14 | 16 | .467 | 38 | 24 | .613 |
| Arkansas | 14 | 16 | .467 | 35 | 22 | .614 |

Southern Conference
| | Conf | | | Overall | | |
| Team | W | L | Pct | W | L | Pct |
| Western Carolina | 22 | 8 | .733 | 43 | 21 | .672 |
| Georgia Southern | 19 | 10 | .655 | 39 | 21 | .650 |
| The Citadel | 19 | 11 | .633 | 32 | 25 | .561 |
| UNC Greensboro | 17 | 13 | .567 | 39 | 21 | .650 |
| Furman | 17 | 13 | .567 | 32 | 24 | .571 |
| College of Charleston | 17 | 13 | .567 | 31 | 27 | .534 |
| VMI | 16 | 14 | .533 | 24 | 28 | .462 |
| Davidson | 12 | 17 | .414 | 18 | 27 | .400 |
| East Tennessee State | 9 | 20 | .310 | 15 | 36 | .294 |
| Appalachian State | 8 | 22 | .267 | 14 | 36 | .280 |
| Wofford | 7 | 22 | .241 | 9 | 40 | .184 |

Southland Conference
| | Conf | | | Overall | | |
| Team | W | L | Pct | W | L | Pct |
| Lamar | 20 | 6 | .769 | 40 | 18 | .690 |
| Southwest Texas State | 19 | 7 | .731 | 30 | 28 | .517 |
| Texas–Arlington | 18 | 9 | .667 | 37 | 25 | .597 |
| Northwestern State | 16 | 11 | .593 | 35 | 22 | .561 |
| Louisiana–Monroe | 12 | 14 | .462 | 29 | 28 | .509 |
| McNeese State | 12 | 15 | .444 | 31 | 30 | .508 |
| Texas–San Antonio | 12 | 15 | .444 | 29 | 27 | .518 |
| Sam Houston State | 9 | 18 | .333 | 20 | 33 | .377 |
| Southeastern Louisiana | 8 | 18 | .308 | 18 | 35 | .340 |
| Nicholls State | 7 | 20 | .259 | 22 | 32 | .407 |

Southwestern Athletic Conference
| | Conf | | | Overall | | |
| Team | W | L | Pct | W | L | Pct |
East
| Mississippi Valley State | 22 | 6 | .786 | 29 | 29 | .500 |
| Jackson State | 18 | 12 | .600 | 20 | 20 | .500 |
| Alcorn State | 14 | 18 | .438 | 20 | 28 | .417 |
| Alabama A&M | 13 | 18 | .419 | 15 | 32 | .319 |
| Alabama State | 8 | 21 | .276 | 11 | 28 | .282 |
West
| Southern | 31 | 1 | .969 | 44 | 7 | .863 |
| Texas Southern | 19 | 13 | .594 | 22 | 30 | .423 |
| Grambling State | 16 | 16 | .500 | 22 | 25 | .468 |
| Prairie View A&M | 7 | 23 | .233 | 10 | 45 | .182 |
| Arkansas Pine–Bluff | 5 | 25 | .167 | 12 | 38 | .240 |

Sun Belt Conference
| | Conf | | | Overall | | |
| Team | W | L | Pct | W | L | Pct |
| South Alabama | 17 | 7 | .708 | 42 | 19 | .689 |
| New Mexico State | 15 | 9 | .625 | 43 | 18 | .705 |
| Louisiana–Lafayette | 15 | 9 | .625 | 30 | 30 | .500 |
| Western Kentucky | 12 | 11 | .522 | 34 | 22 | .515 |
| Florida International | 12 | 12 | .500 | 36 | 23 | .610 |
| Middle Tennessee | 10 | 13 | .435 | 33 | 27 | .550 |
| Arkansas–Little Rock | 9 | 14 | .391 | 30 | 26 | .536 |
| Arkansas State | 9 | 14 | .391 | 24 | 31 | .436 |
| New Orleans | 7 | 17 | .292 | 23 | 32 | .418 |

West Coast Conference
| | Conf | | | Overall | | |
| Team | W | L | Pct | W | L | Pct |
Coast
| Pepperdine | 23 | 7 | .767 | 36 | 25 | .590 |
| Santa Clara | 21 | 9 | .700 | 31 | 26 | .544 |
| Gonzaga | 14 | 16 | .467 | 26 | 25 | .510 |
| Saint Mary's | 8 | 21 | .276 | 18 | 37 | .327 |
West
| San Diego | 18 | 12 | .600 | 32 | 30 | .516 |
| San Francisco | 17 | 13 | .567 | 25 | 31 | .446 |
| Loyola Marymount | 13 | 17 | .433 | 26 | 30 | .464 |
| Portland | 5 | 24 | .172 | 9 | 45 | .167 |

Western Athletic Conference
| | Conf | | | Overall | | |
| Team | W | L | Pct | W | L | Pct |
| Rice | 25 | 5 | .833 | 58 | 12 | .829 |
| Nevada | 19 | 10 | .655 | 32 | 24 | .571 |
| Fresno State | 14 | 16 | .467 | 30 | 29 | .508 |
| Hawaii | 11 | 19 | .367 | 30 | 26 | .536 |
| San Jose State | 10 | 19 | .385 | 25 | 32 | .439 |
| Louisiana Tech | 10 | 20 | .333 | 18 | 34 | .346 |

Division I Independents
| Team | W | L | Pct |
| Miami (FL) | 42 | 15 | .737 |
| Savannah State | 34 | 15 | .694 |
| Texas A&M–Corpus Christi | 33 | 17 | .660 |
| Birmingham–Southern | 33 | 18 | .647 |
| Sacramento State | 33 | 24 | .579 |
| Centenary | 23 | 33 | .411 |
| Texas–Pan American | 21 | 33 | .389 |
| Lipscomb | 16 | 31 | .340 |
| IPFW | 17 | 33 | .340 |
| NYIT | 15 | 32 | .319 |
| Morris Brown | 10 | 33 | .233 |
| Hawaii–Hilo | 9 | 38 | .191 |
| Pace | 9 | 39 | .188 |

Team won the conference tournament and the automatic bid to the NCAA tournament
Conference does not have conference tournament, so team won the autobid for finishing in first
Team received at-large bid to NCAA tournament

== College World Series ==
The 2003 season marked the fifty seventh NCAA baseball tournament, which culminated with the eight team College World Series. The College World Series was held in Omaha, Nebraska. The eight teams played a double-elimination format, with Rice claiming their first championship with a two games to one series win over Stanford in the final.

=== Bracket ===
First round
Texas | 13
8 | Miami (FL) | 2
5 | Rice | 4
Southwest Missouri State | 2
8 | Miami (FL) | 7
Southwest Missouri State | 5
2 | LSU | 2
7 | Cal State Fullerton | 8
6 | Stanford | 8
South Carolina | 0
2 | LSU | 10
South Carolina | 11

Second round
Texas | 2
5 | Rice | 12
8 | Miami (FL) | 1
Texas | 5
7 | Cal State Fullerton | 6
6 | Stanford | 5
South Carolina | 6
6 | Stanford | 13

Semifinals
5 | Rice | 5 | —
Texas | 4 | —
7 | Cal State Fullerton | 3 | 5*
6 | Stanford | 5 | 7*

Finals
5 | Rice | 4^{10} | 3 | 14
6 | Stanford | 3 | 8 | 2
