= 2015 Colonial Athletic Association baseball tournament =

American college baseball tournament

- Teams: 6
- Format: Double-elimination tournament
- Finals site: CofC Baseball Stadium at Patriot's Point; Mount Pleasant, South Carolina
- Champions: UNC Wilmington (4th title)
- Winning coach: Mark Scalf (3rd title)
- MVP: Corey Dick (UNC Wilmington)

2015 Colonial Athletic Association baseball standings
	Conf.						Overall
Team	W		L		T	PCT	W		L		T	PCT
No. 28 College of Charleston ‍†‍‍^{y}	21	–	3	–	0	.875	45	–	15	–	0	.750
UNC Wilmington ‍‍‡‍^{y}	18	–	6	–	0	.750	41	–	18	–	0	.695
Northeastern ‍‍‍	14	–	10	–	0	.583	25	–	30	–	0	.455
Elon ‍‍‍	13	–	11	–	0	.542	25	–	29	–	0	.463
Delaware ‍‍‍	11	–	13	–	0	.458	26	–	24	–	0	.520
William & Mary ‍‍‍	10	–	14	–	0	.417	22	–	30	–	0	.423
Towson ‍‍‍	9	–	15	–	0	.375	17	–	35	–	2	.333
Hofstra ‍‍‍	6	–	18	–	0	.250	19	–	29	–	0	.396
James Madison ‍‍‍	6	–	18	–	0	.250	18	–	33	–	0	.353
† – Conference champion ‡ – Tournament champion y – Invited to the NCAA tournament As of June 30, 2015; Rankings from Collegiate Baseball

The 2015 Colonial Athletic Association baseball tournament was held at CofC Baseball Stadium at Patriot's Point in Mount Pleasant, South Carolina, from May 20 through 23. It consisted of the top 6 finishers in the CAA in a double-elimination tournament. UNC Wilmington won their 4th championship and earned the Colonial Athletic Association's automatic bid to the 2015 NCAA Division I baseball tournament.

Entering the event, UNC Wilmington had won the most championships among active teams, with three. James Madison had claimed two titles, while William & Mary, Towson, and second-year member College of Charleston each had one. Former member East Carolina won 7 titles during their tenure in the conference.

== Seeding and format ==
Continuing the format adopted in 2012, the top six finishers from the regular season will compete in the double-elimination tournament. The top two teams received a single bye and played the winners of the opening round games.

Team	W	L	Pct.	GB	Seed
College of Charleston	21	3	.875	—	1
UNC Wilmington	18	6	.750	3	2
Northeastern	14	10	.583	7	3
Elon	13	11	.542	8	4
Delaware	11	13	.458	10	5
William & Mary	10	14	.417	11	6
Towson	9	15	.375	12	—
Hofstra	6	18	.250	15	—
James Madison	6	18	.250	15	—

== Bracket ==
Upper round 1	Upper round 2	Upper final	Final
1	College of Charleston	9
4	Elon	7	4	Elon	0
5	Delaware	6	1	College of Charleston	3
2	UNC Wilmington	4^{10}
2	UNC Wilmington	16
3	Northeastern	3	3	Northeastern	7
6	William & Mary	2
2	UNC Wilmington	7	–
1	College of Charleston	6	–
Lower round 1	Lower round 2	Lower round 3	Lower final
5	Delaware	1
3	Northeastern	3	1	College of Charleston	4
5	Delaware	4	5	Delaware	7
5	Delaware	3	4	Elon	1
6	William & Mary	1

== All-Tournament team ==
The following players were named to the All-Tournament Team.

Player	School
Ryan Brown	College of Charleston
Taylor Clarke	College of Charleston
Adam Davis	Delaware
Corey Dick	UNC Wilmington
Luke Dunlap	UNC Wilmington
Cam Hanley	Northeastern
Hayden McCutcheon	College of Charleston
Kennard McDowell	UNC Wilmington
Brock Niggebrugge	Delaware
Evan Phillips	UNC Wilmington
Jordan Ramsey	UNC Wilmington
Gavin Stupienski	UNC Wilmington

=== Most Valuable Player ===
Corey Dick was named Tournament Most Valuable Player. Dick was a first baseman for UNC Wilmington, who went 3 for 5 in the Championship Game with a pair of doubles and two RBI.
