= 1995 Colonial Athletic Association baseball tournament =

American college baseball tournament

- Teams: 7
- Format: Double-elimination tournament
- Finals site: Grainger Stadium; Kinston, North Carolina
- Champions: Old Dominion (2nd title)
- Winning coach: Tony Guzzo (1st title)
- MVP: Lyle Hartgrove (Old Dominion)

1995 Colonial Athletic Association baseball standings
	Conf.				Overall
Team	W		L	PCT	W		L	PCT
James Madison ‍†‍‍^{y}	14	–	4	.778	42	–	17	.712
UNC Wilmington ‍‍‍	11	–	7	.611	30	–	25	.545
Richmond ‍‍‍^{y}	11	–	7	.611	43	–	17	.717
George Mason ‍‍‍	11	–	7	.611	31	–	25	.554
No. 30 Old Dominion ‍‍‡‍^{y}	9	–	9	.500	39	–	20	.661
East Carolina ‍‍‍	5	–	13	.278	29	–	26	.527
William & Mary ‍‍‍	2	–	16	.111	24	–	29	.453
† – Conference champion ‡ – Tournament champion y – Invited to the NCAA tournament As of June 30, 1995; Rankings from Collegiate Baseball

The 1995 Colonial Athletic Association baseball tournament was held at Grainger Stadium in Kinston, North Carolina, from May 17 through 21. The event determined the champion of the Colonial Athletic Association for the 1995 season. Defending champion and fifth-seeded Old Dominion won the tournament for the second time and earned the CAA's automatic bid to the 1995 NCAA Division I baseball tournament.

Entering the event, East Carolina had won the most championships, with five. George Mason had won two, while Richmond and Old Dominion had each won once.

== Format and seeding ==
The CAA's seven teams were seeded one to seven based on winning percentage from the conference's round robin regular season. They played a double-elimination tournament.

Team	W	L	Pct.	GB	Seed
James Madison	14	4	.778	—	1
UNC Wilmington	11	7	.611	3	2
Richmond	11	7	.611	3	3
George Mason	11	7	.611	3	4
Old Dominion	9	9	.500	5	5
East Carolina	5	13	.278	9	6
William & Mary	2	16	.111	12	7

== Bracket and results ==
Upper round 1
4	George Mason	11
5	Old Dominion	6
3	Richmond	10
6	East Carolina	3
2	UNC Wilmington	6
7	William & Mary	1

Upper round 2
1	James Madison	5
4	George Mason	9
3	Richmond	17
2	UNC Wilmington	2
Lower round 1
7	William & Mary	8
6	East Carolina	7

Upper final
4	George Mason	9
3	Richmond	10
Lower round 2
1	James Madison	5
7	William & Mary	2
5	Old Dominion	5
2	UNC Wilmington	2

Semifinals
3	Richmond	0
5	Old Dominion	11
4	George Mason	2
1	James Madison	4

Preliminary final
5	Old Dominion	8
4	George Mason	5

Final
3	Richmond	7
5	Old Dominion	15

== Most Valuable Player ==
Maika Symmonds was named Tournament Most Valuable Player. Symmonds was an outfielder and pitcher for Old Dominion.
