= CAA Tournament =

CAA Tournament may refer to the championship of any sport sponsored by the Colonial Athletic Association, including the following:

- Colonial Athletic Association men's basketball tournament
- Colonial Athletic Association baseball tournament
- Colonial Athletic Association women's basketball tournament
