= Long Field at Mauck Stadium =

Baseball venue in Harrisonburg, Virginia

- Interactive map of Long Field at Mauck Stadium
- Full name: J. Ward Long Baseball Field at Mauck Stadium
- Location: Harrisonburg, VA
- Coordinates: 38.436496°N 78.865246°W
- Capacity: 1,200

Construction
- Built: 1974
- Expanded: 1978
- Closed: 2009

Tenants
- James Madison Dukes baseball (NCAA D1 CAA) (1974–2009); Harrisonburg Turks (VBL) (2009)

Long Field at Mauck Stadium is a baseball venue located on the campus of James Madison University in Harrisonburg, Virginia, United States. It was home to the James Madison Dukes baseball team, a member of the Division I Colonial Athletic Association until the end of the 2009 season, when it was replaced by Eagle Field at Veterans Memorial Park. Built in 1974, The venue has a capacity of 1,200.

Long Field is named after J. Ward Long, a former professor at the university who also coached the golf, basketball, and cross county teams. Mauck Stadium is named in honor of J. Leonard Mauck, a former board member at James Madison.

== History ==
The Long Field portion of the facility was constructed in 1974, with the Mauck Stadium portion being completed in 1978.

On May 16, 2009, the field hosted its final James Madison game before closing. In the game, James Madison defeated No. 27 George Mason 9–6. Eagle Field at Veterans Memorial Park replaced Mauck Stadium as the home field of the program. In the summer of 2009, the Harrisonburg Turks of the collegiate summer Valley Baseball League used the facility, as their former facility at Veterans Memorial Park was undergoing construction to become James Madison's new venue, Eagle Field at Veterans Memorial Park.
