= Spanky McFarland (disambiguation) =

Spanky McFarland (1928–1993) was an American actor, member of Our Gang.

Spanky McFarland may also refer to:

- Elaine "Spanky" McFarlane, lead singer of the band Spanky and Our Gang
- Spanky McFarland (baseball) (born 1954), American college baseball coach at James Madison University
