= Spanky McFarland (baseball) =

American college baseball coach (born 1954)

Biographical details
- Born: May 24, 1954 (age 72); New Carlisle, Ohio, U.S.
- Education: Hillsdale (B.A., 1976); Appalachian State (M.A., 1981)

Playing career

Football
- 1972–1975: Hillsdale

Baseball
- 1973–1976: Hillsdale

Coaching career (HC unless noted)

Baseball
- 1977: Hillsdale (assistant)
- 1979–1980: Kellogg CC
- 1981: Appalachian State (assistant)
- 1982: Florida State (assistant)
- 1983–1985: Georgia Tech (assistant)
- 1986–1990: South Florida (assistant)
- 1991–1997: Northern Illinois
- 1998–2015: James Madison

Head coaching record
- Overall: 667–684–4 (college); 33–13 (junior college)
- Tournaments: 4–6 (NCAA Division I); 7–5 (Horizon); 22–20 (CAA)

Accomplishments and honors

Championships
- 1 Horizon tournament (1996); 3 CAA regular season (2006, 2010, 2011); 2 CAA tournament (2008, 2011); 1 CAA American Division (2002)

Awards
- 2× CAA Coach of the Year (2002, 2010); 4× Louisville Slugger Conference Coach of the Year (2002, 2006, 2010, 2011); ABCA East Region Coach of the Year (2011); Virginia SID Coach of the Year (2008); Middle Atlantic Baseball Scouts Association Coach of the Year (2008); Springfield-Clark County Baseball Hall of Fame

Joe "Spanky" McFarland (born May 24, 1954) is an American former college baseball coach who was the head coach of Northern Illinois (1991–1997) and James Madison (1998–2015). Under him, JMU appeared in three NCAA tournaments. A 1976 graduate of Hillsdale College, McFarland served as an assistant coach at several schools in the late 1970s and 1980s.

== Playing career ==
A native of New Carlisle, Ohio, McFarland attended Tecumseh High School, where he played football, basketball, and baseball. He then played football and baseball at Michigan's Hillsdale College. After graduating in spring 1976, he spent training camp with the Canadian Football League's Calgary Stampeders before starting his coaching career the following year.

== Coaching career ==
=== Junior college and assistant coaching ===
McFarland's first coaching position was an assistant job at Hillsdale in 1977. He next served as the head coach at Kellogg Community College, also in Michigan, from 1979 to 1980. His overall record at Kellogg was 33-13. McFarland then spent a decade as an assistant in the southeast, coaching at Appalachian State (1981), Florida State (1982), Georgia Tech (1983–1985), and South Florida (1986–1990).

=== Northern Illinois ===
McFarland's first Division I head coaching job came at Northern Illinois (NIU) from 1991 to 1997. There, McFarland revived a program that had been cut in the early 1980s. He had a 146-211 record in seven seasons.

After playing 1991 as an independent, NIU played in the Mid-Continent Conference from 1992 to 1994. The team finished in the bottom three of the conference in all three seasons, with its highest win total coming in 1994 (23-30). From 1995 to 1997, it played in the Horizon League and qualified for the conference tournament in each season. In 1995, it had its first above-.500 season under McFarland (29-27), finished second in the West Division, and placed third in the Horizon Tournament. The Huskies' Jesse Richardson was named the Horizon Player of the Year. In 1996, it won the Horizon Tournament but lost to Northeastern Illinois in the NCAA tournament play-in game.

At NIU, four of McFarland's players were selected in the MLB draft, including 7th-round selection Chris Burt in 1994. Another of his players, Brian Schmack, went undrafted but later pitched in Major League Baseball for the Detroit Tigers.

=== James Madison ===
After the 1997 season, McFarland left Northern Illinois to become the head coach at James Madison. He replaced Kevin Anderson, who had resigned following allegations that he overstated spending on team meals.

The Dukes' first winning season under McFarland came in 2000, his third season, when they went 37-22. After another 30-win season in 2001, the Dukes qualified for the NCAA tournament in 2002. After a 41-12 regular season in which they won the CAA's American Division and McFarland was named CAA Coach of the Year, they went 2-2 in the CAA Tournament. After receiving an at-large bid to the NCAA tournament as the third seed in the Columbia Regional, they went 1-2, getting a win against VCU in an elimination game.

After missing the CAA Tournament in 2004 and 2005, the Dukes went 38-21 in 2006 and won the CAA regular season title. They finished third in the CAA Tournament, however, and did not receive an at-large bid to the NCAA tournament.

McFarland's best four-year stretch at James Madison came from 2008 to 2011. In this stretch, the Dukes had three 30-win seasons and a 40-win season. They won two CAA regular season titles (2010 and 2011) and appeared in two NCAA tournaments (2008 and 2011). In 2008, at the Raleigh Regional, the Dukes again went 1-2 with a win in the 0-1 game. In 2010, the team won the regular season title but lost in the tournament; McFarland was named the CAA's Co-Coach of the Year. In 2011, they reached the Chapel Hill Regional final in their deepest postseason run under McFarland.

James Madison had losing records in 2012, 2013, and 2014, finishing no higher than 6th in the CAA.

At James Madison, McFarland has had many major award winners and draftees. CAA award winners include Players of the Year Eddie Kim (2002 and 2003), Kellen Kulbacki (2006), and Jake Lowery (2011). Kulbacki was named a First-Team All-American in both 2006 and 2007. Between 1998 and 2014, 28 of his players have been selected in the Major League Baseball draft. Rich Thompson, Dan Meyer, and Ryan Reid went on to appear in Major League Baseball.

In the fall of 2014, McFarland announced that he would retire after the 2015 season. That year, the Dukes finished 18-33 and missed the CAA Tournament.

== Personal life ==
McFarland's son, Ty, played for him at James Madison from 2011 to 2014. He was a 10th-round selection of the New York Yankees in the 2014 Major League Baseball draft.

In 1990, McFarland wrote a book titled Coaching Pitchers. It was re-published in 2003.

== Head coaching record ==
=== Junior college ===
Record table
Season	Team	Overall	Conference	Standing	Postseason
Kellogg Community College (1979–1980)
1979	Kellogg CC				
1980	Kellogg CC				
Kellogg CC:		33–13			
Total:		33–13			

=== College ===
Below is a table of McFarland's records as a collegiate head baseball coach.

Record table
Season	Team	Overall	Conference	Standing	Postseason
Northern Illinois Huskies (NCAA Division I independent) (1991)
1991	Northern Illinois	11–25			
Northern Illinois Huskies (Mid–Continent Conference) (1992–1994)
1992	Northern Illinois	18–36	6–16	5th (Gray)	
1993	Northern Illinois	16–34–1	6–13	7th	
1994	Northern Illinois	23–30	10–14	7th	
Northern Illinois Huskies (Horizon League) (1995–1997)
1995	Northern Illinois	29–27	9–7	2nd (West)	Horizon Tournament
1996	Northern Illinois	27–30	12–10	T–3rd	NCAA Play-in Game
1997	Northern Illinois	22–29	12–12	T–4th	Horizon Tournament
Northern Illinois:		146–211	55–72		
James Madison Dukes (Colonial Athletic Association) (1998–2015)
1998	James Madison	27–29	11–8	3rd	CAA Tournament (Note: In this season, all of the CAA's members qualified for the postseason baseball tournament.)
1999	James Madison	22–35–1	6–15	8th	CAA Tournament
2000	James Madison	37–22	12–9	4th	CAA Tournament
2001	James Madison	36–23	10–11	5th	CAA Tournament (Note: In this season, all eligible members of the CAA qualified for the postseason baseball tournament.)
2002	James Madison	44–16	9–3	1st (American)	NCAA Regional
2003	James Madison	29–27	13–7	2nd (American)	CAA Tournament
2004	James Madison	28–26	8–16	7th	
2005	James Madison	20–35	8–16	8th	
2006	James Madison	38–21	22–8	1st	CAA Tournament
2007	James Madison	22–31	11–17	9th	
2008	James Madison	39–19	20–9	2nd	NCAA Regional
2009	James Madison	30–24	12–11	7th	
2010	James Madison	30–23	18–6	1st	CAA Tournament
2011	James Madison	42–19	21–9	1st	NCAA Regional
2012	James Madison	16–35–2	10–20	10th	
2013	James Madison	25–30	11–15	8th	CAA tournament
2014	James Madison	17–36	8–12	6th	CAA tournament
2015	James Madison	18–33	6–18	T–8th	
James Madison:		521–473–4	216–210		
Total:		667–684–4			
National champion Postseason invitational champion Conference regular season champion Conference regular season and conference tournament champion Division regular season champion Division regular season and conference tournament champion Conference tournament champion

== See also ==
- James Madison Dukes
