= Cullen Large =

American baseball player (born 1996)

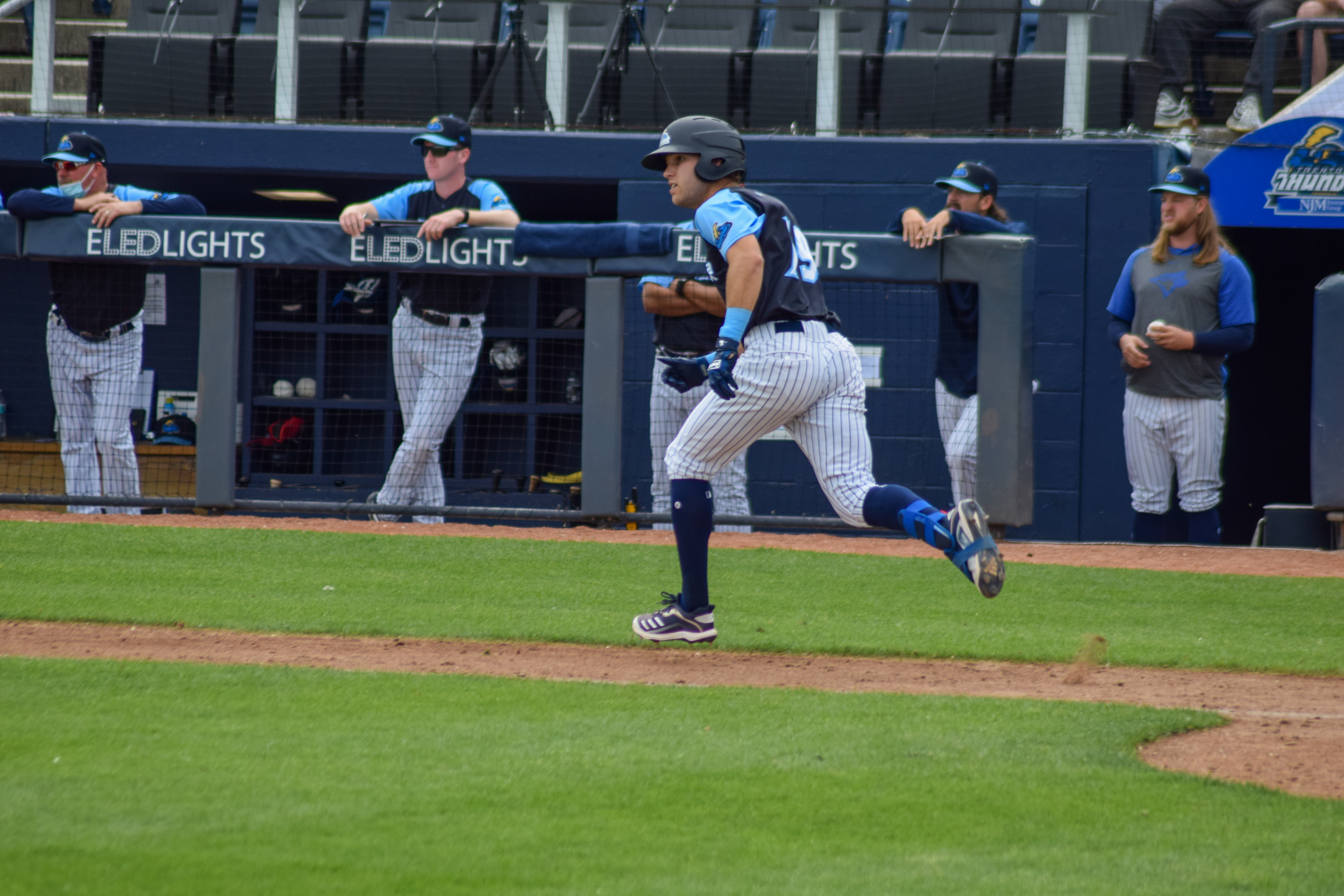
- Outfielder / Infielder
- Born: January 22, 1996 (age 30); Midlothian, Virginia, U.S.
- Bats: Right Throws: Right

Cullen Large (born January 22, 1996) is an American former professional baseball infielder and outfielder.

== College ==
Large played college baseball at William & Mary for three seasons. He was named second team All-Colonial Athletic Association (CAA) after hitting .328 with seven home runs in his sophomore season. As a junior, Large batted .338 with 24 extra-base hits and 39 RBIs with 45 runs scored and was named first team All-CAA.

== Professional career ==
Large was selected in the 5th round of the 2017 Major League Baseball draft by the Toronto Blue Jays. After signing with the team he was assigned to the Vancouver Canadians of the Low–A Northwest League, where he mostly played second base. Large spent the 2018 season with the Single–A Lansing Lugnuts of the Midwest League, where he batted .316 through 27 games before suffering a season-ending shoulder injury. He was assigned to the Dunedin Blue Jays of the Florida State League to start the 2019 season and moved to third base with the High–A Dunedin Blue Jays before being promoted to the Double-A New Hampshire Fisher Cats. Between the three levels, Large played in 110 games and hit .260/.340/.388 with 4 home runs and 49 RBI.

Large did not play in a game in 2020 due to the cancellation of the minor league season because of the COVID-19 pandemic. Large was named to the Blue Jays' 2021 spring training roster as a non-roster invitee. He did not make the team and spent the year with the Triple–A Buffalo Bisons, playing in 115 games and hitting .256/.341/.385 with a career–high 8 home runs and 44 RBI. In 2022, Large played in 119 games for the Bisons, batting .238/.327/.365 with 7 home runs and a career–high 52 RBI.

On March 23, 2023, Large was released by the Blue Jays organization.
