= University Field (Hofstra) =

Baseball venue in Hempstead, New York

- Interactive map of University Field
- Location: Hofstra Boulevard, Hempstead, New York, USA
- Coordinates: 40.720236°N 73.598557°W
- Owner: Hofstra University
- Operator: Hofstra University
- Capacity: 400
- Surface: Competition Turf (infield); Natural grass (outfield)
- Scoreboard: Electronic
- Field size: 331 feet (Left field); 380 feet (Center field); 340 feet (Right field)

Construction
- Renovated: 1990, 1991, 2002-3, 2004, 2006, 2010

Tenant
- Hofstra Pride baseball (CAA)

University Field is a baseball venue in Hempstead, New York, United States. It is home to the Hofstra Pride baseball team of the NCAA Division I Colonial Athletic Association. The facility has a capacity of 400 spectators. The field features a Competition Turf artificial surface in the infield and a natural grass surface in the outfield.

== Renovations ==
In the 1990s and 2000s, the facility underwent several renovations. In 1990, a new, wooden outfield wall was constructed. In 1991, new dugouts were added, foul territory fencing was replaced, and fencing was built around the bullpens. In 2002 and 2003, 70-foot sunken dugouts with fencing were constructed. In 2004, the warning track was resurfaced. In 2006, a new electronic scoreboard, located beyond the right center field fence, was installed. In 2010, the Quinn Family Grandstand, which includes 400 chairback seats and a press box, was completed.

== See also ==
- List of NCAA Division I baseball venues
