= Mark Scalf =

American baseball coach (born 1958)

Biographical details
- Born: October 3, 1958 (age 68)

Playing career
- 1977–1980: UNC Wilmington
- Position: Second baseman

Coaching career (HC unless noted)
- 1981–1983: North Carolina (Asst.)
- 1984–1991: UNC Wilmington (Asst.)
- 1992–2019: UNC Wilmington

Head coaching record
- Overall: 941–686–1
- Tournaments: NCAA: 15–20

Accomplishments and honors

Awards
- CAA Coach of the Year:1995, 2000, 2005, 2008, 2012

Mark Scalf (born October 3, 1958) is an American college baseball coach and former player. He served as head coach of the UNC Wilmington Seahawks baseball program from 1992 to the conclusion of the 2019 season.

== Background ==
Scalf is a native of Cary, North Carolina and attended Cary High School. He is a four-time letter winner at second base for UNC Wilmington, from 1977 through 1980. The Seahawks began play in Division I in Scalf's freshman year.

== Coaching career ==
After completing his playing career, Scalf earned a graduate assistant coach position at North Carolina in 1981. He became a full-time assistant the following season, helping the Tar Heels to two ACC tournament titles, an ACC regular season championship, and two NCAA tournament appearances in his three seasons in Chapel Hill. In 1984, he returned to UNC Wilmington as an assistant to Bobby Guthrie. In the summer of 1985, he skippered the Wareham Gatemen of the Cape Cod Baseball League. In 1992, he succeeded Guthrie as head coach, and has since become the Seahawks all-time win leader. Scalf has earned five Colonial Athletic Association Coach of the Year Awards, placed 45 players into the professional ranks, and served as an assistant coach on the 2003 and 2007 USA Baseball teams, both of which earned silver medals.

== Head coaching record ==
This table shows Scalf's record as a head coach at the Division I level.

Record table
Season	Team	Overall	Conference	Standing	Postseason
UNC Wilmington (Colonial Athletic Association) (1992–2019)
1992	UNC Wilmington	23–28	7–11	6th (7)	CAA Tournament (Note: All seven of the CAA's teams qualified for the tournament in 1992.)
1993	UNC Wilmington	26–29	6–8	4th (7)	CAA Tournament (Note: All seven of the CAA's teams qualified for the tournament in 1993.)
1994	UNC Wilmington	30–28	10–8	4th (7)	CAA Tournament (Note: All seven of the CAA's teams qualified for the tournament in 1994.)
1995	UNC Wilmington	30–25	11–7	2nd (7)	CAA Tournament (Note: All seven of the CAA's teams qualified for the tournament in 1995.)
1996	UNC Wilmington	28–30	9–11	7th (8)	CAA Tournament (Note: All eight of the CAA's teams qualified for the tournament in 1996.)
1997	UNC Wilmington	28–29	7–12	8th (8)	CAA Tournament (Note: All eight of the CAA's teams qualified for the tournament in 1997.)
1998	UNC Wilmington	21–34	6–14	7th (8)	CAA Tournament (Note: All eight of the CAA's teams qualified for the tournament in 1998.)
1999	UNC Wilmington	30–26	8–13	6th (8)	CAA Tournament (Note: All eight of the CAA's teams qualified for the tournament in 1999.)
2000	UNC Wilmington	36–23	13–8	3rd (8)	CAA Tournament (Note: All eight of the CAA's teams qualified for the tournament in 2000.)
2001	UNC Wilmington	33–22	11–9	4th (8)	CAA Tournament (Note: All six of the CAA's eligible teams qualified for the tournament in 2001. East Carolina and Richmond were ineligible.)
2002	UNC Wilmington	36–21	14–7	2nd American (5)	CAA Tournament (Note: The top six finishers of the CAA's ten teams qualified for the tournament in 2002.)
2003	UNC Wilmington	40–23	15–6	1st American (5)	NCAA Regional
2004	UNC Wilmington	40–23	17–6	2nd (9)	NCAA Regional
2005	UNC Wilmington	40–19	21–3	1st (9)	CAA Tournament (Note: The top six of the CAA's nine teams qualified for the tournament in 2005.)
2006	UNC Wilmington	42–22	17–13	5th (11)	NCAA Regional
2007	UNC Wilmington	29–27	18–11	4th (11)	CAA Tournament (Note: The top six finishers of the CAA's eleven teams qualified for the tournament in 2007.)
2008	UNC Wilmington	44–17–1	25–4–1	1st (11)	NCAA Regional
2009	UNC Wilmington	31–23	10–8	3rd (11)	CAA Tournament (Note: The top six finishers of the CAA's eleven teams qualified for the tournament in 2009.)
2010	UNC Wilmington	33–27	13–11	4th (11)	CAA Tournament (Note: The top four finishers of the CAA's eleven teams qualified for the tournament in 2010.)
2011	UNC Wilmington	31–28	18–12	3rd (11)	CAA Tournament (Note: The top four finishers of the CAA's eleven teams qualified for the tournament in 2011.)
2012	UNC Wilmington	39–23	24–6	1st (11)	NCAA Regional
2013	UNC Wilmington	38–23	18–8	1st (10)	NCAA Regional
2014	UNC Wilmington	30–27	10–8	3rd (8)	CAA tournament
2015	UNC Wilmington	41-18	16-8	2nd	NCAA Regional
2016	UNC Wilmington	41-19	16-6	1st	NCAA Regional
2017	UNC Wilmington	30-29	16-8	2nd	CAA tournament
2018	UNC Wilmington	39-23	14-9	4th	NCAA Regional
2019	UNC Wilmington	32-31	12-12	T-3rd (9)	NCAA Regional
UNC Wilmington:		941–686–1	382–247–1		
Total:		941–686–1			
National champion Postseason invitational champion Conference regular season champion Conference regular season and conference tournament champion Division regular season champion Division regular season and conference tournament champion Conference tournament champion
