= Georgia State Panthers baseball =

Collegiate baseball team

Georgia State Panthers
- 2026 Georgia State Panthers baseball team
- Founded: 1956
- University: Georgia State University
- Head coach: Brad Stromdahl (7th season)
- Conference: Sun Belt; East Division
- Location: Atlanta, Georgia
- Home stadium: GSU Baseball Complex (capacity: 1,092)
- Nickname: Panthers
- Colors: Blue and white

NCAA tournament appearances
- 2009

Conference tournament champions
- 2009

Conference regular season champions
- 1996, 1998

The Georgia State Panthers baseball team represents Georgia State University in NCAA Division I college baseball. The team currently competes in the Sun Belt Conference. It first began competing there before moving to the TAAC, and the CAA. Beginning July 1, 2013, Georgia State returned to the Sun Belt Conference for all sports. The Panthers play their home games at Georgia State's Panthersville sports complex in the GSU Baseball Complex.

== History ==
The Georgia State Panthers baseball team first began playing in 1956 led by head coach Herbert "Stony" Burgess. The team would begin competition in the newly formed Sun Belt Conference in 1979 before moving to the Trans American Athletic Conference (TAAC) in 1984. The team joined the CAA in 2006. In 2014, the Panthers moved back to the Sun Belt Conference.

In its history, the team has been conference champions during the 1996 and 1998 season. Only during the 2009 season did the team win the conference tournament giving them an automatic berth into the 2009 NCAA Division I baseball tournament.

The program has produced one major league player. David Buchanan, a right-handed pitcher who played for the Panthers in 2010, made his major league debut on May 24, 2014. Buchanan made 35 starts on the mound for the Phillies over the 2014 and 2015 seasons.

On June 26, 2019, Brad Stromdahl was named the head coach of the program.

== NCAA Tournament ==
Georgia State has participated in the NCAA Division I baseball tournament once.

Year	Region	Round	Opponent	Result
2009	Atlanta Regional	First Round; Lower Round 1	Georgia Tech; Elon	L 3–9; L 3–4

== Stadium ==
The Panthers play in the 1,092-seat GSU Baseball Complex located in Panthersville, GA, several miles from the main Georgia State campus. The left field measures 334 feet, the center field measures 385, while right field measures 338 feet. The outfield wall, which was installed prior to the 1998 season, came from the original home of the Atlanta Braves, Fulton County Stadium.

In January 2021, it was revealed Georgia State plans on building a new 1,000 baseball stadium on the site of former Fulton County Stadium. Construction is expected to be completed in February 2026.

== Head coaches ==
The Panthers have had 10 head coaches in the history of their baseball program:

	Coach	Seasons	Wins	Losses	Ties	Win %
10	Brad Stromdahl	2020–present	112	130	0	.463
9	Greg Frady	2007–2019	370	365	1	.503
8	Mike Hurst	1993–2006	293	432	0	.404
7	Kurt Seibert	1992–1993	12	55	0	.179
6	Gary Nave	1983–1986	70	122	1	.365
5	Jim Dorsey	1981–1982	32	71	0	.311
4	Jack Humphrey	1979–1980	46	37	0	.554
3	Ron Kennett	1970–1972	16	75	0	.176
2	Archie Crenshaw	1965–1967	6	29	0	.171
1	Herbert "Stony" Burgess	1956–1960	23	24	0	.489

== Notable players ==
- David Buchanan was the first former Panther to play for a Major League Baseball franchise. He was a pitcher for the Philadelphia Phillies (2014–15) and the Cincinnati Reds (2024)
- Hunter Gaddis was drafted in the fifth round of the 2019 Major League Baseball First-Year Player Draft by the Cleveland Guardians, making him the highest draft pick in school history, surpassing the 2010 seventh-round selection of David Buchanan by the Philadelphia Phillies.

== Baseball seasons ==
	Year	Wins	Losses	Ties	Games	Championships
1	1966	1	8	0	9
2	1967	4	13	0	17
3	1968	0	0	0	0	Program dormant
4	1969	0	0	0	0	Program dormant
5	1970	6	17	0	23
6	1971	6	26	0	32
7	1972	4	31	0	35
8	1973	0	0	0	0	Program dormant
9	1974	0	0	0	0	Program dormant
10	1975	0	0	0	0	Program dormant
11	1976	0	0	0	0	Program dormant
12	1977	0	0	0	0	Program dormant
13	1978	0	0	0	0	Program dormant
14	1979	16	12	0	28
15	1980	30	25	0	55
16	1981	17	33	0	50
17	1982	17	38	0	55
18	1983	12	34	0	47
19	1984	22	31	1	54
20	1985	17	28	0	45
21	1986	23	29	0	52
22	1987	0	0	0	0	Program dormant
23	1988	0	0	0	0	Program dormant
24	1989	0	0	0	0	Program dormant
25	1990	0	0	0	0	Program dormant
26	1991	0	0	0	0	Program dormant
27	1992	2	30	0	32
28	1993	12	35	0	47
29	1994	12	42	0	54
30	1995	20	33	0	53
31	1996	21	32	0	53	TAAC East regular season winner
32	1997	23	30	0	53
33	1998	23	29	0	52	TAAC East regular season winner
34	1999	23	33	0	56
35	2000	31	28	0	59
36	2001	20	35	0	55
37	2002	24	32	0	56
38	2003	25	29	0	54
39	2004	18	36	0	54
40	2005	25	32	0	57
41	2006	26	31	0	57
42	2007	26	32	0	58
43	2008	33	23	0	56
44	2009	39	22	0	61	CAA Tournament Champions, NCAA Atlanta Regional
45	2010	34	23	0	57
46	2011	37	21	0	58
47	2012	24	31	0	55
48	2013	35	21	0	56
49	2014	25	31	0	56
50	2015	30	27	0	57
51	2016	24	31	0	55
52	2017	22	33	0	55
53	2018	26	29	0	55
54	2019	15	41	0	55
55	2020	9	7	0	16	(Season cut short by the COVID-19 pandemic)
56	2021	18	37	0	55
57	2022	30	27	0	57
58	2023	30	29	0	59
59	2024	25	32	0	57
60	2025	26	30	0	56

== See also ==
- List of NCAA Division I baseball programs
