= Brooks Field (Wilmington) =

Baseball stadium at the University of North Carolina Wilmington

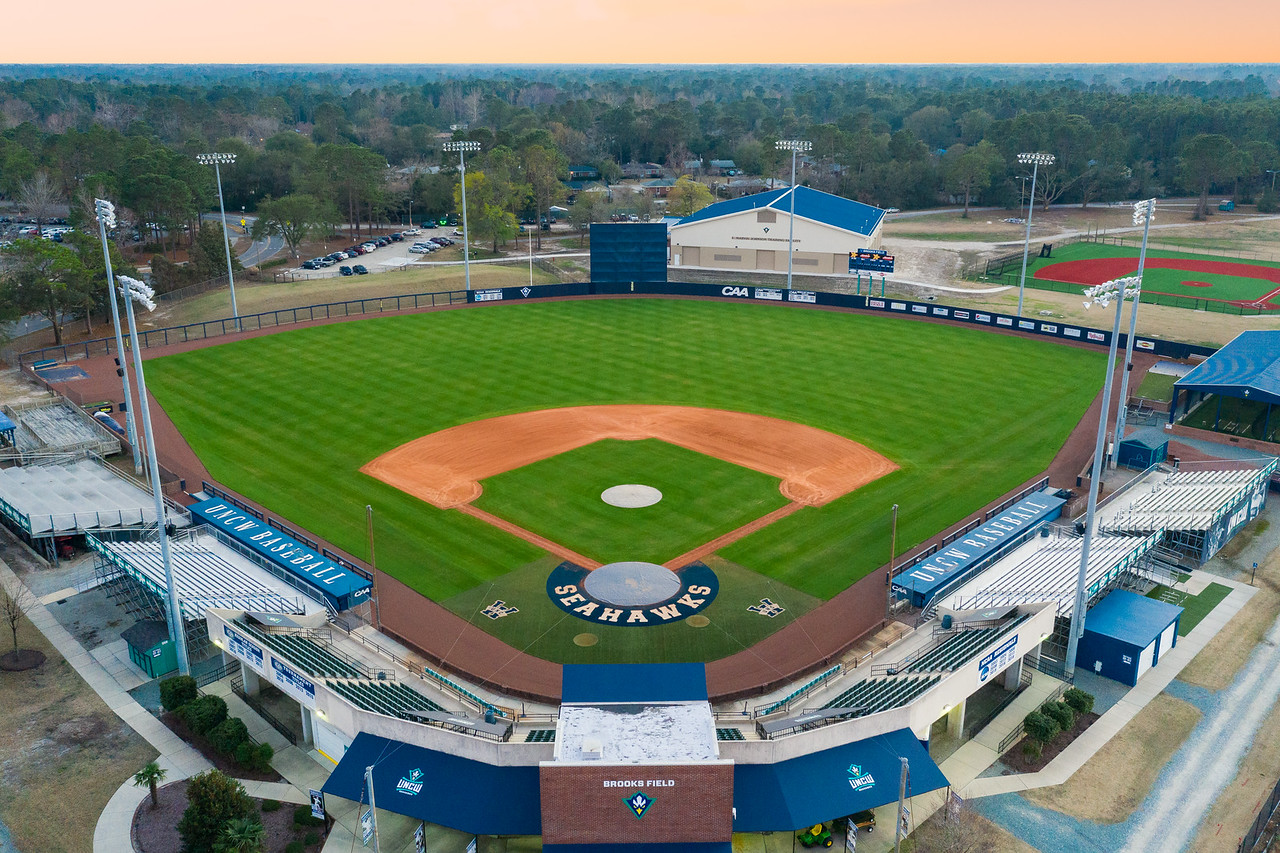
- The stadium in 2019
- Interactive map of Brooks Field
- Full name: Bill Brooks Field
- Address: 4958 Regel Road; Wilmington, NC; United States
- Coordinates: 34.221942°N 77.873301°W
- Capacity: 3,500
- Type: Ballpark
- Record attendance: 3,826 (February 16, 2014 vs #1 Virginia)
- Field size: Left field: 340 ft (100 m); Center field: 380 ft (120 m); Right field: 340 ft (100 m)
- Current use: Baseball

Construction
- Opened: 1989; 37 years ago

Tenants
- UNCW Seahawks (CAA) 1989–present; Port City Roosters (SL) 1995–1996; Wilmington Waves (SAL) 2001; CAA Tournament 1989–90, 1993, 2004–2011, 2014, 2017

Website
- uncwsports.com/brooks-field

Brooks Field is a baseball stadium located on the campus of the University of North Carolina Wilmington in Wilmington, North Carolina. Brooks Field is the home of the UNC Wilmington Seahawks baseball team and has hosted the Coastal Athletic Association baseball tournament a number of times (1989–90, 1993, 2004–11, 2014, 2017). The ballpark has a capacity of 3,500 people and first opened in 1989. In 2014 UNCW broke the 2009 record attendance of 3,608 (vs North Carolina) with 3,826 people (vs. #1 Virginia).

== Name ==
The stadium is named after former UNCW coach and athletic director Bill Brooks. He started the athletic program when UNCW was a junior college and served past the school becoming a Division I program and joining the Coastal Athletic Association. Brooks served 40 years at the school, 27 as the baseball coach, with a career win–loss record of 574–292–5. His name, with the number 574, is on the wall in left field at Brooks Field.

== Stadium design and features ==
Brooks Field is a symmetric park where it is 340 feet from home plate to the foul poles and is 380 feet to deep center field. Seating consists of a main set of seats that extends from roughly the third base line to the first base line. There are two sets of bleachers on each side of the main seating area. There is also a berm located behind the left field fence, which fans can also sit at. The stadium has one concession stand and a small team store behind the away dugout. A simple electronic scoreboard sits in right-center field.

== Minor league history ==
The ballpark was home to the Southern League's Class AA Port City Roosters in 1995 and 1996 and the South Atlantic League's Class A Wilmington Waves in 2001.

== See also ==
- List of NCAA Division I baseball venues
