= Hofstra Pride baseball =

Hofstra Pride
- 2026 Hofstra Pride baseball team
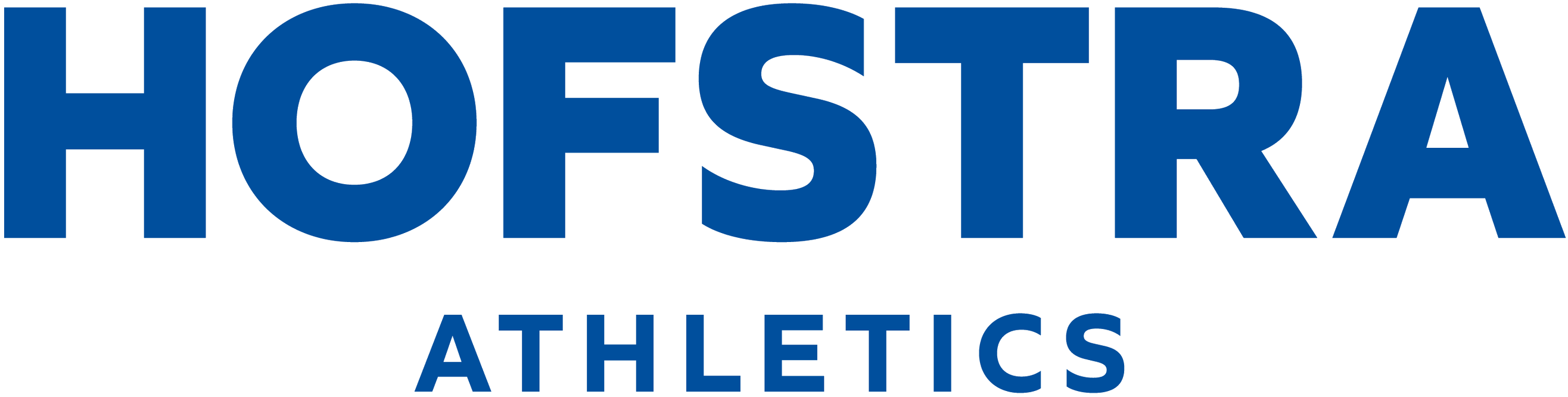
- Founded: 1938; 88 years ago
- University: Hofstra University
- Athletic director: Rick Cole Jr.
- Head coach: Frank Catalanotto (5th season)
- Conference: Colonial Athletic Association
- Location: Hempstead, New York
- Home stadium: University Field (Capacity: 400)
- Nickname: Pride
- Colors: Blue, white, and gold

NCAA tournament appearances
- 2022

Conference tournament champions
- CAA; 2022

The Hofstra Pride baseball team is the varsity intercollegiate baseball team of Hofstra University in Hempstead, New York, United States. The team competes in the National Collegiate Athletic Association's Division I and are members of the Colonial Athletic Association.

The Pride play home games at University Field in Hempstead.

The team's head coach is former MLB infielder / outfielder Frank Catalanotto.

== Hofstra in the NCAA tournament ==
Year	Record	Pct	Notes
2022	0–2	.000	Chapel Hill Regional
TOTALS	0-2	.000	
