= Towson Tigers baseball =

Towson University baseball team

Towson Tigers
- 2026 Towson Tigers baseball team
- Founded: 1966
- University: Towson University
- Head coach: Liam Bowen (1st season)
- Conference: Colonial Athletic Association
- Location: Towson, Maryland
- Home stadium: John B. Schuerholz Baseball Complex (capacity: 500)
- Nickname: Tigers
- Colors: Black and gold

NCAA tournament appearances
- Division II: 1978; Division I: 1988, 1991, 2013

Conference tournament champions
- 1988, 1991, 2013

Conference regular season champions
- 1988, 1999

The Towson Tigers baseball team is the varsity intercollegiate athletic team of the Towson University in Towson, Maryland, United States. The team competes in the National Collegiate Athletic Association's Division I and are members of the Colonial Athletic Association.

Previously, they had played in NCAA Division II until 1980. They played in the East Coast Conference from 1980 to 1992 before joining the Big South Conference for the 1993–1995 seasons and then playing in the America East Conference from 1996–2001 before entering the CAA in 2002.

== Towson in the NCAA tournament ==
Year	Record	Pct	Notes
1988	1–2	.333	Atlantic Regional
1991	1–2	.333	Northeast Regional
2013	1–2	.333	Chapel Hill Regional
TOTALS	3-6	.333	

== Tigers drafted in the MLB draft ==
- 1983 John Andrade INF Texas Rangers 24th round
- 1988 Chris Nabholz LHP Montreal Expos 2nd round
- 1995 Derek Hasselhoff RHP Chicago White Sox 17th round
- 1995 Mike Vota RHP Chicago White Sox 18th round
- 1996 Chris Karabinus LHP Los Angeles Dodgers 8th round
- 1999 Chris Fiora RHP St. Louis Cardinals 22nd round
- 1999 Jason Rummel INF Chicago White Sox 29th round
- 2000 Chris Russ LHP Texas Rangers 3rd round
- 2000 Denny Chapman RHP San Diego Padres 27th round
- 2001 Bryan Simmering RHP Oakland Athletics 27th round
- 2002 Gregg Davies OF Baltimore Orioles 21st round
- 2005 Casper Wells OF Detroit Tigers 14th round
- 2005 Shane Justis SS Los Angeles Dodgers 21st round
- 2007 Preston Pehrson C Baltimore Orioles 47th round
- 2008 Brian Conley OF Baltimore Orioles 17th round
- 2009 Josh Squatrito RHP St. Louis Cardinals 25th round
- 2010 Drew Permison RHP Toronto Blue Jays 42nd round
- 2011 Charlie Cononie RHP Tampa Bay Rays 24th round
- 2016 Brady Policelli SS Detroit Tigers 13th round
- 2018 Richie Palacios INF Cleveland Indians 3rd round
- 2023 Ethan Pecko RHP Houston Astros 6th round
