= William & Mary Tribe baseball =

American college baseball team

William & Mary Tribe
- 2026 William & Mary Tribe baseball team
- Founded: 1895; 131 years ago
- University: College of William & Mary
- Head coach: Rob McCoy (2nd season)
- Conference: Coastal Athletic Association
- Location: Williamsburg, Virginia
- Home stadium: Plumeri Park (capacity: 1,000)
- Nickname: Tribe
- Colors: Green and Gold

NCAA tournament appearances
- 1983, 2001, 2013, 2016

Conference tournament champions
- 1983, 2001, 2016

Conference regular season champions
- 1906, 1911, 1914, 1915, 1983, 2001, 2014

The William & Mary Tribe baseball team represents the College of William & Mary in Williamsburg, Virginia in NCAA Division I competition. The school's team, founded in 1895, currently competes in the Colonial Athletic Association and play their home games at the off-campus Plumeri Park.

== History ==
The Tribe have played in four NCAA tournaments, 1983, 2001, 2013, and 2016, but have never qualified for the College World Series. The Tribe's combined NCAA tournament record is 4–8 (.333). They have won seven conference championships, with the most recent coming in 2016. The team has an all-time record of 1,432–1,565–12 (.478) over 119 season of play.

=== Conference affiliations ===
- Southern Conference − 1947–1977
- ECAC South − 1983–1985
- Colonial Athletic Association − 1986–present

== Venue ==
The William & Mary Tribe men's baseball team currently plays at off-campus Plumeri Park which opened in 2001 and has a seating capacity of 1,000. The stadium is named after William & Mary alumnus Joseph J. Plumeri II who also played on the baseball team as member of the Class of 1966. Previously, the baseball team played on campus on a field located next to Zable Stadium on land currently occupied by practice fields for the football team as part of the Jimmye Laycock Football Center.

== Head coaches ==
The program's longest tenured head coaches was Jim Farr who served as head coach for 12 seasons from 1993 to 2005.

Year(s)	Coach	Seasons	W-L-T	Pct
1895–1904	Unknown	10	7–8–1	.469
1905–1906	J. Merrill Blanchard	2	5–0	1.000
1907	James H. Barry	1	—	—
1908	H. B. White	1	—	—
1909–1910	George E. O'Hearn	2	—	—
1911	Frederick R. Savage; W. J. Young	1	4–2	.667
1912–1913	Unknown	2	8–23	.258
1914–1916	Dexter W. Draper	3	33–14	.702
1917	Samuel H. Hubbard	1	—	—
1918	Bathurst Peachy	1	5–7	.417
1919	Vernon Geddy	1	5–7	.417
1920–1923	James G. Driver	4	46–26	.639
1924–1928	J. Wilder Tasker	4	59–50–2	.541
1929–1930	Harry Young	2	30–15	.667
1931–1931, 1938	John Kellison	5	63–25	.716
1935–1937	Bill Scott	3	33–27–1	.549
1939–1941	Rube McCray	3	21–32–2	.400
1941–1942	Albert H. Werner	2	15–16	.484
1943–1945	No team held	—	—	—
1946	Sam B. Holt	1	14–4	.778
1947	Richard F. Gallagher	1	9–9	.500
1948	Marvin Bass	1	11–5	.688
1949	Orlin Rogers	1	18–8	.692
1950–1951	Howard Smith	2	11–27	.289
1952, 1966–1970	H. Lester Hooker	6	92–81	.532
1953–1957	Eric Tipton	5	33–54	.380
1958–1959	Ed Derringe	2	7–23	.233
1960–1964	Joe Agee	5	16–69	.188
1965, 1979–1982	Maynard Weber	5	28–106	.209
1971	Bo Rein	1	19–16	.543
1972	George Pearce	1	15–18	.455
1973	Les Roes	1	11–15	.423
1974	Tony Zontini	1	8–17	.320
1975–1978, 1982–1985	Ed Jones	8	115–162–3	.416
1986–1987	Joe Breeden	2	22–69	.242
1988	Chris Rankin	1	17–28	.378
1989–1992	Bill Harris	4	49–114–1	.302
1993–2005	Jim Farr	13	372–313–2	.543
2006–2012	Frank Leoni	7	196–178	.524
2013	Jamie Pinzino	1	39–24	.619
2014–2021	Brian Murphy	8	189–307	.381
2022–2024	Mike McRae	3	90–74	.549
2025–present	Rob McCoy	1		
TOTALS	48	126	1,587–1,850–12	.460

== NCAA tournament results ==
Year	Round	Record	Result
1983	East Regional	North Carolina	L, 0–11
1983	East Regional	James Madison	L 8–13
2001	Clemson Regional	Clemson	L 1–4
2001	Clemson Regional	South Alabama	L 4–8
2013	Raleigh Regional	Ole Miss	W 4–2
2013	Raleigh Regional	NC State	L 1–0
2013	Raleigh Regional	Ole Miss	W 4–1
2013	Raleigh Regional	NC State	L 2–9
2016	Charlottesville Regional	#8 Virginia	L 4−17
2016	Charlottesville Regional	Bryant	W 4−3
2016	Charlottesville Regional	#8 Virginia	W 5−4
2016	Charlottesville Regional	East Carolina	L 4−8

== Notable former players ==
=== Consensus All-Americans ===
Player	Position	Year
Chris Rahl	OF	2004
Michael Katz	OF	2014

=== MLB players ===
Player	Position	Major League Teams
Bill Bray	P	Washington Nationals (2006); Cincinnati Reds (2006–2008, 2010–2012)
Adam Butler	P	Atlanta Braves (1998)
Brendan Harris	IF	Chicago Cubs (2004); Montreal Expos/Washington Nationals (2004–06); Cincinnati Reds (2006); Tampa Bay Devil Rays (2007); Minnesota Twins (2008–10)
Owen Kahn	OF	Boston Braves (1930)
Bud Metheny	OF	New York Yankees (1943–46)
Curtis Pride	OF	Montreal Expos (1993, 1995, 2001); Detroit Tigers (1996–97); Boston Red Sox (1997, 2000); Atlanta Braves (1998); New York Yankees (2003); Anaheim Angels (2004–06)
Vic Raschi	P	New York Yankees (1946–53); St. Louis Cardinals (1954–55); Kansas City Athletics (1956)
Chris Ray	P	Baltimore Orioles (2005–09); Texas Rangers (2009–10); San Francisco Giants (2010); Seattle Mariners (2011)
Will Rhymes	2B	Detroit Tigers (2010–11); Tampa Bay Rays (2012)
Mike Smith	OF	New York Giants (1926)
Ben Williamson	3B	Seattle Mariners (2025); Tampa Bay Rays (2026)

=== MLB draftees ===
William & Mary has had 48 Major League Baseball draft selections since the draft began in 1965.

Tribe in the Major League Baseball Draft
Year	Player	Round	Team
1968	John Medlin	39	Royals
1971	Horace Richardson	13	Orioles
1985	Ed Stanko	13	Yankees
1990	Craig Ruyak	44	Cardinals
1993	Shawn Knight	75	Cubs
1994	Shawn Knight	13	Padres
1997	Will Malerich	24	Giants
1997	T.P. Waligora	15	Cubs
1998	Ron Bush	32	Tigers
1998	Andy Cook	13	Mets
1999	Randy Leek	18	Tigers
1999	Chris Kelley	17	Indians
2000	Brian Rogers	19	Marlins
2000	Rob Jones	14	Marlins
2001	Brendan Harris	5	Cubs
2003	Mark Harris	31	Indians
2003	Chris Shaver	24	Devil Rays
2003	Curtis Brown	13	Tigers
2003	Chris Ray	3	Orioles
2004	Chris Shaver	4	Cubs
2004	Bill Bray	1	Expos
2005	Will Rhymes	27	Tigers
2005	Kyle Padgett	18	Marlins
2005	Chris Rahl	5	Diamondbacks
2006	Joseph Kantakevich	13	Mariners
2007	Greg Sexton	10	Devil Rays
2008	Patrick Kantakevich	22	Orioles
2008	Sean Grieve	21	Phillies
2008	Ben Guez	19	Tigers
2008	Mike Sheridan	5	Rays
2009	Kevin Landry	21	Orioles
2012	Matt Davenport	34	Tigers
2013	John Farrell	21	Rays
2013	Ryan Lindemuth	20	Pirates
2014	Ryan Lindemuth	37	Yankees
2014	Michael Katz	9	Mets
2014	Nick Thompson	8	Cardinals
2015	Ryan Hissey	14	Blue Jays
2016	Charley Gould	26	Athletics
2017	Nick Raquet	3	Nationals
2017	Cullen Large	5	Blue Jays
2017	Nick Brown	32	Twins
2019	Jamie Sara	25	Phillies
2023	Ben Williamson	2	Mariners
2023	Cory Wall	8	Braves
2024	Nate Knowles	4	Rays
2024	Travis Garnett	8	Diamondbacks
2024	Joe Delossantos	10	Yankees
2025	Carter Lovasz	8	Braves
