= VCU Rams baseball =

- 2027 VCU Rams baseball team
- Founded: 1947; 79 years ago
- University: Virginia Commonwealth University
- Head coach: Sean Thompson (2nd season)
- Conference: Atlantic 10
- Location: Richmond, Virginia
- Home stadium: CarMax Park (capacity: 10,000)
- Nickname: Rams
- Colors: Black and gold

NCAA regional champions
- 2015

NCAA tournament appearances
- 1988, 1992, 1998, 1999, 2001, 2002, 2003, 2005, 2007, 2010, 2015, 2021, 2022, 2024, 2026

Conference tournament champions
- 1988, 2002, 2003, 2005, 2007, 2010, 2015, 2021, 2022, 2024, 2026

Conference regular season champions
- 2017, 2019, 2021

VCU Rams baseball represents Virginia Commonwealth University in all NCAA Division I baseball competitions. This program, established in 1971, is a member of the Atlantic 10 Conference. The Rams possess an 867–792–5 record with a 155–81 record in-conference (CAA). The head coach for the Rams is Sean Thompson. Significant past events are: First place CAA finishes in 1997, 1998, & 2003; 2002, 2003, 2005, 2007, & 2010 CAA Tournament champions, 8 NCAA Tournament appearances since 1996; and an average of 30 or more wins (56 game schedule) in each of the past 11 seasons.

== Accomplishments ==
In 1987, VCU went 25–22 for its first winning season in school history. The next year, the Rams made their first NCAA regional appearance.

- 15 NCAA Regionals
- 1 NCAA Super Regional
- 24 All-CAA honorees
- 16 All-Americans
- 5 CAA Championships
- 5 A-10 Championship

In 2015, VCU's 45th year of baseball, the Rams had their banner season. Led by Shawn Stiffler in his third season as head coach, the team at one point was 26–22 going into their last two conference weekends with playoff hopes diminishing if they didn't turn things around. The team went on to win 13 straight games, including the Atlantic 10 Conference Tournament held at George Washington University that year. The final play of the tournament was a diving catch by sophomore outfielder Logan Farrar that was recognized as one of the Top 10 plays. The Rams progressed to a tough regional hosted by Dallas Baptist University in Dallas, Texas that included VCU, Texas, and Oregon State. The Rams went 3–1 in the regional tournament beating Dallas Baptist three times outscoring them 12–4 and Oregon State once with a score of 5–1. The Rams then advanced to the NCAA Super Regional for the first time in school history where they faced the #5 overall seed in the tournament, Miami, in Coral Gables, FL. The team's cinderella run came to an end after two losses to Miami losing game one 2–3 and game two 3–10. The accomplishment of this team was recognized by the NCBWA and Collegiate Baseball writers who ranked the 2015 VCU Rams' team as 18th and 15th in the nation at the end of the season, respectively.

== VCU in the NCAA Tournament ==
The NCAA Division I baseball tournament started in 1947. The Rams have played in 15 tournaments, advancing to the Super Regionals in 2015.

Year	Record	Pct	Notes
1988	0–2	.000	Atlantic Regional
1991	4–2	.667	Central Regional
1998	2–2	.500	East Regional
1999	1–2	.333	Los Angeles Regional
2001	3–2	.600	Baton Rouge Regional
2002	0–2	.000	Columbia Regional
2003	1–2	.333	Wilson Regional
2005	0–2	.000	Coral Gables Regional
2007	0–2	.000	Myrtle Beach Regional
2010	0–2	.000	Charlottesville Regional
2015	3–2	.600	Dallas Regional Champions, Coral Gables Super Regional
2021	1–2	.333	Starkville Regional
2022	2–2	.500	Chapel Hill Regional
2024	1–2	.333	Greenville Regional
2026	1–2	.333	Chapel Hill Regional
TOTALS	19–30	.388	

== Records ==
VCU holds distinction as one of only two CAA Tournament teams that has produced a 1-hitter during the tournament, the other being Maika Symmonds of ODU, vs. Richmond, 5–20–95. Ram pitcher, Matt Prendergast, accomplished this feat against George Mason on May 25, 2003. VCU and GMU share the record for most RBI in a tournament with 11 by Brandon Inge, VCU, 1997 (4 games) and 11 by Jeff Palumbo, GMU, 2003 (5 games). The Rams also hold CAA Tournament records for most appearances by a single pitcher with 6 by Brian Marshall in 2002 (1 win, 4 saves), most strikeouts with 17 by Sean Marshall, also in 2002, (3 games, 12.0 IP), and most saves with 4 by Brian Marshall, again in 2002 (6 games).

== Alumni ==
VCU has produced several MLB draftees, some of whom have continued on to enjoy successful careers in MLB. Among these are: Brandon Inge (DET, 3B), Scott Sizemore (OAK, 3B), Sean Marshall (CHC, RP), Cody Eppley (NYY, RP).

=== Noteworthy contributions to CAA All-Conference teams ===
- Rookie of the Year (1996) & Co-player of the Year (1998), Brandon Inge, in 1996, 1997, & 1998
- Coach of the Year, Paul Keyes, 1997, 1998, & 2003
- Player of the Year and Defensive Player of the Year, Matt Davis, in 2001
- Rookie of the Year (2001), Sean Marshall
- Jason Dubois in 1998, 1999, & 2000
- Rookie of the Year (2004), Harold Mozingo
- Co-Defensive player of the Year (2005), Pete Farina
- Rookie of the Year (2005), Sergio Miranda
- Defensive Player of the Year (2007), Sergio Miranda

== Results of the 2006 MLB Draft ==
In the 2006 MLB draft, 28 CAA players were selected, including 3 from VCU – Harold Mozingo (RHP, KC, overall pick #167), Scott Sizemore (2B, DET, overall pick #142), and Michael Gibbs (RHP, COL, overall pick #498). Conferences comparable to the CAA, such as the Southern Conference the West Coast Conference, had 12 and 24 players drafted, respectively.

== See also ==
- List of NCAA Division I baseball programs
