= George Mason Patriots baseball =

- 2026 George Mason Patriots baseball team
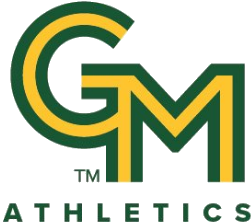
- Founded: 1968; 58 years ago
- University: George Mason University
- Head coach: Shawn Camp (4th season)
- Conference: Atlantic 10
- Location: Fairfax, Virginia
- Home stadium: Spuhler Field (Capacity: 900)
- Nickname: Patriots
- Colors: Green and gold

NCAA tournament appearances
- 1985, 1988, 1992, 1993, 2004, 2009, 2014, 2023

Conference tournament champions
- CAA: 1988, 1992; Atlantic 10: 2014, 2023

Conference regular season champions
- CAA: 1992, 1993, 2004, 2009

The George Mason Patriots baseball team is an intercollegiate baseball team representing George Mason University in NCAA Division I college baseball and has made six appearances in the NCAA tournament.

George Mason participates as a full member of the Atlantic 10 Conference. They have won four regular season championships and two tournaments as a member of the Colonial Athletic Association.

== History ==
=== Conference ===
- 1968–1981: Independent
- 1982–1985: Eastern College Athletic Conference
- 1986–2013: Colonial Athletic Association
- 2014–present: Atlantic 10 Conference

== Head coaches ==
Tenure	Coach	Years	Record	Pct.
1968–1979	Raymond "Hap" Spuhler	12	318–169–3	.652
1980–1981	Walt Masterson	2	33–43–1	.428
1982–2022	Bill Brown	41	1,083–1,056–7	.506
2023–present	Shawn Camp	2	57–59	.491
Totals	4 coaches	57 seasons	1489–1327–10	.529

== Year-by-year results ==
Year	Coach	Record	Notes
1968	Raymond "Hap" Spuhler	8–12	
1969	Raymond "Hap" Spuhler	16–15	
1970	Raymond "Hap" Spuhler	21–9	
1971	Raymond "Hap" Spuhler	21–15	
1972	Raymond "Hap" Spuhler	24–17	
1973	Raymond "Hap" Spuhler	32–12	
1974	Raymond "Hap" Spuhler	32–13	
1975	Raymond "Hap" Spuhler	30–9	
1976	Raymond "Hap" Spuhler	42–14	Reached NAIA World Series
1977	Raymond "Hap" Spuhler	28–19–1	
1978	Raymond "Hap" Spuhler	36–17–1	
1979	Raymond "Hap" Spuhler	28–17–1	
1980	Walt Masterson	14–25–1	
1981	Walt Masterson	19–18	
1982	Bill Brown	19–24	
1983	Bill Brown	19–24	
1984	Bill Brown	21–20	
1985	Bill Brown	38–23	
1986	Bill Brown	27–20–1	
1987	Bill Brown	31–23	
1988	Bill Brown	34–27–1	
1989	Bill Brown	23–25	
1990	Bill Brown	30–28	
1991	Bill Brown	30–27	
1992	Bill Brown	39–18	
1993	Bill Brown	33–18	
1994	Bill Brown	18–32–1	
1995	Bill Brown	31–25	
1996	Bill Brown	25–29	
1997	Bill Brown	29–24	
1998	Bill Brown	26–28	
1999	Bill Brown	30–24–1	
2000	Bill Brown	21–34–1	
2001	Bill Brown	21–32	
2002	Bill Brown	28–29	
2003	Bill Brown	31–20	
2004	Bill Brown	39–19	
2005	Bill Brown	35–19	
2006	Bill Brown	20–31	
2007	Bill Brown	27–27	
2008	Bill Brown	30–25	
2009	Bill Brown	42–12	
2010	Bill Brown	28–22	
2011	Bill Brown	21–32–1	
2012	Bill Brown	33–24	
2013	Bill Brown	18–35	
2014	Bill Brown	34–22	
2015	Bill Brown	23–27–1	
2016	Bill Brown	19–35	
2017	Bill Brown	26–33	
2018	Bill Brown	29–27	
2019	Bill Brown	19–35	
2020	Bill Brown	1–14	
2021	Bill Brown	14–29	
2022	Bill Brown	23–33	
2023	Shawn Camp	34–27	

== George Mason in the NCAA tournament ==
- The NCAA Division I baseball tournament started in 1947.
- The format of the tournament has changed through the years.

Year	Record	Pct	Notes
1985	0–2	.000	Eliminated by Arkansas in the South II Regional
1988	0–2	.000	Eliminated by Stetson in the East Regional
1992	1–2	.333	Eliminated by California in the East Regional
1993	0–2	.000	Eliminated by St. John's in the West Regional
2004	0–2	.000	Eliminated by Virginia in the Charlottesville Regional
2009	0–2	.000	Eliminated by Binghamton in the Greenville Regional
2014	0–2	.000	Eliminated by Texas A&M in the Houston Regional
2023	2–2	.500	Eliminated by Wake Forest in the Winston-Salem Regional
Totals	3–16	.158	

== Notable players ==
- Justin Bour, 1B
- Shawn Camp, RP
- Mike Colangelo, OF
- Jake Kalish, RP
- Chris O'Grady, RP
- Chris Widger, C
- Logan Driscoll, C
- Tyler Zombro, RP
- James Quinn-Irons, OF

== See also ==
- List of NCAA Division I baseball programs
