= UNC Wilmington Seahawks baseball =

UNC Wilmington Seahawks
- 2026 UNC Wilmington Seahawks baseball team
- Founded: 1957
- University: University of North Carolina Wilmington
- Head coach: Randy Hood (7th season)
- Conference: CAA
- Location: Wilmington, North Carolina
- Home stadium: Brooks Field (Capacity: 3,500)
- Nickname: Seahawks
- Colors: Teal, gold, and navy

NCAA tournament appearances
- 2003, 2004, 2006, 2008, 2012, 2013, 2015, 2016, 2018, 2019, 2023, 2024

Conference tournament champions
- 2004, 2006, 2012, 2015, 2018, 2019, 2023, 2024

Conference regular season champions
- 1987, 1989, 2005, 2007, 2008, 2012, 2013, 2016, 2023

For information on all University of North Carolina Wilmington sports, see UNC Wilmington Seahawks

The UNC Wilmington Seahawks baseball team is a varsity intercollegiate athletic team of the University of North Carolina Wilmington in Wilmington, North Carolina, United States. The team is a member of Coastal Athletic Association, which is part of the National Collegiate Athletic Association's Division I. UNC Wilmington's first baseball team was fielded in 1957. The team plays its home games at Brooks Field in Wilmington, North Carolina. The Seahawks are coached by Randy Hood.

== UNC Wilmington in the NCAA Tournament ==
Year	Record	Pct	Notes
2003	2–2	.500	Baton Rouge Regional
2004	2–2	.500	Kinston Regional
2006	1–2	.333	Chapel Hill Regional
2008	2–2	.500	Cary Regional
2013	1–2	.333	Charlottesville Regional
2015	2-2	.500	Baton Rouge Regional
2016	2-2	.500	Columbia Regional
2018	2-2	.500	Greenville Regional
2019	0-2	.000	Chapel Hill Regional
2023	0-2	.000	Conway Regional
2024	1-2	.333	Athens Regional
TOTALS	16–24	.400	

== Seahawks in Major League Baseball ==
Since the Major League Baseball draft began in 1965, UNC Wilmington has had 79 players selected.

== See also ==
- List of NCAA Division I baseball programs
