= James Madison Dukes baseball =

James Madison Dukes
- 2026 James Madison Dukes baseball team
- Founded: 1970
- University: James Madison University
- Athletic director: Matt Roan
- Head coach: Marlin Ikenberry (11th season)
- Conference: Sun Belt Conference
- Location: Harrisonburg, Virginia
- Home stadium: Eagle Field at Veterans Memorial Park (Capacity: 1,200)
- Nickname: Dukes
- Colors: Purple and gold

College World Series appearances
- 1983

NCAA regional champions
- 1983

NCAA tournament appearances
- Division II: 1976; Division I: 1980, 1981, 1983, 1988, 2002, 2008, 2011, 2024

Conference tournament champions
- CAA: 2008, 2011

Conference regular season champions
- CAA: 1986, 1988, 1995, 2002, 2006, 2010, 2011; ECAC South: 1980, 1981

The James Madison Dukes baseball team represents James Madison University in NCAA baseball. The "Diamond Dukes," as the team is known, have compiled a 1092-670-8 all-time record and have made the NCAA tournament eight times, most recently in 2024. The Dukes compete in the Sun Belt Conference.

== History ==
Founded in 1970, the James Madison baseball program played at Long Field at Mauck Stadium through the end of the 2009 season. In 2010 they opened play at Eagle Field at Veterans Memorial Park, the school's new baseball and softball complex. Billy Sample is JMU's most famous baseball alumnus, who played in 862 career major league games with the Texas Rangers, New York Yankees, and Atlanta Braves. In the 2006 season, JMU had the top-two home run hitters in Division I. One of them, Kellen Kulbacki, placed in the top five in all three of the triple crown categories. Kulbacki received the 2006 National Player of the Year award as a sophomore. In 2008, the Dukes won their first CAA Championship defeating Towson University qualifying the team for the 2008 NCAA Division I baseball tournament hosted by North Carolina State University in Raleigh, NC. The Dukes also won the CAA Championship in 2011 defeating Old Dominion University qualifying the team for the 2011 NCAA Division I baseball tournament. After a 13 year drought, the Dukes returned to the NCAA Tournament again in 2024, falling to host NC State in the Raleigh Regional final.

== James Madison in the NCAA Tournament ==
The NCAA Division I baseball tournament started in 1947. The Dukes have played in 8 tournaments, advancing to the College World Series in 1983.

Year	Record	Pct	Notes
1980	1–2	.333	East Regional
1981	1–2	.333	East Regional
1983	4–2	.667	College World Series 7th place, East Regional Champions
1988	0–2	.000	Atlantic Regional
2002	1–2	.333	Columbia Regional
2008	1–2	.333	Raleigh Regional
2011	2–2	.500	Chapel Hill Regional
2024	2–2	.500	Raleigh Regional
TOTALS	12–16	.429	

== Notable alumni ==
- Billy Sample (1974–1976) – former MLB outfielder for the Texas Rangers, New York Yankees, and Atlanta Braves; first MLB player from JMU
- Lorenzo Bundy (1977–1981) – former Minor League Baseball first baseman and MLB coach; current manager of the Double-A Birmingham Barons
- Dana Allison (1986–1989) – former MLB pitcher for the Oakland Athletics
- Larry Mitchell (1990–1992) – former MLB pitcher for the Philadelphia Phillies
- Mike Hubbard (1991–1992) – former MLB catcher for the Chicago Cubs, Montreal Expos, Atlanta Braves, and Texas Rangers
- Rich Croushore (1992–1993) – former MLB relief pitcher for the St. Louis Cardinals, Colorado Rockies, and Boston Red Sox
- Scott Forster (1992–1994) – former MLB pitcher for the Montreal Expos
- Mike Venafro (1992–1995) – former MLB relief pitcher for the Texas Rangers, Oakland Athletics, Tampa Bay Devil Rays, Los Angeles Dodgers, and Colorado Rockies
- Brian McNichol (1993–1995) – former MLB pitcher for the Chicago Cubs
- Travis Harper (1995–1997) – former MLB pitcher for the Tampa Bay Devil Rays
- Rich Thompson (1998–2000) – former MLB outfielder for the Kansas City Royals and Tampa Bay Rays
- Dan Meyer (2000–2002) – former MLB pitcher for the Atlanta Braves, Oakland Athletics, and Florida Marlins; current pitching coach for the Triple–A Indianapolis Indians
- Ryan Reid (2004–2006) – former MLB pitcher for the Pittsburgh Pirates
- Kellen Kulbacki (2005–2007) – former Minor League Baseball outfielder in the San Diego Padres organization; College Baseball Player of the Year in 2006
- Kevin Munson (2008–2010) – former Minor League Baseball pitcher in the Arizona Diamondbacks organization; Rule 5 draft pick by the Philadelphia Phillies in 2013
- Jake Lowery (2009–2011) – Johnny Bench Award winner for JMU in 2011 and former Minor League Baseball catcher; current manager for the Low–A Fredericksburg Nationals
- Kevin Kelly (2017–2019) – MLB pitcher for the Tampa Bay Rays.
- Nick Robertson (2018–2019) – MLB pitcher for the Los Angeles Dodgers
- Chase DeLauter (2020–2022) – outfielder who was a first–round draft pick by the Cleveland Guardians
