= Shawn Stiffler =

American college baseball coach and former pitcher

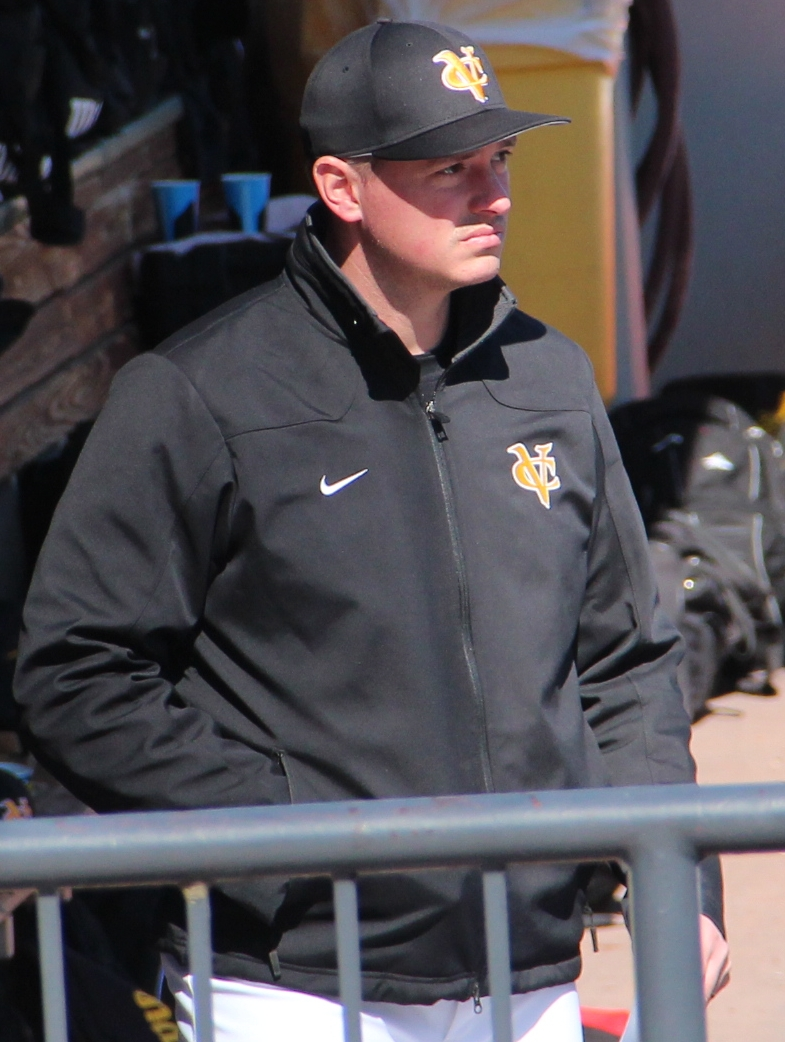
- Stiffler in 2014

Current position
- Title: Head coach
- Team: Notre Dame
- Conference: ACC
- Record: 120–92

Biographical details
- Born: April 2, 1979 (age 47)

Playing career
- 1998–2001: George Mason
- Position: Pitcher

Coaching career (HC unless noted)
- 2002–2006: George Mason (asst.)
- 2007–2012: VCU (asst.)
- 2012–2022: VCU
- 2023–present: Notre Dame

Head coaching record
- Overall: 472–299
- Tournaments: NCAA: 6–7

Accomplishments and honors

Championships
- NCAA Regional: 2015; 3× A-10 regular season: 2017, 2019, 2021; 4× A-10 Tournament: 2015, 2019, 2021, 2022

Awards
- A-10 Coach of the Year: 2019

Shawn Michael Stiffler (born April 2, 1979) is an American college baseball coach and former pitcher, who is the head coach of the Notre Dame Fighting Irish. He played college baseball for the George Mason Patriots from 1998 to 2001 under head coach Bill Brown. Stiffler had been a part of the Rams baseball program since 2007, where he spent the first 5 seasons as an assistant to Paul Keyes.

== Playing career ==
Stiffler played high school baseball from 1994–1997 at Somerset Area High School, in Somerset, Pennsylvania where he earned All-American honors as a pitcher. He was drafted in the 53rd round by the Minnesota Twins in the 1997 MLB draft, but elected instead to continue his baseball career at the collegiate level, joining the George Mason Patriots baseball team.

== Coaching career ==
Immediately following his career with George Mason, Stiffler was picked up as an assistant for the George Mason Patriots baseball program. He worked the first two years as the number two assistant before being promoted to the head assistant for the 2004 season. Stiffler was hired as the Virginia Commonwealth's (VCU) pitching coach and recruiting coordinator. As a recruiter for VCU, Stiffler recruited 15 eventual Major League Baseball draft picks. He would serve the role as a recruiter and pitching coach until 2007, where he was promoted to an assistant. In Stiffler's first season as an assistant, the Rams would boast one of their strongest campaigns in program history, winning 27 games and the 2007 CAA tournament.

On April 11, 2012, Stiffler was named the head coach on an interim basis when Paul Keyes stepped down to health reasons. Stiffler finished the 2012 season out with a 12–9 record, and in December 2012 was promoted to head coach on a full-time basis.

In 2015, Stiffler led his team to the best season in school history. The Rams finished 40–25 overall with Stiffler leading the team to their first NCAA Division I Super Regional appearance, being recognized by both the NCBWA and Collegiate Baseball Coach of the Year.

On July 12, 2022, it was reported that Shawn Stiffler is being hired to be the next head baseball coach at the University of Notre Dame.

=== Heading coaching record ===
Below is a table of Stiffler's yearly records as an NCAA head baseball coach.

Record table
Season	Team	Overall	Conference	Standing	Postseason
VCU Rams (Colonial Athletic Association) (2012)
2012	VCU	12–9 (Note: Took over on an interim basis during the 2012 season.)	8–9	5th	CAA tournament (Note: 6 of the CAA's 11 teams qualified for the tournament.)
VCU Rams (Atlantic 10 Conference) (2013–2022)
2013	VCU	28–26	12–12	t-8th	
2014	VCU	37–20	15–10	4th	Atlantic 10 tournament
2015	VCU	40–25	14–10	t-4th	NCAA Super Regional
2016	VCU	38–19	17-9	2nd	Atlantic 10 tournament
2017	VCU	35–22	21-7	1st	Atlantic 10 tournament
2018	VCU	34–23	14-10	t-5th	Atlantic 10 tournament
2019	VCU	39–19	19–5	1st	Atlantic 10 tournament
2020	VCU	9–8	0–0		Season canceled due to COVID-19
2021	VCU	38–16	13–3	1st (South)	NCAA Regional
2022	VCU	42–20	19–5	2nd	NCAA Regional
VCU:		352–207	152–80		
Notre Dame Fighting Irish (Atlantic Coast Conference) (2023–present)
2023	Notre Dame	30–24	15–15	4th (Atlantic)	
2024	Notre Dame	27–25	9–21	6th (Atlantic)	
2025	Notre Dame	32–21	14–16	11th	ACC Tournament
2026	Notre Dame	31–22	13–17	T–10th	ACC Tournament
Notre Dame:		120–92	51–69		
Total:		472–299			
National champion Postseason invitational champion Conference regular season champion Conference regular season and conference tournament champion Division regular season champion Division regular season and conference tournament champion Conference tournament champion

== See also ==
- List of current NCAA Division I baseball coaches
