= 2013 Colonial Athletic Association baseball tournament =

American college baseball tournament

- Teams: 6
- Format: Double-elimination tournament
- Finals site: Eagle Field at Veterans Memorial Park; Harrisonburg, VA
- Champions: Towson (1st title)
- Winning coach: Mike Gottlieb (1st title)
- MVP: Zach Fisher (Towson)

2013 Colonial Athletic Association baseball standings
	Conf.				Overall
Team	W		L	PCT	W		L	PCT
UNC Wilmington ‍†‍‍^{y}	18	–	8	.692	38	–	23	.623
William & Mary ‍‍‍^{y}	17	–	10	.630	39	–	24	.619
Delaware ‍‍‍	15	–	12	.556	33	–	22	.600
Old Dominion ‍‍‍	15	–	12	.556	30	–	24	.556
Georgia State ‍‍‍	14	–	13	.519	35	–	21	.625
Towson ‍‍‡‍^{y}	14	–	13	.519	30	–	30	.500
Northeastern ‍‍‍	12	–	15	.444	31	–	26	.544
James Madison ‍‍‍	11	–	15	.423	25	–	30	.455
Hofstra ‍‍‍	11	–	16	.407	26	–	27	.491
George Mason ‍‍‍	7	–	20	.259	18	–	35	.340
† – Conference champion ‡ – Tournament champion y – Invited to the NCAA tournament As of June 30, 2013; Rankings from Collegiate Baseball

The 2013 Colonial Athletic Association baseball tournament was held at Eagle Field at Veterans Memorial Park in Harrisonburg, Virginia, from May 22 through 25. In the championship game, fourth-seeded Towson defeated second-seeded William & Mary, 5–2, to win its first tournament championship. As a result, Towson earned the Colonial Athletic Association's automatic bid to the 2013 NCAA Division I baseball tournament.

== Seeding and format ==
Continuing the format adopted in 2012, the top six finishers from the regular season competed in the double-elimination tournament. The top two seeds received a single bye to the second round. Due to their planned departure from the CAA after this season, Old Dominion and Georgia State were not eligible for the tournament.

Team	W	L	Pct.	GB	Seed
UNC Wilmington	18	8	.692	–	1
William & Mary	17	10	.630	1.5	2
Delaware	15	12	.556	3.5	3
Old Dominion	15	12	.556	3.5	–
Georgia State	14	13	.519	4.5	–
Towson	14	13	.519	4.5	4
Northeastern	12	15	.444	6.5	5
James Madison	11	15	.423	7	6
Hofstra	11	16	.407	7.5	–
George Mason	7	20	.259	11.5	–

== Bracket ==
Upper round 1	Upper round 2	Upper final	Final
1	UNC Wilmington	11
4	Towson	9	4	Towson	13
5	Northeastern	8	4	Towson	20
2	William & Mary	13
2	William & Mary	20
3	Delaware	6	6	James Madison	19
6	James Madison	9
4	Towson	5	—
2	William & Mary	2	—
Lower round 1	Lower round 2	Lower round 3	Lower final
2	William & Mary	12
1	UNC Wilmington	4	5	Northeastern	4
6	James Madison	7	5	Northeastern	5
5	Northeastern	7	5	Northeastern	11
3	Delaware	6

== All-Tournament Team ==
The following players were named to the All-Tournament Team.

Name	School
Zach Fisher	Towson
Mike Volpe	Towson
Kurt Wertz	Towson
Dominic Fratantuono	Towson
Andrew Parker	Towson
Ryan Lindemuth	William & Mary
Jonathan Sarty	William & Mary
Michael Katz	William & Mary
William Shaw	William & Mary
Jason Vosler	Northeastern
Jordan Ramsey	UNC Wilmington
Cole McInturff	James Madison

=== Most Valuable Player ===
Towson's Zach Fisher was named the tournament's Most Valuable Player. In the tournament, Fisher batted .476 with three home runs and 10 RBI.
