= 2013 Georgia State Panthers baseball team =

American college baseball season

2013 Georgia State Panthers baseball
- Conference: Colonial Athletic Association
- Record: 35-21 (14-13 CAA)
- Head coach: Greg Frady (6th season)
- Home stadium: GSU Baseball Complex

2013 Colonial Athletic Association baseball standings
	Conf.				Overall
Team	W		L	PCT	W		L	PCT
UNC Wilmington ‍†‍‍^{y}	18	–	8	.692	38	–	23	.623
William & Mary ‍‍‍^{y}	17	–	10	.630	39	–	24	.619
Delaware ‍‍‍	15	–	12	.556	33	–	22	.600
Old Dominion ‍‍‍	15	–	12	.556	30	–	24	.556
Georgia State ‍‍‍	14	–	13	.519	35	–	21	.625
Towson ‍‍‡‍^{y}	14	–	13	.519	30	–	30	.500
Northeastern ‍‍‍	12	–	15	.444	31	–	26	.544
James Madison ‍‍‍	11	–	15	.423	25	–	30	.455
Hofstra ‍‍‍	11	–	16	.407	26	–	27	.491
George Mason ‍‍‍	7	–	20	.259	18	–	35	.340
† – Conference champion ‡ – Tournament champion y – Invited to the NCAA tournament As of June 30, 2013; Rankings from Collegiate Baseball

The 2013 Georgia State Panthers baseball team represented Georgia State University in the 2013 NCAA Division I baseball season. The Panthers played their home games at the GSU Baseball Complex. The 2013 season represented Georgia States final season in the Colonial Athletic Association before leaving to join the Sun Belt Conference. Because of their planned move, the CAA would not allow Georgia State to compete in the end of season tournament.

== Personnel ==
=== 2013 Roster ===
2012 Georgia State Panthers roster
Pitchers: 20 Nathan Bates - Freshman; 45 Jason Boulais - Junior; 35 Hunter Cash - (redshirt) Junior; 19 McCauley Bryant - Freshman; 21 Ben Burns - Junior; 12 Brantley Burton - Freshman; 33 Andrew Fessler - Junior; 11 Aiden McLaughlin - (redshirt) Junior; 13 Garrett Ford - Freshman; 2 Michael Lelko - Freshman; 18 Connor Stanley - Sophomore; 17 Jerry Stuckey - Sophomore; 15 Matt McCloskey - Freshman; 16 Nick Squeglia - (redshirt) Senior; 18 Conner Stanley - Sophomore; 17 Jerry Stuckey - Sophomore; 5 Matt Rose - Freshman	Catchers: 26 Landon Anderson - Senior; 27 Scott Sarratt - Senior; 8 Joey Roach - Freshman; Infielders: 7 Caden Bailey - Sophomore; 34 Greg Bowder - Senior; 29 Alex Prescott - Sophomore; 4 James Clements - Freshman; 3 Drew Shields - Senior; 22 Nic Wilson - Junior	Outfielders: 1 Shane Gordon - Freshman; 28 Mark Hogan - (redshirt) Senior; 23 Josh Merrigan - Freshman; 32 Chase Raffield - Junior; 6 Chris Triplett - Junior

Baseball - 2013 Roster

=== Coaching staff ===
2013 Georgia State Panthers baseball coaching staff
- 10 Greg Frady – Head coach - 6th year
- 48 Edwin Thompson – Assistant coach - 1st year
- 25 Willie Stewart – Assistant coach - 2nd year

== Schedule ==
2013 Georgia State Panthers baseball game log
Regular season
February

#	Date	Opponent	Venue	Score	Overall Record	CAA Record
1	February 15	Butler	GSU Baseball Complex	12-7	1-0	-
2	February 16	Butler	GSU Baseball Complex	17-9	2-0	-
3	February 17	Butler	GSU Baseball Complex	10-8	2-1	-
4	February 19	Georgia Tech	Russ Chandler Stadium	5-16	2-2	-
5	February 20	Alabama A&M	GSU Baseball Complex	20-0	3-2	-
6	February 22	Grambling State	GSU Baseball Complex	8-7	4-2	-
7	February 23	Grambling State	GSU Baseball Complex	4-9	4-3	-
8	February 24	Grambling State	GSU Baseball Complex	7-17	4-4	-
9	February 26	Georgia	GSU Baseball Complex	10-7	5-4	-

March

#	Date	Opponent	Venue	Score	Overall Record	CAA Record
10	March 1	Boston College	St. Petersburg, FL	5-4	6-4	-
11	March 2	Boston College	St. Petersburg, FL	0-2	6-5	-
12	March 3	Boston College	St. Petersburg, FL	7-6	7-5	-
13	March 5	UNC Ashville	GSU Baseball Complex	12-3	8-5	-
14	March 6	UNC Asheville	GSU Baseball Complex	13-5	9-5	-
15	March 8	George Mason	GSU Baseball Complex	13-14	9-6	0-1
16	March 9	George Mason	GSU Baseball Complex	12-3	10-6	1-1
17	March 10	George Mason	GSU Baseball Complex	8-7	11-6	2-1
-	March 13	Kennesaw State	Fred Stillwell Stadium	cancelled	-	-
18	March 15	Old Dominion	GSU Baseball Complex	13-8	12-6	3-1
19	March 16	Old Dominion	GSU Baseball Complex	12-10	13-6	4-1
20	March 17	Old Dominion	GSU Baseball Complex	7-4	14-6	5-1
21	March 19	Mercer	GSU Baseball Complex	4-9	14-7	5-1
22	March 20	Mercer	Claude Smith Field	13-7	15-7	5-1
23	March 22	UNC Wilmington	Brooks Field	0-9	15-8	5-2
24	March 23	UNC Wilmington	Brooks Field	1-12	15-9	5-3
25	March 24	UNC Wilmington	Brooks Field	11-12	15-10	5-4
26	March 27	Alabama State	GSU Baseball Complex	14-1	16-10	5-4
27	March 29	Delaware	Bob Hannah Stadium	2-7	16-11	5-5
28	March 30	Delaware	Bob Hannah Stadium	7-8 (10)	16-12	5-6
29	March 30	Delaware	Bob Hannah Stadium	2-4	16-13	5-7

April

#	Date	Opponent	Venue	Score	Overall Record	CAA Record
-	April 3	Alabama State	Wheeler–Watkins Baseball Complex	Cancelled	-	-
30	April 5	Fordham	GSU Baseball Complex	12-9	17-13	5-7
31	April 6	Fordham	GSU Baseball Complex	9-3	18-13	5-7
32	April 6	Fordham	GSU Baseball Complex	5-3	19-13	5-7
33	April 7	Fordham	GSU Baseball Complex	5-2	20-13	5-7
34	April 9	Kennesaw State	GSU Baseball Complex	12-5	21-13	5-7
35	April 12	New Orleans	Maestri Field	4-3	22-13	5-7
36	April 13	New Orleans	Maestri Field	5-4	23-13	5-7
37	April 13	New Orleans	Maestri Field	6-5	24-13	5-7
38	April 14	New Orleans	Maestri Field	2-3	24-14	5-7
39	April 16	Kennesaw State	Fred Stillwell Stadium	3-2	25-14	5-7
40	April 19	James Madison	Eagle Field at Veterans Memorial Park	14-12	26-14	6-7
40	April 20	James Madison	Eagle Field at Veterans Memorial Park	8-9	26-15	6-8
41	April 21	James Madison	Eagle Field at Veterans Memorial Park	5-8	26-16	6-9
42	April 23	Savannah State	GSU Baseball Complex	11-2	27-16	6-9
43	April 26	Northeastern	Parsons Field	5-6	27-17	6-10
44	April 27	Northeastern	Parsons Field	6-0	28-17	7-10
45	April 28	Northeastern	Parsons Field	2-1	29-17	8-10

May

#	Date	Opponent	Venue	Score	Overall Record	CAA Record
46	May 3	Towson	GSU Baseball Complex	12-11	30-17	9-10
47	May 4	Towson	GSU Baseball Complex	6-4	31-17	10-10
48	May 5	Towson	GSU Baseball Complex	8-3	32-17	11-10
49	May 8	Kennesaw State	GSU Baseball Complex	6-5	32-18	11-10
50	May 10	Hofstra	GSU Baseball Complex	10-3	33-18	12-10
51	May 11	Hofstra	GSU Baseball Complex	9-12	33-19	12-11
52	May 12	Hofstra	GSU Baseball Complex	6-3	34-19	13-11
53	May 16	William and Mary	Williamsburg, VA	3-15	34-20	13-12
54	May 17	William and Mary	Williamsburg, VA	12-4	35-20	14-12
55	May 17	William and Mary	Williamsburg, VA	0-14	35-21	14-13
