= 2012 VCU Rams baseball team =

American college baseball season

2012 VCU Rams baseball
- Conference: Colonial Athletic Association
- Record: 20–17 (7–11 CAA)
- Head coach: Paul Keyes (18th season)
- Assistant coaches: Shawn Stiffler (6th season); Jeff Palumbo (1st season)
- Hitting coach: C.J. Rhodes (2nd season)
- Home stadium: The Diamond

2012 Colonial Athletic Association baseball standings
	Conf.						Overall
Team	W		L		T	PCT	W		L		T	PCT
UNC Wilmington ‍†‍‡‍^{y}	24	–	6	–	0	.800	39	–	23	–	0	.629
Hofstra ‍‍‍	20	–	10	–	0	.667	34	–	22	–	0	.607
Delaware ‍‍‍	17	–	13	–	0	.567	31	–	27	–	0	.534
George Mason ‍‍‍	16	–	14	–	0	.533	33	–	24	–	0	.579
VCU ‍‍‍	15	–	15	–	0	.500	34	–	25	–	0	.576
Towson ‍‍‍	15	–	15	–	0	.500	27	–	31	–	0	.466
Georgia State ‍‍‍	14	–	16	–	0	.467	24	–	31	–	0	.436
Northeastern ‍‍‍	13	–	17	–	0	.433	23	–	28	–	0	.451
William & Mary ‍‍‍	12	–	18	–	0	.400	31	–	25	–	0	.554
James Madison ‍‍‍	10	–	20	–	0	.333	16	–	35	–	2	.321
Old Dominion ‍‍‍	9	–	21	–	0	.300	19	–	34	–	0	.358
† – Conference champion ‡ – Tournament champion y – Invited to the NCAA tournament As of June 30, 2012; Rankings from Collegiate Baseball

The 2012 VCU Rams baseball team represented Virginia Commonwealth University in the 2012 NCAA Division I baseball season. The Rams played their home games at The Diamond northwest of downtown Richmond, Virginia.

== Personnel ==
=== Roster ===
2012 VCU Rams baseball team
Players
Coaches

#	Pos.	Name	B/T	Height	Weight	Year	Home town
1	OF	Paul Nice	R/R	5 ft 11 in (1.8 m)	187 lb (85 kg)	Sr	Powhatan, VA
2	OF	Bill Cullen	L/L	5 ft 9 in (1.75 m)	165 lb (75 kg)	So	Colonial Heights, VA
3	OF	Landon Prentiss	R/R	6 ft 0 in (1.83 m)	180 lb (82 kg)	So	Richmond, VA
4	INF	Joey Cujas	R/R	6 ft 0 in (1.83 m)	180 lb (82 kg)	So	Midlothian, VA
7	C	Chris Ayers	R/R	5 ft 11 in (1.8 m)	185 lb (84 kg)	So	Manchester, VA
8	RHP	Josh Alford	R/R	6 ft 0 in (1.83 m)	180 lb (82 kg)	Sr	Midlothian, VA
9	INF	Jordan Weymouth	L/R	5 ft 11 in (1.8 m)	180 lb (82 kg)	Jr	Paradise Valley, AZ
11	INF	Nick Kime	R/R	5 ft 11 in (1.8 m)	180 lb (82 kg)	Jr	Stafford, VA
12	INF	Robert Malan	R/R	6 ft 0 in (1.83 m)	175 lb (79 kg)	RS So	Ashburn, VA
13	LHP	Matt Lees	L/L	6 ft 1 in (1.85 m)	170 lb (77 kg)	Fr	Short Pump, VA
16	C	Zac Bellinger	L/R	6 ft 1 in (1.85 m)	215 lb (98 kg)	Fr	Elmira, NY
17	LHP	Ryan Farrar	L/L	6 ft 2 in (1.88 m)	175 lb (79 kg)	Jr	Mechanicsville, VA
18	RHP	Chris Shaklee	R/R	5 ft 8 in (1.73 m)	172 lb (78 kg)	Sr	Woodbridge, VA
19	RHP	Ryan Klem	R/R	5 ft 10 in (1.78 m)	170 lb (77 kg)	Jr	Chandler, AZ
20	RHP	Seth Greene	R/R	6 ft 3 in (1.91 m)	170 lb (77 kg)	RS So	Short Pump, VA
21	RHP	Seth Cutler-Voltz	R/R	6 ft 0 in (1.83 m)	180 lb (82 kg)	Sr	Richmond, VA
22	C	Kyle Sutherland	L/R	6 ft 2 in (1.88 m)	205 lb (93 kg)	Sr	Issaquah, WA
23	RHP	Ryan Morrison	R/R	6 ft 5 in (1.96 m)	200 lb (91 kg)	So	Midlothian, VA
24	OF	Taylor Buran	R/R	6 ft 4 in (1.93 m)	220 lb (100 kg)	RS Jr	Richmond, VA
25	INF	Vimael Machin	L/R	5 ft 10 in (1.78 m)	175 lb (79 kg)	Fr	San Lorenzo, PR
26	UTL	Taylor Perkins	R/R	6 ft 0 in (1.83 m)	205 lb (93 kg)	Sr	Dinwiddie, VA
27	INF	Brent Mikionis	R/R	6 ft 5 in (1.96 m)	230 lb (104 kg)	RS Jr	Powhatan, VA
28	C	Nick Abrahamson	R/R	5 ft 11 in (1.8 m)	210 lb (95 kg)	Sr	Midlothian, VA
30	RHP	Kyle Haynes	R/R	6 ft 2 in (1.88 m)	195 lb (88 kg)	Jr	Stafford, VA
31	RHP	Blake Hauser	R/R	6 ft 2 in (1.88 m)	175 lb (79 kg)	Jr	Chesterfield, VA
32	LHP	Michael Graham	R/L	6 ft 7 in (2.01 m)	210 lb (95 kg)	RS Sr	Fairfax Station, VA
33	RHP	Kyle Pelchy	R/R	6 ft 2 in (1.88 m)	190 lb (86 kg)	Sr	Yorktown, VA
35	LHP	Heath Dwyer	L/L	6 ft 3 in (1.91 m)	200 lb (91 kg)	Fr	Chandler, AZ
36	LHP	Brennan Huelse	L/L	6 ft 3 in (1.91 m)	195 lb (88 kg)	Jr	Stafford, VA
38	RHP	Jordan Storey	R/R	6 ft 4 in (1.93 m)	225 lb (102 kg)		Andover, KS

Head coach

Paul Keyes

Assistant coach(es)

Shawn Stiffler
Jeff Palumbo
C. J. Rhodes

Legend

- (C) Team captain
- (S) Suspended
- (I) Ineligible
- Injured
- Current redshirt

Roster
Last update: March 8, 2012

== Schedule ==
2012 VCU Rams game log (34–25)
Regular Season: 32–23 (Home: 18–11; Away: 14–12)

February: 5–4 (Home: 4–0; Away: 1–4)
Game	Date	Rank	Opponent	Stadium	Score	Win	Loss	Save	Attendance	Overall	CAA
1	February 17		at Long Beach State*	Blair Field; Long Beach, California	**W** 5–4	**Alford (1–0)**	Magallon (0–1)	**Hauser (1)**	1,200	1–0	—
2	February 18		at Long Beach State*	Blair Field	**L** 6–7	Frye (1–0)	**Lees (0–1)**	None	899	1–1	—
3	February 19		at Long Beach State*	Blair Field	**L** 2–3	Strufing (1–0)	**Pelchy (0–1)**	Hunt (1)	862	1–2	—
4	February 21		at Pepperdine*	Eddy D. Field Stadium; Malibu, California	**L** 1–6	Miller (1–0)	**Cutler–Voltz (0–1)**	—	156	1–3	—
5	February 22		at Pepperdine*	Eddy D. Field Stadium	**L** 2–11	Maurer (1–0)	**Morrison (0–1)**	—	161	1–4	—
6	February 24		Binghamton*	The Diamond; Richmond, Virginia	**W** 5–1	**Haynes (1–0)**	Augliera (0–1)	None	185	2–4	—
7	February 25		Binghamton*	The Diamond	**W** 5-1	**Farrar (1–0)**	Lynch (0–1)	**Hauser (2)**	294	3–4	—
8	February 26		Binghamton*	The Diamond	**W** 12-3	**Pelchy (1–1)**	Lambert (0–1)	None	307	4–4	—
9	February 28		Norfolk State*	The Diamond	**W** 4–3	**Cutler–Voltz (1–1)**	Vanassche (0–2)	**Hauser (3)**	173	5–4	—

March: 10–8 (Home: 6–4; Away: 4–4)
Game	Date	Rank	Opponent	Stadium	Score	Win	Loss	Save	Attendance	Overall	CAA	Ref.
10	March 3		Monmouth*	The Diamond	**L** 4–6	Light (2–1)	**Haynes (1–1)**	McGee (1)	231	5–5	—	
11	March 4 (DH)		Monmouth*	The Diamond	**W** 8–0	**Farrar (2–0)**	Smith (1–2)	None	214	6–5	—	
12	March 4 (DH)		Monmouth*	The Diamond	**W** 5–3	**Pelchy (2–1)**	Frey (1–1)	**Hauser (4)**	214	7–5	—	
13	March 6		Temple*	The Diamond	**W** 6–3	**Dwyer** (1–0)	Moller (0–1)	**Hauser (5)**	138	8–5	—	
14	March 9		Towson	The Diamond	**W** 6–3	'**Haynes** (2–1)	Cioffi (0–1)	**Hauser (6)**		9–5	1–0	
15	March 10		Towson	The Diamond	**L** 2–3					9–6	1–1	
16	March 11		Towson	The Diamond	**W** 9–8					10–6	2–1	
17	March 13		at No. 25 East Carolina*	Clark–LeClair Stadium; Greenville, North Carolina	**W** 18–11					11–6	—	
18	March 16		at Hofstra	University Field; Hempstead, New York	**L** 4–7					11–7	2–2	
19	March 17		at Hofstra	University Field	**L** 4–13					11–8	2–3	
20	March 18		at Hofstra	University Field	**L** 5–12					11–9	2–4	
21	March 21		at Richmond*	Malcolm U. Pitt Field; Tuckahoe, Virginia	**L** 1–7					11–10	—	
22	March 23		UNCW	The Diamond	**L** 6–9					11–11	2–5	
23	March 24		UNCW	The Diamond	**W** 5–4					12–11	3–5	
24	March 25		UNCW	The Diamond	**L** 0–4					12–12	3–6	
25	March 27		at Liberty*	Al Worthington Stadium; Lynchburg, Virginia	**W** 4–2					13–12	—	
26	March 30		at Northeastern	Parsons Field; Boston, Massachusetts	**W** 6–2					14–12	4–6	
27	March 31		at Northeastern	Parsons Field	**W** 8–2					15–12	5–6	

April: x–x (Home: x–x; Away: x–x)
Game	Date	Rank	Opponent	Stadium	Score	Win	Loss	Save	Attendance	Overall	CAA
28	April 1		at Northeastern	Parsons Field	**W** 10–3					16–12	6–6
29	April 4		Liberty*	The Diamond	**W** 5–4					17–12	—
30	April 6		George Mason	The Diamond	**L** 4–7					17–13	6–7
31	April 7		George Mason	The Diamond	**L** 0–2					17–14	6–8
32	April 8		George Mason	The Diamond	**L** 2–4					17–15	6–9
33	April 10		VMI	The Diamond	**W** 18–1					18–15	—
34	April 13		at Delaware	Bob Hannah Stadium; Newark, Delaware	**L** 1–10					18–16	6–9
35	April 14		at Delaware	Bob Hannah Stadium	**W** 11–4					19–16	7–10
36	April 15		at Delaware	Bob Hannah Stadium	**L** 2–6					19–17	7–11
37	April 17		at Longwood*	Bolding Stadium; Farmville, Virginia	**W** 9–0					20–17	—
38	April 20		William & Mary	The Diamond	**L** 3–4					20–18	7–12
39	April 21		William & Mary	The Diamond	**W** 7–4					21–18	8–12
40	April 22		William & Mary	The Diamond	**W** 5–4					22–18	9–12
41	April 27		at Old Dominion	Bud Metheny Baseball Complex; Norfolk, Virginia	**L** 1–4					22–19	9–13
42	April 28		at Old Dominion	Bud Metheny Baseball Complex	**W** 7–6					23–19	10–13
43	April 29		at Old Dominion	Bud Metheny Baseball Complex	**W** 3–0					24–19	11–13

May

#	Date	Opponent	Site/stadium	Score	Win	Loss	Save	Attendance	Overall record	CAA record
44	May 1	@ VMI	Gray–Minor Stadium	6–3					25–19	–
45	May 4	Georgia State	The Diamond	4–3					26–19	12–13
46	May 5	Georgia State	The Diamond	3–12					26–20	12–14
47	May 6	Georgia State	The Diamond	6–4					27–20	13–14
48	May 8	Richmond	The Diamond	6–4					28–20	–
49	May 11	@ James Madison	Veterans Memorial Park	11–13					28–21	13–15
50	May 12	@ James Madison	Veterans Memorial Park	9–3					29–21	14–15
51	May 13	@ James Madison	Veterans Memorial Park	10–8					30–21	15–15
52	May 15	@ Virginia	Davenport Field	5–7					30–22	–
53	May 17	@ VMI	Gray–Minor Stadium	7–2					31–22	–
54	May 18	VMI	The Diamond	6–7					31–23	–
55	May 19	East Carolina	The Diamond	11–2					32–23	–

CAA Tournament

#	Date	Opponent	Site/stadium	Score	Win	Loss	Save	Attendance	Overall record	CAA record
56	May 23	vs. George Mason	Veterans Memorial Park	11–7					33–23	–
57	May 24	vs. UNC Wilmington	Veterans Memorial Park	5–8					33–24	–
58	May 25	vs. Towson	Veterans Memorial Park	14–9					34–24	–
59	May 26	vs. Hofstra	Veterans Memorial Park	2–4					34–25	–

- Win
- Loss
- Postponement
- Bold: VCU team member
- Rankings from D1 Baseball.
- (#) Tournament seedings in parentheses.
- * indicates a non-conference game.

== Rankings ==
Ranking movements Legend: ██ Increase in ranking ██ Decrease in ranking — = Not ranked RV = Received votes
	Week																		
Poll	Pre	1	2	3	4	5	6	7	8	9	10	11	12	13	14	15	16	17	Final
Coaches'	—	—*	—	—	RV	—	—	—	—	—	—	—	—	—	—	—	—	—	—
Baseball America	—	—	—	—	RV	—	—	—	—	—	—	—	—	—	—	—	—	—	—
Collegiate Baseball^	—	—	—	—	RV	RV	—	—	—	—	—	—	—	—	—	—	—	—	—
NCBWA†	RV	—	—	—	RV	RV	—	—	—	—	—	—	—	—	—	—	—	—	—

^ Collegiate Baseball ranked 40 teams in their preseason poll, but only ranked 30 teams weekly during the season.
† NCBWA ranks 30 teams in their preseason poll, but only ranks 25 teams weekly during the season.
* A new poll was not released for this week, so for comparison purposes, the previous week's ranking is inserted in this week's slot.
