= 2020 Davidson Wildcats baseball team =

American college baseball season

2020 Davidson Wildcats baseball
- Conference: Atlantic 10 Conference
- Record: 13–3 (0–0 A-10)
- Head coach: Rucker Taylor (2nd season)
- Assistant coaches: Ryan Munger (7th season); Parker Bangs (2nd season); Blake Butler (1st season)
- Home stadium: T. Henry Wilson Jr. Field

2020 Atlantic 10 Conference baseball standings
	Conf.				Overall
Team	W		L	PCT	W		L	PCT
Davidson ‍‍‍	0	–	0	–	13	–	3	.813
Saint Louis ‍‍‍	0	–	0	–	10	–	6	.625
Fordham ‍‍‍	0	–	0	–	10	–	6	.625
Rhode Island ‍‍‍	0	–	0	–	8	–	5	.615
VCU ‍‍‍	0	–	0	–	9	–	8	.529
George Washington ‍‍‍	0	–	0	–	8	–	8	.500
Dayton ‍‍‍	0	–	0	–	6	–	8	.429
St. Bonaventure ‍‍‍	0	–	0	–	3	–	4	.429
La Salle ‍‍‍	0	–	0	–	5	–	9	.357
Saint Joseph's ‍‍‍	0	–	0	–	5	–	10	.333
Richmond ‍‍‍	0	–	0	–	5	–	12	.294
UMass ‍‍‍	0	–	0	–	1	–	8	.111
George Mason ‍‍‍	0	–	0	–	1	–	14	.067
† – Conference champion ‡ – Tournament champion y – Invited to the NCAA tournament As of March 12, 2020; Rankings from D1Baseball

The 2020 Davidson Wildcats baseball team represented Davidson College during the 2020 NCAA Division I baseball season. It was the program's 119th baseball season, and their 5th season the Atlantic 10 Conference. The regular season began on February 15, 2020 and prematurely concluded on March 12, 2020 due to the COVID-19 pandemic.

== Preseason ==
=== A10 media poll ===
The Atlantic 10 baseball media poll was released on February 10, 2020. Davidson was picked to finish 5th in the Atlantic 10.

Coaches' Poll
Predicted finish	Team	Points
1	VCU	162 (8)
2	Fordham	149 (2)
3	Dayton	144 (3)
4	Richmond	123
5	Davidson	112
6	Saint Louis	111
7	Rhode Island	97
8	George Washington	73
9	Saint Joseph's	71
10	George Mason	52
11	UMass	37
12	La Salle	31
13	St. Bonaventure	21

== Game log ==
2020 Davidson Wildcats baseball game log
Regular season

February
Date	Opponent	Rank	Stadium Site	Score	Win	Loss	Save	Attendance	Overall Record	A10 Record
February 15	Lehigh*		Wilson Field; Davidson, NC	**W** 5–4	**G. Levy** (1–0)	M. Black (0–1)	**J. Peaden (1)**	407	1–0	–
February 15^{DH}	Lehigh*		Wilson Field	**W** 10–2	**B. Hely** (1–0)	L. Rettig (0–1)	**N. Devos (1)**	406	2–0	–
February 16	Lehigh*		Wilson Field	**W** 10–3	**J. Peaden** (1–0)	C. Torres (0–1)	None	237	3–0	–
February 19	North Carolina Central*		Wilson Field	**W** 7–3	**J. Walker** (1–0)	A. Sniffen (0–2)	**B. Flynn (1)**	111	4–0	–
February 21	Georgetown*		Wilson Field	**W** 5–0	**G. Levy** (2–0)	C. Bosch (1–1)	**J. Peaden** (2)	237	5–0	–
February 22	Georgetown*		Wilson Field	**W** 5–4	**J. Biederman** (1–0)	C. Walter (0–2)	None	336	6–0	–
February 23	Georgetown*		Wilson Field	**W** 10–2	**A. Fenton** (1–0)	A. Redfern (0–1)	None	413	7–0	–
February 26	Winthrop*		Wilson Field	**L** 3–10	B. Petta (1–0)	**W. Imwalle (0–1)**	None	189	7–1	–
February 28	Lafayette*		Wilson Field	**L** 2–8	J. Woodward (2–1)	**G. Levy (2–1)**	J. Ciccone (1)	207	7–2	–
February 29	Lafayette*		Wilson Field	**W** 16–0	**B. Hely** (2–0)	K. Subers (0–2)	None	236	8–2	–

March
Date	Opponent	Rank	Stadium Site	Score	Win	Loss	Save	Attendance	Overall Record	A10 Record
March 1	Lafayette*		Wilson Field	**W** 7–5	**A. Fenton** (2–0)	B. Kreyer (0–2)	**B. Flynn (2)**	278	9–2	–
March 3	at Charleston Southern*		CSU Ballpark; North Charleston, SC	**L** 1–3	H. Tucker (1–0)	**J. Biederman (1–1)**	T. Seibert (1)	87	9–3	–
March 4	at Charleston Southern*		CSU Ballpark	Cancelled (inclement weather)					9–3	–
March 7	Siena*		Wilson Field	**W** 2–0	**G. Levy** (3–1)	B. Seiler (0–3)	**B. Flynn (3)**	377	10–3	–
March 7^{DH}	Siena*		Wilson Field	**W** 6–1	**B. Hely** (3–0)	J. Lumpinski (0–4)	**N. Devos (2)**	246	11–3	–
March 8	Siena*		Wilson Field	**W** 12–7	**A. Fenton** (3–0)	J. Flood (0–1)	**B. Flynn (4)**	316	12–3	–
March 10	vs. No. 10 Duke*		BB&T Ballpark; Charlotte, NC	**W** 7–6	**N. Devos** (1–0)	T. Girard (1–1)	None	1,618	13–3	–
March 13	North Carolina A&T*		Wilson Field	Cancelled (COVID-19 concerns)						
March 14	at North Carolina A&T*		World War Memorial Stadium; Greensboro, NC	Cancelled (COVID-19 concerns)						
March 15	at North Carolina A&T*		World War Memorial Stadium	Cancelled (COVID-19 concerns)						
March 20	UMass		Wilson Field	Cancelled (COVID-19 concerns)						
March 21	UMass		Wilson Field	Cancelled (COVID-19 concerns)						
March 22	UMass		Wilson Field	Cancelled (COVID-19 concerns)						
March 24	at USC Upstate*		Harley Park; Spartanburg, SC	Cancelled (COVID-19 concerns)						
March 27	at Dayton		Woerner Field; Dayton, OH	Cancelled (COVID-19 concerns)						
March 28	at Dayton		Woerner Field	Cancelled (COVID-19 concerns)						
March 29	at Dayton		Woerner Field	Cancelled (COVID-19 concerns)						
March 31	vs. Duke*		Durham Bulls Athletic Park; Durham, NC	Cancelled (COVID-19 concerns)						

April
Date	Opponent	Rank	Stadium Site	Score	Win	Loss	Save	Attendance	Overall Record	A10 Record
April 3	Saint Joseph's		Wilson Field	Cancelled (COVID-19 concerns)						
April 4	Saint Joseph's		Wilson Field	Cancelled (COVID-19 concerns)						
April 5	Saint Joseph's		Wilson Field	Cancelled (COVID-19 concerns)						
April 7	Wake Forest*		Wilson Field	Cancelled (COVID-19 concerns)						
April 10	at Richmond		Malcolm Pitt Field; Tuckahoe, VA	Cancelled (COVID-19 concerns)						
April 11	Richmond		Malcolm Pitt Field	Cancelled (COVID-19 concerns)						
April 12	Richmond		Malcolm Pitt Field	Cancelled (COVID-19 concerns)						
April 14	USC Upstate*		Wilson Field	Cancelled (COVID-19 concerns)						
April 17	at George Mason		Spuhler Field; Fairfax, VA	Cancelled (COVID-19 concerns)						
April 18	at George Mason		Spuhler Field	Cancelled (COVID-19 concerns)						
April 19	at George Mason		Spuhler Field	Cancelled (COVID-19 concerns)						
April 21	Gardner–Webb*		Wilson Field	Cancelled (COVID-19 concerns)						
April 24	VCU		Wilson Field	Cancelled (COVID-19 concerns)						
April 25	VCU		Wilson Field	Cancelled (COVID-19 concerns)						
April 26	VCU		Wilson Field	Cancelled (COVID-19 concerns)						
April 28	at High Point*		George Erath Field; High Point, NC	Cancelled (COVID-19 concerns)						

May
Date	Opponent	Rank	Stadium Site	Score	Win	Loss	Save	Attendance	Overall Record	A10 Record
May 1	at Fordham		Houlihan Park; The Bronx, NY	Cancelled (COVID-19 concerns)						
May 2	at Fordham		Houlihan Park	Cancelled (COVID-19 concerns)						
May 3	at Fordham		Houlihan Park	Cancelled (COVID-19 concerns)						
May 5	High Point*		Wilson Field	Cancelled (COVID-19 concerns)						
May 6	at Winthrop*		Winthrop Ballpark; Rock Hill, SC	Cancelled (COVID-19 concerns)						
May 14	George Washington		Wilson Field	Cancelled (COVID-19 concerns)						
May 15	George Washington		Wilson Field	Cancelled (COVID-19 concerns)						
May 16	George Washington		Wilson Field	Cancelled (COVID-19 concerns)						

Postseason

A10 Tournament
Date	Opponent	Seed	Site/stadium	Score	Win	Loss	Save	TV	Attendance	Overall record	A10T Record
May 20–23			The Diamond; Richmond, VA								

Legend: = Win = Loss = Cancelled
Bold = Davidson team member * = Non-conference game

Schedule source:

*Rankings are based on the team's current ranking in the D1Baseball poll.

== Rankings ==
Ranking movements Legend: ██ Increase in ranking ██ Decrease in ranking — = Not ranked RV = Received votes
	Week																			
Poll	Pre	1	2	3	4	5	6	7	8	9	10	11	12	13	14	15	16	17	18	Final
Coaches'	—	—*																		
Baseball America	—	—																		
Collegiate Baseball^	RV	—																		
NCBWA†	—	RV																		
D1Baseball	—	—																		

^ Collegiate Baseball ranked 40 teams in their preseason poll, but only ranked 30 teams weekly during the season.
† NCBWA ranks 30 teams in their preseason poll, but only ranks 25 teams weekly during the season.
* A new poll was not released for this week, so for comparison purposes, the previous week's ranking is inserted in this week's slot.
