= 2020 Fordham Rams baseball team =

American college baseball season

2020 Fordham Rams baseball
- Conference: Atlantic 10 Conference
- Record: 9–6 (0–0 A-10)
- Head coach: Kevin Leighton (10th season)
- Assistant coaches: Elliot Glynn (1st season); Pat Porter (2nd season); Tony Mellaci (32nd season)
- Home stadium: Houlihan Park

2020 Atlantic 10 Conference baseball standings
	Conf.				Overall
Team	W		L	PCT	W		L	PCT
Davidson ‍‍‍	0	–	0	–	13	–	3	.813
Saint Louis ‍‍‍	0	–	0	–	10	–	6	.625
Fordham ‍‍‍	0	–	0	–	10	–	6	.625
Rhode Island ‍‍‍	0	–	0	–	8	–	5	.615
VCU ‍‍‍	0	–	0	–	9	–	8	.529
George Washington ‍‍‍	0	–	0	–	8	–	8	.500
Dayton ‍‍‍	0	–	0	–	6	–	8	.429
St. Bonaventure ‍‍‍	0	–	0	–	3	–	4	.429
La Salle ‍‍‍	0	–	0	–	5	–	9	.357
Saint Joseph's ‍‍‍	0	–	0	–	5	–	10	.333
Richmond ‍‍‍	0	–	0	–	5	–	12	.294
UMass ‍‍‍	0	–	0	–	1	–	8	.111
George Mason ‍‍‍	0	–	0	–	1	–	14	.067
† – Conference champion ‡ – Tournament champion y – Invited to the NCAA tournament As of March 12, 2020; Rankings from D1Baseball

The 2020 Fordham Rams baseball team represented Fordham University during the 2020 NCAA Division I baseball season. It is the program's 161st season of existence, and their 26th season playing in the Atlantic 10 Conference. General manager, Kevin Leighton assumed managerial duties for the 10th season.

Fordham entered 2020 as the defending Atlantic 10 Tournament champions.

== Schedule ==
Legend
	Fordham win
	Fordham loss
	Postponement/cancellation
*	Non-conference game

2020 Fordham Rams baseball game log
Regular season
February

Date	Rank	Opponent	Site/stadium	Score	Overall record	A10 record
February 14		at FIU*	Infinity Insurance Park • Miami, FL	L 7–20	0–1	—
February 15		at FIU*	Infinity Insurance Park • Miami, FL	L 0–8 (7)	0–2	—
February 16		at FIU*	Infinity Insurance Park • Miami, FL	L 2–18	0–3	—
February 19		LIU*	Houlihan Park • The Bronx, NY	W 3–0	1–3	—
February 21		vs. Cal State Northridge*; GCU Classic	Brazell Field • Phoenix, AZ	L 5–12	1–4	—
February 22		at Grand Canyon*; GCU Classic	Brazell Field • Phoenix, AZ	L 3–6	1–5	—
February 23		at Grand Canyon*; GCU Classic	Brazell Field • Phoenix, AZ	L 3–4	1–6	—
February 25		Sacred Heart*	Houlihan Park • The Bronx, NY	W 5–4 (13)	2–6	—
February 28		at Furman*	Latham Stadium • Greenville, SC	W 5–1	3–6	—
February 29		at Furman*	Latham Stadium • Greenville, SC	W 8–3	4–6	—

March

Date	Rank	Opponent	Site/stadium	Score	Overall record	A10 record
March 1		at Furman*	Latham Stadium • Greenville, SC	W 11–3	5–6	—
March 4		NJIT*	Houlihan Park • The Bronx, NY	W 3–1	6–6	—
March 6		Iona*	Houlihan Park • The Bronx, NY	W 5–1	7–6	—
March 7		Iona*	Houlihan Park • The Bronx, NY	W 16–2	8–6	—
March 8		Iona*	Houlihan Park • The Bronx, NY	W 11–0	9–6	—
March 11		Wagner*	Houlihan Park • The Bronx, NY	W 11–5	10–6	—
March 13		St. John's*; Rivalry	Houlihan Park • The Bronx, NY	Cancelled due to the COVID-19 pandemic		
March 14		at St. John's*; Rivalry	Jack Kaiser Stadium • Queens, NY	Cancelled due to the COVID-19 pandemic		
March 15		at St. John's*; Rivalry	Jack Kaiser Stadium • Queens, NY	Cancelled due to the COVID-19 pandemic		
March 18		at Cal Baptist*	James W. Totman Stadium • Riverside, CA	Cancelled due to the COVID-19 pandemic		
March 20		at UC Santa Barbara*	Caesar Uyesaka Stadium • Santa Barbara, CA	Cancelled due to the COVID-19 pandemic		
March 21		at UC Santa Barbara*	Caesar Uyesaka Stadium • Santa Barbara, CA	Cancelled due to the COVID-19 pandemic		
March 22		at UC Santa Barbara*	Caesar Uyesaka Stadium • Santa Barbara, CA	Cancelled due to the COVID-19 pandemic		
March 24		at Sacred Heart*	Veterans Memorial Park • Bridgeport, CT	Cancelled due to the COVID-19 pandemic		
March 25		Manhattan*; Battle of the Bronx	Houlihan Park • The Bronx, NY	Cancelled due to the COVID-19 pandemic		
March 27		Rhode Island	Houlihan Park • The Bronx, NY	Cancelled due to the COVID-19 pandemic		
March 28		Rhode Island	Houlihan Park • The Bronx, NY	Cancelled due to the COVID-19 pandemic		
March 29		Rhode Island	Houlihan Park • The Bronx, NY	Cancelled due to the COVID-19 pandemic		
March 31		Siena*	Houlihan Park • The Bronx, NY	Cancelled due to the COVID-19 pandemic		

April

Date	Rank	Opponent	Site/stadium	Score	Overall record	A10 record
April 3		at Saint Louis	Billiken Sports Center • St. Louis, MO	Cancelled due to the COVID-19 pandemic		
April 4		at Saint Louis	Billiken Sports Center • St. Louis, MO	Cancelled due to the COVID-19 pandemic		
April 5		at Saint Louis	Billiken Sports Center • St. Louis, MO	Cancelled due to the COVID-19 pandemic		
April 7		at Siena*	Siena Baseball Field • Loudonville, NY	Cancelled due to the COVID-19 pandemic		
April 9		at Saint Joseph's	Smithson Field • Merion Station, PA	Cancelled due to the COVID-19 pandemic		
April 10		at Saint Joseph's	Smithson Field • Merion Station, PA	Cancelled due to the COVID-19 pandemic		
April 11		at Saint Joseph's	Smithson Field • Merion Station, PA	Cancelled due to the COVID-19 pandemic		
April 14		Fairfield*	Houlihan Park • The Bronx, NY	Cancelled due to the COVID-19 pandemic		
April 17		George Washington	Houlihan Park • The Bronx, NY	Cancelled due to the COVID-19 pandemic		
April 18		George Washington	Houlihan Park • The Bronx, NY	Cancelled due to the COVID-19 pandemic		
April 19		George Washington	Houlihan Park • The Bronx, NY	Cancelled due to the COVID-19 pandemic		
April 22		at Columbia*	Satow Stadium • Manhattan, NY	Cancelled due to the COVID-19 pandemic		
April 24		at La Salle	Hank DeVincent Field • Philadelphia, PA	Cancelled due to the COVID-19 pandemic		
April 25		at La Salle	Hank DeVincent Field • Philadelphia, PA	Cancelled due to the COVID-19 pandemic		
April 26		at La Salle	Hank DeVincent Field • Philadelphia, PA	Cancelled due to the COVID-19 pandemic		
April 28		Albany*	Houlihan Park • The Bronx, NY	Cancelled due to the COVID-19 pandemic		

May

Date	Rank	Opponent	Site/stadium	Score	Overall record	A10 record
May 1		Davidson	Houlihan Park • The Bronx, NY	Cancelled due to the COVID-19 pandemic		
May 2		Davidson	Houlihan Park • The Bronx, NY	Cancelled due to the COVID-19 pandemic		
May 3		Davidson	Houlihan Park • The Bronx, NY	Cancelled due to the COVID-19 pandemic		
May 8		at Richmond	Malcolm U. Pitt Field • Richmond, VA	Cancelled due to the COVID-19 pandemic		
May 9		at Richmond	Malcolm U. Pitt Field • Richmond, VA	Cancelled due to the COVID-19 pandemic		
May 10		at Richmond	Malcolm U. Pitt Field • Richmond, VA	Cancelled due to the COVID-19 pandemic		
May 14		UMass	Houlihan Park • The Bronx, NY	Cancelled due to the COVID-19 pandemic		
May 15		UMass	Houlihan Park • The Bronx, NY	Cancelled due to the COVID-19 pandemic		
May 16		UMass	Houlihan Park • The Bronx, NY	Cancelled due to the COVID-19 pandemic		

Postseason
Atlantic 10 Tournament

Date	Rank	Opponent	Site/stadium	Score	Overall record	Potseason record
May 20		vs. TBD	The Diamond • Richmond, VA	Cancelled due to the COVID-19 pandemic		

== Rankings ==
Ranking movements
	Week																			
Poll	Pre	1	2	3	4	5	6	7	8	9	10	11	12	13	14	15	16	17	18	Final
Coaches'		*																		
Baseball America																				
NCBWA†																				

† NCBWA ranks 30 teams in their preseason poll, but only ranks 25 teams weekly during the season.
* A new poll was not released for this week, so for comparison purposes, the previous week's ranking is inserted in this week's slot.
