= 2020 The Citadel Bulldogs baseball team =

American college baseball season

2020 The Citadel Bulldogs baseball
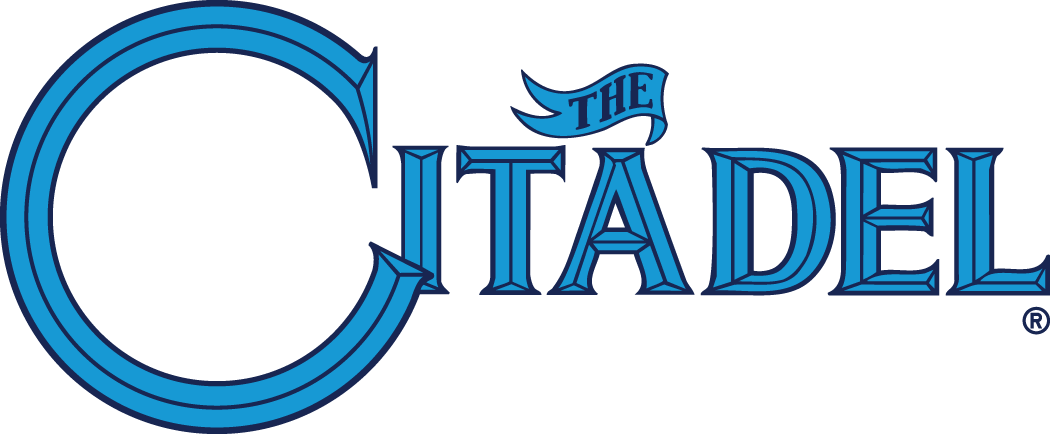
- Conference: Southern Conference
- Record: 10–6 (0–0 SoCon)
- Head coach: Tony Skole (3rd season)
- Hitting coach: Zach Lucas (1st season)
- Pitching coach: Blake Cooper (3rd season)
- Home stadium: Joseph P. Riley Jr. Park

2020 Southern Conference baseball standings
	Conf.				Overall
Team	W		L	PCT	W		L	PCT
Samford ‍‍‍	0	–	0	–	13	–	2	.867
Wofford ‍‍‍	0	–	0	–	14	–	3	.824
Mercer ‍‍‍	0	–	0	–	13	–	3	.813
East Tennessee State ‍‍‍	0	–	0	–	12	–	3	.800
UNC Greensboro ‍‍‍	0	–	0	–	11	–	5	.688
The Citadel ‍‍‍	0	–	0	–	10	–	6	.625
Western Carolina ‍‍‍	0	–	0	–	8	–	8	.500
Furman ‍‍‍	0	–	0	–	8	–	9	.471
VMI ‍‍‍	0	–	0	–	4	–	13	.235
‡ – Tournament champion As of March 12, 2020; Rankings from D1Baseball

2020 The Citadel Bulldogs baseball team represented The Citadel in the 2020 NCAA Division I baseball season. The Bulldogs played their home games at Joseph P. Riley Jr. Park in Charleston, South Carolina. The team was coached by Tony Skole, in his 3rd season at The Citadel.

== Previous season ==
The Bulldogs struggled to a 12–43 overall record, just 5–19 in the Southern Conference. They were eliminated in the play-in round of the 2019 Southern Conference baseball tournament by Western Carolina

== Personnel ==
=== Roster ===
2020 The Citadel Bulldogs baseball roster
Pitchers: 6 - Hunter Barbee - Senior; 13 - Chace Cooper - Freshman; 15 - Cameron Reeves - Sophomore; 17 - Shane Connolly - Junior; 18 - Lathan Todd - Sophomore; 19 - Brandon Mulier - (redshirt) Senior; 20 - Zach Taglieri - Senior; 24 - Gant Starling - Freshman; 28 - Thomas Swafford - (redshirt) Senior; 31 - Caleb Speedy - Freshman; 33 - Devin Beckley - Junior; 37 - Simon Graf - Freshman; 40 - Will Barker - (redshirt) Freshman; 42 - Austin Blakely - (redshirt) Sophomore	Catchers: 4 - Will Bastian - Sophomore; 14 - Travis Lott - Freshman; Infielders: 0 - Brooks O'Brien - Junior; 1 - Tyler Corbitt - Sophomore; 10 - Crosby Jones - Freshman; 16 - Anthony Badala - Freshman; 21 - John Lanier - Freshman; 22 - Tilo Skole - (redshirt) Sophomore; 23 - Adam Colon - Junior; 32 - Noah Mitchell - Freshman	Outfielders: 2 - Wesley Lane - Sophomore; 3 - Luke Montenery - Freshman; 5 - Cam Jensen - Senior; 8 - Jeffery Brown - Senior; 9 - Lane Botkin - (redshirt) Sophomore; 11 - Andrew Judkins - Junior; 12 - Ryan McCarthy - Junior; 30 - Grant Dowis - Freshman; 34 - Cole Simpson - Sophomore; 39 - Clay Wilson - Freshman; Utility: 25 - Ches Goodman - Sophomore

=== Coaches ===
2020 The Citadel Bulldogs baseball coaching staff
- Tony Skole – Head coach – 3rd year
- Zach Lucas – Assistant coach (hitting/recruiting) – 1st year
- Blake Cooper – Assistant coach (pitching) – 3rd year
- Jonathan Sabo – Volunteer assistant coach – 2nd year

== Schedule ==
Legend
	The Citadel win
	The Citadel loss
	Cancellation
**Bold**	The Citadel team member
*	Non-Conference game

2020 The Citadel Bulldogs baseball game log
Regular season

February
Date	Opponent	Site/stadium	Score	Win	Loss	Save	Attendance	Overall record	SoCon Record
Feb 14	Coppin State*	Joseph P. Riley Jr. Park • Charleston, SC	**W** 5–1	**Connolly (1–0)**	Rea (0–1)	None		1–0	
Feb 15	Coppin State*	Joseph P. Riley Jr. Park • Charleston, SC	**W** 9–3	**Reeves (1–0)**	Canales (0–1)	None	247	2–0	
Feb 16	Coppin State*	Joseph P. Riley Jr. Park • Charleston, SC	**W** 15–7	**Taglieri (1–0)**	Ruffino (0–1)	None	227	3–0	
Feb 21	Yale*	Joseph P. Riley Jr. Park • Charleston, SC	**W** 4–3	**Connolly (2–0)**	Stiegler (0–1)	**Starling (1)**	165	4–0	
Feb 22	Yale*	Joseph P. Riley Jr. Park • Charleston, SC	**W** 10–3	**Reeves (2–0)**	Walsh (0–1)	None	317	5–0	
Feb 23	Yale*	Joseph P. Riley Jr. Park • Charleston, SC	**L** 0–9	Handa (1–0)	**Goodman (0–1)**	None	263	5–1	
Feb 25	at Charleston Southern*	Buccaneer Ballpark • North Charleston, SC	**W** 10–5	**Taglieri (2–0)**	Yoder (0–3)	**Starling (2)**	156	6–1	
Feb 28	Saint Peter's*	Joseph P. Riley Jr. Park • Charleston, SC	**W** 14–7	**Connolly (3–0)**	Albunia (0–1)	None	235	7–1	
Feb 29	Saint Peter's*	Joseph P. Riley Jr. Park • Charleston, SC	**W** 13–0	**Reeves (3–0)**	Candelaria (0–1)	None	197	8–1	

March
Date	Opponent	Site/stadium	Score	Win	Loss	Save	Attendance	Overall record	SoCon Record
Mar 1	Saint Peter's*	Joseph P. Riley Jr. Park • Charleston, SC	**W** 9–0	**Todd (1–0)**	Lebron (0–2)	None	211	9–1	
Mar 3	at USC Upstate*	Cleveland S. Harley Baseball Park • Spartanburg, SC	**L** 3–5	Wheeler (1–1)	**Beckley (0–1)**	None	192	9–2	
Mar 6	Hartford*	Joseph P. Riley Jr. Park • Charleston, SC	**L** 0–2	Dombkowski (3–0)	**Connolly (3–1)**	Nowak (3)	294	9–3	
Mar 7	Hartford*	Joseph P. Riley Jr. Park • Charleston, SC	**W** 7–0	**Reeves (4–0)**	Florence (1–2)	None	281	10–3	
Mar 8	Hartford*	Joseph P. Riley Jr. Park • Charleston, SC	**L** 3–13	Judenis (1–1)	**Todd (1–1)**	None	275	10–4	
Mar 10	at South Carolina*	Founders Park • Columbia, SC	**L** 1–10	Bosnic (2–0)	**Taglieri (2–1)**	None	5,623	10–5	
Mar 11	VCU*	Joseph P. Riley Jr. Park • Charleston, SC	**L** 4–8	Delane (1–2)	**Blakely (0–1)**	None	217	10–6	
Mar 13	Rider*	Joseph P. Riley Jr. Park • Charleston, SC	Canceled due to COVID-19 pandemic						
Mar 14	Rider*	Joseph P. Riley Jr. Park • Charleston, SC	Canceled due to COVID-19 pandemic						
Mar 15	Rider*	Joseph P. Riley Jr. Park • Charleston, SC	Canceled due to COVID-19 pandemic						
Mar 18	Winthrop*	Joseph P. Riley Jr. Park • Charleston, SC	Canceled due to COVID-19 pandemic						
Mar 20	Western Carolina	Joseph P. Riley Jr. Park • Charleston, SC	Canceled due to COVID-19 pandemic						
Mar 21	Western Carolina	Joseph P. Riley Jr. Park • Charleston, SC	Canceled due to COVID-19 pandemic						
Mar 22	Western Carolina	Joseph P. Riley Jr. Park • Charleston, SC	Canceled due to COVID-19 pandemic						
Mar 24	College of Charleston*	Joseph P. Riley Jr. Park • Charleston, SC	Canceled due to COVID-19 pandemic						
Mar 27	at Mercer	Claude Smith Field • Macon, GA	Canceled due to COVID-19 pandemic						
Mar 28	at Mercer	Claude Smith Field • Macon, GA	Canceled due to COVID-19 pandemic						
Mar 29	at Mercer	Claude Smith Field • Macon, GA	Canceled due to COVID-19 pandemic						
Mar 31	at Winthrop*	Winthrop Ballpark • Rock Hill, SC	Canceled due to COVID-19 pandemic						

April
Date	Opponent	Site/stadium	Score	Win	Loss	Save	Attendance	Overall record	SoCon Record
Apr 3	Samford	Joseph P. Riley Jr. Park • Charleston, SC	Canceled due to COVID-19 pandemic						
Apr 4	Samford	Joseph P. Riley Jr. Park • Charleston, SC	Canceled due to COVID-19 pandemic						
Apr 5	Samford	Joseph P. Riley Jr. Park • Charleston, SC	Canceled due to COVID-19 pandemic						
Apr 7	USC Upstate*	Joseph P. Riley Jr. Park • Charleston, SC	Canceled due to COVID-19 pandemic						
Apr 9	at VMI	Gray–Minor Stadium • Lexington, VA	Canceled due to COVID-19 pandemic						
Apr 10	at VMI	Gray–Minor Stadium • Lexington, VA	Canceled due to COVID-19 pandemic						
Apr 11	at VMI	Gray–Minor Stadium • Lexington, VA	Canceled due to COVID-19 pandemic						
Apr 14	at College of Charleston*	CofC Baseball Stadium at Patriots Point • Mount Pleasant, SC	Canceled due to COVID-19 pandemic						
Apr 17	at Wofford	Russell C. King Field • Spartanburg, SC	Canceled due to COVID-19 pandemic						
Apr 18	at Wofford	Russell C. King Field • Spartanburg, SC	Canceled due to COVID-19 pandemic						
Apr 19	at Wofford	Russell C. King Field • Spartanburg, SC	Canceled due to COVID-19 pandemic						
Apr 21	South Carolina*	Joseph P. Riley Jr. Park • Charleston, SC	Canceled due to COVID-19 pandemic						
Apr 24	at Ohio State*	Bill Davis Stadium • Columbus, OH	Canceled due to COVID-19 pandemic						
Apr 25	at Ohio State*	Bill Davis Stadium • Columbus, OH	Canceled due to COVID-19 pandemic						
Apr 26	at Ohio State*	Bill Davis Stadium • Columbus, OH	Canceled due to COVID-19 pandemic						
Apr 28	Charleston Southern*	Joseph P. Riley Jr. Park • Charleston, SC	Canceled due to COVID-19 pandemic						

May
Date	Opponent	Site/stadium	Score	Win	Loss	Save	Attendance	Overall record	SoCon Record
May 1	UNC Greensboro	Joseph P. Riley Jr. Park • Charleston, SC	Canceled due to COVID-19 pandemic						
May 2	UNC Greensboro	Joseph P. Riley Jr. Park • Charleston, SC	Canceled due to COVID-19 pandemic						
May 3	UNC Greensboro	Joseph P. Riley Jr. Park • Charleston, SC	Canceled due to COVID-19 pandemic						
May 5	at Clemson*	Doug Kingsmore Stadium • Clemson, SC	Canceled due to COVID-19 pandemic						
May 7	at East Tennessee State	Thomas Stadium • Johnson City, TN	Canceled due to COVID-19 pandemic						
May 8	at East Tennessee State	Thomas Stadium • Johnson City, TN	Canceled due to COVID-19 pandemic						
May 10	at East Tennessee State	Thomas Stadium • Johnson City, TN	Canceled due to COVID-19 pandemic						
May 12	Clemson*	Joseph P. Riley Jr. Park • Charleston, SC	Canceled due to COVID-19 pandemic						
May 14	Furman	Joseph P. Riley Jr. Park • Charleston, SC	Canceled due to COVID-19 pandemic						
May 15	Furman	Joseph P. Riley Jr. Park • Charleston, SC	Canceled due to COVID-19 pandemic						
May 16	Furman	Joseph P. Riley Jr. Park • Charleston, SC	Canceled due to COVID-19 pandemic						

Post-Season

SoCon Tournament
Date	Opponent	Site/stadium	Score	Win	Loss	Save	Attendance	Overall record	SoConT Record
May 19	TBD	Fluor Field at the West End • Greenville, SC	Canceled due to COVID-19 pandemic						
