= 2016 VCU Rams baseball team =

American college baseball season

2016 VCU Rams baseball
- Conference: Atlantic 10 Conference
- Record: 38–19 (15–7 A-10)
- Head coach: Shawn Stiffler (5th season)
- Assistant coaches: Kurt Elbin (4th season); Steve Hay (2nd season); ML Morgan (2nd season)
- Home stadium: The Diamond

2016 Atlantic 10 Conference baseball standings
	Conf.						Overall
Team	W		L		T	PCT	W		L		T	PCT
Rhode Island ‍†‍‡‍^{y}	18	–	6	–	0	.750	31	–	25	–	0	.554
VCU ‍‍‍	15	–	7	–	0	.682	38	–	19	–	0	.667
Saint Joseph's ‍‍‍	15	–	9	–	0	.625	31	–	23	–	0	.574
Saint Louis ‍‍‍	15	–	9	–	0	.625	25	–	31	–	0	.446
Fordham ‍‍‍	14	–	10	–	0	.583	29	–	29	–	0	.500
Davidson ‍‍‍	11	–	11	–	0	.500	28	–	26	–	0	.519
George Washington ‍‍‍	12	–	12	–	0	.500	24	–	33	–	0	.421
UMass ‍‍‍	11	–	13	–	0	.458	18	–	27	–	0	.400
St. Bonaventure ‍‍‍	11	–	13	–	0	.458	26	–	22	–	1	.541
Richmond ‍‍‍	11	–	13	–	0	.458	28	–	24	–	0	.538
Dayton ‍‍‍	8	–	16	–	0	.333	19	–	36	–	0	.345
George Mason ‍‍‍	7	–	17	–	0	.292	19	–	35	–	0	.352
La Salle ‍‍‍	6	–	18	–	0	.250	15	–	39	–	0	.278
† – Conference champion ‡ – Tournament champion y – Invited to the NCAA tournament As of June 4, 2016; Rankings from Collegiate Baseball

The 2016 VCU Rams baseball team is the program's 46th season fielding a varsity baseball program, and their fourth season the Atlantic 10 Conference.

Led by Shawn Stiffler for his third season, the Rams had their most successful baseball season in program history. The Rams advanced to the NCAA Super Regional for the first time ever, and won their first ever Atlantic 10 Conference baseball tournament. It was the program's return to the NCAA tournament for the first time since 2010.

== Personnel ==
=== 2016 roster ===
2016 VCU Rams Roster
Pitchers: 18 - Tanner Winters - Sophomore; 20 - Sean Thompson - Sophomore; 23 - Matt Jamer - Junior; 24 - Eric Neiman - Freshman; 25 - Benjamin Dum - Freshman; 28 - Jonathan Ebersole - Junior; 30 - Michael Dailey - Freshman; 31 - Brooks Vial - Junior; 32 - Sam Donko - Junior; 34 - Matt Oxner - Junior; 35 - Luke Crabb - Junior; 36 - Travis Reapsome - Sophomore; 37 - David Mervis - Freshman; 38 - Garrett Pearson - Sophomore; 40 - Jack Alkire - Freshman	Infielders: 2 - Cooper Mickelson - Junior; 4 - Daane Berezo - Sophomore; 7 - Brody Cook - Freshman; 10 - Jeff Welch - Sophomore; 13 - Zach Ching - Freshman; 15 - Darian Carpenter - Junior; 17 - Matt Davis - Junior; 26 - Mitchel Lacey - Sophomore; Utility: 8 - Logan Farrar - Junior; 14 - Haiden Lamb - Sophomore	Catchers: 11 - Walker Haymaker - Senior; 16 - Nick Rabat - Junior; 19 - Brett Hileman - RS Sophomore; 27 - Dylan Isquirdo - Junior; Outfielders: 1 - James Bunn - Senior; 3 - Jimmy Kerrigan - Senior; 9 - Cody Acker - Senior; 12 - Alex Gransback - Junior; 21 - Nick Atkinson - Freshman

== Schedule ==
Legend
VCU win
VCU loss
Postponement/cancellation

2016 VCU Rams baseball game log
Regular season

February (3–3)
#	Date	Opponent	Site/stadium	Score	Overall record	A10 record
1	Feb 19	at Kennesaw State	Fred Stillwell Stadium • Kennesaw, GA	W 15–11	1–0	–
2	Feb 20	at Georgia State	Georgia State Baseball Complex • Decatur, GA	W 8–6	2–0	–
3	Feb 21	at Georgia Tech	Russ Chandler Stadium • Atlanta, GA	L 1–9	2–1	–
4	Feb 26	vs. Eastern Kentucky; UNCW Tournament	Brooks Field • Wilmington, NC	L 2–12	2–2	–
5	Feb 27	vs. South Dakota State; UNCW Tournament	Brooks Field • Wilmington, NC	W 14–8	3–2	–
6	Feb 28	at UNC Wilmington; UNCW Tournament	Brooks Field • Wilmington, NC	L 4–14	3–3	–

March (13–6)
#	Date	Opponent	Site/stadium	Score	Overall record	A10 record
7	Mar 1	at Longwood	Bolding Stadium • Farmville, VA	L 9–10	3–4	–
8	Mar 5	Marist	The Diamond • Richmond, VA	W 3–0	4–4	–
9	Mar 6	Marist	The Diamond • Richmond, VA	W 7–6 (13)	5–4	–
10	Mar 7	Marist	The Diamond • Richmond, VA	W 3–0	6–4	–
11	Mar 9	Old Dominion	The Diamond • Richmond, VA	L 1–3	6–5	–
12	Mar 11	Wagner	The Diamond • Richmond, VA	W 3–2	7–5	–
13	Mar 12	Wagner	The Diamond • Richmond, VA	W 9–5	8–5	–
14	Mar 13	Wagner	The Diamond • Richmond, VA	W 4–3	9–5	–
15	Mar 15	at VMI	Gray–Minor Stadium • Lexington, VA	W 11–7	10–5	–
16	Mar 16	Monmouth	The Diamond • Richmond, VA	L 4–12	10–6	–
17	Mar 18	at Charleston	Patriot's Point • Charleston, SC	W 2–1	11–6	–
18	Mar 19	at Charleston	Patriots Point • Charleston, SC	W 4–3	12–6	–
19	Mar 20	at Charleston	Patriots Point • Charleston, SC	L 4–7	12–7	–
20	Mar 22	Longwood	The Diamond • Richmond, VA	W 5–2	13–7	–
21	Mar 25	St. Bonaventure	The Diamond • Richmond, VA	W 6–5	14–7	1–0
22	Mar 26	St. Bonaventure	The Diamond • Richmond, VA	W 3–2 (12)	15–7	2–0
23	Mar 27	St. Bonaventure	The Diamond • Richmond, VA	W 4–1	16–7	3–0
24	Mar 29	at Maryland	Shipley Field • College Park, MD	L 1–8	16–8	–
25	Mar 30	Maryland	The Diamond • Richmond, VA	L 1–7	16–9	–

April (13–6)
#	Date	Opponent	Site/stadium	Score	Overall record	A10 record
26	Apr 1	Dayton	The Diamond • Richmond, VA	W 9–2	17–9	4–0
27	Apr 2	Dayton	The Diamond • Richmond, VA	L 3–8	17–10	4–1
28	Apr 3	Dayton	The Diamond • Richmond, VA	W 5–3	18–10	5–1
29	Apr 5	#14 Virginia	The Diamond • Richmond, VA	W 7–5	19–10	–
30	Apr 8	at Rhode Island	Bill Beck Field • Kingston, RI	L 1–5	19–11	5–2
31	Apr 9	at Rhode Island	Bill Beck Field • Kingston, RI	L 3–7	19–12	5–3
32	Apr 10	at Rhode Island	Bill Beck Field • Kingston, RI	W 7–3	20–12	6–3
33	Apr 12	Norfolk State	The Diamond • Richmond, VA	W 4–2	21–12	–
34	Apr 13	at William & Mary	Plumeri Park • Williamsburg, VA	W 12–5	22–12	–
35	Apr 15	at La Salle	Hank DeVincent Field • Philadelphia, PA	W 4–1	23–12	7–3
36	Apr 16	at La Salle	Hank DeVincent Field • Philadelphia, PA	W 9–1	24–12	8–3
37	Apr 17	at La Salle	Hank DeVincent Field • Philadelphia, PA	W 2–1	25–12	9–3
38	Apr 20	at #16 Virginia	Davenport Field • Charlottesville, VA	W 11–5	26–12	–
39	Apr 22	Richmond (Capital City Classic)	The Diamond • Richmond, VA	L 4–5 (10)	26–13	9–4
40	Apr 23	Richmond (Capital City Classic)	The Diamond • Richmond, VA	W 2–1	27–13	10–4
41	Apr 24	Richmond (Capital City Classic)	The Diamond • Richmond, VA	L 4–6 (11)	27–14	10–5
42	Apr 26	VMI	The Diamond • Richmond, VA	W 8–5 (7)	28–14	–
43	Apr 29	at George Washington	Barcroft Park • Arlington, VA	W 3–0	29–14	11–5
44	Apr 30	at George Washington	Barcroft Park • Arlington, VA	L 3–4	29–15	11–6

May (7–2)
#	Date	Opponent	Site/stadium	Score	Overall record	A10 record
45	May 1	at George Washington	Barcroft Park • Arlington, VA	W 8–7	30–15	12–6
46	May 3	at North Carolina	Boshamer Stadium • Chapel Hill, NC	L 0–11	30–16	–
47	May 6	Saint Louis	The Diamond • Richmond, VA	W 1–0	31–16	13–6
48	May 7	Saint Louis	The Diamond • Richmond, VA	W 5–1	32–16	14–6
49	May 8	Saint Louis	The Diamond • Richmond, VA	W 7–6	33–16	15–6
50	May 13	at Presbyterian	Presbyterian Baseball Complex • Clinton, SC	W 3–2	34–16	–
51	May 14	at Presbyterian	Presbyterian Baseball Complex • Clinton, SC	W 13–2	35–16	–
52	May 15	at Presbyterian	Presbyterian Baseball Complex • Clinton, SC	W 10–7	36–16	–
53	May 17	at Old Dominion	Bud Metheny Baseball Complex • Norfolk, VA	Cancelled	–	–
54	May 19	at Davidson	T. Henry Wilson, Jr. Field • Davidson, NC	Cancelled	–	–
55	May 20	at Davidson	T. Henry Wilson, Jr. Field • Davidson, NC	L 5–11	36–17	15–7
56	May 20	at Davidson	T. Henry Wilson, Jr. Field • Davidson, NC	Cancelled	–	–

Postseason

Atlantic 10 Tournament
#	Date	Opponent	Site/stadium	Score	Overall record	Postseason Record
57	May 25	George Washington; First round	Houlihan Park • The Bronx, NY	W 5–1	37–17	1–0
58	May 26	Davidson; Second round – Winner's bracket	Houilhan Park • The Bronx, NY	L 3–7	37–18	1–1
59	May 26	George Washington; Second round – Loser's bracket	Houilhan Park • The Bronx, NY	W 12–4	38–18	2–1
60	May 27	St. Joseph's; Quarterfinals – Loser's bracket	Houilhan Park • The Bronx, NY	L 1–13	38–19	2–2

== Rankings ==
Ranking movements Legend: — = Not ranked
	Week																			
Poll	Pre	1	2	3	4	5	6	7	8	9	10	11	12	13	14	15	16	17	18	Final
Coaches'	—	—*	—	—	—	—	—	—	—	—	—	—	—	—	—	—	—	—	—	—
Baseball America	—	—	—	—	—	—	—	—	—	—	—	—	—	—	—	—	—	—	—	—
Collegiate Baseball^	—	—	—	—	—	—	—	—	—	—	—	—	—	—	—	—	—	—	—	—
NCBWA†	—	—	—	—	—	—	—	—	—	—	—	—	—	—	—	—	—	—	—	—

^ Collegiate Baseball ranked 40 teams in their preseason poll, but only ranked 30 teams weekly during the season.
† NCBWA ranks 30 teams in their preseason poll, but only ranks 25 teams weekly during the season.
* A new poll was not released for this week, so for comparison purposes, the previous week's ranking is inserted in this week's slot.
