= 2014 UMass Minutemen baseball team =

American college baseball season

2014 UMass Minutemen baseball
- Conference: Atlantic 10 Conference
- Record: 13–29 (10–14 A-10)
- Head coach: Mike Stone (27th season)
- Assistant coaches: Mike Sweeney; Dennis Accomando
- Home stadium: Earl Lorden Field

2014 Atlantic 10 Conference baseball standings
	Conf.						Overall
Team	W		L		T	PCT	W		L		T	PCT
Saint Louis ‍†‍‍	18	–	7	–	1	.712	34	–	21	–	1	.616
Saint Joseph's ‍‍‍	18	–	8	–	0	.692	35	–	16	–	0	.686
George Mason ‍‍‡‍^{y}	16	–	9	–	0	.640	34	–	22	–	0	.607
VCU ‍‍‍	15	–	10	–	0	.600	37	–	20	–	0	.649
Richmond ‍‍‍	13	–	12	–	0	.520	24	–	28	–	1	.462
Dayton ‍‍‍	14	–	13	–	0	.519	24	–	30	–	0	.444
Fordham ‍‍‍	13	–	14	–	0	.481	24	–	30	–	0	.444
George Washington ‍‍‍	12	–	15	–	0	.444	20	–	30	–	0	.400
UMass ‍‍‍	12	–	15	–	0	.444	15	–	31	–	0	.326
La Salle ‍‍‍	9	–	15	–	1	.380	14	–	34	–	1	.296
Rhode Island ‍‍‍	7	–	18	–	0	.280	13	–	40	–	0	.245
St. Bonaventure ‍‍‍	6	–	17	–	0	.261	12	–	30	–	0	.286
† – Conference champion ‡ – Tournament champion y – Invited to the NCAA tournament As of June 7, 2014; Rankings from Collegiate Baseball

The 2014 UMass Minutemen baseball team represented the University of Massachusetts Amherst in the 2014 NCAA Division I baseball season. Mike Stone was in his 27th season as head coach. The Minutemen played their home games at Earl Lorden Field.

== 2014 Roster ==
2014 UMass Minutemen Roster
Pitchers: 24 Aaron Plunkett - Senior; 28 DJ Jauss - Senior; 17 Conor LeBlanc - Junior; 18 Andrew Grant - Junior; 23 Adam Picard - Redshirt Junior; 15 Evan Mackintosh - Sophomore; 29 Rob O'Neil - Sophomore; 19 Tim Cassidy - Redshirt Sophomore; 25 Mason Trubey - Sophomore; 16 Ben Panunzio - Sophomore; xx Ryan Venditti - Freshman; xx Ryan Moloney - Freshman; xx Tommy McDonald - Freshman; xx Mike Geannelis - Freshman; xx Aidan Connolly- Freshman	Infielders: 39 Dylan Begin - Senior; 7 Rob McLam - Senior; 44 Nik Campero - Senior; 5 Nick Sanford - Senior; 14 John Jennings - Sophomore; 4 Mark Brodd - Sophomore; 10 Zach Littman - Sophomore; 11 Vinny Scifo - Sophomore; xx Bryce Maher - Freshman; xx John Mione - Freshman; xx Jon Avallone - Freshman	Catchers: xx Mike Hart - Freshman; xx Zack Leone - Freshman; xx Matt Bare - Freshman; Outfielders: 30 Kellen Pagel - Senior; 6 Kyle Adie - Redshirt Junior; 8 Jeff Cavanaro - Junior; 9 Paul Yanakopulos - Junior; 34 Dan Jonah - Sophomore; xx Dylan Morris - Freshman

== Schedule ==
2014 UMass Minutemen baseball game log
Regular season
February

Date	Opponent	Rank	Site/stadium	Score	Win	Loss	Save	Attendance	Overall record	A-10 record
February 22	Army	–	USA Baseball National Training Complex	0-14	Dignacco(2-0)	B. Walsh(0-1)	None	250	0-1	–
February 22	Army	–	USA Baseball National Training Complex	3-4	Larimer(1-0)	R. Moloney(0-1)	Griffith(1)	274	0-2	–
February 23	Army	–	USA Baseball National Training Complex	4-7	Meadows(1-0)	LeBlanc, C(0-1)	None	173	0-3	–

March

Date	Opponent	Rank	Site/stadium	Score	Win	Loss	Save	Attendance	Overall record	A-10 record
March 1	at Maryland	–	Shipley Field	0-4	Stinnett, J.(2-1)	LeBlanc, C(0-2)	None	-	0-4	–
March 1	at Maryland	–	Shipley Field	1-10	Shawaryn, M.(3-0)	Moloney, R(0-2)	None	397	0-5	–
March 2	at Maryland	–	Shipley Field	2-3	A. Robinson(1-0)	A. Plunkett(0-1)	None	263	0-6	–
March 7	at Davidson	–	T. Henry Wilson, Jr. Field	3-13	Mooney(2-1)	R. Maloney(0-3)	None	111	0-7	–
March 8	North Carolina A&T	–	T. Henry Wilson, Jr. Field	15-0	C. LeBlanc(1-2)	T. Boone(0-2)	None	104	1-7	–
March 9	at Davidson	–	T. Henry Wilson, Jr. Field	8-9	Neitzel(2-0)	A. Plunkett(0-2)	Saeta(3)	132	1-8	–
March 15	Army	–	Tampa, FL	3-4	J. Griffith(3-0)	B. Walsh(0-2)	None	214	1-9	–
March 15	Army	–	Tampa, FL	4-9	A. Robinett(1-2)	R. Maloney(0-4)	J. Larimer(1)	214	1-10	–
March 16	Army	–	Tampa, FL	4-7	G. Carroll(3-0)	M. Geannelis(0-1)	None	201	1-11	–
March 19	at Hartford	–	Fiondella Field	0-3	Murphy	A. Grant(0-1)	Gouin(2)	204	1-12	–
March 21	La Salle*	–	Earl Lorden Field	7-6	D. Jauss(1-0)	O'Neill(0-5)	None	217	2-12	1–0
March 22	La Salle*	–	Earl Lorden Field	8-6	B. Walsh(1-2)	Craig(0-1)	D. Jauss(1)	157	3-12	2–0
March 23	La Salle*	–	Earl Lorden Field	0-3	O'Neill(1-5)	A. Plunkett(0-3)	Cherry(3)	164	3-13	2–1
March 28	at Richmond*	–	Malcolm U. Pitt Field	4-6	de Marte(2-4)	C. LeBlanc(1-3)	Cook(4)	121	3-14	2–2
March 28	at Richmond*	–	Malcolm U. Pitt Field	1-10	Sterling(3-1)	R. Moloney(0-5)	None	117	3-15	2–3
March 29	at Richmond*	–	Malcolm U. Pitt Field	5-8	Harron(2-0)	M. Geannelis(0-2)	Martinson(2)	212	3-16	2–4

April

Date	Opponent	Rank	Site/stadium	Score	Win	Loss	Save	Attendance	Overall record	A-10 record
April 2	at Boston College	–	John Shea Field	6-7	Skogsbergh(3-0)	D. Jauss(1-1)	Nicklas(2)	264	3-17	2–4
April 4	Dayton*	–	Earl Lorden Field	5-6	LAHRMAN(2-1)	B. Walsh(1-3)	Harris(3)	110	3-18	2–5
April 5	Dayton*	–	Earl Lorden Field	2-6	BUETTGEN(4-3)	A. Plunkett(0-4)	None	150	3-19	2–6
April 6	Dayton*	–	Earl Lorden Field	5-4	D. Jauss(2-1)	WEYBRIGHT(1-3)	None	210	4-19	3–6
April 9	Northeastern	–	Earl Lorden Field	5-3	A. Grant(1-1)	Lippert(1-3)	T. McDonald(1)	131	5-19	3–6
April 11	Saint Louis*	–	Earl Lorden Field	7-1	C. LeBlanc(2-3)	Bates(4-1)	None	117	6-19	4–6
April 12	Saint Louis*	–	Earl Lorden Field	3-2	M. Geannelis(1-2)	Norwood(4-1)	None	253	7-19	5–6
April 13	Saint Louis*	–	Earl Lorden Field	1-2	Eckelman(4-1)	R. Moloney(0-6)	None	257	7-20	5–7
April 18	at George Washington*	–	Barcroft Park	6-4	M. Geannelis(2-2)	Milon(1-3)	B. Walsh(1)	127	8-20	6–7
April 19	at George Washington*	–	Barcroft Park	2-3	Williams(4-3)	A. Plunkett(0-5)	Milon(6)	224	8-21	6–8
April 20	at George Washington*	–	Barcroft Park	4-5	Muhl(2-0)	B. Walsh(2-3)	None	247	8-22	6–9
April 21	at Harvard	–	Parsons Field	0-3	Coman(1-1)	R. Maloney(0-7)	Laurisch(1)	190	8-23	6–9
April 22	Connecticut	–	Earl Lorden Field	5-8	Brown(1-0)	T. Cassidy(0-1)	Mahoney(4)	123	8-24	6–9
April 25	at Fordham*	–	Houlihan Park	5-10	Porter(3-4)	M. Geannelis(2-3)	None	177	8-25	6–10
April 26	at Fordhman*	–	Houlihan Park	3-5	Kennedy(4-6)	A. Plunkett(0-6)	Porter(2)	186	8-26	6–11
April 27	at Fordham*	–	Houlihan Park	4-1	A. Grant(2-1)	Swatek(4-3)	None	333	9-26	7–11
April 29	Connecticut	-	Earl Lorden Field	5-4	E. Mackintosh(1-0)	A. Zapata(3-2)	B. Walsh(2)	110	10-26	7-11

May

Date	Opponent	Rank	Site/stadium	Score	Win	Loss	Save	Attendance	Overall record	A-10 record
May 2	George Mason*	-	Earl Lorden Field	7-12	Montefusco(7-2)	C. LeBlanc(2-4)	Kalish(1)	127	10-27	7-12
May 3	George Mason*	-	Earl Lorden Field	0-7	Gaynor(7-3)	A. Grant(2-2)	None	156	10-28	7-13
May 4	George Mason*	-	Earl Lorden Field	9-1	B. Walsh(2-4)	Williams(3-2)	None	111	11-28	8-13
May 9	VCU*	-	Earl Lorden Field	5-4	M. Geannelis(3-3)	Gill(3-4)	None	93	12-28	9-13
May 10	VCU*	-	Earl Lorden Field	6-10	Dwyer(6-1)	T. McDonald(0-1)	None	275	12-29	9-14
May 11	VCU*	-	Earl Lorden Field	5-4	M. Geannelis(4-3)	Lees(5-4)	None	210	13-29	10-14
May 1	at Saint Joseph's*	-	Campbell's Field	-	-	-	-	-	-	-
May 1	at Saint Joseph's*	-	Campbell's Field	-	-	-	-	-	-	-
May 1	at Saint Joseph's*	-	Campbell's Field	-	-	-	-	-	-	-

Rankings from USA TODAY/ESPN Top 25 coaches' baseball poll. Parenthesis indicate tournament seedings.
*Atlantic 10 Conference games
**Beanpot Challenge
