= 2012 Georgia State Panthers baseball team =

American college baseball season

2012 Georgia State Panthers baseball
- Conference: Colonial Athletic Association
- Record: 14–20 (5-7 CAA)
- Head coach: Greg Frady (5th season)
- Home stadium: GSU Baseball Complex

2012 Colonial Athletic Association baseball standings
	Conf.						Overall
Team	W		L		T	PCT	W		L		T	PCT
UNC Wilmington ‍†‍‡‍^{y}	24	–	6	–	0	.800	39	–	23	–	0	.629
Hofstra ‍‍‍	20	–	10	–	0	.667	34	–	22	–	0	.607
Delaware ‍‍‍	17	–	13	–	0	.567	31	–	27	–	0	.534
George Mason ‍‍‍	16	–	14	–	0	.533	33	–	24	–	0	.579
VCU ‍‍‍	15	–	15	–	0	.500	34	–	25	–	0	.576
Towson ‍‍‍	15	–	15	–	0	.500	27	–	31	–	0	.466
Georgia State ‍‍‍	14	–	16	–	0	.467	24	–	31	–	0	.436
Northeastern ‍‍‍	13	–	17	–	0	.433	23	–	28	–	0	.451
William & Mary ‍‍‍	12	–	18	–	0	.400	31	–	25	–	0	.554
James Madison ‍‍‍	10	–	20	–	0	.333	16	–	35	–	2	.321
Old Dominion ‍‍‍	9	–	21	–	0	.300	19	–	34	–	0	.358
† – Conference champion ‡ – Tournament champion y – Invited to the NCAA tournament As of June 30, 2012; Rankings from Collegiate Baseball

The 2012 Georgia State Panthers baseball team represented Georgia State University in the 2012 NCAA Division I baseball season. The Panthers played their home games at the GSU Baseball Complex.

== Personnel ==
=== 2012 Roster ===
2012 Georgia State Panthers roster
Pitchers: 40 Brandon Bast - (redshirt) Junior; 45 Jason Boulais - Sophomore; 35 Hunter Cash - (redshirt) Sophomore; 24 Tyler Claburn - Senior; 12 Jake Dyer - Senior; 14 Caleb Gore - Freshman; 47 Travis Lee - (redshirt) Sophomore; 2 Justin Malone - Senior; 23 Ben Marshall - Senior; 11 Aiden McLaughlin - (redshirt) Sophomore; 19 Cole Outz - Junior; 20 Max Schmitz - Freshman; 16 Nick Squeglia - Senior; 18 Connor Stanley - Freshman; 17 Jerry Stickey - Freshman; 15 T.J. Sullivan - Freshman	Catchers: 26 Landon Anderson - Junior; 27 Scott Sarratt - Junior; 21 Joel Van Asch - Freshman; Infielders: 7 Caden Bailey - Freshman; 6 Daniel Blaustein - Senior; 34 Greg Bowder - Junior; 29 Alex Prescott - Freshman; 22 Michael Douglas - Freshman; 3 Drew Shields - Junior; 4 Brandon Williams - Senior	Outfielders: 13 Kody Adams - Freshman; 32 Landon Bennett - Senior; 28 Mark Hogan - (redshirt) Junior; 5 Jonathan Kolowich - (redshirt) Sophomore; 1 Gabe Shivers - Senior; 9 Joey Wood - (redshirt) Senior

2012 Baseball - 2012 Roster

=== Coaching staff ===
2012 Georgia State Panthers baseball coaching staff
- 10 Greg Frady – Head coach - 5 years
- 22 Jason Arnold – Assistant coach, Pitching Coach - 2nd year
- 25 Willie Steward – Assistant coach - 1st year
- 33 Tim Burgess – Volunteer assistant coach - 2nd year

== Schedule ==
2012 Georgia State Panthers baseball game log
Regular season
February

#	Date	Opponent	Site/stadium	Score	Overall record	CAA record
1	February 17	Western Illinois	GSU Baseball Complex	5-7	0-1	-
2	February 17	Western Illinois	GSU Baseball Complex	7-0	1-1	-
3	February 18	Western Illinois	GSU Baseball Complex	11-9	2-1	-
4	February 19	Western Illinois	GSU Baseball Complex	9-4	3-1	-
5	February 22	Georgia	Athens, GA	1-4	3-2	-
6	February 24	Austin Peay	GSU Baseball Complex	8-5	4-2	-
7	February 25	Austin Peay	GSU Baseball Complex	3-5	4-3	-
8	February 26	Austin Peay	GSU Baseball Complex	9-7	5-3	-
9	February 29	USC Upstate	Spartanburg, SC	1-4	5-4	-

March

#	Date	Opponent	Site/stadium	Score	Overall record	CAA record
10	March 2	Southern Illinois	DeLand, FL	4-5	5-5	-
11	March 3	Penn	DeLand, FL	4-3	6-5	-
12	March 4	Stetson	DeLand, FL	0-5	6-6	-
13	March 7	Georgia Tech	GSU Baseball Complex	5-4	7-6	-
14	March 9	Kennesaw State	GSU Baseball Complex	5-11	7-7	-
15	March 10	Kennesaw State	Kennesaw, GA	4-5	7-8	-
16	March 11	Kennesaw State	Kennesaw, GA	6-7	7-9	-
17	March 13	Monmouth	GSU Baseball Complex	3-8	7-10	-
18	March 14	Mercer	Macon, GA	0-11	7-11	-
19	March 16	Northeastern	GSU Baseball Complex	13-12	8-11	1-0
20	March 17	Northeastern	GSU Baseball Complex	9-8	9-11	2-0
21	March 18	Northeastern	GSU Baseball Complex	4-13	9-12	2-1
22	March 20	Alabama State	Montgomery, AL	9-14	9-13	2-1
23	March 23	James Madison	GSU Baseball Complex	9-8	10-13	3-1
24	March 24	James Madison	GSU Baseball Complex	4-2	11-13	4-1
25	March 25	James Madison	GSU Baseball Complex	13-15	11-14	4-2
26	March 28	Savannah State	GSU Baseball Complex	15-3	12-14	4-2
27	March 30	George Mason	Fairfax, VA	3-6	12-15	4-3
28	March 31	George Mason	Fairfax, VA	8-3	13-15	5-3

April

#	Date	Opponent	Site/stadium	Score	Overall record	CAA record
29	April 1	George Mason	Fairfax, VA	1-3	13-16	5-4
30	April 4	Alabama State	GSU Baseball Complex	9-4	14-16	5-4
31	April 6	Hofstra	Hempstead, NY	3-4	14-17	5-5
32	April 7	Hofstra	Hempstead, NY	2-6	14-18	5-6
33	April 8	Hofstra	Hempstead, NY	3-5	14-19	5-7
34	April 11	Mercer	GSU Baseball Complex	5-12	14-20	5-7
35	April 13	William and Mary	GSU Baseball Complex	7-6	15-20	6-7
36	April 14	William and Mary	GSU Baseball Complex	1-0	16-20	7-7
37	April 15	William and Mary	GSU Baseball Complex	5-6	16-21	7-8
38	April 17	Georgia Tech	Atlanta, GA	4-8	16-22	7-8
39	April 20	Towson	Towson, MD	8-5	17-22	8-8
40	April 21	Towson	Towson, MD	1-11	17-23	8-9
41	April 22	Towson	Towson, MD	14-5	18-23	9-9
42	April 27	UNC Wilmington	GSU Baseball Complex	0-15	18-24	9-10
43	April 28	UNC Wilmington	GSU Baseball Complex	3-7	18-25	9-11
44	April 29	UNC Wilmington	GSU Baseball Complex	8-7	19-25	10-11

May

#	Date	Opponent	Site/stadium	Score	Overall record	CAA record
45	May 2	USC Upstate	GSU Baseball Complex	3-15	19-26	10-11
46	May 4	VCU	Richmond, VA	3-4	19-27	10-12
47	May 5	VCU	Richmond, VA	12-3	20-27	11-12
48	May 6	VCU	Richmond, VA	4-6	20-28	11-13
49	May 8	UNC Asheville	Asheville, NC	13-8	21-28	11-13
50	May 9	UNC Asheville	Asheville, NC	Cancelled	-	-
51	May 11	Delaware	GSU Baseball Complex	4-3	22-28	12-13
52	May 12	Delaware	GSU Baseball Complex	1-4	22-29	12-14
53	May 13	Delaware	GSU Baseball Complex	6-11	22-30	12-15
54	May 17	Old Dominion	Norfolk, VA	1-8	22-31	12-16
55	May 18	Old Dominion	Norfolk, VA	8-6	23-31	13-16
56	May 19	Old Dominion	Norfolk, VA	8-4	24-31	14-16
