= 2020 Atlantic 10 Conference baseball tournament =

Cancelled college baseball tournament

- Teams: 7
- Format: Double-elimination
- Finals site: The Diamond; Richmond, Virginia

2020 Atlantic 10 Conference baseball standings
	Conf.				Overall
Team	W		L	PCT	W		L	PCT
Davidson ‍‍‍	0	–	0	–	13	–	3	.813
Saint Louis ‍‍‍	0	–	0	–	10	–	6	.625
Fordham ‍‍‍	0	–	0	–	10	–	6	.625
Rhode Island ‍‍‍	0	–	0	–	8	–	5	.615
VCU ‍‍‍	0	–	0	–	9	–	8	.529
George Washington ‍‍‍	0	–	0	–	8	–	8	.500
Dayton ‍‍‍	0	–	0	–	6	–	8	.429
St. Bonaventure ‍‍‍	0	–	0	–	3	–	4	.429
La Salle ‍‍‍	0	–	0	–	5	–	9	.357
Saint Joseph's ‍‍‍	0	–	0	–	5	–	10	.333
Richmond ‍‍‍	0	–	0	–	5	–	12	.294
UMass ‍‍‍	0	–	0	–	1	–	8	.111
George Mason ‍‍‍	0	–	0	–	1	–	14	.067
† – Conference champion ‡ – Tournament champion y – Invited to the NCAA tournament As of March 12, 2020; Rankings from D1Baseball

The 2020 Atlantic 10 Conference baseball tournament was scheduled to take place from May 20 to 23, 2020. The top seven regular season finishers of the league's twelve teams were to meet in the double-elimination tournament to be held at The Diamond, the home field of VCU in Richmond, Virginia. The winner was to earn the conference's automatic bid to the 2020 NCAA Division I baseball tournament.

On March 12, 2020, the tournament was cancelled due to the COVID-19 pandemic.
