= 2020 VCU Rams baseball team =

American college baseball season

2020 VCU Rams baseball
- Conference: Atlantic 10 Conference
- Record: 9–8 (0–0 A-10)
- Head coach: Shawn Stiffler (8th season)
- Assistant coaches: Mike McRae (3rd season); Rich Witten (3rd season); Josh Tutwiler (5th season)
- Home stadium: The Diamond

2020 Atlantic 10 Conference baseball standings
	Conf.				Overall
Team	W		L	PCT	W		L	PCT
Davidson ‍‍‍	0	–	0	–	13	–	3	.813
Saint Louis ‍‍‍	0	–	0	–	10	–	6	.625
Fordham ‍‍‍	0	–	0	–	10	–	6	.625
Rhode Island ‍‍‍	0	–	0	–	8	–	5	.615
VCU ‍‍‍	0	–	0	–	9	–	8	.529
George Washington ‍‍‍	0	–	0	–	8	–	8	.500
Dayton ‍‍‍	0	–	0	–	6	–	8	.429
St. Bonaventure ‍‍‍	0	–	0	–	3	–	4	.429
La Salle ‍‍‍	0	–	0	–	5	–	9	.357
Saint Joseph's ‍‍‍	0	–	0	–	5	–	10	.333
Richmond ‍‍‍	0	–	0	–	5	–	12	.294
UMass ‍‍‍	0	–	0	–	1	–	8	.111
George Mason ‍‍‍	0	–	0	–	1	–	14	.067
† – Conference champion ‡ – Tournament champion y – Invited to the NCAA tournament As of March 12, 2020; Rankings from D1Baseball

The 2020 VCU Rams baseball team was the program's 50th baseball season, and their 8th season the Atlantic 10 Conference. The regular season began on February 14, 2020, and was scheduled to conclude on May 16, 2020. The season was cancelled on March 12, 2020, due to the COVID-19 pandemic. The Rams finished the season with a 9–8 record.

The Atlantic 10 Baseball Tournament was to be hosted by VCU and was to be held from May 20–23, 2020.

== Preseason ==
=== A10 media poll ===
The Atlantic 10 baseball media poll was released on February 10, 2020. VCU was picked to win the Atlantic 10 regular season championship.

Coaches' Poll
Predicted finish	Team	Points
1	VCU	162 (8)
2	Fordham	149 (2)
3	Dayton	144 (3)
4	Richmond	123
5	Davidson	112
6	Saint Louis	111
7	Rhode Island	97
8	George Washington	73
9	Saint Joseph's	71
10	George Mason	52
11	UMass	37
12	La Salle	31
13	St. Bonaventure	21

== Roster ==
2020 VCU Rams Roster
Pitchers: 8 – Hogan Brown – Junior; 9 – Nick Evangelista – Junior; 10 – Edwin Serrano – Junior; 12 – Brandon Henson – Senior; 18 – Justin Sorokowski – RS Junior; 19 – Jack Schroeder – Junior; 20 – Jaden Griffin – Sophomore; 23 – Devin Dunn – Junior; 24 – Maddison Furman – Sophomore; 25 – Jack Masloff – Freshman; 26 – Cooper Benzin – RS Freshman; 30 – Michael Dailey – RS Senior; 33 – Mason Delane – Freshman; 38 – Danny Watson – Sophomore; 39 – Evan Chenier – Sophomore; 42 – Brooks Knapek – RS Junior; 42 – Nate Boyle – Junior; 43 – Carter Knapek – RS Junior; 45 – Evan Elliott – Freshman	Infielders: 1 – Steven Carpenter – Senior; 2 – Paul Witt – Senior; 3 – Brett Willett – Senior; 4 – Alex Aguila – Freshman; 6 – Phillipe Roy – Freshman; 14 – Brett Norwood – Senior; 16 – Liam Hibbits – Junior; 22 – Andrew Puglielli – Senior; 27 – Brett Young – RS Freshman; 28 – Tyler Locklear – Freshman; 32 – Greg Ryan – Sophomore; 40 – Will Carlone – Freshman; Utility: 8 – Hogan Brown – Junior; 19 – Jack Schroeder – Junior	Catchers: 15 – Hunter Vay – Junior; 17 – Josh Simon – Senior; 21 – Logan Amiss – Sophomore; 31 – Connor Hicks – RS Freshman; 36 – Matt Stallings – RS Junior; 37 – Nic Ericsson – Freshman; Outfielders: 12 – Brandon Henson – Senior; 26 – Cooper Benzin – Sophomore

== Game log ==
Legend
	VCU win
	VCU loss
	Postponement/cancellation
(10)	Extra innings
*	Non-conference game
**Bold**	VCU team member
†	Make-Up Game

2020 VCU Rams baseball game log
Regular season (8–4)

February (7–3)
Date	Opponent	Rank	Site/stadium	Score	Win	Loss	Save	Attendance	Overall record	A10 Record
February 14	at Charlotte*		Hayes Stadium • Charlotte, NC	**W** 17–5	**E. Chenier (1–0)**	B. McGowan (0–1)	**E. Serrano (1)**	812	1–0	—
February 15	at Charlotte*		Hayes Stadium • Charlotte, NC	**L** 4–5 (11)	T. Starnes (1–0)	**C. Knapek (0–1)**	none	887	1–1	—
February 16	at Charlotte*		Hayes Stadium • Charlotte, NC	**W** 8–4	**M. Furman (1–0)**	A. Roach (0–1)	none	682	2–1	—
February 18	Norfolk State*		The Diamond • Richmond, VA	**W** 10–1	**J. Griffin (1–0)**	J. DeLoatch (0–1)	none	361	3–1	—
February 21	Sacred Heart*		The Diamond • Richmond, VA	**W** 5–3	**D. Watson (1–0)**	C. Thompson (0–1)	**E. Chenier (1)**	276	4–1	—
February 22	Sacred Heart*		The Diamond • Richmond, VA	**L** 4–5	M. Aufiero (1–0)	**M. Delane (0–1)**	none	409	4–2	—
February 23	Sacred Heart*		The Diamond • Richmond, VA	**W** 6–1	**D. Watson (2–0)**	J. Kramer (0–1)	none	376	5–2	—
February 26	Old Dominion*; Rivalry		The Diamond • Richmond, VA	**L** 3–6	M. Parmentier (1–0)	**E. Serrano (0–1)**	N. Dean (2)	310	5–3	—
February 28	West Virginia*		The Diamond • Richmond, VA	**W** 4–1	**M. Furman (2–0)**	J. Wolf (2–1)	None	483	6–3	—
February 29	Georgetown*		The Diamond • Richmond, VA	**W** 20–6	**J. Masloff (1–0)**	A. Tonas (0–1)	None	369	7–3	—

March (2–5)
Date	Opponent	Rank	Site/stadium	Score	Win	Loss	Save	Attendance	Overall record	A10 Record
March 1	Wagner*		The Diamond • Richmond, VA	**W** 9–0	**D. Dunn (1–0)**	J. Beyer (0–1)	**E. Serrano (2)**	337	8–3	—
March 4	at North Carolina*		Boshamer Stadium • Chapel Hill, NC	**L** 3–8	D. Palermo (1–0)	**J. Sorokowski (0–1)**	None	1,652	8–4	—
March 7	vs. Illinois State*		John Sessions Stadium • Jacksonville, FL	**L** 5–8	C. Johnson (2–2)	**J. Masloff (1–1)**	None	175	8–5	—
March 7	at Jacksonville*		John Sessions Stadium • Jacksonville, FL	**L** 2–4	M. Cassala (1–2)	**M. Delane (0–2)**	C. Mauloni (2)	318	8–6	—
March 8	at Jacksonville*		John Sessions Stadium • Jacksonville, FL	**L** 1–2	C. Mauloni (1–1)	**E. Chenier (1–1)**	None	228	8–7	—
March 10	at Charleston*		Patriots Point Ballpark • Charleston, SC	**L** 3–8	J. Masloff (1–2)	**J. Price (2–1)**	None	476	8–8	—
March 11	at The Citadel*		Joseph P. Riley Jr. Park • Charleston, SC	**W** 8–4	**M. Delane (1–2)**	A. Blakely (0–1)	None	217	9–8	—
March 13	Iona*		The Diamond • Richmond, VA	Cancelled due to COVID-19 pandemic					–	—
March 14	Iona*		The Diamond • Richmond, VA	Cancelled due to COVID-19 pandemic					–	—
March 15	Iona*		The Diamond • Richmond, VA	Cancelled due to COVID-19 pandemic					–	—
March 17	East Carolina*		The Diamond • Richmond, VA	Cancelled due to COVID-19 pandemic					–	—
March 20	St. Bonaventure		The Diamond • Richmond, VA	Cancelled due to COVID-19 pandemic					–	—
March 21	St. Bonaventure		The Diamond • Richmond, VA	Cancelled due to COVID-19 pandemic					–	—
March 22	St. Bonaventure		The Diamond • Richmond, VA	Cancelled due to COVID-19 pandemic					–	—
March 24	William & Mary*		The Diamond • Richmond, VA	Cancelled due to COVID-19 pandemic					–	—
March 27	at George Washington		Barcroft Park • Arlington, VA	Cancelled due to COVID-19 pandemic					–	—
March 28	at George Washington		Barcroft Park • Arlington, VA	Cancelled due to COVID-19 pandemic					–	—
March 29	at George Washington		Barcroft Park • Arlington, VA	Cancelled due to COVID-19 pandemic					–	—
March 31	Maryland*		The Diamond • Richmond, VA	Cancelled due to COVID-19 pandemic					–	—

April (0–0)
Date	Opponent	Rank	Site/stadium	Score	Win	Loss	Save	Attendance	Overall record	A10 Record
April 3	Richmond; Capital City Classic		The Diamond • Richmond, VA	Cancelled due to COVID-19 pandemic					–	—
April 4	Richmond; Capital City Classic		The Diamond • Richmond, VA	Cancelled due to COVID-19 pandemic					–	—
April 5	Richmond; Capital City Classic		The Diamond • Richmond, VA	Cancelled due to COVID-19 pandemic					–	—
April 7	Virginia*; Duel at the Diamond		The Diamond • Richmond, VA	Cancelled due to COVID-19 pandemic					–	—
April 10	George Mason; Rivalry		The Diamond • Richmond, VA	Cancelled due to COVID-19 pandemic					–	—
April 11	George Mason; Rivalry		The Diamond • Richmond, VA	Cancelled due to COVID-19 pandemic					–	—
April 12	George Mason; Rivalry		The Diamond • Richmond, VA	Cancelled due to COVID-19 pandemic					–	—
April 14	at VMI*		Gray–Minor Stadium • Lexington, VA	Cancelled due to COVID-19 pandemic					–	—
April 17	at New Orleans*		Maestri Field • New Orleans, LA	Cancelled due to COVID-19 pandemic					–	—
April 18	at New Orleans*		Maestri Field • New Orleans, LA	Cancelled due to COVID-19 pandemic					–	—
April 19	at New Orleans*		Maestri Field • New Orleans, LA	Cancelled due to COVID-19 pandemic					–	—
April 21	at William & Mary*		Plumeri Park • Williamsburg, VA	Cancelled due to COVID-19 pandemic					–	—
April 24	Davidson		The Diamond • Richmond, VA	Cancelled due to COVID-19 pandemic					–	—
April 25	Davidson		The Diamond • Richmond, VA	Cancelled due to COVID-19 pandemic					–	—
April 26	Davidson		The Diamond • Richmond, VA	Cancelled due to COVID-19 pandemic					–	—
April 28	VMI*		The Diamond • Richmond, VA	Cancelled due to COVID-19 pandemic					–	—

May (0–0)
Date	Opponent	Rank	Site/stadium	Score	Win	Loss	Save	Attendance	Overall record	A10 Record
May 1	at Dayton		Woerner Field • Dayton, OH	Cancelled due to COVID-19 pandemic					–	—
May 2	at Dayton		Woerner Field • Dayton, OH	Cancelled due to COVID-19 pandemic					–	—
May 3	at Dayton		Woerner Field • Dayton, OH	Cancelled due to COVID-19 pandemic					–	—
May 6	at Old Dominion*; Rivalry		Bud Metheny Ballpark • Norfolk, VA	Cancelled due to COVID-19 pandemic					–	—
May 8	Saint Louis		The Diamond • Richmond, VA	Cancelled due to COVID-19 pandemic					–	—
May 9	Saint Louis		The Diamond • Richmond, VA	Cancelled due to COVID-19 pandemic					–	—
May 10	Saint Louis		The Diamond • Richmond, VA	Cancelled due to COVID-19 pandemic					–	—
May 12	at Virginia*; Duel at the Diamond		Davenport Field • Charlottesville, VA	Cancelled due to COVID-19 pandemic					–	—
May 14	at Rhode Island		Bill Beck Field • Kingston, RI	Cancelled due to COVID-19 pandemic					–	—
May 15	at Rhode Island		Bill Beck Field • Kingston, RI	Cancelled due to COVID-19 pandemic					–	—
May 16	at Rhode Island		Bill Beck Field • Kingston, RI	Cancelled due to COVID-19 pandemic					–	—

Post-season (0–0)

Atlantic 10 Tournament (0–0)
Date	Opponent	Rank	Site/stadium	Score	Win	Loss	Save	Attendance	Overall record	Postseason Record
May 20	TBD; First round		The Diamond • Richmond, VA	Cancelled due to COVID-19 pandemic					–	—

== Rankings ==
Ranking movements Legend: ██ Increase in ranking ██ Decrease in ranking — = Not ranked RV = Received votes
	Week																			
Poll	Pre	1	2	3	4	5	6	7	8	9	10	11	12	13	14	15	16	17	18	Final
Coaches'	—	—*	—	—	—	—	—	—	—	—	—	—	—	—	—	—	—	—	—	—
Baseball America	—	—	—	—	—	—	—	—	—	—	—	—	—	—	—	—	—	—	—	—
Collegiate Baseball^	RV	—	—	—	—	—	—	—	—	—	—	—	—	—	—	—	—	—	—	—
NCBWA†	—	—	—	—	—	—	—	—	—	—	—	—	—	—	—	—	—	—	—	—
D1Baseball	—	—	—	—	—	—	—	—	—	—	—	—	—	—	—	—	—	—	—	—

^ Collegiate Baseball ranked 40 teams in their preseason poll, but only ranked 30 teams weekly during the season.
† NCBWA ranks 30 teams in their preseason poll, but only ranks 25 teams weekly during the season.
* A new poll was not released for this week, so for comparison purposes, the previous week's ranking is inserted in this week's slot.

== Honors ==
=== Preseason honors ===
Recipient	Award	Date	Ref.
Liam Hibbits	Collegiate Baseball Third-Team All-American	December 17, 2019	
