= 2014 VCU Rams baseball team =

American college baseball season

2014 VCU Rams baseball

Georgia Tech Invitational champions Charleston Crab House Shootout champions PK5 Classic champions
- Conference: Atlantic 10 Conference
- Record: 37–20 (15–10 A-10)
- Head coach: Shawn Stiffler (3rd season)
- Assistant coaches: Jeff Palumbo (3rd season); Kurt Elbin (2nd season); Sean Cutler-Voltz (1st season)
- Home stadium: The Diamond

2014 Atlantic 10 Conference baseball standings
	Conf.						Overall
Team	W		L		T	PCT	W		L		T	PCT
Saint Louis ‍†‍‍	18	–	7	–	1	.712	34	–	21	–	1	.616
Saint Joseph's ‍‍‍	18	–	8	–	0	.692	35	–	16	–	0	.686
George Mason ‍‍‡‍^{y}	16	–	9	–	0	.640	34	–	22	–	0	.607
VCU ‍‍‍	15	–	10	–	0	.600	37	–	20	–	0	.649
Richmond ‍‍‍	13	–	12	–	0	.520	24	–	28	–	1	.462
Dayton ‍‍‍	14	–	13	–	0	.519	24	–	30	–	0	.444
Fordham ‍‍‍	13	–	14	–	0	.481	24	–	30	–	0	.444
George Washington ‍‍‍	12	–	15	–	0	.444	20	–	30	–	0	.400
UMass ‍‍‍	12	–	15	–	0	.444	15	–	31	–	0	.326
La Salle ‍‍‍	9	–	15	–	1	.380	14	–	34	–	1	.296
Rhode Island ‍‍‍	7	–	18	–	0	.280	13	–	40	–	0	.245
St. Bonaventure ‍‍‍	6	–	17	–	0	.261	12	–	30	–	0	.286
† – Conference champion ‡ – Tournament champion y – Invited to the NCAA tournament As of June 7, 2014; Rankings from Collegiate Baseball

The 2014 VCU Rams baseball team represented Virginia Commonwealth University during the 2014 NCAA Division I baseball season. The Rams were led by Shawn Stiffler, in his third year managing the program and played their home games at The Diamond.

The Rams had one of their strongest starts in program history, starting the season with a 20–3 record and being ranked in the USA Today Coaches poll and the Collegiate Baseball poll. The Rams ultimately finished the season with a 37–20 record, and reached the final of the 2014 Atlantic 10 Conference baseball tournament before losing in the final to their rival, George Mason. Despite the strong record, VCU did not receive an at-large berth into the 2014 NCAA Division I baseball tournament.

== Personnel ==
=== 2014 roster ===
2014 VCU Rams Roster
Pitchers: 13 - Matt Lees - Junior; 14 - Logan Kanuik - Senior; 16 - Michael Carpenter - Sophomore; 20 - Seth Greene - RS Senior; 23 - Matt Jamer - Freshman; 30 - Brian Goodling - Freshman; 31 - Tyler Buckley - Junior; 32 - Daniel Concepcion - Junior; 33 - Dan Black - Sophomore; 34 - Matt Blanchard - Junior; 35 - Heath Dwyer - Junior; 37 - Thomas Gill - Junior; 38 - Jordan Storey - RS Senior; 40 - JoJo Howie - Junior	Infielders: 4 - Joey Cujas - Junior; 10 - Tom Crimi - Senior; 15 - Darian Carpenter - Freshman; 17 - Matt Davis - Freshman; 18 - Bryce Lee - Senior; 25 - Vimael Machin - Junior; 26 - Trevor Marino - Senior; 27 - Shane Dressler - Freshman; Utility: 8 - Logan Farrar - Freshman	Catchers: 7 - Chris Ayers - Senior; 11 - Walker Haymaker - Sophomore; 19 - Brett Hileman - Freshman; 21 - Nick Octavi - Senior; 24 - Joe Bugas - Freshman; Outfielders: 1 - James Bunn - Sophomore; 2 - Bill Cullen - Senior; 3 - Landon Prentiss - Senior; 9 - Cody Acker - Sophomore; 12 - Alex Gransback - Freshman

== Schedule ==
2014 VCU Rams baseball game log (37–20)
Regular season: 34–18

February (7–1)
Date	Time	Opponent	Rank	Stadium	Score	Win	Loss	Save	Attendance	Overall	A-10
Georgia Tech Invitational
February 14	6:00 p.m.	vs. Radford*		Russ Chandler Stadium; Atlanta, GA	W 9–4	Concepcion (1–0)	Haymaker (0–1)	None	1,021	1–0	—
February 15	12:00 p.m.	vs. Old Dominion*		Russ Chandler Stadium	W 6–3	Kanuik (1–0)	Gero (0–1)	Lees (1)	856	2–0	—
February 16	2:45 p.m.	at Georgia Tech*		Russ Chandler Stadium	W 5–3	Blanchard (1–0)	Heddinger (0–1)	Gill (1)	1,167	3–0	—
February 19	3:00 p.m.	Old Dominion*		The Diamond; Richmond, VA	L 4–6	Sinnen (1–0)	Gill (0–1)	Gero (1)	280	3–1	—
February 21	4:00 p.m.	at Furman*		Latham Stadium; Greenville, SC	W 14–9	Gill (1–1)	de Gruy (0–1)	None	308	4–1	—
February 22	4:00 p.m.	at Furman*		Latham Stadium	W 8–7	Kanuik (2–0)	Morse (1–1)	Lees (2)	394	5–1	—
February 23	1:00 p.m.	at Furman*		Latham Stadium	W 3–2^{10}	Gill (2–1)	Dittmar (0–1)	None	380	6–1	—
February 25	3:00 p.m.	East Carolina*		The Diamond	W 3–0	Concepcion (2–0)	Bolton (0–1)	Kanuik (1)	337	7–1	—

March: 13–5 (Home: 11–3; Away: 2–2; Neutral: 0–0)
Date	Time	Opponent	Rank	Stadium	Score	Win	Loss	Save	Attendance	Overall	A-10
March 1	1:00 p.m.	Temple*		The Diamond	W 5–2	Lees (1–0)	White (0–1)	None	353	8–1	—
March 1	4:30 p.m.	Temple*		The Diamond	W 10–0	Blanchard (2–0)	Mathews (0–2)	None	353	9–1	—
March 2	1:00 p.m.	Temple*		The Diamond	W 14–5	Howie (1–0)	Hill (0–2)	None	271	10–1	—
March 8	3:00 p.m.	at UNCW*		Bill Brooks Field; Wilmington, NC	L 2–4	Secrest (3–1)	Concepcion (2–1)	None	1,431	10–2	—
March 9	1:30 p.m.	at UNCW*		Bill Brooks Field	W 14–8	Carpenter (1–0)	MacDonald (0–1)	None	1,041	11–2	—
March 9	4:00 p.m.	at UNCW*		Bill Brooks Field	W 4–2	Howie (2–0)	Foster (0–1)	None	1,041	12–2	—

April: 5–5 (Home: 1–2; Away: 4–3; Neutral: 0–0)
Date	Time	Opponent	Rank	Stadium	Score	Win	Loss	Save	Attendance	Overall	A-10
April 3	ESPN+	at Rhode Island		Bill Beck Field; Kingston, RI	L 1–5	Sabbath (2–4)	Gotschall (2–2)	Houchens (2)	116	17–12	8–2
April 4	ESPN+	at Rhode Island		Bill Beck Field	L 2–4	Cullen (2–3)	Steitz (4–1)	Santos (2)	112	17–13	8–3
April 5	ESPN+	at Rhode Island		Bill Beck Field	L 5–7^{10}	Lavigueur (2–0)	Leyboldt (1–2)	None	103	17–14	8–4
April 7	ESPN+	at Longwood*		Bolding Stadium; Farmville, VA	W 6–4^{10}	Campbell (2–1)	Fordham (1–3)	None	433	18–14	—
April 10		at Fordham		Jack Coffey Field; New York City, NY	W 5–3	Newman (2–1)	Elson (3–4)	Peters (3)	217	19–14	9–4
April 11		at Fordham		Jack Coffey Field	W 13–1	Steitz (5–1)	Dowd (1–3)	None	249	20–14	10–4
April 12		at Fordham		Jack Coffey Field	W 7–6	Vaughan (2–0)	Hanawalt (1–5)	Peters (4)	223	21–14	11–4
April 14	ESPN+	No. 9 Virginia*		The Diamond	W 6–2	Newman (3–1)	Yeager (0–2)	None	982	22–14	—
April 17	ESPN+	George Washington		The Diamond	L 3–4	Haug (2–5)	Clover (0–2)	Bruno (3)	226	22–15	11–5
April 18	ESPN+	George Washington		The Diamond	L 7–8	Cutler (5–0)	Steitz (5–2)	Bruno (4)	211	22–16	11–6
April 19	ESPN+	George Washington		The Diamond							
April 21	ESPN+	Virginia Tech*		The Diamond							—
April 24	MASN2	at Richmond		Malcolm U. Pitt Field; Tuckahoe, VA							
April 25	ESPN+	at Richmond		Malcolm U. Pitt Field							
April 26	ESPN+	at Richmond		Malcolm U. Pitt Field							
April 28		at Old Dominion*		Bud Metheny Ballpark; Norfolk, VA							—

May: 0–0 (Home: 0–0; Away: 0–0; Neutral: 0–0)
Date	TV	Opponent	Rank	Stadium	Score	Win	Loss	Save	Attendance	Overall	A-10	Source
May 1		Saint Louis		The Diamond								
May 2		Saint Louis		The Diamond								
May 3		Saint Louis		The Diamond								
May 5		at Norfolk State*		Marty L. Miller Field; Norfolk, VA							—	
May 8		at Saint Joseph's		Smithson Field; Merion Station, PA								
May 9		at Saint Joseph's		Smithson Field								
May 10		at Saint Joseph's		Smithson Field								
May 14		Davidson		The Diamond								
May 15		Davidson		The Diamond								
May 16		Davidson		The Diamond								

Postseason: 0–0 (Home: 0–0; Away: 0–0; Neutral: 0–0)

Atlantic 10 Tournament: 0–0 (Home: 0–0; Away: 0–0; Neutral: 0–0)
Date	TV	Opponent	Rank	Stadium	Score	Win	Loss	Save	Attendance	Overall	A10T Record	Source
May 20–25		vs. TBD		TBD								

Legend: = Win = Loss = Canceled
Bold =VCU team member
Rankings are based on the team's current ranking in the D1Baseball poll.

Schedule Notes

== Rankings ==
Ranking movements Legend: ██ Increase in ranking ██ Decrease in ranking — = Not ranked RV = Received votes
	Week																			
Poll	Pre	1	2	3	4	5	6	7	8	9	10	11	12	13	14	15	16	17	18	Final
Coaches'	—	—*	—	—	—	RV	25	RV	—	—	—	—	—	—	—	—	—	—	—	—
Baseball America	—	—	—	—	—	—	RV	—	—	—	—	—	—	—	—	—	—	—	—	—
Collegiate Baseball^	—	—	—	—	RV	RV	26	—	—	—	—	—	—	—	—	—	—	—	—	—
NCBWA†	—	—	RV	—	—	—	RV	—	—	—	—	—	—	—	—	—	—	—	—	—

^ Collegiate Baseball ranked 40 teams in their preseason poll, but only ranked 30 teams weekly during the season.
† NCBWA ranks 30 teams in their preseason poll, but only ranks 25 teams weekly during the season.
* A new poll was not released for this week, so for comparison purposes, the previous week's ranking is inserted in this week's slot.
