= 2016 Atlantic 10 Conference baseball tournament =

American college baseball tournament

- Teams: 7
- Format: Double-elimination
- Finals site: Houlihan Park; Bronx, NY
- Champions: Rhode Island (2nd title)

2016 Atlantic 10 Conference baseball standings
| | Conf. | | | | | | Overall |
| Team | W | | L | | T | PCT | W | | L | | T | PCT |
|---|---|---|---|---|---|---|---|---|---|---|---|---|
| Rhode Island ‍†‍‡‍^{y} | 18 | – | 6 | – | 0 | .750 | 31 | – | 25 | – | 0 | .554 |
| VCU ‍‍‍ | 15 | – | 7 | – | 0 | .682 | 38 | – | 19 | – | 0 | .667 |
| Saint Joseph's ‍‍‍ | 15 | – | 9 | – | 0 | .625 | 31 | – | 23 | – | 0 | .574 |
| Saint Louis ‍‍‍ | 15 | – | 9 | – | 0 | .625 | 25 | – | 31 | – | 0 | .446 |
| Fordham ‍‍‍ | 14 | – | 10 | – | 0 | .583 | 29 | – | 29 | – | 0 | .500 |
| Davidson ‍‍‍ | 11 | – | 11 | – | 0 | .500 | 28 | – | 26 | – | 0 | .519 |
| George Washington ‍‍‍ | 12 | – | 12 | – | 0 | .500 | 24 | – | 33 | – | 0 | .421 |
| UMass ‍‍‍ | 11 | – | 13 | – | 0 | .458 | 18 | – | 27 | – | 0 | .400 |
| St. Bonaventure ‍‍‍ | 11 | – | 13 | – | 0 | .458 | 26 | – | 22 | – | 1 | .541 |
| Richmond ‍‍‍ | 11 | – | 13 | – | 0 | .458 | 28 | – | 24 | – | 0 | .538 |
| Dayton ‍‍‍ | 8 | – | 16 | – | 0 | .333 | 19 | – | 36 | – | 0 | .345 |
| George Mason ‍‍‍ | 7 | – | 17 | – | 0 | .292 | 19 | – | 35 | – | 0 | .352 |
| La Salle ‍‍‍ | 6 | – | 18 | – | 0 | .250 | 15 | – | 39 | – | 0 | .278 |
† – Conference champion ‡ – Tournament champion y – Invited to the NCAA tournament As of June 4, 2016; Rankings from Collegiate Baseball

The 2016 Atlantic 10 Conference baseball tournament took place from May 25 through 28. The top seven regular season finishers of the league's twelve teams met in the double-elimination tournament at Jim Houlihan Park at Jack Coffey Field, the home field of Fordham in the New York City borough of The Bronx. Champions Rhode Island earned the conference's automatic bid to the 2016 NCAA Division I baseball tournament.

== Seeding and format ==
The tournament will use the same format adopted in 2014, with the top seven finishers from the regular season seeded one through seven. The top seed will receive a single bye while remaining seeds will play on the first day.

| Team | W | L | Pct | GB | Seed |
|---|---|---|---|---|---|
| Rhode Island | 18 | 6 | .750 | — | 1 |
| VCU | 15 | 7 | .682 | 2 | 2 |
| Saint Joseph's | 15 | 9 | .625 | 3 | 3 |
| Saint Louis | 15 | 9 | .625 | 3 | 4 |
| Fordham | 14 | 10 | .583 | 4 | 5 |
| Davidson | 11 | 11 | .500 | 6 | 6 |
| George Washington | 12 | 12 | .500 | 6 | 7 |
| UMass | 11 | 13 | .458 | 7 | — |
| St. Bonaventure | 11 | 13 | .458 | 7 | — |
| Richmond | 11 | 13 | .458 | 7 | — |
| Dayton | 8 | 16 | .333 | 10 | — |
| George Mason | 7 | 17 | .292 | 11 | — |
| La Salle | 6 | 18 | .250 | 12 | — |

== Results ==
Upper round 1 | Upper round 2 | Upper final | Final
1 | Rhode Island | 10
5 | Fordham | 1
4 | Saint Louis | 7
5 | Fordham | 9
1 | Rhode Island | 13
6 | Davidson | 4
2 | VCU | 5
7 | George Washington | 1
2 | VCU | 3
6 | Davidson | 7
3 | Saint Joseph's | 4
6 | Davidson | 8
1 | Rhode Island | 15 | -
6 | Davidson | 2 | -
Lower round 1 | Lower round 2 | Lower round 3 | Lower final
7 | George Washington | 4
4 | Saint Louis | 1 | 2 | VCU | 12 | 6 | Davidson | 6
7 | George Washington | 6 | 2 | VCU | 1 | 3 | Saint Joseph's | 4
3 | Saint Joseph's | 13
3 | Saint Joseph's | 7
5 | Fordham | 6
