= 2012 Colonial Athletic Association baseball tournament =

American college baseball tournament

- Teams: 6
- Format: Double-elimination tournament
- Finals site: Eagle Field at Veterans Memorial Park; Harrisonburg, VA
- Champions: UNC Wilmington (3rd title)
- Winning coach: Mark Scalf (3rd title)
- MVP: Jimmy Yezzo (Delaware)

2012 Colonial Athletic Association baseball standings
| | Conf. | | | | | | Overall |
| Team | W | | L | | T | PCT | W | | L | | T | PCT |
|---|---|---|---|---|---|---|---|---|---|---|---|---|
| UNC Wilmington ‍†‍‡‍^{y} | 24 | – | 6 | – | 0 | .800 | 39 | – | 23 | – | 0 | .629 |
| Hofstra ‍‍‍ | 20 | – | 10 | – | 0 | .667 | 34 | – | 22 | – | 0 | .607 |
| Delaware ‍‍‍ | 17 | – | 13 | – | 0 | .567 | 31 | – | 27 | – | 0 | .534 |
| George Mason ‍‍‍ | 16 | – | 14 | – | 0 | .533 | 33 | – | 24 | – | 0 | .579 |
| VCU ‍‍‍ | 15 | – | 15 | – | 0 | .500 | 34 | – | 25 | – | 0 | .576 |
| Towson ‍‍‍ | 15 | – | 15 | – | 0 | .500 | 27 | – | 31 | – | 0 | .466 |
| Georgia State ‍‍‍ | 14 | – | 16 | – | 0 | .467 | 24 | – | 31 | – | 0 | .436 |
| Northeastern ‍‍‍ | 13 | – | 17 | – | 0 | .433 | 23 | – | 28 | – | 0 | .451 |
| William & Mary ‍‍‍ | 12 | – | 18 | – | 0 | .400 | 31 | – | 25 | – | 0 | .554 |
| James Madison ‍‍‍ | 10 | – | 20 | – | 0 | .333 | 16 | – | 35 | – | 2 | .321 |
| Old Dominion ‍‍‍ | 9 | – | 21 | – | 0 | .300 | 19 | – | 34 | – | 0 | .358 |
† – Conference champion ‡ – Tournament champion y – Invited to the NCAA tournament As of June 30, 2012; Rankings from Collegiate Baseball

The 2012 Colonial Athletic Association baseball tournament was held at Eagle Field at Veterans Memorial Park in Harrisonburg, Virginia, from May 23 through 26. The top six finishers from the regular season competed in the double-elimination tournament. Top seeded UNC Wilmington won their third title and earned the Colonial Athletic Association's automatic bid to the 2012 NCAA Division I baseball tournament.

== Seeding and format ==
This was the first year of the six team format, as previous seasons consisted of a four team tournament. The top six teams from the regular season, based on conference winning percentage, made the field.

| Team | W | L | PCT | GB | Seed |
|---|---|---|---|---|---|
| UNC Wilmington | 24 | 6 | .800 | – | 1 |
| Hofstra | 20 | 10 | .667 | 4 | 2 |
| Delaware | 17 | 13 | .567 | 7 | 3 |
| George Mason | 16 | 14 | .533 | 8 | 4 |
| VCU | 15 | 15 | .500 | 9 | 5 |
| Towson | 15 | 15 | .500 | 9 | 6 |
| Georgia State | 14 | 16 | .467 | 10 | – |
| Northeastern | 13 | 17 | .433 | 11 | – |
| William & Mary | 12 | 18 | .400 | 12 | – |
| James Madison | 10 | 20 | .333 | 14 | – |
| Old Dominion | 9 | 21 | .300 | 15 | – |

== Bracket ==
Upper round 1 | Upper round 2 | Upper final | Final
3 | Delaware | 11
6 | Towson | 7 | 2 | Hofstra | 3
3 | Delaware | 8 | 3 | Delaware | 2
1 | UNC Wilmington | 3
5 | VCU | 5
5 | VCU | 11 | 1 | UNC Wilmington | 8
4 | George Mason | 7
3 | Delaware | 11 | 8
1 | UNC Wilmington | 9 | 10
Lower round 1 | Lower round 2 | Lower round 3 | Lower final
3 | Delaware | 12
2 | Hofstra | 4 | 2 | Hofstra | 9
6 | Towson | 9 | 5 | VCU | 2
4 | George Mason | 8 | 5 | VCU | 14
6 | Towson | 16

== All-Tournament Team ==
The following players were named to the All-Tournament Team.

| Name | School |
|---|---|
| Jimmy Yezzo | Delaware |
| D. J. Long | Delaware |
| Alex Maruri | Delaware |
| Eric Young | Delaware |
| Matt Campbell | UNC Wilmington |
| Thomas Pope | UNC Wilmington |
| Tyler Molinaro | UNC Wilmington |
| Mat Batts | UNC Wilmington |
| Tyler McSwain | UNC Wilmington |
| Brent Mikionis | VCU |
| Zach Fisher | Towson |
| Zack Helgeson | George Mason |

=== Most Outstanding Player ===
Jimmy Yezzo was named Tournament Most Outstanding Player. Yezzo was a first baseman for Delaware, and set a tournament record with 15 hits while batting .571, scoring ten runs, and driving in 11.
