= 2014 Atlantic 10 Conference baseball tournament =

American college baseball tournament

- Teams: 7
- Format: Double-elimination
- Finals site: Billiken Sports Center; St. Louis, MO
- Champions: George Mason (1st title)
- Winning coach: Bill Brown (1st title)
- MVP: Luke Willis (George Mason)

2014 Atlantic 10 Conference baseball standings
| | Conf. | | | | | | Overall |
| Team | W | | L | | T | PCT | W | | L | | T | PCT |
|---|---|---|---|---|---|---|---|---|---|---|---|---|
| Saint Louis ‍†‍‍ | 18 | – | 7 | – | 1 | .712 | 34 | – | 21 | – | 1 | .616 |
| Saint Joseph's ‍‍‍ | 18 | – | 8 | – | 0 | .692 | 35 | – | 16 | – | 0 | .686 |
| George Mason ‍‍‡‍^{y} | 16 | – | 9 | – | 0 | .640 | 34 | – | 22 | – | 0 | .607 |
| VCU ‍‍‍ | 15 | – | 10 | – | 0 | .600 | 37 | – | 20 | – | 0 | .649 |
| Richmond ‍‍‍ | 13 | – | 12 | – | 0 | .520 | 24 | – | 28 | – | 1 | .462 |
| Dayton ‍‍‍ | 14 | – | 13 | – | 0 | .519 | 24 | – | 30 | – | 0 | .444 |
| Fordham ‍‍‍ | 13 | – | 14 | – | 0 | .481 | 24 | – | 30 | – | 0 | .444 |
| George Washington ‍‍‍ | 12 | – | 15 | – | 0 | .444 | 20 | – | 30 | – | 0 | .400 |
| UMass ‍‍‍ | 12 | – | 15 | – | 0 | .444 | 15 | – | 31 | – | 0 | .326 |
| La Salle ‍‍‍ | 9 | – | 15 | – | 1 | .380 | 14 | – | 34 | – | 1 | .296 |
| Rhode Island ‍‍‍ | 7 | – | 18 | – | 0 | .280 | 13 | – | 40 | – | 0 | .245 |
| St. Bonaventure ‍‍‍ | 6 | – | 17 | – | 0 | .261 | 12 | – | 30 | – | 0 | .286 |
† – Conference champion ‡ – Tournament champion y – Invited to the NCAA tournament As of June 7, 2014; Rankings from Collegiate Baseball

The 2014 Atlantic 10 Conference baseball tournament took place from May 21 through 24. The top seven regular season finishers of the league's twelve teams met in the double-elimination tournament held at Billiken Sports Center on the campus of the Saint Louis University in St. Louis. George Mason won their first Tournament championship in their first year of membership and earned the conference's automatic bid to the 2014 NCAA Division I baseball tournament.

== Seeding and format ==
The tournament used the same format from 2013, with the top seven finishers from the regular season seeded one through seven. The top seed received a single bye while remaining seeds played on the first day.

| Team | W | L | T | Pct | GB | Seed |
|---|---|---|---|---|---|---|
| Saint Louis | 18 | 7 | 1 | .712 | – | 1 |
| Saint Joseph's | 18 | 8 | 0 | .692 | .5 | 2 |
| George Mason | 16 | 9 | 0 | .640 | 2 | 3 |
| VCU | 15 | 10 | 0 | .600 | 3 | 4 |
| Richmond | 13 | 12 | 0 | .520 | 5 | 5 |
| Dayton | 14 | 13 | 0 | .519 | 5 | 6 |
| Fordham | 13 | 14 | 0 | .481 | 6 | 7 |
| George Washington | 12 | 15 | 0 | .444 | 7 | – |
| UMass | 12 | 15 | 0 | .444 | 7 | – |
| La Salle | 9 | 15 | 1 | .380 | 8.5 | – |
| Rhode Island | 7 | 18 | 0 | .280 | 11 | – |
| St. Bonaventure | 6 | 17 | 0 | .261 | 11 | – |

== Results ==
Upper round 1 | Upper round 2 | Upper final | Final
1 | Saint Louis | 4
4 | VCU | 9
4 | VCU | 5
5 | Richmond | 2
4 | VCU | 0
3 | George Mason | 3
2 | Saint Joseph's | 9
7 | Fordham | 4
2 | Saint Joseph's | 4
3 | George Mason | 5
3 | George Mason | 4
6 | Dayton | 3
3 | George Mason | 3 | –
4 | VCU | 2 | –
Lower round 1 | Lower round 2 | Lower round 3 | Lower final
7 | Fordham | 2
7 | Fordham | 4 | 1 | Saint Louis | 12 | 1 | Saint Louis | 6
6 | Dayton | 3 | 1 | Saint Louis | 9 | 4 | VCU | 8
2 | Saint Joseph's | 1
5 | Richmond | 2
2 | Saint Joseph's | 12

== All-Tournament Team ==
The following players were named to the All-Tournament Team.

Saint Louis's Michael Bozarth, also chosen in 2013, was a second-time selection.

| Name | School |
|---|---|
| Luke Willis | George Mason |
| Jared Gaynor | George Mason |
| Tyler Zombro | George Mason |
| Anthony Montefusco | George Mason |
| Tim Swatek | Fordham |
| Michael Bozarth | Saint Louis |
| Damien Rivera | Saint Louis |
| Brian O’Keefe | Saint Joseph’s |
| Collin Forgey | Saint Joseph’s |
| Bill Cullen | VCU |
| Matt Davis | VCU |

=== Most Outstanding Player ===
Luke Willis was named Tournament Most Outstanding Player. Willis was an outfielder for George Mason.
