= Eagle Field at Veterans Memorial Park =

Baseball venue in Harrisonburg, Virginia

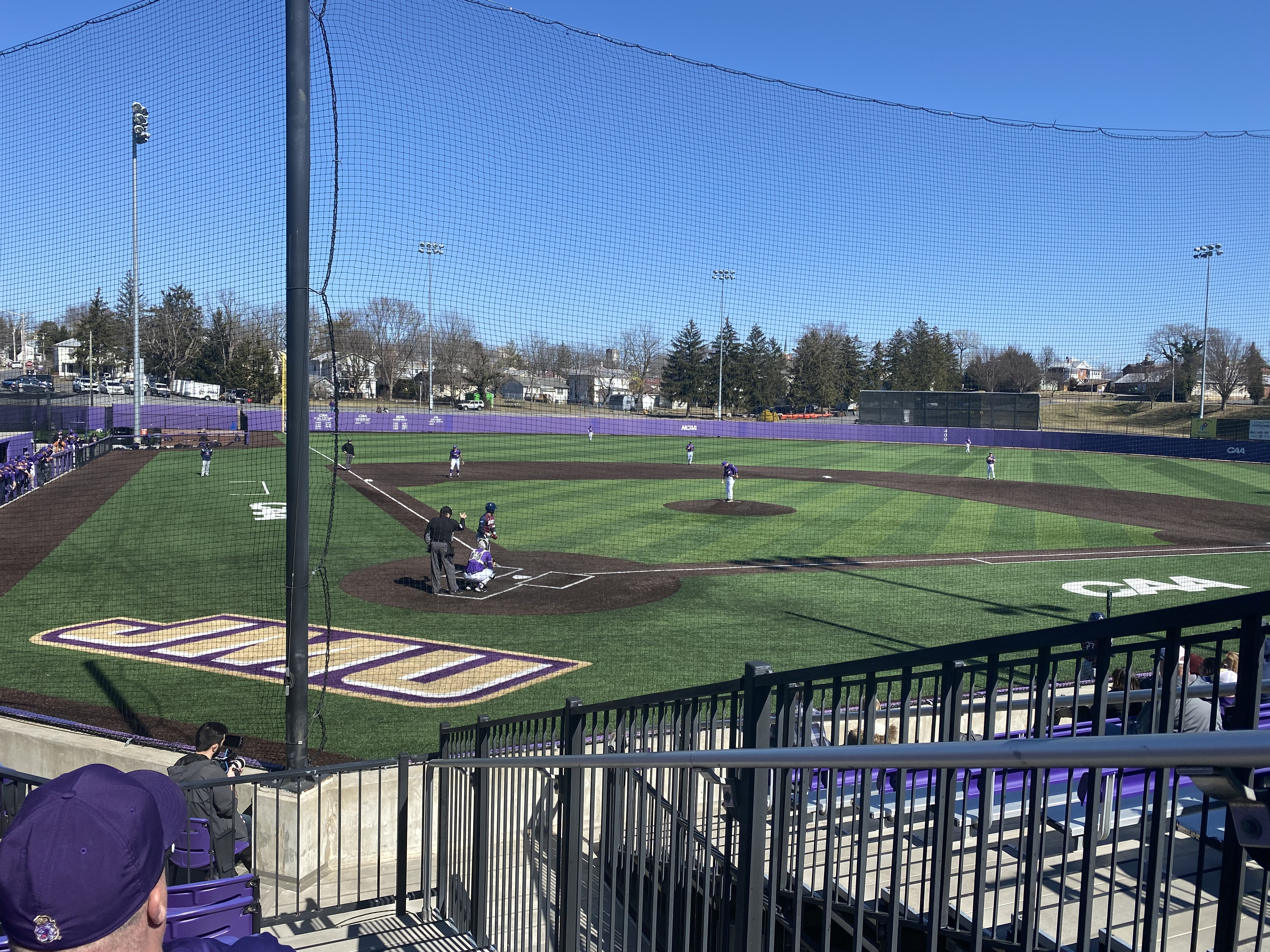
- Interactive map of Eagle Field at Veterans Memorial Park
- Location: 395 S. High Street, Harrisonburg, Virginia, USA
- Coordinates: 38.44585°N 78.87799°W
- Capacity: 1,200 (baseball)
- Surface: AstroTurf GameDay Grass 3D
- Scoreboard: Electronic
- Record attendance: 1,815 (March 17, 2010, vs. Virginia)
- Field size: 340 ft. (LF), 400 ft. (CF), 320 ft. (RF)

Construction
- Built: 2008-10
- Opened: 2010
- Cost: $9 million

Tenants
- James Madison Dukes baseball (NCAA D1) (2010–present); Harrisonburg Turks (VBL) (2010–present); CAA Tournament (2012,2019)

Eagle Field at Veterans Memorial Park is a baseball venue in Harrisonburg, Virginia, United States. It is home to the James Madison Dukes baseball team of the NCAA Division I Colonial Athletic Association. James Madison University joined the Sun Belt Conference in 2022. The Harrisonburg Turks of the collegiate summer Valley Baseball League also use the field, which opened in March 2010 and has a capacity of 1,200 spectators.

== History ==
The location of Eagle Field has been used for baseball since the 1940s. In 1948, its predecessor was dedicated Veterans Memorial Park in honor of Harrisonburg-area veterans who died in World War II. The Valley Baseball League's Harrisonburg Turks used the previous field through the end of the 2008 season, when construction began on the current facility. Construction on the current, $9 million facility took place from 2008 until it opened in March 2010.

On March 17, 2010, 1,815 spectators attended a James Madison game against Virginia to set the facility's attendance record.

== Features ==
The field's features include an AstroTurf GameDay Grass 3D surface, bullpens, and dugouts. A net lines the infield portion of foul territory to protect spectators from foul balls. In addition, the facility includes chairback seats, a press box, restrooms, concessions, landscaping, and plaques in honor of the Dukes' postseason accomplishments.

A monument commemorating war veterans from Rockingham County was dedicated in fall 2009 and stands at the entrance to the facility.

The university's softball facility, also a part of the Veterans Memorial Park complex, is next to Eagle Field. Offices, indoor workout facilities, and locker rooms for the team are housed in Memorial Hall, also located near the field.

== Events ==
On July 11, 2011, the venue hosted the Mid-Atlantic Classic, an exhibition game played between the All-Star teams of the collegiate summer Valley Baseball League and Cal Ripken Collegiate Baseball League. In July 2014, it will host the Valley League All-Star Game.

The field also hosted the CAA Tournament in 2012. One-seed UNC Wilmington won the tournament.

== See also ==
- List of NCAA Division I baseball venues
