= Old Dominion Monarchs baseball, 2010–2019 =

American college baseball seasons

Old Dominion Monarchs baseball represents Old Dominion University in college baseball at the NCAA Division I level.

== 2010 ==
2010 Old Dominion Monarchs baseball
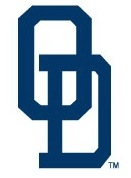
- Conference: Colonial Athletic Association
- Record: 24-30 (11-13 CAA)
- Head coach: Jerry Meyers (6th season)
- Assistant coach: Tag Montague (1st season)
- Home stadium: Bud Metheny Baseball Complex

2010 Colonial Athletic Association baseball standings
	Conf.						Overall
Team	W		L		T	PCT	W		L		T	PCT
James Madison ‍†‍‍	18	–	6	–	0	.750	30	–	23	–	0	.566
Georgia State ‍‍‍	17	–	6	–	1	.729	34	–	23	–	1	.595
VCU ‍‍‡‍^{y}	16	–	7	–	1	.688	34	–	26	–	1	.566
UNC Wilmington ‍‍‍	13	–	11	–	0	.542	33	–	27	–	0	.550
George Mason ‍‍‍	11	–	13	–	0	.458	28	–	22	–	0	.560
Old Dominion ‍‍‍	11	–	13	–	0	.458	24	–	30	–	0	.444
Towson ‍‍‍	11	–	13	–	0	.458	19	–	36	–	0	.345
William & Mary ‍‍‍	10	–	14	–	0	.417	27	–	24	–	0	.529
Hofstra ‍‍‍	10	–	14	–	0	.417	20	–	28	–	1	.418
Delaware ‍‍‍	9	–	15	–	0	.375	27	–	24	–	0	.529
Northeastern ‍‍‍	5	–	19	–	0	.208	13	–	31	–	0	.295
† – Conference champion ‡ – Tournament champion y – Invited to the NCAA tournament As of June 30, 2010; Rankings from Collegiate Baseball

The 2010 Old Dominion Monarchs baseball team represents Old Dominion University in the 2010 NCAA Division I baseball season. The Monarchs play their home games at Bud Metheny Baseball Complex, which was named for former coach Bud Metheny.

2010 was the last season under Head Coach Jerry Meyers after six years. During the 2010 season the Monarchs finished sixth in the conference, their third straight losing season under Meyers. After the season Coach Meyers left ODU to return to South Carolina to take back his old job of pitching coach.

2010 was the first time since 2005 that ODU did not make it to the CAA Baseball Tournament. The team won 17 of its 24 victories at home at the Bud Metheny Baseball Complex. Also during the season CJ Huyett pitched one of the two 9 inning no hitters by a single pitcher in ODU history in an 18–0 win over UMES on May 11, 2010.

=== Drafted players ===
C Joe Velleggia – Baltimore Orioles

Velleggia was drafted in 2009 also by the Orioles almost 200 picks ahead of where he went in 2010.

== 2011 ==
2011 Old Dominion Monarchs baseball
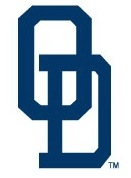
- Conference: Colonial Athletic Association
- Record: 30-26 (19-11 CAA)
- Head coach: Nate Goulet (1st season)
- Assistant coaches: Tag Montague (2nd season); Justin Haywood (1st season)
- Pitching coach: Tim Lavigne (1st season)
- Home stadium: Bud Metheny Baseball Complex

2011 Colonial Athletic Association baseball standings
	Conf.				Overall
Team	W		L	PCT	W		L	PCT
James Madison ‍†‍‡‍^{y}	21	–	9	.700	40	–	17	.702
Old Dominion ‍‍‍	19	–	11	.633	30	–	26	.536
UNC Wilmington ‍‍‍	18	–	12	.600	31	–	28	.525
Georgia State ‍‍‍	17	–	13	.567	37	–	21	.638
Delaware ‍‍‍	16	–	14	.533	27	–	26	.509
William & Mary ‍‍‍	16	–	14	.533	26	–	29	.473
Towson ‍‍‍	15	–	15	.500	26	–	28	.481
VCU ‍‍‍	12	–	18	.400	22	–	32	.407
Northeastern ‍‍‍	12	–	18	.400	18	–	32	.360
Hofstra ‍‍‍	12	–	18	.400	15	–	32	.319
George Mason ‍‍‍	7	–	23	.233	21	–	32	.396
† – Conference champion ‡ – Tournament champion y – Invited to the NCAA tournament As of June 30, 2013; Rankings from Collegiate Baseball

The 2011 Old Dominion Monarchs baseball team represented Old Dominion University in the 2011 NCAA Division I baseball season. The Monarchs play their home games at Bud Metheny Baseball Complex, which was named for former coach Bud Metheny.

After the 2010 season ODU Head Coach Jerry Meyers left for South Carolina. The team then hired Nate Goulet as their interim coach for the entire 2011 season. Despite only being an interim coach, Goulet lead ODU to the CAA Championship game and earned CAA Coach of the Year honors. The 2010 Monarchs went 30–26 overall and 19–11 in conference, finishing second in the conference standings to regular season and tournament champion James Madison.

After the season despite leading ODU back to the conference title game and winning conference coach of the year, the Monarchs did not renew the contract of interim head coach Goulet.

=== Draft selections ===
- LHP Kyle Hald – 18th Round, 560th Overall St. Louis Cardinals

=== Awards ===
- Freshman All-American

Joey Burney 1B/DH

- ABCA All-East Region

Kyle Hald P

- CAA Player of the Year

Kyle Hald

- All-CAA Selections

Kyle Hald P
Josh Wright SS
Adam Wisniewski P
Joey Burney IF All-Freshman Team
Dean Ali P All-Freshman Team

== 2012 ==
2012 Old Dominion Monarchs baseball
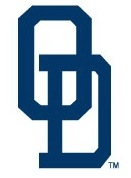
- Conference: Colonial Athletic Association
- Record: 19-34 (9-21 CAA)
- Head coach: Chris Finwood (1st season)
- Assistant coach: Karl Nonemaker (1st season)
- Pitching coach: Tim Lavigne (2nd season)
- MVP: Josh Wright
- Home stadium: Bud Metheny Baseball Complex

2012 Colonial Athletic Association baseball standings
	Conf.						Overall
Team	W		L		T	PCT	W		L		T	PCT
UNC Wilmington ‍†‍‡‍^{y}	24	–	6	–	0	.800	39	–	23	–	0	.629
Hofstra ‍‍‍	20	–	10	–	0	.667	34	–	22	–	0	.607
Delaware ‍‍‍	17	–	13	–	0	.567	31	–	27	–	0	.534
George Mason ‍‍‍	16	–	14	–	0	.533	33	–	24	–	0	.579
VCU ‍‍‍	15	–	15	–	0	.500	34	–	25	–	0	.576
Towson ‍‍‍	15	–	15	–	0	.500	27	–	31	–	0	.466
Georgia State ‍‍‍	14	–	16	–	0	.467	24	–	31	–	0	.436
Northeastern ‍‍‍	13	–	17	–	0	.433	23	–	28	–	0	.451
William & Mary ‍‍‍	12	–	18	–	0	.400	31	–	25	–	0	.554
James Madison ‍‍‍	10	–	20	–	0	.333	16	–	35	–	2	.321
Old Dominion ‍‍‍	9	–	21	–	0	.300	19	–	34	–	0	.358
† – Conference champion ‡ – Tournament champion y – Invited to the NCAA tournament As of June 30, 2012; Rankings from Collegiate Baseball

The 2012 Old Dominion Monarchs baseball team represents Old Dominion University in the 2012 NCAA Division I baseball season. The Monarchs play their home games at Bud Metheny Baseball Complex, which was named for former coach Bud Metheny.

Old Dominion did not renew the contract of 2011 interim head coach Nate Goulet who replaced Jerry Meyers when he left prior to the 2011 season for South Carolina.

In 2012, the Monarchs hired Chris Finwood, the then head coach at Western Kentucky. Finwood lead the Hilltoppers to back to back NCAA regional appearances, a Sun Belt conference tournament championship and a regular season championship. In Finwood's first season the Monarchs won only 19 games and finished in last place in the CAA. Finwood hired his assistant coach Karl Nonemaker from Monmouth University and retained the pitching coach from ODU's 2011 season Tim LaVigne.

=== Roster ===
2012 Old Dominion Monarchs roster
Pitchers: 8 – Donald Engler – Fr; 15 – Phil McCarthy – Sr; 16 – Brett Harris – (redshirt) Jr; 22 – Bryan Ramirez – Fr; 25 – Ben Tomchick – Sr; 26 – CJ Huyett – (redshirt) Sr; 27 – Dean Ali – So; 29 – Mike Ney – Jr; 33 – Erick Baker – (redshirt) Jr; 36 – Connor Overton – Fr; 37 – Brandon Smith – Jr; 41 – Dylan Bratton – Fr; 42 – Kevin Griffey – Fr	Catchers: 7 – Josh Tutwiler – (redshirt) Sr; 18 – Michael Perez – Fr; 39 – Tyler Smith – So; Infielders: 1 – Brian Bashara – So; 4 – Austin McGowan – Jr; 6 – Josh Wright – (redshirt) Sr; 9 – Ty Yesensky – So; 10 – Chris Baker – (redshirt) Sr; 11 – Joey Burney – So; 19 – Brandon Shelton – Sr; 34 – Brent Frazier – Sr	Outfielders: 2 – Drew Coker – (redshirt) So; 12 – Kenneth Belgrave – Jr; 14 – Shawn Sizemore – (redshirt) Jr; 24 – Josh Eldridge – Fr; 32 – Ben Verlander – So

=== Coaches ===
2012 Old Dominion Monarchs baseball coaching staff
- 5 – Chris Finwood – Head coach – 1st Season
- 12 – Karl Nonemaker – Assistant coach – 1st Season
- 21 – Paul Bottigliero – Volunteer coach – 1st Season
- 44 – Tim LaVigne – Pitching coach – 2nd Season

=== Awards ===
- All-CAA Selection

Josh Tutwiler C 3rd Team
Josh Wright SS 3rd Team
Josh Eldridge OF All-Freshman Team

== 2013 ==
2013 Old Dominion Monarchs baseball
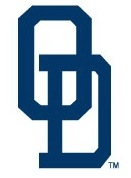
- Conference: Colonial Athletic Association
- Record: 30-24 (15-12 CAA)
- Head coach: Chris Finwood (2nd season)
- Assistant coach: Karl Nonemaker (2nd season)
- Pitching coach: Tim Lavigne (3rd season)
- MVP: Ben Verlander
- Captain: Austin McGowan
- Home stadium: Bud Metheny Baseball Complex

2013 Colonial Athletic Association baseball standings
	Conf.				Overall
Team	W		L	PCT	W		L	PCT
UNC Wilmington ‍†‍‍^{y}	18	–	8	.692	38	–	23	.623
William & Mary ‍‍‍^{y}	17	–	10	.630	39	–	24	.619
Delaware ‍‍‍	15	–	12	.556	33	–	22	.600
Old Dominion ‍‍‍	15	–	12	.556	30	–	24	.556
Georgia State ‍‍‍	14	–	13	.519	35	–	21	.625
Towson ‍‍‡‍^{y}	14	–	13	.519	30	–	30	.500
Northeastern ‍‍‍	12	–	15	.444	31	–	26	.544
James Madison ‍‍‍	11	–	15	.423	25	–	30	.455
Hofstra ‍‍‍	11	–	16	.407	26	–	27	.491
George Mason ‍‍‍	7	–	20	.259	18	–	35	.340
† – Conference champion ‡ – Tournament champion y – Invited to the NCAA tournament As of June 30, 2013; Rankings from Collegiate Baseball

The 2013 Old Dominion Monarchs baseball team represents Old Dominion University in the 2013 NCAA Division I baseball season. The Monarchs play their home games at Bud Metheny Baseball Complex, which was named for former coach Bud Metheny.

The Monarchs announced prior to the start of the 2013 CAA season that Old Dominion would be leaving the CAA for Conference USA for the 2014 season. CAA officials announced that three teams from the CAA would be ineligible for the conference tournament including ODU, George Mason, and Georgia State, all of which were leaving the CAA for other conferences in 2014. VCU had already departed the CAA for the Atlantic 10 before the 2013 season and thus the CAA only had 11 teams, 9 of which were eligible for the 8 team CAA tournament.

ODU finished the season with 30 wins for the second time in three years. The Monarchs would have had the third seed in the conference tournament with a tiebreaker with Delaware if they had been eligible, a turn around from finishing with 19 wins and last place in the conference a season before.

=== Roster ===
2013 Old Dominion Monarchs roster
Pitchers: 13 – Brad Gero – Jr; 15 – Andy Roberts – Jr; 16 – Brett Harris – (redshirt) Jr; 20 – Tommy Alexander – Fr; 25 – Ryan Yarbrough – Jr; 27 – Dean Ali – Jr; 28 – Jake Josephs – Fr; 29 – Mike Ney – (redshirt) Sr; 31 – Mitch Moynihan – Fr; 33 – Erick Baker – (redshirt) Sr; 34 – Vic Díaz Jr – (redshirt) So; 36 – Connor Overton – So; 37 – Brandon Smith – Sr	Catchers: 17 – Alex Kowalczyk – Fr; 18 – Mike Perez – So; 26 – Chris Livers – Fr; Infielders: 1 – Brian Bashara – Jr; 4 – Austin McGowan – Sr; 6 – Pat Kane – Fr; 7 – PJ Higgins – Fr; 8 – Tyler Urps – Jr; 11 – Joey Burney – Jr; 22 – Jordan Negrini – Jr	Outfielders: 2 – Drew Coker – Sr; 9 – Connor Myers – Fr; 10 – Brian Beard – Fr; 14 – Shawn Sizemore – (redshirt) Sr; 23 – Ben Slaton – Jr; 24 – Josh Eldridge – So; 32 – Ben Verlander – Jr; 38 – Dylan Hill – Fr

=== Coaches ===
2013 Old Dominion Monarchs baseball coaching staff
- 5 – Chris Finwood – Head coach – 2nd Season
- 12 – Karl Nonemaker – Assistant coach – 2nd Season
- 21 – Paul Bottigliero – Volunteer coach – 2nd Season
- 44 – Tim LaVigne – Pitching coach – 3rd Season

=== Awards ===
- All-Conference Selections

Ben Verlander OF (1st team)
Tommy Alexander (All-Freshman)
PJ Higgins (All-Freshman)
Connor Myers (All-Freshman)

- All-American

Ben Verlander

- ABCA All-Region

Ben Verlander

=== Drafted Players ===
OF Ben Verlander – 14th Round, 426th Overall Detroit Tigers
LHP Ryan Yarbrough – 20th Round, 602nd Overall Milwaukee Brewers, Did not sign

== 2014 ==
2014 Old Dominion Monarchs baseball
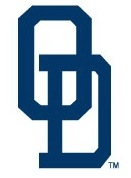

3 Seed, Columbia Regional
- Conference: Conference USA
- Record: 36-26 (17-13 C-USA)
- Head coach: Chris Finwood (3rd season)
- Assistant coach: Karl Nonemaker (3rd season)
- Pitching coach: Tim Lavigne (4th season)
- MVP: Joey Burney
- Captain: Joey Burney
- Home stadium: Bud Metheny Baseball Complex

2014 Conference USA baseball standings
	Conf.						Overall
Team	W		L		T	PCT	W		L		T	PCT
No. 26 Rice ‍†‍‡‍^{y}	23	–	7	–	0	.767	42	–	20	–	0	.677
UAB ‍‍‍	20	–	10	–	0	.667	35	–	21	–	0	.625
Southern Miss ‍‍‍	19	–	11	–	0	.633	35	–	25	–	0	.583
Middle Tennessee ‍‍‍	17	–	13	–	0	.567	31	–	27	–	0	.534
Old Dominion ‍‍‍^{y}	17	–	13	–	0	.567	36	–	26	–	0	.581
East Carolina ‍‍‍	16	–	14	–	0	.533	33	–	26	–	0	.559
UTSA ‍‍‍	16	–	14	–	0	.533	35	–	26	–	0	.574
FIU ‍‍‍	16	–	14	–	0	.533	36	–	20	–	0	.643
Florida Atlantic ‍‍‍	14	–	16	–	0	.467	28	–	25	–	0	.528
Tulane ‍‍‍	10	–	18	–	0	.357	23	–	29	–	0	.442
Marshall ‍‍‍	10	–	19	–	0	.345	20	–	31	–	0	.392
Charlotte ‍‍‍	10	–	19	–	0	.345	19	–	31	–	1	.382
Louisiana Tech ‍‍‍	5	–	25	–	0	.167	15	–	35	–	0	.300
† – Conference champion ‡ – Tournament champion y – Invited to the NCAA tournament Rankings from Collegiate Baseball

The 2014 Old Dominion Monarchs baseball team represents Old Dominion University in the 2014 NCAA Division I baseball season. The Monarchs play their home games at Bud Metheny Baseball Complex, which was named for former coach Bud Metheny.

The 2014 season was the Monarchs first season as members of Conference USA. They were picked by the coaches in the preseason to finish 10th in the conference but ended the season tied for 4th. Their 17 conference wins is fourth most in ODU baseball history. They opened the conference tournament against fourth seed Middle Tennessee State whom they lost to before winning their next three. In those games ODU knocked out FIU and Middle Tennessee in back to back games, and then defeated Rice in the semifinals on a walk-off single and throwing error forcing a rematch. In their next game against Rice the Monarchs lost which sent the Owls to the title game where they defeated UTSA for the championship.

The Monarchs won 30 games in back to back seasons for the first time since the 2006 and 2007 teams and had the schools highest win total since the 2006 team that won 39 games. During the season ODU defeated top ranked Virginia 8–1 at Harbor Park for their first win over a #1 team in school history. The team earned an at-large berth in the 2014 NCAA Division I baseball tournament and were given the third seed in the Columbia Regional but lost both of their games 3–4 to Maryland and 1–4 to Campbell. It was the Monarchs 8th appearance in the NCAA tournament all-time since joining Division I in 1977 and their first since the 2000 season. Defensively the Monarchs turned 68 double plays, which set a new school record and ranked 3rd nationally in 2014.

The team did not lose more than two games in a row during the regular season and won six of their conference series with one sweep over Marshall and only lost four series without being swept. The team's longest losing streak of the season came in post season play where they lost their last game in the conference tournament and then were 0–2 in the NCAA Regional, ending the season with three straight loses.

Team MVP and Captain 1B Joey Burney was named 2nd team all conference, which along with his 2010 CAA All-Freshman selection made him the second Monarch to win all-conference honors in multiple conferences, along with TJ O'Donnell who did it in 1991 as an outfielder in the Sun Belt Conference and in 1992 as a shortstop in the CAA. All VASID and ABCA All-Region relief pitcher Brad Gero broke the single-season ODU record for appearances with 39.

=== Roster ===
2014 Old Dominion Monarchs roster
Pitchers: 13 – Brad Gero – Sr; 15 – Andy Roberts – Sr; 16 – Brett Harris – (redshirt) Sr; 20 – Tommy Alexander – So; 25 – Ryan Yarbrough – Sr; 27 – Dean Ali – Sr; 28 – Jake Josephs – So; 30 – Zach Sligh – Fr; 31 – Mitch Moynihan – So; 32 – Victor Diaz – (redshirt) Jr; 33 – Turner Bishop – Fr; 34 – Sam Sinnen – Fr; 36 – Connor Overton – (redshirt) So; 37 – Greg Tomchick – Jr; 40 – Adam Bainbridge – Fr; 42 – Joey Benitez – Fr	Catchers: 14 – Kurt Sinnen – Fr; 26 – Chris Livers – So; 29 – Mike Perez – Jr; Infielders: 1 – Brian Bashara – Sr; 2 – Tyler Urps – Sr; 4 – Nick Walker – Fr; 7 – PJ Higgins – So; 11 – Josiah Burney – Sr; 22 – Jordan Negrini – Sr	Outfielders: 8 – Joseph Guaragna – Fr; 9 – Connor Myers – So; 10 – Brian Beard – So; 17 – Taylor Ostrich – Jr; 23 – Ben Slaton – Sr; 24 – Josh Eldridge – Sr; 38 – Dylan Hill – So

=== Coaches ===
2014 Old Dominion Monarchs baseball coaching staff
- 5 – Chris Finwood – Head coach – 3rd Season
- 12 – Karl Nonemaker – Assistant coach – 3rd Season
- 21 – Paul Bottigliero – Volunteer coach – 3rd Season
- 44 – Tim LaVigne – Pitching coach – 4th Season

=== Awards ===
- Freshman All-American

Nick Walker OF

- All-Conference USA Selections

Nick Walker OF (First Team)
Nick Walker (All-Freshman)
Josiah Burney 1B (Second Team)

- All-Conference USA Tournament Selections

Tyler Urps IF
Nick Walker OF

- All-Regional Team

Tyler Urps SS

- VA SID All-State Team

Brad Gero RP
Nick Walker OF

- ABCA All-East Region

Brad Gero RHP

- ABCA Regional Coach of the Year

Chris Finwood – East Region

=== Drafted players ===
LHP Ryan Yarbrough – 4th Round, 111th Overall Seattle Mariners
RHP Connor Overton – 15th Round, 437th Overall Miami Marlins

=== Game log ===
2014 Old Dominion Monarchs baseball game log
Regular season

February
Date	Opponent	Site/stadium	Score	Pitcher of Record	Attendance	Overall record	C-USA record
Feb 14	Georgia Tech	Russ Chandler Stadium	5–6	Ali (0–1)	1021	0–1	0-0
Feb 15	VCU	Russ Chandler Stadium	3–6	Gero (0–1)		0–2	0-0
Feb 16	Radford	Russ Chandler Stadium	8-7(10)	Gero (1–1)		1–2	0-0
Feb 18	Liberty	Al Worthington Stadium	7–4	Ali (1–1)	1142	2–2	0-0
Feb 19	VCU	The Diamond	6–4	Sinnen, S (1–0)	280	3–2	0-0
Feb 21	St. John's	Bud Metheny Baseball Complex	6–4	Yarbrough (1–0)	280	4–2	0-0
Feb 22	Kentucky	Bud Metheny Baseball Complex	5–7	Ali (1–2)	390	4–3	0-0
Feb 23	Saint Joseph's	Bud Metheny Baseball Complex	16-1	Roberts (1–0)	685	5–3	0-0
Feb 25	Richmond	Malcolm U. Pitt Field	3–0	Diaz (1–0)	105	6–3	0-0

March
Date	Opponent	Site/stadium	Score	Pitcher of Record	Attendance	Overall record	C-USA record
Mar 1	Rutgers	Bud Metheny Baseball Complex	2–4	Yarbrough (1–1)	322	6–4	0-0
Mar 1	Rutgers	Bud Metheny Baseball Complex	12–3	Alexander (1–0)	322	7–4	0-0
Mar 2	Rutgers	Bud Metheny Baseball Complex	12–6	Ali (2–2)	532	8–4	0-0
Mar 7	#17 Rice	Reckling Park	1–4	Yarbrough (1–2)	2001	8–5	0-1
Mar 8	#17 Rice	Reckling Park	2–3 (17)	Diaz (1–1)	2043	8–6	0-2
Mar 8	#17 Rice	Reckling Park	2–1 (10)	Gero (2–1)	2043	9–6	1-2
Mar 11	VMI	Bud Metheny Baseball Complex	5–4	Tomchick, G (1–0)	752	10–6	1-2
Mar 12	VMI	Bud Metheny Baseball Complex	15–5	Bishop (1–0)	350	11–6	1-2
Mar 14	UAB	Bud Metheny Baseball Complex	2–4	Yarbrough (1–3)	552	11–7	1-3
Mar 15	UAB	Bud Metheny Baseball Complex	6–8	Gero (2–2)	412	11–8	1-4
Mar 16	UAB	Bud Metheny Baseball Complex	4–1	Roberts (2–0)	338	12–8	2-4
Mar 19	Liberty	Bud Metheny Baseball Complex	0–1 (16)	Harris (0–1)	295	12–9	2-4
Mar 21	Louisiana Tech	J.C. Love Field	8–6	Ali (3–2)	461	13–9	3-4
Mar 22	Louisiana Tech	J.C. Love Field	6–9 (12)	Yarbrough (1–4)	462	13–10	3-5
Mar 22	Louisiana Tech	J.C. Love Field	7–2	Bishop (2–0)	462	14–10	4-5
Mar 28	Charlotte	Bud Metheny Baseball Complex	7–2	Yarbrough (2–4)	412	15–10	5-5
Mar 29	Charlotte	Bud Metheny Baseball Complex	6–2	Ali (4–2)	366	16–10	6-5
Mar 30	Charlotte	Bud Metheny Baseball Complex	4–11	Benitez (0–1)	298	16–11	6-6

April
Date	Opponent	Site/stadium	Score	Pitcher of Record	Attendance	Overall record	C-USA record
Apr 1	#1 Virginia	Davenport Field	1–7	Tomchick, G (1–1)	3422	16–12	6-6
Apr 2	William & Mary	Bud Metheny Baseball Complex	20–5	Gero (3–2)	601	17–12	6-6
Apr 4	FIU	FIU Baseball Stadium	2–1	Roberts (3–0)	518	18–12	7-6
Apr 5	FIU	FIU Baseball Stadium	4–2	Yarbrough (3–4)	522	19–12	8-6
Apr 6	FIU	FIU Baseball Stadium	0–1	Diaz (1–2)	412	19–13	8-7
Apr 8	Wofford	Russell C. King Field	1–4	Overton (0–1)	436	19–14	8-7
Apr 9	Wofford	Russell C. King Field	15–2	Bishop (3–0)	353	20–14	8-7
Apr 11	East Carolina	Bud Metheny Baseball Complex	7–3	Overton (1–1)	1751	21–14	9-7
Apr 12	East Carolina	Bud Metheny Baseball Complex	9–5	Yarbrough (4–4)	992	22–14	10-7
Apr 13	East Carolina	Bud Metheny Baseball Complex	7–12 (12)	Tomchick (1–2)	727	22–15	10-8
Apr 17	UTSA	Bud Metheny Baseball Complex	0–5	Roberts (3–1)	357	22–16	10-9
Apr 18	UTSA	Bud Metheny Baseball Complex	10–1	Yarbrough (5–4)	703	23–16	11-9
Apr 18	UTSA	Bud Metheny Baseball Complex	4–2	Diaz (2–2)	703	24–16	12-9
Apr 21	ECU	Clark-LeClair Stadium	5–3	Benitez (1–1)	2061	25–16	12-9
Apr 25	Middle Tennessee	Reese Smith Jr. Field	0–1	Roberts (3–2)	828	25–17	12-10
Apr 26	Middle Tennessee	Reese Smith Jr. Field	8–11	Yarbrough (5–5)	905	25–18	12-11
Apr 27	Middle Tennessee	Reese Smith Jr. Field	4-3(7)	Overton (2–1)	684	26–18	13-11
Apr 29	#1 Virginia	Harbor Park	8–1	Harris (1–1)	2937	27–18	13-11

May
Date	Opponent	Site/stadium	Score	Pitcher of Record	Attendance	Overall record	C-USA record
May 2	Florida Atlantic	Bud Metheny Baseball Complex	4–9	Roberts (3–3)	825	27–19	13-12
May 3	Florida Atlantic	Bud Metheny Baseball Complex	7–8	Overton (2–2)	729	27–20	13-13
May 4	Florida Atlantic	Bud Metheny Baseball Complex	12–1	Diaz (3–2)	472	28–20	14-13
May 9	Marshall	Appalachian Power Park	6–3	Ali (5–2)	231	29–20	15-13
May 11	Marshall	Appalachian Power Park	9–1	Roberts (4–3)	342	30–20	16-13
May 11	Marshall	Appalachian Power Park	8–3	Diaz (4–2)	342	31–20	17-13
May 13	VMI	Gray–Minor Stadium	3–4	Yarbrough (5–6)	119	31–20	17-13
May 16	LIU Brooklyn	Bud Metheny Baseball Complex	7–3	Roberts (5–3)	551	32–21	17-13
May 17	LIU Brooklyn	Bud Metheny Baseball Complex	5–2	Yarbrough (6–6)	696	33–21	17-13
May 17	LIU Brooklyn	Bud Metheny Baseball Complex	2–4 (10)	Gero (3–3)	696	33–22	17-13

Postseason

Conference USA Tournament
Date	Opponent	Site/stadium	Score	Pitcher of Record	Attendance	Overall record	Tournament record
May 21	Middle Tennessee	Pete Taylor Park	2–3	Yarbrough (6–7)	1658	33–23	0-1
May 22	FIU	Pete Taylor Park	3–2	Roberts (6–3)	1829	34–23	1-1
May 23	Middle Tennessee	Pete Taylor Park	2–1	Diaz (5–2)	2295	35–23	2-1
May 24	#16 Rice	Pete Taylor Park	3–2	Overton (3–2)	2124	36–23	3-1
May 24	#16 Rice	Pete Taylor Park	5–7	Bishop (3–1)	2255	36–24	3-2

NCAA tournament

Columbia Regional
Date	Opponent	Site/stadium	Score	Pitcher of Record	Attendance	Overall record	Regional Record
May 30	Maryland	Carolina Stadium	3–4	Gero (3–4)	5178	36–25	0-1
May 31	Campbell	Carolina Stadium	1–4 (12)	Overton (3–3)	5240	36–26	0-2

== 2015 ==
2015 Old Dominion Monarchs baseball
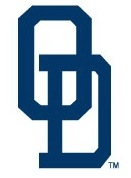
- Conference: Conference USA
- Record: 27-29 (13-17 C-USA)
- Head coach: Chris Finwood (4th season)
- Assistant coach: Karl Nonemaker (4th season)
- Pitching coach: Tim Lavigne (5th season)
- Home stadium: Bud Metheny Baseball Complex

2015 Conference USA baseball standings
	Conf.						Overall
Team	W		L		T	PCT	W		L		T	PCT
No. 20 Rice ‍†‍‍^{y}	22	–	8	–	0	.733	35	–	18	–	0	.660
#24 Florida Atlantic ^{y} ‍‍‍	19	–	10	–	0	.655	38	–	15	–	0	.717
Southern Miss ‍‍‍	19	–	10	–	0	.655	35	–	16	–	1	.683
Middle Tennessee ‍‍‍	19	–	11	–	0	.633	30	–	25	–	0	.545
UTSA ‍‍‍	17	–	13	–	0	.567	32	–	23	–	0	.582
UAB ‍‍‍	15	–	15	–	0	.500	30	–	24	–	0	.556
Old Dominion ‍‍‍	13	–	17	–	0	.433	27	–	27	–	0	.500
FIU ‍‍‡‍^{y}	13	–	17	–	0	.433	25	–	29	–	0	.463
Marshall ‍‍‍	12	–	18	–	0	.400	20	–	32	–	0	.385
Charlotte ‍‍‍	11	–	19	–	0	.367	19	–	29	–	0	.396
WKU ‍‍‍	10	–	19	–	0	.345	24	–	28	–	0	.462
Louisiana Tech ‍‍‍	8	–	21	–	0	.276	25	–	27	–	0	.481
† – Conference champion ‡ – Tournament champion y – Invited to the NCAA tournament As of May 5, 2015; Rankings from Collegiate Baseball

The 2015 Old Dominion Monarchs baseball team represents Old Dominion University in the 2015 NCAA Division I baseball season. The Monarchs play their home games at Bud Metheny Baseball Complex, which was named for former coach Bud Metheny.

In the preseason rankings by league coaches the 2015 Monarchs were picked to finish 3rd in the conference standings. INF PJ Higgins and INF/OF Nick Walker were selected preseason All-Conference. In 2014 the Monarchs were selected to finish 10th before ending the season tied for 4th. The 2015 schedule includes eight match ups against ranked opponents from 2014; Regional host Rice, National Runner-up UVA and other NCAA tournament participants in Liberty and a rematch from the first game of the Columbia Regional against Super Regional participant Maryland.

The Monarchs 2015 season included wins over two top 10 teams, beating #1 Virginia and winning the conference series from #8 Rice as well as defeating Virginia again when the team was ranked #22. The team also played and was defeated by then #18 Maryland and lost the series to #14 FAU making their record against ranked teams 5–4. In conference play the Monarchs won their series against Rice, FIU and swept LA Tech. The Monarchs lost their conference series to Western Kentucky, UTSA, Marshall, FAU, UAB and Charlotte after a Saturday win was vacated for a 27-man roster violation and got swept for the first time in C-USA play at MTSU. Out of conference play the Monarchs swept the weekend series from Penn and the season match ups from VMI and Virginia and won their weekend series from Rutgers. The team also split a home and home season series from Liberty and William & Mary and were swept by ECU and VCU. After finishing with a 13–17 conference record ODU ended up tied for 7th in conference standings with the tie-breaker over FIU to be the 7 seed in the 2015 C-USA Conference Baseball Tournament.

On Tuesday, April 28, 2015, the ODU Monarchs hosted #22 Virginia at Harbor Park for the second straight year and defeating them for the third straight time. The game was played in front of a crowd of 6,029 people which set the record for largest crowd to attend a college baseball game in Virginia state history. The 2014 Harbor Park meeting had set the ODU record for fans to an ODU baseball game in Norfolk and was more than doubled at the 2015 meeting.

The 2015 C-USA Baseball Tournament was hosted by Southern Miss and took place from May 20 through 24, 2015. The top eight teams in the conference make the tournament which is a round-robin, double-elimination format. ODU was the 7 seed and lost to both FAU and Southern Miss to get knocked out of the tournament.

In the 2015 MLB Player Draft three Monarchs were selected; IF PJ Higgins, RHP Greg Tomchick, and 1B Taylor Ostrich. This is the second most players drafted out of Old Dominion with the most being 4 set in 1991, 1992, 2006 and 2008.

=== Roster ===
2015 Old Dominion Monarchs roster
Pitchers: 13 – Nick Hartman – So; 16 – Thomas Busbice – Jr; 20 – Kyle Majette – Jr; 25 – Jared Koenig – Jr; 27 – Greg Tomchick – Sr; 28 – Jake Josephs – (redshirt) So; 31 – Nate Matheson – Fr; 32 – Vic Díaz – (redshirt) Sr; 33 – Turner Bishop – So; 34 – Sam Sinnen – So; 39 – Michael Rienerth – (redshirt) Jr; 40 – Adam Bainbridge – So; 41 – Addison Barber – (redshirt) Fr; 42 – Joey Benitez – So	Catchers: 14 – Kurt Sinnen – So; 26 – Chris Livers – Jr; 29 – Michael Perez – Sr; Infielders: 2 – Jason McMurray – Jr; 6 – Greyson Finwood – (redshirt) Fr; 7 – PJ Higgins – Jr; 11 – Derek Francis – Jr; 15 – Zach Rutherford – Fr; 17 – Taylor Ostrich – Sr; 22 – Nick Lustrino – Jr	Outfielders: 1 – Justin Hayes – Fr; 4 – Nick Walker – So; 8 – Joseph Guaragna – So; 9 – Connor Myers – Jr; 10 – Matt Cogen – Fr; 24 – Josh Eldridge – Sr; 38 – Dylan Hill – Jr

=== Coaches ===
2015 Old Dominion Monarchs baseball coaching staff
- 5 – Chris Finwood – Head coach – 4th Season
- 12 – Karl Nonemaker – Assistant coach – 4th Season
- 21 – Paul Bottigliero – Volunteer coach – 4th Season
- 44 – Tim LaVigne – Pitching coach – 5th Season

=== Awards ===
- Conference Hitter of the Week

Mar 16 – Josh Eldridge OF; 15 H, 4 2B, 1 HR, 3 RBI, 9 R
Apr 13 – PJ Higgins INF; .481 BA, 13 H, 3 2B, 2 HR

- Conference Pitcher of the Week

Mar 16 – Greg Tomchick RHP; 6 IP, 1 BB, 1 H, 1 HR, 9 K, perfect game going into the 7th

- All-Conference USA Second Team

SP Sam Sinnen
IF PJ Higgins

- All-Conference USA Freshman Team

IF Zach Rutherford

- Freshman All-Americans

SS Zach Rutherford

=== Drafted players ===
2B PJ Higgins – 12th Round, 353rd overall Chicago Cubs
RHP Greg Tomchick – 27th Round, 821st overall St. Louis Cardinals
1B Taylor Ostrich – 34th Round, 1029th overall Kansas City Royals

=== Game log ===
2015 Old Dominion Monarchs baseball game log
Regular season

February
Date	Opponent	Site/stadium	Score	Pitcher of Record	Attendance	Overall record	C-USA record
Feb 13	Coastal Carolina	Springs Brooks Stadium	0–4	Tomchick (0–1)	1736	0–1	0-0
Feb 14	#18 Maryland	Springs Brooks Stadium	2–5	Josephs (0–1)	367	0–2	0-0
Feb 15	Canisius	Springs Brooks Stadium	6–8	Diaz (0–1)	143	0–3	0-0
Feb 27	Rutgers	Cal Ripken Complex – Myrtle Beach, South Carolina	3–0	Tomchick (1–1)	36	1–3	0-0
Feb 28	Rutgers	Cal Ripken Complex	3–2	Diaz(1–1)	64	2–3	0-0

March
Date	Opponent	Site/stadium	Score	Pitcher of Record	Attendance	Overall record	C-USA record
Mar 1	Rutgers	Cal Ripken Complex	9–13	Hartman(0–1)	74	2–4	0-0
Mar 4	East Carolina	Clark-LeClair Stadium	7–9	Bainbridge(0–1)	2155	2–5	0-0
Mar 8	Penn	Bud Metheny Baseball Complex	5–1	Busbice (1–0)	516	3–5	0-0
Mar 8	Penn	Bud Metheny Baseball Complex	5–3	Diaz (2–1)	516	4–5	0-0
Mar 9	Penn	Bud Metheny Baseball Complex	9–8	Sinnen, S (1–0)	306	5–5	0-0
Mar 10	Bryant	Bud Metheny Baseball Complex	9–8	Busbice (2–0)	308	6–5	0-0
Mar 11	#1 Virginia	Davenport Field	14–5	Diaz (3–1)	2778	7–5	0-0
Mar 14(1)	WKU	Nick Denes Field	3–1	Tomchick (2–1)	483	8–5	1-0
Mar 14(2)	WKU	Nick Denes Field	3–6	Benitez (0–1)	483	8–6	1-1
Mar 15	WKU	Nick Denes Field	5–9	Sinnen, S (1–1)	408	8–7	1-2
Mar 17	VMI	Bud Metheny Baseball Complex	8–5	Rienerth (1–0)	922	9–7	1-2
Mar 18	VMI	Bud Metheny Baseball Complex	7–6	Rutherford (1–0)	505	10–7	1-2
Mar 20	#8 Rice	Bud Metheny Baseball Complex	12–4	Tomchick (3–1)	491	11–7	2-2
Mar 21	#8 Rice	Bud Metheny Baseball Complex	9–8	Busbice (3–0)	921	12–7	3-2
Mar 22	#8 Rice	Bud Metheny Baseball Complex	4–5	Sinnen, S (1–2)	568	12–8	3-3
Mar 25	VMI	Gray–Minor Stadium	11–3	Matheson (1–0)	95	13–8	3-3
Mar 27	Middle Tennessee	Reese Smith Jr. Field	2–7	Tomchick (3–2)	138	13–9	3-4
Mar 28	Middle Tennessee	Reese Smith Jr. Field	2–8	Hartman (0–2)	156	13–10	3-5
Mar 29	Middle Tennessee	Reese Smith Jr. Field	4–5	Busbice (3–1)	248	13–11	3-6
Mar 31	Liberty	Liberty Baseball Stadium	7–9	Matheson (1–1)	1116	13–12	3-6

April
Date	Opponent	Site/stadium	Score	Pitcher of Record	Attendance	Overall record	C-USA record
Apr 1	William & Mary	Bud Metheny Baseball Complex	4–0	S Sinnen (2–2)	552	14–12	3-6
Apr 3	Charlotte	Bud Metheny Baseball Complex	7–9	Tomchick (3–3)	727	14–13	3-7
**Apr 4	Charlotte	Bud Metheny Baseball Complex	Forfeit	None	734	14–14	3–8
Apr 5	Charlotte	Bud Metheny Baseball Complex	15–1 F/7	Bainbridge (1–1)	622	15–14	4–8
Apr 6	Liberty	Bud Metheny Baseball Complex	5–1	S Sinnen (3–2)	654	16–14	4-8
Apr 8	VCU	Bud Metheny Baseball Complex	10–2	Matheson (1=2)	591	16–15	4–8
Apr 10(1)	UTSA	Roadrunner Field	6–7 F/13	Rutherford (1–1)	120	16–16	4-9
Apr 10(2)	UTSA	Roadrunner Field	2–8	Hartman (0–3)	120	16–17	4-10
Apr 11	UTSA	Roadrunner Field	11–2	Bainbridge (2–1)	100	17–17	5-10
Apr 14	William & Mary	Plumeri Park	9–11	Rutherford (1–2)	125	17–18	5-10
Apr 15	East Carolina	Bud Metheny Baseball Complex	2–4	Matheson (1–3)	445	17–19	5-10
Apr 17	Marshall	Bud Metheny Baseball Complex	1–6	Tomchick (3–4)	1108	17–20	5-11
Apr 18	Marshall	Bud Metheny Baseball Complex	1–5	Hartman (0–4)	839	17–21	5-12
Apr 19	Marshall	Bud Metheny Baseball Complex	6–2	Bainbridge (3–1)	650	18–21	6-12
Apr 22	Richmond	Bud Metheny Baseball Complex	11–5	Josephs (1–1)	582	19–21	6-12
Apr 24	#14 Florida Atlantic	FAU Baseball Stadium	15–3	S Sinnen (4–2)	322	20–21	7-12
Apr 25	#14 Florida Atlantic	FAU Baseball Stadium	1–8	Hartman (0–5)		20–22	7-13
Apr 26	#14 Florida Atlantic	FAU Baseball Stadium	2–8	Bainbridge (3–2)	283	20–23	7-14
Apr 28	#23 Virginia	Harbor Park	3–1	Benitez (1–1)	6029	21–23	7-14

May
Date	Opponent	Site/stadium	Score	Pitcher of Record	Attendance	Overall record	C-USA record
May 2(1)	FIU	Bud Metheny Baseball Complex	4–2	Sinnen (5–2)	662	22–23	8-14
May 2(2)	FIU	Bud Metheny Baseball Complex	1–4	Benitez (1–2)	662	22–24	8-15
May 3	FIU	Bud Metheny Baseball Complex	3–0	Josephs (2–1)	559	23–24	9-15
May 8	Louisiana Tech	Bud Metheny Baseball Complex	7–0	Sinnen (6–2)	637	24–24	10-15
May 9	Louisiana Tech	Bud Metheny Baseball Complex	4–2	Josephs (3–1)	884	25–24	11-15
May 10	Louisiana Tech	Bud Metheny Baseball Complex	6–5	Bainbridge (4–2)	513	26–24	12-15
May 12	VCU	War Memorial Stadium (Hampton)	3–9	Tomchick (3–5)	642	26–25	12-15
May 14	UAB	Jerry D. Young Memorial Field	4–7	Busbice (3–2)	632	26–26	12-16
May 15	UAB	Jerry D. Young Memorial Field	6–3	Tomchick (3–6)	361	26–27	12-17
May 16	UAB	Jerry D. Young Memorial Field	11–0 F/7	Matheson (2–3)	548	27–27	13-17

Postseason

Conference USA Tournament
Date	Opponent	Site/stadium	Score	Pitcher of Record	Attendance	Overall record	Tournament record
May 20	FAU	Pete Taylor Park	4–6	Sinnen (6–3)		27–28	0-1
May 21	Southern Miss	Pete Taylor Park	0–2	Hartman (0–6)	1616	27–29	0–2

April 4 game against Charlotte was forfeited due to a 27-man active roster violation. ODU had won the game 7–2 under protest.
