= 2009 Old Dominion Monarchs baseball team =

American college baseball season

2009 Old Dominion Monarchs baseball
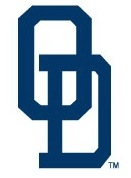
- Conference: Colonial Athletic Association
- Record: 22–27 (13–11 CAA)
- Head coach: Jerry Meyers (5th season)
- Assistant coaches: Ryan Morris (5th season); Nate Goulet (4th season); Travis Huffman (2nd season)
- Home stadium: Bud Metheny Baseball Complex

2009 Colonial Athletic Association baseball standings
	Conf.				Overall
Team	W		L	PCT	W		L	PCT
George Mason ‍†‍‍^{y}	19	–	5	.792	42	–	14	.750
Georgia State ‍‍‡‍^{y}	12	–	9	.571	39	–	22	.639
UNC Wilmington ‍‍‍	10	–	8	.556	31	–	23	.574
Northeastern ‍‍‍	13	–	11	.542	28	–	25	.528
Old Dominion ‍‍‍	13	–	11	.542	22	–	27	.449
Delaware ‍‍‍	11	–	10	.524	28	–	20	.583
James Madison ‍‍‍	12	–	11	.522	30	–	24	.556
Towson ‍‍‍	12	–	12	.500	28	–	25	.528
William & Mary ‍‍‍	9	–	14	.391	24	–	25	.490
VCU ‍‍‍	8	–	16	.333	20	–	26	.435
Hofstra ‍‍‍	6	–	18	.250	11	–	32	.256
‡ – Tournament champion y – Invited to the NCAA tournament As of June 30, 2009; Rankings from Collegiate Baseball

The 2009 Old Dominion Monarchs baseball team represented Old Dominion University in the 2009 NCAA Division I baseball season. The Monarchs played their home games at Bud Metheny Baseball Complex, which was named for former coach Bud Metheny.

The 2009 Monarchs compiled a losing record for the second year in a row but were still able to earn a berth to the CAA tournament with a 13–11 conference mark. The team played against three ranked teams during the season; #17 South Carolina, #20 ECU, and #29 George Mason losing each time.

The season started at the Wake Forest tournament where they went 2–2 with wins against Marshall and Akron. In conference play ODU won their series against James Madison, Hofstra, William & Mary, and sweeping rival VCU.

Third baseman Jake McAloose led the team in batting average hitting .413 which is the 9th highest single-season batting average in ODU history. His remarkable offensive season and fielding .965 earned him 1st team All-CAA and 2nd team ABCA All-Region. Freshman OF/RHP Brett Harris earned Freshman All-American honors as well.

== Drafted players ==
Joe Velleggia - Baltimore Orioles
