= Old Dominion Monarchs baseball =

Old Dominion Monarchs
- 2026 Old Dominion Monarchs baseball team
- Founded: 1931
- Overall record: 1437–1054–4 (.577)
- University: Old Dominion University
- Head coach: Chris Finwood (15th season)
- Conference: Sun Belt
- Location: Norfolk, Virginia
- Home stadium: Bud Metheny Ballpark (capacity: 2,500)
- Nickname: Monarchs
- Colors: Slate blue, silver, and light blue

NCAA tournament appearances
- Division II: 1971 • 1972; Division I: 1982 • 1985 • 1990 • 1994; 1995 • 1996 • 2000 • 2014 • 2021

Conference tournament champions
- Sun Belt: 1985; Colonial Athletic: 1994 • 1995 • 1996; Conference USA: 2021

Conference regular season champions
- Sun Belt: 1985; Colonial Athletic: 1994 • 1995 • 1996 • 2000

The Old Dominion Monarchs baseball team is a varsity intercollegiate athletic team of Old Dominion University in Norfolk, Virginia, United States. The team is a member of the Sun Belt Conference, which is part of NCAA Division I. Old Dominion's first baseball team was fielded in 1931 as the William and Mary College – Norfolk Division Braves. ODU joined Division I in 1977. The team plays its home games at Bud Metheny Ballpark in Norfolk, Virginia, where it has played since 1983. ODU has won six conference tournament titles and have been to the NCAA tournament nine times. The Monarchs are coached by Chris Finwood, a native of Hampton, Virginia, who is in his eleventh year at the helm. The Monarchs have had eleven players reach the Major Leagues and two, Justin Verlander and Daniel Hudson, have played in the World Series.

== History ==
=== Division II: pre-Metheny era ===
Old Dominion University was founded in 1930 as the College of William and Mary Norfolk Division. The then named Braves played their first season of baseball in 1931 under head coach Tommy Scott. Scott coached the Braves for nine seasons before retiring in 1939 after compiling an overall record of 50-62-2. After Scott the Braves were coached by several coaches who mostly only coached for one season, the most successful of which coached for three seasons and won a total of 5 games.

=== Bud Metheny era ===
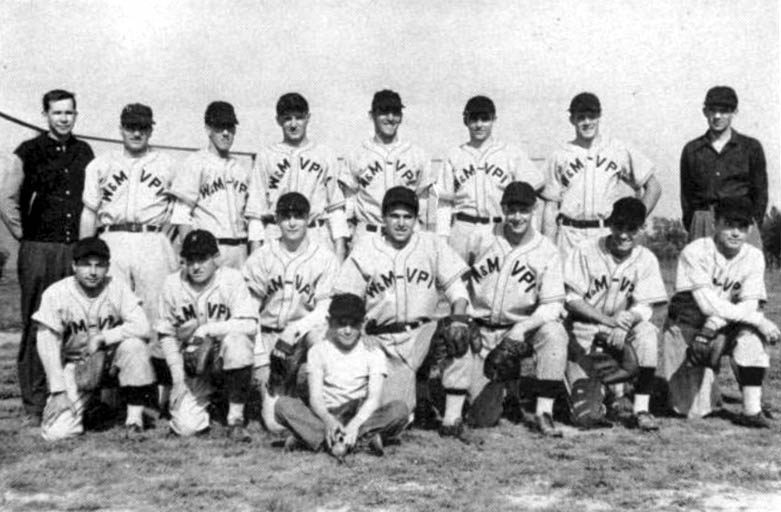
Old Dominion baseball team of 1947

In 1948 former New York Yankee outfielder Arthur "Bud" Metheny became the head coach of the Braves. In 1962 the school became Old Dominion College before attaining university status in 1969 when they changed the name to the Monarchs. Their first post season appearance and title came in 1963 in the Mason Dixon conference playoffs where they defeated Loyola two games to one. While playing in the NCAA's Division II Old Dominion won 6 titles; two Tidewater Scholastic championships in 1932 & 1934, four Little Eight championships in 1958 & 1961-63, and four Mason-Dixon Conference championships in 1963, 1964, 1965, and 1968. In 1963 & 1964 the Monarchs won the NCAA College Division Eastern Championship before losing in the championship in 1965. During the 1969–1970 season the Monarchs were coached by Jim Bradly and went on to a 12-14 record, after which Metheny returned to the team for the next 10 years. In 1971 & 1972 ODU finished as NCAA Division II South Atlantic finalists. He also led the transition for the Baseball Monarchs to NCAA Division I in 1977. Metheny left coaching the Monarchs in 1980 after winning his last title, the Virginia Intercollegiate State Championship over UVA. Metheny is ODU's all-time career wins leader with 423 wins in 31 years.

=== Mark Newman era ===
Mark Newman took over after Metheny in 1981 when the team left the Mason Dixon Conference for the ECAC South, which would later become the Colonial Athletic Association in 1985. In Newman's second season the Monarchs earned a bid to the 1982 NCAA tournament where they won their first game against the ECAC South champion ECU Pirates. In 1983 the Monarchs left the ECAC for the Sun Belt Conference. During the 1985 season the Monarchs set several school recording including overall wins with a record of 50-11, the schools only 50 win season, and a Sun Belt Championship. The 1985 Monarchs earned a berth in the 1985 NCAA tournament and during the season achieved their highest ranking in school history, appearing at 7th in the polls. Newman coached the Monarchs from 1981–1989 when he left to become New York Yankees coordinator of minor league instruction.

=== The CAA years ===
In 1990 the Monarchs were taken over by Pat McMahon who in his first year led the team to the 1990 NCAA tournament. The Monarchs then transitioned to the Colonial Athletic Association in 1992. McMahon again led the Monarchs to the NCAA tournament in 1994 after winning the CAA tournament. Both times McMahon led the Monarchs to the NCAA tournament he had 40 win seasons. McMahon left ODU after the 1994 season to become the associate head coach at Mississippi State. Tony Guzzo was hired from VCU in 1995 after McMahon left ODU and led the Monarchs to back-to-back CAA titles and NCAA tournaments in his first two seasons at the helm. Between Coach McMahon and Coach Guzzo the Monarchs had the 21st best winning percentage (.660) in the NCAA during the 1990s tied with Texas and ahead of teams like USC and Mississippi State. In 2000 Guzzo again led his team to the post season earning an at-large bid to the 2000 NCAA tournament. Guzzo coached the Monarchs until 2005 when Jerry Meyers took over. Meyers coached the Monarchs from 2005–2010 when he returned to South Carolina. Meyers' career at ODU was highlighted by a victory over #2 UNC, the school's lone victory over a top 5 team until 2014. The 2011 ODU Monarchs were coached by interim head coach Nate Goulet who was named CAA Coach of the Year and led the team to an appearance in the CAA Championship game.

=== Chris Finwood era ===
In 2012 Old Dominion hired Chris Finwood as their head coach. Finwood came to ODU from Western Kentucky where he led the Hilltoppers to two conference titles and NCAA tournament appearances. His first season resulted in 19 wins and last place in the CAA. Finwood led the Monarchs from the CAA to Conference USA in 2014 and made them instantly competitive in their new league. The 2013 team was ineligible for the CAA tournament because of this planned move and went on to win 30 games and finished in 3rd place in the conference. Finwood's third team at ODU continued to improve on the previous year by winning six more games than the 2013 team. On April 29, 2014 the Monarchs defeated the #1 ranked team and eventual College World Series runner-up Virginia by a score of 8-1 at Harbor Park in Norfolk, Virginia. The victory was ODU and Finwood's first ever victory over the #1 team in the country. The season concluded after a deep run in the conference tournament earned them a bid to the 2014 NCAA tournament where they went 0-2. In just three years Finwood led the Monarchs from last place in the CAA to back-to-back 30-win seasons, and earned an at-large bid to the NCAA tournament as a three seed in the Columbia, South Carolina Regional. In 6 seasons he has won 30+ games at the helm of ODU's program.

In 2015 ODU swept nationally ranked UVA making it three straight over the Cavaliers, two of those wins when UVA was ranked #1. Finwood has currently led his team to 27+ wins in three of his four seasons at ODU after a 19 win campaign in his first season and two straight C-USA Conference Tournament berths. Despite a 30 win season and 15-12 in conference, ODU was ineligible for 2013 CAA Conference Tournament but would have been the third seed.

== Coaching records ==
- Records are through the end of the 2023 season
- Records taken from the Old Dominion baseball media guide.
- No team played baseball for ODU during the 1939–1940 and 1944–1945 seasons.

Pre-Division I

Tenure	Coach	Seasons	W	L	T	Winning %
1930–39	Tommy Scott	9	50	62	2	.447
1940–42	George Gregory	1	0	11	0	.000
1942–46	Scrap Chandler	3	5	18	0	.217
1946–47	Everett Tolson	1	2	8	1	.227
1947–48	Jack Callahan	1	1	4	0	.200
1969–70	Jim Brady	1	12	14	0	.462
1948–69, 70–77	Bud Metheny	27	353	274	6	.562
Totals	7 coaches	43	423	391	9	.519

Division I

Tenure	Coach	Seasons	W	L	T	Winning %
1977–80	Bud Metheny	4	70	89	0	.440
1980–89	Mark Newman	9	321	167	3	.657
1989–94	Pat McMahon	5	189	86	0	.687
1994–2004	Tony Guzzo	10	303	252	1	.546
2004–10	Jerry Meyers	6	167	158	0	.514
2010–11	Nate Goulet	1	30	26	0	.536
2011–present	Chris Finwood	13	360	276	0	.566
Totals	7 coaches	48	1440	1054	4	.577

== Year by year results ==
- Since joining Division I – 1977

Super Regionals	Conference Championship	NCAA At-Large Bid

Season	Coach	Conference	W	L	T	CW	CL	Postseason
1977	Bud Metheny		14	20	0			
1978	Bud Metheny		20	17	0			
1979	Bud Metheny		16	30	0			
1980	Bud Metheny		20	22	0			State Champions
1981	Mark Newman	ECAC South	34	20	0			
1982	Mark Newman	ECAC South	38	14	2			East Regional
1983	Mark Newman	Sun Belt	41	11	0	12	3	
1984	Mark Newman	Sun Belt	31	20	0	10	7	
1985	Mark Newman	Sun Belt	50	11	0	14	4	Sun Belt Champions, East Regional
1986	Mark Newman	Sun Belt	43	16	0	11	7	
1987	Mark Newman	Sun Belt	34	18	0	11	5	
1988	Mark Newman	Sun Belt	24	31	1	5	13	
1989	Mark Newman	Sun Belt	26	26	0	5	10	
1990	Pat McMahon	Sun Belt	40	19	0	11	6	NCAA Central Regional
1991	Pat McMahon	Sun Belt	39	23	0	10	8	
1992	Pat McMahon	CAA	39	19	0	11	7	
1993	Pat McMahon	CAA	31	11	0	9	3	
1994	Pat McMahon	CAA	40	14	0	14	4	CAA tournament champions, East Regional
1995	Tony Guzzo	CAA	39	20	0	9	9	CAA tournament champions, Atlantic I Regional
1996	Tony Guzzo	CAA	39	17	0	13	7	CAA tournament champions, Atlantic Regional
1997	Tony Guzzo	CAA	34	20	0	12	8	
1998	Tony Guzzo	CAA	28	29	0	9	12	
1999	Tony Guzzo	CAA	38	17	0	7	11	
2000	Tony Guzzo	CAA	33	24	1	14	7	CAA regular season champions, Clemson Regional
2001	Tony Guzzo	CAA	19	37	0	6	15	
2002	Tony Guzzo	CAA	26	27	0	8	12	
2003	Tony Guzzo	CAA	16	33	0	5	15	
2004	Tony Guzzo	CAA	26	28	0	13	11	
2005	Jerry Meyers	CAA	22	33	0	5	19	
2006	Jerry Meyers	CAA	39	17	0	21	9	
2007	Jerry Meyers	CAA	35	24	0	18	11	
2008	Jerry Meyers	CAA	25	27	0	14	14	
2009	Jerry Meyers	CAA	22	27	0	13	11	
2010	Jerry Meyers	CAA	24	30	0	11	13	
2011	Nate Goulet	CAA	30	26	0	19	11	
2012	Chris Finwood	CAA	19	34	0	9	21	
2013	Chris Finwood	CAA	30	24	0	15	12	
2014	Chris Finwood	C-USA	36	26	0	17	13	Columbia, South Carolina Regional
2015	Chris Finwood	C-USA	27	29	0	13	17	
2016	Chris Finwood	C-USA	32	24	0	15	15	
2017	Chris Finwood	C-USA	37	21	0	19	11	
2018	Chris Finwood	C-USA	15	37	0	7	22	
2019	Chris Finwood	C-USA	35	21	0	16	14	
2020	Chris Finwood	C-USA	12	4	0	0	0	Season cancelled due to the COVID-19 pandemic
2021	Chris Finwood	C-USA	44	16	0	22	10	Columbia, South Carolina Regional
2022	Chris Finwood	C-USA	41	17	0	19	11	
2023	Chris Finwood	Sun Belt	32	23	0	15	15	
Total:			1437	1054	4	268	435	NCAA Regional
Win Percentage:			.577			.381		Appearances: 9

Note: W = Wins, L = Losses, T = Ties, CW = Conference Wins, CL = Conference Losses

== Monarchs in the NCAA tournament ==
Season	Regional & Seed	Record	Results
1982	East (2)	1–2 (.333)	Eliminated by The Citadel in Regional
1985	East	0–2 (.000)	Eliminated by Rider in Regional
1990	Central (4)	0–2 (.000)	Eliminated by Texas in Regional
1994	East (3)	1–2 (.333)	Eliminated by Clemson in Regional
1995	Atlantic I (5)	2–2 (.500)	Eliminated by Ole Miss in Regional semifinal
1996	Atlantic I (4)	0–2 (.000)	Eliminated by Clemson in Regional
2000	Clemson (2)	0–2 (.000)	Eliminated by Middle Tennessee in Regional
2014	Columbia, SC (3)	0–2 (.000)	Eliminated by Campbell in Regional
2021	Columbia, SC (1)	2–2 (.400)	Eliminated by Virginia in Regional Final
Tournament Record: 6-18 (.250)			Total NCAA tournament Appearances: 9

NCAA tournament Game-by-Game Results

1982
East Regional

Defeated East Carolina 2–1
Lost to West Virginia 6–7
Lost to The Citadel 1–15

1985
East Regional

Lost to Western Carolina 3–5
Lost to Rider 2–3

1990
Central Regional

Lost to Cal State Fullerton 3–16
Lost to Texas 0–10

1994
East Regional

Defeated Notre Dame 9–5
Lost to Auburn 8–11 (10)
Lost to Clemson 1–6

1995
Atlantic I Regional

Defeated Ole Miss 5–3
Defeated UCF 7–6
Lost to Florida State 2–7
Lost to Ole Miss 4–5

1996
Atlantic I Regional

Lost to Georgia Southern 0–6
Lost to Clemson 1–15

2000
Clemson Regional

Lost to Illinois 1–3
Lost to Middle Tennessee 5–6

2014
Columbia Regional

Lost to Maryland 3–4
Lost to Campbell 1–4 (12)

2021
Columbia Regional

Defeated Jacksonville 4–3
Defeated South Carolina 2–1
Lost to Virginia 3–8
Lost to Virginia 3–4 (10)

NCAA All Tournament Team

- 1994 East Regional

Kevin Gibbs OF

- 1995 Atlantic I Regional

Ray Russin DH
Maika Symmonds OF

- 2000 Clemson Regional

Tim Hummel SS

- 2014 Columbia Regional

Tyler Urps SS

== Rivalries ==
Records through of 2015 season

East Carolina University
ODU and ECU were longtime opponents in the CAA before ECU's move to the C-USA. When ODU announced it was moving to the C-USA in 2014 it was expected to add to the already heated rivalry but they were only together in the C-USA for one year due to ECU's move to the American Athletic Conference. ECU and ODU are yearly opponents regardless of conference affiliation and ECU leads the all-time series 44-34.

University of Virginia
ODU and UVA have played very competitively over the course of their history. With the hiring of head coach Brian O'Connor and the resurgence of Cavalier baseball during his tenure the Cavaliers have won most of the games in the past decade. UVA and ODU have scheduled home-and-home series at Davenport Field in Charlottesville and Harbor Park in Norfolk. ODU upset then #1 UVA at Harbor Park in 2014 and #1 UVA in Charlottesville in 2015 for the programs only wins over a top ranked team in school history. ODU leads the all-time series 33-24-2 and is currently on a three-game winning streak.

Virginia Commonwealth University
VCU was one of Old Dominion's largest rivalries from its time in the CAA. ODU & VCU games are among the highest attended games on their schedule and they play at least one game against each other every season. Former Monarch Paul Keyes was the head coach at VCU from 1995 until his death in 2012. In honor of Coach Keyes the two teams began a charity game in his name where they raise money for cancer research during a game played at War Memorial Stadium in Hampton, Virginia. The Paul A Keyes Hitting Facility at the Bud Metheny Baseball Complex which opened in Fall 2014 was also named in Coach Keyes' honor. ODU leads the all-time series 87-61.

=== All-Time Record vs Sun Belt ===
- Records include games prior to ODU rejoining Sun Belt in 2023.
- Records are current until the end of 2023 season.
- The Monarchs have yet to play conference foes Louisiana, Louisiana–Monroe, South Alabama, and Troy

Opponent	Won	Lost	Tie	Percentage
Appalachian State	5	2	0	.714
Arkansas State	2	1	0	.667
Coastal Carolina	3	5	0	.375
Georgia Southern	2	2	0	.500
Georgia State	12	15	0	.444
James Madison	35	23	0	.603
Marshall	22	9	0	.710
Southern Miss	3	11	0	.214
Texas State	1	2	0	.333
Record: 85-70 .548

=== ODU vs Top 10 Teams ===
Old Dominion is 7-5 all-time in match-ups against Top 10 ranked teams.

- #1

2014 at Virginia – L 1-7
2014 Virginia – W 8-1(at Harbor Park)
2015 at Virginia – W 14-5

- #2

2008 at North Carolina – W 8-6

- #5

2009 at North Carolina – L 6-7
2023 at Virginia – L 1-8

- #7

2022 at Southern Miss – W/W/L 4-1, 4-3, 4-5 (10 inns)

- #8

1998 South Carolina – W 15-10
2003 NC State – L 1-3
2015 Rice – W/W/L 12-4, 9-8, 4-5
2022 at Virginia – W 9-2

- #10

2001 South Carolina – L 3-16
2023 at East Carolina – L 3-7

== Award winners ==
=== Conference awards ===
- All awards come from the ODU sports baseball record book.
- Awards are first team unless otherwise noted.
- The Monarchs have had 152 All-Conference Selections, 133 since joining Division I. By conference there have been 19 All Mason Dixon(D-II), 6 All-ECAC South, 41 All-Sun Belt, 72 All-CAA, and 14 All-Conference USA selections.
- The ODU record for most All-Conference selections is 8 in 1985, ODU's only 50 win season and Sun Belt Tournament championship season.

All Mason Dixon Selections

Year	Player	Position	Notes
1963	Wayne Parks	3B	
	James Zadell	OF	
	Frank Zadell	OF	
	Fred Edmonds	P	
	Robert Walton	P	
1964	Wayne Parks	3B	
	Fred Kovner	OF	
	Robert Walton	P	
	Fred Balmer	P	2nd Team
	Fred Edmonds	P	Hon. Mention
1965	Fred Kovner	OF	
	James Zadell	OF	
	Fred Edmonds	P	
1967	Tony Zontini	3B	
	Jimmy Jones	OF	
	Button Speakes		Hon. Mention
1968	Tony Zontini	3B	
	Bobby Williams	P	
	Billy Turner		Hon. Mention

All ECAC South Selections

Year	Player	Position	Notes
1981	Mark Wasinger	2B	
	John Mitcheltree	P	
1982	Mark Wasinger	2B	
	Jeff Beard	1B	
	Tony Morris	OF	
	Jim Ambrose	1B	

All CAA Selections

Year	Player	Position	Notes
1992	T. J. O’Donnell	SS	
1993	Geoff Edsell	1B/P	
	Kevin Gibbs	RF	
	John Smith	P	
	Wayne Gomes	P	
	Ryan Beard	3B	2nd team
	Mike Cowell	C	2nd team
	Mark Baron	OF	2nd team
1994	Kevin Gibbs	RF	
	John Smith	P	
	Matt Quatraro	1B	2nd team
	Dan Almonte	SS	2nd team
	Jude Donato	2B	2nd team
	Denis McLaughlin	P	2nd team
1995	Kevin Gibbs	OF	
	Maika Symmonds	OF	
	Matt Quatraro	C	
	Rob Morgan	1B	2nd team
1996	Matt Quatraro	C	
	Brian Fiumara	OF	
	Ron Walker	3B/P	
	John O'Reilly	P	2nd team
1997	Ron Walker	3B	
	Ron Walker	P	2nd team
	Jesse James	P	
	Brian Brantley	P	2nd team
	Tony Gsell	SS	2nd team
1998	Shawn Pearson	OF	
	Tony Gsell	2B	2nd team
	Tim Hummel	SS	2nd team
1999	Tim Hummel	SS	
	Tony Gsell	2B	2nd team
	Andy Lee	P	
2000	Tim Hummell	SS	
	Jared Musolf	1B	
2001	Matt Moye	OF	2nd team
2003	Justin Verlander	P	
2004	Justin Verlander	P	
	Donnie Smith	P	2nd team
	Steven Harris	OF	2nd team
2006	Dana Arrowood	OF	
	Mike Zahm	OF	2nd team
	Jimmy Miles	OF	2nd team
	Pat Nichols	C	2nd team
	Jason Godin	P	2nd team
2007	Anthony Shawler	P	
	Dan Hudson	P	
	Mike Zahm	OF	2nd team
	Jake McAloose	3B	All Freshman
2008	Jimmy Miles	OF	2nd team
	David Burns	DH	2nd team
	Dan Hudson	P	2nd team
	Anthony Shawler	OF	3rd team
2009	Jake McAloose	3B	
	Gerard Hall	SS	2nd team
	Max Most	OF	3rd team
	Brett Harris	P	All Freshman
	Ben Tomchick	P	All Freshman
	Josh Wright	1B	All Freshman
2010	Kyle Hald	P	
2011	Kyle Hald	P	
	Josh Wright	SS	
	Adam Wisniewski	P	
	Joey Burney	IF	All Freshman
	Dean Ali	P	All Freshman
2012	Josh Tutwiler	C	3rd team
	Josh Wright	SS	3rd team
	Josh Eldridge	OF	All Freshman
2013	Ben Verlander	OF	
	Connor Myers	OF	All Freshman
	PJ Higgins	2B	All Freshman
	Tommy Alexander	P	All Freshman

All Conference USA Selections

Year	Player	Position	Notes
2014	Nick Walker	OF	
	Nick Walker	OF	All Freshman
	Joey Burney	1B	2nd team
2015	PJ Higgins	IF	2nd team
	Sam Sinnen	SP	2nd team
	Zach Rutherford	IF	All Freshman
2016	Connor Myers	CF	2nd team
	Sam Sinnen	RHP	2nd team
2017	Zach Rutherford	IF	
	Jared Young	IF	
	Adam Bainbridge	SP	
	Vinny Pasquantino	1B	All Freshman
	John Wilson	P	All Freshman
	Kyle Battle	OF	All Freshman
2018	Eric Stock	UT	All Freshman
2019	Vinnie Pasquantino	IF	
	Andy Garriola	OF	
	Bryce Windham	IF	2nd team
	Ryne Moore	SP	2nd team
	Hunter Gregory	RP	2nd team
	Andy Garriola	OF	All-Freshman
	Ryan Teschko	OF	All-Freshman
2021	Carter Trice	IF	
	Kyle Battle	OF	
	Hunter Gregory	SP	
	Tommy Bell	IF	2nd team
	Andy Garriola	OF	2nd team
	Ryne Moore	SP	2nd team
	Jason Hartline	RP	2nd team
	Carter Trice	INF	All-Freshman
	Noah Dean	RP	All-Freshman
2022	Brock Gagliardi	C	
	Matt Courtney	INF	
	Andy Garriola	OF	
	Blake Morgan	P	
	Carter Trice	OF	2nd team
	Blake Morgan	P	All-Freshman

All Sun Belt Selections

Year	Player	Position	Notes
1983	Joe Mills	OF	
	Tom Reichel	SS	
	Terry Bell	C	
	Lou Berge	DH	
	Tommy West	P	
1984	Sean O'Hare	1B	
	Tom Reichel	SS	
	Rob Sessoms	OF	
	Nick Booth	C	
1985	Sean O'Hare	1B	
	Wiley Lee	2B	
	Tommy Reichel	SS	
	Nick Booth	OF	
	Rob Sessoms	OF	
	Todd Azar	DH	
	Tommy West	P	
	Kevin Bearse	P	
1986	Wiley Lee	SS	
	Todd Azar	OF	
	Paul McGovern	OF	
	Tommy Reicehll	SS	2nd team
	Jim Hvizda	P	2nd team
1987	Wiley Lee	SS	
	Warren Willey	OF	
	Kevin Bearse	P	
	Jim Hvizda	P	2nd team
	Todd Azar	P	2nd team
1988	Jim Hvizda	P	
1990	Scott Thomson	OF	
	Jeff Ware	P	
	George Sells	DH/P	2nd team
	Barry Miller	1B	2nd team
	Pat Evangelista	SS	2nd team
	James Krevokuch	3B	2nd team
	Scott Hafling	C	2nd team
1991	Scott Thomson	1B	
	Jeff Ware	P	
	Jim Krevokuch	3B	
	T.J. O’Donnell	OF	
	Pat Evangelista	SS	
	Shawn McDonnell	C	2nd team
2023	Hunter Fitz-Gerald	INF	
	Sam Armstrong	P	2nd team

Conference Player of the Year

- Sun Belt

1986 Todd Azar

- CAA

1994 Kevin Gibbs
1997 Ron Walker
2000 Tim Hummel
2011 Kyle Hald

- C-USA

2022 Matt Courtney

Conference Tournament MVP

- Sun Belt

1986 Todd Azar

- CAA

1994 Matt Quatraro
1995 Maika Symmonds
1996 Ron Walker

Conference Freshman of the Year

- Sun Belt

1990 Stephen Lyons
1991 T.J. O’Donnell

- CAA

1994 Brett Wheeler
1995 Ron Walker
1998 Tim Hummel
2002 Justin Verlander
2009 Brett Harris

- C-USA

2019 Andy Garriola
2021 Carter Trice
2022 Blake Morgan

Conference Newcomer of the Year

- C-USA

2017 Jared Young

Conference Defensive Player of the Year

- C-USA

2017 Zach Rutherford

Conference Coach of the Year

- Sun Belt

1985 Mark Newman
1987 Mark Newman
1990 Pat McMahon

- CAA

1994 Pat McMahon
1996 Tony Guzzo
2006 Jerry Meyers
2011 Nate Goulet

=== National honors ===
College Baseball Hall of Fame

Inducted	Name	Position
1984	Arthur "Bud" Metheny	Coach (48-69,70-80)

Old Dominion has had six players selected as D-I First Team All-Americans and two selected as D-II First Team All-Americans with one selected twice. Twelve Monarchs have been named First Team Freshman All-Americans. Forty-nine Monarch players have been named to the ABCA All-Region Team.

All Americans

1963 Bob Walton – 1st Team Div II
1963 Jim Zadell – 2nd Team Div II
1964 Fred Kovner – 1st Team Div II
1964 Bob Walton – 2nd Team Div II
1965 Fred Kovner – 1st Team Div II
1982 Mark Wasinger – 1st Team C & SN
1983 Terry Bell – 1st Team SN
1985 Kevin Bearse – 3rd Team BA
1985 Todd Azar – 3rd Team C
1986 Todd Azar – 1st Team BA
1990 George Sells – 1st Team CB
1991 Jeff Ware – 3rd Team C
1994 Kevin Gibbs – 3rd Team CB & BA
1995 Kevin Gibbs – 3rd Team CB
1996 Matt Quatraro – 2nd Team C, 3rd Team CB
2000 Tim Hummel – 1st Team CB & BA, 2nd Team BW
2007 Anthony Shawler – 1st Team CB, 2nd Team C, 3rd Team BA
2013 Ben Verlander – 3rd Team BW
2017 Jared Young – 3rd Team CB, 3rd Team C, Honorable Mention PG
2017 Zach Rutherford – 3rd Team C
2021 Kyle Battle – 2nd Team BW, 3rd Team D1, 3rd Team PG, 3rd Team BA
2022 Matt Courtney – CB, 2nd Team D1, 2nd Team C, 2nd Team BW
2022 Andy Garriola – 2nd Team BW, 3rd Team C

Freshman All Americans

1985 Wiley Lee – 1st Team CB
1990 Stephen Lyons – 2nd Team CB
1991 Wayne Gomes – 1st Team CB
1993 Kevin Gibbs – 1st Team CB & BA
1994 Brett Wheeler – 1st Team CB
1995 Ron Walker – Hon Mention CB
1997 Shawn Pearson – Hon Mention CB
1998 Tim Hummel – 1st Team CB & BA
2000 Brent Sollenberger – Hon Mention CB
2001 Matt Moye – Hon Mention CB
2002 Justin Verlander – 1st Team CB & BA
2006 Dan Hudson – Hon Mention CB
2009 Brett Harris – 1st Team CB
2011 Joey Burney – 1st Team CB
2014 Nick Walker – 1st Team CB
2015 Zach Rutherford – 1st Team CB, 2nd Team BA
2017 Kyle Battle – CB
2017 John Wilson – CB
2017 Vinnie Pasquantino – CB
2019 Andy Garriola – CB, 2nd Team BW, 2nd Team D1
2021 Carter Trice – CB, 1st Team D1, 1st Team PG, 2nd Team BA, 2nd Team BW
2022 Blake Morgan – CB, 1st Team BW, 2nd Team D1
2023 Ben Moore – 2nd Team PG

C – Coaches, CB – Collegiate Baseball/Louisville Slugger, BA – Baseball America, BW – Baseball Writers, SN – Sporting News, PG - Perfect Game/Rawlings, D1 - D1Baseball

ABCA All Region

1981 John Micheltree
1981 Mark Wasinger
1982 Mark Wasinger
1982 Tony Morris
1983 Terry Bell
1985 Todd Azar
1985 Tommy West
1985 Kevin Bearse
1987 Todd Azar
1991 Jeff Ware
1994 Kevin Gibbs
1996 John O’Reilly
1996 Matt Quatraro
1996 Brian Fiumara
1996 Ron Walker
1997 Jesse James
1997 Tony Gsell
1997 Ron Walker
1998 Shawn Pearson
1999 Tony Gsell
1999 Tim Hummel
1999 Andy Lee
2000 Jared Musolf
2000 Tim Hummel
2002 Justin Verlander

2004 Justin Verlander
2006 Jason Godin
2006 Dana Arrowood
2006 Patrick Nichols
2006 Jimmy Miles
2007 Anthony Shawler
2007 Mike Zahm
2007 David Burns
2009 Jake McAloose
2011 Kyle Hald
2013 Ben Verlander
2014 Brad Gero
2017 Jared Young
2017 Zach Rutherford
2019 Andy Garriola
2019 Vinnie Pasquantino
2019 Bryce Windham
2021 Kyle Battle
2021 Andy Garriola
2021 Carter Trice
2021 Tommy Bell
2022 Matt Courtney
2022 Andy Garriola
2022 Blake Morgan

Regional Coach of the Year

1963 Bud Metheny
2014 Chris Finwood

=== MLB Monarch Award winners ===
- MVP

Justin Verlander – 2011 AL

- Cy Young Award

Justin Verlander – 2011 AL

- Rookie of the Year

Justin Verlander – 2006 AL

- Silver Slugger Award

Daniel Hudson – 2011 NL

== Notable players ==
Major Leaguers

- Kevin Bearse (1990)
- Terry Bell (1986–87)
- Wayne Gomes (1997–2002)
- Daniel Hudson (2009–23)
- P. J. Higgins (2021-22)
- Tim Hummel (2003–04)
- Paul Mitchell (1975–80)
- John Montague (1973–80)
- Connor Overton (2021–23)
- Vinnie Pasquantino (2022-present)
- Dennis Riddleberger (1960–72)
- Justin Verlander (2005–present)
- Jeff Ware (1995–96)
- Mark Wasinger (1986–88)
- Ryan Yarbrough (2018–present)
- Jared Young (2022-23)

On Team USA

- Justin Verlander 2003
- Kevin Gibbs 1994
- Jeff Ware 1991
- Wiley Lee 1986
- Todd Azar 1986
- Paul Mitchell 1971

Old Dominion has produced five first round draft picks in the MLB Draft with the highest selection being Justin Verlander at number 2 overall by Detroit in 2004. ODU baseball players have been selected 82 times in the MLB Draft.

Monarchs in the Major League Baseball Draft

Year	Player	Round	Team
1965	Fred Kovner	2	Chicago White Sox
1969	Ron Drews	46	NY Mets
1971	Paul Mitchell	1	Baltimore Orioles
1971	Bruce Sutter	21	Chicago Cubs
1981	John Mitcheltree	6	Baltimore Orioles
1981	Al Sears	24	Atlanta Braves
1982	Mark Wasinger	3	San Diego Padres
1982	Jim Ambrose	22	Houston Astros
1983	Terry Bell	1	Seattle Mariners
1983	Joey Mills	16	Detroit Tigers
1984	Alan Hixon	9	Baltimore Orioles
1984	Scott Hughes	17	Cincinnati Reds
1984	Keith Coe	18	LA Angels
1985	Tommy West	18	Texas Rangers
1986	Sean O'Hare	17	Cincinnati Reds
1986	Todd Azar	30	Milwaukee Brewers
1987	Wiley Lee	5	LA Angels
1987	Rodney Imes	16	NY Yankees
1987	Kevin Bearse	22	Cleveland Indians
1988	Jim Hvizda	19	Texas Rangers
1990	George Sells	6	St. Louis Cardinals
1991	Jeff Ware	1	Toronto Blue Jays
1991	Bill Pulsipher	2	NY Mets
1991	Mike Grohs	6	San Diego Padres
1991	Jim Krevokuch	37	Pittsburgh Pirates
1992	Stephen Lyons	4	NY Mets
1992	Jim Tyrell	14	Boston Red Sox
1992	TJ O'Donnell	38	Boston Red Sox
1992	Riegal Hunt	44	Pittsburgh Pirates
1993	Wayne Gomes	1	Philadelphia Philles
1993	Geoff Edsell	6	LA Angels
1994	Denis McLaughlin	7	Boston Red Sox
1994	John Smith	20	Oakland Athletics
1995	Kevin Gibbs	6	LA Dodgers
1995	Maika Symmonds	19	Pittsburgh Pirates
1996	Matt Quatraro	8	Tampa Bay Rays
1997	Ron Walker	8	Chicago Cubs
1998	Brian Brantly	12	Colorado Rockies
1998	Ian Rauls	12	Philadelphia Phillies
1999	Jim Detwiler	16	Toronto Blue Jays
1999	Tony Gsell	16	Chicago Cubs
1999	Anthony Forelli	26	Milwaukee Brewers
2000	Tim Hummel	2	Chicago White Sox
2000	Brian Ross	15	Cincinnati Reds
2001	Jeff Eure	18	Milwaukee Brewers
2002	Ryan Williams	10	LA Dodgers
2004	Justin Verlander	1	Detroit Tigers
2004	Donnie Smith	4	St. Louis Cardinals
2004	Brandon Carter	40	LA Dodgers
2005	James Burok	8	Cincinnati Reds
2005	Needham Jones	36	Chicago Cubs
2005	Jesse Schoendienst	40	St. Louis Cardinals
2006	Jason Godin	5	Kansas City Royals
2006	Kevin Gunter	13	Cincinnati Reds
2006	Patrick Nicholas	16	Washington Nationals
2006	Dana Arrowood	39	Detroit Tigers
2008	Dan Hudson	5	Chicago White Sox
2008	Anthony Shawler	9	Detroit Tigers
2008	Dexter Carter	13	Chicago White Sox
2008	Ryan Bergh	26	Philadelphia Philles
2009	Jonathan Rodrieguez	17	St. Louis Cardinals
2010	Joe Velleggia	40	Baltimore Orioles
2011	Kyle Hald	18	St. Louis Cardinals
2013	Ben Verlander	14	Detroit Tigers
2013	Ryan Yarbrough	20	Milwaukee Brewers
2014	Ryan Yarbrough	4	Seattle Mariners
2014	Connor Overton	15	Miami Marlins
2015	P. J. Higgins	12	Chicago Cubs
2015	Greg Tomchick	27	St. Louis Cardinals
2015	Taylor Ostrich	34	Kansas City Royals
2016	Nick Hartman	9	Toronto Blue Jays
2016	Connor Myers	27	Chicago Cubs
2017	Zach Rutherford	6	Tampa Bay Rays
2017	Jared Young	15	Chicago Cubs
2017	Adam Bainbridge	30	Kansas City Royals
2019	Vinnie Pasquantino	11	Kansas City Royals
2019	Bryce Windham	32	Chicago Cubs
2021	Hunter Gregory	8	Toronto Blue Jays
2021	Aaron Holiday	13	Oakland Athletics
2021	Ryne Moore	18	Milwaukee Brewers
2022	Noah Dean	5	Boston Red Sox
2022	Matt Coutney	10	Los Angeles Angels
2022	Andy Garriola	17	Chicago Cubs
2023	Sam Armstrong	13	Chicago Cubs

== Retired numbers ==
The ODU Baseball Monarchs have retired two jerseys in their history. The jersey number 3 was retired former New York Yankee outfielder and ODU Baseball Head Coach Bud Metheny who compiled an overall record of 423–363–6 during his 31 years at ODU and was inducted into the American Association of College Baseball Coaches Hall of Fame in 1984 and the ODU Hall of Fame in 1982. While playing for the Yankees Metheny won the 1943 World Series. Coach Metheny was named the East Region National Coach of the Year in 1963 and the Bud Metheny Baseball Complex where ODU currently plays was named for him.

The second jersey is number 35 for current San Francisco Giants pitcher Justin Verlander. Verlander was the second overall pick in the 2004 MLB draft. He was inducted into the ODU Hall of Fame in 2012 and holds the ODU, Virginia, and Colonial Athletic Association all-time record for career strikeouts and earning Freshman All-American honors. As of 2014 Justin Verlander is the only former Monarch to have played in the World Series pitching in two for Detroit in 2006 and 2012. In 2006 as a rookie Verlander pitched in games 1 and 5 against the Cardinals going 0–2. In the 2012 series Verlander pitched game 1 taking the loss as the Giants swept the Tigers in four games for the championship. Verlander won the AL Rookie of the Year in 2006 when he went to his first World Series and has also won the 2011 AL MVP and Cy Young Award. He has also pitched two no hitters in his career, once on June 12, 2007 against Milwaukee and again on May 7, 2011 against Toronto.

== Bud Metheny Ballpark ==
The Monarchs have played at the Bud Metheny Baseball Complex since it opened in 1983. The complex has a total capacity of 2,500 people with the stadium record being 2,125 on the day of its dedication. The facilities contain coaches offices beneath the first base bleachers and the player locker room beneath the third base bleachers. In 2009 the field obtained a new video board and in 2011 a batter's eye was erected. The facility also has a beer garden in the first baseline foul area, an all turf halo behind home plate, a turf stretching/bunting area, and the Paul Keyes Indoor Hitting Facility.

In 2025, the complex was demolished and will be replaced by the Ellmer Family Baseball Complex by the 2026 season.

== See also ==
- List of NCAA Division I baseball programs
- Old Dominion Monarchs
