= Jim McGuire (baseball coach) =

American college baseball coach

Current position
- Title: Head coach
- Team: Vol State CC
- Conference: TCCAA
- Record: 0–0

Biographical details
- Born: Belleville, Illinois, U.S.

Playing career
- 1982: Illinois State
- 1983: Rend Lake
- 1984–1985: Cumberland

Coaching career (HC unless noted)
- 1986: UMSL (Asst.)
- 1987–1988: Rend Lake (Asst.)
- 1989–1992: Rend Lake
- 1993–2012: Middle Tennessee (Asst.)
- 2013–2018: Middle Tennessee
- 2022–present: Vol State CC

Head coaching record
- Overall: 162–175–1
- Tournaments: C-USA: 3-4

Jim McGuire in an American college baseball coach, currently serving as head coach of the Middle Tennessee Blue Raiders baseball program. He was named to that position prior to the 2013 season.

McGuire's playing career began in 1982 at Illinois State. After one season, he transferred to Rend Lake, a junior college. He then completed his eligibility at Division II Cumberland. McGuire spent the 1986 season as an assistant at UMSL. He then returned to Rend Lake, serving two seasons as an assistant before being elevated to the top job in 1989. After four years, he joined Middle Tennessee as an assistant. He served as an assistant for eight years before becoming associate head coach following the 2000 season. McGuire was named head coach after the 2012 season.

== Head coaching record ==
The following lists McGuire's record as a head coach at the Division I level.

Record table
Season	Team	Overall	Conference	Standing	Postseason
Rend Lake College Warriors (Records Not Available) (1989–1992)
Middle Tennessee (Sun Belt Conference) (2013)
2013	Middle Tennessee	28–28	11–19	9th	
Middle Tennessee (Conference USA) (2014–2018)
2014	Middle Tennessee	31–27	17–13	T-5th	C-USA Tournament
2015	Middle Tennessee	30-25	19-11	4th	C-USA Tournament
2016	Middle Tennessee	20–35	5–24	12th	
2017	Middle Tennessee	24–31	10–20	10th	
2018	Middle Tennessee	27–27–1	12–17–1	9th	
Middle Tennessee:		162–175–1	74–104–1		
Total:		162–175–1			
National champion Postseason invitational champion Conference regular season champion Conference regular season and conference tournament champion Division regular season champion Division regular season and conference tournament champion Conference tournament champion

== See also ==
- List of current NCAA Division I baseball coaches
