= 2009 Colonial Athletic Association baseball tournament =

American college baseball tournament

- Teams: 6
- Format: Double-elimination tournament
- Finals site: Brooks Field; Wilmington, North Carolina
- Champions: Georgia State (1st title)
- Winning coach: Greg Frady (1st title)
- MVP: Bradley Logan (Georgia State)

2009 Colonial Athletic Association baseball standings
	Conf.				Overall
Team	W		L	PCT	W		L	PCT
George Mason ‍†‍‍^{y}	19	–	5	.792	42	–	14	.750
Georgia State ‍‍‡‍^{y}	12	–	9	.571	39	–	22	.639
UNC Wilmington ‍‍‍	10	–	8	.556	31	–	23	.574
Northeastern ‍‍‍	13	–	11	.542	28	–	25	.528
Old Dominion ‍‍‍	13	–	11	.542	22	–	27	.449
Delaware ‍‍‍	11	–	10	.524	28	–	20	.583
James Madison ‍‍‍	12	–	11	.522	30	–	24	.556
Towson ‍‍‍	12	–	12	.500	28	–	25	.528
William & Mary ‍‍‍	9	–	14	.391	24	–	25	.490
VCU ‍‍‍	8	–	16	.333	20	–	26	.435
Hofstra ‍‍‍	6	–	18	.250	11	–	32	.256
‡ – Tournament champion y – Invited to the NCAA tournament As of June 30, 2009; Rankings from Collegiate Baseball

The 2009 Colonial Athletic Association baseball tournament was held at Brooks Field in Wilmington, North Carolina, from May 21 through 24. The event determined the champion of the Colonial Athletic Association for the 2009 season. Second-seeded Georgia State won the tournament for the first (and only) time and earned the CAA's automatic bid to the 2009 NCAA Division I baseball tournament.

Entering the event, former member East Carolina had won the most championships, with seven. Among active members, VCU led with four titles, Old Dominion had won three titles while George Mason and UNC Wilmington had won twice each and James Madison and William & Mary had each won once.

== Format and seeding ==
The top six teams from the CAA's round-robin regular season qualified for the tournament. Teams were seeded by conference winning percentage. They played a double-elimination tournament.

Team	W	L	Pct.	GB	Seed
George Mason	19	5	.792	—	1
Georgia State	12	9	.571	5.5	2
UNC Wilmington	10	8	.556	6	3
Old Dominion	13	11	.542	6	4
Northeastern	13	11	.542	6	5
Delaware	11	10	.524	6.5	6
James Madison	12	11	.522	6.5	—
Towson	12	12	.500	7	—
William & Mary	9	14	.391	9.5	—
VCU	8	16	.333	11	—
Hofstra	6	18	.250	13	—

== Bracket and results ==
First round
1	George Mason	6
6	Delaware	5
3	UNC Wilmington	7
4	Old Dominion	5
2	Georgia State	6
5	Northeastern	5

Second round
1	George Mason	11
4	Old Dominion	5
3	UNC Wilmington	5
2	Georgia State	8
6	Delaware	9
5	Northeastern	5

Third round
1	George Mason	3
2	Georgia State	9
3	UNC Wilmington	5
6	Delaware	4

Semifinals
1	George Mason	3
3	UNC Wilmington	5

Final
2	Georgia State	12	—
3	UNC Wilmington	10	—

== All-Tournament Team ==
The following players were named to the All-Tournament Team.

Name	Team
Shane Davis	George Mason
Steven Davis	UNC Wilmington
Bobby Leeper	UNC Wilmington
Bradley Logan	Georgia State
Justin Malone	Georgia State
Michael McCree	Georgia State
Bill Merkler	Delaware
Marc Mimeault	Georgia State
Ryan Moore	Georgia State
Cody Stanley	UNC Wilmington
Ben Thielsen	UNC Wilmington

=== Most Valuable Player ===
Bradley Logan was named Tournament Most Valuable Player. Logan was an infielder for Georgia State.
