= 2015 Conference USA baseball tournament =

- Teams: 8
- Format: Double elimination
- Finals site: Pete Taylor Park; Hattiesburg, Mississippi
- Champions: FIU (1st title)
- Winning coach: Turtle Thomas (1st title)
- MVP: Josh Anderson (FIU)
- Television: CUSADN (First round–semifinals); CBSSN (Championship game)

2015 Conference USA baseball standings
	Conf.						Overall
Team	W		L		T	PCT	W		L		T	PCT
No. 20 Rice ‍†‍‍^{y}	22	–	8	–	0	.733	35	–	18	–	0	.660
#24 Florida Atlantic ^{y} ‍‍‍	19	–	10	–	0	.655	38	–	15	–	0	.717
Southern Miss ‍‍‍	19	–	10	–	0	.655	35	–	16	–	1	.683
Middle Tennessee ‍‍‍	19	–	11	–	0	.633	30	–	25	–	0	.545
UTSA ‍‍‍	17	–	13	–	0	.567	32	–	23	–	0	.582
UAB ‍‍‍	15	–	15	–	0	.500	30	–	24	–	0	.556
Old Dominion ‍‍‍	13	–	17	–	0	.433	27	–	27	–	0	.500
FIU ‍‍‡‍^{y}	13	–	17	–	0	.433	25	–	29	–	0	.463
Marshall ‍‍‍	12	–	18	–	0	.400	20	–	32	–	0	.385
Charlotte ‍‍‍	11	–	19	–	0	.367	19	–	29	–	0	.396
WKU ‍‍‍	10	–	19	–	0	.345	24	–	28	–	0	.462
Louisiana Tech ‍‍‍	8	–	21	–	0	.276	25	–	27	–	0	.481
† – Conference champion ‡ – Tournament champion y – Invited to the NCAA tournament As of May 5, 2015; Rankings from Collegiate Baseball

The 2015 Conference USA baseball tournament was held from May 20 through 24 at Pete Taylor Park in Hattiesburg, Mississippi. The annual tournament determined the conference champion of the Division I Conference USA for college baseball. The tournament champion received the league's automatic bid to the 2015 NCAA Division I baseball tournament.

The tournament was established in 1996, Conference USA's first season of play. Rice has won the most championships, with six.

== Seeding and format ==
The top eight finishers from the regular season will be seeded one through eight. The tournament will use a double elimination format.

== Bracket and results ==
First round
1	Rice	5
8	FIU	6
4	Middle Tennessee	7
5	UTSA	9
1	Rice	5
4	Middle Tennessee	6
3	Southern Miss	0
6	UAB	4
2	Florida Atlantic	6
7	Old Dominion	4
7	Old Dominion	0
3	Southern Miss	2*

Second round
8	FIU	15
5	UTSA	5
4	Middle Tennessee	5
5	UTSA	4
6	UAB	2
2	Florida Atlantic	1
3	Southern Miss	4
2	Florida Atlantic	5

Semifinals
8	FIU	15	–
4	Middle Tennessee	3	–
6	UAB	10	–
2	Florida Atlantic	0	–

Final
8	FIU	8
6	UAB	2

== Conference championship ==
Conference USA Championship
(6) UAB Blazers	vs.	(8) FIU Panthers

May 24, 2015, 1:41 p.m. (CDT) at Pete Taylor Park in Hattiesburg, Mississippi
Team	1	2	3	4	5	6	7	8	9	R	H	E
(6) UAB	0	0	0	0	0	1	1	0	0	2	8	1
(8) FIU	4	0	1	0	1	2	0	0	X	8	8	2
WP: Christopher Mourelle (7–7) LP: James Naile (10–4); Home runs: UAB: None; FIU: Julius Gaines (1); Josh Anderson (1); Austin Rodriguez (1); Attendance: 1,703
