= Chris Finwood =

American baseball coach

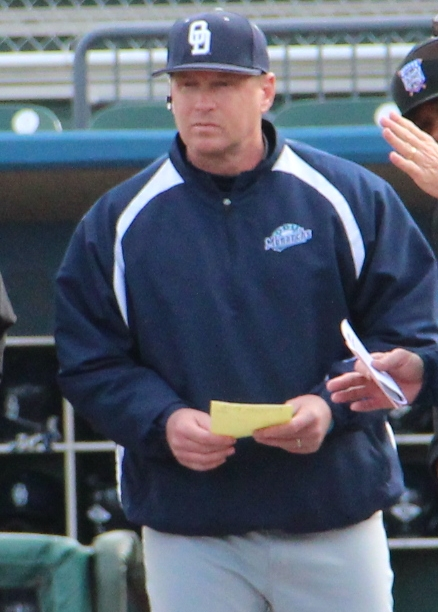
- Finwood in 2014

Current position
- Title: Head coach
- Team: Old Dominion
- Conference: Sun Belt
- Record: 441–356–0 (.553)

Biographical details
- Born: January 20, 1966 (age 60); Plattsburgh, New York, U.S.
- Education: VMI

Playing career
- 1985–1988: VMI
- Position: SS

Coaching career (HC unless noted)
- 1989–1991: VMI (asst.)
- 1992–1994: VMI
- 1995–2000: VCU (Asst.)
- 2001–2005: Auburn (Asst.)
- 2006–2011: Western Kentucky
- 2012–present: Old Dominion

Head coaching record
- Overall: 683–607–0 (.529)
- Tournaments: NCAA: 3–6

Accomplishments and honors

Championships
- Sun Belt Tournament (2008); Sun Belt Regular season (2009)

Awards
- ABCA East Region Coach of the Year (2014); Sun Belt Coach of the Year (2009)

Chris Finwood (born January 20, 1966) is an American baseball coach and former shortstop, who is the current head baseball coach of the Old Dominion Monarchs. He played college baseball at the Virginia Military Institute for coaches Donny White and Paul Maini from 1985 to 1988. He then served as the head coach of the VMI Keydets (1992–1994) and the Western Kentucky Hilltoppers (2006–2011). Finwood has coached 61 players who were selected in the MLB Players Draft including 3 major leaguers.

== VMI ==
Finwood was a standout shortstop at VMI, where he was named to the SoCon's All-North Division team three times. His .399 batting average remains sixth in school history. He also ranks highly on the program's all-time lists for hits and runs. He began coaching at VMI, serving as an assistant from 1989 through 1991 before being elevated to head coach. In his three years as a head coach, the Keydets went from 2 wins in 1991 to 21 wins in both 1993 and 1994, and played in the 1993 Southern Conference baseball tournament championship game.

== VCU and Auburn ==
Finwood then moved to VCU, serving as assistant for four years and associate head coach for two. The Rams won more than 40 games in both 1998 and 1999, including a school record 46 in 1998. Both seasons, VCU earned trips to the NCAA Division I Baseball Championship and won CAA regular season titles in 1997 and 1998. He then moved to Auburn where he worked as an assistant for five seasons. He was responsible for the Tiger defense and also served as recruiting coordinator. Auburn recorded the two highest fielding percentages in school history, and ranked highly in both the SEC and nationally. The Tigers reached four NCAA tournaments.

== WKU ==
After his time at Auburn, Finwood earned the head coaching position at Western Kentucky. From his first to his third season, the Hilltoppers improved by 11 conference wins, claimed a conference tournament title, and reached the first of two straight NCAA Regionals. In 2009, WKU won 42 games, a share of the regular season title, and earned an at-large bid to the NCAA tournament. Finwood saw 17 Hilltoppers drafted, 55 sign professional contracts, and three players reached Major League Baseball. WKU ranked highly in defense, finishing third in the nation in 2009, and fifteenth in 2011.

== Old Dominion ==
In June 2011, Finwood accepted the head coaching position at Old Dominion. The Monarchs improved from last to fourth in the CAA in the course of his first two seasons. However, due to the fact that ODU was moving to Conference USA the CAA officials ruled that they were ineligible for the conference tournament after winning 30 games and what would have been the third seed in the conference tournament.

In 2014 Coach Finwood gave ODU its first ever C-USA victory in a 2–1 extra inning win on the road over then 15th ranked Rice Owls for his 300th career win. In just his third season at Old Dominion Coach Finwood lead the Monarchs to their first ever win over the number 1 ranked team in the country with an 8–1 victory over the Virginia Cavaliers at Harbor Park in Norfolk, reached the semifinals of the 2014 Conference USA baseball tournament, and earned an at-large bid in the Columbia, SC Regional of the 2014 NCAA tournament, the school's eighth appearance and first since 2000. The 2014 team finished the year third in the NCAA in double plays turned and first in Conference USA in double plays, doubles, HBPs, runs, stolen bases, and second in triples.

In his four years at Old Dominion to date Finwood has had five players drafted (six picks) in the MLB Draft, two All-Americans, and several All-Conference selections as well as two victories over a #1 ranked team.

== Head coaching record ==
Record table
| Season | Team | Overall | Conference | Standing | Postseason |
|---|---|---|---|---|---|
VMI Keydets (Southern Conference) (1992–1994)
| 1992 | VMI | 11–39 | 4–15 | 8th (8) | SoCon tournament (Note: All eight of the SoCon's teams qualified for the tournament in 1992.) |
| 1993 | VMI | 20–29 | 5–15 | 8th (9) | SoCon tournament (Note: The top eight finishers of the SoCon's nine teams qualified for the tournament in 1993.) |
| 1994 | VMI | 21–29 | 10–13 | 7th (9) | SoCon tournament (Note: The top eight finishers of the SoCon's nine teams qualified for the tournament in 1994.) |
| VMI: | | 52–97–0 (.349) | 19–43–0 (.306) | | |
Western Kentucky Hilltoppers (Sun Belt Conference) (2006–2011)
| 2006 | WKU | 22–30 | 5–18 | 8th (9) | |
| 2007 | WKU | 25–30 | 15–15 | 7th (11) | |
| 2008 | WKU | 33–27 | 16–14 | 5th (11) | NCAA Regional |
| 2009 | WKU | 42–20 | 21–8 | T-1st (11) | NCAA Regional |
| 2010 | WKU | 35–23 | 16–14 | 6th (10) | |
| 2011 | WKU | 33–24 | 17–13 | 4th (10) | |
| WKU: | | 190–154–0 (.552) | 90–72–0 (.556) | | |
Old Dominion Monarchs (Colonial Athletic Association) (2012–2013)
| 2012 | Old Dominion | 19–34 | 9–21 | 11th (11) | |
| 2013 | Old Dominion | 30–24 | 15–12 | T-3rd (10) | (Note: Old Dominion and Georgia State were not eligible for the 2013 CAA tournament due to their planned departures from the conference after the season.) |
| Old Dominion: | | 0–0–0 (–) | 24–33–0 (.421) | | |
Old Dominion Monarchs (Conference USA) (2014–2022)
| 2014 | Old Dominion | 36–26 | 17–13 | T-4th (13) (Note: The top eight finishers of C-USA's thirteen teams qualified for the tournament in 2014.) | NCAA Regional |
| 2015 | Old Dominion | 27–29 | 13–17 | 7th (12) | |
| 2016 | Old Dominion | 32–24 | 15–15 | 6th | |
| 2017 | Old Dominion | 37–21 | 19–11 | 2nd | C–USA tournament |
| 2018 | Old Dominion | 15–37 | 7–22 | T-11th | |
| 2019 | Old Dominion | 35–21 | 16–14 | 5th | C–USA tournament |
| 2020 | Old Dominion | 12–4 | 0–0 | | Season canceled due to COVID-19 |
| 2021 | Old Dominion | 39–14 | 22–10 | 4th | NCAA Regional |
| 2022 | Old Dominion | 41–17 | 19–11 | T–3rd | |
| Old Dominion: | | 391–302–0 (.564) | 128–113–0 (.531) | | |
Old Dominion Monarchs (Sun Belt Conference) (2023–present)
| 2023 | Old Dominion | 32–23 | 15–15 | 10th | |
| 2024 | Old Dominion | 31–26 | 15–15 | 5th (East) | |
| 2025 | Old Dominion | 21–28 | 15–14 | 6th | Sun Belt tournament |
| 2026 | Old Dominion | 29–26 | 15–15 | 8th | Sun Belt tournament |
| Old Dominion: | | 441–356–0 (.553) | 60–59–0 (.504) | | |
| Total: | | 683–607–0 (.529) | | | |
National champion Postseason invitational champion Conference regular season champion Conference regular season and conference tournament champion Division regular season champion Division regular season and conference tournament champion Conference tournament champion

== See also ==
- List of current NCAA Division I baseball coaches
