= Connor Overton =

American baseball player (born 1993)

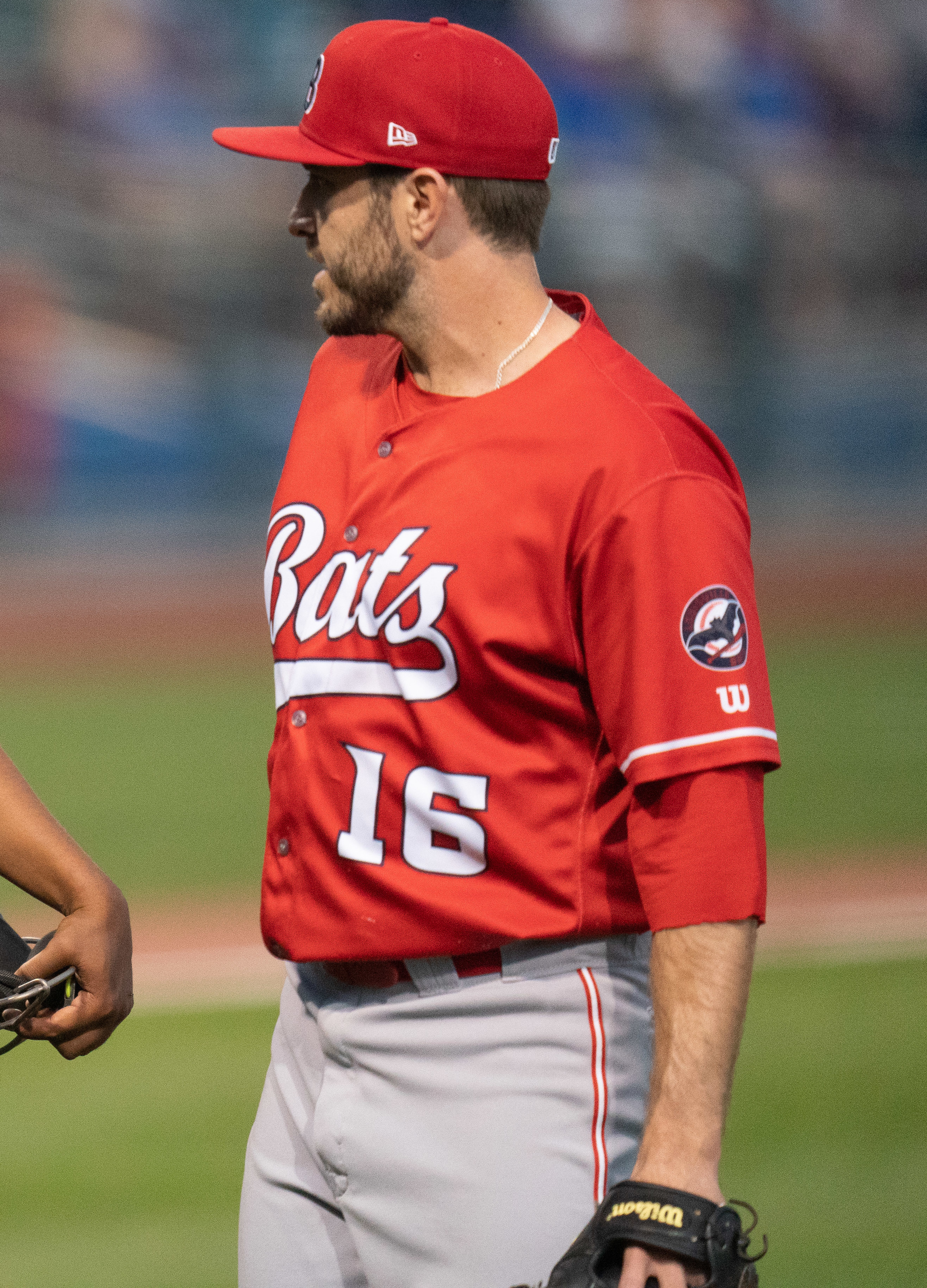
- Overton with the Louisville Bats in 2022

Southern Maryland Blue Crabs – No. 23
- Pitcher
- Born: July 24, 1993 (age 33); Richmond, Virginia, U.S.
- Bats: Left Throws: Right

MLB debut
- August 12, 2021, for the Toronto Blue Jays

MLB statistics (through 2023 season)
- Win–loss record: 1–2
- Earned run average: 4.85
- Strikeouts: 38
- Stats at Baseball Reference

Teams
- Toronto Blue Jays (2021); Pittsburgh Pirates (2021); Cincinnati Reds (2022–2023)

Connor Danford Overton (born July 24, 1993) is an American professional baseball pitcher for the Southern Maryland Blue Crabs of the Atlantic League of Professional Baseball. He has previously played in Major League Baseball (MLB) for the Toronto Blue Jays, Pittsburgh Pirates, and Cincinnati Reds.

== Early life and amateur career ==
Overton was born in Richmond, Virginia and grew up in the Richmond suburb of Mechanicsville, Virginia. He attended Atlee High School, where was a relief pitcher and primarily played shortstop. Overton attended Old Dominion University and played college baseball for the Old Dominion Monarchs.

== Professional career ==
=== Miami Marlins ===
The Miami Marlins selected Overton in the 15th round of the 2014 Major League Baseball draft. Overton made his professional debut with the Low-A Batavia Muckdogs, pitching to a 4.71 ERA in 17 appearances. He began the 2015 season with the Single-A Greensboro Grasshoppers, but was released by the Marlins on July 9, 2015, after struggling to a 13.03 ERA in 8 games.

=== Washington Nationals ===
On July 17, 2015, Overton signed a minor league contract with the Washington Nationals organization. He split the remainder of the year with the Low-A Auburn Doubledays, logging a 3.72 ERA in 12 games, and also pitched in one game for the Triple-A Syracuse Chiefs. He elected free agency following the season on November 6.

=== Sioux City Explorers ===
Overton signed with the Sioux City Explorers of the independent American Association of Professional Baseball on April 13, 2016. He went 5–1 on the season with a 1.96 ERA and 11 saves and was named a league All-Star before signing with the Giants.

=== San Francisco Giants ===
On August 11, 2016, Overton signed a minor league contract with the San Francisco Giants. Overton appeared in one game for the High-A San Jose Giants, allowing 2 earned runs in 1/3 of an inning before undergoing Tommy John surgery and missing the entire 2017 season. He split the 2018 season between three affiliates: San Jose, the Double-A Richmond Flying Squirrels, and the Triple-A Sacramento River Cats. In 23 appearances between the three teams, Overton posted a cumulative 4.91 ERA with 48 strikeouts in 47 2/3 innings of work. Overton returned to Richmond to begin the 2019 season, and posted a 3.62 ERA in 14 appearances for the team. On June 12, 2019, Overton was released by the Giants organization.

=== Lancaster Barnstormers ===
On August 6, 2019, Overton signed with the Lancaster Barnstormers of the Atlantic League of Professional Baseball. In 9 games with the team, he registered a 4.02 ERA with 56 strikeouts in 53 2/3 innings of work. He became a free agent following the season.

=== Toronto Blue Jays ===
On February 29, 2020, Overton signed a minor league contract with the Toronto Blue Jays and was assigned to the Double–A New Hampshire Fisher Cats. Overton did not play in a game in 2020 due to the cancellation of the minor league season because of the COVID-19 pandemic. He became a free agent on November 2, 2020. Overton re–signed with the Blue Jays on a minor league contract on February 2, 2021. He was assigned to the Triple-A Buffalo Bisons to begin the year, where he pitched to a 2.03 ERA with 50 strikeouts in 21 appearances.

The Blue Jays selected Overton's contract and promoted him the major leagues for the first time on August 11, 2021. The next day, he made his major league debut against the Los Angeles Angels. In 4 appearances for the Blue Jays during his debut campaign, Overton did not give up a run, while striking out four. On September 3, Overton was designated for assignment by the Blue Jays.

=== Pittsburgh Pirates ===
On September 6, 2021, Overton was claimed off waivers by the Pittsburgh Pirates. On September 16, Overton pitched three scoreless innings against the Cincinnati Reds. In doing so, Overton made MLB history, having the most career innings without allowing a run, with 10 2/3 innings pitched. His streak ended at 13 2/3 innings after he allowed a home run to Didi Gregorius of the Philadelphia Phillies on September 23. Overton was shut down for the season on September 28 after he was placed on the injured list with a right shoulder strain. He finished the season with a combined 4.70 ERA in 9 appearances between the Blue Jays and Pirates, striking out 15 in 15 1/3 innings of work. On November 6, Overton was outrighted off of the 40-man roster. He elected free agency on November 7.

=== Cincinnati Reds ===
On November 17, 2021, Overton signed a minor league contract with the Cincinnati Reds. He was assigned to the Triple–A Louisville Bats to begin the 2022 season.

On April 30, 2022, Overton was selected to the active roster to start against the Colorado Rockies. On May 12, Overton earned his first career win, tossing 6 1/3 scoreless innings against the Pittsburgh Pirates. On May 23, an MRI revealed Overton had a stress reaction in his lower back and he was placed on the 60-day injured list. Overton was activated from the injured list on September 24. He started four games for the Reds, finishing with a 1–0 record and 2.73 ERA with 14 strikeouts over 33 innings.

Overton began the 2023 season out of Cincinnati's rotation, making 3 starts for the team. On April 15, 2023, Overton was placed on the injured list with a right elbow strain. The injury was suffered in a start against the Philadelphia Phillies in which he allowed 5 earned runs over 3 innings pitched. On May 7, manager David Bell said that Overton would be out until at least mid-July, and Overton was transferred to the 60-day injured list on May 14. He underwent Tommy John surgery on May 23, officially ending his season. On October 9, Overton was removed from the 40–man roster and sent outright to Triple–A Louisville.

In 2024, Overton made 17 rehab appearances for the rookie-level Arizona Complex League Reds, High-A Dayton Dragons, and Louisville, struggling to a 1-2 record and 7.85 ERA with 28 strikeouts across 36 2/3 innings pitched. He elected free agency following the season on November 4, 2024.

=== Toronto Blue Jays (second stint) ===
On February 19, 2025, Overton signed a minor league contract with the New York Mets. He was released by the Mets prior to the start of the season on March 27.

On April 23, 2025, Overton signed a minor league contract with the Toronto Blue Jays. In eight appearances (three starts) split between the rookie-level Florida Complex League Blue Jays, Single-A Dunedin Blue Jays, and Triple-A Buffalo Bisons, he recorded a cumulative 7.94 ERA with 14 strikeouts over 17 innings of work. Overton was released by the Blue Jays organization on June 30.

=== Southern Maryland Blue Crabs ===
On July 22, 2025, Overton signed with the Southern Maryland Blue Crabs of the Atlantic League of Professional Baseball. He made 11 starts for Southern Maryland, logging a 2—5 record and 5.45 ERA with 76 strikeouts across 66 innings of work.

== See also ==
- List of baseball players who underwent Tommy John surgery
