= Mark Newman (baseball) =

American baseball executive (1949–2020)

- Born: April 20, 1949; Los Angeles, California, U.S.
- Died: September 12, 2020 (aged 71); Tampa, Florida, U.S.
- Education: Southern Illinois University
- Occupation: Baseball executive
- Years active: 1989–2014

Mark Ryan Newman (April 20, 1949 – September 12, 2020) was an American professional baseball executive. He served as the senior vice president of baseball operations for the New York Yankees of Major League Baseball and spent 26 years in high-level player development and player personnel posts with their organization. He first joined the Yankees in 1989 after 18 years as a college baseball pitching and head coach.

== Early career ==
Newman was born in 1949. After graduating from high school in Wheeling, Illinois, Newman attended Southern Illinois University, where he played college baseball as a pitcher and second baseman for the Southern Illinois Salukis. In 1969, he played collegiate summer baseball with the Orleans Cardinals of the Cape Cod Baseball League.

He began his coaching career as pitching coach at Southern Illinois from 1972 through 1980, then was head baseball coach at Old Dominion University (ODU) from 1981–89. In nine seasons at ODU, Newman's teams compiled a win–loss record of 321–167–3, won one league championship, and advanced to four conference finals and two NCAA baseball regionals. He was named Coach of the Year in the Sun Belt Conference and in the Commonwealth of Virginia in 1985 and 1987.

Newman earned a law degree from Southern Illinois University in 1978. He was inducted into the halls of fame of both Southern Illinois (2000) and Old Dominion (1997) universities.

== New York Yankees ==
After the 1989 college season, Newman was appointed the Yankees' coordinator of minor league instruction, serving in that role through 1996 before his promotion to vice president, player development and scouting. During Newman's first decade with the Yankees, the team's farm system produced the core of its Joe Torre-era dynasty that won four world championships in five seasons: Mariano Rivera, Derek Jeter, Jorge Posada, Bernie Williams, Andy Pettitte, and others. He was promoted in 2000 to senior vice president of baseball operations, based at the Yankees' Tampa facilities. In 2010, Minor League Baseball selected him as the winner of the Sheldon "Chief" Bender Award, which honors individuals for their distinguished service in player development.

Newman retired from the Yankees at the conclusion of the 2014 season.

== Death ==
In retirement, Newman coached youth baseball and basketball in the Tampa area. He died unexpectedly on September 12, 2020, with the New York Post reporting that he died in his sleep.
