= Reese Smith Jr. Field =

Baseball park in Murfreesboro, Tennessee, U.S.

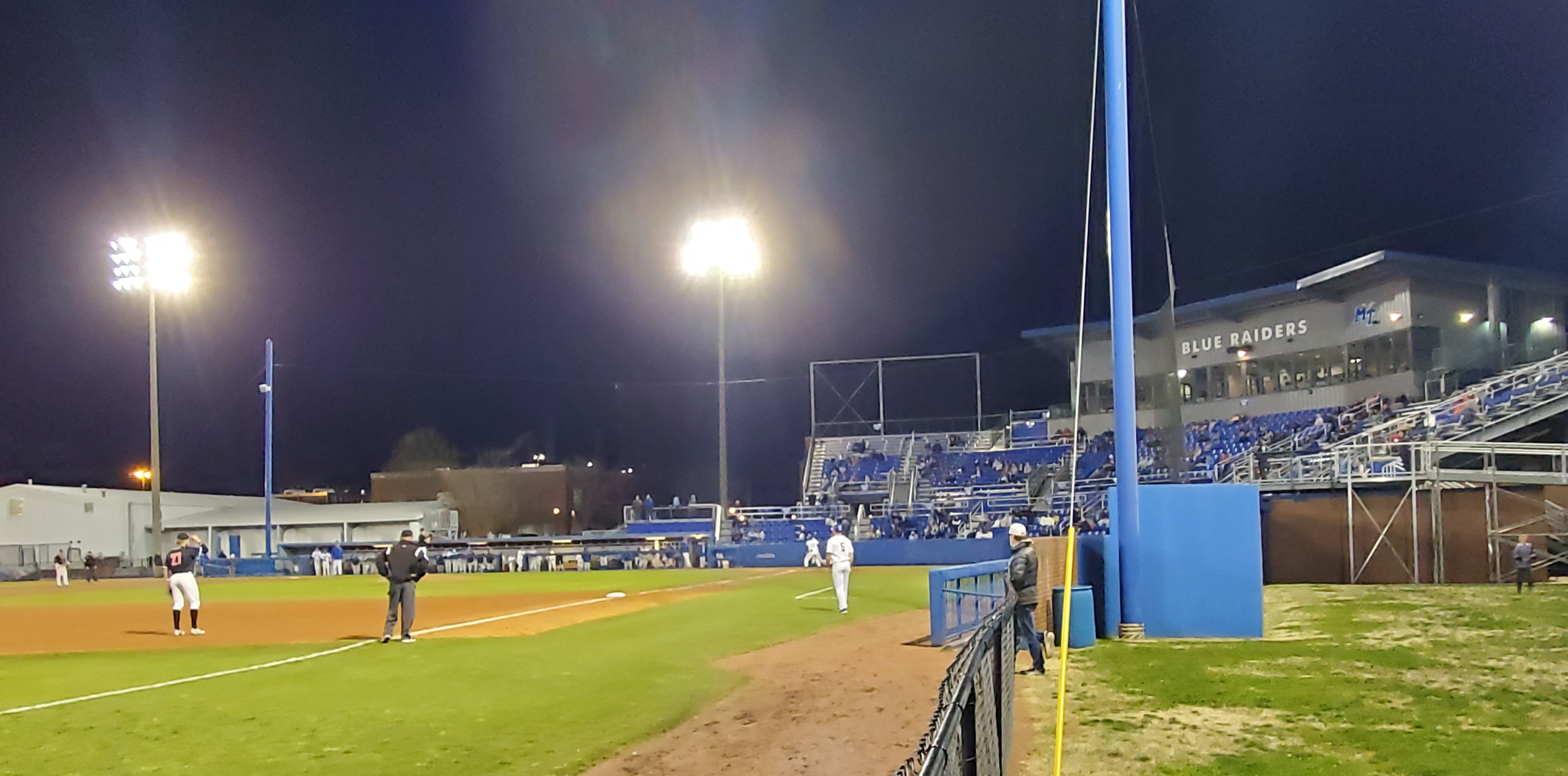
- Interactive map of Reese Smith Jr. Field
- Address: 635 Champion Way; Murfreesboro, Tennessee; U.S.
- Coordinates: 35.85087°N 86.366454°W
- Owner: Middle Tennessee State University
- Operator: Middle Tennessee State University
- Capacity: 2,600
- Surface: Grass
- Scoreboard: Electronic
- Record attendance: 3,020 (Vanderbilt, April 20, 2004)
- Field size: Left field: 330 ft (100 m); Left-center field: 365 ft (111 m); Center field: 390 ft (120 m); Right-center field: 365 ft (111 m); Right Field: 330 ft (100 m)

Construction
- Built: 1979 (47 years ago)
- Renovated: 1989 (37 years ago)

Tenant
- MTSU Blue Raiders (CUSA) 1979–present

Website
- Reese Smith Jr. Field

Reese Smith Jr. Field is a baseball park located on the campus of Middle Tennessee State University (MTSU) in Murfreesboro, Tennessee, United States. It is home of the Middle Tennessee Blue Raiders baseball team, a member of the Division I Conference USA. The park was built in 1979 and has a capacity of 2,600 people. It was renovated in 1989.

The field is named after Reese Smith, Jr., a former baseball player at Middle Tennessee. The field was dedicated to him on April 12, 1983.

== Renovations/features ==
In 1989, the field was significantly renovated. Seating capacity was increased to its current 2,600. Additionally, new backstops and fences were constructed.

Other features of the field include a press box, concessions, bullpens, hitting cages, and an underground sprinkler system.

In 1998, the Stephen B. Smith Clubhouse and Indoor Training Facility was built. The facility features a lounge, trophy case, lockers, indoor training area, and coaches' offices. It is attached to the field itself with a brick and iron fence.

== See also ==
- List of NCAA Division I baseball venues
