= 2014 Conference USA baseball tournament =

- Teams: 8
- Format: Double elimination
- Finals site: Pete Taylor Park; Hattiesburg, MS
- Champions: Rice (6th title)
- Winning coach: Wayne Graham (6th title)
- MVP: Michael Aquino (Rice)
- Television: CUSADN (first round–semifinals); CBSSN (championship game)

2014 Conference USA baseball standings
	Conf.						Overall
Team	W		L		T	PCT	W		L		T	PCT
No. 26 Rice ‍†‍‡‍^{y}	23	–	7	–	0	.767	42	–	20	–	0	.677
UAB ‍‍‍	20	–	10	–	0	.667	35	–	21	–	0	.625
Southern Miss ‍‍‍	19	–	11	–	0	.633	35	–	25	–	0	.583
Middle Tennessee ‍‍‍	17	–	13	–	0	.567	31	–	27	–	0	.534
Old Dominion ‍‍‍^{y}	17	–	13	–	0	.567	36	–	26	–	0	.581
East Carolina ‍‍‍	16	–	14	–	0	.533	33	–	26	–	0	.559
UTSA ‍‍‍	16	–	14	–	0	.533	35	–	26	–	0	.574
FIU ‍‍‍	16	–	14	–	0	.533	36	–	20	–	0	.643
Florida Atlantic ‍‍‍	14	–	16	–	0	.467	28	–	25	–	0	.528
Tulane ‍‍‍	10	–	18	–	0	.357	23	–	29	–	0	.442
Marshall ‍‍‍	10	–	19	–	0	.345	20	–	31	–	0	.392
Charlotte ‍‍‍	10	–	19	–	0	.345	19	–	31	–	1	.382
Louisiana Tech ‍‍‍	5	–	25	–	0	.167	15	–	35	–	0	.300
† – Conference champion ‡ – Tournament champion y – Invited to the NCAA tournament Rankings from Collegiate Baseball

The 2014 Conference USA baseball tournament was held from May 21 through 25 at Pete Taylor Park in Hattiesburg, Mississippi. The annual tournament determines the conference champion of the Division I Conference USA for college baseball. The tournament champion received the league's automatic bid to the 2014 NCAA Division I baseball tournament. This is the last of 19 athletic championship events held by the conference in the 2013–14 academic year.

The tournament was established in 1996, Conference USA's first season of play. Tulane and Rice have won the most championships, with five. Among current, returning teams, only Marshall has never won a title. The conference adds eight new teams for 2014.

== Seeding and format ==
The top eight finishers from the regular season were seeded one through eight. The tournament returned to a double-elimination format, previously used from 1996 through 2010.

Team	W	L	Pct	GB	Seed
Rice	23	7	.767	–	1
UAB	20	10	.667	3	2
Southern Miss	19	11	.633	4	3
Middle Tennessee	17	13	.567	6	4
Old Dominion	17	13	.567	6	5
East Carolina	16	14	.533	7	6
UTSA	16	14	.533	7	7
FIU	16	14	.533	7	8
Florida Atlantic	14	16	.467	9	–
Tulane	10	18	.357	12	–
Marshall	10	19	.345	12.5	–
Charlotte	10	19	.345	12.5	–
Louisiana Tech	5	25	.167	18	–

== Bracket and results ==
First round May 21–22
5	Old Dominion	2
4	Middle Tennessee	3
8	FIU	2
1	Rice	9
5	Old Dominion	3
8	FIU	2
7	UTSA	4
2	UAB	2
6	East Carolina	9
3	Southern Miss	8
3	Southern Miss	4
2	UAB	3

Second round May 22–24
4	Middle Tennessee	2
1	Rice	8
4	Middle Tennessee	1
5	Old Dominion	2
7	UTSA	8
6	East Carolina	3
3	Southern Miss	3
6	East Carolina	1

Semifinals; May 24
1	Rice	2	7
5	Old Dominion	3	5
7	UTSA	7	7
3	Southern Miss	8	0

Finals; May 25
1	Rice	11
7	UTSA	5

=== Schedule ===
G#	Game	Date	Kickoff (CT)	TV
First round
1	Old Dominion vs Middle Tennessee	May 21, 2014	9:00 am	CUSADN
2	FIU vs Rice	May 21, 2014	12:30 pm	CUSADN
3	UTSA vs UAB	May 21, 2014	4:00 pm	CUSADN
4	East Carolina vs Southern Miss	May 21, 2014	7:30 pm	CUSADN
5	Old Dominion vs FIU	May 22, 2014	9:00 am	CUSADN
6	Southern Miss vs UAB	May 22, 2014	12:30 pm	CUSADN
Second round
7	Middle Tennessee vs Rice	May 22, 2014	4:00 pm	CUSADN
8	UTSA vs East Carolina	May 22, 2014	7:30 pm	CUSADN
9	Middle Tennessee vs Old Dominion	May 23, 2014	3:00 pm	CUSADN
10	Southern Miss vs East Carolina	May 23, 2014	6:30 pm	CUSADN
Semifinals
11	Rice vs Old Dominion^{1}	May 24, 2014	9:00 am	CUSADN
12	UTSA vs Southern Miss^{2}	May 24, 2014	12:30 pm	CUSADN
Finals
13	Rice vs UTSA	May 25, 2014	1:00 pm	CBSSN

^Note 1 Game 11 would have a necessary if winner of Game 9 also wins Game 11. If so the game would be played on May 24 at 4:00 pm.

^Note 2 Game 12 would have a necessary if winner of Game 10 also wins Game 11. If so the game would be played on May 24 at 7:30 pm.

== Conference championship ==
Conference USA Championship
(1) Rice Owls	vs.	(7) UTSA Roadrunners

May 25, 2014, 1:00 p.m. (CDT) at Pete Taylor Park in Hattiesburg, Mississippi
Team	1	2	3	4	5	6	7	8	9	R	H	E
(1) Rice	1	0	0	0	3	0	0	2	5	11	16	0
(7) UTSA	0	0	0	2	0	3	0	0	0	5	8	2
WP: Kevin McCanna (8–3) LP: Matt Sims (2–4); Home runs: Rice: Michael Aquino (1); UTSA: None; Attendance: 1,633

== All-Tournament Team ==
The following players were named to the All-Tournament Team. Rice outfielder Michael Aquino, one of five Owls selected, was named the tournament's Most Valuable Player.

Pos.	Name	Team
C	John Bormann	UTSA
IF	Nick Dawson	Southern Miss
IF	Skyler Ewing	Rice
IF	Ford Stainback	Rice
IF	Tyler Urps	Old Dominion
OF	Michael Aquino	Rice
OF	Nick Walker	Old Dominion
OF	John Welborn	UTSA
DH	Chase McDowell	Rice
P	Justin Anderson	UTSA
P	Blake Fox	Rice
P	Cameron Giannini	Southern Miss
P	Brock Hartson	UTSA
