= Tim Hummel =

American baseball player

- Infielder
- Born: November 18, 1978 (age 47); Goshen, New York, U.S.
- Batted: Right Threw: Right

MLB debut
- August 26, 2003, for the Cincinnati Reds

Last MLB appearance
- August 13, 2004, for the Cincinnati Reds

MLB statistics
- Batting average: .222
- Home runs: 3
- Runs batted in: 17
- Stats at Baseball Reference

Teams
- Cincinnati Reds (2003–2004)

Timothy Robert Hummel (born November 18, 1978) is an American former Major League Baseball player who played for the Cincinnati Reds in 2003 and 2004. He was drafted by the Chicago White Sox in the 2nd round of the 2000 Major League Baseball draft and made his debut with the Cincinnati Reds on August 26, 2003.

== Amateur career ==
Hummel was drafted out of high school in the 5th round of the 1997 Major League Baseball draft by the San Diego Padres, but did not sign, opting to attend Old Dominion University. In 1998 he played collegiate summer baseball with the Bourne Braves of the Cape Cod Baseball League, and returned to the league in 1999 and was named a league all-star for the Orleans Cardinals.

== Professional career ==
Hummel was selected in the by the Chicago White Sox in the 2nd round of the 2000 MLB draft. He spent four years in the White Sox minor league system, including a Double-A All-Star berth in 2001 and was ranked the #6 prospect in the White Sox organization in 2002, before being traded to the Cincinnati Reds on August 21, 2003, for Scott Sullivan.

He made his debut for the Reds on August 26 and hit .226 in 84 at-bats. In 2004, he batted .218 in 110 at-bats and was selected off waivers by the Boston Red Sox on September 3. In 2005, Hummel played 64 games for Triple-A Pawtucket before being sent to the St. Louis Cardinals on June 22 as part of a conditional deal. He was taken in the 2005 rule 5 draft by his original team, the White Sox. He played 28 games for Triple-A Charlotte in 2006.

== Personal ==
A former instructor at Frozen Ropes, a noted chain of training centers for aspiring baseball players, and former Director of 7 City Sports, Hummel is now the varsity Cape Henry Collegiate Baseball coach. In 2012, Tim assumed the role of Director of Auxilorary Programs at Cape Henry.

In 2011 the 7 City owners - BJ Upton, Justin Upton, and Michael Cuddyer - agreed with Tim to pursue other opportunities.
