= Bud Metheny Ballpark =

Stadium in Norfolk, Virginia

- The Bud
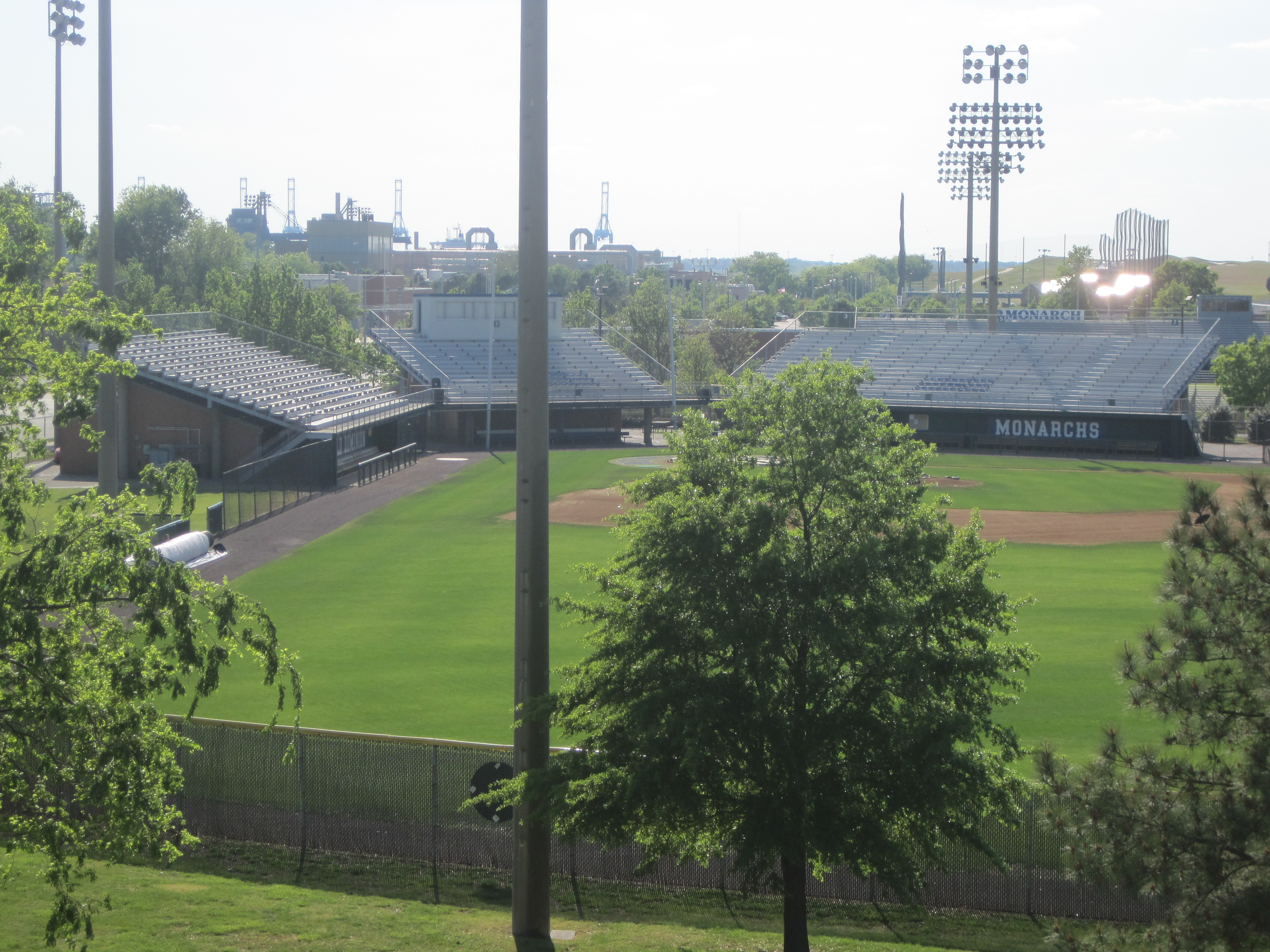
- Bud Metheny Baseball Complex The former complex in 2010
- Interactive map of Bud Metheny Ballpark
- Full name: Ellmer Family Baseball Complex at Bud Metheny Ballpark
- Former names: Bud Metheny Baseball Complex (1983–2025)
- Location: 43rd Street and Parker Avenue; Norfolk, VA 23508
- Coordinates: 36.88375°N 76.309454°W
- Owner: Old Dominion University
- Operator: Old Dominion University
- Capacity: 2,032+ (2026–present); 2,500 (1983–2025)
- Surface: Natural grass
- Scoreboard: Electronic
- Record attendance: 2,125 — April 25th, 1984 vs. Virginia Tech Hokies
- Field size: Left Field — 320 feet Left Center - 375 feet Center Field — 395 feet Right Center - 375 feet Right Field — 320 feet

Construction
- Opened: 1983, 2026
- Renovated: 2008, 2011, 2012, 2025

Tenants
- Old Dominion Monarchs baseball (NCAA) (1983–present); CAA tournament (1994); Sun Belt tournament (1983, 1985, 1987)

Website
- Bud Metheny Ballpark

The Ellmer Family Baseball Complex at Bud Metheny Ballpark is a baseball venue on the campus of Old Dominion University in Norfolk, Virginia that is currently closed for construction. It is primarily used for baseball, and is the home field of the Old Dominion Monarchs baseball team, which compete in NCAA Division I as members of the Sun Belt Conference.

The ballpark is named after former Old Dominion head basketball coach, baseball manager, and athletic director Bud Metheny, who worked for the university from 1948 to 1980 after an eleven-year stint in the New York Yankees organization including a World Series championship in 1943. He compiled a record of 423 wins, 363 losses and 6 ties as manager of the Monarchs. Metheny's jersey number, 3, has been retired by the university and is displayed on the right field wall of the stadium.

== History ==
The original Bud Metheny Baseball Complex opened for the 1983 baseball season, with the first game being a 7–2 Old Dominion win over Millersville University. The complex was not dedicated until April 25, 1984 with a game against the Virginia Tech Hokies. That night's crowd of 2,125 is the highest attendance in stadium history. The ballpark hosted the Sun Belt Conference baseball tournament in 1983, 1985, and 1987, and the Colonial Athletic Association baseball tournament in 1994. Old Dominion defended home field and won the 1985 Sun Belt and 1994 Colonial championships. The stadium has also hosted multiple Virginia district and state high school baseball tournaments. The Monarchs tied the NCAA record for double plays completed in a single game on May 14, 1985, with 7 during a home game against the Western Kentucky Hilltoppers. There have been eight no-hitters pitched at the stadium, all completed by Monarch pitchers. As of the completion of the 2021 season, Old Dominion has a record of 850 wins and 370 losses at the Bud, for a winning percentage of .697.

The previous stadium had seating for 2,500 spectators in three sections of raised aluminum bleachers. The stadium complex also included locker rooms, a concession stand, offices, four batting cages, a picnic area and a fully enclosed press box. The facility replaced the university's football stadium, Foreman Field, as the home of the baseball team upon its completion. The stadium received a new video-LED scoreboard for the 2009 season as part of a partnership between Old Dominion and CBS Collegiate Sports Properties. The facility underwent an additional three million-dollar renovation for the 2011 season that erected a batters' backdrop in center field, locker room refurbishments and a beer garden. Renovations continued before the 2012 season included brick walls added down the foul lines, a clock above the scoreboard, and a custom outfield wall with images of former Monarchs who have played in the major leagues.

On June 6, 2025, Old Dominion broke ground on the $24 million renovation of the baseball stadium, which will be coined as the Ellmer Family Baseball Complex following a $2.5 million donation from Norfolk-businessman and Board of Visitors member Dennis Ellmer. The new stadium will feature expanded locker rooms, a new medical training facility, a new club lounge behind home plate, and larger offices and meeting rooms for coaches. The ballpark is scheduled to reopen for the 2026 season.

== See also ==
- List of NCAA Division I baseball venues
- Bud Metheny Baseball Complex, Special Collections and University Archives Wiki, Old Dominion University Libraries
