= Jerry Meyers =

American college baseball coach (born 1965)

Current position
- Title: Head coach
- Team: Middle Tennessee
- Conference: C-USA
- Record: 96–128

Biographical details
- Born: March 8, 1965 (age 61)

Playing career
- 1984–1987: Iowa State
- Position: Pitcher

Coaching career (HC unless noted)
- 1989–1991: Gulf Coast CC (assistant)
- 1992–1995: UNC Wilmington (assistant)
- 1996: Old Dominion (assistant)
- 1997–2004: South Carolina (assistant)
- 2005–2010: Old Dominion
- 2011–2017: South Carolina (assistant)
- 2022: Middle Tennessee (P)
- 2023–present: Middle Tennessee

Administrative career (AD unless noted)
- 2018–2021: South Carolina (Assistant AD)

Head coaching record
- Overall: 263–286
- Tournaments: 2–10 (CAA) C-USA: 2–6

Jerry Meyers (born March 8, 1965) is an American college baseball coach and former pitcher who is the current head baseball coach for the Middle Tennessee Blue Raiders.

Meyers attended the Iowa State University from 1984-1987 before starting his coaching career as a graduate assistant at South Alabama. Later he was an assistant coach at Gulf Coast Community College, UNC-Wilmington, and Old Dominion. Prior to the 1996 season he joined the coaching staff at University of South Carolina as the pitching coach the under Ray Tanner.

== Old Dominion ==
Meyers spent eight seasons at South Carolina before being named the head baseball coach at Old Dominion University after the 2004 college baseball succeeding Tony Guzzo. During his time at ODU Meyers compiled an overall record of 167-158 in six seasons. He was named the 2006 CAA Coach of the Year and in 2008 he was the pitching coach for Team USA.

== Second stint at South Carolina ==
After six seasons Meyers left Old Dominion for USC in 2010 where he now coaches pitchers again.

Jerry Meyers coached some of the best college pitchers at South Carolina, including 2000 Golden Spikes Award winner Kip Bouknight. One common theme for the successful Gamecock pitching staffs under his leadership was the presence of a dominating closer.

Two of these closers rank in the top 10 all-time in single season saves, with one more being in the top 15.

== Personal ==
Meyers and his wife Christina have two daughters, Jaye Riley and Audrey Reese.

== Head coaching record ==
Record table
Season	Team	Overall	Conference	Standing	Postseason
Old Dominion Monarchs (Colonial Athletic Association) (2005–2010)
2005	Old Dominion	22–33	5–19	9th (9)	
2006	Old Dominion	39–17	21–9	2nd (11)	
2007	Old Dominion	35–24	18–11	2nd (11)	
2008	Old Dominion	25–27	14–14	5th (11)	
2009	Old Dominion	22–27	13–11	4th (11)	
2010	Old Dominion	24–30	11–13	6th (11)	
Old Dominion:		167–158	82–77		
Middle Tennessee Blue Raiders (Conference USA) (2023–present)
2023	Middle Tennessee	27–29	14–16	7th	C-USA Tournament
2024	Middle Tennessee	20–36	8–16	8th	C-USA Tournament
2025	Middle Tennessee	23–32	8–19	9th	
2026	Middle Tennessee	26–31	12–18	9th	C-USA Tournament
Middle Tennessee:		96–128	42–69		
Total:		263–286			
