= Bud Metheny =

American baseball player and coach (1915–2003)

- Metheny, circa 1938; William and Mary center fielder
- Outfielder
- Born: June 1, 1915; St. Louis, Missouri, U.S.
- Died: January 2, 2003 (aged 87); Virginia Beach, Virginia, U.S.
- Batted: Left Threw: Left

MLB debut
- April 27, 1943, for the New York Yankees

Last MLB appearance
- May 9, 1946, for the New York Yankees

MLB statistics
- Batting average: .247
- Home runs: 31
- Runs batted in: 156
- Stats at Baseball Reference

Teams
- New York Yankees (1943–1946)

Career highlights and awards
- World Series champion (1943)

Arthur Beauregard "Bud" Metheny (June 1, 1915 – January 2, 2003) was an American baseball player and coach. He played professional baseball for the New York Yankees (1943–46) and served Old Dominion University for 32 years as head baseball coach, head basketball coach and athletic director.

Metheny was a graduate of the College of William and Mary where he played college baseball. He was also a brother of Phi Kappa Tau.

== Career ==
During his four-year career with Yankees, he played for the Yankees in the second and last games of the 1943 World Series as the Yankees defeated the St. Louis Cardinals and he played with such great players as DiMaggio, Rizzuto and Dickey. In the minors before joining the Yankees, Metheny won pennants with Norfolk and the Kansas City Blues, as well as the Little World Series with the Newark Bears.

Metheny joined the Old Dominion athletic staff in 1948 as head baseball coach, compiling a 423–363–6 record before retiring in 1980. He was honored by the NCAA as the Eastern Regional Coach of the Year in 1963 and 1964, a period when his Monarchs captured college division crowns. He was named National Coach of the Year in 1964, and in 1980, his final season as the Monarchs head coach, ODU captured the Virginia State Championship.

Metheny served as head basketball coach from 1948 to 1965, compiling a 198–163 record and posting 16 winning seasons. His 198 wins were ultimately surpassed by Blaine Taylor on January 5, 2011. He also served as athletic director from 1963 to 1970.

== Legacy ==
In 1984, to honor Metheny and his days with the Yankees, ODU adopted the Yankee uniform look of the distinctive blue pinstripes.

Metheny was enshrined in the College Baseball Coaches Hall of Fame in Dallas in 1983. He was a member of the College Baseball Coaches Hall of Fame, Old Dominion Hall of Fame, Virginia Sports Hall of Fame, William & Mary Hall of Fame and the Tidewater Baseball Hall of Fame.

The Old Dominion baseball stadium, which opened in 1983, is named in Metheny's honor.
