= Middle Tennessee Blue Raiders baseball =

Varsity intercollegiate athletic team

Middle Tennessee Blue Raiders
- 2026 Middle Tennessee Blue Raiders baseball team
- Founded: 1912
- University: Middle Tennessee State University
- Head coach: Jerry Meyers (4th season)
- Conference: C-USA
- Location: Murfreesboro, Tennessee
- Home stadium: Reese Smith Jr. Field (capacity: 2,600)
- Nickname: Blue Raiders
- Colors: Royal blue and white

NCAA tournament appearances
- Division II; 1968 Division I: 1976, 1981, 1982, 1987, 1988, 1990, 1991, 1995, 2000, 2001, 2003, 2004, 2009

Conference tournament champions
- Ohio Valley: 1981, 1982, 1987, 1990, 1991, 1992, 1994, 1995, 2000; Sun Belt: 2003, 2009

The Middle Tennessee Blue Raiders baseball team is a varsity intercollegiate athletic team of Middle Tennessee State University in Murfreesboro, Tennessee, United States. The team is a member of Conference USA, which is part of the National Collegiate Athletic Association's Division I. Middle Tennessee's first baseball team was fielded in 1912. The team plays its home games at Reese Smith Jr. Field in Murfreesboro, Tennessee. The Blue Raiders are coached by Jerry Meyers.

Since the Major League Baseball draft began in 1965, Middle Tennessee has had 75 players selected.

== In the NCAA Tournament ==
=== NCAA Division I ===
Middle Tennessee has made the NCAA Division I baseball tournament thirteen times. They have a record of 8–26.

Year	Record	Pct	Notes
1976	0–2	.000	South Regional
1981	1–2	.333	South Regional
1982	2–2	.500	Midwest Regional
1987	0–2	.000	South I Regional
1988	1–2	.333	South Regional
1990	0–2	.000	West I Regional
1991	0–2	.000	West I Regional
1995	1–2	.333	West Regional
2000	2–2	.500	Clemson Regional
2001	0–2	.000	Knoxville Regional
2003	0–2	.000	Starkville Regional
2004	0–2	.000	Athens Regional
2009	1–2	.333	Louisville Regional
Totals	8–26	.235	

=== NCAA Division II ===
During their time in NCAA Division II, Middle Tennessee made it to the Division II tournament once. They went 3-2.

Year	Record	Pct	Notes
1968	3–2	.600	Mideast Regional

== See also ==
- List of NCAA Division I baseball programs
